= List of Venevisión telenovelas =

Venevisión is a Venezuelan television network which is a parent company of Grupo Cisneros founded in 1953 by Gustavo Cisneros.

La cruz del diablo was the first telenovela produced by the network.

== 1960s ==
=== 1960 ===
- La cruz del diablo
- El velo pintado

=== 1965 ===
- Madres solteras
- Yo, el Gobernador

=== 1966 ===
- Dulce María

=== 1967 ===
- La señorita Elena
- La muñeca brava
- Lucecita
- Doña Bárbara
- La rival

=== 1968 ===
- El reportero
- La gata
- La virgen de Barlovento
- Rosario

=== 1969 ===
- Abandonada
- Pablo y Alicia
- Soledad

== 1970s ==
Year	Title	Author	Ref.
1970	Esmeralda	Delia Fiallo	
1970	Lisa, mi amor	Delia Fiallo	
1970	María Mercé, La Chinita	Inés Rodena	
1971	Cruz de papel		
1972	María Teresa	Delia Fiallo	
1972	Me llamo Julián te quiero	Alberto Migré	
1972	Lucecita	Delia Fiallo	
1973	La loba	Manuel Muñoz Rico	
1973	La mujer prohibida	Manuel Muñoz Rico	
1973	Peregrina	Delia Fiallo	
1974	Isla de brujas	Alejandro Hurtado Terán	
1974	Los poseídos	Arthur Miller	
1974	La otra	Enrique Jarnés	
1974	Una muchacha llamada Milagros	Delia Fiallo	
1975	La señorita Elena	Delia Fiallo	
1975	Mamá	Caridad Bravo Adams	
1975	Mi hermana gemela	Delia Fiallo	
1976	Balumba	Juan Filloy	
1976	Cumbres Borrascosas	Emily Brontë	
1976	Mariana de la noche	Delia Fiallo	
1976	Daniela	Enrique Jarnés	
1977	Expediente de un amor		
1977	Laura y Virginia	Delia Fiallo; Enrique Jarnes	
1977	Rafaela	Delia Fiallo	
1977	La zulianita	Delia Fiallo	
1978	Ana María		
1978	Indocumentada	Josè Gabriel Nuñez; Ligia Lezama	
1978	María del Mar	Delia Fiallo	
1979	Rosángela	José Gabriel Nuñez	
1979	Emilia	Delia Fiallo	

== 1980s ==
Year	Title	Author	Ref.
1980	Buenos días, Isabel	Delia Fiallo	
1980	El despertar	Julio César Marmol	
1980	Mi mejor amiga	Delia Fiallo	
1981	Andreína	Julio César Marmol	
1981	María Fernanda	Humberto "Kiko" Olivieri	
1981	Querida Alicia	Humberto "Kiko" Olivieri	
1981	Ligia Sandoval	Delia Fiallo	
1981	Dos Mujeres		
1982	Sorángel	Julio César Mármol	
1982	El retorno de Ana Rosa	Julio César Marmol	
1982	La bruja	Humberto "Kiko" Olivieri	
1982	La heredera	Delia Fiallo	
1982	Ligia Elena	César Miguel Rondón	
1982	Lo que no se perdona	Olga Ruilópez	
1982	Querida mamá	Delia Fiallo	
1983	Frente a la vida		
1983	Nacho	César Miguel Rondón	
1983	Virginia	Delia Fiallo	
1983	Eternamente Tuya		
1983	La Otra Mujer o mi Rival	Humberto "Kiko" Olivieri	
1983	Tres Destinos	Humberto "Kiko" Olivieri	
1983	Siempre hay un mañana	Milagros del Valle	
1983	Julia	Humberto "Kiko" Olivieri	
1984	El retrato de un canalla	Jose Gabriel Nuñez	
1984	Virgen de Media Noche		
1984	Diana Carolina	Enrique Jarnes	
1985	Las amazonas	César Miguel Rondón	
1985	Cantaré para ti	Mariela Romero	
1985	Rosa Maria, el ángel del barrio	Enrique Jarnés	
1986	El sol sale para todos	César Miguel Rondón	
1986	Esa muchacha de ojos café	Fausto Verdial	
1986	Los Donatti	José Simón Escalona	
1986	Enamorada	Maryan Escalona	
1986	Maria José, oficios del hogar		
1987	Inmensamente tuya		
1987	Mi nombre es amor	Marta Romero	
1987	Y la luna también	César Miguel Rondón	
1987	Sueño contigo	Pilar Romero	
1988	Amor de Abril	Édgar Mejías	
1988	Alba Marina	Mariela Romero	
1988	Niña bonita	César Miguel Rondón	
1989	Fabiola	Delia Fiallo	
1989	La Revancha	Mariela Romero	
1989	La sombra de Piera	Ligia Lezama	
1989	Maribel	Delia Fiallo	
1989	Paraíso	Vivel Nouel	

== 1990s ==
Year	Title	Author	Ref.
1990	Adorable Monica	Ana Mercedes Escamez	
1990	Pasionaria	Vivel Nouel	
1990	Inés Duarte, secretaria	Alicia Barrios	
1991	Bellísima	Daniel Álvarez	
1991	La mujer prohibida	Manuel Muñoz Rico	
1991	Mundo de fieras	Ligia Lezama	
1992	Cara sucia	Inés Rodena; Carlos Romero	
1992	Macarena	Ligia Lezama	
1992	Por amarte tanto	Vivel Nouel	
1992	Amor sin fronteras	José Manuel Peláez	
1993	Amor de papel		
1993	Rosangélica	Alicia Barrios	
1993	Morena Clara	Ligia Lezama	
1994	María Celeste	Valentina Párraga	
1994	Peligrosa	Vivel Nouel	
1994	Como tú, ninguna	Alberto Gómez; Carlos Romero	
1995	Dulce Enemiga	Valentina Párraga	
1995	Ka Ina	César Miguel Rondón	
1995	Pecado de amor	Mariela Romero	
1996	El perdón de los pecados	Ibsen Martínez	
1996	Quirpa de tres mujeres	César Miguel Rondón	
1996	Sol de tentación	Vivel Nouel; María Antonieta Gutiérrez	
1997	A todo corazón	Laura Visconti; César Sierra	
1997	Amor mío	Isamar Hernández; Tabare Perez	
1997	Contra viento y marea	Leonardo Padrón	
1997	Destino de Mujer	Mariela Romero	
1997	Entre tú y yo		
1997	Todo por tu amor	Alberto Gómez	
1998	Así es la vida		
1998	El País de las mujeres	Leonardo Padrón	
1998	Enséñame a querer	Alberto Barrera Tyszka	
1998	Jugando a ganar		
1998	La mujer de mi vida	Mariela Romero	
1998	Samantha	Vivel Nouel	
1999	Calypso	César Miguel Rondón	
1999	Cuando hay pasión	Inés Rodena; Benilde Ávila	
1999	Mujercitas		
1999	Toda mujer	Pilar Romero	
1999	Enamorada	Mariela Romero	

== 2000s ==
Year	Title	Author	Ref.
2000	Hechizo de amor	Alberto Gómez	
2000	La revancha	Mariela Romero	
2000	María Rosa, búscame una esposa	Alfonso Pareja	
2000	Amantes de luna llena	Leonardo Padrón	
2000	Muñeca de trapo	Inés Rodena	
2000	Vidas prestadas	Alfonso Pareja	
2001	Cazando a un millonario		
2001	Más que amor, frenesí	César Miguel Rondón; Mónica Montañés	
2001	Felina	Vivel Nouel	
2001	Guerra de mujeres	César Miguel Rondón; Mónica Montañés	
2001	Secreto de amor	Alberto Gómez	
2002	Las González	César Miguel Rondón; Mónica Montañés	
2002	Mambo y canela	Elsa Echeverría	
2002	Gata salvaje	Alberto Gómez	
2002	Todo sobre Camila	Annie Van Der Dys	
2002	Lejana como el viento	Laura Visconti	
2003	Engañada	Benilde Ávila; Vivel Nouel	
2003	La mujer de Lorenzo	Alejandra Rodríguez	
2003	Rebeca	Alberto Gómez	
2003	Cosita rica	Leonardo Padrón	
2003	Bésame tonto	César Sierra	
2004	Amor del bueno		
2004	Sabor a ti	Ligia Lezama; Benilde Avila	
2004	Ángel Rebelde	Alberto Gómez	
2005	Nunca te diré adiós		
2005	El amor las vuelve locas	Leonardo Padrón	
2005	Soñar no cuesta nada	Verónica Suárez	
2005	Se solicita príncipe azul	Indira Páez	
2005	Con toda el alma		
2006	Olvidarte jamás	Verónica Suárez	
2006	Los Querendones	Carlos Peréz	
2006	Ciudad Bendita	Leonardo Padrón	
2006	Mi vida eres tú	Verónica Suárez	
2006	Voltea pa' que te enamores	Mónica Montañés	
2006	Mi niña amada		
2007	Acorralada	Alberto Gómez	
2007	Aunque mal paguen	Alberto Barrera Tyszka	
2007	Somos tú y yo		
2007	Arroz con leche	Doris Seguí	
2007	Trópico	Pablo Vásquez	
2007	Amor Comprado	Verónica Suárez	
2008	Te llegue a querer		
2008	Valeria	Alberto Gómez	
2008	Torrente	Benilde Ávila; Neida Padilla	
2008	Condesa por amor	Pablo Vázquez	
2008	¿Vieja Yo?	Mónica Montañés	
2008	Pobre millonaria	Vivel Nouel	
2008	La vida entera	Leonardo Padrón	
2009	Amor urbano	Manuel Mendoza	
2009	Alma indomable	Alberto Gómez	
2009	¡Qué clase de amor!	Benjamin Cohen	
2009	Pecadora	Verónica Suárez	
2009	Los misterios del amor	Alberto Barrera Tyszka	
2009	Un esposo para Estela	Ángel del Cerro	
2009	Tomasa Tequiero	Doris Seguí	

== 2010s ==
Year	Title	Author	Ref.
2010	Salvador de mujeres	Marcela Citterio	
2010	Harina de otro costal	Mónica Montañés	
2010	La mujer perfecta	Leonardo Padrón	
2010	Eva Luna	Leonardo Padrón	
2010	NPS: No puede ser	Vladimir Pérez	
2011	La viuda joven	Martín Hahn	
2011	Natalia del mar	Alberto Gómez	
2011	El árbol de Gabriel	Alberto Barrera Tyszka	
2011	Sacrificio de mujer	Carlos Pérez	
2011	Corazones extremos	Carmelo Castro	
2012	Corazón apasionado	Alberto Gómez	
2012	Válgame Dios	Mónica Montañés	
2012	Mi ex me tiene ganas	Martín Hahn	
2012	El Talismán	Verónica Suárez	
2013	De todas maneras Rosa	Carlos Pérez	
2013	Rosario	Alex Hadad	
2013	Los secretos de Lucía	Jörg Hiller	
2014	Corazón esmeralda	Vivel Nouel	
2014	Cosita linda	Leonardo Padrón	
2014	Demente criminal	Ibéyise Pacheco	
2015	Amor secreto	Alicia Barrios	
2015	Voltea pa' que te enamores	Mónica Montañés	
2016	Entre tu amor y mi amor	Carlos Pérez	
2017	Para verte mejor	Mónica Montañés	
2019	Carolay	Oduver Cubillan	

== 2020s ==
Year	Title	Author	Ref.
2023	Dramáticas	Daniel Ferrer Cubillán; Daniel Alfonso Rojas	
