= List of programs broadcast by Venevisión =

This is a list of programs currently, formerly, and soon to be broadcast by Venevisión (made by Venevisión only).

== Current programming ==
=== Telenovelas ===
Afternoon
Title	Broadcast	Sourcer
Arroz con leche		
Enamorándome de Ramón		
Amar a muerte		
Cosita linda		
Teresa (2010 telenovela)		
Nights
Title	Broadcast	Source
Pasión y poder (2015 TV series)	August 12, 2014 – present	
Por amar sin ley	March 4, 2019 – Present	
Lo imperdonable	October 1, 2014 – present	
Tomasa Tequiero	May 5, 2014 – present	

=== Programming ===
Title	Years	Type	Reference (s)
Atómico	2001-2003, 2005-2006, 2014–2023	Children's program	
Portada's AL DIA	2006–present	News program	
El Chavo del 8	2014–2019	Comedy program	
El Show del Vacilón	2012–present	Comedy program	
Super Sabado Sensacional	1970–present	Variety	
El Club de Los Tigritos in Atómico	2014–present	Children's program	
Somos tú y yo in Atómico	2014–present	TV series	
Arquitecto de sueños	—N/a	Life and style program	
¡Qué Locuras!	2000–present	Comedy program	
Locos y Sueltos	2001–present	Comedy program	
Sexo al desnudo	2012–present	Life and style program	

== Shows ==
=== News programs ===
- El Informador (1973–1993, 2002–2006)
- Noticias Venevisión (1994–2001, 2006–present)
- Frente a la Prensa (1961–1967)
- Conversaciones con Alfredo Peña (1994–1999)
- Así son las Cosas (1994–2007)
- 24 Horas (1990–2004)
- El Viva (1987–1991, 1998–2002)
- Close Up (1981–1989; 2010–present)

=== Telenovela/drama ===
- En el mar la vida es más sabrosa (2015)
- Amor Secreto (2015)
- Corazón esmeralda (2014)
- Cosita linda (2014)
- De todas maneras Rosa (2013)
- El talismán (2012)
- Corazón apasionado (2012)
- Mi ex me tiene ganas (2012)
- El árbol de Gabriel (2012)
- Válgame Dios (2012)
- Natalia del mar (2011)
- La viuda joven (2011)
- Sacrificio de mujer (2011)
- Eva Luna (2010)
- La mujer perfecta (2010)
- Harina de otro costal (2010)
- Tomasa Tequiero (2009)
- Un esposo para Estela (2009)
- Los misterios del amor (2009)
- Alma indomable (2009)
- Pobre millonaria (2008)
- La vida entera (2008–2009)
- ¿Vieja yo? (2008–2009)
- Valeria (2008)
- Torrente (2008)
- Arroz con Leche (2007–2008)
- Somos Tú y Yo (2007–2010)
- Amor Comprado (2007-2008)
- Aunque mal paguen (2007–2008)
- Acorralada (2007)
- Voltea pa' que te enamores (2006–2007)
- Ciudad Bendita (2006–2007)
- Olvidarte Jamás (2006)
- Los Querendones (2006)
- Con Toda el Alma (2005–2006)
- Mi vida eres tú (2005)
- Soñar no cuesta nada (2005)
- El amor las vuelve locas (2005)
- Se solicita principe azul (2005)
- Nunca te Dire Adios (2005)
- Ángel rebelde (2004)
- Sabor a ti (2004–2005)
- Amor del bueno (2004)
- Rebeca (2003)
- Todo sobre Camila (2003)
- Engañada (2003)
- Bésame tonto (2003)
- Cosita rica (2003–2004)
- Las González (2002)
- Gata salvaje (2002–2003)
- Lejana como el viento (2002)
- Mambo y Canela (2002)
- Felina (2001)
- Cazando a un millonario (2001)
- Guerra de mujeres (2001–2002)
- Mas que amor, frenesí (2001)
- Secreto de amor (2001)
- María Rosa, búscame una esposa (2000)
- Vidas prestadas (2000)
- Hechizo de amor (2000)
- Muñeca de trapo (2000)
- Amantes de Luna Llena (2000–2001)
- Vuleve Junto a Mi (2000)
- Calypso (1999)
- Cuando Hay Pasion (1999)
- El País de las mujeres (1999–2000)
- Enamorada (1999)
- Toda Mujer (1999)
- Jugando A Ganar (1998)
- Asi es la Vida (1998)
- Enseñame un Querer (1998)
- La Mujer de mi Vida (1998)
- Samantha (1998)
- Entre Tu y Yo (1997)
- A todo corazón (1997–1998)
- Destino de Mujer (1997)
- Contra viento y marea (1997)
- Amor Mío (1997)
- Todo Por Tu Amor (1997)
- Sol de Tentación (1996)
- Quirpa de Tres Mujeres (1996)
- El Perdón De Los Pecados (1996)
- Pecado de Amor (1995)
- Dulce Enemiga (1995)
- Ka Ina (1995)
- Como tú, ninguna (1994)
- Maria Celeste (1994)
- Peligrosa (1994)
- Morena Clara (1993)
- Rosangelica (1993)
- Amor de Papel (1993)
- Por Amarte Tanto (1993)
- Amor Sin Fronteras (1992)
- Cara Sucia (1992)
- Macarena (1992)
- Bellisima (1991)
- Ines Duarte, Secretaria (1991)
- La mujer prohibida (1991)
- Mundo de Fieras (1991)
- Adorable Mónica (1990)
- La Revancha (1990)
- Pasionaria (1990)
- Fabiola (1989)
- Maribel (1989)
- Paraíso (1989)
- La Sombra de Piera (1989)
- Alba Marina (1988)
- Amor de Abril (1988)
- Niña Bonita (1988)
- Mi Nombre es Amor (1987)
- Y Tambien la Luna (1987)
- Maria Jose, Oficios del hogar (1986)
- Las Amazonas (1985)
- Cantare Para Ti (1985)
- El Sol Sale Para Todos (1985)
- Nacho (1984)
- Sueño Contigo (1984)
- Diana Carolina (1983)
- Ligia Elena (1983)
- Sorangel (1982)
- Querida Mama (1982)
- Maria Fernanda (1981)
- La Heredera (1981)
- Buenos Días, Isabel (1980)
- Mi mejor Amiga (1980)
- Emilia (1979)
- Rosángela (1979)
- Ana María (1979)
- Daniela (1978)
- María del Mar (1978)
- Rafaela (1977)
- La Zulianita (1977)
- Laura y Virginia (1977)
- Cumbres Borrascosas (1976)
- Balumba (1976)
- Mariana de la Noche (1976) (Mexican version of Mariana de la Noche on Televisa in 2003)
- La Señorita Elena (1975)
- Una Muchacha llamada Milagros (1974)
- Peregrina (1973)
- La mujer prohibida (1972)
- Maria Teresa (1972)
- Esmeralda (1970)
- Rosario (1968)
- La Muñeca Brava (1967)
- Tormenta (1967)

=== Reality ===
- Cuanto Vale el Show (1998–2001)

=== Sitcom ===
- Casos y Cosas de Casa (1961–1975)

=== Variety ===
- Valores Humanos (1967–1982)
- De Fiesta con Venevision (1969–1982)
- (Super) Sabado Sensacional (1972–present)
- Sopotocientos (1972–1974)
- Humor con Joselo (1972–1979, 1982–1993)
- Bienvenidos (1982–2006)
- Giros TV (1992–1997)
- Cheverísimo (1992–2020)
- El Club de Los Tigritos (1994–1999)
- Confidencias (1996–2004; 2011-2012)
- Maite (1997–2001)
- Viviana a la Medianoche (1999–2001)
- Rugemania (1999–2001)
- La Magica Aventura de Oscar (2000)
- ¡Qué Mujeres! (2001–2003)
- Marta Susana (2001–2007)
- Atomico (2001–2006; 2014–present)
- Salvese Quien Pueda (2002–2010)
- Cual es La Solución (2005–2009)
- Erika Tipo 11 (2012-2013)

=== Game show ===
- Match 4 (1986–1988)
- Mega Match (1996–2006)
- La Fiebre del Dinero (2001)
- Que Dice La Gente (2001–2002)
- Todo por Venezuela (2004–2006)
- El Gran Navegante (2007–2009)
- La guerra de los Sexos (2000-2020)

=== Kids' programs ===
- El Club de Los Tigritos (1994-2000)
- Juana la Iguana (1998-2003)
- Plaza Sésamo (1972–present)

== Sports Events ==
=== Soccer ===
- FIFA World Cup
- FIFA Under-20 World Cup
- FIFA Under-17 World Cup
- FIFA Women's World Cup
- FIFA U-20 Women's World Cup
- FIFA U-17 Women's World Cup
- FIFA Confederations Cup

=== Tennis ===
- ATP World Tour Masters 1000
- ATP World Tour 500
