= List of Venezuelan telenovelas =

A list of Venezuelan telenovelas.

- A Calzón Quitao (Removed Outerwear)
- A Todo Corazon (Every Heart)
- Abandonada (Neglected)
- Abigail 1988
- Acorralada (Corraled)
- Adorable Monica (Adorable Monica)
- Adriana
- Alba Marina
- Alejandra
- Alma Mia 1988
- Alondra
- Amanda Sabater
- Amantes de Luna Llena
- Amantes (2005)
- Amor Comprado (I Bought Myself A Love)
- Amor a Palos (Love to Friends)
- Amor de Abril (Love in the Month of April)
- Amor de Papel (Love Made Out of Paper) 1993
- Amor del Bueno (A Nice Love)
- Amor Mio (My Dear)
- Amor Sin Fronteras (Borderless Love)
- Amores de Barrio Adentro (Inner-City Lovers)
- Amores de Fin de Siglo (End-of-Century Lovers)
- Anabel (Anabel)
- Angel Rebelde (Out-of-Control Angel)
- Angelica Pecado (Holy Sin)
- Angelito (Small Angel)
- Ante la Ley (Above the Law)
- Asi es la Vida (Life is This Way)
- Atrévete (I Dare You To) 1986
- Aunque me Cueste la Vida
- Azucena
- Bellisima (Extremely Beautiful)
- Besame Tonto (Kiss Me, You Moron)
- Bienvenida Esperanza (A Welcomed Hope)
- Boves, El Urogallo (Boves, The Urogal)
- Buenos Dias, Isabel (Good Day, Isabel)
- Calypso (Calypso)
- Camay (named by soap Camay of sponsor Procter & Gamble)
- Cambio de Piel (Changing of the Skin)
- Campeones (Champions)
- Canaima(Canaima)
- La criada de la granja
- Cantare para Ti (Would You Sing for Me?)
- Cara Sucia (Dirty Face)
- Caribe (Caribbean Sea)
- Carissima (Charisma)
- Carita Pintada (Picture Face)
- Carmen Querida (Carmen, You Are Loved)
- Carolina (Carolina)
- Cazando a un Millonario (Wedding for a Millionaire)
- Chao Cristina (See Ya, Christina)
- Chinita, mi amor (Dear Chinita)
- Cimarrón (Cimarron)
- Claudia (Claudia)
- Clemencia
- Como Tu, Ninguna (Nobody Else Like You)
- Con Toda el Alma
- Contra Viento y Marea (Against All Odds (Venezuela))
- Cosita Rica
- Cristal 1985
- Cristina
- Cuando el Cielo es Más Azul
- Cuando Hay Pasion
- Cumbres Borrascosas
- Daniela
- De Mujeres
- De Oro Puro
- De todas maneras Rosa
- Destino de Mujer
- Detrás del Telón
- Doña Bárbara (1967-8)
- Doña Bárbara (1975)
- Dulce Amargo
- Dulce Enemiga 1995
- Dulce Ilusión
- El Alma no tiene Color (A Colorless Soul)
- El Amor las Vuelve Locas (Crazy In Love)
- El Castillo de Hierro
- El Derecho de Nacer
- El Desafío
- El Desprecio
- El Engaño
- El Esposo de Anaís
- El gato tuerto
- El hombre de la máscara de hierro
- El Pais de las Mujeres
- El País Perdido
- El Perdon de los Pecados
- El Precio de Una Vida
- El Primer Milagro
- El Sol Sale Para Todos
- Elizabeth
- Emperatriz
- Enamorada
- Engañada
- Enseñame a Querer
- Entre Tu y Yo 1997
- Entrega Total
- Esmeralda
- Estefania
- Estrambotica Anastasia
- Eva Marina
- Fabiola
- Felina
- Federicco
- Gardenia
- Gata Salvaje ("Wild Cat")
- Guayoyo Express
- Guerra de Mujeres
- Guerreras y Centauros
- Hay Amores Que Matan (Killer Lovers)
- Hechizo de Amor
- Historia de Tres Hermanas
- Hoy te Vi
- Ilusiones 1995
- Ines Duarte, Secretaria 1991
- Ifigenia
- Juana la Virgen
- Jugando a Ganar
- Ka Ina 1995
- Kapricho S.A.
- Kassandra
- Kiko Botones
- La Balandra Isabel llegó esta tarde (The sloop "Isabel" came this afternoon)
- La Comadre
- La Cruz de Palo
- La Cuaima (The Cuaima)
- La Dama de Rosa 1986
- La Doña Perfecta (The Perfect Housewife)
- La Dueña
- La fiera
- La Goajirita
- La Hija de Juana Crespo
- La historia de un Canalla (A Coward's Story)
- La Indomable (The Undefeated)
- La Inolvidable
- La Intrusa 1986
- La Invasora
- La Italianita
- La Mujer de Judas ("Wife of Judas") 2002
- La Mujer de mi Vida
- La mujer perfecta
- La mujer prohibida ("Forbidden Woman") 1972
- La mujer prohibida ("Forbidden Woman") 1991
- La Niña de mis ojos (My Beloved Girlfriend)
- La Novela de Pasion (Passion Is A Soap Opera)
- La Novela del Hogar (The Homemade Soap Opera)
- La Novela LM (LM, The Soap Opera)
- La Novela Romantica (A Romantic Soap Opera)
- La Pasion de Teresa 1989
- La Potra Zaina
- La Posada Maldita
- La Revancha 1989, 2000
- La Salvaje
- La Señora de Cárdenas (Mr. Cárdenas' Woman)
- La Señorita Elena
- La Señorita Perdomo
- La Soberana
- La Sombra de Piera
- La Tirana
- La Trepadora
- La Única
- La usurpadora
- Las Amazonas 1985
- Las Bandidas
- Las Gonzalez
- Las Nuevas aventuras de Fredericco
- Lejana Como el Viento (As Far As The Wind)
- Leonela 1983
- Ligia Elena
- Los Amores de Anita Peña
- Los Ojos que Vigilan (Spying Eyes)
- Los Querendones (The Lucky Ones)
- Luisa Fernanda
- Luisana Mia
- Luz Marina
- Luz y Sombras
- Mabel Valdez
- Macarena
- Mama Trompeta
- Mambo y Canela
- Maria Celeste 1994
- Maria de los Angeles
- Maria del Mar 1978
- Maria Jose, oficios del hogar
- Maria, Maria 1990
- Maria Rosa, Buscame una Esposa
- Mariana Montiel
- Maribel
- Marielena
- Marisela
- Mariú 1999
- Marta y Javier 1983
- Mas que Amor... Frenesi
- Mi amada Beatriz 1987
- Mi ex me tiene ganas
- Mi Gorda Bella
- Mi Hermano Satanas (My Satanic Brothers)
- Mi Hijo Gabriel (My Son Gabriel)
- Mi Nombre es Amor 1987
- Mi Prima Ciela
- Mi Secreto me Condena
- Mi Vida Eres Tu
- Mis Tres Hermanas
- Morena Clara
- Mujer con Pantalones
- Mujer de Mundo
- Mujer Secreta
- Mundo de Fieras 1990
- Muñeca de Trapo
- Muñequita
- Nacho
- Natalia de 8 a 9
- Negra Consentida
- Niña Bonita 1988
- Niña Mimada (The Girl Who Copies People)
- Niño de Papel (The Paperboy)
- Nunca te diré adiós
- O.K.
- Olvidarte Jamas
- Palmolive
- Paraiso 1989
- Pasionaria 1990
- Pecado de Amor 1996
- Peligrosa
- Peregrina
- Piel de Sapa
- Pobre Negro (Poor Negro)
- Por Amarte Tanto
- Por Estas Calles
- Primavera
- Pura Sangre
- ¡Qué buena se puso Lola! (How Good Lola Has It!))
- ¡Qué Clase de Amor!
- Que Paso con Jacqueline? 1982
- Quirpa de Tres Mujeres 1996
- Rafaela
- Raquel
- Rebeca
- Reina de Corazones
- Renzo el Gitano
- Roberta 1987
- Rosa de la Calle 1982
- Rosangela
- Rosangelica
- Rosario
- Rubi Rebelde 1989
- Sabor a Ti (The Taste of Your Lips)
- Sabrina
- Sacrificio de Mujer (A Woman's Sacrifice)
- Samantha 1998
- Se Solicita Principe Azul (Prince Charming is Hanging Around)
- Secreto de Amor
- Selva, la Virgen de Barro
- Selva María 1987
- Señora 1988
- Ser bonita no basta
- Silvia Rivas, divorciada
- Sobre la Misma Tierra
- Sol de Tentacion
- Soltera y sin Compromiso
- Soñar no Cuesta Nada (Costless Dreaming)
- Sonia
- Sor Alegría
- Su Mala Hora
- Tinieblas en el Corazón
- Toda Mujer
- Todo sobre Camila
- Topacio 1985
- Tormenta de Pasión
- Tormento
- Torrente
- Trapos Íntimos
- Tuya Para Siempre
- TV Confidencial
- Un Pedazo de Cielo
- Una Muchacha llamada Milagros
- Valentina
- Valeria
- Vidas Prestadas
- Viva la Pepa (Pepa Rules!)
- Volver a Vivir
- Voltea Pa'Que te Enamores (Tip 'Cuz You're in Love With Me)
- Vuelve Junto a Mi (Return To Me)
- Y la Luna Tambien
- Yo Compro a esa mujer

== 2010s ==
| Year | Title | Author | Network | Ref. |
|---|---|---|---|---|
| 2010 | Que el cielo me explique | Cristina Policastro | Radio Caracas Televisión | |
| 2010 | Harina de otro costal | Mónica Montañés | Venevisión | |
| 2010 | La mujer perfecta | Leonardo Padrón | Venevisión | |
| 2011 | La viuda joven | Martín Hahn | Venevisión | |
| 2011 | Natalia del mar | Alberto Gómez | Venevisión | |
| 2011 | El árbol de Gabriel | Alberto Barrera Tyszka | Venevisión | |
| 2012 | Válgame Dios | Mónica Montañes | Venevisión | |
| 2012 | Mi ex me tiene ganas | Martin Hahn | Venevisión | |
| 2012 | Nacer contigo | José Simón Escalona | Televen | |
| 2013 | De todas maneras Rosa | Carlos Pérez | Venevisión | |
| 2014 | Corazón esmeralda | Vivel Nouel | Venevisión | |
| 2015 | Amor secreto | César Sierra | Venevisión | |
| 2015 | Guerreras y Centauros | Carmelo Castro | TVes | |
| 2015 | Piel salvaje | Martín Hahn | Televen | |
| 2015 | A puro corazón | César Sierra | Televen | |
| 2015 | Vivir para amar | César Sierra | TVes | |
| 2016 | Entre tu amor y mi amor | Carlos Perez | Venevisión | |

== Co-productions ==
| Year | Title | Author | Production | Ref. |
|---|---|---|---|---|
| 2010 | Salvador de mujeres | Marcela Citterio | Venevision International | |
| 2011 | Eva Luna | Leonardo Padrón | Venevisión and Univision | |
| 2011 | Sacrificio de mujer | Carlos Pérez Santos | Venevisión and Univision | |
| 2012 | Corazón apasionado | Alberto Gómez | Venevisión and Univision | |
| 2012 | El Talismán | Verónica Suárez | Venevisión and Univision | |
| 2012 | Dulce amargo | Iris Dubs | Televen, Cadena Tres and Telemundo International | |
| 2013 | Rosario | Alberto Gómez | Venevisión and Univision | |
| 2013 | Los secretos de Lucía | Jörg Hiller | Venevisión and BE-TV | |
| 2013 | Las Bandidas | TBA | RCN Televisión, RCTV International and Televisa | |
