= Julia (1983 TV series) =

- Genre: Telenovela; Drama
- Created by: Humberto "Kiko" Olivieri
- Directed by: Grazio D'Angelo
- Starring: Hilda Carrero; Eduardo Serrano; Miriam Ochoa; Tony Rodriguez
- Opening theme: Mañana te parte en dos by José Alberto Mugrabi
- Country of origin: Venezuela
- Original language: Spanish

Production
- Executive producer: Tabare Perez
- Production company: Venevisión

Original release
- Network: Venevisión
- Release: June 26 – November 3, 1984

Related
- Virginia; Diana Carolina; El fantasma de Elena (2010)

Julia is a Venezuelan telenovela written by Humberto "Kiko" Olivieri and produced by Venevisión in 1983. Hilda Carrero and Eduardo Serrano as the main protagonists with Miriam Ochoa, Eva Blanco and Tony Rodríguez as the antagonists.

In 2010, Telemundo produced a remake titled El fantasma de Elena.

== Plot ==
Eduardo suffers an accident on his yacht and is found on a beach by Julia, a beautiful and humble girl who lives near the beach off the Venezuelan coast. Julia takes the stranger to her house where she lives with her father and a profound love develops between them. At first glance, her father notices the differences between the two. Eduardo convinces Julia they get married and move to the city since they have already had sex. Eduardo is a wealthy widower and takes Julia to his mansion in Caracas. His family treats her harshly, especially Eduardo's sister Rebecca who sees her as an opportunist.

In the mansion, Julia is captivated by a large painting of a beautiful woman which hangs in a most privileged place in the house. She later learns the picture is that of Eduardo's first wife also called Julia who committed suicide a year ago by throwing herself from the top floor window of the mansion. From that moment on, everyone begins to compare her with the deceased, especially Benjamín, Eduardo's young nephew. Julia begins to notice strange things and secrets in the Uzcátegui family such as strange noises from the walls, people disappearing, unexplained murders and illicit relations. Everyone believes this is caused by Julia's ghost, as several family members and the servants claim to have seen her ghost. Also, a rumor begins that Eduardo murdered his wife.

Julia discovers she has a rich elderly grandmother who lives next door to the mansion as her father hid the truth from her. She also discovers the existence of a twin sister of the deceased, Daniela, who went crazy after her sister's suicide and was admitted into a mental asylum in London, but was later taken to the mansion and hidden in one of the rooms. Julia's grandmother dies and leaves her all her fortune and as she is now a millionaire, Eduardo's financial situation is in ruin. She begins to doubt him not only for his supposed involvement in death of his first wife, but also believes their meeting at the beach was planned knowing she was an heiress. Disappearances continue in the mansion, and everyone later discovers Julia is actually alive and it was her twin sister who died in her wedding dress.

== Cast ==
- Hilda Carrero as Julia
- Eduardo Serrano as Eduardo
- Miriam Ochoa as Julia/ Daniela
- Tony Rodríguez as Benjamín
- Eva Blanco as Latoña
- Fernando Flores
- Julio Jung
- Elena Farías
- Reneé de Pallás
- Manuel Escolano
- Mariela Alcalá
- Esther Orjuela
- Enrique Alzugaray
- Francisco Ferrari
- Esperanza Magaz

== See also ==
- List of telenovelas of Venevisión
