= Esa muchacha de ojos café =

Venezuelan telenovela

- Genre: Telenovela; Drama
- Created by: Fausto Verdial
- Written by: Fausto Verdial; Mariela Romero; Carmelo Castro
- Directed by: Renato Gutiérrez; José A. Farrara
- Starring: Alba Roversi; Carlos Olivier; Elluz Peraza; Aroldo Betancourt; Daniel Alvarado
- Opening theme: Vamos a dejarlo by Ricardo Montaner
- Country of origin: Venezuela
- Original language: Spanish

Production
- Executive producers: Arnaldo Limansky; Valentina Parraga
- Running time: 41-44 minutes
- Production company: Venevisión

Original release
- Network: Venevisión
- Release: 1986 – 1987

Related
- El sol sale para todos; Y la luna también

Esa muchacha de ojos café (English title: That Girl With Coffee-Colored Eyes) is a Venezuelan telenovela written by Fausto Verdial and produced and aired on Venevisión between 1986 and 1987.

Alba Roversi and Carlos Olivier star as the main protagonists with Elluz Peraza and Aroldo Betancourt as antagonists.

== Plot ==
Amelia San José owns a bar called El campeón but finds herself in prison after a false complaint. Her two children Chuíto and Carita take refuge in the house of Angélica Subero who is popularly referred to as Doña Brava. Although Angélica lives in a barrio, she is a member of the wealthy Subero family which is made up of Daniel, his wife Graciela and their two adopted children María Gracia and Miguel. Graciela lives with jealousy obsessed that there is another woman in her husband's life. Although Daniel denies it, he has been having an affair with Belén Leirado, his advisor at his company who is also Graciela's close friend. Meanwhile, there is another branch of the Subero family that has been forgotten. Juan Pedro Subero had grown up in exile after his parents were disinherited. Juan Pedro decides to come to the city to claim his rights over the family fortune, and arrives at the house of his aunt Angélica. There he will fall in love with Carita, but a fierce rivalry will form with his cousin Miguel over Carita's affections, while María Gracia also becomes obsessed with him.

== Cast ==
- Alba Roversi as Caridad San José "Carita"
- Carlos Olivier as Juan Pedro Subero
- Elluz Peraza as María Gracia Subero
- Aroldo Betancourt as Miguel Subero
- Daniel Alvarado as Daniel Subero
- Miriam Ochoa as Belén Leirado
- Irene Arcila as Angélica Subero "Doña Brava"
- María Cristina Lozada as Graciela de Subero "Grachi"
- Agustina Martin as Amelia San José
- Yolanda Méndez as Sol Patria Oteiza
- Freddy Galavis as Perecito
- Javier Díaz as Luis García Bravo
- Angélica Arenas as Patricia
- Laura Zerra as Maigualita Ferranz "Maigualida"
- Henry Lavat as Fermín
- Alejo Felipe as Gabriel Subero
- Patricia Noguera as Alexa
- Ernesto Balzi
- Carlos Carrero as Chuíto
- Carlos Subero as Francisco Oteiza
- Judith Vásquez as Fátima Arguedes
- Soraya Sanz as Florita
- Yadira Santana as Elba Machado
- Francisco Ferrari as Pelayo
- Jessica Dell' Ovo as Danielita Subero
