= Más que amor, frenesí =

Más que amor, frenesí may refer to:

- Not Love, Just Frenzy (Spanish: Más que amor, frenesí), 1996 adventure and drama film
- Más que amor, frenesí (TV series), a 2001 Venezuelan telenovela
