= La mujer prohibida =

La mujer prohibida may refer to:

- La mujer prohibida (1972 TV series), a Venezuelan telenovela
- La mujer prohibida (1991 TV series), a Venezuelan telenovela
