= La heredera =

La heredera may refer to:

- La heredera (Mexican TV series), 2004
- La heredera (Venezuelan TV series), 1982
