= Brandon Peniche =

Mexican actor (born 1987)

- Born: Brandon Arturo Delgadillo Ortiz; August 3, 1987 (age 39); México City, México
- Occupation: Actor
- Years active: 2009-present
- Spouse: Kristal Cid (m. 2016)
- Children: 2
- Parent(s): Arturo Peniche; Gaby Ortiz
- Relatives: Khiabet (sister); Flavio Peniche (uncle)

Brandon Peniche (born Brandon Arturo Delgadillo Ortiz on August 3, 1987) is a Mexican actor. He is the son of one of the most famous telenovela actors of all time, legend of Mexican television Arturo Peniche and Gaby Ortiz. Brandon also has one sister Khiabet. He is married with Kristal Cid, daughter of Mexican actress Sharis Cid. He has one daughter Alessia born 2018, and a son Bosco born in 2020.

== Filmography ==
Year	Title	Role	Notes
2009	Verano de amor	Dylan Carrasco Moret	Recurring Role
2010-11	Niña de mi Corazón	Conrado Gayardo "Masiosare/Cónsul"	Main role
2011-12	Ni Contigo Ni Sin Ti	Diego Torreslanda	Main role
2012-13	Un Refugio para el Amor	Patricio Torreslanda Fuentes-Gil	Recurring role
2013	Corazón indomable	Alfonso del Olmo	Recurring role
2014	La malquerida	Manuel Palacios Salmeron	Main role
2015	Nuestra Belleza Latina 2015	Himself	Celebrity guest; episode 3
2015	Que te perdone Dios	Pablo Ramos	Guest star
2015-16	A que no me dejas	Rene Murat Greppe	Recurring role
2016	Un camino hacia el destino	Javier Arias	Recurring role
2018	Tres Milagros	Aquiles	Guest star
2019	La reina soy yo	Alberto Cantú	Recurring role
2021-22	Contigo sí	Leonardo Santillana	Main role
2023	Pienso en ti	Manolo Pérez Torreblanca	Guest star
2023-24	Nadie como tú	Salvador	Main role
2024	La historia de Juana	Gabriel Vega	Main role
2024-25	Las hijas de la señora García	Arturo Portilla	Main role
2025	Doménica Montero	Genaro Peña López	Main role
2026	Tierra de amor y coraje	Jerónimo	Main role
2027	Todavía te amo	Santiago Quintana	Main role

== Awards and nominations ==
2016 - TVyNovelas Award for Best Young Lead Actor
