= Luis José Santander =

Venezuelan actor (born 1960)

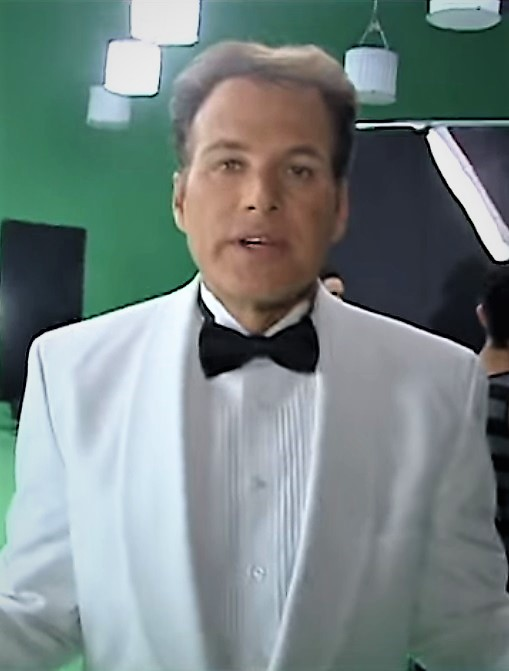
- Luis Jose Santander interviewed on Mi Sueño Es Bailar in 2013
- Born: April 8, 1960 (age 65); Fort Collins, Colorado, United States
- Occupation: Actor
- Height: 6.02 ft (183 cm)

Luis José Santander (born April 8, 1960) is a Venezuelan actor. He was born in the United States and raised in Venezuela.

== Biography ==
Santander was born in Fort Collins, Colorado, USA, where his parents were studying. Santander arrived in Venezuela at an early age, and grew up in an environment where artistic manifestations were present every day as painters, poets, and illustrious musicians who visited the house of his parents.

After completing his primary and secondary studies, he put aside his parents dream that he study medicine, instead choosing to study acting. He achieved a scholarship to study drama in the United States in Bridgeport Connecticut, where he perfected the mastery of the language of Shakespeare.

Santander has received several awards among which are: Mara Gold, Meridian Gold, TVyNovelas, Silver Star——the latter two of Mexico, among others. His popularity has steadily increased and with it he has received multiple invitations to participate in events and programs in America, Europe, and even Asia.

== Career ==
Santander was not an instant sensation, as he had to work hard to become famous. He labored as an actor in small plays around Venezuela when his chance to become famous arrived in 1987. That year, he made his television debut in Y la Luna Tambien ("And the Moon Too"), which became a major international hit, reaching important numbers in Puerto Rico, Mexico and Ecuador, among others. It wasn't until 1988, however, when, at the age of 28, he became a teen idol following the smash success of Niña Bonita ("Pretty Girl"). This production, which was produced by Venevision and had nothing in common storywise with the latter Hollywood hit "Pretty Woman", was a major hit all over Latin America propelling Santander and his female co-star, Ruddy Rodríguez, into super-stardom in the area. The telenovela's title song Tan Enamorados also propelled singer Ricardo Montaner into international fame.

Niña Bonita's success raised both Santander and Rodriguez's rentability in the high-paying Hispanic soap opera world. In Santander's case, he followed Niña Bonita with Maribel in 1989. While not as successful as Niña Bonita, Maribel was also a large hit for the Venezuelan actor.

In 1991, he participated in Mundo de Fieras, which was another large success on the Venezuelan and United States Latino television viewer's ratings.

By then, his telenovelas had caused so much interest, that Santander became well known in Europe as well, with many of his soap operas being shown in places like Russia and Hungary.

In 1993, Santander participated in Macarena. In 1994, he participated in Morena Clara ("Brown Girl"), which, again, would prove that he was among Venezuelans' favorite actors.

In a surprise move, he went to Mexico in 1995, contracted by that country's largest network, Televisa, to film Lazos de Amor, ("Love Ties") alongside Mexican superstar Lucero. Odd as it might sound to many, at the age of 37, Santander recovered his status as a teen idol, at least in Mexico, where that soap opera became a classic of Mexican television, due in part to the following he generated among Mexican teenaged girl. Afterward, he starred in Te sigo amando ("I will still love you") (1996) with Claudia Ramirez and Sergio Goyri.

After filming Vidas Prestadas ("Borrowed Lives") in 2000, Santander has lived in semi-retirement, often flying between Mexico and Venezuela for interviews and special occasions, including appearing in "Inocente de ti" alongside Camila Sodi and Valentino Lanus.

In 2006, Santander returned to Venezuela to star in the telenovela "Silvia Rivas, divorciada". In 2007, Santander appeared in the telenovela Voltea pa' que te enamores.

In 2007, he was also invited to participate in the telenovela Pasión which was produced by Carla Estrada in Mexico and was shown in several countries around the world. Santander played "Foreman", a British pirate. Carla Estrada also produced Lazos de Amor (Love Ties) which was mentioned before.

== Filmography ==
=== Television ===
Year	Title	Role	Notes
1987–1988	Y la luna también	Simón Azcárate	
1988	Niña bonita	Francisco Antonio León	
1989	Maribel	Luis Alejandro Del Valle	
1991–1992	Mundo de fieras	Iván Soriano	
1992–1993	Macarena	José Miguel	
1994	Morena Clara	Valentín Andara	
1995–1996	Lazos de amor	Nicolás Miranda	
1996–1997	Te sigo amando	Luis Ángel Zaldívar	
2000	Vidas prestadas	José María "Chema" Rivero	Associate producer
2004–2005	Inocente de ti	Sergio Dalmacci	
2007–2008	Pasión	John Foreman "El Inglés"	
2008	Juro que te amo	Amado Madrigal	
2009–2010	Alma Indomable	Esteban de la Vega	
2011–2012	Sacrificio de mujer	Dr. Augusto Talamonti	
2012	Corazón apasionado	Ricardo Rey	
2013	Noches con Platanito	Himself	"Las Lavanderas/Luis Jose Santander/Julión Álvarez" (Season 1, Episode 3)
