= Emma Rabbe =

Canadian and Venezuelan actress (born 1969)

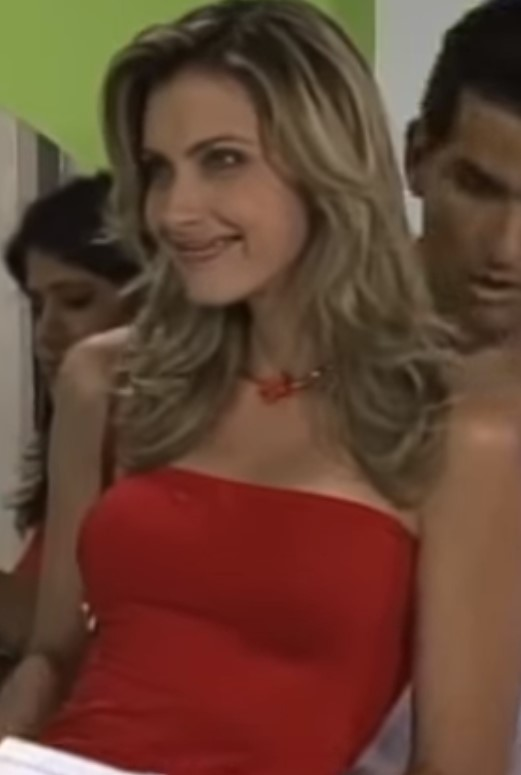
- Born: Emma Irmgard Marina Rabbe Ramírez; 18 April 1969 (age 57); Ottawa, Ontario, Canada
- Citizenship: Canada; Venezuela
- Occupation: Actress
- Known for: Miss Venezuela 1988 (Miss World Venezuela); Miss World 1988 (Top 5) (Miss World Americas)
- Height: 1.75 m (5 ft 9 in)
- Spouse: Daniel Alvarado (1998–2015)
- Children: 3

Emma Irmgard Marina Rabbe Ramírez (born 18 April 1969) is a Canadian-Venezuelan actress and beauty pageant titleholder.

== Miss World ==
Rabbe competed in Miss Venezuela 1988, as the representative of Distrito Federal, obtaining the title of "Miss World Venezuela". She represented her country in the Miss World 1988 pageant, where she was 3rd runner-up.

== Life after Miss World ==
Rabbe had been married to Venezuelan actor Daniel Alvarado since 1998 until 2015. The couple has three sons, Daniel Alejandro (born 1999), Diego Jose (born 2001) and Calvin Daniel (born 3 May 2007).

== Filmography ==
=== Films ===
Year	Title	Role	Notes
1992	La dulce tía: Vuelve la tía		Debut film
2007	13 segundos	Isaura	

=== Television ===
Year	Title	Role	Notes
1989	Maribel	Debut	Debut
1990	Adorable Mónica	Mónica Suárez	Lead role
1991–1992	Bellísima	Gabriela Gruber	Lead role
1994–1995	Peligrosa	Clementina	Lead role
1995	Pecado de amor	Indira	
1998	Reina de corazones	Marlene Páez / Sara	Lead role
2000	Hechizo de amor	Ligia Valderrama	Lead role
2004	¡Qué buena se puso Lola!	Aegella León	
2005	Amor a palos	Virginia Revueltas	Co-lead role
2002	Mi gorda bella	Tza Tza Lanz (Sása)	Co-lead role
2008	La trepadora	Fernanda Del Casal de Alcoy	
2009	Tomasa Tequiero	Emilia	
2011	La viuda joven	Penélope Arrechero	
2012	Nacer contigo	Alina Cordero	

Awards and achievements
Preceded by (Venezuela) Albany Lozada	Miss World Americas; 1988	Succeeded by (Canada) Leanne Caputo
Preceded by Albany Lozada	Miss World Venezuela; 1988	Succeeded by Fabiola Candosin
