= Todavía te amo =

- Genre: Telenovela
- Based on: Emilia by Delia Fiallo
- Developed by: Ximena Suárez
- Directed by: Carlos Cock Marín; Juan Pablo Blanco; Carlos Santos
- Starring: Scarlet Gruber; Brandon Peniche
- Country of origin: Mexico
- Original language: Spanish

Production
- Executive producer: Carlos Bardasano
- Producer: Carmen Cecilia Urbaneja
- Camera setup: Multi-camera
- Production company: TelevisaUnivision

Original release
- Network: Las Estrellas

Todavía te amo is an upcoming Mexican telenovela produced by Carlos Bardasano for TelevisaUnivision. It is based on the 1979 Venezuela telenovela Emilia created by Delia Fiallo. The series stars Scarlet Gruber and Brandon Peniche.

== Plot ==
María Emilia Palacios is a young woman who was born into a wealthy family. However, the loss of her mother and the sudden death of her father, Bruno, leave the family bankrupt. Faced with reality, María Emilia, her grandmother Octavia, and her siblings Natasha and Alfonso are forced to move to a modest neighborhood. To provide for her family, María Emilia begins working as an English teacher, and in her new workplace, she meets Santiago Quintana, a successful advertising executive and brother of Camila, María Emilia's student. The attraction between María Emilia and Santiago is immediate, but their love will face severe trials involving class differences, intrigues, lies, and secrets. They'll have to deal with Santiago's romantic past and with Natasha's immense ambition, as she'll stop at nothing to regain the life of luxury she lost, unleashing a web of deceit that will put the Quintana family in jeopardy.

== Cast ==
- Scarlet Gruber as María Emilia Palacios
- Brandon Peniche as Santiago Quintana
- Susana González as Hilda
- Gabriel Soto as Francisco
- Samadhi Zendejas as Natasha Palacios
- Graco Sendel as Alfonso Palacios
- Felicia Mercado as Octavia
- Eugenio Siller as Raúl Bracamontes
- Susana Elías González as Camila Quintana
- Azela Robinson
- Erick Chapa
- Alex Perea
- María Chacón
- Julia Urbini
- Ale Müller
- Gonzalo Peña
- Omar Germenos
- Paola Toyos
- María Fernanda García
- Ana de Villa
- María de Villa
- Carlos Gatica
- Christian Ramos
- Jorge Alberti
- Manuel Castillo
- Aldo de la Rosa
- Steffy Torres
- Vanessa López
- Almudena López
- Lía Franco

== Production ==
On 14 July 2026, it was announced that Carlos Bardasano would produce a remake of the 1979 telenovela Emilia. The following day, Susana González and Gabriel Soto joined the cast. On 6 August 2026, Scarlet Gruber and Brandon Peniche were cast in the lead roles. On 13 August 2026, Samadhi Zendejas and Eugenio Siller joined the cast. Filming of the telenovela began on 18 August 2026.
