= Sorángel =

- Genre: Telenovela
- Created by: Julio César Mármol
- Starring: Hilda Carrero; Eduardo Serrano; Martín Lantigua; Mary Soliani
- Country of origin: Venezuela
- Original language: Spanish
- No. of episodes: 55

Original release
- Network: Venevisión
- Release: 1982

Sorángel is a 1982 Venezuelan telenovela written by Julio César Mármol and aired on Venevisión. Hilda Carrero and Eduardo Serrano starred as the main protagonists.

== Plot ==
Luis Enrique Cortez is a principled civil engineer who works hard in his job to assist his father and brothers. Sorángel is a young woman who has completed her medical studies at the university and returns home to her mother Amparo, a widower and pension owner, her grandmother María Benita and their maid Ramirita.

Sorángel falls in love with Luis Enrique but he is already married to Dulce María Suárez, the daughter of wealthy man named Abraham José Suárez. Abraham is fascinated by Sorángel's beauty and wants to marry her even though he knows she is in love with his son-in-law. Dulce María becomes paralyzed as a result of an accident. She becomes physically and emotionally traumatized knowing she can no longer be a classical dancer and knowing he husband is in love with another woman.

Abraham José comes with a plan to become closer to Sorángel and hires her to be Dulce María's caretaker. It is here that Sorángel discovers Luis Enrique is a married man. Later, Dulce María discovers the relationship between her husband and Sorángel and decides to use her disability to manipulate him, to the point that when she discovers she has a feeling in her legs, she pretends she is still disabled. Abraham José manages to later trap Sorángel into marrying him when she discovers she is pregnant.

== Cast ==
- Hilda Carrero as Sorángel
- Eduardo Serrano as Luis Enrique Cortez
- Martín Lantigua as Abraham José Suárez
- Yolanda Mendez as Amparo
- Tony Rodríguez
- Renee De Pallás as María Benita
- Hilda Blanco as Ramirita
- Mary Soliani as Dulce María Suárez

== See also ==
- List of telenovelas of Venevisión
