= El sol sale para todos =

- Genre: Telenovela; Romance; Drama
- Created by: César Miguel Rondón
- Written by: César Miguel Rondón; Napoleon Graziani; Isamar Hernandez
- Directed by: Grazio d'Angelo
- Starring: Hilda Carrero; Eduardo Serrano; Corina Azopardo; Guillermo Dávila; Herminia Martínez
- Opening theme: No renunciaré by Jorge Rigó
- Country of origin: Venezuela
- Original language: Spanish
- No. of episodes: 158

Production
- Executive producer: Arnaldo Limansky
- Production locations: Caracas, Venezuela
- Running time: 45 minutes
- Production company: Venevisión

Original release
- Network: Venevisión
- Release: May 20 – December 1, 1986

Related
- Los Donatti; Esa muchacha de ojos café

El sol sale para todos (English title: The sun rises for everyone) is a Venezuelan telenovela written by César Miguel Rondón and produced by Venevisión in 1986.

Hilda Carrero and Eduardo Serrano starred as the main protagonists with Henry Galué, Herminia Martínez and Reneé de Pallás as the main antagonists.

== Plot ==
Magdalena is a mature woman with dreams and struggles to improve herself by attending university and working, but her husband Julian does not support her, preferring she limits herself to being a housewife and mother. She becomes a frustrated and disappointed woman for not receiving support and affection from her husband, aspiring to having an ideal marriage similar to the one her parents have. At university, she meets Santiago, a captivating man who is her professor. Little by little, their relationship grows and they begin to discover each other, as Santiago is stuck in a loveless marriage to Ana Cristina who pays little attention to their son. Will they be able to give it all up?.

== Cast ==
- Hilda Carrero as Magdalena Pimentel de Zerpa
- Eduardo Serrano as Santiago Falcón
- Corina Azopardo as Manuela Larrazábal
- Guillermo Dávila as Luis Ignacio "Lucho" Pimentel
- Herminia Martínez as Ana Cristina Arismendi
- José Oliva as León Benigno Pimentel
- Eva Blanco as Cruz del Carmen "Crucita" Chacón de Pimentel
- Raúl Xiquez as Diógenes Arismendi
- Reneé de Pallás as Doña Florentina
- Henry Galué as Julián Zerpa
- Carmen Victoria Pérez as Antonieta
- Alma Ingianni as Aurora
- Vicente Tepedino as Felipe Larrazábal "Felipito"
- Ramón Hinojosa as Chonchón
- Fernando Flores as Damaso Arrieta
- Armando Jiménez as Juliancito Zerpa
- Enrique Alzugaray as Don Crisanto
- Esther Orjuela as Soledad
- Eduardo Gadea Perez as Padre Toñito Chacón
- Jimmy Verdum as Versalles
- Esperanza Magaz as Jacinta
