= Cumbres Borrascosas (1976 TV series) =

- Genre: Telenovela
- Created by: Original Story: Emily Brontë; Adaptation: Delia Fiallo
- Directed by: Grazio D' Angelo
- Starring: José Bardina; Elluz Peraza; Eduardo Serrano; Mary Soliani
- Opening theme: "Beyond the Forest" by Max Steiner
- Country of origin: Venezuela
- Original language: Spanish
- No. of episodes: 48

Original release
- Network: Venevisión
- Release: 1976 – 1976

Related
- Cumbres Borrascosas (1963); Cumbres Borrascosas (1964); Cumbres Borrascosas (1979)

Cumbres Borrascosas (English: Wuthering Heights) is a Venezuelan telenovela written and adapted by Delia Fiallo for Venevisión in 1976, based on the 1847 novel Wuthering Heights by Emily Brontë.

The series stars José Bardina, Elluz Peraza, Eduardo Serrano and Mary Soliani.

== Cast ==
- José Bardina as Heathcliff
- Elluz Peraza as Catalina
- América Alonso as María
- Martín Lantigua as Enrique
- Eduardo Serrano as Edgardo
- Mary Soliani as Isabel
- Caridad Canelón as Cathy
- Raúl Xiquez as José
- Eva Blanco as Nelly
- Humberto García as Lockwood
- Ivonne Attas
- Henry Galué as Hareton

== See also ==
- List of telenovelas of Venevisión
