= Miss Venezuela 1988 =

35th edition of the Miss Venezuela competition

- Date: February 5, 1988
- Presenters: Gilberto Correa; Carmen Victoria Pérez; Raúl Velasco
- Entertainment: Chayanne, Karina, José Luis Rodríguez, Mirla Castellanos, Proyecto M
- Venue: Teatro Municipal, Caracas, Venezuela
- Broadcaster: Venevision
- Entrants: 26
- Placements: 8
- Winner: Yajaira Vera; Miranda

Miss Venezuela 1988 was the 35th Miss Venezuela pageant, was held in Caracas, Venezuela on February 5, 1988, after weeks of events. The winner of the pageant was Yajaira Vera.

The pageant was broadcast live on Venevision from the Teatro Municipal in Caracas. At the conclusion of the final night of competition, outgoing titleholder Inés Maria Calero, crowned Yajaira Vera of Miranda as the new Miss Venezuela. Two new titles were added for a total of 5 titles to be contested.

== Results ==
=== Placements ===
- Miss Venezuela 1988 - Yajaira Vera (Miss Miranda)
- Miss World Venezuela 1988 - Emma Rabbe (Miss Distrito Federal)
- Miss Venezuela International 1988 - María Eugenia Duarte (Miss Península Goajira)
- Miss Wonderland Venezuela 1988 - Constanza Giner (Miss Aragua)
- Miss Venezuela Latina 1988 - Marilisa Maronese (Miss Portuguesa)

The runners-up were:

- 1st runner-up - Nancy García (Miss Táchira)
- 2nd runner-up - Joanne Goiri (Miss Lara)
- 3rd runner-up - Livia Castellanos (Miss Municipio Libertador)

=== Special awards ===
- Miss Photogenic (voted by press reporters) - Marilisa Maronese (Miss Portuguesa)
- Miss Congeniality - Livia Castellanos (Miss Municipio Libertador)
- Miss Elegance - Constanza Giner (Miss Aragua)

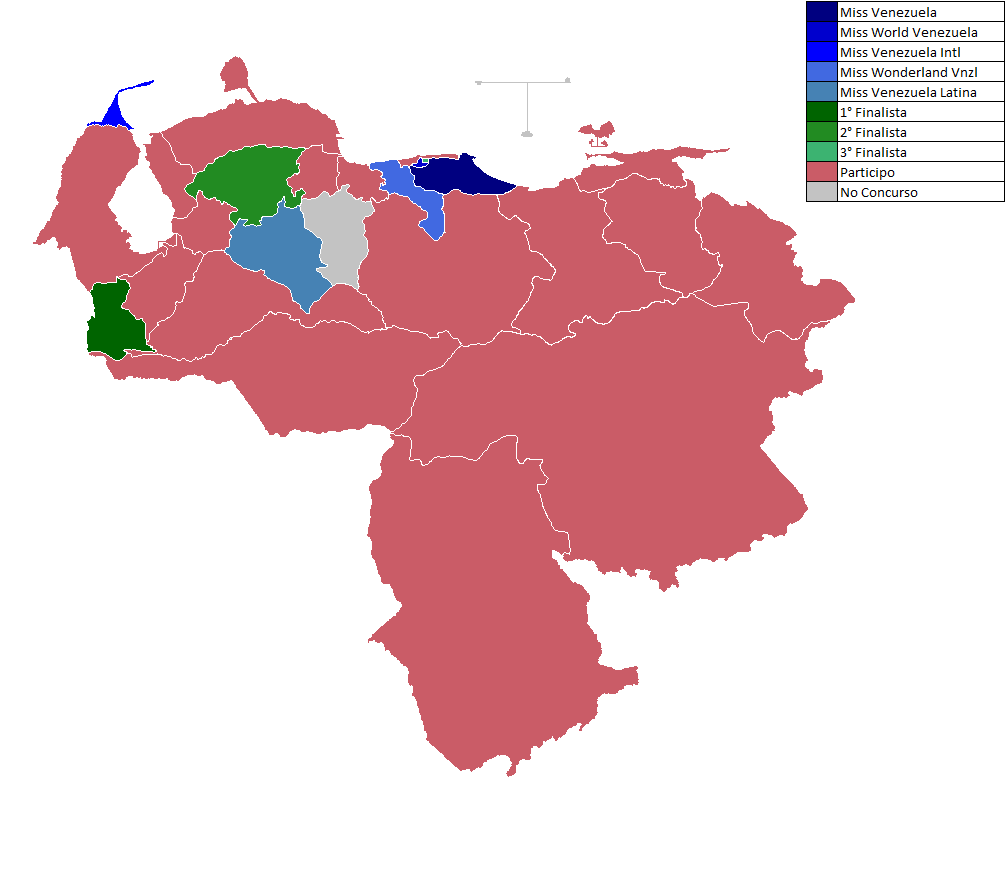
Map of results.

== Contestants ==
The Miss Venezuela 1988 delegates are:

- Miss Amazonas - Graciela Beatriz Hubscher Solines
- Miss Anzoátegui - Marietta Limia Schuller
- Miss Apure - Begoña Sánchez-Biezma Fernández
- Miss Aragua - Constanza Enriqueta Giner Barreto
- Miss Barinas - Yuli Karina García Espinoza
- Miss Bolívar - Maria José Villaseco Blanco
- Miss Carabobo - Pamela Pascal Wildhaber Zeiss
- Miss Costa Oriental - Marianellys Pilar Sánchez de Andrade
- Miss Delta Amacuro - Bernardete Elsa María De Nobrega -Nobrega-
- Distrito Federal - Emma Marina Irmgard Rabbe Ramírez
- Miss Falcón - Carolina Irene Rode Pelckmann
- Miss Guárico - Bertha Elena Fuentes Leon
- Miss Lara - Joanne Goiri González
- Miss Mérida - Yazmín Quintero Dávila
- Miss Miranda - Yajaira Cristina Vera Roldán
- Miss Monagas - Marisabel Valdés Fairfoot
- Miss Municipio Libertador - Livia Elizabeth Castellanos Leiva
- Miss Municipio Vargas - Rita Rosina Verreos
- Miss Nueva Esparta - Sara Cristina Salomón Ivanovich
- Miss Península Goajira - Maria Eugenia Duarte Lugo
- Miss Portuguesa - Mariana Elizabeth (Marilisa) Maronese Rivetta
- Miss Sucre - Marlene Klara Herner
- Miss Táchira - Nancy Elena García Amor
- Miss Trujillo - Francesca Cerro
- Miss Yaracuy - Elizabeth Tibisay López Villavicencio
- Miss Zulia - Maribel del Carmen Colina Marín

Notes

- Marilisa Maronese Rivetta (Portuguesa) later became in Chayanne's wife.
- Rita Rosina Verreos (Municipio Vargas) competed on Survivor: Fiji (United States) in 2007.
