= Marilyn Plessmann =

Venezuelan model and beauty pageant titleholder

- Born: Marilyn Plessmann Martínez; June 3, 1956 (age 70); Valle de la Pascua, Guárico, Venezuela
- Height: 1.76 m (5 ft 9 in)
- Beauty pageant titleholder
- Hair color: Light Brown
- Eye color: Brown

Marilyn Plessmann Martínez is a Venezuelan model and beauty pageant titleholder. She was the Miss Venezuela International titleholder for 1972 and was the official representative of Venezuela to the Miss International 1972 pageant held in Tokyo, Japan, when she classified in the Top 15 semifinalists.

Plessmann competed in the national beauty pageant Miss Venezuela 1972 and obtained the title of Miss Venezuela International. She represented the Guárico state.

Preceded by Sonia Ledezma	Miss Venezuela International; 1972	Succeeded by Hilda Carrero
