= Pobre millonaria =

- Genre: Telenovela; Romance
- Created by: Vivel Nouel
- Written by: Carmelo Castro; Pedro Soucho
- Directed by: Aldo Salvini; Caridad Delgado; Gerardo Herrera
- Starring: Gianella Neyra; Jorge Aravena; Roxana Díaz; Eduardo Serrano; Kassandra Tepper
- Opening theme: "Solo" by Hector Montaner
- Country of origin: Panama
- Original language: Spanish
- No. of episodes: 100

Production
- Executive producers: Margarita Morales Macedo; Jorge Fèlix
- Cinematography: Alberto Vega; Renato Diaz
- Editor: Fiorela Suito
- Running time: 41-44 minutes
- Production company: Venevisión

Original release
- Network: Venevisión; Univision
- Release: May 15 – August 16, 2008

Pobre millonaria (Poor Millionaire) is a 2008 Panamanian-Venezuelan telenovela produced by Venevisión International. The telenovela was entirely shot in Panama City and it stars Gianella Neyra and Jorge Aravena as the main protagonists while Roxana Díaz stars as the main villain. This is the reunion project of Gianella Neyra and Jorge Aravena after Peruvian telenovela Girasoles para Lucía.

The telenovela is a remake of the 1993 Venezuelan telenovela Por amarte tanto.

== Plot ==
Isabella del Castillo Landaeta is the daughter of multi-millionaire Fernando Andres del Castillo, owner of the country's largest international commerce consortium. However, as the only heir, she is less concerned with her father's businesses. Although she has several post-graduate degrees in Mathematics, Isabella is a loner who spends most of her time at her family's countryside ranch. This is because Isabella has always felt inadequate and unworthy due to the fact that her father has spent her whole life unfavorably comparing her to her late mother Amanda who he always refers to as the perfect woman and mother. Amanda died while giving birth to Isabella.

Concerned about the future of his business empire, Fernando Andres forces Isabella to begin working at his company so that she can begin to familiarize herself with the business that will one day become hers. It is here that she will encounter the man who will make her experience both pain and suffering. Luis Arturo is a logistics manager for Tritan, the company owned by the Del Castillo family. Luis Arturo is a handsome man who has several flings with women, but never commits to a serious relationship. After having a series of misunderstandings with Isabella, who he later discovers is the owner's daughter, he tries to make it up to her by offering to be her guide as she familiarizes herself with the new job. Isabella, who is attracted to Luis Arturo, accepts his help.

This is about to change with the arrival of Damiana, Isabella's cousin who has spent most of her life abroad. Damiana has a striking physical resemblance to her dead aunt, Amanda, and Fernando Andres is totally captivated by her. Damiana uses this to her advantage to manipulate Feranndo Andres in order to satisfy her ambitions. She hatches a plan of deceit that involves Luis Arturo. they make a wager on who can be able to obtain the Del Castillo fortune first: he by seducing Isabella or she by seducing Fernando Andres.

In the process, Luis Arturo falls in love with Isabella, much to Damiana's anger, for she has also fallen in love with Luis Arturo. Although he tries to make amends, he is too late, for Damiana tells Isabella the truth before he can. Filled with rage and humiliation, Isabella decides to take control of her life. She transforms herself into a beautiful and powerful woman who is determined to become a powerful and shrewd woman.

== Cast ==
- Gianella Neyra as Isabella del Castillo Landaeta
- Jorge Aravena as Luis Arturo Ramirez Santana
- Roxana Díaz as Damiana Grisanti Landaeta
- Eduardo Serrano as Fernando Andres del Castillo
- Rossana Uribe as Luciana Landaeta vda. de Grisanti
- Kassandra Tepper as Yolanda Ines Hernandez
- Vicente Tependino as Diego Salvador Medina Alonso
- Ash Olivera as Sofia
- Paola Toyos as Diana Eloisa
- Lucho Gotti as Geronimo
- Mara Caponi as Esperanza
