= Rosita Alonso =

Argentine-Colombian actress (1943–2025)

María Rosa Alonso de Camacho (25 January 1943 – 12 June 2025), known as Rosita Alonso, was an Argentine-Colombian theater and television actress.

== Life and career ==
Alonso was born in Santa Fe, Argentina in 1943, and moved to Colombia in the 1960s. She began acting in the theatre in Colombia, appearing in over 200 plays.

In 1963 she participated in one of the first telenovelas produced in Colombia, El 0597 está ocupado, based on an Argentine radio drama of a similar name. She appeared in a number of other telenovelas during the 1960s, 1970s and 1980s, including: Viaje al pasado, Estafa de amor, Rasputín, El Virrey Solís, La espada de papel, Los dueños del poder and La rosa de los vientos.

In 1999 she received a nomination for the TV and Novelas Awards for her performance in Dios se lo pague. In 2005 she portrayed the role of Mercedes Rubio in the telenovela Los Reyes. Her final role occurred in 2008, in the series No Return.

Alonso died in Bogotá on 12 June 2025, at the age of 82.
