= Macarena (TV series) =

- Also known as: Greed and Desire
- Created by: Ligia Lezama
- Written by: Tahiri Díaz Acosta
- Directed by: Rafael Gómez
- Starring: Kiara; Luis José Santander; Elluz Peraza; Miguel Alcantara
- Opening theme: Liberame by Kiara
- Ending theme: Liberames by Kiara
- Country of origin: Venezuela
- Original language: Spanish
- No. of episodes: 200

Production
- Producer: Arquímedes Rivero
- Cinematography: Giovanni Zebellini
- Editor: Carlos Garcia
- Running time: 45 minutes
- Production company: Venevisión

Original release
- Network: Venevisión
- Release: August 25, 1992 – April 1993

Related
- Bellísima; Amor de papel

Macarena is a 1992 Venezuelan telenovela written by Ligia Lezama and broadcast on Venevisión. Kiara and Luis José Santander starred as the main protagonists, with Elluz Peraza and Miguel Alcantara starred as the antagonists.

Kiara who starred in the main role, sang the theme song for the telenovela
