= Hilda Carrero =

Venezuelan model

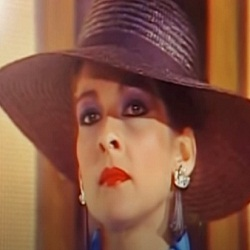
- Born: Hilda Elvira Carrero García; December 26, 1951; Caracas, Venezuela
- Died: January 28, 2002 (aged 50); Caracas, Venezuela
- Height: 1.70 m (5 ft 7 in)
- Beauty pageant titleholder
- Years active: 1973–2002
- Hair color: Brown
- Eye color: Brown

Hilda Elvira Carrero García (December 26, 1951 – January 28, 2002) was a Venezuelan actress, model and beauty pageant titleholder, known for her participation in series as Las Amazonas, El sol sale para todos, La heredera, and others.

== Biography ==
Hilda Carrero was born in Caracas, Venezuela on December 26, 1951 from parents from Venezuela as well. Her father from Tachira State and her mother from Caracas. More details about her family are not known.

She participated at Miss Venezuela 1973 pageant, representing Tachira state. She got the fourth place, which allowed her to be the official representative of Venezuela to the Miss International 1973 pageant held in Tokyo, Japan, on October 13, 1973, when she classified in the Top 15 semifinalists. She also participated in the 1974 International Coffee Reign, in Manizales, Colombia, where she got the third place. Later, she studied at University of Santa María, where obtained a Bachelor's degree in Business Administration. Then entered the world of entertainment.

Carrero made her debut as actress in 1975, at the program Patrulla 88, in Venezolana de Televisión. Then, she joined Radio Caracas Televisión, where she performed small roles as an actress. That same year she joined Venevisión to play a co-starring role with Alberto Marín in the telenovela Emilia (1979), starring Elluz Peraza and Eduardo Serrano. She became popular with the "Mi puchi", a term with which she referred to the man she loved in the plot of the series.

Her first leading role was in the telenovela Migaja that same year. Over 10 years, she formed a well-known television couple with actor Eduardo Serrano, achieving high levels of audience.

In 1985, she met the Portuguese-Venezuelan businessman Juan Fernandes, whom she married in December 1986. At the height of her artistic career, she decided to leave her profession and devote herself to her marriage. She had two children, Joao and Johana Fátima.

In 1991 she returned to television for beginning in animation, specifically on the Televen channel, where she would lead the program La Noche Musical.

In 1997 was diagnosed with cancer. She died on Monday, January 28, 2002, at 9:00 in the morning, at the La Floresta clinic, at 50. Her last wish was that the news of her death be made known to the media after the burial ceremony. Her remains rest in the La Guairita cemetery in the eastern part of Caracas.

== Filmography ==
- El sol sale para todos (1986) Telenovela .... Magdalena Pimentel
- Muerte en El Barrio (1985) Telenovela .... Lina Suárez
- Las amazonas (1985) Telenovela .... Isabel Lizárraga
- Julia (1984) Telenovela .... Julia
- La Venganza (1983) Telenovela .... Iris
- La heredera (1982) Telenovela .... Cristina Zambrano García
- Querida Mamá (1982) Telenovela .... María Victoria (Marivi)
- Sorángel (1981) Telenovela .... Sorangel
- Andreína (1981) Telenovela .... Andreína
- El despertar (1980) Telenovela
- Emilia (1979) Telenovela .... Nereida Pardo-Figueroa
- Rosángela (1979) Telenovela .... Leticia
- María del Mar (1978) Telenovela .... María del Coral/ Miriam".
- Migaja (1977) Telenovela
- Iliana (1977) Telenovela
- Sabrina (1976) Telenovela .... Rosita
- Angélica (1976) Telenovela .... Farina
- Patrulla 88 (1975) Series

Preceded by Marilyn Plessmann	Miss Venezuela International; 1973	Succeeded by Marisela Carderera
