= La inolvidable =

Television series

- Genre: Telenovela; Romance; Drama
- Created by: Humberto "Kico" Olivieri
- Written by: Humberto "Kico" Olivieri; Sonia Nobre de Melo; Manuel Mendoza; Carlos González Vega; Marco Tulio Socorro
- Directed by: Tony Rodríguez
- Starring: Rafael Romero; Christianne Gout; Flor Nuñez; Eduardo Serrano
- Opening theme: Amores de provincia by Félix Valentino
- Country of origin: Venezuela
- Original language: Spanish
- No. of episodes: 120

Production
- Producer: Henry Márquez
- Production company: RCTV

Original release
- Network: RCTV
- Release: March 1 – September 21, 1996

La Inolvidable (in English: Unforgettable) is a Venezuelan telenovela written by Humberto 'Kiko' Olivieri and produced by Radio Caracas Televisión. This telenovela lasted 120 episodes and was distributed internationally by RCTV International.

Rafael Romero and Christianne Gout starred as the protagonists.

== Synopsis ==
One night in 1935, a European travelling show arrives in a small town. A young man is the main attraction: he is Simón Leal, an escape artist whose death-defying feats astound even the staunchest skeptic. But Simón is no stranger to this town... he was born there, in a dark wooded area 25 years earlier, amid the agonizing screams of a mother he never knew and the deafening silence of a father who had left him an orphan before he had taken his first breath. Simón's parents were murdered on a November night in 1910..., and since birth, he learned to fight for his life with a vengeance. As he prepares for his first act, Simón does not realize that the course of event will change his life forever. Gradually, he will uncover the identity of his parents murderer... documented in a film that was taken almost by accident, but that for years was hidden away by the malicious and greedy people who would do anything to keep it from being made public. Simón will take the information on the film to produce a movie of his own: a movie which will expose a prominent Colonel in the government as the assassin. The film's director and lead actress will be Colonel's own children. But destiny has a surprise in store for Simón during his stay in that town, he will find that love is much stronger than his desire for revenge. Simón Leal will fall hopelessly in love with Maria Teresa Montero, the star of his movie, and the favorite daughter of his arch enemy, Colonel Maximiliano Montero. Maria Teresa is the beautiful daughter of the wealthy and politically powerful Montero family. To Simón her kind nature and unrivaled beauty become unforgettable. But Maria Teresas's tyrannical father will resort to deceit and even murder in an attempt to separate her from Simón. Ultimately, Maria Teresa will be forced to marry a man that she doesn't love, and carry with her the burden of believing that the love of her life is lost to her forever. Maria Teresa and Simón's love story, wrought with turmoil, will unleash a chain of conspiracy violence, and envy that will shake the foundations of their families and the society that they live in. But it is a passion so strong that it will fight for its own life... and Simón and Maria Teresa will come to learn that all other struggles pale in comparison. There is no escape from the bond of love.

== Cast ==
- Rafael Romero as Simon Leal
- Christianne Gout as Maria Teresa Montero
- Flor Nuñez as Jacinta Leal
- Juan Carlos Alarcón as Juan Vicente Montero
- Alberto Alifa as Astolfo Aristizabal
- Daniela Alvarado as Virginia Calcaño
- Dad Dager as Azucena
- Pedro Duran as Macabeo Carratu
- Guillermo Ferran as Jean Paul
- Fernando Flores as Gumersindo
- Juan Frankis as Celso
- Freddy Galavis as Poggiolli
- Maria Luisa Lamata as Natividad
- Indira Leal as Sagrario Montero
- Felix Loreto as Francisco Calcaño
- Esperanza Magaz as La Abadesa
- Herminia Martínez as Mercedes Montero
- Julio Mujica as Arjimiro Briceño
- Martha Pabon as Micaela
- Amalia Perez Diaz as Leonor Calcaño
- Freddy Salazar as Dr. Montilla
- Tania Sarabia as Memela
- Eduardo Serrano as Maximiliano Montero
- Roque Valero as Funes
- Engelbert Rosero as main gypsy
