= Sueño contigo =

- Genre: Telenovela; Drama
- Created by: Pilar Romero
- Written by: Pilar Romero; Jose Luis Contreras; Freddy Hernandez
- Directed by: Renato Gutierrez
- Starring: José Luis Rodríguez; Elluz Peraza
- Opening theme: Sueño Contigo by José Luis Rodríguez
- Country of origin: Venezuela
- Original language: Spanish
- No. of episodes: 34

Production
- Producer: Raul Diaz
- Production company: Venevisión

Original release
- Network: Venevisión
- Release: January 7 – February 16, 1988

Related
- Y la luna también

Sueño contigo is a Venezuelan telenovela written by Pilar Romero and produced by Venevisión in 1988. Elluz Peraza and José Luis Rodríguez star as the protagonists . with José Luis Rodríguez singing the theme song for the telenovela.

== Cast ==
- Elluz Peraza as Silvia Patricia Hermida
- José Luis Rodríguez as Jorge Leonardo Riera
- Rafael Briceño as Alejandro Hermida
- América Alonso as Margarita de Riera
- Chelo Rodríguez as Fabiana
- Luis Gerardo Núñez as Agustín Riera
- Elba Escobar as Livia Noriega
- María Cristina Lozada as Aurora
- Esperanza Magaz as Aurora de Hermida
- Francisco Ferrari as Héctor Riera
- Chela D'Gar as Felicidad
- Jose Cristancho as Piolin
