= Adorable Mónica =

1990 Venezuelan telenovela

- Genre: Telenovela; Romance; Drama
- Created by: Delia Fiallo
- Written by: Ana Mercedes Escámez; Milagros del Valle; Irene Calcaño; Iliana Gómez
- Directed by: Carlos Izquierdo; Marcos Reyes Andrade; Arquímedes Rivero
- Starring: Emma Rabbe; Guillermo Dávila; Mirla Castellanos
- Opening theme: Yo Necesito Más de Ti by Guillermo Dávila
- Ending theme: Yo Necesito Más de Ti by Guillermo Dávila
- Country of origin: Venezuela
- Original language: Spanish
- No. of episodes: 211

Production
- Executive producer: Valentina Párraga
- Producers: Raúl Fleites; María Ángela Zelkowicz
- Production location: Caracas
- Cinematography: Silviaines Vallejo
- Running time: 41-44 minutes
- Production company: Venevisión

Original release
- Network: Venevisión
- Release: October 24, 1990 – 29 June 1991

Related
- La heredera

Adorable Monica is a Venezuelan telenovela produced by Venevisión in 1990 and distributed internationally by Venevisión International. The telenovela is written by Ana Mercedes Escámez and Milagros del Valle, based on Delia Fiallo's La heredera, and starred Emma Rabbe and Guillermo Dávila as the main protagonists with Mirla Castellanos as the main antagonist.

== Synopsis ==
Monica Suárez is a young woman from the provinces who moves to the capital, where she faces personal and family conflicts. Her experiences involve an unexpected encounter with her father, a complicated relationship with her aunt, a close friendship, and a dispute over an inheritance. She also becomes involved with Luis Alfredo, a young lawyer, and his twin brother, who is a musician.

== Cast ==
- Emma Rabbe as Monica Suarez
- Guillermo Dávila as Luis Alfredo
- Belen Marrero as Pierina
- Mirla Castellanos as Consuelo
- Olga Castillo as Abuela
- Sandra Bruzon as Qince
- Rolando Barral as Joaquin
- Julio Capote as Mario
- Isabel Herrera as Carlota
- Alba Valve as Ibiza
- Adela Romero as Rosario
- Angela Fuste as Margarita
- Gonzalo Velutini as Karl von Krup
- Carlos Carrero as Bernardo
- Andrés Izaguirre as Juan Carlos
- Azabache as Perla Negra

== See also ==
- List of famous telenovelas
- List of programs broadcast by Venevision
- List of telenovelas of Venevisión
