= La criada de la granja =

Venezuelan telenovela

- Genre: Telenovela
- Starring: José Torres; Aura Ochoa
- Country of origin: Venezuela
- Original language: Spanish

Original release
- Network: Televisa
- Release: 1953

La criada de la granja is a 1953 Venezuelan telenovela broadcast on Televisa (later known as Venevisión). It started the Venezuelan actors José Torres, best known for his role Tacupay in the 1995 telenovela Ka Ina, and Aura Ochoa.

== History ==
La criada de la granja was the first telenovela that was filmed in Venezuela in the 50s. The telenovela had a duration of 15 minutes, and was broadcast weekly from Monday to Friday at 7 p.m on Televisa, currently known as Venevisión. At that time, each episode was filming live during the telenovela broadcast. Until later with the arrival of the video tape, the episodes could be recorded and subsequently broadcast. There is currently very little data on who wrote the story.
