= Doña Bárbara (1967 TV series) =

- Genre: Telenovela
- Based on: Doña Bárbara by Rómulo Gallegos
- Written by: Delia Fiallo
- Directed by: Paul Antillano
- Starring: Lupita Ferrer
- Country of origin: Venezuela
- Original language: Spanish

Original release
- Network: Venevisión
- Release: 1967 – 1968

Doña Bárbara is a 1967 Venezuelan telenovela written by Delia Fiallo and based on the 1929 novel written by Rómulo Gallegos. The telenovela was produced by Venevisión. Lupita Ferrer starred as the main protagonist.

== Cast ==
- Lupita Ferrer as Doña Bárbara
- Esperanza Magaz as Marisela Barquero
- Henry Galue as Lorenzo Barquero
- José Bardina as Balbino Paiba
- Cesar Delgado as Melquíades "El Brujeador"
- Carlos Camara Jr. as El Socio
- Emperatiz Spanic as Paola Barquero
