= Fabiola (TV series) =

- Genre: Telenovela; Romance; Drama
- Created by: Delia Fiallo
- Written by: Ana Mercedes Escamez; Milagros del Valle
- Directed by: Édgar Liendo; Arquímedes Rivero
- Starring: Alba Roversi; Guillermo Dávila
- Theme music composer: Rudy La Scala
- Opening theme: Fabiola by Guillermo Dávila
- Country of origin: Venezuela
- Original language: Spanish
- No. of episodes: 164

Production
- Executive producer: Carlos Suarez
- Producer: Marisol Campos
- Production company: Venevisión

Original release
- Network: Venevisión
- Release: June 5, 1989 – February 9, 1990

Related
- Emilia (1979)

Fabiola is a Venezuelan telenovela produced by Venevisión in 1989. An original story written by Delia Fiallo based on the radionovela Tu mundo y el mío, this version was adapted by Ana Mercedes Escamez and Milagros del Valle. The telenovela was distributed internationally by Venevisión International.

Alba Roversi and Guillermo Dávila starred as the main protagonists.

== Synopsis ==
Fabiola and her family suffer the disgrace of passing from a very wealthy life to that of total poverty, after her father's death. Doing translations and giving lessons at home, Fabiola achieves to support her grandmother Maria Manuela, her sister Marian and her brother Alberto. This is how, one day, she ends up at Carlos Alberto Roman's house, to give him, and his little sister, lessons. However, at the same time, she wins the friendship and acceptance of the whole family: father, mother, young daughter and specially, Carlos Alberto, who fall in love with her from the very beginning. However, as a typical "playboy" he tries to take advantage of her, and discovers she is not that type of girl; so he decides to forget the whole thing for a while only to realize he is truly in love with her. He returns to Fabiola to ask her in marriage. This marriage will encounter several problems but a dramatic reconciliation will bring back the faith and happiness they deserve.

== Cast ==
- Alba Roversi as Fabiola
- Guillermo Dávila as Carlos Alberto
- Miguel de León as Alejandro Fuentes
- Loly Sanchez as Veronica
- Anabel Gracia as Marian
- Chela D'Gar as Maria Manuela
- Laura Termini as Laurita
