= Amor sin fronteras =

- Created by: José Manuel Peláez
- Directed by: Ibrahim Guerra
- Starring: Luly Bossa; Mariano Álvarez; Rosita Alonso
- Countries of origin: Venezuela; Colombia
- Original language: Spanish
- No. of episodes: 96

Production
- Running time: 45 minutes
- Production companies: RCN Televisión; Venevisión

Original release
- Network: Canal A Venevisión
- Release: 1992 – 1993

Amor Sin Fronteras is a 1992 telenovela produced by Venezuelan television network Venevisión and the Colombian production company RCN Televisión. Luly Bossa and Mariano Álvarez starred as the main protagonists. The telenovela was written by José Manuel Peláez and lasted 96 episodes.

== Plot ==
Amor sin Fronteras is the story of Victoria Mayo, a beautiful woman who is the heiress to the Victoria Corporation. Her husband Carlos Ruiz starts becoming distant towards her due to her ever-increasing jealousy. This situation leads Carlos to meet Natalia Arenales, a woman he later falls in love with. His relationship with Natalia makes him forget that he is married. This leads to a series of confrontations that later lead to the mysterious disappearance of Victoria. But Victoria much alive and will use a woman named Teresa Rios help her get revenge against her husband.

== Cast ==
- Luly Bossa as Victoria Mayo
- Mariano Álvarez as Carlos Ruiz
- Lucy Mendoza
- Rosita Alonso
- Lourdes Colon
