= El perdón de los pecados =

- Genre: Telenovela; Romance; Drama
- Created by: Ibsen Martínez
- Written by: Ibsen Martínez; Mónica Montañés; Henry Herrera; Eli Bravo
- Directed by: Claudio Callao
- Starring: Carolina Perpetuo; Daniel Alvarado; Elluz Peraza; Yanis Chimaras; Milena Santander
- Opening theme: Verdades Amargas by Soledad Bravo
- Country of origin: Venezuela
- Original language: Spanish
- No. of episodes: 123

Production
- Executive producer: Arnaldo Limansky
- Producer: Laura Rodríguez
- Cinematography: Carlos Medina
- Running time: 41-44 minutes
- Production company: Venevisión

Original release
- Network: Venevisión
- Release: 1996 – January 22, 1997

El perdón de los pecados (English title: The forgiveness of sins) is a Venezuelan telenovela written by Ibsen Martínez and produced by Venevisión in 1996.

Carolina Perpetuo and Daniel Alvarado starred as the main protagonists, accompanied by Elluz Peraza, Yanis Chimaras and Milena Santander.

== Plot ==
Calixto Maldonado is a working-class man who owes everything to Augusto Marquez-Cata, an ambitious politician who is his best friend. Due to their strong friendship, Calixto has the opportunity of entering and interacting in the social and financial circles of high society, therefore making him Augusto's figurehead. However, their close friendship will be put to the test with the arrival of a young and beautiful woman with two names, Margarita Guanchez who comes from an affluent family in the provinces to escape to the city.

== Cast ==
- Carolina Perpetuo as Margarita Guanchez / Margot Fuentes
- Daniel Alvarado as Calixto Maldonado
- Elluz Peraza as Amnerys Balza
- Yanis Chimaras as Augusto Márquez Cata
- Milena Santander as Ninfa
- Miguel Ángel Landa as Arturo Ramos
- Raúl Amundaray as Marco Aurelio Antonioni
- Janin Barboza as Eugenia
- Javier Valcárcel as Efrain
- Elizabeth Morales
- Mauricio González as Julian Guanchez
- Isabel Moreno as Hilda Cristina Ramos
- Pedro Marthan
- Alejandro Corona as Filadelfo
- Lucy Orta
- Marcos Campos as Ivan
- Marisela Buitriago
- María Elena Coello as Ana Teresa
- Elio Pietrini as Pujols
- Carmen Francia
- Zamira Segura
- Zoe Bolívar
- Aitor Gaviria as Osvaldo
- Tatiana Padrón
- Julio Mujica
- Martha Tarazona
- Umberto Buonocuore as Mario
- Ana Martínez
- Estrella Castellanos
