= Valeria (2009 TV series) =

- Genre: Telenovela
- Created by: Alberto Gómez
- Directed by: Raúl De La Nuez
- Starring: Alejandra Lazcano; Jorge Reyes; Carolina Tejera; Bobby Larios; Fernando Carrera
- Opening theme: "Valeria" by Gloria Trevi
- Countries of origin: Venezuela; United States
- Original language: Spanish
- No. of episodes: 174

Production
- Executive producers: Arquimides Rivero; Peter Tinoco; Ana Teresa Arismendi
- Producer: Jeanette Gómez
- Production locations: Miami, Florida
- Running time: 40–44 minutes
- Production company: Venevisión

Original release
- Network: Univision; Venevisión
- Release: March 10 – October 16, 2009

Valeria is a Venezuelan-American telenovela produced by Venevisión Productions. The telenovela premiered on Univision on March 10, 2009, at the 2pm/1c timeslot.

Filming of the telenovela ended in September 2008, and it was first released in June 2008 in Ecuador. It aired in Venezuela on July 14, 2009, on Venevisión Plus at the 10pm timeslot with re-airings at 1pm timeslot. It also aired in Spain, Peru, El Salvador, Romania, Croatia, and other countries.

Characters of Leopoldo and Manon are played by the two siblings – Jorge Reyes and his sister Claudia.

== Plot ==
Leopoldo, member of the Riquelme family, and Valeria, daughter of a poor worker, will have to fight temptations and other situations that force them apart in order to find true love in Miami, because she was raped by Leopoldo's brother Juan Ignacio, who is in protection by his father Samuel, very rich advocate.

== Cast ==
- Alejandra Lazcano as Valeria Hidalgo, daughter of Hilda and Julio, mother of Laurita, in love with Leopoldo
- Jorge Reyes as Leopoldo Riquelme, son of Piedad and Alfredo, in love with Valeria, father of Laurita
- Carolina Tejera as Miroslava Montemar de Riquelme, in love with Lepoldo, hates Valeria, ends up in an asylum and dies of heart attack
- Bobby Larios as David Barrios, in love with Valeria but then with Manon, best friend of Leopoldo
- Fernando Carrera as Samuel Riquelme, killed by Estrella in defense
- Leonardo Daniel as Renato Rivera, a doctor, in love with Estrella, killed on order of Samuel
- Mara Croatto as Estrella Granados, Samuel's lover and real mother of Tatiana
- Flavio Caballero as Alfredo Galan, ex-boyfriend of Piedad and priest, real father of Leopoldo
- Jorge Luis Pila as Salvador Rivera, in love with Tatiana, married Raquel, then Tatiana
- Rosalinda Rodríguez as Hilda de Hidalgo
- Flor Elena González as Piedad de Riquelme
- Claudia Reyes as Manon Álvarez
- Grettel Trujillo as Mariela, ends up in jail
- Griselda Noguera as Teresa
- Shirley Budge as Scarlet, in love with Leopoldo
- Carla Rodríguez as Lolita, ends up in jail
- Mariana Huerdo as Angelita
- Ivelín Giro as Jessica, in love with Leopoldo, dies frozen
- Eduardo Ibarrola as Julio Hidalgo
- José Antonio Coro as Felipe
- William Colmenares as Hugo, associated with Miroslava and Samuel
- Carlos Miguel Caballero as Juan Ignacio Riquelme, Samuel's son, wants to kill him, killed by Julio to save Valeria
- Julián Gil as Daniel Ferrari, villain, but then good, dies of cancer
- Liana Iniesta as Tatiana Riquelme, daughter of Samuel and Estrella
- Ximena Duque as Ana Lucía Hidalgo, Valeria's sister, in love with Isidro, has a baby with Isidro
- Christian Carabias as Tony Carvajal, dies frozen with Jessica
- Robert Avellanet as Guillermo "Iguana" Tovar
- Alberto Quintero as Isidro Morales
- Eric Sant as Alex Hidalgo, brother of Valeria Killed by Juan Ignacio
- Dayana Garroz as Raquel
- Alba Galindo as Nancy Mistral
- Ivonne Montero as María Inmaculada/Coral, Valeria's cousin, in love with Leopoldo, hates Julio, Valeria and Hilda, killed by rapist, strangled
- Nury Flores as Hipólita

== Broadcasters ==
Croatia	Valeria	Doma TV	July 12, 2011	November 9, 2011	Monday to Friday	
Romania	Valeria	Acasă TV	June 15, 2009	October 18, 2009	Monday to Friday	
Venezuela	Valeria	Venevisión	July, 2009	February 3, 2010	Monday to Friday	
Croatia	Valeria	Doma TV	November 5, 2012		Monday to Friday	
Uruguay	Valeria	VTV	December 15, 2013	Present	Monday to Friday	05:00 am
Paraguay	Valeria	Unicanal	January 5, 2015	Present	Monday to Friday	10:00 am

== See also ==
- List of films and television shows set in Miami
- List of programs broadcast by Venevisión
