= La heredera (Venezuelan TV series) =

- Genre: Telenovela
- Created by: Delia Fiallo
- Directed by: Daniel Farías
- Starring: Hilda Carrero; Eduardo Serrano
- Opening theme: Ámame by Marlene
- Ending theme: Ámame by Marlene
- Country of origin: Venezuela
- Original language: Spanish
- No. of episodes: 58

Production
- Executive producer: Tabaré Pérez
- Production company: Venevisión

Original release
- Network: Venevisión
- Release: 1982 – 1982

Related
- Adorable Mónica (1990); Milagros (2000)

La heredera is a 1982 Venezuelan telenovela created by Delia Fiallo and transmitted on Venevisión. Hilda Carrero and Eduardo Serrano starred as the main protagonists. The theme song for the telenovela was Ámame by Marlene.

== Plot ==
Cristina is a young woman who moves to the city away from her remote village searching for a better life. Reaching the city, she meets a woman named Belinda and learns the art of puppetry. One day, while doing a show at a Children's Hospital, she meets a young doctor called Julián Infante who is attracted by Cristina's charming personality and intelligence, but he notices that she has a limp. Julián offers to help her cure the lameness. Later, Cristina discovers she is the daughter of Exequiel Zambrano, a rich man who fell in love with her poor mother a long time ago. Before his death, Ezequiel asks his lawyer to look for his missing daughter and give her an inheritance. Cristina is found and goes to live in the Zambrano household where she meets her new family. Luisa, her aunt, and her half-sister will torment her and add to her sufferings. Cristina will also meet Alfredo Méndez, the administrator of the Zambrano fortune who will conspire with her evil aunt to steal her inheritance. But what Cristina doesn't know is that Alfredo is hiding a secret from the past and is filled with a desire for revenge against the Zambrano family

== Cast ==
- Hilda Carrero- Cristina Zambrano
- Eduardo Serrano - Alfredo Infante
- Diego Acuña
- Gisvel Ascanio
- Estelín Betancor
- Eva Blanco
- Marita Capote
- Olga Castillo
- Helianta Cruz
- Guillermo Dávila
- Renee de Pallas
- Chela D'Gar
- Mariluz Díaz
- Miguel David Díaz
- Manuel Escolano
- Fernando Flores
- Mauricio González
- Dennys Hernández
- Yolanda Méndez
- Esther Orjuela
- Francia Ortiz
