= María del Mar (TV series) =

- Genre: Telenovela
- Created by: Delia Fiallo
- Directed by: Daniel Farias
- Starring: Chelo Rodríguez; Arnaldo André; Herminia Martínez; Hilda Carrero; Martín Lantigua
- Country of origin: Venezuela
- Original language: Spanish

Production
- Executive producer: Gustavo Rosario
- Production company: Venevisión

Original release
- Network: Venevisión
- Release: February 20 – September 6, 1978

Related
- Ana María; Daniela; Mar de amor (2009)

María del Mar is a Venezuelan telenovela produced by Venevisión in 1978. An original story by veteran telenovela writer Delia Fiallo, it starred Chelo Rodríguez and Arnaldo André as the main protagonists with Hilda Carrero and Martín Lantigua as the antagonists.

== Plot ==
In a village along the coast of Venezuela lives Maria Celeste, a girl with big dreams who is very cheerful and rebellious. She has been raised up by a kind family of fishermen, since she is the product of a rape, and her mother went mad after her delivery. during one summer, the mighty Leonidas Parras Montiel returns to town with his daughters, the selfish engineer Walkiria and the shy Zulay. Also, another person returns to the village: engineer Victor Manuel Galindez, a handsome man who hides a tortuous past. After spending time with each other, Maria Celeste falls in love with Victor Manuel.

Leonidas wants to build a hotel and entrusts the project to Walkiria and Victor Manuel. Immediately they fall in love, but he is fascinated with Maria Celeste. Leonidas also falls in love with the humble girl and wants to make her his wife. But everything will change when Victor Manuel rescues a beautiful and strange woman from the sea, a woman that the villagers believe is a mermaid. In reality, she is Miriam, a woman who went insane after Leonidas and his family financially destroyed and burned her property, causing the death of her parents and her husband. Victor Manuel dedicates his time in helping this woman, and this causes Maria Celeste to become jealous. Again, a prestigious publisher named Daniel comes into town, and is marvelled at the exotic beauty of Maria Celeste. He offers to take her to the city to make her a model. She agrees and goes with him, adopting the stage name of Maria del Mar. In the city, Maria will fall in love and triumph in the capital, until she becomes paralyzed through an unfortunate accident.

== Cast ==
- Chelo Rodríguez as María Celeste/María del Mar
- Arnaldo André as Víctor Manuel Galíndez
- Hilda Carrero as Walkiria Parra Montiel
- Herminia Martínez as María y Miriam"
- Betty Ruth as Casilda
- Martín Lantigua as Leónidas Parra Montiel
- Raúl Xiqués as Guillermo
- Elluz Peraza as Liduvina
- Flor Núñez as Inocencia
- Franklin Virgüez as Sargento Santos
- José Luis Silva as El Mojarras
- Elena Farias as Sulay Parra Montiel
- Héctor Myerston as Daniel
- Ángel Acosta as Salvador
- Angie as Federica Martínez
- Hermelinda Alvarado
- Haydée Balza as Mercedes Alcalá
- Chela d Gar as Mística
- Alma Ingianni as Lucrecia
- Mirtha Pérez as Maruja
- Chumico Romero
- Omar Omaña as Doctor Leonardo
- Luis Augusto Romero as Tilico
- Carmencita Padrón as Ramona
- Yalitza Hernández as Abril

== Versions ==
- Mar de amor : a Mexican telenovela produced by Televisa in 2009 starring Zuria Vega and Mario Cimarro.
