= Paraíso (Venezuelan TV series) =

- Genre: Telenovela; Drama
- Directed by: Marcos Reyes Andrade; Arquímedes Rivero
- Starring: Amanda Gutierrez; Víctor Cámara; Belen Marrero; Mariano Álvarez
- Opening theme: "Mi Vida es un Absurdo" by Eros Ramazzotti
- Country of origin: Venezuela
- Original language: Spanish
- No. of episodes: 160

Production
- Production company: Venevisión

Original release
- Network: Venevisión
- Release: 1989 – 1990

Paraíso is a Venezuelan telenovela produced and broadcast in 1989 by Venevisión. The novela was written by Vivel Novel and starred Amanda Gutiérrez and Víctor Cámara as the main protagonists with Belén Marrero and Mariano Alvarez as the main antagonists.

== Cast ==
- Amanda Gutiérrez as Eva Julieta
- Víctor Cámara as Adrian Arturo
- Belen Marrero as Fedora
- Carlos Arreaza as Piraña
- Janín Barboza
- Mirella Larotonda as Tane
- Mariano Álvarez
