= Esperanza Magaz =

Cuban-born Venezuelan television actress

- Born: Lidia Esperanza Magaz Jaime; February 24, 1922; Havana, Cuba
- Died: May 6, 2013 (aged 91); Caracas, Venezuela
- Occupation: Television actress
- Years active: 1953–2012
- Employer(s): RCTV; Venevisión

Lidia Esperanza Magaz Jaime (February 24, 1922 – May 6, 2013) was a telenovela television actress. She played under the name of Esperanza Magaz.

Born in Havana, Cuba, Magaz relocated to Caracas, Venezuela, in 1953. She ended up as a well-recognized supporting character actress, primarily on RCTV and Venevisión, while playing a variety of assorted supporting roles in dozens of telenovelas between the 1960s and the early 2012s.

She died in Caracas, Venezuela from Hodgkin's lymphoma at the age of 92.

== Selected roles ==
- Amantes
- El Desafío
- Doña Bárbara
- Esmeralda
- La Inolvidable
- La Revancha
- Kassandra
- La Zulianita
- Natalia del Mar
- Rafaela
- Toda una dama

== Sources ==
- Esperanza Magaz at IMDb
- Televen – Falleció la primera actriz Esperanza Magaz (Spanish)
- Últimas Noticias – Murió la primera actriz Esperanza Magaz (Spanish)
