= Bellísima =

- Genre: Telenovela; Romance; Drama
- Created by: Alicia Barrios
- Written by: Henry Herrera; Valentina Parraga; Daniel Álvarez
- Directed by: Marcos Reyes Andrade; Arquimedes Rivero
- Starring: Emma Rabbe; Víctor Cámara; Belen Marrero; Daniel Alvarado; Henry Galue
- Opening theme: Amor Casual by Wilfrido Vargas
- Ending theme: Amor Casual by Wilfrido Vargas
- Country of origin: Venezuela
- Original language: Spanish
- No. of episodes: 187

Production
- Executive producer: Raul Fleites
- Cinematography: Juan de Freitas
- Running time: 41-44 minutes
- Production company: Venevisión

Original release
- Network: Venevisión
- Release: October 29, 1991 – August 24, 1992

Bellisima is a Venezuelan telenovela written by Alicia Barrios and broadcast on Venevisión in 1991 with a story set in the world of fashion. Emma Rabbe and Víctor Cámara starred as the main protagonists. The series lasted 187 episodes, and was distributed internationally by Venevisión International.

== Synopsis ==
Bellisima is set within the modeling industry, depicting its elegant, extravagant and sometimes frivolous world.

Ricardo Linares Rincon is the owner of a successful and exclusive modeling agency and a playboy with an easy-going personality. He suddenly meets Gabriella Gruber, an ambitious yet unassuming woman who has recently graduated from a Fashion Design school. Gabriela is ambitious and wants to succeed due to her talent rather than her beauty. The meeting between Ricardo and Gabriela will lead them down a path where an unknown past ties them together.

== Cast ==
- Emma Rabbe as Gabriela Gruber
- Víctor Cámara as Ricardo Linares
- Belén Marrero as Sara
- Daniel Alvarado as Arturo
- Elena Dinisio as Roxana
- Henry Galue as Aurelio
- Nancy Gonzalez as Consuelo
- Belen Marrero as Sara
- Carolina Muziotti as Estrella
- Jose Vieira as Zurdo
- Juan Iturbide as Federico
- Lucy Orta as Eva
- Susana Dujim as Susana
- Carolina Motta as Marisol
- Elizabeth Morales as Esther
- Juan Carlos Vivas as Beiby
- Asdrubal Blanco as Ruben
- Dulce Maria Pilonietta as Vanessa
- Belen Diaz as Elvira

== See also ==
- List of telenovelas of Venevisión
- List of programs broadcast by Venevision
