= Emilia (TV series) =

- Genre: Telenovela
- Created by: Delia Fiallo; Ana Mercedez Escamez
- Directed by: Daniel Farías
- Starring: Elluz Peraza; Eduardo Serrano; Hilda Carrero
- Opening theme: "Entrégate" by Pecos Canvas
- Country of origin: Venezuela
- Original language: Spanish
- No. of episodes: 250

Production
- Executive producer: Tabaré Perez
- Production location: Caracas
- Running time: 41-44 minutes
- Production company: Venevisión

Original release
- Network: Venevisión
- Release: 27 November 1979 – 12 June 1980

Related
- María Emilia: Querida (1999); Todavía te amo (2027)

Emilia is a Venezuelan telenovela written by Delia Fiallo and produced by Venevisión which aired it between 1979 and 1980.

Elluz Peraza and Eduardo Serrano starred as the main protagonists.

== Plot ==
Emilia is a young middle-class seamstress who is struggling to work hard in order to support her grandmother, her sister Nereida and her brother Chente. Emilia's family lost their vast fortune, but despite the fact that they are struggling to make ends meet, they cannot resign themselves to accept poverty, as they dream of regaining their former wealth. In the same neighborhood lives Tano, a young man who is in love with Emilia, though Emilia only views him as a friend.

Each member of her family has their own path. Her grandmother lives in a fantasy world, Chente enters the criminal world while Nereida becomes the mistress to a rich, old man called Pipo who is married to Yolanda Aguirre. It turns out that Nereida's older lover is the father of Emilia's boyfriend, Alejandro. Alejandro is a playboy who is committed to marry Marcia, a selfish and capricious woman who will try to separate him from Emilia after Alejandro leaves her in order to marry Emilia.

However, Alejandro later discovers that his father is having an affair with a younger woman, and all the evidence points to Emilia. Emilia tries to defend herself, but Alejandro does not believe her, and he breaks off their engagement. One night, drunk and angry, Alejandro comes to Emilia's house and rapes her, only to discover that she was actually a virgin. Humiliated, traumatized and left expecting a child, Emilia decides to forget Alejandro, and she will meet Dr. Maselli, her new love interest.

== Cast ==
- Elluz Peraza as Emilia
- Eduardo Serrano as Alejandro Aguirre
- Eva Blanco as Yoli de Aguirre
- Mario Brito
- Martha Carbillo
- Hilda Carrero as Nereida
- Olga Castillo as Generosa
- Luis Colmenares as Mentepollo
- Helianta Cruz as Marcia
- Renee de Pallas as Abuela
- Elisa Escámez
- Elba Escobar as Elba
- Manuel Escolano
- Fernando Flores as Fernando
- Félix Loreto as Miguelón
- Alberto Marín as Pipo
- Yolanda Méndez
- Flor Núñez as Leticia
- Miriam Ochoa as Laurita
- Carmencita Padrón as Nina
- Tony Rodríguez as Chente
- Marcelo Romo as Dr Maselli
- Betty Ruth as Ines
- Franklin Virgüez as Tano
