= Vidas prestadas =

- Genre: Telenovela
- Created by: Alfonso Pareja
- Directed by: Aldo Salvini; Luis Barrios
- Starring: Grecia Colmenares; Luis José Santander; Sonia Oquendo
- Opening theme: Inolvidable by Jose Miguel Diez
- Country of origin: Peru
- Original language: Spanish
- No. of episodes: 120

Production
- Executive producer: Margarita Morales Macedo
- Cinematography: Fernando Vega
- Editor: Segundo Rivera

Original release
- Network: Venevisión

Vidas prestadas is a 2000 telenovela produced by Iguana Producciones. The telenovela is Peruvian was written by Alfonso Pareja. Grecia Colmenares, Luis José Santander, Sonia Oquendo, Carlos Tuccio and Jesús Delaveaux starred in the telenovela.

== Plot ==
This is the story of two people brought together by fate. Fernanda suffers on the day of her wedding when her fiancé abandons her at the altar. Heartbroken, she becomes cold and distant and begins to mistrust men, though she doesn't know of her mother's involvement in paying off her fiancé Fabián not to marry her. On the other hand, José María 'Chema' Rivero lives in Paraguay when he gets into trouble with the law. He seeks help from his friend Marcos who along with his mother is leaving the country for Peru and they decide to take Chema with them. However, their plane crashes and Chema is the only survivor. Due to a confusion, Chema is mistaken to be Marcos, and he decides to use the opportunity and keep using his dead friend's identity from now on. Chema will discover he has two cousins, Renato and Fernanda. One will become his worst enemy while the other will become his greatest love.

== Cast ==
- Grecia Colmenares as Fernanda Valente López
- Luis José Santander as José María 'Chema' Rivero
- Sonia Oquendo as Joanna López de Valente
- Carlos Tuccio as Édgar Valente
- Jesús Delaveaux as Federico Galindo
- Toño Vega as Ramón 'Moncho' Vidales Gringas
- María Pía Ureta as Diana Virgil
- Vanessa Terkes as Kathy Vigas
- Karina Calmet as Elisa Galindo
- Bernie Paz as Renato 'Renny' Valente López
- Ernesto González Quattrini as Antonio 'Tony' Ortega
- Cécica Bernasconi as Becky Lipton
- María José Zaldívar as Felicia Sánchez Viscero
- Carlos Carlín as Mauricio Virgil
- Baldomero Cáceres as Gary
- Mónica Sáenz as Ángela Ruiz
- Janet Murazzi as Irma
- Silvestre Ramos as Néstor Gardenia
- Javier Echevarría Escribens as Marcos Quiroga
- Patricia Frayssinet as Graciela Quiroga
- Marcelo Oxenford as Óscar Salinas
- Karlos Granada as Lorenzo
- Júlio Andrade as Adrián González Chávez
- Gabriel Calvo as Germán Viterio
- Antonio Dulzaides as Michael Gouber
- Diego La Hoz as Carlos
- Maryloly López as Nurse
- Elsa Olivero as Raquel Iturbe
- Paul Vega as Fabián Montero
