= Calypso (TV series) =

- Genre: Telenovela; Romance; Drama
- Created by: César Miguel Rondón; Luis Alberto Lamata
- Written by: Vivel Nouel; Doris Seguí; Angie Caperes; Rosa Clemente
- Directed by: Luis Alberto Lamata; Alicia Ávila
- Starring: Chiquinquirá Delgado; Luis Fernández; Alberto Alifa
- Opening theme: El poder de tu amor by Ricardo Montaner
- Ending theme: Sirena by Enrique Iglesias
- Country of origin: Venezuela
- Original language: Spanish
- No. of episodes: 80

Production
- Executive producer: Gustavo Rosario
- Running time: 41-44 minutes
- Production company: Venevisión

Original release
- Network: Venevisión
- Release: March 18 – December 1, 1999

Related
- La mujer de mi vida; María Rosa, búscame una esposa

Calypso is a Venezuelan telenovela created by César Miguel Rondón and produced by Venevisión in 1999. This telenovela lasted 80 episodes and was distributed internationally by Venevisión International.

Chiquinquirá Delgado and Luis Fernández star as the protagonists.

== Synopsis ==
Calypso is a picturesque and prosperous Caribbean island that, on the day of San Salvador - patron saint of the island, crowns the queen of the festivities, who this year is a woman named Maria Margarita, “la Bella” (“the Beautiful”). She is referred to as such due to her described beauty as well as to differentiate her from her older sister, who is seen as equally beautiful and shares a similar name; Margarita Luisa, “la Grande” (“the Elder”).

However, neither of the two Margaritas feel like celebrating. "La Grande" is still in mourning, since exactly one year ago the sea took the life of Ernesto Lopez, the man she was going to marry. "La Bella" is saddened because she says goodbye to Mariano Gonzalez, a modest teacher who has won her heart and is now leaving the island to never return. "La Grande" runs to the seashore in an attempt to feel closer to the man she desperately misses. There, she sees the waves carrying a man's body toward the shore. "La Grande" dives in and pulls the man out of the sea to bring him to safety. He is Simon Vargas, who will be known on the island as “the Castaway”, who regains consciousness in the arms of whom he confuses with as an angel.

A relationship develops between them as of that instant. "La Grande" feels that the prophecy of La Maga, her friend and protector, is coming true: “When the sea takes a love, it always gives back a bigger, deeper one”, but who knows if that new love will end up being destined for her sister, "la Bella"? Inevitably, Margarita "la Bella" also falls under the spell of "the Castaway’s" sensuality, tenderness and joie de vivre. That marks the beginning of a bitter war between the two Margaritas over "the Castaway’s" love - a war that will become legend on Calypso and on many other islands in the Caribbean.

== Cast ==
- Chiquinquirá Delgado as Margarita Luisa Volcan - La Grande
- Luis Fernandez as Simon Vargas - El Naufrago Perez
- Flor Nuñez as Otilia Gades
- Alberto Alifa as Ernesto Lopez Larazabal / Eduardo Lopez Larazabal
- Karl Hoffman as Jacinto Lara
- Felix Loreto as Wenceslao Lugones
- Eileen Abad as Yolanda Pujol de Martinez
- Juan Manuel Laguardia as Francisco "el caco" Aguirre
- Marian Valero as Helena Mendoza
- Beatriz Vasquez as Manuela Rojo
- Marcos Moreno as Capitan Jacobo Carmona
- Zoe Bolivar as Dionisia
- Javier Paredes as Cabo Flores
- Rolando Padilla as Padre Braulio
- Yvan Romero as Plinio
- Daniel Garcia as Rafael Manrique
- Mirtha Pérez as La Maga
- Jose Oliva as Lorenzo Volcan
- Johanna Morales as Maria Margarita Volcan - La Bella
- Aileen Celeste as Clara Rosa
- Giovanni Reali as Pablo Gamboa
- Laura Altieri as Laura de Gamboa
- Jose Luis Zuleta as Canelon
- Ralph Kinnard as Klaus
- Aniuska Lopez as Mileydis
- Ronny Martinez as Catire
- Maria Luisa Lamata as Tia Cecilia
