= Las amazonas (Venezuelan TV series) =

1985 Venezuelan television drama series

- Genre: Telenovela; Drama
- Created by: César Miguel Rondón
- Directed by: Grazio D'Angelo
- Starring: Hilda Carrero; Eduardo Serrano; Alba Roversi; Corina Azopardo; Miriam Ochoa
- Opening theme: Sola by Jorge Rigo
- Country of origin: Venezuela
- Original language: Spanish
- No. of episodes: 105

Production
- Executive producer: Carlos Suárez Melero
- Production location: Yaracuy
- Cinematography: Ramon Mendoza
- Production company: Venevisión

Original release
- Network: Venevisión
- Release: April 30 – October 11, 1985

Related
- Quirpa de tres mujeres (1996); Niña amada mía (2003); Las bandidas (2013); Las amazonas (2016)

Las amazonas is a Venezuelan telenovela written by César Miguel Rondón and produced by Venevisión in 1985. This series lasted for 105 episodes and was distributed internationally by Venevisión International.

Hilda Carrero and Eduardo Serrano starred as the main protagonists with Miriam Ochoa as the antagonist.

== Synopsis ==
Emiro Lizárraga is an ambitious, proud owner of a horse ranch called Amazonas. Emiro obtained his fortune through illegal means, and he has three daughters Isabel, Carolina and Eloísa while also having recently married his secretary Elvira, a flirtatious, calculating and ambitious woman. The girls do not get along well with their father's new wife, leading to conflicts. Isabel, the eldest daughter, becomes attracted to Rodrigo, a young veterinarian who is divorced and has two daughters. Carolina has a sweet, docile nature while the last of the girls, Eloísa, who has recently graduated from a school in the United States, is the most liberal of them all. At the ranch, she falls in love with Dario who dreams of becoming a jockey. These three girls have been raised up by Ines, and she supports them against their father's plans of marrying them off in convenient marriages. But the girls will not follow their father's wishes, and find their own happiness on their own terms.

== Cast ==
- Hilda Carrero as Isabel Lizárraga Aranguren
- Eduardo Serrano as Rodrigo Izaguirre Campos
- Alba Roversi as Eloísa Lizárraga Aranguren
- Corina Azopardo as Carolina Lizárraga Aranguren
- Miriam Ochoa as Elvira Castillas De Lizárraga
- Manuel Escolano as Carmelo Fábrega
- Tony Rodriguez as Darío Landa
- Santy as Fernando
- Eva Blanco as Inés Landa
- Julio Alcázar as Francisco Urdaneta
- José Oliva as Emiro Lizárraga Sorté
- Fernando Flores as Pascual Torres Mendoza
- Pedro Marthán as Oscar Alvarado
- Reneé de Pallás as Doña Delia
- Betty Ruth as Ramona
  - Laura Termini Lalita Izaguirre
- Chela D'Gar as Trina
- Esther Orjuela as Esperanza Moreno
- Angélica Arenas as Jeanette Ibarra
- Juan Manuel Montesinos as Raúl Moretti
- Flor Núñez as Consuelo
- Henry Galué as Inspector Lander
- Gerardo Marrero as Dimas Peña
- Jeannette Lehr as Ágatha
- Emilia Rojas as Irama
- Chumico Romero as Antonio
- Luis A. Romero as Nap
- Ernesto Balzi as Roberto
- Mariela Capriles as Amelia
- Jose L. Vargas as Varguitas
- Alexandra Rodríguez as Jimena
- Hermelinda Alvarado as Sra. Cheragusia
- German Regalado as Veloz
