= La mujer prohibida (1972 TV series) =

Venezuelan telenovela

- Genre: Telenovela
- Created by: Manuel Muñoz Rico
- Written by: Manuel Muñoz Rico; José Piñera
- Directed by: José Antonio Ferrara
- Starring: Ada Riera; Martín Lantigua; Humberto García; Amelia Roman
- Opening theme: Háblame Suavemente by Rudy Márquez
- Country of origin: Venezuela
- Original language: Spanish

Production
- Production location: Pueblo San Pedro del Orinoco
- Production company: Venevisión

Original release
- Network: Venevisión
- Release: June 18, 1972 – March 31, 1973

Related
- María Teresa; La Loba; La mujer prohibida (1991)

La mujer prohibida is a Venezuelan telenovela created by Argentine writer Manuel Muñoz Rico and produced by Venevisión in 1972.

Ada Riera, Martín Lantigua and Humberto García starred as the protagonists with Amelia Roman as the main antagonist.

== Cast ==
- Ada Riera as Virginia Galvan
- Martín Lantigua as Marcos Villena
- Humberto García as Cristian Villena
- Amelia Roman as La Waica
- Jose Torres as Juancho
- Haydée Balza as Yajaira
- Jesús Maella as Hilario Galvan
- Mary Soliani as Chimbela
- Martha Lancaste as La Chepa
- Concha Rosales as Pilar Martínez
- Ingrid Gil as Lupita
- Hector Cabrera as Padre Damasco
- Norah Zurita as Gisela
- Tito Bonilla as Yaco
- Octavio Diaz as Augusto Casas
- Heriberto Escalona as Eduardo Salinas
