= La sombra de Piera =

- Genre: Telenovela; Drama
- Written by: Ligia Lezama
- Starring: Elluz Peraza; Eduardo Serrano; Manuel Escolano
- Opening theme: "Otra noche contigo" by Melissa
- Country of origin: Venezuela
- Original language: Spanish
- No. of episodes: 100

Original release
- Network: Venevisión
- Release: 1989 – 1990

La Sombra de Piera is a Venezuelan telenovela broadcast between 1989 and 1990 on Venevisión. Elluz Peraza (playing a dual role of twins) and Eduardo Serrano starred as the main protagonists with the participation of Manuel Escolano, Martín Lantigua, Chony Fuentes and Zoe Ducos.

== Plot ==
Piera Cariani is married to Jonathan but their marriage is affected due to her husband's interest in her father's fortune. In a fit of jealousy, Jonathan kills Piera. When Don Giacomo Cariani notices her absence from the household, Jonathan lies that she is travelling abroad. To avoid suspicion, Jonathan and her grandmother Francesca resolve to find Piera's twin sister Yamalí who is unknown to the rest of the family and has been living in the Amazon jungle for years.

Meanwhile, Yamalí find herself at a crossroads as she is forced to leave the love of her life Sebastián in order to go to Caracas and take her sister's place without knowing she is going into a trap where she will be constantly harassed by Jonathan and Francesca. Later, she finally uncovers their schemes and big plan to steal the fortune of Don Giacomo who is ill and in a wheel chair.

is at a difficult crossroads as it should let your love Sebastian ( Eduardo Serrano ) to go to Caracas to supplant Piera, not knowing that it would be heavily harassed by Jonathan and Francesca, and she ends up discovering the plot armed to seize the fortune of Don Giacomo, who is ill and in a wheelchair. While thinking Yamalí is dead, Sebastián decides to move to the capital city to rebuild his life and once again meets Yamalí who is now impersonating Piera and he falls in love with her again.

== Cast ==
- Elluz Peraza as Piera Cariani/Yamalí
- Eduardo Serrano as Sebastián
- Manuel Escolano as Jonathan
- Chony Fuentes
- Veronica Cortez
- Zoe Ducos as Francesca
- Martín Lantigua as Giacomo Cariani
