= Amor mío (Venezuelan TV series) =

- Created by: Isamar Hernández; Tabare Perez
- Written by: Ricardo Garcia; Manuel Manzano; Isamar Hernández
- Directed by: Claudio Callao
- Starring: Astrid Gruber; Julio Pereira; Félix Loreto; Gabriel Fernández
- Theme music composer: Frank Aguilar
- Opening theme: "Amor Mío, Si Tú Fueras Mío" by Viviana Gibelli
- Ending theme: "Amor Mío, Si Tú Fueras Mío" by Viviana Gibelli
- Country of origin: Venezuela
- Original language: Spanish
- No. of episodes: 130

Production
- Producer: Mariana Djuro
- Production location: Caracas
- Cinematography: Carlos A. Sánchez
- Editor: Carlos Alvarez
- Running time: 45 minutes

Original release
- Network: Venevisión
- Release: July 30 – November 7, 1997

Amor mío is a 1997 Venezuelan telenovela that was seen and broadcast on Venevisión. The telenovela was written by Isamar Hernández and Tabare Perez. Astrid Gruber and Julio Pereira starred as the main protagonists.

== Cast ==
- Astrid Gruber as Amada Briceño / Veronica
- Julio Pereira as Luis Fernando Alcantara
- Félix Loreto as Mariano Fonseca
- Gabriel Fernández as Ricardo Sifuentes
- Nury Flores as Doña Enriqueta Alcantara
- Isabel Moreno as Carmen de Briceño
- Haydee Balza as Amalia de Sifuentes
- Mirtha Borges as Mercedes
- Judith Vasquez
- Juan Frankis as Juan
- Eliseo Perera as Felipe
- Bettina Grand as Ligia Sifuentes
- Elena Dinisio as Leticia Alcantara
- Roberto Colmenares
- Carlos Omaña as Vicente Briceño
- Aura Rivas as Chichita
- Marco A. Casanova as Andres Fonseca
- Winda Pierralt
- Asdrubal Blanco
