= Amor de Abril =

- Genre: Telenovela
- Written by: Édgar Mejías
- Directed by: Carlos Suárez
- Starring: Aixa Moreno; Eduardo Serrano; Rafael Briceño; Liliana Durán
- Country of origin: Venezuela
- Original language: Spanish
- No. of episodes: 130

Original release
- Network: Venevisión
- Release: 1988

Amor de Abril is a 1988 Venezuelan telenovela developed by Édgar Mejías for Venevisión. The telenovela was distributed internationally by Venevisión International and starred Aixa Moreno and Eduardo Serrano as the main protagonists.

== Plot ==
Amor de Abril tells the story of Abril Santaella who faces her past after meeting Gilberto Russian, the re encounter with her family, her powerful father Nicolas Santaella and the thing she had given up on: love. The story takes place in the environment of journalism, financial world while involving three families: the Santaellas, Anduezas and Duartes. Leonardo Duarte is responsible for a tragedy in which Abril is involved. But is the question becomes what is Leonardo's connection with the Santaella family before he met Abril? What is his purpose? And will Abril be able to give up the love of her life because he hates her family? Who will win when love and hate are involved?.

== Cast ==
- Aixa Moreno as Abril Santaella
- Eduardo Serrano as Leonardo Duarte
- Rafael Briceño as Nicolás Santaella
- Liliana Durán
- Eva Moreno
- Mirella Larotonda
- Luis Gerardo Núñez
- Luis Gerónimo Abreu
- Martha Pabón
- Alejo Felipe
- Hector Monteverde
- Sandra Bruzon
