= Alba Marina =

- Genre: Telenovela
- Created by: Mariela Romero
- Directed by: Carlos Suárez
- Starring: Karina; Xavier Serbia; Elluz Peraza; Daniel Alvarado; Proyecto M
- Opening theme: Sin Máscara by Karina and Tiempo de Amarnos by Proyecto M
- Country of origin: Venezuela
- Original language: Spanish
- No. of episodes: 102

Production
- Production company: Venevisión

Original release
- Network: Venevisión
- Release: June 1988 – November 1988

Related
- Enamorada

Alba Marina is a 1988 telenovela produced by Venevisión. The telenovela was written by Mariela Romero and stars Karina and Xavier Serbiá (formerly of Menudo and by then of Proyecto M) as the main protagonists.

== Plot ==
Nelson Hurtado and Mercedes have a baby girl whom they name Alba Marina. However, Mercedes falls in with another man and leaves alone for Europe leaving her daughter behind.

Father and daughter will live, separately, the most fascinating adventures until, united by destiny, they find the happiness they had never achieved....

== Cast ==
- Karina as Alba Marina Marcano
- Xavier Serbia
- Daniel Alvarado as Nelson Hurtado
- Elluz Peraza
- René Farrait
- Maria Elena Heredia
- Diana Juda
- Johnny Lozada
- Verónica Ortiz
