= Quirpa de tres mujeres =

- Genre: Telenovela; Romance; Drama
- Created by: César Miguel Rondón
- Written by: Ricardo García; Luis Zelkowiez; Gabriela Dominguez; Elizabeth Alezard
- Directed by: Claudio Callao
- Starring: Fedra López; Danilo Santos; Gabriela Spanic; Mónica Rubio; Julio Alcázar
- Opening theme: La Alazana (Si Bebieras de Mi Amor) by Viviana Gibelli
- Country of origin: Venezuela
- Original language: Spanish
- No. of episodes: 107

Production
- Executive producer: Alicia Ávila
- Producer: Laura Rodriguez
- Cinematography: Anita Aguerrevere
- Running time: 41-44 minutes
- Production company: Venevisión

Original release
- Network: Venevisión
- Release: February 8 – July 14, 1996

Related
- Las amazonas (1985); Niña amada mía (2003); Las bandidas (2013); Las amazonas (2016)

Quirpa de tres mujeres (Quirpa of three women) is a Venezuelan telenovela produced by Venevisión in 1996, based on the series Las Amazonas written by César Miguel Rondón in 1985.

Fedra López and Danilo Santos starred as the main protagonists accompanied by Gabriela Spanic, Mónica Rubio, Juan Carlos Vivas as co-protagonists, while Julio Alcázar and Milena Santander starred as antagonists.

== Plot ==
Gonzalo Landaeta was a rich landowner who suffered a betrayal from Vicente Echeverría who stole his land and his wife thereby making him die in sorrow. His three daughters Manuela, Emiliana and Camila, are filled with a strong passion that Vicente, who has raised them with a firm hand, will ensure that it ends.

Manuela is to be married to Ezequiel, but she begins to have a change of heart when she meets Rodrigo, a man whose tenderness and passion causes her deep confusion. Emiliana is torn between the love of a man and respect for her father when she falls in love with Juan Cristobal Landeata, an older man who is her father's worst enemy. Camila goes to defy her father by falling in love with Dario, her childhood playmate whom Vicente views as a simple peasant unworthy of his daughter's affections

== Cast ==
- Fedra López as Manuela Echeverría Castañón
- Danilo Santos as Rodrigo Uzcátegui Calderón
- Julio Alcázar as Don Vicente Echeverría Olmos
- Daniel Lugo as Juan Cristóbal Landaeta
- Gabriela Spanic as Emiliana Echeverría Castañón
- Mónica Rubio as Camila Echeverría Castañón
- Juan Carlos Vivas as Darío Guanipa
- Cristina Reyes as Betania Rangel
- Henry Galué as Ezequiel Erellano
- Milena Santander as Eva (Evangelina) Azcárraga de Echeverría
- Carlos Antonio León as Manny
- Ivette Domínguez as Tibisay
- Sofía Díaz as Daniela Uzcátegui
- Duly Garaterol as Isabela Uzcátegui
- José Rafael Giménez as Gabriel Erellano
- Ramón Hinojosa as Santos Ortiz
- Eva Moreno as Mercedes Landaeta
- Yolanda Muñoz as Plácida Guanipa
- Javier Paredes as José María Carasquel
- Elluz Peraza as Consuelo
- José Luis Zuleta as Lorenzo Real
