= Por amarte tanto =

- Genre: Telenovela; Romance; Drama
- Created by: Vivel Nouel
- Written by: Elizabeth Alezard; Gabriela Domínguez; Valentina Párraga; Luis Zelkowicz
- Directed by: José Antonio Ferrara; Arquímedes Rivero
- Starring: Jean Carlo Simancas; Viviana Gibelli; Javier Vidal; Carolina Cristancho; Raúl Amundaray
- Opening theme: "Por amarte tanto" performed by Guillermo Dávila
- Country of origin: Venezuela
- Original language: Spanish
- No. of episodes: 146

Production
- Executive producer: Aimara Escobar
- Production location: Caracas
- Production company: Venevisión

Original release
- Network: Venevisión
- Release: October 13, 1992 – July 12, 1993

Related
- Cara Sucia; Pobre Millonaria

Por amarte tanto (To love you more) is a Venezuelan telenovela written by Vivel Nouel and produced by Venevisión in 1993. This telenovela lasted 146 episodes and was distributed internationally by Venevisión International.

Viviana Gibelli and Jean Carlo Simancas starred as the main protagonists with Carolina Cristancho and Raúl Amundaray as the main antagonists.

== Plot ==
Laura Vasquez has never been happy. Heiress to billionaire Gregorio Velasquez, her fortune has only caused her pain. Noble and shy, she constantly searches for a love pure and sincere. Luciana, who lives in the Vasquez mansion, has raised Laura. She has tried to be a mother to Laura, but she has never been able to erase the memory of her beautiful and elegant mother, Amanda Vasquez. Gregorio Vasquez owns an advertising agency where Luis Arturo Ramirez works as an account executive. Luis Arturo is an attractive young man who is always looking for an easy way out. He seeks financial security through women and his dream is to find a rich, single and beautiful heiress. He meets Laura and, from that moment on, he decides to win her heart. He also meets Damiana, a woman without any scruples, who happens to be Laura's cousin. His passion for Damiana will drive him into a tempestuous love triangle.

== Cast ==
- Jean Carlo Simancas as Luis Arturo Ramírez
- Viviana Gibelli as Laura Velásquez
- Javier Vidal as Javier
- Carolina Cristancho as Damiana
- Raúl Amundaray as Gregorio Vasquez
- Francisco Ferrari as Piero Grisanti
- Juan Carlos Vivas as Honorio
