= Más que amor, frenesí (TV series) =

Television series

- Genre: Telenovela; Romance; Drama
- Created by: César Miguel Rondón; Mónica Montañés
- Directed by: Carlos Izquierdo
- Starring: Wanda D´ Isidoro; Mario Cimarro; Jean Carlos Simancas; Gigi Zancheta
- Opening theme: "Frenesi" by Oscar D'León
- Country of origin: Venezuela
- Original language: Spanish
- No. of episodes: 105

Production
- Executive producer: Dayan Coronado
- Production location: Caracas
- Running time: 41-44 minutes
- Production company: Venevisión

Original release
- Network: Venevisión
- Release: March 27 – August 24, 2001

Related
- Amantes de luna llena; Guerra de mujeres

Más que amor, frenesí ("More than Love... Frenzy") is a 2001 Venezuelan telenovela that was produced by and aired on Venevisión. It had a total of 105 episodes and was distributed internationally.

== Synopsis ==
Más que amor, frenesí tells the story of a variety characters living their day-to-day lives in the city of Caracas. The show features several romantic plotlines.

Cast

- Wanda D' Isidoro as Virginia Fajardo
- Mario Cimarro as Santiago Guerrero
- Jean Carlo Simancas as Orestes Lara
- Carolina Perpetuo as Mercedes Fajardo de Lopez
- Denise Novell as Consuelo "Chelo" Pacheco
- Gigi Zancheta as Hada Marina Fajardo de Pimentel
- Rafael Romero as Abelardo Pimentel
- Ana Karina Casanova as Carmela Crespo
- Yanis Chimaras as Pompeyo Lopez
- Raul Amundaray as Tadeo Guerrero
- Margarita Ortega as Maria Patricia Mendoza
- Isabel Moreno as Corazon
- Herminia Martinez as Perpetua de Fajardo
- Elizabeth Morales as Socorro Angulo
- Cristina Obin as La Gran Betancourt
- Martha Carbillo as Justina
- Jose Torres as Pio
- Pedro Lander as Marco Tulio Bracamonte
- Ramon Hinojosa as Tapia
- Rolando Padilla as Preston Echevarria
- Victor Rentroya as Norton
- Johanna Morales as Nubis Mayo
- Adelaida Mora as Belinda
- Reinaldo Jose Perez as Casto Manuel
- Maritza Bustamante as Maria Fernanda Lopez Fajardo
- Daniel Elbitar as Alberto Jose "Tito" Rodriguez Pacheco
- Deyalith Lopez as Jennifer
- Victor Hernandez as Serafín
- Candy Montesinos as Ana
- Cesar Roman Bolivar as Pablo
- Kimberly Dos Ramos as Anastasia "Taty" Lara Fajardo
- Lenin Dos Ramos as Rodrigo Pimentel Fajardo
- Cindy Carol Da Silva as Alejandra Pimentel Fajardo
- Jose Manuel Moreno Suarez as Fernando Jose "Nandito" Lopez Pacheco
- Rocio Bastidas as Rafaela
- Jenny Valdez as Xiolimar
- Mario Brito as Chicho
- Monica Pereda as Samira
- Frank Mendez as Camacaro
- Juan Galeno as Jacinto
- Maritza Adames as Lopez
- Jean Paul Leroux as Chacon
- Ana Massimo as Clarita
- Carmen Francia as Clemencia
- Asdrubal Blanco as Edisson
- Juan Frankis as Anselmo Lander/Carterito
- Vicente Tepedino as Teodoro
- Chony Fuentes as Pepita Pacheco

== See also ==
- List of famous telenovelas
- List of programs broadcast by Venevision
