= Peligrosa =

- Genre: Telenovela
- Created by: Vivel Nouel
- Written by: Vivel Nouel; Alberto Gómez; Elizabeth Allezard; Óscar Urdaneta; María Antonieta Gutierrez
- Directed by: Marcos Reyes Andrade
- Starring: Víctor Cámara; Rosalinda Serfaty; Emma Rabbe; Daniel Alvarado; Carlos Olivier; Elluz Peraza; Juan Carlos Vivas
- Opening theme: Lloró by Amílcar Boscán
- Ending theme: Lloró by Amílcar Boscán
- Country of origin: Venezuela
- Original language: Spanish
- No. of episodes: 164

Production
- Executive producer: Marisol Campos
- Producers: Sandra Rioboo; Arquímides Rivero
- Production location: Caracas
- Production company: Venevisión

Original release
- Network: Venevisión
- Release: 1994 – 1995

Related
- Morena Clara; Ka Ina

Peligrosa is a Venezuelan telenovela written by Vivel Nouel for Venevisión and broadcast between 1994 and 1995. The series lasted 164 episodes and was distributed internationally by Venevisión International.

Víctor Cámara, Rosalinda Serfaty and Emma Rabbe starred as the main protagonists.

== Synopsis ==
Luis Fernando is wealthy and used to getting his own way. After his best friend Ernesto takes one of his romantic partners, Luis Fernando seeks revenge and finds an opportunity in Elisa, a young woman who grew up in poverty in a violent neighborhood and supports herself through pickpocketing. When she attempts to rob him, he recognizes potential beneath her rough exterior and decides she could help him get back at Ernesto. He sets out to transform her into a refined, sophisticated woman, intending to use her to humiliate his friend and later expose her origins. As their plan progresses, Luis Fernando and Elisa develop genuine feelings for each other, leading to a complicated and turbulent relationship... one that will place them in many tragic, unexpected situations, until their story reaches a dramatic and utterly surprising conclusion.

== Cast ==
=== Main cast ===
- Víctor Cámara as Luis Fernando Amengual
- Rosalinda Serfaty as Elisa Camacho
- Emma Rabbe as Clementina Villegas
- Elizabeth Morales as Silvia Martínez / Jessica Lárez
- Juan Carlos Vivas as Padre Jesús Amengual
- Elluz Peraza as Ana
- Carlos Olivier as Arturo Ramírez

=== Supporting cast ===
- Eva Blanco as Chela Camacho
- Liliana Durán as Leandra de Amengual
- Agustina Martín
- Eva Mondolfi as Josefina de Villegas
- Laura Zerra
- Francisco Ferrari as Rigoberto
- Gonzalo Velutini as Ernesto París
- Perucho Conde as Coliseo "Corcho" Camacho
- Eliseo Perera as Padre Andrés
- Humberto Tancredi as Jacinto Villegas
- Regino Jiménez
- Javier Vidal
- Daniel Alvarado as Gavilan
- Denise Novell as La Gata
- Azabache as Manzura
- Ana Martínez as Angelina Villegas
- Carlos D'arco as León Ramírez
- Jeniffer Rodríguez as Bettina Villegas
