= Y la luna también =

- Genre: Telenovela; Romance; Drama
- Created by: César Miguel Rondón
- Written by: César Miguel Rondón; Napoleon Graziani; Isamar Hernandez
- Directed by: José Antonio Ferrara
- Starring: Amanda Gutiérrez; Carlos Augusto Cestero; Ruddy Rodríguez; Luis José Santander
- Opening theme: Una especie en extinción by Melissa
- Country of origin: Venezuela
- Original language: Spanish
- No. of episodes: 174

Production
- Executive producer: Valentina Parraga
- Production locations: Caracas, Venezuela
- Running time: 45 minutes
- Production company: Venevisión

Original release
- Network: Venevisión
- Release: August 1, 1987 – January 4, 1988

Y la luna también is a Venezuelan telenovela created by César Miguel Rondón and produced by Venevisión in 1987.

Amanda Gutiérrez and Carlos Augusto Cestero star as protagonists alongside Ruddy Rodríguez and Luis José Santander. Herminia Martínez, Yolanda Méndez and Fernando Flores star as antagonists.

== Plot ==
Lucía is an assistant working at a beauty parlor owned by Teresa Pastor, while Simón is a waiter in a modest restaurant, and they both become carried away in fantasy to live lives which do not belong to them as they both pretend to come from rich backgrounds. Elena, Lucía's older sister, begins working for the Azcárate Consortium where she meets and falls in love with Claudio Miranda, without knowing that he is engaged to Cherry Azcárate, the daughter of the company's owner.

== Cast ==
- Amanda Gutiérrez as Elena Anselmi
- Carlos Augusto Cestero as Claudio Miranda
- Daniel López as Tarado Armando
- Ruddy Rodríguez as Lucía Anselmi (Estefanía)
- Luis José Santander as Simón Vargas
- Eva Blanco as Teresa Pastor
- Herminia Martínez as Cherry Azcárate Melchan
- Fernando Flores as Ulises Azcárate
- José Oliva as Vitelio Vargas
- Yolanda Méndez as Federica Melchán de Azcárate
- Betty Ruth as Doña Leticia Anselmi
- Carlos Briceño as Ulises Jose Pepe Azcarate Melchan
- Ramón Hinojosa as Pompilio Gomez
- Ricardo Blanco as Dr. Emiliano Guzman
- Lucy Otra as Teotiste
- Gustavo Gonzalez as Don Urbano
- Esther Orjuela as Eugenia De Corona
- Zulma López as Kathy Azcarate Melchan
- Yadira Santana as Catalina Aguirre
- Laura Zerra as Doña Encarnacion
- Carlos Salas
