= Dulce Enemiga =

1995 Venezuelan telenovela

- Genre: Telenovela; Romance; Drama
- Created by: Valentina Párraga
- Directed by: Rafael Gómez; Arquímedes Rivero
- Starring: Gigi Zanchetta; Guillermo Dávila; Natalia Streignard
- Theme music composer: Guillermo Dávila
- Opening theme: Dulce Enemiga
- Country of origin: Venezuela
- Original language: Spanish
- No. of episodes: 153

Production
- Executive producer: Marisol Campos
- Producer: Sandra Rioboo
- Cinematography: Luis Monroy; Alfredo Tappan
- Production company: Venevisión

Original release
- Network: Venevisión
- Release: August 16, 1995 – March 5, 1996

Dulce Enemiga (English title:Sweet Enemy) is a Venezuelan telenovela written by Valentina Párraga and produced by Venevisión in 1995. This telenovela lasted 153 episodes and was distributed internationally by Venevisión International.

Gigi Zanchetta and Guillermo Dávila starred as the protagonists with Natalia Streignard as the antagonist.

== Synopsis ==
For the beautiful Victoria Andueza, love and hate will intermingle until she is no longer able to tell them apart as circumstances force her to become the fiercest enemy of the only man she's ever loved. While Victoria is away at school in Italy, her father becomes involved in dishonest dealings at the corporation that he manages. When one of his employees, Julio Cesar Guerrero, discovers that Mr. Andueza has been embezzling millions, he goes public with the information, and the ensuing scandal causes Mr. Andueza to suffer a fatal heart attack.

Victoria, who has just returned from Europe, happens to be with her father at the moment of his death. Completely ignorant of the facts of the situation, she is convinced that her father has been wronged. All she knows is that he died because of a dispute with a certain Julio Cesar Guerrero and she vows to seek revenge at any cost.

Victoria comes up with a simple plan: she will win Julio Cesar's love and confidence, become indispensable to him, discover his weak points, and then ruin his life and reputation, just as he ruined her father. To accomplish this, she is willing to go as far as marrying Julio Cesar under a false identity.

Armed with a complete set of fake documents to back up her new name, Victoria sets out to conquer Julio Cesar and manages to do so in record time. Soon he is hopelessly in love with her and planning for their wedding day. But Victoria's schemes backfire. After hurting Julio Cesar terribly, she realizes that the profound hate she feels for him is turning into an uncontrollable love...

Julio Cesar discovers Victoria's identity and is forced to tell her the story behind her father's death and disgrace... She realizes her mistake, but it's too late for forgiveness. Now it is Julio Cesar who wants revenge. In spite of their feelings, Victoria and Julio Cesar are destined to be enemies. Still, they experience painful moments before finally succumbing to the love that binds them.

== Cast ==
- Gigi Zancheta as Maria Victoria Andueza
- Guillermo Dávila as Julio Cesar Guerrero
- Raul Amundaray as Antonio Andueza
- Aroldo Betancourt as Armando Chano
- Adolfo Cubas as Ulises Romano
- Nury Flores as Moncha
- Jined Lamata as Marivi
- Carolina Lopez as Magali
- Eduardo Luna as Victor Manuel
- Belen Marrero as Minerva Cardoso
- Elizabeth Morales as Socorro Coco Palacios
- Cristina Obin as Lola
- Patricia Oliveros as Amarilis
- Yajaira Orta as Alma
- Jennifer Rodriguez as María Lucia Andueza
- Natalia Streignard as María Laura Andueza
- Rosita Vasquez as Natalia

peter parra el gavilan
