= Elluz Peraza =

Venezuelan pageant titleholder and actress

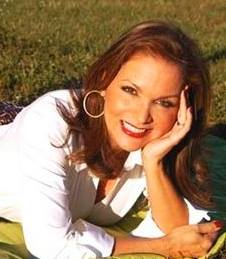
- Born: Elluz Coromoto Peraza González; January 26, 1958 (age 68); Caracas, Venezuela
- Height: 1.75 m (5 ft 9 in)
- Beauty pageant titleholder
- Years active: 1976-2013
- Hair color: Brown
- Eye color: Brown

Elluz Coromoto Peraza González (born January 26, 1958) (Elluz is pronounced E-lus) is a Venezuelan actress and beauty pageant winner who was crowned Miss Venezuela 1976. She resigned on May 24, 1976, because she married two days after her coronation.

== Early life ==
She was born in Caracas.

== Personal life ==
She married and divorced Jorge Martínez (2001–2002). She had previously married and outlived German Freites (1982–1984) with whom she had 1 child, and Nehomar Bruzual (1976–1980), with whom she has another child. She has one granddaughter (b. 2011) and one grandson (b. 2014).

== Telenovelas ==
- Rafaela (1977)
- Catatumbo (1980)
- María del Mar (1978)
- Emilia (1980)
- La Fruta Amarga (1981)
- Cenicienta (1981)
- El Pecado de una Madre (1982)
- Una Flor en el Fango
- Sueño Contigo (1987)
- Alba Marina (1988)
- La Sombra de Piera (1989)
- Pasionaria (1990)
- Mundo de Fieras (1991)
- Peligrosa (1994)
- Como tú, ninguna (1995)
- El Perdon de los Pecados (1996)
- Quirpa de Tres Mujeres (1996)
- La Mujer del Presidente (1997) Colombia
- El Amor es Mas Fuerte (1998) Colombia
- Carita Pintada (1999)
- Vuelve Junto a Mi (2000)
- Secreto de Amor (2001)
- Lejana como el viento (2002)
- Rebeca (2003)
- Anita no te rajes (2004)
- Tierra de Pasiones (2006)
- Bajo las Riendas del Amor (2007)
- El Rostro de Analía (2008)
- Cuento Sin Hadas (2009) (film)
- Perro amor (2010)
- El Fantasma de Elena (2010)
- Mi Corazón Insiste… en Lola Volcán (2011)
- El Laberinto (2012)
- Marido En Alquiler (2013)

Preceded by Maritza Pineda	Miss Venezuela; 1976 (resigned)	Succeeded by Judith Castillo
