= María Rosa, búscame una esposa =

- Genre: Telenovela
- Created by: Luis Felipe Salamanca; Dago García
- Written by: Perla Ramírez
- Directed by: Aldo Salvini; Lucho Barrios
- Starring: Gianella Neyra; Marcelo Cezán; Chiquinquirá Delgado; Orlando Fundichely
- Opening theme: Lo Haré Por Ti by Paulina Rubio
- Country of origin: Perú
- Original language: Spanish
- No. of episodes: 120

Production
- Executive producer: Margarita Morales Macedo S.R.
- Production location: Perú
- Production companies: Venevisión International; Iguana Producciones

Original release
- Network: Venevisión
- Release: January 8 – June 20, 2000

María Rosa, búscame una esposa is a Peruvian telenovela created by Luis Felipe Salamanca and Dago García, and co-produced by Venevisión International and Iguana Producciones. The series lasted 120 episodes and was distributed internationally by Venevisión International.

Gianella Neyra and Marcelo Cezán starred as the protagonists with Chiquinquirá Delgado as the antagonist.

== Synopsis ==
Of all the assignments given to Maria Rosa Garcia by her boss in the many years they have worked together, the most difficult one comes when he tells her: "Maria Rosa, find me a wife". A consummate bachelor with very little time or energy to invest in dating, Rafael Vargas suddenly decides that it is time to get married before anyone in his social circle starts doubting his masculinity. And what better way to find the perfect candidate than to assign the task to his super-efficient secretary?

The problem is that Maria Rosa has been hopelessly in love with Rafael since the day she began working at his company. The instant attraction soon developed into a profound love that has become the core of her existence - although she never made her feelings known. To the successful businessman, Maria Rosa is the most capable and loyal of employees, but nothing more. He has never seen her as a woman, and she has resigned herself to this in silence just so she can be near him. She has spent years doing a job that has proven indispensable for the company but has given her no personal rewards. Her only consolation has been Rafael’s lack of interest in establishing a serious relationship with anyone. That is why it pains her to discover that he is ready to marry anyone but her.

After recovering from the initial blow, Maria Rosa decides that the best way to handle this is to pretend that she is conducting an efficient search through serious matchmaking services, when in fact she is sabotaging the process by subjecting the candidates to tests so unreasonable that practically no one could pass. This way she makes sure that Rafael never finds the ideal bride, and at the same time musters enough courage to change her strategy, become more attractive and try to win his love once and for all. But Maria Rosa’s drastic change only confuses Rafael, who thinks his secretary is acting "weird" because she works too hard. His solution is to send her abroad on a fully paid vacation.

Taking that trip turns out to be a terrible mistake for Maria Rosa, as upon her return she finds that a cunning, evil, ruthlessly ambitious woman has not only occupied her place in the company, but also stolen Rafael’s unconquerable heart, taking him to the altar transformed into a love-blind puppet. This is the beginning of a long journey of misfortune for Rafael, orchestrated by the wicked Eva. And only one woman will be able to save him from this cruel fate: the ever loyal and loving Maria Rosa.

== Cast ==
- Gianella Neyra as Maria Rosa Garcia
- Marcelo Cezán as Rafael Vargas
- Chiquinquirá Delgado as Eva Amador
- Orlando Fundicelly as Miguel Cortes
- Rebeca Scribens as Yolanda Garcia
- Orlando Sacha]] as Hernan Garcia
- Javier Delgudice as Hector
- Gabriel Calvo as Federico Forero
- Ana Maria Verela as Libia Cadena
- Marcelo Oxenford as Fidel
- Mirtha Patiño as Perla Muñoz
- Rodrigo Sanchez Patiño as Mario Cortes
- Milagros Lopez as Cristina Cortes
- Omero Cristali as Martin Diaz
- Mabel Duclos as Ana Forero
- Bernie Paz as Gonzalo
