= Eduardo Serrano (actor) =

Venezuelan actor (1942–2025)

- Born: Andrés Eduardo Serrano Acevedo; 30 November 1942; Caracas, Venezuela
- Died: 11 September 2025 (aged 82); Miami, Florida, U.S.
- Spouses: Carmen Julia Álvarez (m. 1968–1975); Mirtha Pérez (m. 1975–1992); Haidy Velázquez (m. 1995–2025)

Andrés Eduardo Serrano Acevedo (30 November 1942 – 11 September 2025) was a Venezuelan actor, best known as the evil patron Rogelio Vivas in Coral International telenovela Juana la virgen. He also participated in many other events. For example, in 1979 he co-presented the eighth edition of the OTI Festival, which was held in Caracas.

== Life and career ==
Born in Caracas, Venezuela on 30 November 1942, Serrano was married three times. From his second marriage to Mirtha Pérez, he had one child. He was also married to Carmen Julia Álvarez from 1968 to 1975 and Haidy Velásquez from 1995 until 2013. Serrano had three children with Haidy. His children's names are Magaly Andreina, Miguel Eduardo, and Leonardo Andrés. Serrano died in Miami, Florida, United States on 11 September 2025, following lung cancer. He was 82.

== Filmography ==
=== Television ===
- La suerte de Loli (2021)
- La Fan (2017)
- Milagros De Navidad (2017)
- Tomame o Dejame (2015)
- Demente Criminal (2015) as Andrew Yepez.
- Escandalos: Todo es real, excepto sus nombres (2014–2015)
- El Rostro de la Venganza (2012–2013)
- Natalia del mar (2011)
- La Mujer Perfecta (2010–2011)
- Si me miran tus ojos (2010)
- Dame Chocolate (2007)
- Ferrando, de pura sangre (2006 miniseries)
- El Desprecio (2006)
- Decisiones (2005)
- El cuerpo del deseo (2005)
- ¡Anita, no te rajes! (2004)
- Juana la virgen (2002)
- Viva la Pepa (2001)
- Soledad (2001)
- Muñeca de trapo (2000)
- Mujercitas (1999)
- Cambio de Piel (1998)
- La Inolvidable (1996)
- Volver a Vivir (1996)
- Piel (1992)
- Emperatriz (1990)
- La Sombra de Piera (1989)
- Amor de Abril (1988)
- Y la luna también (1987)
- Las Amazonas (1985)
- El sol sale para todos (1985)
- Sorangel (1981)
- Andreina (1981)
- Emilia (1980)
- La Zulianita (1977)
- Cumbres borrascosas (1976)
- Mily (1973)

=== Film ===
- The Celibacy / The Celibacy (2011)
- Tosca, la verdadera historia / Tosca, the True Story (2001)
- Juegos bajo la luna (2000)
- Cangrejo II (1984)
