= Mónica Montañés =

Venezuelan screenwriter, playwright and journalist

- Born: 22 November 1966 (age 59)
- Education: Universidad Católica Andrés Bello
- Occupations: Screenwriter, playwright, journalist

Mónica Montañés (born 22 November 1966) is a Venezuelan screenwriter, playwright and journalist. She is known for producing telenovelas such as Guerra de mujeres, Voltea pa' que te enamores, Válgame Dios and Para verte mejor.

== Career ==
She became known as a playwright thanks to the play El aplauso va por dentro, which premiered in Caracas on 7 June 1996, toured the country's billboards for several years, was presented in cities such as New York City, Madrid, Bogotá, Santiago de Chile, Lisbon, Miami, Los Angeles, Aveiro, Funchal, Tenerife and Huesca and was broadcast on HBO Olé, in the space 7mo Sentido program. Sin voz, a play that premiered in Caracas in 1997, received a Marco Antonio Ettegui Award mention the same year.

As a journalist, she worked in the art and entertainment section of El Diario de Caracas for between 1990 and 1995, as communications director of the Caracas Athenaeum between 1995 and 1996, as entertainment columnist for the SuperClable magazine between 1999 and 2000, and as columnist of the Estampas magazine of El Universal between 2000 and 2006.

== Screenwriter ==
=== Television ===
- El perdón de los pecados (1996–1997)
- Contra viento y marea (1998–99)
- Más que amor, frenesí (2001)
- Guerra de Mujeres (2001–2002)
- Las González (2002)
- Voltea pa' que te enamores' (2007)
- ¿Vieja yo? (2009)
- Harina de otro costal (2010)
- Válgame Dios (2012)
- Para verte mejor (2016-2017)

=== Theater ===
- El aplauso va por dentro (1997)
- Caí redonda (2000)
- Veintitantos amores y pico (2004)
- Parece Mentira (2003)
- Yo, Tú, Ella (2005)
- Perlas falsas (2005)
- Desconocidos (2009)

=== Books ===
- Los distintos (Ekaré, 2020)
