= Gabriela Fleritt =

Venezuelan actress and comedian (1971–2026)

- Born: Gabriela Verónica Fleritt Hernández; 14 February 1971; Caracas, Venezuela
- Died: c. 24 June 2026 (aged 55); La Guaira, Venezuela
- Other name: The Fat Lady
- Occupations: Actress, comedian, radio announcer

Gabriela Verónica Fleritt Hernández (14 February 1971 – c. 24 June 2026), known as La Gorda Fleuri, was a Venezuelan actress, radio announcer and comedian. She was known for programs such as Bienvenidos (1993–2001) with Miguel Ángel Landa, La guerra de los sexos (2000–2003), Cheverísimo (2001–2002), and ¡A que te ríes! (2010–2013).

Thanks to Bienvenidos, she internationalized her career with sketches like Silfide Bombina and Koke & Gaby (alongside Koke Corona). Due to the great success of the program, along with the cast of Bienvenidos, she toured internationally in more than 30 countries where live shows were presented, including Broadway theaters at the Beacon Theatre in Manhattan, New York City, United States. With Ricardo Peña, she was part of La Guerra de los Sexos from 2000 to 2003 in the segment "El paredón y la víctima," with which she toured the International Orchid Festival (2000–2002) in Zulia, the San Sebastián International Fair (2001–2002) in Táchira, and the Sun Fair (2001–2002) in Mérida.

Fleritt was killed in the 2026 Venezuela earthquakes on 24 June 2026.

== Early life and career ==
Fleritt studied acting at the Free Workshop for Actors, entering Venevisión in 1993 with the telenovela Amor de papel and was followed by others such as El amor las vuelve locas (2005), Los Querendones (2006), Amor urbano (2009) and Natalia del mar (2011).

She ventured into comedy after joining the Venevisión comedy program Bienvenidos from 1993 to 2001, playing the character Silfide Bombina. From 2 September 2000 to 12 April 2003, she was a regular cast member on the game show La Guerra de los Sexos (The Battle of the Sexes), in the segment "El paredón y la víctima" (The Wall and the Victim) alongside César Sojo, a program where she also became a contestant. In 2003 and 2004, she also participated in Mega Match as part of the segment " El carro pleno " (The Full Car), hosted by Chiquinquirá Delgado and Samir Bazzi.

After the cancellation of Bienvenidos, she joined the cast of Cheverísimo from 2001 until its final broadcast in 2002. She also participated in various commercials for the now-defunct supermarket chain Cada for a time. She received numerous awards for her outstanding acting in many plays and telenovelas. From 2010 to 2014, she was part of the cast of ¡A que te ríes!. Starting in 2011, she began working for TVes on the comedy program Chisparate and later on Humorísimo.

Furthermore, she also acted in plays such as Avenida Lecuna, Médico a palo, Canaima, Un curioso accidente, and Yo también soy Candidato by Román Chalbaud; El Circo de los Sueños by Dairo Piñeros; Más abajo no es pecado by Pompeyo Izquierdo; El miedoso asustado; Aquí no paga nadie; and Hasta que ella nos separe by José Luis Useche. In addition, she participated in numerous plays for the television program Bienvenidos, presented in Latin America and in several U.S. cities, including Miami, New York, and Los Angeles, including a Broadway performance at the Beacon Theatre in Manhattan, New York, United States, on 17 April 1999.

== Death ==
Fleritt was reported missing on 26 June 2026 after two M_{w} 7.2 and M_{w} 7.5 earthquakes struck western Venezuela on 24 June. Her body was discovered the next day in La Guaira.

== Filmography ==
=== Film ===
- Ay mamá: Una familia venezolana en navidad (2024)

=== Soap operas ===
- 1993: Amor de papel – Gisela
- 2005: El amor las vuelve locas – Paquita Vázquez
- 2006: Los querendones
- 2009: Amor urbano – Emerita
- 2011: Natalia del Mar – Ruperta Barriga

=== Programs ===
- Bienvenidos (1993–2001)
- La guerra de los sexos (2 September 2000 to 12 April 2003) – Victim of "Paredón y la victima" / (2003–2005; 2012) – Participant
- Cheverísimo (2001–2002)
- Mega Match (2003–2004) – Recurring guest
- El Precipicio (2009) – Participant
- ¡A que te ríes! (2010–2013)
- El Show del vacilon (2015)
- Chisparate (2017)
- Humorisimo (2017)
- La dama y el vigilante (2019–2020)

=== DVD Movies ===
- Bienvenidos en la playa (2005)
- Bienvenidos en la alcoba (2005)
- Bienvenidos en el restaurante (2005)
- Lo mejor de Bienvenidos: Colección de oro (2005)
- Lo mejor de Bienvenidos: Sus personajes (2005)
- Bienvenidos en la oficina (2005)

=== Festivals ===
- Festival Internacional de la Orquídea (2001–2002)
- Feria internacional del sol (2001–2002)
- Feria de San Sebastián (2001–2002)
- V de oro de Venevisión (2001)
- Especial Por amor a Venezuela (2002)

=== Records and CD'S ===
- Boberto y sus amigos (2004)
- El Show de Bienvenidos (1994, Sonorodven)
