= Roberto Lamarca =

Venezuelan actor

- Born: Roberto Lamarca Gabriele; October 4, 1959; Corato, Province of Bari, Italia
- Died: February 22, 2017 (aged 57); Caracas, Venezuela
- Occupation: Actor
- Years active: 1971–2016
- Spouse: Caridad Canelón (m. 1983–1995)

Roberto Lamarca Gabriele (October 4, 1959 – February 22, 2017) was an Italo-Venezuelan television actor. He is mostly recognised for his portrayal of Arístides Valerio, the recurring character on the Radio Caracas Televisión drama series Por estas calles.

== Biography ==
He had 2 brothers and 2 sisters. Lamarca was the father of three children: Joselyn, Angélica and Sophia. The actor was married to Venezuelan actress Caridad Canelón.

== Health and death ==
On January 27, 2017 he was emergency hospitalized in a clinic, located in Altamira, due to a respiratory complication. The actor underwent a biopsy in June 2016 to detect a possible lung cancer; But at that time the result was negative.

He died on the night of Wednesday, February 22, 2017 at the home of his "brother for life" Omar Meléndez, as he suffered from a complicated respiratory illness having battled histoplasmosis for several months.

== Filmography ==
Television roles and films
Year	Title	Role	Notes
1971	Bárbara	Vitico	
1973	Raquel	Kike niño	
1987	La intrusa	Lisandro	
1988	La Muchacha del circo		
1988	Abigail	Ismael	
1991	El desprecio		
1992–94	Por estas calles	Arístides Valerio	
1996	Los amores de Anita Peña		
1997	Contra viento y marea	Nicolás	
1997	Destino de mujer	Ignacio	
1998	El país de las mujeres	Tino Urutia	
2000	Amantes de Luna Llena	Troconis	
2001	Guerra de mujeres	Fabián Botero	
2002	Las González	Otto de Jesús	
2003	Cosita rica	Diómedes Crespo	
2005	El amor las vuelve locas		
2006	Los Querendones	Chon	1 episode
2007	13 segundos	Alonso	Film
2007	Aunque mal paguen		
2008	La vida entera	Tamanaco Rangel	
2009	Tomasa Tequiero	Perucho	
2011–12	Natalia del mar	Teodoro Rivas	56 episodes
2013–14	De todas maneras Rosa	Genaro Barreto	108 episodes
2016	Entre tu amor y mi amor	Augusto Machado	26 episodes
