= Andreina Yépez =

Venezuelan actress and comedian (1974–2026)

- Born: 30 November 1974; Caracas, Venezuela
- Died: 25 August 2026 (aged 51); Miami, Florida, U.S.
- Occupations: Actress, comedian

Gladys Andreina Yépez (30 November 1974 – 25 August 2026) was a Venezuelan actress and comedian, best known in Venezuela for her appearances on the Venevisión telenovelas Cosita rica (2003–2004) and La mujer perfecta (2010–2011). Yépez started her career as a dancer and model, appearing as a child on El Show de Joselo in the 1980s, before moving to comedy and television roles in the 1990s.

== Career ==
Yépez began her career in entertainment at the age of 14, appearing in the comedy show El Show de Joselo. She spent her early career working as an actress and model before turning to acting and comedy, appearing on the comedy shows Cheverísimo and Bienvenidos. Her breakthrough in the industry came after she danced in the music video for La Piernona, by Miguel Moly. She joined Venevisión in 1992 and made her first appearance in a telenovela, Por amarte tanto, the following year.

Throughout the 1990s, she appeared on television shows including Sol de tentación, Pecado de amor, and El País de las mujeres; in the 2000s, Yépez played the role of 'Melao' on the Venevisión telenovela Cosita rica, which, alongside her appearances on La mujer perfecta became one of her best-known appearances. She continued to appear in telenovelas, playing a police officer in Ciudad bendita (2006–2007) and taking roles in La vida entera (2009) and Dulce amargo (2012–2013).

In addition to her work on television, Yépez acted on stage and appeared in the films Pandemonium, la capital del infierno (1997) and Er Conde Jones (2011). She also became a social media personality and hosted the entertainment show Vente conmigo. Alongside Sergio Novelli, she appeared on the prank show ¡Qué Locura!.

== Personal life and death ==
Gladys Andreina Yépez was born on 30 November 1974 in Caracas, Venezuela. Raised by her mother, who worked as a secretary for Venezuelan entertainers Alfredo Sadel and Renny Ottolina, Yépez had two younger siblings.

She had a daughter, born in the mid 1990s. She moved to the United States later in life, where she lived with her daughter.

Yépez was diagnosed with pancreatic cancer in 2026. She died in Miami, Florida, on 25 August, a month after her diagnosis. Yépez was 51.

== Filmography ==
=== Television ===
- El Show de Joselo
- Cheverísimo
- Bienvenidos
- Por amarte tanto (1993)
- Pecado de amor (1995)
- Sol de tentación (1997–1997)
- El País de las mujeres (1998–1999) as Yulessi
- Toda mujer (2000)
- Hechizo de amor (2000)
- Amantes de luna llena (2000–2001)
- Mambo y canela (2002)
- Trapos íntimos (2002–2003)
- Cosita rica (2003–2004) as Melao
- El amor las vuelve locas (2005)
- Ciudad bendita (2006–2007) as Zulay Montiel Barranco
- La vida entera (2009)
- La mujer perfecta (2010–2011)
- Dulce amargo (2012–2013)

=== Film ===
- Pandemonium, la capital del infierno (1997)
- Er Conde Jones (2011)
