= Claudia La Gatta =

Venezuelan actress and model

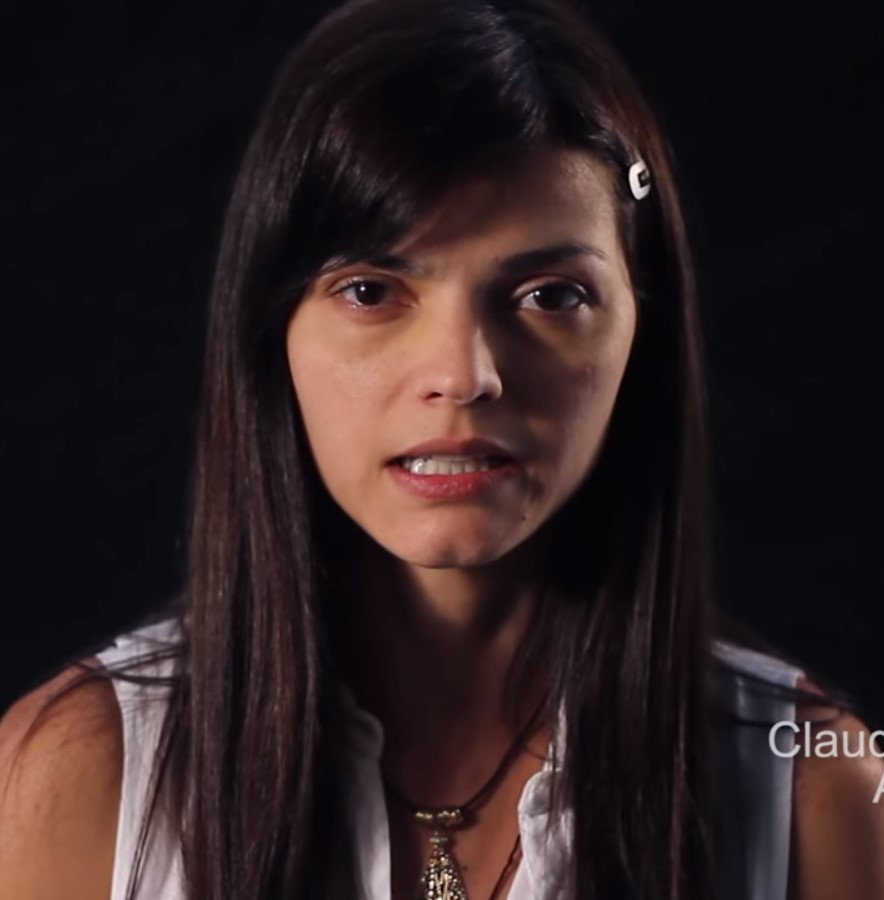
- La Gatta in 2014
- Born: Claudia Virginia La Gatta Quintana; October 9, 1979 (age 45); Caracas, Venezuela
- Occupation(s): Actress, model
- Years active: 2004-present
- Spouse: Luis Gerónimo Abreu (m. 2010)
- Children: 1

Claudia Virginia La Gatta Quintana (born October 9, 1979) is a Venezuelan actress, model and beauty pageant titleholder best known for participating in telenovelas from Venezuela.

== Personal life ==
She is married to the actor Luis Gerónimo Abreu from 2010. In 2015 was born their first child next to Luis Gerónimo called Salvador Abreu.

== Filmography ==
=== Films ===
Year	Title	Role	Notes
2011	Travesía del desierto	Patricia	Film debut
2014	Espejos	Arianna	

=== Television ===
Year	Title	Role	Notes
2004	Sabor a ti	Cherryl	
2005	El amor las vuelve locas	Cristina	
2006	Los Querendones	Milady Castillo	
2007	Mi prima Ciela	Ruth Berroterán	
2008	La vida entera	Claudia	
2010	La mujer perfecta	Isabella Andrade	
2011	Flor Salvaje	Clara	
2012	Válgame Dios	Liseth	"La Bruja vio todo... y más" (Season 1, Episode 2); "¡Y todo por culpa de un pasticho de berenjena!" (Season 1, Episode 3)
2013	Las Bandidas	Malena Montoya	
2014	Nora	Irina Casado	
2017	El Chema	Alina Martínez	
