= Lourdes Valera =

Venezuelan actress (1963–2012)

- Born: Lourdes del Valle Valera Galvis; 15 June 1963; Caracas, Venezuela
- Died: 2 May 2012 (aged 48); Caracas, Venezuela
- Education: Universidad Central de Venezuela
- Occupation: Actor
- Spouse: Luis Alberto Lamata

Lourdes del Valle Valera Galvis (15 June 1963 – 2 May 2012) was a Venezuelan actress who took part in over twenty film and television productions during her career, particularly known for her acting in many telenovelas.

== Career ==
Valera first took part in theater at age ten with her primary school's theater group. In 1979, at sixteen years old, she made her television debut on the RCTV program Radio Rochela, where she developed her comedy skills as a comedian. She also was on the program Niño de papel. In 1983, Valera was cast in her first telenovela, the Venezuelan soap opera Leonela.

In addition to her acting, her mother insisted that Valera complete her education, and she graduated with a degree in social communication from the Central University of Venezuela.

In 1985, Valera started a role in the soap opera Cristal, and then continued to act in many other soap operas throughout her career, including La vida entera, Ciudad Bendita, Se solicita príncipe azul, Cosita rica, Las González, Guerra de mujeres, Amantes de luna llena, Enséñame a querer, El país de las mujeres, Contra viento y marea, La llaman Mariamor, Cruz de nadie, Las dos Dianas, Señora, and Topacio.

== Personal life ==
In 1993, Valera married film director Luis Alberto Lamata, whom she met in 1984. The couple never had children. In 2008, after examinations for possible cosmetic surgery, she was diagnosed with lung cancer, from which she temporarily recovered. A relapse in 2011 caused her death on 2 May 2012.

== Filmography ==
=== Television ===
- El árbol de Gabriel (2011) - Bárbara Miranda
- La vida entera (2008) - Rosa Coronel
- Ciudad Bendita (2006) - Francisca "Ñinguita"/"Burusa
- Se solicita príncipe azul (2005) - Miriam Rondón
- Cosita rica (2003) - "La Chata"
- Las González (2002) - Bromelia
- Guerra de mujeres (2001) - Dolores "Lolita"
- Amantes de luna llena (2000) - Guadalupe "Lupita" Madera
- Enséñame a querer (1998) - Matea
- El país de las mujeres (1998) - Chiqui Gallardo Gómez
- Contra viento y marea (1997) - "La Zurda"
- La llaman Mariamor (1996) - Francesca
- Cruz de nadie (1994)
- El paseo de la gracia de Dios (1993) - Emma
- Divina obsesión (1992) - Amelia
- Las dos Dianas (1992) - Rosa "Rosita"
- La traidora (1991) - Sofía
- Señora

(1989) - Betty

- Amanda Sabater

(1988) - Zoraida

- Cristal

(1985) - Zoraida "Cerebrito"

- Topacio (1984) - Violeta
- Leonela (1983)

=== Films ===
- Cuidado con lo que sueñas (2012) - de Geyka Urdaneta
- Patas arriba (2011) - Monserrat
- Taita Boves (2010)
- El enemigo (2008) - Antonieta Sánchez
- 13 segundos (2007) - Mercedes
- Rosa de Francia (1995)
- Desnudo con naranjas (1994) - Margarita

== Theater ==
- Sólo dementes
- Toc Toc
- A 2.50 la Cuba libre
- Confesiones de mujeres de 30
- Brujas
