= Montañés =

Montañés may refer to:

- Montañés (surname)
- Montañés-class ship of the line, a Spanish Navy class of one ship
  - Spanish ship Montañés (1794), a Spanish Navy third-rate ship of the line
- French ship Pluton (1805), captured by the Spanish in 1808 and later renamed Montañés
- Montañés, a group of subdialects of the Cantabrian dialect of Spain

== See also ==
- Montané, a surname
