= Contra viento y marea =

Contra viento y marea may refer to:

- Contra viento y marea (Mexican TV series), a 2005 Mexican telenovela
- Contra viento y marea (Venezuelan TV series), a 1997 Venezuelan telenovela
