= Beba Rojas =

Venezuelan actress, model and comedian (born 1975)

- Born: Reymarvi Rojas Velazco; September 25, 1975 (age 50); Caracas, Venezuela
- Occupations: Actress, Comedian

Reymarvi Rojas Velazco, better known as Beba Rojas (born September 25, 1975) is a Venezuelan actress, model and comedian.

She began her artistic career in the Venezuelan television channel Venevisión after completing her studies at the Universidad Central de Venezuela. She made her debut as a comedian in the humorous television show Bienvenidos. She later became an actress in various telenovelas on the same channel.

Beba is married and has a son named Fabio Alejandro.

== Filmography ==
=== Telenovelas ===
- Como tú, ninguna (1994) Thais
- Pecado de Amor (1995) Mariela
- Sol de Tentación (1996) Noche
- Guerra de mujeres (2001-2002) Graciela Gamboa
- Las González (2002) Azalea
- Cosita Rica (2003) Panchita
- El amor las vuelve locas (2005) Lily Fajardo
- La viuda joven (2011) Vicenta Palacios de Humboldt
- Natalia del Mar (2002) Ella Misma
- Válgame Dios as (2012) La peor es nada
- De todas maneras Rosa (2013) Ada Luz Campanero
- Piel salvaje (2016) La Chila Pérez

=== Films ===
- El Caracazo (2005)
- Al fin y al cabo (2008)

=== Programs ===
- Bienvenidos
- Bailando con las estrellas
- Cásate y veras
