= Carlos Olivier =

Venezuelan actor

- Born: January 26, 1952; Caracas, Venezuela
- Died: January 22, 2007 (aged 54); Caracas, Venezuela

Carlos Olivier (Carlos Raúl Fernández Olivier) (26 January 1952 – 22 January 2007), was a Venezuelan actor, famous for his roles in telenovelas, including Leonela, El País de las Mujeres, Viva la Pepa, Las González, Engañada, and Los Querendones.

Olivier was a member of the Factory of Young Actors of RCTV. During the five years that he lived in the United States, Olivier appeared in two episodes of the police TV series Miami Vice, hosted the TV show El Gran Evento con Carlos Olivier on Telemundo, and recorded two albums with producer Emilio Estefan.

Olivier combined his passion for acting with the medicine.

Carlos Olivier died of a cardiac arrest in Caracas.

== Filmography ==
- Historia de amor (1968)
- Prisionero de Zenda
- El hombre de la máscara de hierro
- La noche de los sapos
- El ángel rebelde (1978) - Renato
- Alejandra (1976)
- Estefanía (1979) - Julio Cesar Ordoñez
- Gómez I (1980)
- Gómez II (1982)
- Me llamo Julián, te quiero (1972)
- Secreto (1971)
- Sor campanita
- La dama de las camelias
- Orgullo (1974) - Celestino
- La señora de Cárdenas (1977)
- Natalia
- Rosalinda (1981) - Martin Fajardo
- Angelito (1981)
- Martha y Javier (1981) - Dr. Javier Contreras
- Bienvenida Esperanza (1983) - Jacinto Nuñez
- Leonela (1984) - Pedro Luis Guerra
- Miedo al amor (1984) - Pedro Luis Guerra
- La muchacha de los ojos café (1986-1987) - Juan Pedro Subero
- Enamorada (1986) - Daniel Isturiz
- De mujeres (1990) - Luis Fernando Izaguirre
- Pecado de Amor (1996) - Don Ricardo
- Contra viento y marea (1997) - Don Aquiles Millan
- Carita pintada (1999) - Paolo Richi / Paulino Rossi
- Cuando Hay Pasion (1999) - Don Reynaldo Nuñez Anzola
- Hay amores que matan (2000) - Don Gumersindo Montenegro
- Viva la pepa (2001) - Don Perucho Galan
- Las González (2002) - Don Cayetano Mora
- Engañada (2003) - Don Miguel Pantoja
- ¡Qué buena se puso Lola! (2004) - Don Fernando Estrada
- Los Querendones (2006) - Don Erasmo Griman

== See also ==
- Venezuela
- Venezuelan culture
