= Adolfo Cubas =

Venezuelan actor

- Born: Miguel Adolfo Cubas Contreras; December 2, 1964 (age 61); Valencia, Venezuela
- Occupation: Actor
- Years active: 1984-present
- Children: 1

Miguel Adolfo Cubas Contreras (born December 2, 1964) is a Venezuelan actor.

== Biography ==
Miguel Adolfo Cubas Contreras was born on December 2, 1964, in Caracas, Venezuela. He grew up in a conservative family. Cubas wanted to become a priest and he attended a Catholic seminar school with that purpose in mind, but he left the school after two years. He has admitted that as a teenager he attempted to commit suicide.

== Personal life ==
Adolfo Cubas has a daughter who was born in 1987. Adolfo Cubas divorced in 1998. In 2005, a brain tumor was removed that nearly ended his life. Once recovered, he had to endure criticism for having publicly thanked the former president Hugo Chávez for his help because the insurance did not cover the intervention and he could not pay for it. Chávez had also arranged the operation at the Hospital Militar Dr. Carlos Arvelo. In 2010, it was revealed that he had a relationship with Ricky Martin. On May 18, 2013, he became the godfather of a girl named Roiderlyn Martínez.

== Career ==
Adolfo Cubas started to become involved in the entertainment world when he met and befriended members of Los Chamos, a famous 1980s boy band. Cubas led Carlos Baute to become involved in Los Chamos. Cubas also became a friend of Menudo's Ricky Martin. From 1984 to 1987, Cubas himself became a member of Los Chamos. In 1987, Cubas made his telenovela debut, participating in Mi amada Beatriz. From 1988 to 1989, he was part of the cast of the television series Abigail. Cubas participated in two other telenovelas before he joined Guillermo Dávila and Sonya Smith in 1992's Cara Sucia one of Venevision's most famous telenovelas of all time. He shaved his head and has participated in seventeen other film productions since. Cubas participated in a Playboy Channel Latino production which was recorded in Peru.

== Filmography ==
=== Television ===
| Year | Title | Character | Channel |
|---|---|---|---|
| 1987 | Roberta | Nico | RCTV |
| 1987 | Mi amada Beatriz | Miguel Ángel | RCTV |
| 1988-1989 | Abigail | Leonel Santana | RCTV |
| 1989 | Rubí rebelde | Nelson "El Niño" Miranda | RCTV |
| 1990-1991 | De mujeres | Rafael Fucho Izaguirre | RCTV |
| 1992 | Cara sucia | Antonio González de la Vega | Venevisión |
| 1993-1994 | Ángel o Demonio | Jaime Andrés | Ecuavisa |
| 1994 | María Celeste | Horacio | Venevisión |
| 1995-1996 | Dulce Enemiga | Ulises Romano | Venevisión |
| 1996 | Pecado de amor | | Venevisión |
| 1996-1997 | Sol de tentación | Emilio Berdugo | Venevisión |
| 1999-2000 | Enamorada | Rafael Orozco | Venevisión Internacional |
| 1999-2000 | Toda mujer | Renato Chacín | Venevisión |
| 2000-2001 | Amantes de luna llena | Macedonio Borges | Venevisión |
| 2001 | Ilusiones compartidas | Rolando Alfaro Moreno | Canal 13 |
| 2002 | Mambo y canela | Franco | Venevisión |
| 2003 | Rebeca | Natalio Gil Gómez | Venevisión Internacional |
| 2003-2004 | Cosita rica | Mocho Ni Ni | Venevisión |
| 2005 | Ser bonita no basta | Justo Olavarría | RCTV |
| 2006 | El desprecio | Cirílo Santamaría | RCTV |
| 2007 | Mi prima Ciela | Esteban Espinoza | RCTV |
| 2008-2009 | La vida entera | Javier | Venevisión |
| 2012-2013 | Dulce amargo | Dr. Relicario Ángulo | Televen |
| 2014 | Los secretos de Lucía | Cabo Segura | Venevisión |
| 2014 | Corazón esmeralda | Rodrigo Beltrán | Venevisión |
| 2015 | Guerreras y Centauros | Canelón "Abracadabra" Bocanegras | TVes |
| 2015-2016 | Vivir para amar | Pedraza | TVes |

=== Movies ===
| Year | Movie | Character | Director |
|---|---|---|---|
| 2001 | Nada por perder | | Enrique Aguilar |

=== Television Programs ===
| Year | Program | Channel | Notes |
|---|---|---|---|
| 2015-2016 | Generación S | Venevisión | Judge |
