= Corazón esmeralda =

Television series

- Genre: Telenovela
- Created by: Vivel Nouel
- Written by: Vivel Nouel; Zaret Romero
- Directed by: José Luis Zuleta
- Starring: Irene Esser; Luis Gerónimo Abreu; Mimí Lazo; Jorge Reyes; Dora Mazzone; María Antonieta Duque; Juliet Lima; Cristóbal Lander; Jean Carlo Simancas; Mariángel Ruiz
- Opening theme: "Anhelante" by Francisco León
- Country of origin: Venezuela
- Original language: Spanish
- No. of episodes: 139 - 134(brazil)

Production
- Executive producer: Sandra Rioboo
- Production locations: El Consejo, Aragua
- Running time: 43-45 minutes

Original release
- Network: Venevisión
- Release: March 3 – September 30, 2014

Corazón esmeralda is a Venezuelan telenovela written by Vivel Nouel and adapted by Zaret Romero for Venevisión.

Irene Esser and Luis Gerónimo Abreu star as the protagonists while Mimi Lazo, Jorge Reyes, Juliet Lima and Maria Antonieta Duque star as the main antagonists. With the participation of Dora Mazzone, Jean Carlo Simancas and Cristóbal Lander.

As of March 10, 2014, Venevisión started broadcasting Corazón Esmeralda at 9:00 pm. The last episode was broadcast on September 30, 2014. Official production of Corazón Esmeralda began on 11 June 2013 in Aragua.

== Plot ==
Corazón esmeralda tells the story of Beatriz Elena Beltrán, a young and beautiful ecologist who starts a campaign against wealthy businessman César Augusto Salvatierra whose industries are responsible for causing pollution in the town of Valle Bonito. César Augusto is a workaholic with three failed marriages and four children who are concerned with getting his fortune after his death. Therefore, he decides to seek out his long lost daughter with Marina Lozano, the only woman he ever loved. But what he doesn't know is that Beatriz is the long lost daughter he is looking for. He asks his godson and lawyer Juan Andrés Montalvo to search for his missing daughter so that she can receive part of his fortune.

After his death, his family becomes frustrated from a clause in his will that they can only receive their inheritance once they find the fifth heiress. His first ex-wife Federica hires Marcelo, a scoundrel and womanizing lawyer, to help her conspire get their hands on the Salvatierra fortune.

As Juan Andrés continues his search for his god-fathers long lost daughter, he falls in love with Beatriz, not knowing that she is the fifth heiress he is looking for. But their love will be tested by the jealousy, secrets and greed that surrounds them as the Salvatierra family and those close to them conspire to obtain the inheritance for themselves.

== Cast ==
Confirmed as of April 26, 2013

=== Main cast ===
- Irene Esser as Beatriz Elena Beltrán
- Luis Gerónimo Abreu as Juan Andrés Montalvo Cordero
- Mimí Lazo as Federica del Rosario Pérez. Main villain
- Jorge Reyes as Marcelo Egaña. Main villain
- Dora Mazzone as Hortensia Estela Palacios Uribe
- María Antonieta Duque as Blanca Aurora López
- Juliet Lima as Vanessa Villamizar. Villain
- Cristóbal Lander as Luis David León
- Jean Carlo Simancas as César Augusto Salvatierra
- Mariángel Ruiz as Marina Lozano

=== Also as main cast ===
- Flávia Gleske as Fernanda Salvatierra Pérez
- Paula Woyzechowsky as Elia Magdalena Salvatierra Palacios
- Sheryl Rubio as Rocío del Alba Salvatierra López
- Daniel Martínez-Campos as Napoleón Antonio Salvatierra López
- Myriam Abreu as Lorena Martínez
- José Ramón Barreto as Miguel Blanco
- Sindy Lazo as Melinda Guaramato

=== Supporting cast ===
- Flor Elena González as Isabel Cordero de Montalvo
- Beatriz Vásquez as Luisa Amelia Blanco
- Alejandro Mata as Silvestre Montalvo
- Julio Pereira as Ramón José Blanco
- Adolfo Cubas as Rodrigo Beltrán
- Ludwig Pineda as Domingo Renjifo
- Josué Villae as Bruno Álvarez
- Rhandy Piñango as Jaime Batista
- Carmen Alicia Lara as Liliana Blanco
- Reina Hinojosa as Ricarda
