= María Antonieta Duque =

Venezuelan actress (born 1970)

- Born: María Antonieta Duque; 2 March 1970 (age 56); Caracas, Venezuela
- Occupations: Actress, TV Presenter

María Antonieta Duque (born 2 March 1970) is a Venezuelan TV presenter, comedian and actress.

She studied acting at the famous Luz Columba academy under the instruction of professor Nelson Ortega.

Her television career began in 1989 in the sketch comedy show Bienvenidos. She landed her first acting role in the telenovela Amantes de Luna Llena in 2000.

She was one of the judges for the 2023 Miss Venezuela pageant.

== Telenovelas ==
- Amantes de Luna Llena (2000) as Angelica
- Guerra de mujeres (2001) as Blanca
- Las González (2002) as Gardenia
- Ángel Rebelde (2004) as Rubi
- El amor las vuelve locas (2005) as Amapola
- Voltea pa' que te enamores (2007) as Matilde Sanchez
- ¿Vieja Yo? (2009) as Tamara Lujan de Fuentes/Maricarmen
- La viuda joven (2011) as Iris Fuenmayor/Vilma Bravo
- El árbol de Gabriel (2012) as Patricia
- Válgame Dios (2012) as Gloria Zamora
- Corazón Esmeralda (2014) as Blanca Aurora López
- Entre tu amor y mi amor (2016) as Ricarda Blanco "Rika White"
- Para verte mejor (2017) as Lázara Martínez

== Programs ==
- Bienvenidos
