= Rebeca (TV series) =

- Genre: Telenovela
- Created by: Alberto Gómez
- Directed by: Freddy Trujillo; Yaky Ortega
- Starring: Mariana Seoane; Ricardo Álamo; Víctor Cámara; Gaby Espino; Pablo Montero
- Opening theme: "Rebeca" by Mijares
- Ending theme: "Rebeca" by Mijares
- Countries of origin: Venezuela; United States
- Original language: Spanish
- No. of episodes: 150

Production
- Executive producer: Alfredo Schwarz
- Production location: Miami
- Cinematography: Eduardo Dávila; Reinaldo Figueira
- Running time: 45 minutes
- Production company: Venevisión

Original release
- Network: Venevisión; Univision
- Release: June 3 – December 27, 2003

Related
- Gata salvaje; Ángel Rebelde

Rebeca is a 2003 Spanish-language telenovela produced by Venevisión International. The telenovela was written by Alberto Gómez and stars Mariana Seoane and Ricardo Álamo as the main protagonists with Gaby Espino portraying the main antagonist.

== Plot ==
Rebeca Linares (Mariana Seoane) is a young, hard-working woman who lives in Miami with Matilde, her mother and her two sisters, Niurka and Patty. In order to be able to support her family and her ailing mother, she has two jobs working at a food delivery shop at the local market and a cleaner at a car dealership. At night, she studies in order to achieve her dream of becoming a teacher.

One day while in a hurry to make a delivery, she has an accident where she crashes her delivery truck against the car of rich billionaire playboy Eduardo Montalban (Ricardo Álamo). It is through this chance encounter that a romance develops between them, although Eduardo is being pressured to marry his rich girlfriend Princesa (Gaby Espino), though he isn't serious about settling down.

But Rebeca will also meet Sergio, an older, rich and attractive man who will also fall in love with her. Little does she know that Sergio is Eduardo's father. From this point on, father and son will become enemies to fight for the love of one woman. Martin, Rebeca's neighbor and childhood friend, will also join this love triangle to fight for Rebeca's love, despite the fact that Rebeca only views him as a brother.

Princesa, overcome by jealousy that Eduardo left her for Rebeca, will join forces with Regina, Sergio's sister who is married to Adalberto, Rebeca's biological father who abandoned Matilde while she was pregnant, and Sara, the maid at the Montalban mansion who hides her own terrible secrets. For many years, Sara was secretly in love with Sergio, and they had a brief affair that led to the birth of Carolina (Maite Embil) who is not aware that the house keeper is her real mother. Also, Sara was responsible for the death of Sergio's wife.

== Cast ==
- Mariana Seoane - Rebeca Linares
- Ricardo Álamo - Eduardo Montalbán
- Gaby Espino - Princesa Izaguirre. Villain, hates Rebeca, loves Eduardo, then Martín, becomes good at the end of the story
- Pablo Montero - Martín García
- Katie Barberi - Regina Montalbán de Santander. Villain, hates Rebeca and Matilde, Tony's lover, wanted to kill him, killed Herminia Lopez, shot and killed by Natalio
- Elluz Peraza - Sara Santos. Villain, killed Marcela, loves Sergio, hates Rebeca. Ends up insane asylum, dies burned in the mental sanatorium fire in the same way she killed Marcela.
- Pablo Martín - Tony Izaguirre. Villain, lover of Estefania, Regina and Paty, wants Rebeca, killed Patty's unborn baby, killed by Veronica
- Eduardo Rodríguez - León Valverde. Villain, tried to kill Niurka, attempted to rape Gisella, kidnaps Gisela and Eduardo, killed by the police
- Adolfo Cubas - Natalio Gil. Villain, in love with Niurka, rapes her, ends up in jail
- Patty Alvarez - Leona Valverde. Villain, hates Niurka, wants to kill her, ends up in jail
- Ana Karina Casanova - Verónica Zaldivar. Villain, stoles Sergio's money, Tony's killer, killed by Sara
- Víctor Cámara - Sergio Montalbán
- Ana Patricia Rojo - Niurka Linares
- Susana Dosamantes - Matilde Linares
- Jorge Luis Pila - Nicolás Izaguirre
- Maite Embil - Carolina Montalbán de Izzaguire
- Leonardo Daniel - Adalberto Santander
- Adrian Delgado - Liborio Gil
- Anna Silvetti - Dionisia Pérez
- Elaiza Gil - Arcoiris Ponce/Sirena Ponce
- Griselda Noguera - Petra Gil
- Jacqueline García - Violeta Pérez
- Yina Vélez - Estefanía Dóriga, Princessa Best Friend, Villain, in love with Tony
- Mariam Valero - Zaida Díaz
- Cherrilyn Silva - Zafiro
- Zhandra de Abreu - Patty Linares
- Arianna Coltellaci - Alicia Tejera
- Marjorie de Sousa - Gisela Gidalva, Rebeca best friend.In Love with Eduardo
- Tatiana Capote - Amanda Gidalva/Marcela Montalbán
- Riczabeth Sovalbarro - Elena 'Elenita' Zaldivar
- César Román - Beto García
- Julio Capote - Padre Alfredo
- Roberto Avellanet - Arturo
- Dayana Garroz - Marlene
