= Engañada =

Television series

- Also known as: Marcada por el destino
- Genre: Telenovela; Romance; Drama
- Created by: Vivel Nouel
- Written by: Vivel Nouel; Benilde Ávila
- Directed by: César Bolívar; Arquímedes Rivero
- Starring: Verónica Schneider; Jorge Aravena; Desideria De Caro; Karl Hoffman
- Opening theme: "Dime" by Yaire
- Ending theme: "Dime" by Yaire
- Country of origin: Venezuela
- Original language: Spanish
- No. of episodes: 129

Production
- Executive producer: Sandra Rioboo
- Producer: Dayan Coronado
- Production locations: Yaracuy, Hacienda de Santa Teresa de Aragua
- Editors: Antonio Parada; Carlos Garcia
- Running time: 41-44 minutes
- Production company: Venevisión

Original release
- Network: Venevisión
- Release: June 23 – September 12, 2003

Related
- Amor del bueno; Cosita rica

Engañada is a Venezuelan telenovela written by Vivel Nouel and Benilde Ávila which was produced by Venevisión in 2003. The telenovela lasted for 129 episodes and was distributed internationally by Venevisión International.

Verónica Schneider and Jorge Aravena starred as the main protagonists with Desideria De Caro, Karl Hoffman, Carlota Sosa as the antagonists.

The telenovela also aired on Univision in 2003. The exterior shots of the countryside were filmed in at the Parque de la Flora Exótica de Yaracuy and Hacienda de Santa Teresa de Aragua in Venezuela.

== Plot ==
Marisela Ruiz Montero grew up in the countryside with her brave and enterprising mother Rosalinda Ruiz who works in the hacienda "Las Pomarrosas". Rosalinda, though she may appear happy on the outside, hides a secret that concerns Marisela's true paternity. When she was only 17 years old, Rosalinda was deceived by a married man with whom she was in love. When she discovered that she was pregnant, she escaped to the countryside in order to avoid bringing shame to her family. Furthermore, Marisela is the actual heir to an immense fortune.

One day, while walking in the countryside, Marisela meets Gabriel Reyes and they instantly fall in love with each other. What she doesn't know is that Gabriel is her father's godson. She finally comes into contact with her true family, and the title that is rightfully hers, after her aunt changes her will to include the niece that she has been searching for all these years.

However, luck is on Marisela's side. Her aunt's fortune falls into the hands of two ambitious and greedy individuals, Isadora and her fiancé Alvaro, Gabriel's best friend. They succeed in preventing Marisela from receiving her fortune, and also separate her from Gabriel.

Marisela and Gabriel meet again after 20 years, but it is unsure whether they will be able to rekindle their love.

== Cast ==
- Verónica Schneider as Marisela Valderrama Ruiz Montero
- Jorge Aravena as Gabriel Reyes Bustamente
- Dessideria D'Caro as Isadora Valderrama Rengifo
- Karl Hoffman as Alfonso Malavé
- Yanis Chimaras as Fernando Valderrama
- Jorge Palacios as Ignacio / Braulio
- Carlota Sosa as Flavia Rengifo de Valderrama
- Raúl Amundaray as Raúl
- Gigi Zanchetta as Arelys Anselmi
- Eduardo Luna as Diego Núñez
- Alberto Alifa as Reynaldo Cárdenas
- Alejandro Chabán as Daniel Viloria Ruiz Montero
- Ana Corina Milman as Coralito
- Ana Massimo as La Nena Monsalve
- Asdrúbal Blanco as Marcos Blanco
- Astrid Carolina Herrera as Yolanda
- Bebsabe Duque as Nancy
- Caridad Canelón as Aurora Leal
- Carlos Augusto Maldonado as Víctor Manuel Peñaloza
- Carlos Olivier as Miguel Pantoja
- Chelo Rodríguez
- Daniel Elbittar as Ricardo Viloria Ruiz Montero
- Daniela Bascopé as Gabriela Inés Reyes Valderrama
- Estelín Betancor as Laura Rengifo de Ruiz Montero
- Federico Moros as Cristian Pantoja Anselmi
- Fernando Villate
- Gabriel Parisi as Giancarlo Núñez Anzola
- Gabriela Guédez as Diana
- Guadalupe Quintana as Carla
- Janín Barboza as Patricia Anzola
- Javier Rivero as René
- Jhonny Zapata as Eloy Cedeño
- Jimmy Verdum as Percy Pantoja
- Johana Morales as Abril Jiménez
- Josué Villae as Tomás
- Judith Vásquez as Raiza
- Kassandra Topper as Mirna Mogollón
- Luis Manuel Nessy as Rambo
- Luis Pérez Pons as Guillermo
- Luisana Beiloune as Isabella Malavé
- Maritza Bustamante as Jennifer Cárdenas
- Mauricio González as Ramón Jiménez
- Metzly Gallardo as Lourdes Santaella
- Milena Santander as Candela
- Patricia Oliveros as Yajaira
- Pedro Lander as Padre Juan
- Rafael Romero as Jesús Viloria
- Regino Jiménez as Padre Venancio
- Reina Hinojosa as Chela
