= Adrián Delgado =

Venezuelan actor

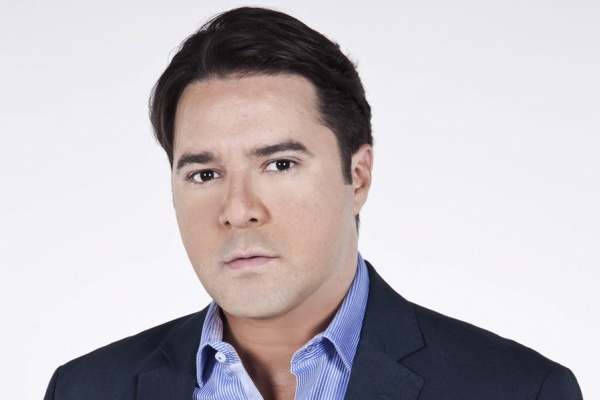
- Born: Adrián Antonio Delgado; May 14, 1977 (age 48); Caracas, Venezuela
- Occupation: Television actor
- Years active: 1997 – present

Adrián Antonio Delgado (born 14 May 1977) In Caracas to Antonio and Yaneida Delgado is a Venezuelan television actor. His stage name is a combination of his parents family names. Delgado has two sisters, one elder and one younger.

== Filmography ==
Year	Title	Character	Company
1997	A todo corazón	Adrián Rodríguez	Venevision
1999	Mujercitas	Juan Bautista	Venevision
2000	Muñeca de trapo	Alejandro	Venevision
2001	Guerra de mujeres	Juan Diego Herrera	Venevision
2002	Las González	Antonio Da Silva	Venevision
2003	Rebeca	Liborio Gil	Venevision
2004	Sabor a ti	Manolo Martínez	Venevision
2005	Se solicita príncipe azul	Luis Carlos Rivas	Venevision
2006	Voltea pa' que te enamores	Aureliano Márquez	Venevision
2008	¿Vieja Yo?	Jose Antonio Martinez	Venevision
2011	Natalia del Mar	Octavio Valladares	Venevision
2013	De Todas Maneras Rosa	Dr. Carlos Arturo Ruiz	Venevision
2014	Solo tu y yo	Comisario Arnaldo	Venevision
2015	A Puro Corazon	Cristobal Ortega	
2017	Para Verte Mejor	Cristobal Andress Blanco	
2023	Intriga Tras Camara	TBA	Quimera Vision

== Teather ==
- CABARET. Teatro Teresa Carreño. 2011
- Hollywood Style. Teatro Celarg 2009
- Hercules. Teatro Sambil 2008
- Una casa pa´Maita. Teatro Teresa Carreño. 2007

== Movies ==
Movie	Character	Director	Year
Reveron	Vicente Gerbasi	Diego Risquez	2011
Miranda Regresa	Mendez	Luis Alberto Lamata	2007
