= Gigi Zanchetta =

Venezuelan actress (born 1967)

- Born: Gigliola Concepción Zanchetta Pirela; April 3, 1966 (age 60); Caracas, Venezuela
- Occupation: Actress
- Years active: 1981–present
- Height: 1.72 m (5 ft 8 in)
- Spouse: Ricardo Mandini
- Children: 1

Gigliola (Gigi) Zanchetta Pirella (born April 3, 1966) is a Venezuelan actress.

== Life and career ==
Zanchetta has made her television debut in the telenovela Cristal; she later specialized in the genre, appearing in over 20 telenovelas, among them Primavera alongside Fernando Carrillo and Cara Sucia. In the mid-1990s she has sparked controversy for being the first Venezuelan celebrity to pose nude for a magazine, appearing in the cover of the Spanish magazine Interviú. She was also active in films and in theatre. Her last telenovela role was in 2012; since then she moved to Spain with her son, leaving the entertainment industry. A former backer of Chavismo and of Nicolás Maduro, she eventually publicly regretted about her support to him and attacked him on various occasions.

== Telenovelas ==
- Cristal (1985)
- Más allá del silencio (1985)
- El Seductor (1986)
- Mansión de luxe (1986)
- La dama de rosa (1986)
- Primavera (1988)
- Alondra (1989)
- El Engaño (1989)
- Inolvidable (1992)
- Cara sucia (1992)
- Dulce enemiga (1995)
- Pecado de amor (1996)
- Contra viento y marea (1997)
- El País de las mujeres (1998)
- Enséñame a querer (1998)
- Toda mujer (1999)
- Hechizo de amor (2000)
- Más que amor, frenesí (2001)
- Mambo y canela (2002)
- Las González (2002)
- Engañada (2003)
- Sabor a ti (2004)
- Los Querendones (2006)
- Te tengo en salsa (2006)
- Natalia del mar (2011)
- Válgame Dios (2012)
