= Josué Villae =

Venezuelan model and actor (born 1975)

- Born: Josué Villae; 17 May 1975 (age 51); Cumaná, Venezuela
- Occupations: Actor, Model

Josué Villae (born 17 May 1975) is a Venezuelan model and actor.

== Career ==
He began his career by participating in several theater plays. He rose to fame by participating in the Mister Venezuela competition in 2000 where he was one of the finalists. Since then, he has participated in various telenovelas on Venezuelan channel Venevisión.

In 2013, Josué joined the cast for the upcoming telenovela Corazón Esmeralda

== Telenovelas ==
Television and Film
Year	Title	Role
2003	Cosita Rica	Guillermo
2003	Engañada	Tomás
2005	El amor las vuelve locas	
2007	Aunque mal paguen	Esteban
2008	Amor Urbano	Adonis
2008	La vida entera	
2010	La Banda	Camilo
2012	Válgame Dios	Ángel
2012	Mi ex me tiene ganas	Santiago Estrada
2014	Corazón Esmeralda	Bruno Álvarez
