= Gaby Espino =

Venezuelan actress and model

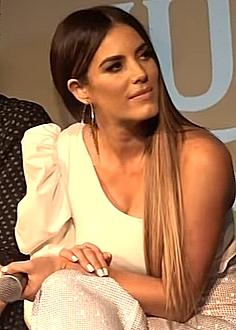
- Espino in 2019
- Born: María Gabriela Espino Rugero; November 15, 1977 (age 48); Caracas, Venezuela
- Occupation: Actress
- Years active: 1996–present
- Spouse: Cristóbal Lander (m. 2007; div. 2011)
- Children: 2

María Gabriela Espino Rugero (born November 15, 1977), better known as Gaby Espino, is a Venezuelan actress. She is best known for her main roles in telenovelas in Venezuela, Colombia and Mexico.

== Early life and career ==
Born in Caracas, Venezuela, Espino is the daughter of a chemical engineer and a publicist. She is of Spanish, Native Venezuelan and Lebanese descent. Her parents divorced when she was young. She is the oldest of five children, she has a sister, Andreina, two paternal half-brothers, Gustavo and Mariano and a maternal half-sister, Nelly.

Due to her fascination with animals, she originally planned to become a veterinarian. She later considered studying dentistry, but changed her mind and began studying public relations, before deciding to become an actress.

== Personal life ==
Espino married Venezuelan actor Cristobal Lander on June 14, 2007. In 2008, they welcomed a daughter.

During the filming of Mas Sabe el Diablo in 2009, Espino was linked to her co-star, Jencarlos Canela. In early 2010, Espino and Lander separated and it was rumored that it was because Canela was dating Espino on the side. Canela and Espino denied this and stated they were just friends.

Espino reconciled with Lander in November 2010, but they later divorced in March 2011 and once again rumors suggested that Canela and Espino were dating.

In September 2011, Canela and Espino did a live chat over social networking site Twitter, where they confirmed they were in relationship and announced that they were expecting their first child together. The godparents are Cristina Saralegui and Pitbull. Espino gave birth to their son in 2012. On August 26, 2014, both Canela and Espino confirmed on their official Facebook page that they have decided to put an end to their relationship.

== Filmography ==
=== Films ===
List of appearances and roles in feature films
Year	Title	Role	Notes
2005	La mujer de mi hermano	Laura / Lara	Debut film
2006	Elipsis	Leonora Duque	
2010	Más sabe el diablo: El primer golpe	Manuela Dávila	Sequel to telenovela
2015	Desaparecer	Herself	
2015	Lusers, los amigos no se eligen	Angie	
2018	¡He matado a mi marido!	Viviana	
2021	No es lo que parece	Adriana	
2022	Cuarentones	Naomi	

=== Television ===
List of appearances in television series and specials
Year	Title	Role	Notes
1995–1996	Nubeluz	Host / Dalina	Venezuelan Season
1997	A todo corazón	Natalia	
1999	Enamorada	Ivana Robles	
2000	Amantes de Luna Llena	Abril Cárdenas	
2001	Guerra de mujeres	Yubirí Gamboa	
2002	Las González	Alelí González	
2003	Rebeca	Princesa Izaguirre Zabaleta	
2004	Luna, la heredera	Luna Mendoza	Main role
2005–2006	Se solicita príncipe azul	María Carlota Rivas	
2006–2007	Mundo de fieras	Mariángela Cruz	
2007	Sin vergüenza	Renata Sepúlveda	
2008–2009	El Rostro de Analía	Mariana Andrade / Ana Lucía "Analía" Moncada	Short participation
2009–2010	Más sabe el diablo	Manuela Dávila	Main role; 182 episodes
2010	Ojo por ojo	Alina Jericó de Monsalve	
2011	Confesiones de novela	Herself	
2013–2014	Santa Diabla	Amanda Braun / Santa Martínez	Main role; 136 episodes
2016–2018	Señora Acero	Indira Cárdenas	Series regular (seasons 3–4); 118 episodes
2019	Jugar con fuego	Camila Peláez de Miller	Main role; 10 episodes
2019	Miss Universe 2019	Herself	1 episode
2019	Betty en NY	Herself	1 episode
2021	La suerte de Loli	Paulina Castro	Main role; 103 episodes
2022	El rey, Vicente Fernández	Verónica Landín	Recurring role; 26 episodes
2024	El juego de las llaves	Olivia	Main role (season 3)
2024	Ahora que no estás	Paloma Sáez	
2026	El precio de la fama	Renata Lezama	Guest star

== Awards and nominations ==
Year	Award	Category	Works	Result
2012	Premios Tu Mundo	#MostSocial	Herself	Won
2013	Premios Tu Mundo	I’m Sexy and I Know It	Herself	Won
2013	Premios Tu Mundo	Favorite Award of the Night	Herself	Won
2013	Premios People en Español	Best Actress	Santa Diabla	Nominated
2013	Premios People en Español	Couple of the Year (with Aarón Díaz)	Santa Diabla	Nominated
