= The Beauty of the Alhambra =

1989 film

- Film poster
- Directed by: Enrique Pineda Barnet
- Written by: Enrique Pineda Barnet
- Starring: Beatriz Valdés
- Release date: December 1989
- Running time: 108 minutes
- Country: Cuba
- Language: Spanish

The Beauty of the Alhambra (Spanish: La bella del Alhambra) is a 1989 Cuban drama film directed by Enrique Pineda Barnet. The film was selected as the Cuban entry for the Best Foreign Language Film at the 63rd Academy Awards, but was not accepted as a nominee.

== Cast ==
- Beatriz Valdés as Rachel
- Omar Valdés as Federico
- César Évora as Amante Rachel
- Carlos Cruz as Adolfito
- Isabel Moreno as La mejicana
- Jorge Martínez as Jorge

== See also ==
- List of Cuban films
- List of submissions to the 63rd Academy Awards for Best Foreign Language Film
- List of Cuban submissions for the Academy Award for Best Foreign Language Film
