= Enamorada (1986 TV series) =

- Genre: Telenovela
- Written by: Maryan Escalona
- Directed by: Renato Gutierrez
- Starring: Sully Diaz; Carlos Olivier; Ruddy Rodríguez; Cristián Reyes
- Opening theme: "Ojos negros (Occhi neri)" by Ricardo Montaner
- Country of origin: Venezuela
- Original language: Spanish
- No. of episodes: 150

Production
- Executive producer: Carlos Suarez

Original release
- Network: Venevisión
- Release: March 1986 – September 1986

Related
- Cantaré para tí; El sol sale para todos

Enamorada is a 1986 Venezuelan telenovela produced and broadcast by Venevisión. The telenovela starred Puerto Rican actress Sully Diaz and Venezuelan actor Carlos Olivier.

== Cast ==
- Sully Diaz
- Carlos Olivier
- Ruddy Rodríguez
- Cristián Reyes
- Manuel Escolano
- Ernesto Balzi
