= Nohely Arteaga =

Venezuelan actress (born 1963)

- Born: Nohely Coromoto González Arteaga; December 5, 1963 (age 62); Caracas, Venezuela
- Occupations: Actress; Model
- Years active: 1983–present
- Spouses: Oscar Abad; Hernan Perez Pereira
- Children: 2

Nohely Coromoto González Arteaga (born December 5, 1963) is a Venezuelan actress recognized internationally for her starring roles in telenovelas during the 1980s and 1990s.

== Filmography ==
=== Telenovelas ===
- María Laura (1983) - RCTV
- Chao, Cristina (1983) - RCTV
- La Salvaje (1983) - RCTV
- Leonela (1983 - 1984) - RCTV
- Azucena (1984) - RCTV
- Topacio (1984 - 1985) - RCTV
- Atrévete (1986) - RCTV
- Tu mundo y el mío (1987) - Crustel S.A. (Argentina)
- Alma mía (1989) - RCTV
- Emperatriz (1990) - Marte Televisión
- La traidora (1991) - Marte Televisión (first Spanish telenovela aired in the Philippines in RPN 9)
- Las dos Dianas (1992) - Marte Televisión
- Pedacito de Cielo (1993) - Marte Televisión
- El paseo de la gracia de Dios (1993) - Marte Televisión
- Cruz de nadie (1994) - Marte Televisión
- Samantha (1998) - Venevisión
- El País de las mujeres (1998) - Venevisión
- Amantes de luna llena (2000) - Venevisión
- Guerra de mujeres (2001) - Venevisión
- Las González (2002) - Venevisión
- Cosita Rica (2003) - Venevisión
- El amor las vuelve locas (2005) - Venevisión
- Ciudad Bendita (2006) - Venevisión
- Toda una dama (2008) Imperio Laya - RCTV Internacional
- Tomasa Tequiero (2009) - Venevisión
- El árbol de Gabriel (2011) - Venevisión
- De todas maneras Rosa (2013) - Venevisión
- Entre tu amor y mi amor (2016)
