= Montané =

Montané is a surname which may refer to:

- Carlos Montané (1901–1964), Chilean politician and ambassador to Mexico
- Francisco Montané (1878–?), Chilean politician
- Jacques-Bernard-Marie Montané (1751–after 1805), president of the Revolutionary Tribunal in 1793 during the French Revolution and president at the trial of Charlotte Corday
- Joaquín Montané (1901–1982), Spanish footballer
- Josefina Montané (born 1988), Chilean model and television actress
- Luis Montané Dardé (1849–1936), Cuban physician, anthropologist and writer

== See also ==
- Montañés (surname)
