= Beatriz Valdés =

Cuban-Venezuelan actress (born 1963)

Beatriz Valdés Fidalgo (born May 12, 1963, in Havana) is a Cuban-Venezuelan actress.

She was born in Cuba, where she studied drama and worked as an actress before she arrived to Venezuela as a guest at the Cinema Interamerican Forum in 1989. She gave birth to her first child there in 1991.

== Filmography ==
=== Soap operas ===
- 100 días para enamorarnos (2020)
- Mi familia perfecta (2018)
- Santa Diabla (2013)
- Válgame Dios (2012)
- La mujer perfecta (2010)
- La vida entera (2008)
- Arroz con leche (2008)
- Ciudad bendita (2006–2007)
- El amor las vuelve locas (2005)
- Cosita rica (2003)
- Las González (2002)
- Guerra de mujeres (2001)
- Amantes de Luna Llena (2000)
- Luisa Fernanda (1999)
- Reina de corazones (1998)
- Cambio de piel (1998)
- Volver a vivir (1996)
- El paseo de la gracia de Dios (1993)
- Piel (1992)
- Algo más que soñar (1984)

=== Films ===
- Azul y no tan rosa (2013)
- Perfecto amor equivocado (2004)
- Amor en concreto (2003)
- Manuela Sáenz (2000)
- 100 años de perdón (1998)
- La voz del corazón (1997)
- La bella del Alhambra (1989)
- Hoy como ayer (1987)
- Capablanca (1987)
- Como la vida misma (1987)
- Lejanía (1985)
- Los pájaros tirándole a la escopeta (1982)
- Una nueva criatura (1970)
