= Guerra de mujeres =

Television series

- Genre: Telenovela; Romance; Drama
- Created by: César Miguel Rondon; Monica Montañés
- Directed by: Román Chalbaud; Arquímedes Rivero
- Starring: Gaby Espino; Jorge Reyes; Adrián Delgado; Mimi Lazo
- Opening theme: El Día de mi Suerte by Roberto Blades
- Country of origin: Venezuela
- Original language: Spanish
- No. of episodes: 141

Production
- Executive producer: Consuelo Delgado
- Producer: Carolina de Jacovo
- Production location: Caracas
- Editors: Omar Sabino; Mario Scata
- Running time: 41-44 minutes
- Production company: Venevisión

Original release
- Network: Venevisión
- Release: August 12, 2001 – February 19, 2002

Guerra de mujeres (English title: War of the women) is a Venezuelan telenovela written by César Miguel Rondon and Monica Montañés, and it was produced by Venevisión in 2001.

Gaby Espino, Jorge Reyes and Mimí Lazo starred as the main protagonists.

== Plot ==
Yubiri is a young woman with dreams of having a successful career and meeting the man of her dreams, but she still doesn't know how she will achieve all this. Through a visit to a fortune teller, she is told that on the same night at 12 midnight, she will finally meet her lover. However, the fortune teller's premonition is fulfilled, twice. Yubiri will meet Wilker, a young singer full of life and eager to conquer the world. At the same time, Juan Diego, a young man who has secretly been attracted to her, will appear in her life.

Guerra de mujeres is a story about women who are in a constant fight to achieve their goals and dreams while always being guided by love.

== Cast ==
- Gaby Espino as Yubirí Gamboa
- Jorge Reyes as Wilker Antonio
- Adrián Delgado as Juan Diego Herrera
- Mimí Lazo as Brígida "Brigitte" de Bonilla
- Caridad Canelón as Bienvenida de Gamboa
- Daniel Alvarado as Junior Bonilla
- Nohely Arteaga as Ana
- Aroldo Betancourt as Olegario
- Beatriz Valdés as Gisela
- Milena Santander as Fina "Finita" Rincón de Botero
- Lourdes Valera as Dolores "Lolita"
- Roberto Lamarca as Fabián Botero
- Henry Galué as Mauricio Villone
- Fernando Villate as Kowalsky
- Carlos Mata as Atanasio Herrera
- Víctor Cámara as Armando
- Eva Blanco as Dionisia
- José Oliva as Primero
- Elaiza Gil as Xiolimar
- Marjorie De Sousa as Carolina Bonilla
- Ramón Hinojosa
- Beba Rojas as Graciela Gamboa
- Denise Novell as Natalia
- Liorvis Sivira as Segundo
- Yeinar Moreno as Jessica
- José Zambrano as Felix
- Yanín Barboza as Clarissa
- José Luis Zuleta as Segundo
- Reinaldo José Pérez as Pastor
- María Antonieta Duque as Blanquita
- Asdrúbal Blanco as Javier
- Wilmer Machado as Pipo
- Gustavo Wassermann as Barman
- Josué Villae as Alberto
- Samantha Suárez as Mayerlin
- Michelle Nassef as Corina Botero Rincon
- Auremily Romero as Marina Botero Rincon
- Adrián Durán as Carlitos
- Juan Franquiz as Melendez
- Irene Clemente as Margot
- Annaliesse Suegart as Yolanda
- Alfredo Naranjo
