= Amantes de luna llena =

Television series

- Genre: Telenovela; Romance; Drama
- Created by: Leonardo Padrón
- Written by: Leonardo Padrón; Doris Seguí; Mariana Reyes; Indira Páez
- Directed by: César Bolívar; Román Chalbaud; Luis Manzo; Carlos Izquierdo
- Starring: Ruddy Rodríguez; Diego Bertie; Astrid Carolina Herrera; Carlos Mata; Beatriz Valdés; Jorge Cao
- Theme music composer: Bebu Silvetti
- Opening theme: Cada quien con cada cual by Ricardo Montaner
- Country of origin: Venezuela
- Original language: Spanish
- No. of episodes: 171

Production
- Executive producer: Consuelo Delgado
- Producers: Dayan Coronado; Henry Ramos
- Production location: Venezuela
- Editors: Omar Sabino; Orlando Manzo
- Running time: 44 minutes
- Production company: Venevisión

Original release
- Network: Venevisión
- Release: 22 August 2000 – 26 March 2001

Related
- Hechizo de Amor

Amantes de luna llena (English title: Full Moon Lovers) is a Venezuelan telenovela written by Leonardo Padrón and produced by Venevisión in 2000.

On August 22, 2000, Venevisión started broadcasting Amantes de luna llena weekdays at 9:00pm, replacing Hechizo de amor. The last episode was broadcast on March 26, 2001.

Ruddy Rodríguez and Diego Bertie starred as the main protagonists while Beatriz Valdés and Jorge Cao starred as antagonists, with special participation of Gianella Neyra.

== Plot ==
Simón Luna is a tourist guide responsible for taking vacationers to some of the most exotic locations in Venezuela. Rumors of his skill as a lover have also been spreading around his hometown. Notably, Simón has never truly fallen in love with any woman. This changes when he meets Camila Rigores, daughter of Leon Rigores, owner of the biggest hotel in the capital city. Camila has returned to Venezuela with the aim of managing her father's hotel, El Durado and revitalizing the tourism industry in the country.

However, a tragedy occurs when her sister Isabel commits suicide due to unrequited love. In order to avenge her sister's death, Camila begins the search for the man that led her sister to commit suicide, and that man is none other than Simón. Camila draws out her plan for vengeance: she will seduce Simón and make him fall in love with her.

Simón, who is unaware of Isabel's death, will be greatly affected by the appearance of Camila into his life and in one of the most impressive locations of nature in Venezuela. Camila makes Simón her business partner, and the two will begin the game of seduction that will ruin both of them.

== Cast ==
- Ruddy Rodríguez as Camila Rigores
- Diego Bertie as Simón Luna
- Astrid Carolina Herrera as La Perla
- Carlos Mata as Alejandro Linares
- Juan Carlos Vivas as El Siete
- Gaby Espino as Abril Cárdenas
- Nohely Arteaga as Micaela Lugo
- Rosalinda Serfaty as Valentina Linares
- Daniel Alvarado as Tony Calcaño
- Fabiola Colmenares as María Celeste "La Vikinga"
- Pablo Martín as Ruben Sucre
- Carlota Sosa as Renata Cárdenas
- Aroldo Betancourt as Facundo Montoya
- Lourdes Valera as Lupita Madera
- Milena Santander as Tata Calcaño
- Kiara as Lorena Santamaría
- Beatriz Valdés as Sol Rigores
- Jorge Cao as León Rigores
- Ana Karina Manco as Chocolate
- Yanis Chimaras as Lucho Cárdenas
- Elisa Escámez as Custodia
- Roberto Lamarca as Troconis
- Adolfo Cubas as Macedonio
- Johanna Morales as Ximena
- Elaiza Gil as Rebeca
- Luis Gerónimo Abreu as Cristóbal
- Fernando Villate as Juan Chiquito
- Eva Moreno as Cruz María
- Isabel Moreno as Angustia
- Haydée Balza as Rosita Mérida
- Francisco Ferrari as Hipólito Linares
- Beatriz Vásquez as Meche Peralta
- Javier Varcarser as Kico
- Isabel Herrera as Trinidad
- Andreína Yépez as Tobago
- Carmen Manrique as Maruja
- Samantha Suárez as Carolina Linares
- Christina Dieckmann as Bárbara
- María Antonieta Duque as Angélica
- Marjorie de Sousa as Mayra
- Gianella Neyra as Isabel Rigores
