= Se solicita príncipe azul =

Venezuelan telenovela (2005-2006)

- Genre: Telenovela
- Created by: Indira Páez
- Written by: Elio Palencia; Manuel Mendoza; Amarís Páez
- Directed by: Luis Alberto Lamata; Arquímedes Rivero; Omar Hurtado; Édgar Liendo
- Creative director: Luc De Paredes
- Starring: Gaby Espino; Rafael Novoa; Daniela Alvarado; Adrián Delgado; Carlos Cruz; Andrés Suárez; Raúl Amundaray
- Music by: Miguel Mardeni
- Opening theme: "Príncipe azul" by Frank Quintero
- Country of origin: Venezuela
- Original language: Spanish
- No. of episodes: 140

Production
- Executive producer: Consuelo Delgado
- Producer: Cristóbal Barberena
- Production location: Caracas
- Cinematography: Johnny Febles
- Editor: Carlos Ortega
- Camera setup: Multi-camera
- Running time: 43 minutes

Original release
- Network: Venevisión
- Release: July 20, 2005 – February 13, 2006

Related
- El amor las vuelve locas; Los Querendones

Se solicita príncipe azul (Prince Charming Wanted) is a 2005 Venezuelan telenovela produced by Venevisión. The telenovela is an original story by Venezuelan playwright Indira Páez. Gaby Espino, Rafael Novoa, Daniela Alvarado, and Adrián Delgado starred as the main protagonists.

== Plot ==
Maria Carlota and Maria Corina are two beautiful, strong-willed cousins who are the granddaughters of Pastor Palmieri, owner of a successful cattle ranch in the countryside. The two cousins have very different personalities, but both of them are tired of being deceived by men. Maria Carlota lives with her grandfather taking care of the ranch and the cattle where she enjoys the fields and rural, small-town life. At the same time, Maria Corina is a popular socialite in the city where she cannot dream of living anywhere else.

Maria Carlota has grown up under the influence of her three brothers, children of her father's first wife. The Rivas brothers are known all over town for their love affairs and infidelities, and they have taught her to beware of love at all costs. But this perception will change for her when she meets Ricardo, a handsome lawyer with two children who live in the sadness of his failed marriage to a cruel and selfish woman.

Maria Corina is engaged to be married to Joaquín Pérez Luna. But after witnessing his betrayal with another woman, Maria Corina moves to her grandfather's cattle estate in the countryside. There, she will meet and fall in love with Luís Carlos, Maria Carlota's half-brother. Luís Carlos, who is rough, rude and country lover, will awaken in Maria Corina intense feelings of passion that will make her change her perception about living in the country.

These two young cousins will discover that the prince of their dreams does exist in real life, but not as they would typically dream him to be.

== Cast ==
- Gaby Espino as Maria Carlota Rivas
- Rafael Novoa as Ricardo Izaguirre
- Daniela Alvarado as Maria Corina Palmieri
- Adrián Delgado as Luís Carlos Rivas
- Raúl Amundaray as Aquiles Pérez Luna
- Estelin Betancor as Corina Palmieri
- Caridad Canelón as India Pacheco
- Carlos Cruz as Santiago Pacheco
- Christina Dieckmann as Victoria
- Guillermo Ferrán as Pastor Palmieri
- Melena Gonzáles as Gloria
- Mauricio Gonzáles as Alcalde
- Juan De Dios Jiménes as Sebastián Izaguirre
- Martín Lantigua as Padre Dativo
- Eduardo Luna as Padre Acacio
- Carlos Augusto Maldonado as Damián
- Liliana Meléndez as Claudia
- Eva Mondolfi as Trinita Pérez Luna
- Zair Montes as Petrica
- Verónica Ortiz as Rebeca
- Jorge Palacios as Federico del Valle
- Carolina Perpetuo as Dalia
- Rafael Romero as Agustín Rivas
- Yván Romero as Manaure
- Patricia Schwarzgruber as Alejandra Izaguirre
- Andres Suarez as Joaquín Pérez
- Kassandra Topper as Elizabeth
- Lourdes Valera as Miriam Rondon
- Roque Valero as Bautista
- Sonia Villamizar as Karina Valiente
- Franklin Virgüez as Ángel Rivas
- Jose Luís Zuleta as José Ramón Perdomo
- Susana Bonavides as Pasión
- Vicente Tepedino - Leonardo Pimentel
