= Ciudad bendita =

Venezuelan telenovela

- Title card
- Genre: Telenovela
- Created by: Leonardo Padrón
- Screenplay by: Camilo Hernández; Mariana Reyes; Doris Seguí
- Directed by: Fabio Velásquez; Sergio Martínez; César Bolívar; Édgar Liendo
- Creative director: Yvo Hernández
- Starring: Marisa Román; Roque Valero
- Music by: Pablo Escalona; Víctor Escalona
- Opening theme: "Ciudad Bendita" by Roque Valero
- Country of origin: Venezuela
- Original language: Spanish
- No. of episodes: 214

Production
- Executive producer: Carolina De Jacobo
- Producers: Juan Carlos Farfán; Damaris Padilla; Jesús Gavidia; Wilfredo Mast; Ángel Ruiz
- Production location: Caracas
- Cinematography: José Pérez
- Editors: Antonio Parada; Orlando Manzo; Juan Silva
- Camera setup: Multi-camera

Original release
- Network: Venevisión
- Release: July 25, 2006 – April 4, 2007

Related
- Los Querendones; Voltea pa' que te enamores

Ciudad Bendita is a Venezuelan telenovela produced and broadcast by Venevisión and distributed internationally by Venevisión International. The telenovela is an original story written by Leonardo Padrón.

Marisa Román and Roque Valero star as the main protagonists. Since January 9, 2012, the telenovela has aired in Venezuela through cable channel Venevision Plus to repeated 4pm at 11:30 pm. It is considered a most successful telenovela written by Leonardo Padrón, after Cosita rica.

== Plot ==
Set in the heat of a popular market, Ciudad Bendita tells the love story between two peddlers, two losers, two ordinary people, as anonymous as any. Bendita Sanchez has a detail that obscures her beauty: a limp. On a bus trip back to Caracas she meets Juan Lobo, an ugly man that dreams of becoming a musician, and he instantly falls in love with her.

However, Bendita happens to love another: Yunior Mercado, a metrosexual playboy, and only views Juan Lobo as a friend despite his composing of various songs to win her favor.

Ciudad Bendita is a tribute to unrequited love, as well as the story of a country, a people, an entire community living on poverty, and a handful of survivors who dream of learning the key to happiness in the muddy streets of a Latin American city

== Cast ==
=== Starring ===
- Marisa Román as Bendita Sánchez
- Roque Valero as Juan Lobo

=== Also starring ===
- Juan Carlos García as Yúnior Mercado
- Alba Roversi as María "Maga" Gabriela
- Nohely Arteaga as Magaly de Mercado / Doble M
- Gledys Ibarra as Mercedes Zuleta / La Diabla
- Yanis Chimaras as Guaicaipuro Mercado / Puro
- Beatriz Valdés as Trina de Palacios
- Caridad Canelón as Peregrina de Lobo
- Henry Soto as Kike "Kikin" Palacios
- Carlos Cruz as Baldomero Sánchez
- Carlota Sosa as Julia Barrios de Venturini
- Lourdes Valera as Francisca
- Luis Gerónimo Abreu as Jorge Venturini / Grillo
- Milena Santander as Prudencia Barrios
- Guillermo Dávila as Macario
- Manuel Salazar as Rotundo Quiñones
- Daniela Bascopé as Fedora Palacios
- Elaiza Gil as Mi Alma
- Ana María Simón as Mediática
- Andreína Yépez as Zulay Montiel Barranco
- Alejandro Corona as Etcétera
- Jessica Grau as Marugenia "Maru" Torrealba
- Yván Romero as Kenny G
- María Cristina Lozada as Consuelo
- Carlos Villamizar as Robinson Sánchez
- Freddy Galavís as Ismael Lobo
- Mirtha Borges as Bertha
- Pedro Durán as Cafecito
- Humberto García as Fausto
- Martín Lantigua as Tobías
- Jean Paul Leroux as Jerry Colón
- Anastasia Mazzone as Kimberly Mercado
- Laureano Olivares as Julio Augusto Sánchez
- Susej Vera as Valentina
- Josemith Bermúdez as Tiki
- Antonio Delli as Gonzalo Venturini
- Erika Pacheco as Vera
- Adriana Romero as Yamilé
- Paula Woyzechowsky as Rosita
- David Garcés as Ricardo
- Simón Rojas as Cheo

=== Special participation ===
- Carlos Montilla as Darwin Manuel

=== Special guest stars ===
- Sandra Hernández
- José Luis Zuleta
