= Carlota Sosa =

Spanish-born Venezuelan actress (born 1957)

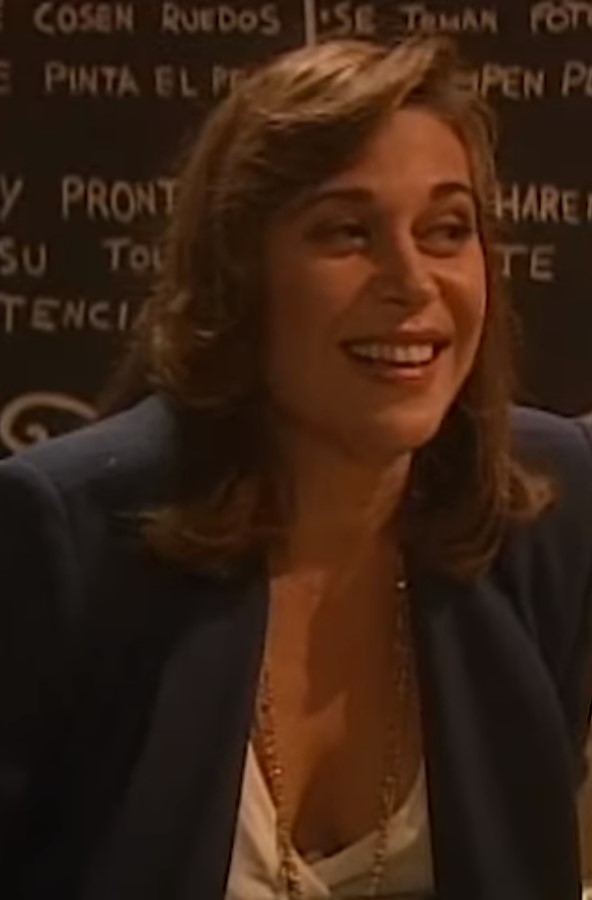
- Born: Carlota Sosa Pietri; February 21, 1957 (age 69); Madrid, Spain
- Occupation: Actress
- Spouse: Rafael Romero

Carlota Sosa Pietri (born 21 February 1957) is a Spanish-born Venezuelan actress known for her participation in various RCTV and Venevisión telenovelas. She is currently married to fellow actor Rafael Romero.

== Filmography ==
Film roles
Year	Title	Roles	Note
2026	The Smoking Fish	TBA	
2016	Tamara	Professor Avelino	
1991	Señora Bolero	Amanda Contreras	

Television
Year	Title	Role
1980	1810	debut
1981	La Cenicienta	Emperatriz
1982	Pecado de una madre	
1984	La mujer sin rostro	
1984	La Dueña	Maria Consuelo
1986	La dama de rosa	Amparo
1987	Primavera	
1989	Rubí rebelde	Carmela
1990	Gardenia	Yolanda Urbaneja
1996	Volver a Vivir	Miranda Kowalski
1998	Aunque me Cueste la Vida	Blanca
2000	Amantes de Luna Llena	Renata Cardenas
2002	Lejana como el viento	Mercedes
2003	Engañada	Flavia Rengifo de Valderrama
2005	Amantes	Eugenia Sarmiento
2006	Ciudad Bendita	Julia Barrios de Venturini
2008	¿Vieja Yo?	Josefina Garcia Bellini
2009	Un Esposo para Estela	Ricarda Roldan de Noriega
2011	Los pájaros se van con la muerte	The Mother
2012	Válgame Dios	Marbelis Rodríguez de Castillo
2016	Entre tu amor y mi amor	Reina Caicedo de Monserrat
