= Las González =

Television series

- Genre: Telenovela; Romance
- Created by: Cesar Miguel Rondòn; Mònica Montañez
- Directed by: Arquímides Rivero; Román Chalbaud
- Starring: Gaby Espino; Jorge Reyes; Adrián Delgado; Alba Roversi; Víctor Cámara
- Opening theme: Capullito de Aleli by Oscar D'León
- Country of origin: Venezuela
- Original language: Spanish
- No. of episodes: 91

Production
- Executive producer: Consuelo Delgado
- Producer: Carolina De Jacobo
- Production location: Caracas
- Running time: 45 minutes
- Production company: Venevisión

Original release
- Network: Venevisión
- Release: 22 June – 27 November 2002

Las González is a Venezuelan telenovela written by Cesar Miguel Rondòn and Mònica Montañez, and produced by Venevisión in 2002. The series lasted for 91 episodes and was distributed internationally by Venevisión International.

On June 22, 2002, Venevisión started broadcasting Las González weekdays at 9:00 pm with the series airing its final episode on 27 November 2002.

Gaby Espino and Jorge Reyes starred as the main protagonists, accompanied by Adrián Delgado, Alba Roversi and Víctor Cámara.

== Cast ==
- Gaby Espino as Aleli González
- Jorge Reyes as Robinson Gamboa
- Adrián Delgado as Antonio Da Silva
- Alba Roversi as Orquidea González
- Víctor Cámara as Romulo Trigo
- Fabiola Colmenares as Lirio
- Carlos Mata as Cristóbal Rojas
- Gigi Zancheta as Violeta González
- Carlos Olivier as Cayetano Mora
- Caridad Canelón as Hortensia
- Aroldo Betancourt as Próspero
- Beatriz Valdés as Magnolia
- Yanis Chimaras as Américo
- Nohely Arteaga as Camelia González
- Pedro Lander as Walter Piña
- Denise Novell as Gladiola González
- Roberto Lamarca as Otto de Jesús
- Lourdes Valera as Bromelia
- Raúl Amundaray as Ubaldo
- Eva Moreno as Doña Gonzala
- José Luis Zuleta as Ariel
- Elaiza Gil as Jasmin
- Maritza Bustamante as Amapola
- Elizabeth Morales as Trinitaria Pérez
- Beba Rojas as Azalea
- Maria Antonieta Duque as Gardenia
- Beatriz Fuentes as Geranio
- Maria Edilia Rangel as Begoña
- Samantha Suárez as Margarita
- Kimberly Dos Ramos as Petunia
- Michelle Nassef as Rosita
- Adrián Durán as Cayetanito
- Jorge Salas as Romulito
- Mhinniutk Cohelo as Gladiolita
- Jesus Aponte as Yefri
