= Válgame Dios =

- Genre: Telenovela
- Created by: Mónica Montáñez
- Written by: Gerardo Blanco; Mónica Montáñez; Doris Seguí; Ángel del Cerro
- Directed by: José Alcalde
- Starring: Sabrina Seara; Eduardo Orozco; Ricardo Álamo
- Opening theme: "Blanco y negro" by Malú
- Country of origin: Venezuela
- Original language: Spanish
- No. of episodes: 144

Production
- Executive producer: Carolina De Jacobo
- Producers: Francisco De Pasquale; Jesús Gavidia
- Production locations: Caracas, Venezuela
- Running time: 42-45 minutes

Original release
- Network: Venevisión
- Release: March 13 – October 3, 2012

Válgame Dios is a Venezuelan telenovela produced by Carolina de Jacobo for Venevisión.

Sabrina Seara and Eduardo Orozco star as the main protagonists while Ricardo Alamo, Carlota Sosa and Raquel Yanez star as the main antagonists.

From March 13, 2012 to October 3, 2012, Venevisión broadcast ¡Válgame Dios! replacing Natalia del Mar. Official production of Válgame Dios began on November 28, 2011.

The finale episode on Venevisión received a high rating of 63.4% audience share.

== Plot ==
The women in the Lopez clan have suffered a curse that has lasted for 100 years which prevents them from having true love. They always fall in love with two men: one a man who is serious and responsible while the other is an irresponsible scoundrel. As a result of the curse, the women end up choosing the latter option.

Yamilet Lopez (Sabrina Seara), like all the Lopez women, is beautiful, smart, funny, hardworking and caring. She also falls victim to the family curse. On the day of her job interview, she meets two men. Ignacio Castillo (Eduardo Orozco) is a taxi driver and fireman who is sweet, kind and responsible, and Jose Alberto Gamboa (Ricardo Alamo), a mischievous womanizer who has been married for 25 years to Mariela (Gigi Zanchetta), a high school guidance counselor, and has a mistress Dinorah (Flavia Gleske) who he has been seeing for 10 years.

Both men will try to conquer Yamilet's heart. However, she doesn't know who is the good one or who is the bad one.

The Lopez women have hope that the curse can be broken. What they do not know is that it all depends on a secret that Marbelis Castillo (Carlota Sosa) Ignacio's mother knows. Everyone believes that she is a saint, but in reality she is an evil woman that will stop at nothing, even to the extent of killing, to make sure that her secret is not revealed.

== Cast ==
=== Main cast ===
- Sabrina Seara as Yamilet López
- Eduardo Orozco as Ignacio "Nacho" Castillo
- Ricardo Álamo as José Alberto Gamboa

=== Also as main cast ===
- Jean Carlo Simancas as Inocente Castillo
- Flavia Gleske as Dinorah Calcaño
- Gigi Zanchetta as Mariela Campos de Gamboa
- Roberto Messutti as Cayo Castillo Rodríguez
- Rosmeri Marval as Kimberly Castillo Rodríguez
- Estefanía López as Gabriela "Gaby" Gamboa Campos
- Arán de las Casas as Héctor Zubizarrieta
- Raquel Yánez as Nieves Pérez

=== Supporting cast ===
- Carlota Sosa as Marbelis Rodríguez de Castillo
- Beatriz Valdés as Guillermina López
- Virginia Urdaneta as Mércedes Rodriguez
- Aura Rivas as Gumercinda López
- María Cristina Lozada as Eduvigis Martinez
- Judith Vásquez as Luz Moncada
- Juan Carlos Gardié as Jesús "Chuo" Calcaño
- Alejandro Mata as Remberto Pérez
- Pedro Durán as Padre Efrain
- Yuvana Montalvo as Mayerling Torres
- Erick Ronsó as Jefferson José Bracho
- Alexander Da Silva as Remigio Pérez
- Gabriela Santeliz as Andreína
- Anthony Lorusso as Pablo
- Absalom de los Rios as Constantino "Tino" Durán
- Michelle Taurel as Ligia Elena Sarría
- Ever Bastidas as Alberto José Gamboa Campos
- Hernán Iturbe as Joya Uribe
- Franco Purroy as Brad Pitt Sarría

=== Special participation ===
- Luz Marina Peña
- Mayra Moreno
- Thaimar Rodríguez
- Jordán Peña
- Danny Valdivieso
- Daniel Méndez
- Dorian Laya
- Ricardo Zerpa
- Rafael Alcalde
- Viviana Ramos as La Nueva 3° de Gamboa
- María Antonieta Duque as Gloria Zamora
- Elba Escobar as La bruja del maleficio
- Beba Rojas as La peor es nada
- Josué Villae as Ángel
- Claudia La Gatta as Liseth
- José Gabriel Madonia as Augusto "Guto" Vázco

== Venezuela broadcast ==
- Release dates, episode name & length, based on Venevisión's broadcast.

List of Válgame Dios episodes, by broadcast date
| Air date | Number | Episode title | Duration |
|---|---|---|---|
| March 13, 2012 | 001 | "El día en que Yamilet conoció al hombre de su vida...y al que la hará sufrir" | 50 minutes |
| March 14, 2012 | 002 | "La Bruja vio todo...y más" | 43 minutes |
| March 15, 2012 | 003 | "¡Y todo por culpa de un pasticho de berenjena!" | 42 minutes |
| March 16, 2012 | 004 | "Trampa a ritmo de tango" | 42 minutes |
| March 19, 2012 | 005 | "Guillermina descubre una verdad...que es mentira" | 44 minutes |
| March 20, 2012 | 006 | "Las peripecias de José Alberto" | 44 minutes |
| March 21, 2012 | 007 | "La noche en que 10 años de esfuerzo..¡se empasticharon!" | 45 minutes |
| March 22, 2012 | 008 | "Hasta que la muerte, mejor dicho, las madres los separen" | 44 minutes |
| March 23, 2012 | 009 | "El inexpicable portazo de Guillermina" | 43 minutes |
| March 24, 2012 | 010 | "La carta que le faltaba a la increible Marbelis" | 43 minutes |
| March 25, 2012 | 011 | "¿Cómo se le dice a un novio que es...tu hermano?!!!" | 43 minutes |
| March 27, 2012 | 012 | "El descaro de Inocente" | 45 minutes |
| March 29, 2012 | 013 | "Ya a Ignacio nada le cuadra" | 46 minutes |
| March 30, 2012 | 014 | "La inolvidable Marbelis" | 44 minutes |
| April 2, 2012 | 015 | "Preferible la honestidad...aunque duela" | 41 minutes |
| April 3, 2012 | 016 | "La Viuda del Escorpión" | 41 minutes |
| April 4, 2012 | 017 | "La Palabra de una Santa Madre" | 46 minutes |
| April 5, 2012 | 018 | "¿Dónde está José Alberto?" | 43 minutes |
| April 6, 2012 | 019 | "El tecito de Merceditas" | 43 minutes |
| April 11, 2012 | 020 | "La Peor pesadilla de Marbelis" | 40 minutes |
| April 12, 2012 | 021 | "La uno, la dos, la tres¡La Torta!" | 44 minutes |
| April 13, 2012 | 022 | "Por un pelito" | 43 minutes |
| April 14, 2012 | 023 | "El arma de Santa Marbelis" | 45 minutes |
| April 16, 2012 | 024 | "El pecado mortal" | 43 minutes |
| April 17, 2012 | 025 | "El internet lo aguanta todo" | 47 minutes |
| April 18, 2012 | 026 | "Los límites de José Alberto" | 46 minutes |
| April 19, 2012 | 027 | "Seria pecado mortal ¡Si no fuera mentira!" | 46 minutes |
| April 20, 2012 | 028 | "La mujer de su vida...por hoy" | 43 minutes |
| April 21, 2012 | 029 | "Yamilet ya tiene con quien ir a la boda" | 47 minutes |
| April 23, 2012 | 030 | "¡Si Gamboa no va a la boda, Yamilet se muere...y él también!" | 46 minutes |
| April 24, 2012 | 031 | "La rata de las fotocopias..." | 46 minutes |
| April 25, 2012 | 032 | "Sería perfecto, pero...es imposible" | 46 minutes |
| April 26, 2012 | 033 | "La agenda de Gamboa" | 46 minutes |
| April 27, 2012 | 034 | "¿Mentira? ¿Burla? ¿O Amor?" | 45 minutes |
| April 28, 2012 | 035 | "Lo que Guillermina tení años esperando" | 46 minutes |
| May 1, 2012 | 036 | "Los milagros sí pasan...a otras" | 42 minutes |
| May 2, 2012 | 037 | "La llamadita que tumbaríe el plan" | 42 minutes |
| May 3, 2012 | 038 | "La habitatión 505" | 43 minutes |
| May 4, 2012 | 039 | "El morado que creció y creció ¡y creció!" | 42 minutes |
| May 5, 2012 | 040 | "¡El colmo ya!" | 44 minutes |
| May 7, 2012 | 041 | "¡A que no vas a su casa voy!" | 44 minutes |
| May 8, 2012 | 042 | "El único cuerno...¿o seràn varios?" | 44 minutes |
| May 9, 2012 | 043 | "¿Qué te pasa con la López?" | 48 minutes |
| May 10, 2012 | 044 | "Si te digo la verdad...te miento" | 44 minutes |
| May 11, 2012 | 045 | "La inagotable Marbelis" | 44 minutes |
| May 12, 2012 | 046 | "¿Qué hace la Guillermina con un Chúo?" | 44 minutes |
| May 14, 2012 | 047 | "El vestido de novia que faltaba!!!" | 45 minutes |
| May 15, 2012 | 048 | "¡El ponquecito¡" | 41 minutes |
| May 16, 2012 | 049 | "¡El raro divorcio del Jose..!" | 45 minutes |
| May 17, 2012 | 050 | "¿Imposible Cómo?" | 42 minutes |
| May 18, 2012 | 051 | "El problemita" | 43 minutes |
| May 19, 2012 | 052 | "El día más esperado" | 42 minutes |
| May 21, 2012 | 053 | "La boda de Dinorah" | 43 minutes |
| May 22, 2012 | 054 | "Diez años de palabras y hoy...mudo" | 42 minutes |
| May 23, 2012 | 055 | "¿Dónde está La Rata?" | 42 minutes |
| May 24, 2012 | 056 | "El maleficio de las López y la suerte de los muérganos" | 43 minutes |
| May 25, 2012 | 057 | "Si Yamilet supiera!!!" | 46 minutes |
| May 26, 2012 | 058 | "Juntos para siempre..." | 43 minutes |
| May 28, 2012 | 059 | "La Felicidad de unos es la tristeza de otros" | 42 minutes |
| May 29, 2012 | 060 | "La sinceridad de José Alberto" | 44 minutes |
| May 30, 2012 | 061 | "Yamilet lo sabe todo pero..¡pero sigue con Gamboa!" | 44 minutes |
| May 31, 2012 | 062 | "Si el hijo de Nieves no fuera de Ignacio" | 43 minutes |
| June 1, 2012 | 063 | "Los otros hijos de Inocente" | 43 minutes |
| June 4, 2012 | 064 | "¡Cuidado con el policía!" | 43 minutes |
| June 5, 2012 | 065 | "La coartada de Inocente" | 42 minutes |
| June 6, 2012 | 066 | "Yamilet no sólo sabe...¡también dice!" | 43 minutes |
| June 7, 2012 | 067 | "Lo que Ignacio debería saber antes de casarse" | 42 minutes |
| June 8, 2012 | 068 | "La bomba de Ignacio y Nieves...perdón la boda" | 44 minutes |
| June 11, 2012 | 069 | "La despedida" | 42 minutes |
| June 12, 2012 | 070 | "Falsas Esperanzas" | 43 minutes |
| June 13, 2012 | 071 | "El plan de Inocente que Marbelis no sabe...cree él" | 44 minutes |
| June 14, 2012 | 072 | "La santa y boba mujer...que no lo es tanto" | 44 minutes |
| June 15, 2012 | 073 | "Merceditas lo sabe todo" | 44 minutes |
| June 18, 2012 | 074 | "¡Lo de Marbelis con Chúo lo sabe hasta Dios!" | 42 minutes |
| June 19, 2012 | 075 | "El incendio" | 43 minutes |
| June 20, 2012 | 076 | "Se pierden las esperanzas" | 43 minutes |
| June 21, 2012 | 077 | "¿Qué hacía Marbelis en el incendio?" | 43 minutes |
| June 22, 2012 | 078 | "¿Quién le dice que no a su santa madre?" | 45 minutes |
| June 25, 2012 | 079 | "Un policía en el Castillo" | 42 minutes |
| June 26, 2012 | 080 | "El cuento de Chúo" | 42 minutes |
| June 27, 2012 | 081 | "Gamboa no sabe vivir sin estar casado" | 43 minutes |
| June 28, 2012 | 082 | "10 años esperando un sueño ¿y se cumple ahora?" | 44 minutes |
| June 29, 2012 | 083 | "¡Esta vez si es verdad!" | 42 minutes |
| July 2, 2012 | 084 | "¡Otra vez Eulogio!" | 42 minutes |
| July 3, 2012 | 085 | "El hijo de Marbelis" | 42 minutes |
| July 4, 2012 | 086 | "El hijo del Maracucho" | 42 minutes |
| July 6, 2012 | 087 | "La venganza de Dinorita" | 41 minutes |
| July 9, 2012 | 088 | "¡Para mí, tú eres perfecta!" | 41 minutes |
| July 10, 2012 | 089 | "Yamilet no es como Dinorah...¿o sí?" | 42 minutes |
| July 11, 2012 | 090 | "Asumir las consecuencias" | 42 minutes |
| July 12, 2012 | 091 | "La sinvergüenzura de la Santa con el Maracucho" | 42 minutes |
| July 13, 2012 | 092 | "La decisión de Guillermina" | 41 minutes |
| July 16, 2012 | 093 | "¿Qué es lo que pasa con Cayo" | 43 minutes |
| July 18, 2012 | 094 | "El mal trago de Inocente" | 41 minutes |
| July 19, 2012 | 095 | "Lo más lindo que le han dicho a Guillermina" | 43 minutes |
| July 20, 2012 | 096 | "Las maletas de Inocente" | 43 minutes |
| July 23, 2012 | 097 | "A José Alberto le salió un Cayo, y no precisamente el el pie" | 45 minutes |
| July 25, 2012 | 098 | "¿Se va o se queda?" | 43 minutes |
| July 26, 2012 | 099 | "La pesadilla de Nieves" | 43 minutes |
| July 27, 2012 | 100 | "El infarto" | 43 minutes |
| July 30, 2012 | 101 | "Gamboa, el sincero" | 42 minutes |
| July 31, 2012 | 102 | "¡Con él sí vas a ser feliz¡" | 43 minutes |
| August 1, 2012 | 103 | "Más claro...¡el agua!" | 45 minutes |
| August 3, 2012 | 104 | "Gamboa sincero,¿pero con cuál" | 43 minutes |
| August 4, 2012 | 105 | "Un Inocente en manos de una santa ¡susto!" | 39 minutes |
| August 7, 2012 | 106 | "¿Sabes qué? No te creo!" | 42 minutes |
| August 8, 2012 | 107 | "¡Santa desmemoria!" | 43 minutes |
| August 9, 2012 | 108 | "¿Alucinado yo?" | 44 minutes |
| August 10, 2012 | 109 | "Igual que a Mariela...!O más" | 44 minutes |
| August 13, 2012 | 110 | "El padre Efraín cree en santos ¡pero en ésa no!" | 45 minutes |
| August 15, 2012 | 111 | "¿Qué hago con esta mentira?" | 45 minutes |
| August 16, 2012 | 112 | "La tipa que estaba en el pasillo" | 45 minutes |
| August 17, 2012 | 113 | "Pasaron 4 meses y más" | 43 minutes |
| August 20, 2012 | 114 | "El inesperado" | 43 minutes |
| August 21, 2012 | 115 | "Entonces no es mío" | 46 minutes |
| August 22, 2012 | 116 | "Nieves no quiere ser como Santa Marbelis, ya no" | 44 minutes |
| August 23, 2012 | 117 | "La culpa es mía" | 44 minutes |
| August 27, 2012 | 118 | "Mariela ligerita...¡y Cayo oyendo!" | 46 minutes |
| August 28, 2012 | 119 | "No te pido que me perdones" | 44 minutes |
| August 29, 2012 | 120 | "¡Será que me lo explicas!" | 41 minutes |
| August 30, 2012 | 121 | "El cuento del monstruo" | 44 minutes |
| August 31, 2012 | 122 | "¡¿Cómo pudiste...Marbelis?!" | 42 minutes |
| September 3, 2012 | 123 | "La prueba de ADN" | 45 minutes |
| September 4, 2012 | 124 | "El regreso del padre Efraín" | 44 minutes |
| September 5, 2012 | 125 | "El que se queda...¡y el que se va!" | 44 minutes |
| September 6, 2012 | 126 | "¡¿No te vas a casar, hija?!" | 42 minutes |
| September 7, 2012 | 127 | "La Lopecitadesumadre" | 43 minutes |
| September 10, 2012 | 128 | "Ojo por ojo" | 43 minutes |
| September 11, 2012 | 129 | "El otro hombre de mi vida" | 42 minutes |
| September 12, 2012 | 130 | "Doña Guillermina y sus dos amores" | 43 minutes |
| September 13, 2012 | 131 | "¡Válgame Dios!" | 44 minutes |
| September 17, 2012 | 132 | "El atrevimiento de Merceditas" | 44 minutes |
| September 18, 2012 | 133 | "Atrapar a una Santa" | 42 minutes |
| September 19, 2012 | 134 | "Debajo de la matica" | 45 minutes |
| September 20, 2012 | 135 | "Ni una es santa, ni la otra es bruja, pero de que vuelan, vuelan" | 44 minutes |
| September 21, 2012 | 136 | "Humilada, derrotada y esposada" | 43 minutes |
| September 24, 2012 | 137 | "No dejes para mañana, lo que es rico hacer hoy" | 43 minutes |
| September 25, 2012 | 138 | "¡Y se cumplen dos sueños!...O casi" | 46 minutes |
| September 26, 2012 | 139 | "Y serán felices para siempre" | 45 minutes |
| September 27, 2012 | 140 | "El papá de medio país" | 46 minutes |
| September 28, 2012 | 141 | "Lo peor que le podía pasar a Gamboa" | 44 minutes |
| October 1, 2012 | 142 | "La pobre viejita" | 45 minutes |
| October 2, 2012 | 143 | "El sueño de Guillermina" | 43 minutes |
| October 3, 2012 | 144 | "La boda que Santa Marbelis tanto quiso impedir" | 43 minutes |

== Awards ==
=== Premios Inter 2013 ===
Awards and nominations for Válgame Dios
| Category | Nominated | Result |
|---|---|---|
| Best Telenovela | Válgame Dios | Won |
| Best Original Script | Válgame Dios | Won |
| Best Principal Actress | Sabrina Seara | Nominated |
| Best Principal Actor | Ricardo Álamo | Nominated |
| Best Supporting Actor | Jean Carlo Simancas | Nominated |
| Best Female Villain | Carlota Sosa | Won |
| Best Costume | Annick Corro | Won |
| Best Supporting Actress | Rosmery Marval | Nominated |
| Best Supporting Actress | Yuvanna Montalvo | Won |
