= Voltea pa' que te enamores =

2006 Venezuelan telenovela

- Genre: Telenovela; Romance; Drama
- Created by: Monica Montañez
- Written by: Monica Montañez; Elio Palencia; Doris Seguí
- Directed by: Claudio Callao
- Starring: Daniela Alvarado; Jonathan Montenegro; Mimi Lazo; Adrián Delgado
- Opening theme: "Confusion" by Guaco
- Country of origin: Venezuela
- Original language: Spanish
- No. of episodes: 267

Production
- Executive producer: Manuel Federico Fraiz-Grijalba
- Producer: Alejandro Salazar
- Production location: Caracas
- Camera setup: Multi-camera
- Running time: 42-45 minutes
- Production company: Venevisión

Original release
- Network: Venevisión
- Release: 18 September 2006 – 4 September 2007

Related
- Ciudad bendita; Aunque mal paguen; Voltea pa' que te enamores (2015)

Voltea pa' que te enamores ("Turn around so that you fall in love") is a Venezuelan telenovela written by Monica Montañez and produced by Venevisión between 2006 and 2007. The series was distributed internationally by Venevisión International.

Daniela Alvarado and Jonathan Montenegro starred as the main protagonists.

== Plot ==
Dileidy María López is a young woman who makes a living selling newspapers on a corner of a downtown avenue in Caracas. She dreams of becoming an engineer and becoming the girlfriend of Luis Fernando García, a young man she sees everyday when the traffic lights turn red when he passes by the corner where she sells newspapers. One day, Dileidy is invited to a party from the newspaper company she works that’s being hosted by Luis Fernando's family. It is at this party that Dileidy and Luis Fernando meet and fall in love. But the couple will have to face several issues. Luis Fernando is a coveted bachelor with a less formal relationship with Felicita and Tatianita, her best friend. Again, Gladis, Dileidy's mother, is the maid working at Luis Fernando's family home. Gladis is a tough, single mother who has suffered a lot from love, and does not want her daughter to be left alone and cheated by men.

At the same time, in the neighborhood where Dileidy lives, a young man will arrive, Aureliano Márquez. Aureliano has a dark past, which he wants to forget, especially when he meets Dileidy, falls in love with her and will fight to be a better man capable of conquering her. Aureliano will face Luis Fernando for the love of Dileidy.

== Cast ==
=== Main ===
- Daniela Alvarado as Dileidy María López
- Jonathan Montenegro as Luis Fernando García Malavé
- Mimí Lazo as Gladis López
- Adrián Delgado as Aureliano Márquez

=== Supporting ===
- Carolina Perpetuo as María Antonia (La Nena) Cifuentes Vda de Aristiguieta
- Franklin Virgüez as Gabriel "Gabito" Márquez
- Rafael Romero as Gonzalo Malave
- Sonia Villamizar as Pascua "Pascuita" de Guzmán
- Juan Manuel Montesinos as Ramón (Monchito) Guzmán
- María Antonieta Duque as Matilde Sánchez
- Rolando Padilla as Dorotheo "Theo" Ricon
- Elba Escobar as Eglee Malavé de García
- Carlos Mata as Rómulo García
- Raúl Amundaray as José Tadeo Malavé
- Martín Lantigua as Constantino Benítez
- Manuel Escolano as Marco Aurelio Granados
- Anabell Rivero as Betzaida Conde
- Mirtha Pérez as "Nelly de Conde"
- Zair Montes as Feliz "Felicita" Guzmán
- José Luis Useche as Santiago
- Patricia Schwarzgruber as Tatiana "Tatianita" Aristiguieta Cifuentes
- Marisol Matheus as Rosita de Malavé
- Prakriti Maduro as Yeniluz Rincón
- Damián Genovese as Gerson López
- Sindy Lazo as Cristina García Malavé
- Rafael Silva Sperka as Aleisis
- Vanessa Pose as Alegría Guzmán
- Cristian Mcgaffney as Ernesto
- Erika Santiago as Yuraima
- María Fernanda León as María Gracia
- Lisbeth Manrique as María José
- Héctor Zambrano as Héctor
- Luis José Santander as Paco Aristigueta

Violeta Alemán, important venezuelan actress as "Remedios", central figure in "Voltea pa' que t'enamores".
