= Montañés (surname) =

Montañés is a Spanish surname. It can refer to:

- Albert Montañés (born 1980), Spanish former tennis player
- Francesc Montañés (born 1990), Spanish former tennis player and padel coach
- Francisco Montañés (born 1986), Spanish former footballer
- Joaquín Montañés (born 1953), Spanish former footballer
- Juan Martínez Montañés (1568–1649), Spanish sculptor
- Mónica Montañés (born 1966), Venezuelan screenwriter and journalist.
