= Bienvenidos (Venezuelan TV series) =

- Genre: Comedy
- Created by: Miguel Ángel Landa
- Written by: Miguel Ángel Landa; Raúl Zenteno
- Directed by: Miguel Ángel Landa
- Presented by: Miguel Ángel Landa
- Starring: Gustavo González; Koke Corona; Ernesto Cortés; María Antonieta Duque; Gabriela Fleritt; Katherine Pardo; Gustavo Camacho; Isabelina Zapata; Beba Rojas; Julio Gassette; Dayana Landa; Yulika Krausz; Hugo Marquez; Bienvenido Roca; José Luis Useche
- Country of origin: Venezuela
- Original language: Spanish

Production
- Executive producer: Miguel Ángel Landa
- Running time: 60 minutes

Original release
- Network: Venevision (1982-2001); Televen (2001-2002)
- Release: 1982 – 2002

Bienvenidos (Spanish for "Welcome") is a Venezuelan sketch comedy television show. Produced and hosted by Miguel Ángel Landa, the show was produced by Venevisión from 1982 until 2001, when the show moved to Televen for its final season. It has been taped both at Venevisión's studios and on location across Venezuela.

== Premise ==
Aired weekly, Bienvenidos consists of 20 to 25 comic sketches that usually take on couples, homosexuals, doctors and other members of society as the target of their jokes. During its latest years, most of the sketches had a sexual edge to them.

Some of the most popular characters on the show include:

- El Loco Hugo (Koke Corona), a lunatic who likes to flash women
- Manolo, (Gustavo Gonzalez) the Spaniard from Galicia
- Rigoberto (Kike Corona), who has the mentality of a 10-year-old-boy and whose wives always cheat on him, to which he invariably screams, "¡Tú no me quieres!" ("You don't love me!")
- Enrico (Ernesto Cortéz), a gay character that occasionally starts out masculine, but then behaves effeminately and his voice is altered in pitch
- Briagoberto, (Gustavo Gonzalez) a perpetually drunk man
- Nino Frescobaldi (Julio Gassette), a naughty man who wears a bow tie
- Boberto (Julio Gassette), literally "Dumbert", a dim-witted man

Some of the show's more well-known sketches are:

- Ay, Mama: The general idea of the sketch is somebody will make some kind of embarrassing gaffe, to which they will utter, "Ay, Mama!" (Oh, Mother!", similar to the English language saying, Oh, Brother!")
- El Chiste Incomprensible (The incomprehensible Joke): a joke with a double entendre, usually in a sexual connotation.
- Viejo, viejo, viejo, pero bueno, bueno, bueno (Old old old but good good good): a classic joke that still is funny.

Among the many comedians in this show are Landa's daughter Dayana, Ernesto Cortés and María Antonieta Duque. She and Cortez ended up marrying in real life, but they later separated.

Bienvenidos is shown on networks throughout the Spanish-speaking world. One of those networks was Univision in the United States, which carried the program during the 1990s, its Galavision channel also carried re-runs of the program.

== DVD releases ==
Venevision International And Image Entertainment has released several themed collections of sketches from the show on DVD. The titles are:

- Bienvenidos en la playa (Bienvenidos on the Beach)
- Bienvenidos en la alcoba (Bienvenidos in the Bedroom)
- Bienvenidos en el restaurante (Bienvenidos in the Restaurant)
- Lo mejor de Bienvenidos: Sus Personajes (The Best of Bienvenidos: The Characters)
- Bienvenidos en la oficina (Bienvenidos at the Office)

Each title is hosted by Maria Antonieta Duque.

Bienvenidos is similar in format to a Canadian sketch comedy, You Can't Do That on Television, but it is intended for an adult audience.
