= Los Querendones =

Television series

- Genre: Telenovela; Romance
- Created by: Carlos Peréz
- Written by: Carlos Peréz; Benilde Avila; Jorge Lira; Abigail Truchsess
- Directed by: Carlos Izquierdo
- Starring: Fabiola Colmenares; Jorge Reyes; Crisol Carabal; Miguel de León; Juan Carlos Vivas; Carlos Olivier
- Opening theme: Tu y Yo by Calle Ciega; De Que te Vale by Sí Señor
- Country of origin: Venezuela
- Original language: Spanish
- No. of episodes: 145

Production
- Executive producer: Sandra Rioboo
- Producer: Isabel de Acevedo
- Production location: Caracas
- Running time: 45 minutes
- Production company: Venevisión

Original release
- Network: Venevisión
- Release: February 14 – July 28, 2006

Related
- Se solicita príncipe azul; Ciudad bendita

Los querendones (Lit: The Irresistible) is a Venezuelan telenovela created by Carlos Peréz and produced by Venevisión. The telenovela was distributed internationally by Venevisión International under the title Sueño Con Tu Amor (English title: Yearning For Your Love).

On February 14, 2006, Venevisión started broadcasting Los querendones weekdays at 9:00pm, replacing Se solicita príncipe azul. The last episode was broadcast on July 28, with Ciudad bendita replacing it.

Fabiola Colmenares and Jorge Reyes star as the main protagonists, while Crisol Carabal and Miguel de León star as the main antagonists.

== Plot ==
Fe Quintero Ruiz is a Literature teacher who has been best friends with Dr. Gloria Miralles since childhood. While Fe is sweet, sociable and works hard to assist her parents with the household expenses, Gloria is a beautiful, arrogant and cold-hearted millionaire who has everything she could ask for except that she is unhappy and has a deep resentment towards her best friend with whom they affectionately call each other "monster".

One day, Fe falls madly in love with Sergio Grimán, a legal assistant who failed to finish Law school due to several family problems. Gloria's bitterness towards her friend intensifies when her mother Alicia reveals that Fe is her half-sister after she had an affair with Chon, Fe's father who previously worked for them as a chauffeur. Her hatred and envy for her friend grows everyday when she realizes that Fe will have everything that she cannot have: half of her fortune and the love of Sergio, with whom Gloria has also developed an attraction to. She therefore develops a plan to disinherit Fe and steal away the man that she loves. Considering that her late father put a clause in his will that she can only receive her inheritance once she is married, Gloria begins the process of seducing Sergio to steal him away from her friend. The only person who is aware of her plans is Elias Grimán, a handsome young priest who tries to counsel Gloria to find it in her heart and forgive her friend. It is only later that Fr. Elias discovers that the woman Gloria has been talking about in the secrecy of confession is his brother's girlfriend and future fiance, Fe.

While Fe is happy finding the man of her dreams, the mysticism she is interested in and the tarot cards she reads tell her that doom is approaching and threatening to ruin her. She could never guess that her enemy is her friend Gloria.

== Cast ==
=== Main ===
- Fabiola Colmenares as Fe Quintero Ruiz
- Jorge Reyes as Sergio Grimán
- Crisol Carabal as Gloria Miralles
- Miguel de León as Valentín Alcántara
- Juan Carlos Vivas as Elias Grimán
- Loly Sanchez as Alicia Vda. de Miralles
- José Torres as Media Chola
- Roberto Lamarca as Chon Quintero
- Tania Sarabia as Rafaela "Fela" Palacios
- Amilcar Rivero as Inocencio Ruiz
- Gigi Zanchetta as Caridad Arriechi
- Karl Hoffman as Armando Montilla
- Flor Elena Gonzalez as Esther Miralles
- Amanda Gutiérrez as Piedad Ruiz de Quintero
- Carlos Olivier as Erasmo Grimán

=== Supporting ===
- Judith Vásquez as Eusebia Martínez
- Reina Hinojosa as Berta Ortíz
- Bebsabe Duque as Niurka Higuera
- Claudia La Gatta as Milady Castillo
- Reinaldo José Pérez as Pantaleón Burguillos
- Jose Manuel Suárez as Luisito Arriechi
- Erika Schwarzgruber as Barbarita Ortíz
- Rodrigo González as Alejandrito Grimán Adriani
- Joseph de Abreu as Angelucha
- Henry Rodríguez
- Elio Pietrini
