= El País de las mujeres =

Television series

- Genre: Telenovela; Romance; Drama
- Created by: Leonardo Padrón
- Written by: Leonardo Padròn; Mónica Montañés; Doris Segui; Mariana Reyes
- Directed by: Carlos Izquierdo
- Starring: Ana Karina Manco; Víctor Cámara; Caridad Canelón; Jean Carlo Simancas; Viviana Gibelli; Carolina Perpetuo
- Opening theme: Ruleta Rusa by Enrique Iglesias
- Ending theme: Esperanza by Enrique Iglesias
- Country of origin: Venezuela
- Original language: Spanish
- No. of episodes: 188

Production
- Executive producer: Sandra Rioboo
- Producer: Carolina de Jacovo
- Production location: Caracas
- Running time: 46 minutes
- Production company: Venevisión

Original release
- Network: Venevisión
- Release: 11 October 1998 – 27 September 1999

Related
- Samantha; Toda Mujer

El país de las mujeres (English title: The Country of Women) is a Venezuelan telenovela written by Leonardo Padrón and produced by Venevisión. This telenovela lasted 188 episodes and was distributed internationally by Venevisión International.

Ana Karina Manco and Víctor Cámara starred as the main protagonists with the stellar participation of Caridad Canelón, Carolina Perpetuo, Lourdes Valera, Nohely Arteaga and Viviana Gibelli. Aroldo Betancourt, Miguel Ángel Landa and Amanda Gutierrez starred as antagonists.

== Synopsis ==
On the day that Arcadia Gómez summons her five nieces to inform them that she will soon be dead, she receives a surprise of devastating proportions: all of them, without exception, have come down with a virus called "impossible love". Mariana, Miranda, Pamela, Julia and Chiqui - modern, enterprising, independent, young women - have all their hearts shattered to pieces by men.

Realizing the degree of destruction caused by the opposite sex, Arcadia decides to take drastic measures. Along with her nieces, she enters the battlefront declaring open war on all the shameless, cunning and unfaithful men who have made them suffer. Now, living under one roof and with one purpose in mind, these six beautiful women, will become a unique army that will use the mightiest weapon nature has given them: the power of their feminine charms. It is an army of women ready for anything... and the war has just begun.

== Cast ==
=== Main cast ===
- Ana Karina Manco as Mariana Campos Gómez
- Víctor Cámara as Camilo Reyes
- Jean Carlo Simancas as Fabian Aristimuño
- Viviana Gibelli as Pamela Fuentes Gómez
- Carolina Perpetuo as Miranda Fuentes Gómez
- Orlando Urdaneta as Jacobo Reyes
- Nohely Arteaga as Julia Gallardo Gómez
- Aroldo Betancourt as Rodolfo Matamoros
- Lourdes Valera as Chiqui Gallardo Gómez
- Caridad Canelón as Arcadia Gómez de Peña
- Miguel Angel Landa as Arsenio Peña
- Elba Escobar as Catalina de Falcón
- Gustavo Rodríguez as Lucas Falcón

=== Supporting cast ===
- Pedro Lander as Manrique
- Gabriela Vergara as Almendra Sánchez
- Roberto Lamarca as Tino Urutia
- Elisa Escámez as Cienfuegos
- Haydée Balza as Natalia Gomez
- Yanis Chimaras as Raymond Ruiz
- Luis Gerónimo Abreu as Salvador Falcón
- Ana Castell as Sagrario de Sánchez
- Pedro Durán as Prospero Sánchez
- Vicente Tepedino as Diego
- Tania Sarabia as Josefina Beltrán de Negretti
- Raúl Amundaray as Cuenca
- Maria Fabiola Colmenares as Sandra
- Tatiana Capote as herself
- Mauricio González as Felicio Campos
- Amanda Gutiérrez as Natalia
- Rafael Romero as Javier
- Alberto Alifa as Daniel
- Gigi Zancheta as Greta
- Natalia Capelletti as Cristina
- José Luis Zuleta as Jefferson
- Sonia Villamizar as Graciela
- Carolina Muziotti as Carola
- Andreína Yépez as Yulessi
- César Román as Mojallito
- Carlos Flores as Crespito
- Samantha Suárez as Alejandrita Reyes Gallardo
- Osiris Manrique as Ulises Falcón Marino
- Judith Vázquez as Mariela
- Carlos Carrera as Crespo
- Ana Mássimo as Yuberí
- Luis Alberto de Mozos as Doctor
- Isabel Moreno as Abogada
- Francisco Ferrari as Abogado
- Martha Carbillo as Justina
- Joel Sandoval as Tonito
- Mimi Lazo as herself
- Gioconda Belli
