= El amor las vuelve locas =

Television series

- Genre: Telenovela; Romance
- Created by: Leonardo Padrón
- Written by: Alberto Gómez; Silviano Suárez; Haydee Ascanio
- Directed by: Arquímedes Rivero; César Bolivar
- Starring: Lilibeth Morillo; Carlos Montilla; Jorge Aravena; Fabiola Colmenares; Juan Carlos García; Marisa Román
- Opening theme: "El Amor Las Vuelve Locas" by Alejandro Montaner
- Country of origin: Venezuela
- Original language: Spanish
- No. of episodes: 151

Production
- Executive producer: Carolina de Jacobo
- Producer: Manuel Federico Fraíz-Grijalba
- Production location: Caracas
- Running time: 45 minutes
- Production company: Venevisión

Original release
- Network: Venevisión
- Release: February 16 – July 19, 2005

Related
- Sabor a ti; Se solicita príncipe azul; Contra viento y marea (1997)

El amor las vuelve locas (English title: Love Makes Them Crazy) is a Venezuelan telenovela produced by Venevisión in 2005. The series is a remake of the telenovela Contra viento y marea written by Leonardo Padrón, and this new version was adapted by Alberto Gómez. The telenovela lasted for 151 episodes and was distributed internationally by Venevisión International.

Lilibeth Morillo and Carlos Montilla starred as the main protagonists with Jorge Aravena, Fabiola Colmenares and Loly Sánchez as antagonists.

== Plot ==
For 20 years, Fernanda has been unhappily married to Arnaldo, a wealthy and cruel man who is a womanizer and disregards Fernanda's feelings. While she was 18, Fernanda was in love with Pablo and they planned to marry. However, the brutal murder of her older brother changed Fernanda's life forever, as Pablo was accused of the crime. Through the evil schemes of her family, especially her overbearing mother, they convinced her that Pablo was dead and forced her into marrying Arnaldo.

Destiny brings her face to face with her past lover Pablo who has been released from prison, determined to exact revenge on those who falsely accused him and clear his name of the crime he was accused of. On seeing Pablo, Fernanda finds herself at a crossroads where she has conflicting feelings- on one hand, she is stuck in a dead marriage to a man she doesn't love, while on the other, she can find true happiness again with her past lover. Furthermore, Fernanda has been hiding a terrible secret. Her daughter, Ana Maria, is not Arnaldo's as everyone thinks, but Pablo's.

These two will have to face the lies, conflicts and sources that prevent them from regaining true happiness and love.

== Cast ==
=== Main ===
- Lilibeth Morillo as Fernanda Santana de Arismendi
- Carlos Montilla as Pablo Martínez
- Jorge Aravena as Arnaldo Arismendi
- Fabiola Colmenares as Raquel Espina
- Marisa Román as Vanessa Montilla
- Juan Carlos García as Guillermo "Memo" Morales
- Ana Karina Casanova as Ana María Arismendi Santana

=== Secondary ===
- Nohely Arteaga as Mara Montilla
- Beatriz Valdés as Scarlett Conde
- Henry Soto as Eduardo Córdova
- Yanis Chimaras as Luciano Santibáñez
- Gledys Ibarra as Irene Pérez
- Roberto Lamarca as Tobías San Juan
- Tania Sarabia as Olvido
- Beba Rojas as Lily Fajardo
- Alberto Alifa as Ignacio Aguirre
- Milena Santander as Pastora Cabrera
- Carmen Julia Álvarez as Amparo
- Chony Fuentes as Yolanda
- Loly Sánchez as Maximiliana Santana
- Daniela Bascopé as Rosaura Escobar
- Luis Gerónimo Abreu as Emilio Aldana
- María Antonieta Duque as Amapola Castillo
- Carlos Augusto Maldonado as Carliño Costera
- Fernando Villate as Goliath González
- Rhandy Piñango as Alex
- Claudia La Gatta as Cristina Caudal
- Erika Schwarzgruber as Abigaíl
