= Cosita rica =

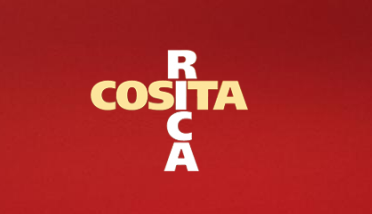
- Genre: Telenovela
- Created by: Leonardo Padrón
- Directed by: César Bolívar; Gregorio Escala; Ibrahim Guerra; Sergio Martínez; Arquímedes Rivero
- Creative directors: Nayibe Pérez; Evelyn Villegas
- Starring: Fabiola Colmenares; Rafael Novoa; Chiquinquirá Delgado; Gledys Ibarra; Carlos Cruz; Marialejandra Martín; Aroldo Betancourt; Elba Escobar; Nohely Arteaga; Daniel Alvarado; Marisa Román; Édgar Ramírez; Tania Sarabia; Carlos Villamizar; Lourdes Valera; Roberto Lamarca; Beatriz Valdés; Ricardo Bianchi; Juan Carlos Vivas; Franklin Virgüez
- Music by: Pablo Escalona; Víctor Escalona
- Opening theme: "Cosita rica" by Voz Veis
- Country of origin: Venezuela
- Original language: Spanish
- No. of episodes: 271

Production
- Executive producer: Arquímedes Rivero
- Producers: Yasmín Rodríguez; Cristóbal Barberena; Carolina De Jacobo
- Production location: Venezuela
- Cinematography: Johnny Febles
- Editors: Orlando Manzo; Moisés Guédez
- Camera setup: Multi-camera

Original release
- Network: Venevisión
- Release: September 30, 2003 – August 30, 2004

Related
- Engañada; Sabor a ti; Cosita linda

Cosita rica is a Venezuelan telenovela written by Leonardo Padrón and produced by Venevisión between 2003 and 2004.

Fabiola Colmenares and Rafael Novoa starred as the main protagonists, while Chiquinquirá Delgado, Carlos Cruz and Nohely Arteaga starred as the antagonists.

== History ==
On September 30, 2003, Venevisión started airing Cosita rica at 9:00 pm. The last episode was aired on August 30, 2004, with Sabor a ti replacing it.

During its broadcast, the telenovela became a hit among viewers due to its combination of humor, romance and drama with political and socio-cultural commentary. At the time the telenovela was on air, Venezuela was going through a presidential recall referendum, and the media was heavily polarized. The character of Olegario Pérez was seen as an alter-ego of then president Hugo Chávez, and events in the telenovela mirrored what was happening in the country.

After the end of the broadcast of Cosita rica, the Venezuelan government created the Law on Social Responsibility on Radio and Television which aimed as censuring writers and television content produced in the country. This affected subsequent telenovelas produced by RCTV (which was shut down in 2007 by the government of Chávez for its anti-government stand) and Venevisión, as writers became restrictive in terms of what content they could write and produce.

== Plot ==
Paula, the most popular girl of the neighborhood, dreams of becoming a dancer. The day she meets Diego Luján, the young heir of a cosmetic holding, she can't stop thinking of him. Diego is about to get married with the famous model Vicky Cárdenas. But destiny is going to play its cards and the sudden encounter between Paula and Diego turns into a love story.

Paula and Diego meet again and during the week they spend together, their lives change forever. Diego promises Paula to cancel his engagement to Vicky and they both agree to meet at the airport to start a new life.

When Paula arrives at the airport, she sees how an old and weak man can't manage the luggage he carries, so Paula decides to help him. When they are about to cross the immigration line, the authorities discover drugs inside the old man's luggage that Paula is holding, but the man has disappeared and Paula is sent to jail for five years. Paula cannot get in touch with Diego to explain him the situation. Diego looks for her with any success.

Today, five years later, Paula leaves jail. She wants to recover her life and to revenge the man who destroyed her future. She starts working as makeup girl. One day, she is hired to make up a bride. This is the day when she reencounters Diego, who is going to get married. The impact is mutual. But there's nothing to do. It's too late.

The day of the wedding, Diego's father dies unexpectedly and the worst comes when he finds out that he is not the heir. Olegario Pérez, the bastard son of Diego's father, will manage the holding. From one day to another, Olegario Pérez will become one of the most powerful executives of the country. The worst comes when Olegario meets Paula by chance and he falls in love with her. Olegario asks Diego to help him conquer a woman. Without knowing that the woman is Paula, Diego helps his stepbrother writing love letters, choosing the flowers, the restaurants and the presents for him. Paula starts falling in love with him and she accepts to get marry to Olegario. A duel begins for the love of Paula between the two brothers.

== Cast ==
=== Main ===
- Fabiola Colmenares as Paula Chacón / Paula C
- Rafael Novoa as Diego Luján
- Chiquinquirá Delgado as Victoria "Vicky" Cárdenas
- Gledys Ibarra as Patria Mía
- Carlos Cruz as Olegario Pérez
- Marialejandra Martín as Lara de Santana
- Aroldo Betancourt as Vicente Santana
- Elba Escobar as Concordia Pérez
- Nohely Arteaga as Tiffany Crúz
- Daniel Alvarado as Lisandro Fonseca
- Marisa Román as Verónica Lujan / María Suspiro
- Édgar Ramírez as Cacique Chacón
- Tania Sarabia as Mamasanta
- Carlos Villamizar as Placido Chacón
- Lourdes Valera as La Chata
- Roberto Lamarca as Diómedes Crespo
- Beatriz Valdés as Prodigio Vargas
- Ricardo Bianchi as Rodolfo Lima
- Juan Carlos Vivas as Rosendo
- Franklin Virgüez as Nicomedes Luján
- Mariángel Ruiz as Alegría Méndez

=== Recurring ===
- Marina Baura as Tentación Luján
- Yanis Chimaras as Juancho
- Beba Rojas as Panchita
- Ana Karina Manco as Camila
- Guillermo Dávila as Gastón
- Josué Villae as Guillermo
