= Contra viento y marea (Venezuelan TV series) =

- Genre: Telenovela; Romance; Drama
- Created by: Leonardo Padrón
- Written by: Leonardo Padrón; Doris Seguí; Monica Montañés
- Directed by: Leonardo Galavis; Carlos Izquierdo
- Starring: Guillermo Dávila; Ana Karina Manco; Mimi Lazo; Carolina Perpetuo; Carlos Olivier
- Theme music composer: Guillermo Dávila
- Opening theme: Días de Pasión by Guillermo Dávila
- Country of origin: Venezuela
- Original language: Spanish
- No. of episodes: 120

Production
- Executive producer: Alicia Avila
- Producers: Laura Rodríguez; Ángel Boscán.
- Running time: 45 minutes
- Production company: Venevisión

Original release
- Network: Venevisión
- Release: July 9 – November 26, 1997

Related
- Todo por tu amor; Destino de mujer; El amor las vuelve locas (2005)

Contra viento y marea (English title: Against All Odds) is a Venezuelan telenovela written by Leonardo Padrón and produced by Venevisión in 1997. This telenovela lasted 125 episodes and was distributed internationally by Venevisión International.

Guillermo Dávila and Ana Karina Manco starred as the main protagonists with Mimí Lazo, Carolina Perpetuo and Carlos Olivier as the antagonists.

== Synopsis ==
Nearly twenty years ago, a tragic event separated Daniela Borges from Sebastian Leon, someone she once deeply cared for. Since then, Daniela has built a family life, spending 18 years married to a wealthy businessman, with whom she has a teenage daughter. However, Sebastian's unexpected return brings changes to her circumstances and presents Daniela with difficult personal decisions.

It all began when Daniela and Sebastian were 16 years old. The minute they met, they knew they were meant for each other and came to share the kind of passion neither one would ever feel again. But Daniela's father, Don Ramon, had other plans for his daughter: marrying her to Aquiles Millan, a businessman with a brilliant future. Daniela and Sebastian suffered through Don Roman's stern opposition, which was fueled in great part by his wife, Dona Jose, a possessive, commanding woman. Then, one fatal night, Sebastian decided to face Don Roman and let him know once and for all that he would never leave Daniela. Suddenly, a shot was heard in the study where they were arguing. When Daniela, her mother and her sister rushed in, they found Don Roman dead in the floor, with Sebastian standing over him. The consequences of that moment were devastating: Sebastian was sentenced to 20 years in prison, and Daniela was left to live with the horror of thinking he was responsible for her father's murder.

After the tragedy, Daniela gave in to her mother's wishes and soon married Aquiles Millan. The marriage, however, has never been a happy one - she is not in love with Aquiles, who turned out to be an insensitive womanizer. For the past 18 years Daniela has been going through the motions, trying to forget the past. But even now, she is still overcome with a mixture of love and hate for Sebastian - even though she believes he was killed a long time ago during a prison revolt.

Daniela's life will be dramatically altered by Sebastian's reappearance. He has done his time and is now back to fulfill his obsession: proving his innocence, getting revenge on the real killer and winning Daniela back. The last part of his plan will be the hardest - because on the road to recovering her love he'll be confronted with strong adversaries. Among them: Virginia Lugo, a dangerously twisted psychologist who is in love with him, Doña Jose, Aquiles and Daniela herself, who is torn between what her heart tells her and her commitments as a wife and mother. A ghost from the past rekindles the flame of an irrepressible passion. Will this love be stronger than reason? Sometimes, the past shows up when we least expect it.

== Cast ==
- Guillermo Dávila as Sebastián León
- Ana Karina Manco as Daniela Borges Montilla de Millán
- Carolina Perpetuo as Virginia Lugo
- Mimi Lazo as Josefina "Doña José" Montilla Vda. de Borges
- Carlos Olivier as Aquiles Millán
- Gigi Zancheta as Xiomara Quintana
- Juan Carlos Vivas as El Duque
- Elizabeth Morales as Susana
- Yanis Chimaras as Jesús "Chúo" García
- Lourdes Valera as La Zurda
- Roberto Lamarca as Nicolas
- Elba Escobar as Mistica Gamboa
- Gustavo Rodríguez as Alvaro Luján
- Jonathan Montenegro as Ignacio
- Deyalit Lopez as Azucar
- Eileen Abad as La Nena
- Virginia Garcia as Valeria Borges
- Maria Eugenia Perera as Thamara
- Tatiana Padron as Fabiola
- Margarita Hernandez as Lupe
- Aitor Gaviria as Tobias
- Romelia Aguero as Crisalida
- Jose Torres as Zorba
- Sofia Diaz as Gabrielita
