= Natalia del mar =

Venezuelan telenovela (2011–12)

- Genre: Telenovela
- Created by: Omaira Rivero; Alberto Gómez
- Directed by: Carlos Izquierdo
- Starring: Sabrina Salvador; Manuel Sosa
- Opening theme: "Contra Corriente" by Roque Valero
- Ending theme: "Me Muero Por Quererte" Calibú ft. Leycang El Grandioso
- Country of origin: Venezuela
- Original language: es
- No. of episodes: 186

Production
- Executive producer: Manuel Federico Fraíz-Grijalba
- Producer: Alejandro Salazar
- Production locations: Chichiriviche; Playa Esperanza
- Cinematography: Carmelina de Jacovo
- Editors: Juan José Hernández; Manuel Calderón

Original release
- Network: Venevisión
- Release: June 28, 2011 – March 12, 2012

Natalia del mar (English: Natalie of the Sea) is a Venezuelan telenovela created by Alberto Gómez for Venevisión in 2011. The series stars Sabrina Salvador and Manuel Sosa as the main protagonists, and Víctor Cámara, Fedra López, Rosalinda Serfaty, and Juliet Lima as the main antagonists.

The show premiered on Venevisión on June 28, 2011, at 2:00 pm.

== Plot ==
This is the story of Natalia Uribe (Sabrina Salvador), a humble and simple girl who works as a saleswoman in a town on Margarita Island and lives with her mother, Mirtha (Gigi Zanchetta). Natalia is actually the daughter of Paulina Andrade de Uzcátegui (Sabrina Salvador), a wealthy woman who was murdered by her sister-in-law. Since that day, Mirtha raised Natalia as her own, and she never knew the truth about her origin.

On the other hand, Luis Manuel Moncada (Manuel Sosa) grew up surrounded by luxury with his siblings, Gerardo (Víctor Drija), Álvaro (Héctor Peña), and Mariana (Vanessa Pallas). Although Luis Manuel is not Valerio Moncada's (Eduardo Serrano) biological son, Valerio, a tough and authoritarian man, always favored him. Luis Manuel's true father is Adolfo Uzcátegui (Víctor Cámara), a manipulative and despotic man who owns Playa Esperanza, a town that used to belong to the Moncada family. This makes Adolfo the worst enemy of Valerio, who is married to Eleonora (Flor Elena González), a woman who was once in love with Adolfo and had Luis Manuel with him.

When Luis Manuel returns from Miami, he learns about a peace agreement between his family and the Uzcátegui family. However, he soon discovers that it's just a pretext for Valerio and Adolfo's personal gain. According to the agreement, Luis Manuel is supposed to marry Perla (Juliet Lima), Adolfo's daughter, who has always been infatuated with him. The problem is that Perla is already married in secret to Ernesto Valderrama (Damián Genovese), a self-interested opportunist engaged to Mariana Moncada, Luis Manuel's sister.

After Mirtha's death, Natalia has no choice but to move to Playa Esperanza to live with her grandfather, Jacinto (Fernando Flores), and her half-siblings, Rosarito (Juliette Pardau), who is blind since birth, and Domingo (Christian McGaffney). Upon her return, Natalia reunites with Luis Manuel, whom she has known since childhood, and they rediscover their deep love for each other.

In the Uzcátegui mansion, Adolfo resides with his wife, Irene (Rosalinda Serfaty), their daughters, Perla (Juliet Lima) and Patricia (Rosanna Zanetti), their son-in-law, Octavio Valladares (Adrián Delgado) - Patricia's ambitious and cunning husband - and Sara (Fedra López), Adolfo's sister-in-law and a wicked widow. Sara has always despised Irene due to her unrequited love for Adolfo. Sara and her equally malicious son, Julián (Daniel Martínez Campos), live in the Uzcátegui mansion as well.

Natalia secures a job as a maid in the Uzcátegui mansion, and when Adolfo sees her, he falls deeply in love with her because she bears a striking resemblance to Paulina, his deceased first wife and Natalia's mother. Determined to win her over, Adolfo becomes obsessed and goes to great lengths. He even forces Irene out of the house, leading her to lose her sanity.

In Playa Esperanza, Natalia will also have to confront the gossip and rumors spread by Pasionaria (Dora Mazzone), a talkative woman who resides with her niece, Candy Mileidys (Gioia Arismendi), and runs the local bar, where most of the rumors in Playa Esperanza originate.

The main goal for Luis Manuel is to overcome all these obstacles to find happiness with his beloved "Natalia del Mar."

== Cast ==
=== Main cast ===
- Sabrina Salvador as Natalia Uribe / Paulina de Uzcátegui
- Manuel Sosa as Luis Manuel Moncada

=== Also as main cast ===
- Víctor Cámara as Adolfo Uzcátegui
- Rosalinda Serfaty as Irene López
- Eduardo Serrano as Valerio Moncada
- Dora Mazzone as Pasionaria López
- Flor Elena González as Eleonora
- Juliet Lima as Perla Uzcátegui
- Adrián Delgado as Octavio Valladares
- Yul Bürkle as Father Baltazar
- Fedra López as Sara Morales
- Franklin Virgüez as Baldomero Sánchez
- Christian McGaffney as Domingo Uribe
- Maria Antonieta Castillo as Loly Montesinos
- Víctor Drija as Gerardo Moncada
- Gioia Arismendi as Candy Romero
- Damián Genovese as Ernesto Valderrama
- Roberto Lamarca as Teodoro Rivas
- Esther Orjuela as Fernanda de Rivas
- Rosita Vásquez as Pastora Pérez
- Romelia Agüero as Carmela Díaz
- Fernando Flores as Jacinto Uribe

=== Supporting cast ===
- Dayra Lambis as Vivianita de Sánchez
- Juvel Vielma as Piraña
- Vanessa Pallás as Mariana Moncada
- Rosanna Zanetti as Patricia Uzcátegui
- Juliette Pardau as Rosarito Uribe
- Daniel Martínez-Campos as Julián Uzcátegui
- Héctor Peña as Álvaro Moncada
- Nany Továr as Sandra Pérez
- Rosmel Bustamante as Pulpito

=== Special participation ===
- Gigi Zanchetta as Mirtha
- Félix Loreto as Ramón Calzada
- Veronica Montes as Mariela
- Mirtha Perez as Malua
- Magaly Serrano as Karen
- Leycang El Grandioso as himself

== Venezuela broadcast ==
- Release dates, episode name & length, based on Venevisión's broadcast.

Air Date	Number	Episode Title	Duration
June 28, 2011	001	La hermosa y complicada historia de amor entre Natalia Uribe y Luis Manuel Moncada	44 minutes
June 29, 2011	002	Natalia defiende a su hermana Rosarito	43 minutes
June 30, 2011	003	El primer beso de Natalia y Luis Manuel	42 minutes
July 1, 2011	004	Adolfo despide a Natalia de su casa	42 minutes
July 2, 2011	005	Perla no es hija de Adolfo	43 minutes
July 4, 2011	006	Natalia defiende a Rosarito de la maldad de Julian	41 minutes
July 5, 2011	007	Natalia no sabe que Luis Manuel se va a casar con Perla	42 minutes
July 6, 2011	008	Natalia se entera que Luis Manuel se casa con Perla	43 minutes
July 7, 2011	009	Natalia es acusada de homicidio	42 minutes
July 8, 2011	010	Natalia rechaza la ayuda de Luis Manuel	45 minutes
July 9, 2011	011	Natalia queda libre gracias a Adolfo	43 minutes
July 11, 2011	012	Pasionaria entra a la casa abandonada de Adolfo	42 minutes
July 12, 2011	013	Adolfo amenaza a Irene con echarla de su casa	43 minutes
July 13, 2011	014	Natalia le mancha de negro el vestido de novia de Perla	41 minutes
July 14, 2011	015	Mariana huye de su boda para encontrarse con Domingo	44 minutes
July 15, 2011	016	Rosarito es víctima de una bala perdida	43 minutes
July 16, 2011	017	Natalia decide olvidarse de Luis Manuel	42 minutes
July 18, 2011	018	El primer beso de Gerardo y Rosarito	43 minutes
July 19, 2011	019	Natalia decide mudarse a Caracas	44 minutes
July 20, 2011	020	Adolfo defiende a Natalia y a Pastora de los ataques de Perla	42 minutes
July 21, 2011	021	Pasionaria y Vivianita despiden a Natalia a golpes	45 minutes
July 22, 2013	022	Valerio confunde a Natalia con Paulina	43 minutes
July 23, 2011	023	Valerio se entera que es el padre de Natalia	42 minutes
July 25, 2011	024	Valerio intentará recuperar el tiempo perdido con Natalia	43 minutes
July 26, 2011	025	Adolfo bota de su casa a Irene	41 minutes
July 27, 2011	026	Eleonora revive viejas pasiones con Adolfo	42 minutes
July 28, 2011	027	Perla acaba con Ernesto	44 minutes
July 29, 2011	028	Luis Manuel llama a Natalia para acusarla injustamente	41 minutes
July 30, 2011	029	Patricia acusa al Padre Baltazar de haber abusado de ella	42 minutes
August 1, 2011	030	Brujería contra Natalia	42 minutes
August 2, 2011	031	Natalia regresa a Playa Esperanza	43 minutes
August 3, 2011	032	Perla se cae por las escaleras y culpan a Natalia	41 minutes
August 4, 2011	033	Luis Manuel y Perla se casan	45 minutes
August 5, 2011	034	La luna de miel de Perla y Luis Manuel	42 minutes
August 6, 2011	035	Luis Manuel deja plantada a perla en su noche de boda	43 minutes
August 8, 2011	036	Pasionaria La Millonaria	43 minutes
August 9, 2011	037	Perla se entera que no es hija legítima de Adolfo Uzcátegui	42 minutes
August 10, 2011	038	Valerio destruye el puesto de Loly	45 minutes
August 11, 2011	039	Adolfo amenaza a Luis Manuel con un arma de fuego	41 minutes
August 12, 2011	040	Ernesto regresa a Playa Esperanza	40 minutes
August 13, 2011	041	Valerio sufre un infarto	43 minutes
August 15, 2011	042	Natalia es acusada de robo	42 minutes
August 16, 2011	043	Acusaciones de Perla	41 minutes
August 17, 2011	044	Natalia se defiende de la maldad de Perla	45 minutes
August 18, 2011	045	La ambición de Pasionaria	41 minutes
August 19, 2011	046	Jacinto pierde su ranchito en un incendio provocado por Julián	43 minutes
August 20, 2011	047	Luis Manuel cela a Natalia de Adolfo	41 minutes
August 22, 2011	048	Bruno ya no es sacerdote	42 minutes
August 23, 2011	049	Irene pierde la razón	42 minutes
August 24, 2011	050	Adolfo cambia su testamento y le deja todo a Natalia	43 minutes
August 25, 2011	051	Pasionaria la millionaria	40 minutes
August 26, 2011	052	Irene atropella a Adolfo	41 minutes
August 27, 2011	053	Adolfo y Natalia se casan	44 minutes
August 29, 2011	054	Adolfo le miente a todos con su supuesta muerte	43 minutes
August 30, 2011	055	Sara bota a Natalia de la casa Uzcátegui	45 minutes
August 31, 2011	056	Natalia es acusada de robo	42 minutes
September 1, 2011	057	Perla echa a su tía de la casa	41 minutes
September 2, 2011	058	Natalia hereda Playa Esperanza	46 minutes
September 3, 2011	059	Sara y Perla se vengarán de Natalia	43 minutes
September 5, 2011	060	Natalia se enfrenta a su padre Valerio	42 minutes
September 6, 2011	061	Capitulo 61	41 minutes
September 7, 2011	062	Julián abusa de Rosarito	45 minutes
September 8, 2011	063	Irene intenta hacerle daño a Adolfo	41 minutes
September 9, 2011	064	Pasionaria denuncia a Baldomero	45 minutes
September 10, 2011	065	Todos quieren quitarle Playa Esperanza a Natalia	43 minutes
September 12, 2011	066	Eleonora le confiesa a Valerio la verdad sobre Luis Manuel	44 minutes
September 13, 2011	067	Pulpito pierde su casa	42 minutes
September 14, 2011	068	Empieza a vivir con Natalia	45 minutes
September 15, 2011	069	Perla le firma el divorcio a Luis Manuel	44 minutes
September 16, 2011	070	Perla se vengará de Natalia	41 minutes
September 17, 2011	071	Perla descubre que su padre no está muerto	44 minutes
September 19, 2011	072	Perla visita a su padre	45 minutes
September 20, 2011	073	Rosarito confiesa el daño que le hizo Julián	41 minutes
September 21, 2011	074	Rosarito decide vivir en Caracas	43 minutes
September 22, 2011	075	Gerardo sufre la partida de Rosarito	41 minutes
September 23, 2011	076	Adolfo llama a su casa y cuelga	42 minutes
September 24, 2011	077	Gerardo no soporta la ausencia de Rosarito	40 minutes
September 26, 2011	078	Irene huye por el asesinato de Diana la enfermera de Adolfo	44 minutes
September 27, 2011	079	Natalia y Luis Manuel se casan	43 minutes
September 28, 2011	080	Adolfo regresa a Playa Esperanza	45 minutes
September 29, 2011	081	Adolfo no perdonará la traición de Natalia	42 minutes
September 30, 2011	082	Natalia y Luis Manuel consuman por primera vez su amor	46 minutes
October 3, 2011	083	Natalia y Luis Manuel no pueden seguir juntos	42 minutes
October 4, 2011	084	Gerardo viaja a Caracas en busca de Rosarito	43 minutes
October 5, 2011	085	Patricia ataca a Candy por celos	41 minutes
October 6, 2011	086	Valerio quiere que Natalia viva en su casa	44 minutes
October 7, 2011	087	Natalia está embarazada de Luis Manuel	43 minutes
October 8, 2011	088	Luis Manuel se entera que no es un Moncada	44 minutes
October 10, 2011	089	Eleonora debe decirle la verdad a Luis Manuel	42 minutes
October 11, 2011	090	Luis Manuel le exige a su madre que le diga quien es su padre	40 minutes
October 12, 2011	091	Vivianita y Loly pelean por Baldomero	41 minutes
October 13, 2011	092	Gerardo consigue a Rosarito	40 minutes
October 14, 2011	093	Adolfo engaña a Natalia y amenaza a Pastorita	42 minutes
October 15, 2011	094	Pastora aparece gravemente herida	43 minutes
October 17, 2011	095	Pasionaria sigue en busca del tesoro	40 minutes
October 18, 2011	096	Luis Manuel amenaza a Natalia con quitarle a su bebe	41 minutes
October 19, 2011	097	Acusan a Adolfo de asesinar a la bruja Malúa	40 minutes
October 20, 2011	098	Luis Manuel se entera que Adolfo es su padre	43 minutes
October 21, 2011	099	Natalia no quiere ver más a Luis ni a Adolfo	42 minutes
October 22, 2011	100	Rosarito sigue firme con su decisión de ser monja	40 minutes
October 24, 2011	101	Natalia es secuestrada por Adolfo	41 minutes
October 25, 2011	102	Natalia no quiere que Luis la visite en la habitación de la medicatura	40 minutes
October 26, 2011	103	Mariana encuentra a Domingo con otra	44 minutes
October 27, 2011	104	Adolfo le dispara a Álvaro	42 minutes
October 28, 2011	105	Natalia es acusada de asesinato	43 minutes
October 29, 2011	106	Natalia es obligada a regresar a la mansión Uzcátegui	40 minutes
October 31, 2011	107	Natalia engaña a Adolfo disfrazándose de Paulina	42 minutes
November 1, 2011	108	Adolfo descubre que Natalia es hija de Paulina	45 minutes
November 2, 2011	109	Rosarito se opera para recuperar la vista	42 minutes
November 3, 2011	110	Perla le pide a Luis Manuel tener un bebé	43 minutes
November 4, 2011	111	Candy y Bruno se casan	40 minutes
November 5, 2011	112	Natalia escapa de la casa de Adolfo	43 minutes
November 7, 2011	113	Rosarito recupera la vista	40 minutes
November 8, 2011	114	Natalia está desaparecida	44 minutes
November 9, 2011	115	Irene y Natalia sobreviven al accidente	45 minutes
November 10, 2011	116	Vivianita se muda a la Mansión Uzcátegui	40 minutes
November 11, 2011	117	Hermano de Bruno besa a Pasionaria	43 minutes
November 12, 2011	118	Natalia empieza a recordar cosas de su pasado	40 minutes
November 14, 2011	119	Recupera la memoria	45 minutes
November 15, 2011	120	Natalia recupera la memoria	41 minutes
November 16, 2011	121	Estefanía y Natalia se conocen	43 minutes
November 17, 2011	122	Perla descubre que Natalia está viva	45 minutes
November 18, 2011	123	Natalia da a luz a unas gemelitas	43 minutes
November 19, 2011	124	Adolfo descubre el escondite de Natalia	42 minutes
November 21, 2011	125	Luis Manuel y Estefania se casarán	41 minutes
November 22, 2011	126	Luis Manuel y Estefania se casan	43 minutes
November 23, 2011	127	La familia de Natalia se entera que está viva	40 minutes
November 24, 2011	128	Natalia descubre que Luis Manuel está casado	43 minutes
November 25, 2011	129	Luis Manuel descubre que Natalia está viva	45 minutes
November 26, 2011	130	Adolfo se entera que Natalia está viva	42 minutes
November 28, 2011	131	Adolfo le envía una hermosa gargantilla a Natalia	40 minutes
November 29, 2011	132	Estefanía descubre que está muy enferma	45 minutes
November 30, 2011	133	Luis Manuel quiere reconquistar a Natalia	43 minutes
December 1, 2011	134	Ruperta amenaza a Natalia	41 minutes
December 2, 2011	135	Bruno se muda a la casa de Pasionaria	42 minutes
December 3, 2011	136	Jacinto amenaza a Adolfo	44 minutes
December 5, 2011	137	Estefanía se recupera de la operación	42 minutes
December 6, 2011	138	Candy descubre algo extraño entre Bruno y Patricia	40 minutes
December 7, 2011	139	Candy descubre a Patricia	43 minutes
December 8, 2011	140	Candy descubre a Patricia	41 minutes
December 9, 2011	141	Bruno, Pasionaria y Vivianita intentan escapar	44 minutes
December 12, 2011	142	Regina visita la mansión Uzcátegui	41 minutes
December 13, 2011	143	Diego regresa a la cárcel	45 minutes
December 14, 2011	144	Luis Manuel descubre que las morochitas son sus hijas	41 minutes
December 15, 2011	145	Luis Manuel descubre la verdad sobre las niñas de Natalia	43 minutes
December 16, 2011	146	Adolfo asesina a Sara e Irene	45 minutes
December 17, 2011	147	Diego escapa de la cárcel	42 minutes
December 19, 2011	148	Natalia y las morochitas están desaparecidas	43 minutes
December 20, 2011	149	Diego secuestra a una de las niñas de Natalia	41 minutes
December 21, 2011	150	Diego llama a Luis Manuel para pedir rescate por la niña de Natalia	44 minutes
December 22, 2011	151	Todo sale mal en el rescate	42 minutes
December 23, 2011	152	Diego pretende eliminar a Natalia y a su hija	41 minutes
December 24, 2011	153	La familia Uribe contenta por la aparición de Rosarito	44 minutes
December 26, 2011	154	Luis Manuel rescata a Natalia y a su hija	41 minutes
December 27, 2011	155	Capitulo 155	42 minutes
December 28, 2011	156	Natalia se niega a regresar a casa de Adolfo	43 minutes
December 29, 2011	157	Julián regresa a la mansión Uzcátegui	40 minutes
December 30, 2011	158	Inicia la fiesta aniversario del Resort de Mar Encantado	44 minutes
December 31, 2011	159	Luis Manuel le dedica una canción a Natalia	42 minutes
January 2, 2012	160	Natalia está celosa de la relación que tiene Luis con Corina	42 minutes
January 3, 2012	161	Corina y Natalia terminan como buenas amigas	41 minutes
January 4, 2012	162	Luis Manuel es atropellado saliendo del resort	43 minutes
January 5, 2011	163	El accidente de Luis Manuel	44 minutes
January 6, 2012	164	Mariana esta muy enferma	41 minutes
January 7, 2012	165	Domingo viaja a Playa Esperanza por la enfermedad de Mariana	40 minutes
January 9, 2012	166	Natalia descubre que Valerio es su padre	44 minutes
January 10, 2012	167	Luis Manuel piensa que Oswaldo fue quien lo atropelló	46 minutes
January 11, 2012	168	Perla miente ante la policía y acusa a Luis Manuel de asesinato	42 minutes
January 12, 2012	169	Julián sospecha que algo le sucedió a su madre	45 minutes
January 13, 2012	170	Luis Manuel es acusado de asesinato y encarcelado	40 minutes
January 16, 2012	171	Sospechan que Adolfo pudo haber matado a Piraña	42 minutes
January 17, 2012	172	Luis Manuel y Valerio hacen las paces	41 minutes
January 18, 2012	173	Oswaldo descubre que es adoptado	43 minutes
January 19, 2012	174	Natalia descubre que Adolfo cometió bigamia	45 minutes
January 20, 2012	175	Adolfo niega estar casado con Regina	41 minutes
January 23, 2012	176	Luis Manuel y Natalia se reconcilian	44 minutes
January 24, 2012	177	Octavio rapta a las morochitas de Natalia	41 minutes
January 25, 2012	178	Adolfo sigue huyendo de la justicia	43 minutes
March 1, 2012	179	Perla y Diego ahora son cómplices	40 minutes
March 2, 2012	180	Oswaldo le confiesa a Regina que él es su hijo perdido	44 minutes
March 5, 2012	181	Luis Manuel descubre que Oswaldo es su medio hermano	40 minutes
March 6, 2012	182	Natalia busca a Adolfo en los acantilados	41 minutes
March 7, 2012	183	Luis Manuel y Diego se enfrentan	44 minutes
March 8, 2012	184	Perla tiene una fuerte discusión con Adolfo y muere	42 minutes
March 9, 2012	185	Atrapazo	42 minutes
March 12, 2012	186	Gran final	59 minutes
