= List of Radio Caracas Televisión telenovelas =

The following is a list of telenovelas produced by Radio Caracas Televisión (RCTV).

== 1970s ==
Year	Title	Author	Ref.
1970	Cristina		
1970	Isabelita		
1970	Italiana		
1970	La virgen ciega		
1970	María		
1970	Pasiones de juventud		
1971	Bárbara		
1971	El secreto		
1971	La usurpadora		
1971	Regina Carbonell		

1980s

Year	Title	Author	Ref.
1980	Claudia		
1980	Drama de amor en el bloque seis		
1980	El esposo de Anaís		
1980	Gómez I		
1980	Marielena		
1980	Mi hijo Gabriel		
1980	Muñequita		
1980	Natalia de 8 a 9		
1980	Pensión Amalia		
1980	Rosa Campos provinciana		
1981	Amada mía		
1981	Angelito		
1981	Elizabeth		
1981	Gómez II		
1981	La comadre	Juan Carlos Genet and Román Chalbaud	
1981	La hija de nadie		
1981	Luisana mía		
1981	Luz Marina		
1981	Maite		
1981	Rosalinda		
1981	Quiero ser		
1987	Roberta	Delia Fiallo	
1988	Señora	Jose Ignacio Cabrujas	
1989	Fabiola	Delia Fiallo	
1989	Alondra		
1989	Amanda Sabater	Ibsen Martinez / Salvador Garmendia	

== 1990s ==
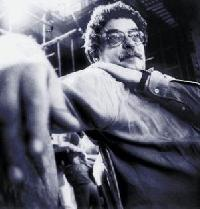
José Ignacio Cabrujas original author of Cambio de piel.

No. (Note: This only shows a stipulated total of telenovelas that were produced in the 90s, not to be confused with a total of telenovelas produced by Radio Caracas Televisión. In addition, the total number may be inconclusive, as there may be more missing productions.)	Year	Title	Eps.	Author	Ref.
1	1990	Anabel	56	Perla Palenzia	
2	1990	Carmen querida	167	Salvador Garmendia	
3	1990	De mujeres	164	Isamar Hernández	
4	1991	Caribe	176	Mariela Romero	
5	1991	El desprecio	152	Julio Cesar Mármol	
6	1992	Kassandra	150	Delia Fiallo	
7	1992	Por estas calles (Note: The telenovela premiered in 1992, but concluded in 1994.)	250 (Note: The rctvintl.com website indicates that it had 250 episodes, but it is believed that it had 700 episodes, which has not been clarified.)	Ibsen Martínez	
8	1993	Dulce ilusión	198	Mariela Romero	
9	1994	Alejandra	153	Delia Fiallo	
10	1994	Pura sangre	168	Julio César Mármol	
11	1995	De oro puro	113	Julio César Mármol	
12	1995	Amores de fin de siglo	133	Leonardo Padrón	
13	1995	El desafío	113	Martín Hahn	
14	1995	Ilusiones	135	Luis Colmenares	
15	1996	La inolvidable	120	Humberto Olivieri	
16	1996	La llaman Mariamor	181	Crucita Torres	
17	1996	Los amores de Anita Peña	180	Carlos Pérez	
18	1996	Volver a vivir	127	Fausto Verdial	
19	1997	Llovizna	145	José Simon Escalona	
20	1997	María de los Ángeles	113	Julio César Mármol	
21	1998	Cambio de piel	110	José Ignacio Cabrujas	
22	1998	Aunque me cueste la vida	126	Salvador Garmendia	
23	1998	Donde está el amor	20	Valentina Párraga	
24	1998	Hoy te vi	122	Basilio Alvarez & Laura Bottome	
25	1998	Niña mimada	112	Valentina Párraga	
26	1998	Reina de corazones	123	Humberto Olivieri	
27	1999	Carita pintada	126	Valentina Párraga	
28	1999	Luisa Fernanda	130	Xiomara Moreno	
29	1999	Mujer secreta	125	Alidha Avila	

== 2000s ==
Title	Year	Author	Ref(s)
Hay amores que matan	2000	Carlos Pérez	
Mis 3 hermanas	2000	Perla Farías	
Angélica Pecado	2000	Martín Hahn	
Viva la Pepa	2000	Valentina Párraga	
Carissima	2001	Julio Cesar Mármol	
La soberana	2001	Xiomara Moreno	
A calzón quita'o	2001	Carlos Pérez	
La niña de mis ojos	2001	Alidha Ávila	
Juana la Virgen	2002	Perla Farías	
La mujer de Judas	2002	Martín Hahn	
Mi Gorda Bella	2002	Carolina Espada, Rossana Negrín	
Trapos íntimos	2002	Valentina Párraga	
La Cuaima	2003	Carlos Pérez	
La Invasora	2003	Iris Dubbs	
¡Qué buena se puso Lola!	2004	José Manuel Peláez	
Estrambótica Anastasia	2004	Martín Hahn	
Negra consentida	2004	Valentina Párraga	
Mujer con pantalones	2004	Tony Rodríguez	
Ser bonita no basta	2005	César Sierra	
Amantes	2005	Luis Colmenares	
Amor a palos	2005	Martín Hahn	
El desprecio	2006	Julio César Mármol, Ana Carolina López	
Por todo lo alto	2006	Vivel Nouel	
Túkiti, crecí de una	2006	Ricardo Hernández Anzola	
Y los declaro marido y mujer	2006	Cristina Policastro, Martín Hahn, Xiomara Moreno	
Te tengo en salsa	2006	Ana Teresa Sosa, Neida Padilla	
Camaleona	2007	Carolina Espada	
Pura pinta	2007	Daniel Ferrer Cubillán	
Mi prima Ciela	2007	Pilar Romero	
Toda una dama	2007	José Ignacio Cabrujas	
La Trepadora	2008	Ricardo Hernández Anzola	
Nadie me dirá cómo quererte	2008	Martín Hahn	
Calle luna, Calle sol	2009	Manuel Muñoz Rico, José Vicente Quintana	
Libres como el viento	2009	Pilar Romero	
Esto es lo que hay	2009	Nacho Palacios	

=== 2010–present ===
The following is a telenovela produced by RCTV in aid with other companies from its close in 2007, the company begins to produce projects outside the country independently.

Title	Year	Notes
Que el cielo me explique	2010	Original production of the company
Las Bandidas	2013	Production between Televisa and RTI Producciones
La virgen de la calle	2014	Production between Televisa and RTI Producciones
Piel salvaje	2015	Original production of RCTV Producciones
Corazón traicionado	2017	Original production of RCTV Producciones, produced between 2015 and 2016, even without a release date, the telenovela is completely recorded.
Ellas aman, ellos mienten	2018	Original production of RCTV Producciones, produced in 2017, despite being recorded and due to the current problems that Venezuela is experiencing, its recordings were suspended.
