= Harina de otro costal =

Venezuelan television series

- Genre: Telenovela
- Created by: Venevisión
- Written by: Mónica Montañés
- Directed by: Carlos Izquierdo
- Starring: Daniela Bascopé; Christian McGaffney; Carlos Mata; Mimi Lazo; Mayra Alejandra; Basilio Álvarez; Sabrina Seara; Adrián Delgado
- Opening theme: "El odio y el amor" by Guaco
- Country of origin: Venezuela
- Original language: Spanish
- No. of episodes: 60

Production
- Executive producer: Consuelo Delgado
- Producer: Thais Campos
- Production location: Caracas
- Production company: Venevisión

Original release
- Network: Venevisión
- Release: April 7 – June 23, 2010

Related
- Tomasa Tequiero; La mujer perfecta

Harina de otro costal (Another Matter) is a Venezuelan telenovela produced by and shown on Venevisión and Venevisión Continental in 2010. This telenovela, written by Mónica Montañés is a free version of William Shakespeare's Romeo and Juliet.

Daniela Bascopé and Christian McGaffney star in the roles of Valentina and Victor respectively. Sabrina Seara and Adrián Delgado also appear.

The telenovela was premiered on April 7, 2010.

== Plot ==
Valentina Fernández (Daniela Bascopé) is a young woman born into a high class family. She is the daughter of Don Aniceto who started a bakery with his best friend Don Plutarco, the father of Victor Hernández (Christian McGaffney). Both families are now at war due to the appearance of Santos (Ivan Tamayo) a greedy man who carried on an affair with both their wives in secret. However, in the midst of this conflict, a pure love develops between Valentina and Victor, but their love not only has to face the challenge of the feud between their families, but the interference of Cándida (Sabrina Seara), a young virgin who is determined to marry Victor, and Calipe (Adrián Delgado), a selfish man who is determined to woo Valentina at whatever cost.

== Cast ==
- Daniela Bascopé ... Valentina Fernández
- Christian McGaffney ... Victor Hernández
- Carlos Mata ... Plutarco Hernández
- Mimí Lazo ... Maigualida de Hernández
- Mayra Alejandra ... Carmencita de Fernández
- Basilio Álvarez ... Aniceto Fernández
- Sabrina Seara ... Cándida Roca
- Adrián Delgado ... Carlos Felipe Colón "Calipe"
- Ivan Tamayo ... Santos
- Crisol Carabal ... Angeles
- Henry Soto ... Inocencio Roca
- Lourdes Valera ... Gracia de Roca
- Carlos Villamizar ... Jesús María
- Paula Bevilacqua ... Linda
- Rhandy Piñango ... Tranquilino
- Prakriti Maduro ... Bella
- Freddy Galavís ... Eráclito
- Paula Woyzechowsky ... Pristina
- Lisbeth Manrique ... Socorrito
- Mario Sudano ... Edén
- Mariaca Semprún ... Lorenza
- Jenny Valdés ... Afrodita
- Marisol Matheus ... Pragedes
- Daniela Salazar ... Adelita
- Andreína Carvo ... Provimar
- Alexander Solórzano ... Custodio
- Geisy Rojas ... Grecia
- Rodolfo Salas ... Plutarco "Plutarquito" Fernández
- Nataly Lopez ... Coromotico
- Héctor Zambrano ... Hector
- Luis Núñez
- Omar González
- Juan Simón Vila
- Akzomin Acosta
- Rafael Hernández
- Miguel Riviera
- Melisa Hinijosa
- Raúl Hernández ... Selocuido/Carlos Chirinos
- Andrea García
- Arismart Marichales
- Agustín Segnini ... Cuartoekilo
- Luis Pérez Pons ... Gordo
- Nelson Farías ... Augusto
- María Laura Zambrano ... Leidy
- Mirtha Borges ... Natividad Chirinos
