= Ellas aman, ellos mienten =

- Genre: Telenovela
- Created by: José Vicente Quintana
- Written by: Daniel González; Giuliana Rodríguez; Daniel Alfonso Rojas; José Vicente Quintana
- Directed by: Luis Enrique Padilla
- Creative director: Javier Vidal
- Starring: Patricia Amenta; Héctor Peña; Flavia Gleske; Erick Ronso; Julie Restifo
- Opening theme: "Olas del mar" by Daniel Huen
- Country of origin: Venezuela
- Original language: Spanish
- No. of episodes: 60

Production
- Executive producer: Hernando Faría
- Producer: Marvin Reyes
- Cinematography: Carlos González
- Editors: Irwing Coronado; Miguel Mudarra; Josué Rincón
- Camera setup: Multi-camera
- Production company: RCTV Producciones

Original release
- Network: Televen
- Release: September 19 – December 18, 2018

Ellas aman, ellos mienten is a Venezuelan telenovela written by José Vicente Quintana, produced by RCTV Producciones and distributed by RCTV International. It stars Patricia Amenta, and Héctor Peña. The telenovela was presented last year at NATPE.

Principal photography began on 9 May 2017. Televen began airing Ellas aman, ellos mienten from September 19, 2018.

== Plot ==
The story unfolds under the hot sun and passion of the Caribbean Sea. Ana Isabel learned to doubt men, in a house of single women, because her mother and grandmother were abandoned by deceitful men. She is also the victim of a great lie and faces the same disappointment as her predecessors. Salvador, her love, is the cause of her sister's death. However, Julián, a fun and romantic biker, will make him see that not all men are liars.

== Cast ==
- Patricia Amenta as Ana Isabel Díaz
- Héctor Peña as Salvador Quiñones Casal
- Flavia Gleske as María Teresa Díaz
- Erick Ronso as Julián Contreras
- Julie Restifo as Rosa Antonia Díaz
- Raquel Yánez as Marielena Castillo
- Hecham Alhad as Marco Antonio Rivero
- Sócrates Serrano as Carlos Eduardo Quiñones
- César Bencid as Ramón Chuecos
- Jeanette Flores as Berenice Casal
- Rhandy Piñango as Héctor
- Silvana Continanza as Alicia Álvarez
- Augusto Nitti as Reinaldo Arévalo
- Nany Tóvar as Yusleidi
- Héctor Almenara as Pedro Pablo Pantoja
- Alexandra Lemoine as Milagros Rojas
- Relu Cardozo as Dolores Rivero
- América Medina as Graciela Mendoza
- Arnaldo Aponte as Brayan Parada
- Kenia Karpio as Tania Suárez
- Diana Díaz as Irene Moreno
- Carlos Enrique Pérez as Miguel Rodríguez
- Zuly Méndez as Federica
- María Cristina Lozada as Juana Díaz
- Alexandra Braun as Rebeca Miranda
