= Guillermo Pérez (actor) =

Venezuelan telenovela actor (born 1971)

- Born: Guillermo José Pérez Rupérez; January 28, 1971 (age 55); Caracas, Venezuela
- Occupation: Actor

Guillermo José Pérez Rupérez (born 28 January 1971) is a Venezuelan telenovela actor known for his roles in telenovelas.

== Biography ==
Guillermo began his acting career through lead roles in RCTV telenovelas.

In 2013, he joined the cast of the telenovela De Todas Maneras Rosa to play the role of Raúl.

== Telenovelas ==
- Niña Mimada (1998) as Vladimir Mogollón
- Luisa Fernanda (1999) as Rodolfo Arismendi
- Hechizo de Amor (2000) as Gabriel Salazar
- Soledad (2001) as Miguel Ángel Olivares
- La mujer de Lorenzo (2003) as Lorenzo
- Sabor a ti (2004) as Darío Antonetti
- Y los declaro marido y mujer(2006) as Valentin Ferrari/Participation espacial/
- Mi prima Ciela (2007) as Rafael Rengifo
- Libres como el viento (2009/2010) as Dioniso
- La mujer perfecta (2010/2011) as Ruben
- Nacer contigo (2012) as Pleberio Fuentes
- De Todas Maneras Rosa (2013) as Raúl
