= La Cuaima =

- Genre: Telenovela
- Created by: Carlos Pérez
- Written by: Carlos Pérez; Ana Teresa Sosa; Julio César Marmol; Verónica Álvarez; Carolina Mata
- Directed by: Olegario Barrera; Otto Rodríguez; Arturo Páez
- Creative director: Rosa Helena Arcaya
- Starring: Catherine Correia; Jonathan Montenegro; Juan Carlos Alarcón; Chantal Baudaux; Luis Fernández; Julie Restifo; Luis Gerardo Núñez
- Opening theme: "Soy mujer" performed by La India
- Country of origin: Venezuela
- Original language: Spanish
- No. of episodes: 130

Production
- Executive producer: Jhonny Pulido
- Producers: Mileyba Álvarez; Hernando Faría; Ifigenia Rivas; Teddy Mavare
- Production location: Caracas
- Cinematography: Juan González; Rafael Marín; Julio Falcón
- Editor: Ray Suárez

Original release
- Network: Radio Caracas Televisión
- Release: August 6, 2003 – February 9, 2004

Related
- Trapos íntimos; ¡Qué buena se puso Lola!

La Cuaima, also known as Carmencita, la Cuaima, is a Venezuelan telenovela created by Carlos Pérez that premiered on Radio Caracas Televisión on August 6, 2003, and ended on February 9, 2004. It stars Catherine Correia as the titular character.

== Cast ==
=== Main ===
- Catherine Correia as Carmen "Carmencita" Meléndez
- Jonathan Montenegro as Simón Alvarenga
- Juan Carlos Alarcón as Juan Pescao
- Chantal Baudaux as Alfonsina Russo / La Nena
- Luis Fernández as Cristo Jesús Guédez
- Julie Restifo as Arminda Rovaina de Cáceres
- Luis Gerardo Núñez as Basilio Alvarenga

=== Recurring ===
- Ámbar Díaz as Yamileth Cáceres Rovaina
- Flor Elena González as Pepita Hamilton de Alvarenga
- Margarita Hernández as Luisa Russo
- Javier Valcárcel as Cruz Esteban Guédez
- Juan Carlos Tarazona as Leonardo José "Leo" Cáceres Rovaina
- Juliet Lima as Daysi Chacón
- Vito Lonardo as Don Piero Russo
- Alejandro Otero as Celso Russo
- Gioia Arismendi as Maigualida Campos
- Aura Rivas as Matea Guaramato
- Maria Alejandra Colón as Carolina "Caro" de Russo
- Ligia Petit as Elda Ramírez
- Kimberly Dos Ramos as Bambi Cáceres Rovaina
- Gabriel López as Coco O'Brian
- Dora Mazzone as Modesta Meléndez
- Carlos Arreaza as Alexis Barragán
- Victoria Robert as Elvia / La Comadre
- Leopoldo Regnault as Comisario Montoya
- Marcos Campos as Emilio
