= Kiara (singer) =

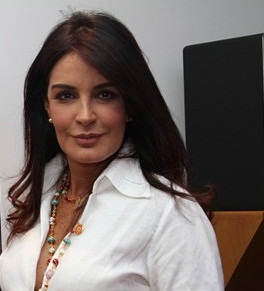
- Kiara in 2014

Background information
- Born: Gloria Sabrina Gómez Delgado; May 14, 1962 (age 64); Barquisimeto, Venezuela
- Genres: Latin pop
- Occupations: Singer-songwriter, actress
- Years active: 1987–present
- Label: Rodven

Gloria Sabrina Gómez Delgado (born May 14, 1962) is a Venezuelan singer, composer, actress, lawyer and TV presenter known by her professional name Kiara.

== Life and career ==
Kiara was born in Barquisimeto, Venezuela. She took her first steps into the entertainment world when she joined her school choir, but because of her distinctive, powerful voice, the rest of the members didn't feel she blended in well and wasn't allowed to stay in their musical ensemble. However, her love for music remained a part of her life and she would constantly sing for her friends, backed up with a guitar. After graduating from UCAB's law school in Caracas, she decided to pursue a recording career.

One day, a friend talked her into recording a demo tape and submitting it to the two biggest record labels, Sonografica and SonoRodven in Venezuela. At first, she was to be signed to Sonografica. But a coincidental interaction with famous singer, songwriter and producer Rudy La Scala changed it all. As Kiara explains, her visual and singing caught the attention of La Scala. He immediately showed her how impressed he was with her and wanted her to sing the songs he had written. She accepted to record and produce with La Scala and was quickly signed to SonoRodven for the recording of her debut album in 1987. Before the album's release, she was told she had to pick a stage name out of five options that were presented to her. She was going to use her actual name Sabrina, but the company thought it would lead to confusion with Italian singer Sabrina. The name Kiara was presented to her and she immediately picked it, as it is from a Venezuelan native (indigenous) Princess from the state of Yaracuy, not too far from where the singer was born.

In over 20 years, she has recorded six successful studio albums exploring different genres such as Latin pop, rock, ballads and even boleros. She also performed in some of the most important musical events in Latin America, including the Viña del Mar International Song Festival.

Besides her singing career, she has acted in several telenovelas in various Latin American countries, hosted different TV shows and even coached contestants on televised singing competitions.

== Discography ==
=== Albums ===
Year	Album	Singles
1987	Kiara	"Yo Pensé Que Tú"; "Que Bello"; "Deskarado"; "Después De Ti"
1990	Buscando Pelea	"Es El Amor"; "Con Mi Cara Tan Lavada"; "Quiero Un Angel"; "De Nuevo Estoy Temblando"
1992	Como Un Huracán	"Libérame"; "Baila Conmigo"; "Que Suba La Temperatura"; "Azúcar"
1995	Luna De Plata	"Luna de Plata"; "Nadie Como Tu"; "Hey, Hey"
1997	Corazón De Contrabando	"Cada Dos Días"; "Raro"
2002	Amores Perdidos	"Besos De Fuego"; "Cenizas"
2010	Como La Primera Vez	"Perdoname"

=== Singles ===
Year	Song	Hot Latin Songs	Latin Pop Airplay	Album
1988	"Que Bello"	31	-	Kiara
1989	"Deskarado"	34	-	Kiara
1990	"Tesoro Mío (with Guillermo Dávila)"	3	-	Non-album track
1990	"Con Mi Cara Tan Lavada"	35	-	Buscando Pelea
1991	"De Nuevo Estoy Temblando"	28	-	Buscando Pelea
1992	"Libérame"	19	-	Como Un Huracán
1993	"Que Suba La Temperatura"	21	-	Como Un Huracán
1995	"Luna De Plata (My One And Only)"	26	2	Luna De Plata
1995	"Nadie Como Tu"	-	13	Luna De Plata

The song Luna De Plata (My One And Only) was originally recorded by Thomas Anders (of Modern Talking fame) in 1992 on his album Down on Sunset.

== Selected filmography ==
- 2016: Piel salvaje ... Patricia de Aragón de la Rosa
- 2008: Nadie me dirá como quererte .... Laura Carbonell
- 2006: Te tengo en salsa .... Azalea Montiel De Perroni
- 2006: Y los declaro marido y mujer .... Lola
- 2005: Amor a Palos .... Patricia Lara
- 2004: Estrambotica Anastasia .... Bromelia de Borosfky
- 2003: La mujer de Judas .... Laura Briceño
- 2000: Amantes de Luna Llena .... Lorena Santamaría
- 1998: Reina de corazones .... Luisa Elena
- 1992: Macarena .... Macarena
