= Camaleona =

2007 Venezuelan telenovela

- Genre: Telenovela
- Written by: Carolina Espada
- Directed by: Otto Rodríguez; Arturo Páez
- Starring: Juliet Lima; Daniel Elbittar; Sheyene Gerardi; Dad Dáger; Karl Hoffman; Marianela González
- Country of origin: Venezuela
- Original language: Spanish
- No. of episodes: 116

Production
- Executive producer: Carlos Lamus Alcalá
- Producers: Marco Godoy; Elide Peña Troconis; Rinixa Azócar
- Production locations: Caracas, Venezuela
- Editor: Alexis Montero

Original release
- Network: RCTV
- Release: March 14 – November 6, 2007

Related
- Y los declaro marido y mujer; Toda una dama

Camaleona is a Venezuelan telenovela produced by Carlos Lamus Alcalá for Radio Caracas Televisión in 2007.

Juliet Lima and Daniel Elbittar star as the main protagonists, Dad Dáger, Karl Hoffman and Marianela González star as the main antagonists and Sheyene Gerardi as the villain.

== Cast ==
- Juliet Lima as Natalia Rivas / Elena / María Moñitos
- Daniel Elbittar as Juan Pablo Alcántara
- Dad Dáger as Claudia Ferrari / Octavia Ferrari
- Karl Hoffman as Reynaldo Luzardo
- Marianela González as Mercedes Luzardo
- Ezequiel Stremiz as Luis Felipe Alcántara
- Juan Carlos Alarcón as Leopoldo Tovar y Tovar III
- Sheyene Gerardi as Susana Rincón
- Marco Antonio Alcalá as Raimundo "Rambó" Borregales
- Mayra Alejandra as Amapola "Pola" Rivas
- Cayito Aponte as José Ignacio Rivas
- Gioia Arismendi as Olga Carolina "Olguita" Luzardo
- Relú Cardozo as María Cecilia
- Albi De Abreu as Gustavo Casanova
- Guillermo García as Ignacio "Iñaqui" Lofiego Rivas
- Juan Carlos Gardié as Vittorio "Vitto" Lofiego
- Alessandra Guilarte as Sofia
- Simón Gómez as Rolito
- Crisbel Henriquez as Flor Rivas
- Carmen Alicia Lara as Mariángel "Gel" Lofiego Rivas
- Romina Fernandes Russa as Esther
- Deyalit López as Astrid Hernández
- Cesar D' La Torre as Eduardo
