= Laura Chimaras =

Venezuelan writer

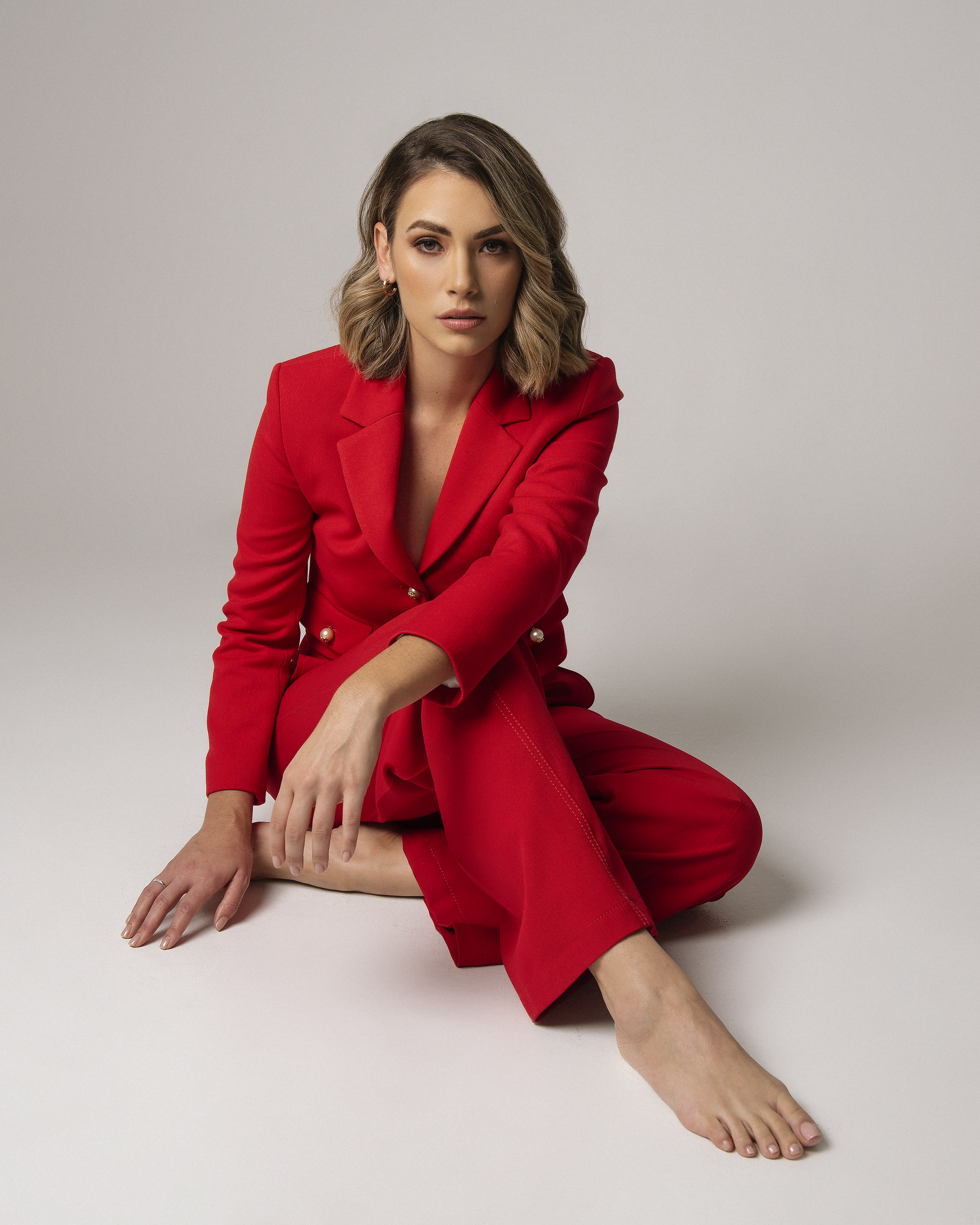
- Born: Laura Ariana Chimaras Martí; 8 May 1991 (age 33); Caracas, Venezuela
- Occupation(s): Writer and poet
- Parent: Yanis Chimaras
- Website: laurachimaras.com

Laura Ariana Chimaras Martí (born 8 May 1991) is a Venezuelan writer and poet, daughter of the actor Yanis Chimaras. She started acting at the age of eight, and at age seventeen she assumed the protagonist role of the RCTV produced drama Libres como el Viento. She has acted in eleven soap operas, three movies and over ten stage works. In 2016 she starts working in the next television series of Telemundo. As of 2021, she wrote her fifth book, called "Never Lose Faith"

== Television roles ==
Year	Title	Role	Notes
2006	Túkiti, crecí de una	Amaranta	109 episodes
2007	Toda una dama	Ashley Rincón	
2008	Nadie me dirá como quererte	Ana Teresa Galindo	
2009	Libres como el viento	Fabiola Azcárate	
2011	El árbol de Gabriel	Julieta Fernández Iturria	
2014	La virgen de la calle	Jessika Gala	
2015	Tu volverás	Daniela Cruz / Natalia Cruz	
2017	La Fan	Renata Izaguirre	7 episodes
2017–2018	Sangre de mi tierra	Serena Zambrano	57 episodes
2018	Mi familia perfecta	Rosa Guerrero	
