= Dora Mazzone =

Venezuelan actress (born 1966)

- Born: Dora Paula Mazzone León; 2 June 1966 (age 60); Caracas, Venezuela
- Occupation: Actress

Dora Mazzone (born 2 June 1966) is a Venezuelan actress.

== Biography ==
Dora began her career in theatre by performing stage readings. In 1984, she entered the School of Arts at the Central University of Venezuela. During the course of her studies, she participated in various stage plays in English, French, Italian and Spanish.

Her first acting breakthrough was in 1990 when she was selected to participate in the film by Román Chalbaud titled Cuchillos de fuego.

Dora has a daughter named Graziella Simancas Mazzone from her marriage with actor Jean Carlo Simancas.

== Filmography ==
- Corazón Esmeralda (2014) as Hortensia Palacios
- Mi ex me tiene ganas (2012) as Petra Paris
- Natalia del Mar (2011) as Pasionaría López
- Nadie me dirá como quererte (2008) as Antonia de Aristigueta
- Y los declaro marido y mujer (2006) as Rosa Segarra de Mujica
- Amor a Palos (2005) as
- Ser Bonita No Basta (2005) as
- Punto y raya (2004) as Ana María
- Estrambotica Anastasia (2004) as Agripina Samaniego de Borosfky
- La Cuaima (2003) as Modesta Meléndez
- Mi Gorda Bella (2002) as Angelica
- La mujer de Judas (2002) as Chichita Agüero del Toro
- La niña de mis ojos (2001) as Paula
- A Calzón Quitao (2001) as Paula
- Viva la Pepa (2001) as Yiya de Bencecry
- Mariú (2000) as Tibizaida Morales (antagonist)
- Luisa Fernanda (1999) as Alicia Suárez
- Niña Mimada (1998) as Rosalía
- Maria de los Angeles (1997) as
- Aire Libre (1996) as Ana Villahermosa
- Sucre (1996) as Manuelita Sáenz
- Volver a Vivir (1996) as Mónica Guffanti
- Amores de Fin de Siglo (1995) as La mujer policía girana
- Entrega total (1995) as Trujillo
- Despedida de soltera (1995)
- Señora Bolero (1993)
- De Oro Puro (1993) as Virginia Cusiel
- Dulce Ilusión (1993) as Egleé Bustillo
- Por Estas Calles (1992) as Cecilia Matos
- Caribe (1990) as Aminta
- Disparen a matar (1990) as Gabriela
- Cuchillos de fuego (1990)
