= Miss Venezuela 1998 =

1998 beauty pageant in Caracas, Venezuela

- Date: September 11, 1998
- Presenters: Guillermo Dávila; Maite Delgado
- Entertainment: Enrique Iglesias
- Venue: Poliedro de Caracas, Caracas, Venezuela
- Broadcaster: Venevision
- Entrants: 30
- Placements: 10
- Winner: Carolina Indriago; Delta Amacuro
- Photogenic: Verónica Schneider; Monagas

Miss Venezuela 1998 was the 45th Miss Venezuela pageant, was held in Caracas, Venezuela, on September 11, 1998, after weeks of events. The winner of the pageant was Carolina Indriago, Miss Delta Amacuro.

The pageant was broadcast live on Venevision from the Poliedro de Caracas in Caracas, Venezuela. At the conclusion of the final night of competition, outgoing titleholder Veruska Ramírez crowned Carolina Indriago as the new Miss Venezuela. 30 delegates competed for the crown.

== Results ==
=== Placements ===
Placement	Contestant	International Placement
Miss Venezuela 1998	Delta Amacuro – Carolina Indriago	Top 5 – Miss Universe 1999
Miss Venezuela World 1998	Monagas – Verónica Schneider	Unplaced –Miss World 1998
Miss Venezuela International 1998	Miranda – Bárbara Pérez	Did Not Compete
Top 10	Amazonas – Angélica Guvernez; Carabobo – Olga Fridegotto; Cojedes – Jennifer Jordán; Paraguaná Peninsula – Daira Lambis; Táchira – Johanna Grimaldo; Trujillo – Elsy Barrios; Zulia – Cinzia Coletta	

=== Special awards ===
- Miss Photogenic (voted by press reporters) – Verónica Schneider (Miss Monagas)
- Miss Internet (voted by www.missvenezuela.com viewers) – Mayela Mora (Miss Aragua)
- Miss Congeniality (voted by Miss Venezuela contestants) – Elsy Barrios (Miss Trujillo)
- Miss Figure – Carolina Indriago (Miss Delta Amacuro)
- Best Hair – Johanna Grimaldo (Miss Táchira)
- Best Smile – Verónica Schneider (Miss Monagas)
- Most beautiful Eyes – Daira Lambis (Miss Península de Paraguaná)
- Best Skin – Bárbara Pérez (Miss Miranda)
- Miss Elegance – Carolina Indriago (Miss Delta Amacuro)
- Best Legs – Ana Carolina Butragueño (Miss Portuguesa)

== Contestants ==
The Miss Venezuela 1998 delegates are:

State	Contestant	Age	Height	Hometown
Amazonas	Angélica Guvernez Serrano	22	183 cm (6 ft 0 in)	Caracas
Anzoátegui	Maria Elena Chacón García	23	178 cm (5 ft 10 in)	Barcelona
Apure	Nacira Bertolotto Villalón	19	178 cm (5 ft 10 in)	Caracas
Aragua	Mayela de los Angeles Mora Pinto	19	176 cm (5 ft 9 1/2 in)	Maracay
Barinas	Angie Lilia Pérez Capobianco	19	176 cm (5 ft 9 1/2 in)	Baruta
Bolívar	Carla Meinhard Contasti	22	179 cm (5 ft 10 1/2 in)	Ciudad Bolívar
Carabobo	Olga María Fridegotto Unda	19	178 cm (5 ft 10 in)	Valencia
Cojedes	Jennifer Jordán Machado	18	176 cm (5 ft 9 1/2 in)	Caracas
Costa Oriental	María Isabel Ojeda Ocando	20	178 cm (5 ft 10 in)	Cabimas
Delta Amacuro	Lucbel Carolina Indriago Pinto	18	183 cm (6 ft 0 in)	Valencia
Dependencias Federales	María Eugenia Bustamante Hernández	21	178 cm (5 ft 10 in)	San Cristóbal
Distrito Federal	Kuimby Karina Lorenzo Vascotto	17	179 cm (5 ft 10 1/2 in)	Caracas
Falcón	Maria Gabriela Carrillo Trujillo	19	179 cm (5 ft 10 1/2 in)	Maracay
Guárico	Jenny Yatruska Albanesse Mitchell	22	176 cm (5 ft 9 1/2 in)	Caracas
Lara	Andreina Beatriz Sastre Montoya	21	174 cm (5 ft 8 1/2 in)	Barquisimeto
Mérida	Daniella Abecasis Rivers	21	175 cm (5 ft 9 in)	Valencia
Miranda	Bárbara Leticia Pérez Rangel	18	176 cm (5 ft 9 1/2 in)	San Cristóbal
Monagas	Verónica Schneider Rodríguez	19	177 cm (5 ft 9 1/2 in)	Caracas
Municipio Libertador	Eugenia Malpica Ayala	19	180 cm (5 ft 11 in)	Caracas
Municipio San Francisco	Keyla Carolina Medina Martínez	19	181 cm (5 ft 11 1/2 in)	Maracaibo
Nueva Esparta	Carolina Sulaima Bali Mardelli	21	173 cm (5 ft 8 in)	Maracaibo
Península Goajira	Keyla Vanessa Alarcón Suárez	20	174 cm (5 ft 8 1/2 in)	Maracaibo
Península de Paraguaná	Daira del Carmen Lambis de Ávila	21	177 cm (5 ft 9 1/2 in)	Los Teques
Portuguesa	Ana Carolina Butrageño Londoño	19	180 cm (5 ft 11 in)	Caracas
Sucre	Damarys Thais Ojeda Bracoviche	18	178 cm (5 ft 10 in)	Caracas
Táchira	Johanna Danerys Grimaldo Castro	20	176 cm (5 ft 9 1/2 in)	San Cristóbal
Territorio Federal Vargas	Cindy Margarita Morales Toyo	20	176 cm (5 ft 9 1/2 in)	Cabimas
Trujillo	Elsy Beatriz Barrios Figuera	24	173 cm (5 ft 8 in)	Caracas
Yaracuy	Carolina Dell'Orso Ruiz	18	177 cm (5 ft 9 1/2 in)	Valencia
Zulia	Cinzia Cristina Coletta Mantecón	24	175 cm (5 ft 9 in)	Maracaibo

Notes

- Carolina Indriago was placed as 3rd runner-up in Miss Universe 1999 in Chaguaramas, Trinidad and Tobago.
- Veronica Schneider was unplaced at Miss World 1998 in Seychelles. Later, she became a successful soap opera actress.
- Barbara Perez never made it to Miss International. By the time she had to compete, the 1999 Miss Venezuela pageant had already taken place. Andreina Llamozas was sent instead.
- Daira Lambis won Reinado Internacional del Café 1999 in Manizales, Colombia. She was also placed as 1st runner-up in Reina Sudamericana 1998 in Santa Cruz, Bolivia.
- Angie Perez (Barinas) and Johanna Grimaldo (Tachira) competed in the 2000 pageant "Miss Republica Bolivariana de Venezuela".
