= Nacer contigo =

Venezuelan television drama series

- Genre: Telenovela
- Created by: José Simón Escalona
- Based on: La Celestina by Fernando de Rojas
- Written by: Iris Dubs; Karin Valecillos; José Simón Escalona; Daniel Alfonso Rojas
- Directed by: Luis Gaitán
- Creative director: Óscar Escobar
- Starring: Emma Rabbe; Guillermo Pérez; Nacarid Escalona; Jerónimo Gil; Josette Vidal; Lasso
- Opening theme: "Te veo" performed by Lasso
- Country of origin: Venezuela
- Original language: Spanish
- No. of episodes: 120

Production
- Executive producer: María Eugenia Marrero
- Producer: Marco Godoy
- Production locations: Caracas; Los Roques
- Editor: Karen Rodríguez
- Camera setup: Multi-camera

Original release
- Network: Televen
- Release: 22 February – 17 July 2012

Nacer contigo is a Venezuela telenovela created by José Simón Escalona for Televen, based on the play La Celestina of Fernando de Rojas. It premiered on 22 February 2012 and ended on 17 July 2012.

The series stars Emma Rabbe as Alina, Guillermo Pérez as Pleberio, Nacarid Escalona as Celeste Rojas, Jerónimo Gil as Caín Bermúdez, Josette Vidal as Melibea Fuentes and Lasso as Calixto Sánchez.

== Cast ==
=== Primary ===
- Emma Rabbe as Alina
- Guillermo Pérez as Pleberio
- Nacarid Escalona as Celeste Rojas
- Jerónimo Gil as Caín Bermúdez
- Josette Vidal as Melibea Fuentes
- Lasso as Calixto Sánchez

=== Secondary ===
- Verónica Ortíz as Florencia
- Catherina Cardozo as Belinda
- Mayra Africano as Mercedes Mata
- Gonzalo Velutini - Fernando Gael
- Emmanuel Palomares as Miguel Ángel
- Sandra Díaz as Areúsa Rodríguez
- Eben Renán as Centurio Ortíz
- Ángel Casallas as Pármeno Mata
- José Medina as Anselmo
- Oriana Colmenares as Lucrecia
- Samantha González as Elicia
- Ángel David Díaz as Sempronio
- Marco Pérez as Seba
- Ángel Cueva as Jordi
- Diego Sánchez as Pedro Pan
- Gabriel Mantilla as Gabo
