= Mi lista de exes =

- Genre: Romantic comedy
- Based on: Mytological Ex by Sigal Avin
- Written by: Alfredo Alejandro; Fercho Nolla
- Directed by: Alejandro Ricaño
- Starring: Adriana Montes de Oca; Christopher Aguilasocho; Paola Fernández; Marcos Radosh
- Opening theme: "Lista de exes" by Luisa Nicholls
- Country of origin: Mexico
- Original language: Spanish
- No. of seasons: 1
- No. of episodes: 13

Production
- Executive producer: Inna Payán
- Production company: Televisa

Original release
- Network: Las Estrellas
- Release: 30 August – 22 November 2018

Mi lista de exes is a Mexican romantic comedy television series that aired on Las Estrellas from 30 August 2018 to 22 November 2018. Produced by Inna Payán for Televisa, based on the Israeli series Mythological Ex written by Sigal Avin. It stars Adriana Montes de Oca, Christopher Aguilasocho, Paola Fernández and Marcos Radosh. The series narrates the story of Maria, a young woman who is in search for the love of her life.

== Plot ==
María (Adriana Montes de Oca), is an impulsive young woman who seeks the love of her life. In her journey to find him, she resorts to the help of a tarot reader, who tells her that her love is not in the future, but in the past, and she already knows him. In addition, she warns her that if for her 30th birthday, she has not rediscovered the love of her life, she will lose every opportunity to find him. With these warnings, María will undertake a desperate search to find love, with the help of her best friends: Pedro (Christopher Aguilasocho), Ana (Paola Fernández) and Lolo (Marcos Radosh), and thus create her list of exes.

== Cast ==
- Adriana Montes de Oca as María, she works as a voice actress but the only thing she wants at this moment in her life is to find her soul mate. She thinks that the only thing she lacks in life is to find the love of her life
- Christopher Aguilasocho as Pedro, he is an actor, although he really works as an extra. His dream is to be a famous actor, but he is really looking to cover his problems of insecurity and shyness.
- Paola Fernández as Ana, she has known Maria since high school. She is self-confident and very sexually open and was a beauty queen, Miss Nuevo León, although she denies it.
- Marcos Radosh as Lolo, he is openly gay and was in the closet until he was 20 years old. He is afraid of falling in love because they will hurt him, like his first love.
- Claudia Ramírez as Sonia, María's mother

== Episodes ==
No.	Title	Original release date
1	"El Chef"	30 August 2018
María fails again in love, which makes her hysterical. María seeks the love of her life among her ex-boyfriends, thanks to what a tarot reader tells her. The first ex is Juan Miguel, who seduces her with food, but he is about to get married. Guest stars: José Ron as Juan Miguel, Gloria Izaguirre as Taroísta
2	"El Cantante"	6 September 2018
María discovers that her ex, Carlos, is now Caleb, an attractive fashion singer who is viral on the internet, what María ignores is that not only is he her ex, but also Ana's ex, which generates a great conflict between them. Guest stars: Hugo Catalán as Carlos/Caleb, Daniel Haddad as Lucas
3	"El Chacal"	13 September 2018
Poncho is a stripper, an uneducated guy, a true sex teacher, a "chacal" in the words of Lolo. When he arrives at María's house, he raises Pedro's envy for his sculptural body. María finds it difficult to resist the charms of Poncho. Guest stars: Alejandro Nones as Poncho, Daniel Haddad as Lucas
4	"El Pintor"	20 September 2018
María decides to go ahead with her list of exes, so she looks for Fabián, an eccentric, bohemian and mature painter. María will realize the great difference that exists between them, when she imagines that she is dating someone like her dad. Guest star: Juan Carlos Remolina as Fabián
5	"El Extranjero"	27 September 2018
Sebastián, the Colombian ex, will make a proposal to María difficult to refuse, but her friends will cause her to debate between love or leave everything. Guest stars: Albi De Abreu as Sebastián, Daniel Haddad as Lucas, Claudia Martín as Natalia
6	"La "Amiga""	4 October 2018
Natalia arrives in Mexico determined to claim her place on María's list. When she learns that María is about to go to Colombia, Natalia reappears to remind her of her love as a friend and the one they had as a couple, even though María is reluctant to accept it. Guest stars: Claudia Martín as Natalia, Albi De Abreu as Sebastián
7	"El Piloto"	11 October 2018
María hides from love in the men's bathroom, where she meets by chance with her ex Antonio. Antonio is divorced and María is the first person with whom he goes out after separating, he has never been able to forget his ex, with whom he has a stormy communication. Guest stars: Juan Pablo Medina as Antonio, Natalia Guerrero as Marina, Daniel Haddad as Lucas
8	"El Feo"	18 October 2018
María met Lalo when he was ugly on a blind date, but he managed to conquer her. Now he is an international model that will subject María to a harsh regime as revenge. Guest stars: Roberto Quijano as Lalo, Natalia Guerrero as Marina, Daniel Haddad as Lucas
9	"El Ginecólogo"	25 October 2018
María spies on Gama and finds that he is an attractive gynecologist, single and that his mother no longer bothers him. So, using the turtle, Fanny, daughter in common with him, María gets a romantic date, in which she discovers that Gama does not like women anymore. Guest stars: Mauricio Isaac as Gama, Armando Espitia as Young Gama, Daniel Haddad as Lucas, José Luis Cordero as Papá Lolo
10	"El Hermanastro"	1 November 2018
When María is unemployed, her friends connect her with her former stepbrother Alex, director of a dubbing studio, ignoring that in addition to family, they were secretly engaged. Guest stars: Juan Diego Covarrubias as Alejandro Jr., Rodrigo Murray as Alejandro Sr., Daniel Haddad as Lucas
11	"El Papá"	8 November 2018
Fernando was the bad guy, rebellious and daring who returns to Maria to have a romantic date, but he is accompanied by Mateo, his son who is a devil in power. Guest stars: Mariano Palacios as Fernando, Ezequiel Caballero as Mateo
12	"El que la cortó por Whats"	15 November 2018
María is about to turn thirty and believes that looking for her exes was stupid, so she decides to end the search. But when Oswaldo looks for her, she will go out with him to complain for breaking up with her on WhatsApp, without knowing that he suffered an accident. Guest stars: Lenny de la Rosa as Oswaldo, Daniel Haddad as Lucas
13	"El Luchador"	22 November 2018
After her birthday celebration, María and her friends decide not to give attention to any of her exes. But she needs to see the last ex-boyfriend on her list, the wrestler, Renato. It will be very difficult to find him, so much, that María will find him too late. Guest stars: Faisy as Renato, Hugo Catalán as Carlos, Albi De Abreu as Sebastián, Lenny de la Rosa as Oswaldo
