= Hugo Vásquez =

Venezuelan actor (born 1976)

Hugo Vásquez (born March 5, 1976) is a Venezuelan actor. He is known for his role as the charismatic police Jordi Rosales in the telenovela Mi Gorda Bella.

== Filmography ==
=== TV series ===
- Amantes de luna llena (2000)
- Guerra de mujeres (2001), Gregory the barkeeper)
- Juana la Virgen (2002), famous model)
- Mi Gorda Bella (2002-2003), Jordi Rosales)
- La Invasora (2003), José Miguel Briceño)
- Ser Bonita No Basta (2005), Orlando Álvarez)
- Amor a Palos (2005), Tamanaco Pelavo)
- Y los declaro marido y mujer(2006), Gustavo Sampedro)
- El desprecio (2006)
- Nadie me dirá cómo quererte, (2008, Gabriel Olmedo)

=== Theatre ===
- Yo no soy terrorista
- Chateando.com

=== Characters ===
- Jordi Rosales: Jordi is a young and good spirited police officer. His best friend is his roommate Franklin Carreno. He loves to dance and seems to have the rhythm in his blood. He is the genuine article; friendly, loving and confident.

== Personal life ==
Hugo Vásquez was born as Hugo Alberto Vásquez Barvo. He has three brothers; Jaime Javier, Carlos and Miguel.

Hugo is 1.88 m (6 ft 2 in) tall. The one thing he is sensitive about is his ears. He studied at the university of Zulia.

He has acted in both theatre and telenovelas. Hugo is also a model and has worked for such people as Hugo Boss, Giovanni Scutaro and Octavio Vásquez. He is also on occasions present in different events such as beauty contests.

Hugo's favorite colour is blue. His favorite food is El hervido gallina, boiled chicken. His hobby is fishing. When he wants to relax he either goes to the beach or to fish.

He is not jealous; in fact he considers himself quite tolerant and moderate. He most dislikes in people hypocrisy. He believes in both love at first sight and the institute of marriage.
