= Daniela Bascopé =

American actress

- Born: Daniela Bascopé Van Grieken; April 11, 1982 (age 42); Texas, United States
- Occupation(s): Actress, Singer

Daniela Bascopé (born Daniela Bascopé Van Grieken on 11 April 1982) is an American born Venezuelan actress and singer known for her roles in various telenovelas and films.

== Biography ==
Daniela began her career in the performing arts world with a theater group called Acto Anónimo. At the age of 15, she made her first television debut in the telenovela Samantha.

In 2007, Daniela was diagnosed with lymph cancer. After a hard process of recovery, she released a book titled VENCER Y VIVIR detailing her struggle with cancer. the book was published by Santillana publishing and became a best-seller in Venezuela.

In 2010, Bascopé got her first protagonist role in the telenovela Harina de Otro Costal.

In 2011, she obtained the second starring role of her career in the telenovela El árbol de Gabriel produced by Venevisión. In the same year, she released her first music album titled Ven that featured a combination of musical styles such as bossa nova, techno and world music.

In 2013, she was cast as Corina Montoya in the RTI-Televisa-RCTV production Las Bandidas.

She released her second album titled Tengo Remedio in April 2013.

== Filmography ==
Films roles
Year	Title	Roles	Notes
TBA	King of the Party	Adela	Post-production

Television roles
Year	Title	Roles	Notes
1998	Samantha	Anabela	
1999	Toda mujer	Elizabeth Tariffi Martínez	
2001	La soberana	Chery Benavides	
2003	Engañada	Gabriela Inés Reyes Valderrama	
2005	El amor las vuelve locas	Rosaura	
2006–2007	Ciudad Bendita	Fedora Palacios	
2009	La vida entera	Natalia Montoya	
2010	Harina de otro costal	Valentina Fernandez	Main role; 60 episodes
2011–2012	El árbol de Gabriel	Magdalena Miranda	Main role; 171 episodes
2013	Las Bandidas	Corina Montoya	Main role; 117 episodes
2016–2017	La Doña	Valeria Puertas	Main role; 120 episodes
2018	Al otro lado del muro	Jennifer Suárez	Main role; 78 episodes
2020–2021	100 días para enamorarnos	Isabel Morales	Main role; 92 episodes

== Discography ==
- Ven (2011)
- Tango Remedio (2013)
