= La Traicionera =

Colombian telenovela

- Genre: Telenovela
- Based on: Malparida by Adrián Suar
- Written by: Aura Niño; Rodrigo Holguin; Faber Soto
- Story by: Adrián Suar
- Directed by: Lilo Vilaplana; Cecilia Vásquez
- Creative director: Rosario Lozano
- Starring: Marianela González; Juan Manuel Mendoza; Víctor Mallarino
- Theme music composer: Jaime R. Echavarría
- Opening theme: "Traicionera" by Jorge Cárdenas
- Country of origin: Colombia
- Original language: Spanish
- No. of episodes: 267

Production
- Executive producer: Óscar Guarín
- Producer: Amparo López
- Production location: Bogotá
- Cinematography: Marcos Morales; Carlos Andrés Hernández
- Camera setup: Multi-camera

Original release
- Network: RCN Televisión
- Release: November 8, 2011 – December 21, 2012

La Traicionera (transl. The Traitor) (Conniving Renata) is a Colombian telenovela produced by Fox Telecolombia to RCN Televisión in partnership with Televisa. It is based from the 2010 Argentine telenovela Malparida. Created by Adrian Suar and directed by Lilo Vilapina and Cecila Vásques. Starring Marianela González, Juan Manuel Mendoza and Victor Mallarino with Vicky Hernández and Kristina Lilley.

== Plot ==
The story begins when María Herrera, a humble, hardworking woman and single mother of Renata Medina, meets Eduardo Sanint, a successful and wealthy businessman. They fall madly in love even though he is married to Annie, with whom he also has a son: Esteban Sanint. Eduardo must decide between Maria and his family. He feels that his love for Maria is not enough to leave his family and chooses to end his relationship with her. Unbeknownst to Eduardo, Maria got pregnant during their affair. Maria decides to look for Eduardo again to tell him that she is expecting his son. When she arrives at his house, his maid Olga informs her that he has gone on a trip with his wife. Maria asks Olga to deliver a letter to Eduardo telling him the truth, but the letter does not reach Eduardo because Olga decides to make it disappear so as not to affect the marriage. When Maria gives birth, Gracia, Maria’s mother, decides to go to tell Eduardo that he is the child’s father, but she does not manage to talk to him, since Eduardo's father does not allow her to do so. Eduardo, for his part, does not want to know anything about Maria and gives her a check so that she will not return. Gracia, having no money to help her daughter, takes the check and leaves. Maria becomes depressed because of Eduardo’s rejection, and as a result her baby is born with autism and Maria decides to commit suicide. After the death of her daughter, Gracia begins to hate Manuel Herrera, her grandson and Maria's son, for carrying Eduardo Sanint's blood in his veins and provoking the death of her daughter. Because of her hatred towards Eduardo, she instills in her granddaughter Renata that she has a mission: to avenge her mother's death and to hate her brother, since he is the son of her mother's murderer. But Renata cannot hate him because he is her brother and she feels she must love him as such. Twenty years later, Renata decides to avenge her mother by using her beauty. She ends up working for Eduardo Sanint in order to seduce him. However, she then meets Esteban Sanint, Eduardo’s son, who finally steals her heart.

== Cast ==
- Marianela González as Renata Medina Herrera
- Juan Manuel Mendoza as Esteban Sanint
- Víctor Mallarino as Eduardo Sanint
- Vicky Hernández as Gracia Herrera
- Ricardo Vélez as Gabriel "El Almirante" Sanint
- Kristina Lilley as Ana María "Annie" de Sanint
- Ana Lucía Domínguez as Martina Figueroa
- José Narváez as Hernán Posada
- Paula Castaño as Esmeralda García
- Jorge Cárdenas as narcossi
- Ignacio Menéses as Manuel Herrera / Manuel Sanint Herrera
- Carla Giraldo as Vanesa Ramírez
- Mario Ruiz as Plinio
- María Fernanda Martínez as Olga
- Marcela Benjumea as Mabel
- Connie Camelo as Andrea
- Vicky Rueda as Noelia Granados
- Víctor Rodríguez as Luis
- Silvia de Dios as Marcia Posada
- Norma Nivia as Bárbara Castro
- Alberto Pujol as Hugo Troncoso
- Carlos Mariño as Padre Miguel
- Yuri Vargas as Jennifer Ramírez
- Juliana Roldan as María Herrera
- Rafael Lahera as Andrés Santamaría
- Gonzalo Vivanco as Javier Giraldo
- Leonardo Acosta as Jorge Medina
- Rita Bendeck as Laura Vallejo
- Indhira Serrano as Cristina Torres
- Julio Echeverry as Darío
- Salvatore Cassandro as Crispín
- Xilena Aycardi as Gloria
- Adelaida López as Katheryn
- Pedro Falla as Lucas Navarro
- Andrés Salazar as Francisco Brava
- Julio del Mar as Alfonso Navarro
