= Corazón traicionado =

Venezuelan telenovela

- Genre: Telenovela
- Created by: Martín Hahn
- Story by: Daniel González; Giuliana Rodríguez; Daniel Alfonzo Rojas; Martín Hahn
- Directed by: José Manuel Carvajal; Manuel Díaz Casanova; Luis Enrique Padilla
- Creative director: Javier Vidal
- Starring: Yelena Maciel; Cristóbal Lander; Norkys Batista; Caridad Canelón
- Theme music composer: José Alfonso Quiñones
- Opening theme: "Corazón traicionado" by Grupo La Marcha
- Country of origin: Venezuela
- Original language: Spanish

Production
- Executive producer: Mileyba Álvarez Barreto
- Producer: Antonio Crimaldi
- Production location: Caracas
- Production company: RCTV

Original release
- Release: August 14, 2017 – January 30, 2018

Corazón traicionado (Betrayed heart) is a Venezuelan telenovela written by Martín Hahn and produced by RCTV. The series stars Yelena Maciel, Cristóbal Lander, Norkys Batista and Caridad Canelón.

Corazón traicionado began airing in Honduras on 14 August 2017. On September 22, 2017, the telenovela debuted in Africa on the channel Eva dubbed in English and Portuguese.

== Plot ==
Lorena García discovers that her husband Guillermo is a hit man who has recently been involved in the attempted assassination of Marco Aurelio Corona, a prestigious lawyer in Caracas. After a failed attempt, Guillermo and his boss kidnap her 5-year-old son and force her to work as a nurse taking care of Marco Aurelio at his family house so that she can kill him if she wanted to see her son again. She comes face to face with Alberto, Marco Aurelio's son, who was her past love when she was a teenager working at his family's country house.

== Cast ==
=== Main ===
- Yelena Maciel as Lorena García
- Cristóbal Lander as Alberto Corona Sotillo
- Norkys Batista as Malena Corona Sotillo
- Caridad Canelón as Gertrudis Sotillo de Corona

=== Also starring ===
- Julio Alcázar as Don Lucio Trejo
- Aroldo Betancourt as Marco Aurelio Corona
- Estefanía López as Carmen Ramírez
- Gonzalo Velutini as Claudio Corona
- Saúl Marín as Alfonso Valeria
- Josette Vidal as Virginia Ramírez
- Patricia Amenta as Patricia Santana
- Claudio de la Torre as Pablo Miranda
- Ángel Casallas as Ricardo Trejo Sotillo
- Carmen Alicia Lara as Isabel Miranda
- Ángel David Díaz as Guillermo Páez
- Oriana Colmenares as María Bonita Echeverri
- Milena Santander as Paulina Sotillo de Trejo
- Margarita Hernández as María Lourdes Echeverri
- Catherina Cardozo as María Balbina Echeverri
- Violeta Alemán as Nilda Páez
- Juan Carlos Gardié as Pedro Lobo
- Mariú Favaro as Norma Ríos
- Alejandro Díaz Iacocca as Elvis Trejo Sotillo
- Xavier Muñoz as Comisario Omar González
- Graziella Mazzone as María Ángeles Echeverri
- Luigi Luciano Bonilla Dileonardo as José Pablo Miranda Corona
- Fernando E. Márquez Aristiguieta as Ignacio Páez García

== Production ==
In October 2015, it was announced that Martín Hahn was writing a new telenovela to be produced by Radio Caracas Television. Production of Corazón traicionado started on November 23, 2015.
