= El árbol de Gabriel =

- Genre: Telenovela
- Created by: Alberto Barrera Tyszka
- Written by: Alberto Barrera Tyszka; Neida Padilla; Elio Palencia; Anisbely Castillo
- Directed by: Luis Alberto Lamata
- Starring: Jorge Reyes; Daniela Bascopé; Cristóbal Lander; Roxana Díaz
- Theme music composer: Sanluis
- Opening theme: ¿Donde andabas tu? by Sanluis
- Country of origin: Venezuela
- Original language: Spanish
- No. of episodes: 171

Production
- Executive producer: Consuelo Delgado
- Producer: Lenín Feliche
- Production location: Caracas
- Cinematography: Maríam González
- Editors: Antionio Parada; Eduardo Gorrín
- Production company: Venevisión

Original release
- Network: Venevisión
- Release: September 7, 2011 – May 15, 2012

Related
- La viuda joven; Mi ex me tiene ganas

El árbol de Gabriel (English title: Gabriel's Family Tree) is a Venezuelan telenovela written by Alberto Barrera Tyszka and produced by Venevisión.

Jorge Reyes and Daniela Bascopé star as the main protagonists, while Cristobal Lander, Roxana Diaz, and Myriam Abreu star as the antagonists.

On September 7, 2011, Venevisión started broadcasting El árbol de Gabriel weekdays at 9:00 pm, replacing La viuda joven. The last episode was broadcast on May 15, 2012, with Mi ex me tiene ganas replacing it the following day.

== Plot ==
Gabriel León is a popular television personality and host of the highest rated variety show in the country El maratón de la alegria. He is married to Angie Sorelli. He is diagnosed with a serious illness requiring a transplant and he has to look for a direct relative to be a donor. Although he has no immediate family, Gabriel has a secret from the past. Years ago, he donated his sperm to a fertility clinic in order to make ends meet. Now with the help of his friends, he seeks out his biological children and in the process, he will meet five women: Magdalena, Nayarí, Valentina, Brenda, and Ana Belén.

While trying to find his biological children, Gabriel will find true love in Magdalena, a photographer. But their happiness will face various obstacles since they are both stuck in failed marriages. Magdalena's husband Agustín Camejo, who married her for her wealth and is having an affair with her best friend Sofía, will not allow her to leave him for Gabriel, while Angie will do anything to keep her husband by her side. Also, Sofía and Agustín have a secret of their own, he lied to Magdalena that she was inseminated with his sperm when it was actually from a donor, who later happens to be Gabriel. The new branches in Gabriel's family tree will change his life, and he will have to change his priorities and perspectives in life, as well as fighting for his one true love.

== Cast ==
=== Main ===
- Jorge Reyes as Gabriel León Ruíz
- Daniela Bascopé as Magdalena Miranda de Camejo

=== Also main ===
- Nohely Arteaga as Valentina Pacheco
- Aroldo Betancourt as Efraín Fernández
- Roxana Díaz as Sofía Alvarado
- Cristóbal Lander as Agustín Camejo
- Roque Valero as Epicúreo "Epi" Morales / Carmen Garcés
- Elaiza Gil as Nayarí Rosales
- Alfonso Medina as Antonio "Toño" Gualtero
- Laura Chimaras as Julieta Fernández Iturria
- Myriam Abreu as Angie Sorelli de León
- Lourdes Valera as Bárbara Miranda
- Beatriz Vázquez as Ana Belén Iturria de Fernández
- Eulalia Siso as Amelia Ruíz de León

=== Secondary cast ===
- Paula Woyzechowsky as Gloria Falcón
- Rhandy Piñango as Ricardo Arismendi
- Erika Santiago as Marilyn González
- Mariely Ortega as Brenda Sánchez
- José Ramón Barreto as Deibis Rosales
- Sindy Lazo as Patricia Picón
- José Manuel Suárez as Maikel Blanco
- Vanessa Di Quattro as Dilenis Barreto
- Greisy Mena as Zuleika
- Gabriel López as Saúl Navas "Seis Nueve"
- Sebastián Quevedo as Rodrigo Camejo Miranda
- Diego Villarroel as William Guillermo Sánchez
- Edgard Serrano as Dr. Martínez
- Franci Otazo as Fanny
- Jenny Valdés as Irma
- Romelia Agüero as Lucrecia
- Alejandro Corona as Miguel Calixto Jamer
- Hernán Iturbe Decan as Joaquín
- Irene Delgado as Melanie
- Héctor Manrique as Merlín
- Virginia Lancaster as Virginia

=== Special participation ===
- Carlos Cruz as Maximiliano Reyes
- Diosa Canales as Herself
