= Enrique Palacios =

Venezuelan model

- Born: May 22, 1975 (age 49)
- Spouse: Veronica Schneider
- Children: 2

Enrique Palacios (born May 22, 1975, in Caracas, Venezuela) is a fashion model best known for his campaigns for Armani, Tommy Hilfiger and Dolce & Gabbana. He is also known for having had a relationship with British supermodel Naomi Campbell.

Palacios began his career in 1995, when an agent from Karin Models France approached him, and proposed the idea of modeling in France. He became the face of Armani Code cologne. In 2005, along with Gabriel Aubry, Jason Shaw, Mark Vanderloo and Alex Lundqvist, he appeared in an issue of L'Uomo Vogue, photographed by Walter Chin, in an article covering the most successful male models.

Palacios is married to the model and actress Verónica Schneider and has two children Sarah and David.
