= Al otro lado del muro =

American telenovela

- Genre: Telenovela
- Created by: Laura Sosa
- Directed by: Nicolás Di Blasi; Luis Manzo
- Starring: Marjorie de Sousa; Litzy; Gabriel Porras; Adriana Barraza
- Music by: Juan Cammarano; Elik Alvarez
- Country of origin: United States
- Original language: Spanish
- No. of seasons: 1
- No. of episodes: 78

Production
- Executive producers: David Posada; Carmen Cecilia Urbaneja
- Producer: Aimee Godinez
- Cinematography: Joseph Martínez; Argemiro Saavedra
- Editor: Ellery Albarran
- Camera setup: Multi-camera
- Production companies: Argos Comunicación; Telemundo Global Studios

Original release
- Network: Telemundo
- Release: 21 February – 11 June 2018

Al otro lado del muro (in English: On the Other Side of the Wall) is a Spanish-language telenovela produced by Telemundo Global Studios and Argos Comunicación that premiered on Telemundo on 21 February 2018, and concluded on 11 June 2018. The series revolves around two women, one of humble origin and the other a prominent figure, who cross from Mexico to the United States to remake their lives.

== Plot ==
The story follows the lives of two women, one of humble origin and the other a prominent figure, who cross the border from Mexico to the United States for different reasons: one chasing a dream and the other fleeing a nightmare. In this contemporary series, which reflects the reality of many emigrants, both women will have to do the impossible to move their children forward and survive, leaving behind everything they knew until then.

== Cast ==
=== Main characters ===
- Marjorie de Sousa as Sofía Villavicencio, is an ex beauty queen, married to Governor Ernesto Martínez.
- Litzy as Eliza Romero, she is a professional baker, married to Max Sullivan.
- Gabriel Porras as Ernesto Martínez, he is the governor of one of the states of Mexico.
- Adriana Barraza as Carmen Rosales de Romero, she is Eliza's mother. She is a patriotic woman who loves her country and her culture.

=== Recurring characters ===
- Uriel del Toro as Andrés Suárez, a generous and supportive man. Andrés arrived in the United States with his wife, María, escaping the violence of the drug world.
- Guillermo Iván as Joel Benítez, he is an Interpol police officer, Joel is involved in a covert operation to deactivate the international traffic networks of women and children for sexual exploitation.
- Gabriela Vergara as Paula Duarte, is the private secretary and lover of Ernesto. She is a cold and ambitious woman who is responsible for designating political and media strategies to support Ernesto's political career.
- Khotan Fernández as Max Sullivan, for many years he has led a double life, married to Eliza in Mexico and Jennifer in the United States. He is not a bad guy and loves both families with all his heart. Things get complicated when he decides to divorce Jennifer and bring Eliza and her two children to live in the United States.
- Daniela Bascopé as Jennifer Suárez, her parents are from Latin America, but she was born and raised in the United States. Jennifer discovers Max's deception before anyone else and when she learns of her son's illness, she presses Max to stay with them and break any ties with his other family.
- Ana María Estupiñán as Karina Sullivan, she is the daughter of Max and Eliza, sister of Rodrigo and twin of Tomás. From her childhood, Karina was very interested in learning and in her studies. Ten years later, she becomes a beautiful and bright young girl, totally adapted to the customs and way of life of the Americans.
  - Sofía Osorio as Child Karina Sullivan
- Mauricio Novoa as Tomas Sullivan
- Samuel Sadovnik as Child Tomas Sullivan
- Daniela Wong as Alondra Martínez
- Regina Orquín as Child Alondra Martínez
- Jonathan Freudman as Julián Martínez
- Emmanuel Pérez/Luis Antonio as Child Julián Martínez
- Eduardo Trucco as Patrick O'Hara

== Production ==
The series was confirmed during Telemundo's upfront for the 2017-2018 television season. The production concluded on February 8, 2018.

=== Casting ===
In October 2017, it was announced Marjorie de Sousa had signed with Telemundo to be one of the main protagonists in the series. This would be the first appearance of Marjorie de Sousa with Telemundo, after acting for Venevisión and having formed part of the company Televisa for several years. On October 16, 2017, Litzy was confirmed as part of the main cast after three years in Señora Acero. The next day Gabriel Porras was confirmed as the protagonist. According to the People en Español magazine, the telenovela will star 6 actors of whom three are already known and who would be debuting as protagonists: Uriel del Toro, Guillermo Iván and Adriana Barraza who have previously acted in productions for Telemundo.

=== Promotion ===
The first trailer of the series was shown on January 2, 2018.

== Ratings ==
Viewership and ratings per season of Al otro lado del muro
Season	Timeslot (ET)	Episodes	First aired		Last aired		Avg. viewers (millions)
Season	Timeslot (ET)	Episodes	Date	Viewers (millions)	Date	Viewers (millions)	Avg. viewers (millions)
1	Mon–Fri 9:00 pm	78	21 February 2018	1.42	11 June 2018	1.48	1.16

== Episodes ==
No.	Title	Original release date	US viewers (millions)
Part 1
1	"Dos vidas, un destino"	21 February 2018	1.42
2	"Sofía denuncia a su marido"	22 February 2018	1.14
3	"Un francotirador mata a Irene"	23 February 2018	1.27
4	"Eliza continúa su viaje a EEUU"	26 February 2018	1.32
5	"Sofía trata de escapar"	27 February 2018	1.16
6	"Sofía es blanco de un atentado"	28 February 2018	1.36
7	"Sofía tiene un amante"	1 March 2018	1.23
8	"Sofía y su hija cruzan el muro"	2 March 2018	1.26
9	"Eliza espera encontrar a Max"	5 March 2018	1.33
10	"Ernesto intenta matar a Joel"	6 March 2018	1.28
11	"Culpan a Sofía de asesinato"	7 March 2018	1.13
12	"Eliza está embarazada"	8 March 2018	1.16
13	"Joel cerca de dar con Sofía"	9 March 2018	1.05
14	"Joel arresta a Sofía"	12 March 2018	1.12
15	"El gobernador ataca a Sofía"	13 March 2018	1.10
16	"Sofía se declara culpable"	14 March 2018	1.12
Part 2
17	"Eliza encuentra a Max"	15 March 2018	1.12
18	"Sofía trabaja de incógnito"	16 March 2018	1.14
19	"Eliza está furiosa con Max"	19 March 2018	1.20
20	"Max y Rodrigo se reconocen"	20 March 2018	1.32
21	"Eliza confiesa todo sobre Max"	21 March 2018	1.36
22	"Joel propone tregua a Sofía"	22 March 2018	1.21
23	"Jennifer agrede a Eliza"	23 March 2018	1.03
24	"Alondra enfrenta a Ernesto"	26 March 2018	1.18
25	"Joel rescata a Alondra"	27 March 2018	1.23
26	"Eliza y Max se reconcilian"	28 March 2018	1.15
27	"Sofía y Joel otra vez juntos"	29 March 2018	1.05
28	"Joel tiene otra mujer"	30 March 2018	0.87
29	"Una sorpresa para Eliza"	2 April 2018	1.15
30	"Sofía cambia su identidad"	3 April 2018	1.07
31	"Ernesto ve a Alejandra"	4 April 2018	1.21
32	"Apuñalan a Max frente a Eliza"	5 April 2018	1.16
33	"Alondra odia a su padre"	6 April 2018	0.99
34	"Sofía desilusiona a Joel"	9 April 2018	1.26
35	"Alondra ve a Alejandra"	10 April 2018	1.13
36	"Karina teme ser deportada"	11 April 2018	1.12
37	"Max sorprende a Eliza"	12 April 2018	1.11
38	"Ernesto sospecha de Alejandra"	13 April 2018	1.01
39	"Sofía espía a Ernesto"	16 April 2018	1.19
40	"Eliza conoce a Alejandra"	17 April 2018	1.16
41	"Max da su apellido a Rodrigo"	18 April 2018	1.25
42	"Alondra va a vivir con Ernesto"	19 April 2018	1.25
43	"Sofía cae en las redes de Joel"	20 April 2018	1.04
44	"Alondra busca la verdad"	23 April 2018	1.14
45	"Max se compromete con Eliza"	24 April 2018	1.21
46	"Jennifer engaña a Eliza"	25 April 2018	1.25
47	"El sacrificio de Rodrigo"	27 April 2018	1.05
48	"La trampa de Sofía"	30 April 2018	1.11
49	"Ordenan matar a Alejandra"	1 May 2018	1.07
50	"Eliza abofetea a Jennifer"	2 May 2018	1.29
51	"Eliza rompe con Max"	3 May 2018	1.16
52	"Joel desconfía de Sofía"	4 May 2018	1.01
53	"Alejandra ilusiona a Ernesto"	7 May 2018	1.20
54	"Ernesto presiona a Alejandra"	8 May 2018	1.22
55	"Sofía y Joel arriesgan la vida"	9 May 2018	1.20
56	"Cae rey del tráfico de niños"	10 May 2018	1.09
57	"Alondra halla pistas de Sofía"	11 May 2018	1.08
58	"Jennifer evita que la atrapen"	14 May 2018	1.05
59	"Lorena confiesa su error"	15 May 2018	1.10
60	"Eliza amenaza de muerte a Max"	16 May 2018	1.12
61	"Eliza confirma sus sospechas"	17 May 2018	1.21
62	"Jennifer expone a Eliza"	18 May 2018	1.07
63	"El socio de Eliza propone boda"	21 May 2018	1.09
64	"La tragedia une a Sofía y Joel"	22 May 2018	1.11
65	"La tragedia une a Sofía y Joel"	23 May 2018	1.15
66	"Eliza se casará con Andrés"	24 May 2018	1.16
67	"Alondra echa a Sofía"	25 May 2018	0.98
68	"Peligra la vida de Alondra"	28 May 2018	1.05
69	"Max se divorcia de Eliza"	29 May 2018	1.21
70	"Sofía se casará con el enemigo"	30 May 2018	1.16
71	"Joel oye la verdad sobre Irene"	31 May 2018	1.12
72	"Lorena destruye las pruebas"	1 June 2018	0.94
73	"Joel le pide perdón a Sofía"	4 June 2018	1.12
74	"Sofía oculta su boda a Joel"	5 June 2018	1.13
75	"Sofía droga a Ernesto"	6 June 2018	1.08
76	"Atacan a Alejandra y a su hija"	7 June 2018	1.11
77	"El rescate de Alondra"	8 June 2018	1.13
78	"Eliza y Andrés se casan"	11 June 2018	1.48

== Awards and nominations ==
Year	Award	Category	Nominated	Result
2019	International Emmy Award	Best Non-English Language U.S. Primetime Program	Al otro lado del muro	Nominated
