= Albi De Abreu =

Venezuelan theater and television actor

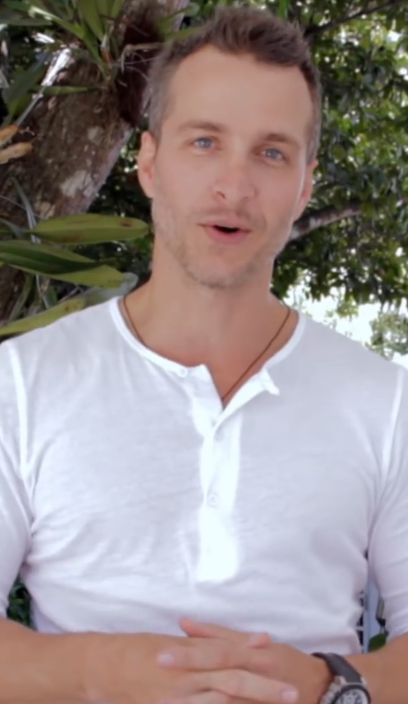
- Abreu in September 2013
- Born: Albino de Abreu Do Nascimiento; May 31, 1975 (age 51); Caracas, Venezuela
- Occupation: Actor

Albi De Abreu (born as Albino de Abreu Do Nascimiento on 31 May 1975) is a Venezuelan theater and television actor.

== Early life ==
Albi began his television career at the age of 14 when he began appearing in several TV commercials. He got his first acting role in the telenovela Sol de Tentación in 1996. Thereafter, he portrayed leading roles in many Venezuelan telenovelas and TV series. Shortly thereafter, Albi acted in several features films and plays.

== Career ==
Being aware of the importance of being fully trained and prepared, Albi De Abreu put on hold his acting career, and spent two years improving his acting skills at the Sanford Meisner in Los Angeles. Also he became a fluent English, Portuguese and Spanish speaker.

Besides his acting career, Albi De Abreu has been developing his skills as a director, movie writer, and documentary photographer. Colmillo (Fang) and Musica Del Cielo(Music from the Sky) are the two short films he had written and directed.

In 2012, he portrayed the villain in the Colombian TV series Lynch.

== Filmography ==
=== Film roles ===
Year	Title	Role	Notes
2005	The Boardwalk Spy, and Other Stories	Roberto	Short film
2007	Miranda regresa	Smith	
2007	Puras joyitas	Coqueto	
2008	Todo lo que sube	Lead	Short film
2008	A mí me gusta	Fabián	
2008	Dark World	Hitchhiker	
2010	Desautorizado	Andy	
2010	The Zero Hour	Jesús	
2010	Tuya	Jorge	Short film
2011	Cortos interruptus	Jorge	
2011	Greetings to the Devil	Luis	
2012	El manzano azul	Old Diego	
2013	Diario de Bucaramanga	O'Leary	
2014	Singular	Víctor	Short film
2017	Doble	Patient	
2018	La noche de las dos lunas	Ubaldo Garrido	
2022	Litlle Square		
2022	Birthday Boy		
2025	Forever Liam		

=== Televisión roles ===
Year	Title	Role	Notes
1996	Sol de tentación	Ezequiel	
1998	Reina de corazones	Federico	
2000	Angélica pecado	Alex	
2000	Mariú	Marco Tulio Cárdenas	
2001	La soberana	Álvaro Mesías	Main role; 118 episodes
2002–2003	La mujer de Judas	Alirio Agüero del Toro	
2007	Camaleona	Gustavo Casanova	
2008	Tiempo final	TBA	Episode called: Lesbianas
2009	Los misterios del amor	Gabriel Acosta	
2010–2011	La mujer perfecta	Lucho Montilla	
2012	Kdabra	Father Andrés	Recurring role (season 3); 10 episodes
2013	Lynch	Nelson	Recurring role (season 2); 2 episodes
2013	Los secretos de Lucía	La Llaga	
2013–2014	Cumbia Ninja	Ítalo	Recurring role (seasons 1–3); 42 episodes
2014	El corazón del océano	Capitán Bompere	2 episodes
2017	El Comandante	Cristóbal Iturbe	Series regular
2017	La querida del Centauro	El Loco	Recurring role (season 2); 22 episodes
2018	Luis Miguel: The Series	Miguel Ángel Villegas	Episode: "No me platiques más"
2018	Mi lista de exes	Sebastián	4 episodes
2019	La Bandida	Tommy	Series regular; 58 episodes
2019	Por amar sin ley	El Gringo	Recurring role (season 2); 62 episodes
2019	Wild District	Carpado	Guest appearance
2019	Los pecados de Bárbara	Bosco de Agostini	Series regular; 22 episodes
TBA	La negociadora	Fabio	
2022	El Repatriado	Carroña	3 episodes
2023	Codex 632	Dogo	Main Role
2024	Women in Blue	Jacob	Cast
2025	Quebranto	Rafael Lara	Main Role
