= Marjorie de Sousa =

Venezuelan actress and model (born 1980)

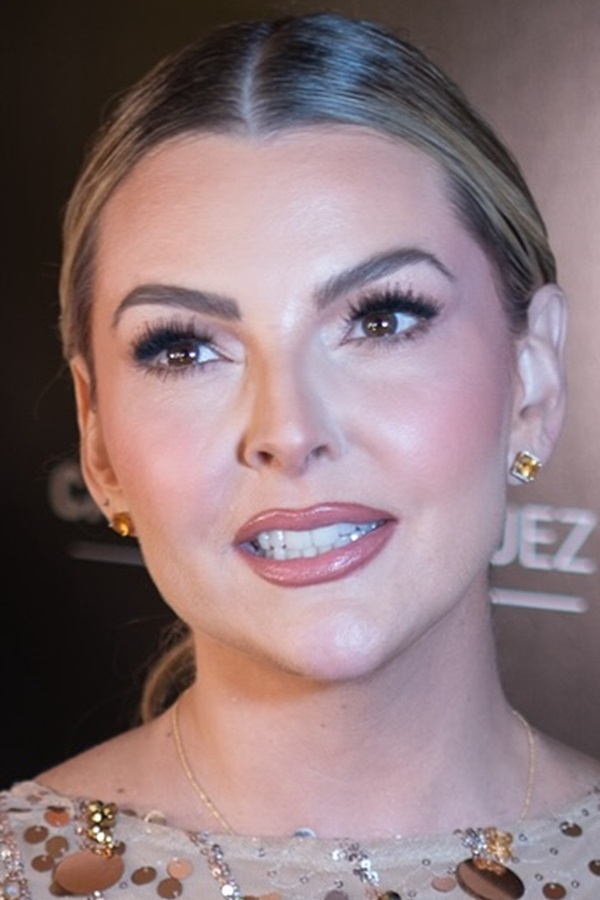
- de Sousa in 2025
- Born: Marjorie Lissette de Sousa Rivas; 23 April 1980 (age 46); Caracas, Venezuela
- Occupations: Actress; model; singer
- Years active: 1999–present
- Spouse: Ricardo Álamo (m. 2004; div. 2006)
- Partner: Julián Gil (2016–2017)
- Children: 1
- Modeling information
- Height: 173 cm (5 ft 8 in)
- Hair color: Blonde
- Eye color: Brown
- Agency: Palomera Group; Media Concepts PR
- Musical career
- Genres: Latin pop; urban
- Instrument: Vocals
- Label: MDS Music

Marjorie Lissette de Sousa Rivas (born 23 April 1980) is a Venezuelan actress, model, and singer. She was a contestant in the Miss Venezuela 1999 pageant, and made her screen debut in the telenovela Toda mujer (2000). Her accolades include the TVyNovelas Awards, in addition to nominations for the Juventud Awards and People en Español Awards.

== Career ==
=== 1999–2009: Beginnings and notable roles ===
At age 12, de Sousa began her career doing television commercials and working as a model. In 1999, she entered the beauty pageant Miss Venezuela in the hands of the famous Venezuelan designer Giovanni Scutaro. A year later, she worked on her first telenovela, Amantes de luna llena, which was produced and broadcast by the television channel Venevisión. In 2001, she co-starred in the hit telenovela Guerra de mujeres, with the character Carolina, one of the most popular in the plot.

In 2002, de Sousa left Venezuela to work on the telenovela Gata salvaje, a co-production of Venevisión and the Spanish-American channel Univision. In this internationally acclaimed novel, she plays Camelia Valente, an antagonist in which she has perhaps been one of her best characters, achieving her international projection. Next, she worked on another successful Univision telenovela called Rebeca, where she had the character of Gisela, another role where she acted as an antagonist. At the end of that production, de Sousa went to work on the Mexican telenovela Mariana de la noche, produced by Televisa; there her character had the name of Carol, also as an antagonist.

In 2005, she starred in the telenovela Ser bonita no basta of the TV network RCTV. A year later she returned to star in another telenovela of RCTV, Y los declaro marido y mujer, a beach production set in Venezuela's Margarita Island. In 2008, de Sousa began to work in the cast of the telenovela Amor comprado, produced by Venevisión; with a character as villain of the plot called Margot. She also participated in the films Soltera y sin compromiso (2006) and Duelos de pasarelas (2008).

=== 2010–present: Critical success in telenovelas ===
In 2010, de Sousa becomes the antagonist of the telenovela Pecadora next to Eduardo Capetillo and Litzy where she began to have skills as a singer interpreting the theme of her character and the protagonist. In 2011, she appeared in the telenovela Sacrificio de mujer, alongside Luis José Santander and its directed by Adriana Barraza. That same year she starred in the video for the song "Poquito a Poquito" by Henry Santos, former member of American bachata group Aventura.

In 2012, she played an antagonist in a special participation in Corazón apasionado alongside Guy Ecker and Marlene Favela. de Sousa made her theatrical debut at Toc Toc, a world-renowned work, and received the best critics of the industry after her unique and original interpretation of Lili. That year she also received the Miami Life Award in Best Female Protagonist category for her extraordinary performance as Clemencia in Sacrificio de mujer. In the same year, de Sousa returned to Televisa as an antagonist in the telenovela Amores verdaderos produced by Nicandro Díaz González. Due to the success of her character in the telenovela, she won the prize as Best Antagonist in a telenovela at the Premios TVyNovelas. In 2013, she joined the cast of the play Perfume de Gardenia, produced by Omar Suárez. She also appeared in the fourth season of reality show ¡Mira quién baila!, being in third place.

In 2014, de Sousa got her first lead on Televisa, in the telenovela Hasta el fin del mundo, first paired with Pedro Fernández, who left the project due to supposed problems with de Sousa, and David Zepeda took the place of Fernández. After Hasta el fin del mundo, she participated in 2016 in Juan Osorio's telenovela, Sueño de amor, in which only as a guest star appeared. In 2017, she signed an exclusive contract with the Spanish-language television network Telemundo. The network began filming the telenovela Al otro lado del muro, alongside Litzy that debut on 21 February 2018. In October 2020, de Sousa participated in the second season of the reality show ¿Quién es la máscara?, the Mexican version of Masked Singer, as a banana. She was eliminated in the second episode.

== Personal life ==
de Sousa married Venezuelan actor Ricardo Álamo in 2004 and divorced him in 2006. In 2016, she had a romantic relationship with Argentine-born Puerto Rican actor Julián Gil, with whom she had her first son Matías Gregorio Gil de Sousa. The relationship between de Sousa and Gil ended unamicably in 2017.

== Filmography ==
Film roles
| Year | Title | Role | Notes |
|---|---|---|---|
| 2006 | Soltera y sin compromiso | Julia Maldonado | Television film |
| 2008 | Duelos de pasarelas | Natalia Rios | |
| 2017 | Juan Apóstol, el más amado | María Magdalena | |
| 2018 | Lo más sencillo es complicarlo todo | Susana | |
| 2023 | Novios por Navidad | Valeria Santacruz | Television film; short |
| 2024 | Mi perfecto ex | Cata | Television film |

Television roles
| Year | Title | Role | Notes |
|---|---|---|---|
| 2000 | Toda mujer | América | |
| 2000–2001 | Amantes de luna llena | Mayra Robledo | |
| 2001–2002 | Guerra de mujeres | Carolina Bonilla | |
| 2002–2003 | Gata salvaje | Camelia Valente | |
| 2003 | Rebeca | Gisela Gidalva | |
| 2003–2004 | Mariana de la noche | Carol Montero | |
| 2005 | Ser bonita no basta | Coral Torres | |
| 2006–2007 | Y los declaro marido y mujer | Saoia Mujica | |
| 2007 | Isla Paraíso | Maite | Miniseries |
| 2008 | Amor comprado | Margot Salinas | |
| 2008–2009 | ¿Vieja yo? | Estefanía Urrutia | |
| 2010 | Pecadora | Samantha Sabater | |
| 2011 | Sacrificio de mujer | Clemencia Astudillo | |
| 2012 | Corazón apasionado | Leticia Bracamontes | |
| 2012–2013 | Amores verdaderos | Kendra Ferreti | |
| 2014–2015 | Hasta el fin del mundo | Sofía Ripoll | |
| 2016 | Sueño de amor | Cristina Vélez | |
| 2017 | Mi marido tiene familia | Herself | |
| 2018 | Al otro lado del muro | Sofía Villavicencio | |
| 2018 | Descontrol | Ariadna Morelos | |
| 2019 | Un poquito tuyo | Julieta Vargas | |
| 2021 | La desalmada | Julia Torreblanca | |
| 2022–2023 | Amores que engañan | Several roles | |
| 2023–2024 | Golpe de suerte | Eva Montana | |
| 2024 | El Conde: Amor y honor | Cayetana Carrá | |
| 2025 | Cómplices | Stacy Marcos | |
| 2026 | Lobo, morir matando | Graciela Villanueva | |
| 2026 | Infinito amor | Amanda Soriano | |

Theatre
| Year | Title | Role | Venue |
|---|---|---|---|
| 2009 | Orinoco | Unknown | Unknown |
| 2012 | Toc Toc | Lili | Several locations |
| 2013 | Perfume de gardenia | Gardenia Peralta | Several locations |
| 2015 | Hasta el fin del mundo... Cantaré | Sofía Ripoll | Several locations |
| 2016 | ¿Por qué los hombres aman a las cabronas? | Dulce | Several locations |
| 2018 | El matrimonio perjudica seriamente la salud | Julia | Several locations |
| 2026 | Perfume de gardenia | Gardenia Peralta | Teatro San Rafael |

Music videos
| Year | Title | Artist | Album |
|---|---|---|---|
| 2011 | "Poquito a Poquito" | Henry Santos | Introducing Henry Santos |

== Discography ==
Singles
| Year | Title | Peaks | Album |
|---|---|---|---|
| 2019 | "Un Poquito Tuya" | —N/a | Non-album singles |
| 2020 | "Morenito de Mi Amor" | —N/a | Non-album singles |
| 2021 | "Ni Diabla Ni Santa" | —N/a | Non-album singles |
| 2022 | "La Alegría de la Navidad" | —N/a | Non-album singles |

== Awards and nominations ==
| Year | Award | Result | Category | Work |
|---|---|---|---|---|
| 2007 | 2 de Oro Awards | Nominated | Actress of the Year | Y los declaro marido y mujer |
| 2012 | Miami Life Awards | Won | Female Protagonist | Sacrificio de mujer |
| 2013 | Juventud Awards | Nominated | Girl That Takes Away My Sleep | Amores verdaderos |
| 2013 | People en Español Awards | Nominated | Best Female Villain | Amores verdaderos |
| 2014 | Bravo Awards | Won | Most Outstanding Female Villain | Amores verdaderos |
| 2014 | People en Español Awards | Nominated | Best Actress | Hasta el fin del mundo |
| 2014 | People en Español Awards | Nominated | Better Chemistry on the Screen (with Pedro Fernández) | Hasta el fin del mundo |
| 2014 | TVyNovelas Awards (Mexico) | Won | Best Antagonist Actress | Amores verdaderos |
| 2014 | TVyNovelas Awards (Mexico) | Won | Favorite Villain | Amores verdaderos |
| 2014 | TVyNovelas Awards (Mexico) | Nominated | The Most Beautiful Woman | Amores verdaderos |
| 2015 | Juventud Awards | Nominated | My Favorite Protagonist | Hasta el fin del mundo |
| 2016 | Juventud Awards | Nominated | My Favorite Protagonist | Hasta el fin del mundo |
| 2019 | Soap Awards France | Nominated | Best International Actress | Al otro lado del muro |
