= Luisa Fernanda (disambiguation) =

Luisa Fernanda (born c. 1970) is a Mexican television presenter.

Luisa Fernanda may also refer to:

- Luisa Fernanda of Spain (1832–1897), Infanta of Spain, Duchess of Montpensier
- Luisa Fernanda Rudi Ubeda (born 1950), Spanish politician
- Luisa Fernanda (telenovela), Venezuelan telenovella (1998–1999)
- Luisa Fernanda (zarzuela), 1932 zarzuela by Federico Moreno Torroba
