= Veronica Schneider =

Model and actress

Verónica Schneider Rodríguez
- Born: Veronica Schneider; 16 December 1978 (age 47); Caracas, Venezuela
- Height: 1.77 m (5 ft 9 3/4 in)
- Beauty pageant titleholder
- Title: Miss World Venezuela 1998
- Hair color: Brown
- Major competitions: Miss Venezuela 1998 (Miss World Venezuela) (Miss Photogenic) (Best Smile); Miss World 1998

Verónica Schneider Rodríguez (born 16 December 1978, in Caracas, Venezuela) is a Venezuelan model, actress and beauty pageant titleholder.

== Biography ==
Schneider was born in Caracas, Venezuela to María Elisa (sociologist) and Pablo Schneider (musician). As Miss Monagas 1997, she competed in the Miss Venezuela 1998 pageant and was Miss World Venezuela 1998. In November of that year, she went to the Seychelles to compete in the Miss World 1998 pageant, where she did not make it to the semi-finals. She also studied Computer Science at Universidad Central de Venezuela.

In 2002, Schneider turned to television and signed with Venevision. The first role she got was in the telenovela Mambo y Canela where she played the part of Wanda. In 2003, she was cast in the role of Marisela Ruiz Montero in the telenovela Enganada. In 2004, she went to Peru to play villain Fernanda Velacochea in the telenovela Besos Robados. In 2005, she signed with RCTV and played the role of Erika Hoffman in Amantes an early 20th-century production. In 2011 Schneider appeared in the telenovela La Viuda Joven, produced by Venevision. In 2012 she starred in La ratonera by Agatha Christie.

== Personal life ==
She is married to the model Enrique Palacios and has two children Sarah and David.

== Filmography ==
=== Television ===
- 2025 Maria, Madre De Dios
- 2019 Betty en NY
- 2018 Mi Familia Perfecta
- 2011 La viuda joven
- 2006 Y los declaro marido y mujer
- 2005 Amantes
- 2004 Besos robados
- 2003 Engañada
- 2002 Mambo y canela

=== Videoclip ===
- Bailando Bachata, 2023 alongside Chayanne

Awards and achievements
Preceded by (Nueva Esparta) Christina Dieckmann	Miss World Venezuela; 1998	Succeeded by (Miranda (state)) Martina Thorogood
