= Amalia Andrade Arango =

Colombian writer (born 1986)

- Born: 20 January 1986 (age 40); Cali, Colombia
- Occupation: Author
- Writing career
- Language: Spanish

Amalia Andrade Arango (born 20 January 1986) is a Colombian writer, journalist and illustrator. She is mainly recognized for her bestselling book Uno siempre cambia el amor de su vida, published by Editorial Planeta in 2015.

== Early life and education ==
Andrade was born in Cali, capital of the department of Valle del Cauca, on 20 January 1986. She attended elementary and high school at the Colegio Jefferson. After graduating she moved to the city of Bogotá to attend the Pontificia Universidad Javeriana, where she studied Literary Studies.

== Career ==
After graduation, Andrade was professionally linked to written and virtual media in Colombia such as Vive.in, Fucsia, SoHo and Shock, as well as Girls Like Us in the United States. Her first work, Uno siempre cambia al amor de su vida (por otro amor o por otra vida), was published by Editorial Planeta in 2015, achieving notable success in her country and abroad, reaching three editions. The book, illustrated by the author, was translated into English under the title You Always Change the Love of Your Life (for Another Love or Another Life). In 2017, she published her second book, Cosas que piensas cuando te muerdes las uñas, based on her own personal experiences. A year later, she published her third work, Tarot magicomístico de estrellas, through Editorial Espasa. In 2023, she published her fourth work, No sé cómo mostrar dónde me duele, again published Editorial Planeta.

== Personal life ==
Andrade is openly lesbian. In 2018, she publicly confirmed she was in a relationship with Venezuelan actress Marianela González. They ended their relationship in 2021.

== Bibliography ==
- Uno siempre cambia al amor de su vida (2015)
- Cosas que piensas cuando te muerdes las uñas (2017)
- Tarot magicomístico de estrellas (2018)
- No sé cómo mostrar dónde me duele (2023)
