= Josette Vidal =

Venezuelan actress

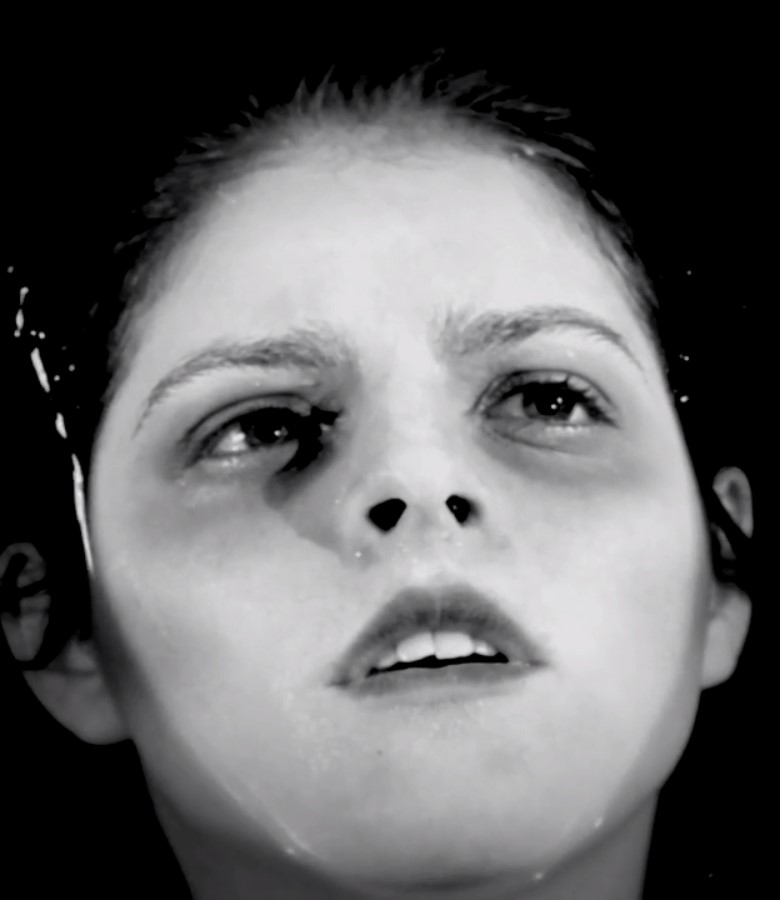
- Born: Josette Vidal Restifo; March 25, 1993 (age 32); Caracas, Venezuela
- Occupation: Actress
- Years active: 2011–present
- Mother: Julie Restifo

Josette Vidal (born 25 March 1993) is a Venezuelan television actress. She is most recognized for her portrayal of Melibea Fuentes Cordero, on the Televen drama telenovela Nacer contigo.

== Filmography ==
Year	Project	Role	Notes	Ref.
2011	La viuda joven	Julie Castillo Humboldt	TV series	
2012	Nacer contigo	Melibea Fuentes Cordero	TV series	
2014	No te voy a dejar sola	Lorena	Feature film	
2014	3 Bellezas	Estefanía	Feature film	
2014	La Roca	The Head	Feature film	
2015	Toni, la Chef	Sara Fuccinelli	TV series	
2017	La Fan	Miriam del Carmen	TV series	
2017–2018	Corazón traicionado	Virginia Ramírez	TV series	
2017–2018	Sangre de mi tierra	Paloma	TV series	
2020	Súbete a mi Moto	Julieta Torres	TV series	

== Awards and nominations ==
Year	Award	Category	Works	Result
2015	Kids Choice Awards México	Favorite Villain	Toni, la Chef	Won
2015	Kids Choice Awards Colombia	Favorite Villain	Toni, la Chef	Won
