= Marianela González =

Venezuelan actress and model (born 1978)

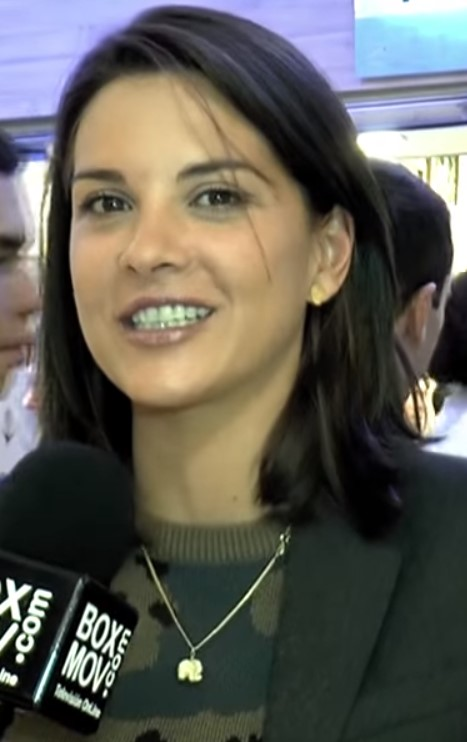
- Born: Marianela Aime González Alvarez; Caracas, Venezuela
- Other names: Nela González
- Occupations: actriz, model
- Years active: 2000 - present
- Known for: Pandora, Renata

Marianela González is a Venezuelan actress and model based in Colombia. She is best known for her role as Pandora Villenueva in Mi Gorda Bella and Renata Medina in La Traicionera.

== Personal life ==
González is bisexual. From 2018 to 2021, she was in a relationship with writer Amalia Andrade Arango.

== Filmography ==
Television performance
Year	Title	Roles	Notes
1999-2000	La Calle de los Sueños	Mariana	Main Role; 90 episodes
2001	Carissima	Marni Zurli	Recurring role
2001	La niña de mis ojos	Mariana Aguirre	Recurring role
2003	My Sweet Fat Valentina	Pandora Villanueva Mercouri	Main role; 178 episodes
2004	Estrambótica Anastasia	María Gracia	Recurring role; 39 episodes
2005	Ser bonita no basta	Esmeralda Falcón	Main role; 114 episodes
2006	Por todo lo alto	Anabela Marcano	Main role; 120 episodes
2007	Camaleona	Mercedes Luzardo	Main role; 116 episodes
2008-2009	Nadie me dirá como quererte	María Eugenia Alonso	Main role; 160 episodes
2010	Que el cielo me explique	Tania Sánchez	Main role; 66 episodes
2011	Los caballeros las prefieren brutas	Nina Guerrero	Guest role (season 2); 8 episodes
2011–2012	La Traicionera	Renata Medina Herrera	Main role; 267 episodes
2014	Dulce amor	Natalia Toledo	Main role; 124 episodes
2016	La ley del corazón	Irene Robles	Guest role; 2 episodes
2016	Hilos de sangre azul	Cristina Urrutia	Recurring role
2017	El Comandante	Daniela Vásquez	Main role; 102 episodes
2018	Garzón vive	radio presenter	Guest role; 3 episodes
2019	El final del paraíso	Emilia Vallejo	Recurring role (season 4); 18 episodes
2019	Distrito salvaje	Manuela	Guest role (season 2)
2020	Testosterona Pink	Lorena	Guest role (season 2); 3 episodes
