= Juan Carlos Alarcón =

Venezuelan actor

- Born: Juan Carlos Alarcón García; October 27, 1971 (age 54); Mérida, Venezuela
- Occupation: Actor
- Spouse: 1990-2011, 2021

Juan Carlos Alarcón García (born October 27, 1971) is a Venezuelan actor. He was born in Mérida, Venezuela. He is internationally known for his role as the maternal uncle of Juana Pérez in Radio Caracas Televisión's soap Juana la Virgen.

== Filmography ==
=== Telenovelas ===
- Que el cielo me explique RCTV as Carlos Patiño
- Nadie me Dira Como Quererte RCTV (2008) as Cesar Leal
- Camaleona RCTV (2007)
- Amantes RCTV (2005) as Camilo
- La Cuaima RCTV (2003)
- Juana la virgen RCTV (2002)
- Viva la Pepa RCTV (2001)
- Hay Amores que Matan RCTV (2000)
- Aunque me Cueste la Vida RCTV (1998)
- María de los Ángeles RCTV (1997)
- La Inolvidable RCTV (1996)
- Ilusiones RCTV (1995)

=== Movies ===
- Desautorizado ( 2010) as Federico
- Asesinato en lunes de carnaval (2002)
- Oro Diablo (2000)
- Manuela Sáenz (2000)
- Fosa Común (1998)

=== TV Series ===
- Cinco de chocolate y una de fresa / Five of chocolate and one of strawberry - VTV (1989)

=== Theater play ===
- Actos indecentes (2010)
- Los Navegaos (2006)
