= Tu volverás (TV series) =

- Created by: Original story: Carolina Espada; Characters; Edmond Dantes
- Developed by: Telemundo Studios, Miami
- Written by: Carolina Espada
- Directed by: Joshua Mintz
- Starring: Laura Chimaras; Gaby Espino; Carlos Ferro; Gabriel Coronel
- Opening theme: Gabriel Coronel
- Country of origin: United States
- Original language: Spanish
- No. of episodes: 111

Production
- Executive producer: Nicolás di Blassi
- Producer: Gemma Lombardi Ortín
- Production location: Miami
- Editor: Hader Antivar Duque
- Camera setup: Multi-camera
- Running time: 42-48 minutes (eps 1-111)

Original release
- Network: Telemundo
- Release: September 13, 2015

Related
- Dueños del paraíso

Tu volverás is a soap opera produced by Telemundo Studios Miami and released in Singapore. The series starred Laura Chimaras, Gaby Espino, Carlos Ferro, and Gabriel Coronel.

== Synopsis ==
Natalia, Diego, Sofia, and three brothers find themselves in a difficult situation as they are hated by their own family and are forced to flee their home after their parents are murdered. They are left with no choice but to start anew in the countryside, adopting new identities to rebuild their lives.

Twelve years pass, and the sisters, Natalia and Sofia, are desperate for money. They decide to reveal the truth about their past in order to secure some financial support. In a twist of fate, they become acquainted with the children of a wealthy billionaire who owns the largest cosmetic company in the United States. As their lives become entangled, they must face the person responsible for their parents' death and seek justice.

Throughout their journey, the story explores several major themes. Romance blooms amidst the hardships and challenges they face. The characters grapple with the mistakes they have made in life and strive to overcome them. They learn the importance of forgiveness and letting go of hatred, as they are surrounded by those who genuinely care for them. Duty and loyalty to those who love them become significant driving forces in their lives.

The characters navigate interpersonal conflicts, concealed information, and legal or moral inquiries, resulting in character development. Their objectives include achieving personal goals, resolving past events, and establishing future stability.

== Cast ==
- Laura Chimaras - Daniela Cruz / Natalia Cruz
- Gaby Espino - Gabriela Cruz Kings / Kings Cross Sofia
- Carlos Ferro - Juan Andres Sanchez
- Gabriel Coronel - Santiago Sánchez
- Daniela Navarro - Violet Fuenmayor
- Marlene Favela - Clara Sanchez
- Jorge Luis Pila - Julian Reyes
- Jonathan Freudman - Alejandro Galvez
- Dad Dager - Fernanda Alonso
- Mercedes Molto - Mercy Cross
- Jeannette Lehr - Teresa Baura
- José Guillermo Cortines - Cesar Andrade
- Desideria D'Caro - Isabel Reyes
- Alex Hernandez - Leonardo Portillo
- Saul Lisazo - Horacio Sanchez
- Maritza Bustamante - Marianela Silva
- Beatriz Valdés - Patricia Rogers Galvez / Poppy Valdivia
- Kevin Aponte - Maximiliano Alonso / Alonso Edward Rogers
- Ana Carolina Grajales - Veronica "Vero" Silva
- Roberto Mateos - Fernando Vidal
- Ana Layevska - Barbara Torres
- Leonardo Daniel - Ricardo Guzman
- Cynthia Olavarria - Miranda Sandoval
- Martha Picanes - Rosalinda Sanchez Vilanova
- Gabriel Correa - Anthony "Tony" Sanchez
- Anastasia Mazzone - Elizabeth Alarcon
- David Chocarro - Ignacio Galvez
- Wanda D'Isidoro - Lorena Sanchez
- Jonathan Islas - Alberto Nova
- Bernie Paz - Ernesto Sanchez
- Omar Granado - Vicente Chavez
- Maritza Rodríguez - Francisca Avila
- Oscar Gonzalez - Ludovico Fernandez
- Simon Roman - Gregorio Saez
- Alejandra Vaisman - Alicia Santos
- Carolina Tejera - Vanessa Rogers
- Ana Lorena Sanchez - Kimberly Soler
- Roberto Manrique - Alexander Aragón
- Rosario Delgado - Guadalupe Ferrreti
- Dalila Colombo - Dóris Cervantes de Aragón
- Alfredo Guerra - Noel Cruz
- Annabela Blum - Liliana Distem
- Juliana Divaste - Britney
- Luis José Almenta - Roman
- Jonathan Quintana - Bryan Aragon
- Fabiola Colmenares - Thalia
