= Divina obsesión =

- Genre: Telenovela
- Created by: José Ignacio Cabrujas; Perla Farias
- Story by: Perla Farias
- Directed by: Tito Rojas; Yuri Delgado
- Starring: Astrid Carolina Herrera; Pedro Lander; Marlene Maseda
- Opening theme: "Divina obsesión" instrumental composed by DRA
- Ending theme: "Divina obsesión" by Pedro Lander
- Country of origin: Venezuela
- Original language: Spanish
- No. of seasons: 1
- No. of episodes: 144

Production
- Producer: Juan Antonio Lamata
- Running time: 45 minutes
- Production company: Marte TV

Original release
- Network: Venevision
- Release: September 23, 1992 – March 16, 1993

Divina obsesión (English title:Divine obsession) is a Venezuelan telenovela created by José Ignacio Cabrujas and Perla Farias for the now-defunct production company Marte Televisión in 1992, for broadcast in Venevisión between October 6, 1992 and March 16, 1993.

The story was written by Perla Farías and José Ignacio Cabrujas. The protagonists were Astrid Carolina Herrera, Pedro Lander and Marlene Maseda.

== Plot ==
The story tells of two sisters separated as young children, one blonde with blue eyes and the other very fair-skinned with black hair. An argument between their parents sparks a fire. The reason for the argument: one of the girls was the product of their mother's infidelity with her husband's best friend. In the midst of the fire, the grandmother, the mother of the girls' supposed father, rescues the blonde girl, leaving the younger one, the product of the infidelity, to her fate. The girl manages to escape and, safe from the flames, is found by nuns who raise her. Years later, this girl grows up under the name Daniela, with no memory of her past. She is a beautiful novice who, by a twist of fate, falls in love with a man who makes her question her vocation. This same man is also loved by her sister Valentina, who suffers from a serious heart condition. Valentina, who grew up surrounded by luxury and with luck on her side, marries this man. When she cannot bear him a child, they seek a surrogate mother. which will be the same Daniela who is actually Raquel her beloved sister, many disagreements and the evil of her grandmother will prevent this secret from coming to light.

== Cast ==
- Astrid Carolina Herrera as Victoria Angarita / Raquel "Raquerra" / Daniela Espósito
- Pedro Lander as Andrés Eloy Lozada
- Marlene Maseda as Valentina
- Elba Escobar as Luisana
- Yajaira Orta
- Rafael Briceño
- Lourdes Valera
- Raquel Castaños
- Olimpia Maldonado as Angelina
- Luis Fernández
- José Zambrano
- Rodolfo Drago
- Carmen Julia Álvarez
- Xiomara Blanco
- Verónica Ortiz
- José Ángel Ávila
- Carmen Landaeta
- Graciela Alteiro
- Carolina Espada
- Yoletti Cabrera
- Jhonni Nessi
- María E. Pereira
- Felix Melo
- Daniela Alvarado
- Gabriela Spanic as Aurora
- Javier Valcárcel

== Notes ==
- In the making of the telenovela, the main cast Astrid Carolina Herrera, she was replaced for a few episodes by Carolina Groppuso because she was ill, and the telenovela was filmed only a few days before it aired.
- After the telenovela ended, it was followed by the Mexican production Yo no creo en los hombres for the 2:00 p.m. time slot, until March 24, 1993 when the telenovela Rosangélica began after María Mercedes ended at 1:00 p.m.
