= Yelena Maciel =

Venezuelan actress (born 1988)

- Born: 29 October 1988 (age 37); Merida, Venezuela
- Occupation: Actress
- Years active: 2002–present
- Spouse: Jonathan Montenegro (m. 2011; div. 2014)
- Children: 1

Yelena Carolina Maciel Vera (born 29 October 1988 in Merida, Venezuela) is a Venezuelan actress. She became known in 2002 on the Radio Caracas Televisión's telenovela, Trapos íntimos. In 2015 she obtained his first leading role in the RCTV Producciones telenovela, Corazón traicionado, a production that premiered 3 years later in Venezuela for Televen.

Maciel, with fellow Venezuelan Carlos Felipe Álvarez, starred within the music video for Daddy Yankee's "La Rompe Corazones", directed by Venezuelan director Nuno Gómes. The clip was scheduled to premier on Daddy Yankee's YouTube account on June 2, 2017 but had to be re-edited on June 1, 2017 due to the platform's change on its content regulations. The visual finally premiered on 7 June 2017.

== Filmography ==
Television roles
Year	Title	Roles	Notes
2002–2003	Trapos íntimos	María de Lourdes Lobo	
2004	¡Qué buena se puso Lola!	Anita	
2005–2006	Amantes	Teresa Rivera	
2006–2007	Y los declaro marido y mujer	Eulalia "Lali" Spert Mujica	
2008–2009	Nadie me dirá como quererte	Isabelita Perez	
2011	La viuda joven	La Pelusa / Ruth Luna	
2014	Escándalos	Sarahil Fadoul Yadhir	Episode: "Un gato para Sarahil"
2017–2018	Corazón traicionado	Lorena García	Main role

== Personal life ==
Maciel never married the Venezuelan actor Jonathan Montenegro in 2011 with the couple having their only child daughter in 2012. They divorced in 2014.
