= Chantal Baudaux =

Venezuelan actress and model

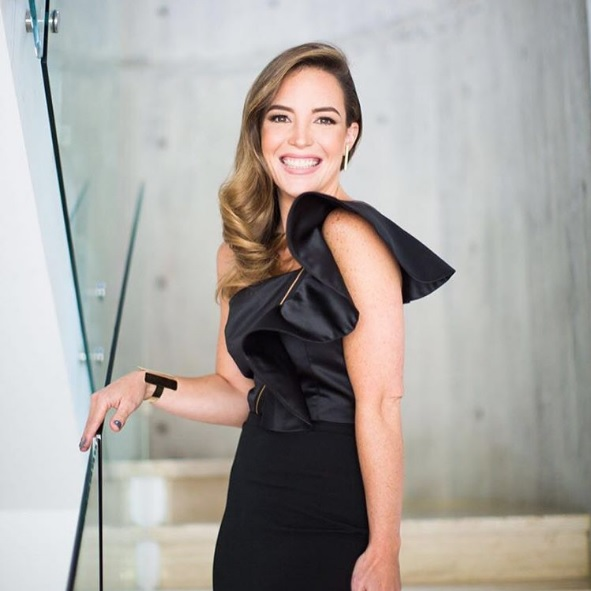
- Born: Chantal Nathaly Baudaux Jiménez; 4 January 1980 (age 46); Caracas, Venezuela
- Occupations: Actress; model
- Years active: 1998–2009
- Spouse: Alberto Morla(2008–present)

Chantal Nathaly Baudaux Jiménez (born 4 January 1980) is a Venezuelan actress and model of French and Spanish descent. She debuted in 1998 in telenovela Hoy te Vi, and came to international prominence as the protagonist of telenovela La Mujer de Judas.

== Personal and media life ==
Chantal Baudaux was born as Chantal Nathaly Baudaux Jiménez to Spanish mother and French father. In 2008, she married Alberto Morla , Venezuela businessman. Baudaux was raised with no religion.

== Filmography ==
Year	Title	Role	Notes
1998	Hoy te Vi	Jessica Linares Urdaneta	(TV Series)
2000	Mis 3 Hermanas	Beatriz Estrada Rossi	(TV Series)
2001	Carissima	Adriana Libordo	(TV Series)
2002	La mujer de Judas	Gloria Leal	(TV Series) (2002–03)
2003	La Cuaima	Alfonsina Rossi	(TV Series)
2004	Negra Consentida	Viviana Altúnez Meaño	(TV Series)
2004	Natalia de 8 a 9	Natalia	
2005	Amantes (telenovela)	Isabel Sarmiento	(TV Series)
2007	Dr. G y las Mujeres	Susyquiú	(TV Series)
2007	Señor Presidente	Camila Canales	
2008	Pensión Amalia	Cristina	
2009	Calle luna, Calle sol	Gabriela Bustamante	(TV Series)
