= Libres como el viento =

- Genre: Telenovela
- Created by: Pilar Romero; Iris Dubs
- Written by: Iraida Tapias; José Tomás Angola; José Manuel Espiño; Yoyiana Ahumada; Pilar Romero
- Directed by: Vicente Albarracín
- Starring: Laura Chimaras; Jonathan Montenegro; Juliet Lima; Damián Genovese
- Opening theme: "Celebra la vida" by Axel
- Ending theme: "Será libre" by Reinaldo Álvarez
- Country of origin: Venezuela
- Original language: Spanish
- No. of episodes: 118

Production
- Executive producer: Mileyba Álvarez Barreto
- Producer: Jhonny Pulido Mora
- Production location: Caracas
- Production company: RCTV

Original release
- Network: RCTV
- Release: August 24, 2009 – February 2, 2010

Related
- Calle luna, Calle sol

Libres como el viento (English title: Free as the wind) is a Venezuelan telenovela developed by Pilar Romero and produced by Radio Caracas Television in 2009. The series was inspired by the novel Una Brizna de paja en el viento written by Rómulo Gallegos in 1952. The story was based on the context of student protests that took place in the country during that year.

Laura Chimaras and Jonathan Montenegro starred as the protagonists with Guillermo Pérez, Juliet Lima and Damián Genovese as the antagonists.

== Plot ==
Libres como el viento is a love story marked by university news and pragmatic news of students.

Fabiola Azcárate, the youngest of five siblings, is sent abroad to continue her studies after her father's death. But nostalgia will force her to return to her country without knowing that the love of her childhood is waiting for her. Upon arrival, "La Muñeca", as her relatives call her, will find out that the brothers are divided because they do not know what to do with the inheritance that their father left them: abandon the family business or defend it until the end. The dilemma will mark the beginning of family discord.

For his part, Miguel Angel Marino "El Potro", son of the Hacienda Azcárate foreman, has become an adult man who has not forgotten Fabiola. But Tibisay Pacheco "La China", a sensual woman, is ready to do everything to conquer the love of Michelangelo.

The relationship of "La Muñeca" and "El Potro" will be a relationship marked by the impetus of youth and the craving for freedom, which will be strengthened at the Nicolas Copernicus University, whose classrooms are divided by two sides faced by the control of the college. One of the sides is directed by Diego Bravo, who seeks division and confrontation, and the other, whose leader is Reinaldo Torres, tries to consolidate the union of students in the university community.

The students are joined by Professor Rogelio Luciente, who becomes an influential figure in the student movement, and Professor Ivana Galván, who assists him in the movement's activities..

== Cast ==
- Laura Chimaras as Fabiola Azcárate Martínez "La Muñeca"
- Jonathan Montenegro as Miguel Ángel Marino "El Potro"
- Juliet Lima as Tibisay Pacheco "La China"
- Roberto Messuti as Rogelio Luciente
- Flavia Gleske as Raquel Luciente de Azcárate
- Marialejandra Martín as Rafaela Marcano
- Damián Genovese as Diego Bravo
- Guillermo Pérez as Dionisio Azcárate Martínez
- Carlos Felipe Álvarez as Reinaldo Torres
- Hernán Marcano as Marcos Chaparro Salazar
- Alejandro Otero asEzequiel Azcárate Martínez
- Raquel Yánez as Amarelis Sarmiento
- Dad Dáger as Ivana Galván
- Néstor Bravo as Maurico Leal
- Luis Fernando Sosa as Pablo Alfonso Azcátare Rivera
- Myriam Abreu as Andreína Andueza
- Ángel Casallas as Manuel Darío Gutiérrez
- Ana Castell as Natividad Salcedo
- Michelle Taurel as Ana "Anita" Marino
- Félix Loreto as Juan Marino
- Gabriela Santeliz as Nancy
- Gabriela Hernández as Yocelin Mijares
- Francis Rueda as Doña Natalicia Clemente
- Carlos Márquez as José Rosario Pacheco
- Mauricio Jiménez as Gustavo Coromoto "Coro Coro" (El "corre, ve y dile")
- Gonzalo Velutini as Aureliano Lucena (El Gobernador)
- Andreína Chataing as Luz
- Antonio Cuevas as Diego de Jesús Bravo
- Leonte Ortega as Balbino
- Catherine Cardozo as Carmelina
- Gabriel López as Andrés
