= Ser bonita no basta =

- Genre: Telenovela; Drama
- Created by: Perla Farías
- Written by: César Sierra; Carolina Mata; Juan Clemente Sánchez; José Tomás Angola; Yutzil Martínez
- Directed by: Luis Manzo; Nicolás Di Blasi; Yuri Delgado
- Starring: Marjorie de Sousa; Ricardo Álamo; Javier Vidal; Flávia Gleske; Marianela González; Fedra López
- Opening theme: "El beso de la vida" by Manuel Carrasco
- Country of origin: Venezuela
- Original language: Spanish
- No. of episodes: 114

Production
- Executive producer: Leonor Sardi Aguilera
- Production location: Caracas
- Running time: 45 minutes
- Production company: RCTV

Original release
- Network: RCTV
- Release: February 16 – July 27, 2005

Related
- Amantes

Ser bonita no basta (English title:Beauty is not enough) is a Venezuelan telenovela written by Perla Farías and produced by RCTV in 2005.

Marjorie de Sousa and Ricardo Álamo star as the main protagonists while Fedra López and Hugo Vásquez star as the main antagonists.

== Plot ==
Coral Torres, Topacio Martínez and Esmeralda Falcón are three half-sisters who are completely unaware of each other's existence and of the fact that their father, Asdrúbal Torres, is still alive. The only thing that links them is a birthmark in the shape of a crescent. Asdrúbal, an irresponsible man, left his family years ago, and has now returned to the country to look for his family and ask for their forgiveness.

Coral, the only legitimate daughter of Asdrúbal, is a young woman of captivating beauty and an aspiring model. But her life has been constrained by her domineering mother Soledad who wants to fulfill her dream of dominating the fashion world through her daughter. Soledad will do anything to see her wishes come true, and she even conspires to break up Coral and the love of her life, Alejandro Mendoza, who remains unaware that Coral is expecting his child.

Topacio grew up in an orphanage and has been eternally marked by the death of her brother Tomás. She rises to fame by becoming a beauty pageant winner and dreams of starting a family with Orlando, an ambitious man who uses Topacio's fame and beauty for his own gain. But when he betrays her, Topacio will discover the high price one has to pay for beauty.

Esmeralda, the youngest of the sisters, is shy and awkward girl who is a victim of her evil step-sisters. Despite her step-sister's envy, she leaves her childhood home once she discovers her father is alive, and sets off to search for him and fulfill her dream of being a fashion designer. All three sisters are incredibly beautiful in their own way, but nevertheless miserable in their private life.

== Cast ==
- Marjorie de Sousa as Coral Torres Olavarría
- Ricardo Álamo as Alejandro Mendoza
- Fedra López as Soledad Olavarría
- Javier Vidal as Asdrúbal Torres
- Flávia Gleske as Topacio Martínez
- Ricardo Bianchi as Julián Mendoza 'El Duque'
- Marianela González as Esmeralda Falcón
- Sebastián Falco as Benjamín Eskenazi
- Alejandro Otero as Francisco Arias
- Marlene Maseda as Carmela Guerra
- Hugo Vásquez as Orlando Álvarez
- Adolfo Cubas as Justo Olavarría
- Juan Carlos Baena as Eduardo Márquez
- Ernesto Balzi as Ezequiel Villavicencio
- Beatriz Vásquez as Teresa de Mendoza
- Leopoldo Regnault as Reynaldo Mantilla
- Alejandro Mata as Don Ramiro Campos
- Nathalie Cortez as Etelvina Martínez
- Gioia Lombardini as Doña Consuelo Rojas
- Sandy Olivares as Darío Peña
- Maria Antonieta Castillo as Elena 'Lala' Tirado
- Ana Gabriela Barboza as Jazmín Falcón
- Lolymar Sanchez as Rosa 'Rosita' Falcón
- Carmen Alicia Lara as Eilín Campos
- Anabella Troconis-Neri as Isabelina Villavicencio
- María Gabriela de Faría as Andreína Márquez
- Verónica Cortez as Margot de Falcón
- César Román as Ramón Seijas 'Ramsés'
- Crisol Carabal as Michelle
- Dora Mazzone as Betty Marrero
- Ligia Petit as Gala
- Édgar Ramírez as Leonardo
