= La mujer de Judas =

2002 Venezuelan telenovela

- Genre: Telenovela; Horror; Romance; Drama
- Created by: Martín Hahn
- Written by: Martín Hahn; Zaret Romero; Ana Teresa Sosa; Francisco Boza; Verónica Álvarez
- Directed by: Olegario Barrera; Otto Rodríguez
- Starring: Chantal Baudaux; Juan Carlos García; Astrid Carolina Herrera
- Opening theme: "Me Huele a Soledad" by MDO
- Ending theme: "Volver a Respirar" by Jessica
- Country of origin: Venezuela
- Original language: Spanish (with English subtitles)
- No. of episodes: 126

Production
- Executive producer: Mariana Djuro
- Producer: Marco Godoy Ramirez
- Production locations: Carora, Venezuela

Original release
- Network: RCTV
- Release: May 16 – December 6, 2002

Related
- La niña de mis ojos; Trapos íntimos

La mujer de Judas (English:The Wife of Judas) is a Venezuelan telenovela created by Martín Hahn for RCTV in 2002, the telenovela lasted for 126 episodes and was distributed internationally by RCTV International.

Astrid Carolina Herrera starred as the main antagonist with Chantal Baudaux and Juan Carlos García as the main protagonists.

== Plot ==
A dark secret which was securely kept hidden after all these years, connects six friends, heiress Altagracia del Toro, her best friend, Juaca; her other friends Ricarda; Marina; Chichita and Laura. One fateful day, Altagracia will marry a man named Julian Morera for money and to spite her father. On the same day, a man tries to rape her friend, Laura in the basement of the wine distilleries owned by Altagracia's family. Her friends accidentally kill him in the impulse of anger. The girls realize too late what they had done. They are shocked to see their parish priest, Padre Sebastian witness their crime. He asks them to report what happened to the police, but they reject the idea. Padre Sebastian departs. Then the friends agreed to hide the corpse inside a wall, each of them leaving the basement in search for the priest, fearing, that he will tell the police. But when Altagracia found him, he was already dead inside the confession box of the church and with that she was incarcerated for that crime.

20 years later, Altagracia, now given the infamous nickname "La Mujer de Judas", was released from prison much to public outrage from the townspeople of Carora. An aspiring reporter Gloria Leal along with her friends from the university is trying to find a subject for their documentary which is their final requirement before graduation. Gloria was attracted to uncover the mystery of "La Mujer de Judas" and wants to uncover if Altagracia was innocent all along. The idea was met by anger by Gloria's mother, Juaca, but Gloria cannot be stopped. She befriended the Officer in Charge of Del Toro winery, Salomon. As days pass, they became more attracted to each other. As Gloria and her friends try to uncover the secrets of the past, a mysterious figure dressed in a wedding dress hiding behind a skull mask starts to terrorize the town. The figure earns the name "La Mujer de Judas". Altagracia was immediately blamed by the townspeople but the police realize that there is no evidence linking Altagracia to this mysterious figure. La Mujer de Judas tries to destroy evidence and kills people that knows the truth to the events 20 years ago. But who is hiding behind the mask of La Mujer de Judas and what is the killer's motive? Will love be enough for them to survive?

At the end it is later unmasked that Altagracia herself is the real "La Mujer De Judas" And that she is the one vowing revenge on the people who abandoned her to suffer for a long time in prison.

== Cast ==
=== Main ===
- Chantal Baudaux as Gloria Leal / Gloria Rojas Del Toro
- Juan Carlos García as Salomón Vaisman
- Astrid Carolina Herrera as Altagracia Del Toro/La Mujer De Judas
- Luis Gerardo Nuñez as Marcos Rojas Paul
- Gledys Ibarra as Marina Batista
- Julie Restifo as Joaquina Leal/La Juaca
- Javier Vidal as Ludovico Agüero del Toro
- Dora Mazzone as Elda Chichita Agüero Del Toro
- Fedra López as Ricarda Araujo
- Kiara as Laura Briceño
- Albi De Abreu as Alirio Agüero del Toro

=== Recurring ===
- Roberto Moll as Buenaventura Briceño
- Karl Hoffman as Ernesto Sinclair
- Ámbar Díaz as Petunia López-Redill
- Mirela Mendoza as Emma Brand Echenagucia
- Nacho Huett as Ismael Agüero Del Toro
- Estefanía López as Cordelia Araujo Ramírez
- Concetta Lo Dolce as Sagrario Del Toro Sinclair
- Sandy Olivares as Renato Fabiani "René"
- Alejandro Otero as Francisco Cañero "Pancho"
- Kareliz Ollarves as Micaela Bellorín
- Juan Carlos Tarazona as Padre Sebastián Rojas Paúl
- Freddy Aquino as Gabriel Perdomo
- Betty Ruth as Berenice Vda. Del Toro
- Elisa Stella as Isabel
- Virginia Vera as Santia Del Carmen
- Alberto Álvarez as Juan Vicente Del Toro
- Juan Carlos Gardié as Julián Morera
- Marcos Campos as Leoncio Araujo
- Deyalit López as Lila Álvarez
- Rhandy Piñango as Calixto
- Rodolfo Renwick as Simón Rojas Paúl
- Ileana Alomá as Ivonne Del Toro
- Marielena Pereira as Dulce
- Liliana Meléndez as Rebeca
- Omaira Abinadé as Tita
- Kristin Pardo as Carmen Rosaura Guerrero Maldonado
- Susej Vera as Lorena Plaza de Cañero
- Miguel Augusto Rodríguez as Pitercito
- José Quijada as Lcdo. Constantino Sosa

== Mexican remake ==
TV Azteca 13 in Mexico produced their own version of La mujer de Judas. It stars Andrea Marti, Victor Gonzalez and Anette Michel.
