= Nadie me dirá como quererte =

- Genre: Telenovela
- Created by: Martín Hahn; Germán Aponte; Irene Calcaño; Teresa de la Parra; Cristina Policastro; Daniel Rojas
- Directed by: José Alcalde
- Starring: Marianela González; Hugo Vásquez; Juan Carlos Alarcón; Dora Mazzone; Raquel Yanez
- Opening theme: "Ni tú, ni nadie" by Mariana Vega
- Country of origin: Venezuela
- Original language: Spanish
- No. of episodes: 160

Production
- Executive producer: Leonor Sardi
- Producers: Ana Vizoso González; Ifigenia Rivas; Yenny Morales
- Production location: Caracas

Original release
- Network: RCTV Internacional
- Release: September 23, 2008 – April 1, 2009

Related
- La trepadora; Calle luna, Calle sol

Nadie me dirá como quererte (No one will tell me how to love you) is a Venezuela telenovela written by Martín Hahn and produced by Radio Caracas Televisión in 2008. It is inspired by the work Ifigenia of Teresa de la Parra.

Marianela González and Hugo Vásquez star as the main protagonists, while Dora Mazzone, Juan Carlos Alarcón and Raquel Yanez star as the main antagonists.

== Plot ==
María Eugenia Alonso is a woman who returns from France to Venezuela after learning of the death of her father. Although she has character and an advanced mentality, she discovers that her father left her inheritance in ruin, and she is forced to depend on her uncle and aunt Antonia Aristiguieta who despises her niece for her beauty and ideas. While adapting to her new way of life, she meets Gabriel Olmedo, a recently graduated doctor, passionate and persevering with whom she shares her revolutionary ideas. María Eugenia is a strong advocate for women's rights and gender equality. However, his aunt introduces him to César Leal, a wealthy, very macho entrepreneur who is willing to conquer her no matter what happens, thus putting her love for Gabriel in jeopardy.

== Cast ==
- Marianela González as María Eugenia Alonso
- Hugo Vásquez as Gabriel Olmedo
- Juan Carlos Alarcón as César Leal
- Dora Mazzone as Antonia de Aristigueta
- Raquel Yánez as Rita Monasterio
- Javier Vidal as Eduardo Aristigueta
- Hilda Abrahamz as Mercedes de Galindo
- Llena Aloma as Magnolia
- Nestor Bravo as Mateo Vargas
- Aileen Celeste as Cristina Iturbe
- Laura Chimaras as Ana Teresa Galindo
- Ivette Domínguez as Purita
- Lance Dos Ramos as Carlos Emilio Aristigueta
- Guillermo Dávila as Francisco Alonso
- Juan Carlos Gardié as Alberto Galindo
- Margarita Hernández as Clara Aristigueta
- Enrique Izquierdo as Adalberto
- Kiara as Laura Carbonell
- Alberto López as Alcalde Prudencio
- Yelena Maciel as Isabelita Pérez
- Carlos Marquez as El Juez
- Alejandro Mata as Ulices Stephanopolus
- Héctor Peña as Pedro Aristiguieta
- Rosario Prieto as Gregoria Salas
- Eben Renan as Tomás
- Betty Ruth as Eugenia Aristigueta
- Freddy Salazar as El Cura
- Jalymar Salomón as Fernanda
- Lucía Sanoja as Esperanza Santelíz
- Gonzalo Velutini as Doctor
- Manuel Villalba as Ministro Monasterios
- Diana Volpe as Ligia
