= Perla Farías =

Venezuelan director (born 1962)

Perla Farías Lombardini
- Born: April 23, 1962 (age 64); Venezuela
- Education: Northwestern University
- Occupations: Actor; director; producer; screenwriter; executive
- Relatives: José Ignacio Cabrujas (cousin)

Perla Farías Lombardini (born April 23, 1962) is a Venezuelan-American television director, producer, screenwriter, and an executive at Telemundo.

== Early life ==
She is the daughter of Italian actress Gioia Lombardini and Cuban director Daniel Farías. Her younger sister, Gioia Arismendi, is also an actress, and her brother, Dionisio, also worked in television. As a child, Farías reportedly did not enjoy the atmosphere of fame around her parents, but still chose to be an actress.

At the age of 14, Farías was enrolled in an international high school in Switzerland. She studied Social Communication at Northwestern University.

== Career ==
Farías was formerly a telenovela actress in Venezuela. Both uncomfortable with acting and unhappy with the storytelling of the typical novelas, she had her character killed off and then began a new style of telenovela in the United States, promoting her network Telemundo to overtake rivals Univision. She began writing with her cousin José Ignacio Cabrujas, who had encouraged her to write and not act because it suited her better. Her move to the United States to continue television production in 2005 is considered to be part of the Venezuelan diaspora.

Farías' productions have become popular in the regular prime-time markets: Juana la virgen was remade into Jane the Virgin, and La Reina del Sur's premiere beat out even English-language programming and stars an unconventional female lead. She has also been applauded for creating shows that depict Latin Americans positively and start discussions. She has described creating La Reina del Sur as "a big risk", but several years later was steering Telemundo into dramas with fewer telenovela stereotypes, accounting for growing change in tastes and the Spanish-language US broadcast sector.

In 2011 she helped write the musical Magicus: El Bosque Reciclad, created by her sister. In 2016 she was promoted to be Senior VP of Scripted Development at Telemundo, where she is also Head Writer.

In 2018, some of her creative works were seized and broadcast by RCTV.

== Television series ==
- Falsa identidad (2018)
- Bajo el mismo cielo (2015)
- Marido en Alquiler (2013)
- Flor Salvaje (2011)
- Alguien te mira (2010)
- ¿Donde está Elisa? (2010)
- Dame Chocolate (2007)
- La Tormenta (2005)
- Corazón partido (2 episodes - 2005)
- La Ley del silencio (2005)
- Ser bonita no basta (2005)
- ¡Anita, no te rajes! (2004)
- Juana la virgen (2002)
- Mis 3 hermanas (2000)
- Cambio de piel (1998)
- Sol de tentacion (1996)
- Divina obsesión (1992)
- Rubí rebelde (1989)
