= Hoy te vi =

- Genre: Telenovela; Romance; Drama
- Created by: Basilio Álvarez; Laura Bottome
- Directed by: Renato Gutiérrez
- Starring: Sandy Olivares; Chantal Baudaux
- Opening theme: Hoy te vi by Máximo Nivel
- Country of origin: Venezuela
- Original language: Spanish
- No. of episodes: 122

Production
- Executive producer: Arsenia Rodrigues
- Producers: Ana Vizoso González; Jaime Dos Reis
- Production location: Caracas
- Production company: RCTV

Original release
- Network: RCTV
- Release: August 3, 1998 – January 26, 1999

Hoy te vi is a Venezuelan telenovela that was produced by Radio Caracas Televisión in 1998, and based on a story written by Basilio Álvarez and Laura Bottome. The telenovela was a youthful production focusing on adolescents and their concerns. This telenovela lasted 122 episodes and was distributed internationally by RCTV International.

== Plot ==
Nicolás, Iván, Ricardo, Napoleón and Gerardo are five teenagers searching for a dream that will change their lives forever. They form part of a musical band called Máximo Nivel, and this musical group is responsible for giving life to this story full adventures, love, joys and teenage madness.

The main protagonist of the history surrounds music, where the whole plot revolves. Through music, these five boys build their dreams of becoming famous, challenge their families, contribute to a noble cause, or enjoy the moment until life allows. Along with the boys, they were always five women who accompanies them and provides them their love and support, and together they overcome barriers and obstacles that made it difficult to reach their goal, sometimes suffering the consequences of disappointments, until they discover that in many situations, money is not the most important thing, but on the contrary, good people always obtain better things than money.

The young characters pursue success and fame while facing opposition and interference from their families. An old friend helps them keep their activities secret, allowing them to pursue their ambitions. Their relationships develop into a close bond as they experience success, failure, and the consequences of pursuing fame. The story explores themes of passion, friendship, communication, personal development, and coming of age.

== Cast ==
- Sandy Olivares as Nicolas Pereira Gómez
- Chantal Baudaux as Jessica Linares Urdaneta
- Alejandro Loynaz as Luis Guillermo Villanueva (Luis G.)
- Luis La Rosa as Ricardo Pereira Gómez
- Concetta Lo Dolce as Andrea D'Ascoli Borsari [de Cuevas]
- Nacho Huett as Iván José Pereira Gómez
- Ámbar Díaz as Josefina 'Fefi' Serrano
- Ramón Castro as Napoleón Serrano
- Mirela Mendoza as Liliana Mungarrieta Henríquez
- Hernan Diaz as Gerardo Arrieta
- Natalia Romero as Teresa del Carmen 'Teresita' Robles
- Damian Genovese as Jorge Cuevas Miquelarena
- Betzabeth Duque as Tibisay Luna
- Joel Borges as Daniel 'Danny' Ríos Vizcarrondo
- Manuel Díquez as himself
- Jeronimo Gil as John William 'Johnny' Fuentes
- Luis Daniel Gómez as Esteban
- Hernán Mejía as Caliche
- Iván Tamayo as Augusto Linares Zavaleta
- Rebeca Costoya as Catalina Urdaneta de Linares
- Ernesto Balzi as Ivan Jose Pereira
- Flor Elena González as Eva Gomez de Pereira
- Miguel Alcántara as Atanasio Arrieta
- María Cristina Lozada as Eusebia Robles y Palomar
- Alejo Felipe as Benito Castro Carras (Sr. Casca)
- Héctor Campobello as Mario D'Ascoli
- José Félix Cárdenas as Dr. Dumpiérrez
- Jaime Urribarri as Christian
- Andy Rodríguez as Jose 'Cheíto' Pereira Gómez
- Yorman González as Antonio 'Toñito' D'Ascoli Borsari
- Karen Pita as Ninoska Linares Urdaneta
- Andreina De Sousa as Karina Linares Urdaneta
- Gisvel Ascanio as Isabella Gutierrez
- Eduardo Gadea Pérez as Grandfather Iván José Pereira (spirit)
- Sheyene Gerardi as Perla
