= Amantes (TV series) =

- Genre: Telenovela; Romance; Drama
- Created by: Luis Colmenares
- Written by: Julio César Mármol O. Irene Calcaño; Iraida Tapias; José Manuel Espiño; Gennys Pérez; Francy Rodríguez; Luis Colmenares
- Directed by: Tony Rodríguez; Nicolás Di Blasi
- Starring: Chantal Baudaux; Juan Carlos Alarcón; Aroldo Betancourt; Veronica Schneider; Jean Carlo Simancas; Carlota Sosa; Gustavo Rodríguez
- Theme music composer: Simón Díaz
- Opening theme: "Qué vale más" by Simón Díaz and Jeremías
- Country of origin: Venezuela
- Original language: Spanish
- No. of episodes: 122

Production
- Executive producer: Carmen Cecilia Urbaneja
- Producer: José Gerardo Guillén
- Editor: Alexis Montero
- Camera setup: Multi-camera
- Running time: 41-44 minutes
- Production company: Radio Caracas Televisión

Original release
- Network: RCTV
- Release: May 28, 2005 – February 22, 2006

Related
- Ser bonita no basta; Por todo lo alto

Amantes (English: Lovers) is a Venezuelan telenovela written by Luis Colmenares and produced by RCTV in 2005.

On July 28, 2005, RCTV started broadcasting Amantes weekdays at 9:00pm, replacing Ser bonita no basta. The last episode was broadcast on February 22, 2006.

Chantal Baudaux and Juan Carlos Alarcón star as the protagonists while Aroldo Betancourt and Veronica Schneider star as antagonists.

== Plot ==
It is the dawn of the 20th century that ushers the years of wonder over new discoveries, inventions and the First World War. During this time, Isabel Sarmiento falls in love with Camilo Rivera and gives herself to him, not knowing that Saúl Bejarano a primitive landowner with power, had already decided to marry her. The girl must sacrifice her love, bound by a family debt and Saúl's threats, as he had witnessed a murder committed by Isabel's father.

She agrees to be Saúl's wife. She has no other option: she fears her family's ruin, jail for her father and knows that her lover's life is in danger. Camilo leaves as soon as the wedding is held, believing he has lost Isabel forever.

== Cast ==
=== Main cast ===
- Chantal Baudaux as Isabel Sarmiento de Bejarano
- Juan Carlos Alarcón as Camilo Rivera
- Aroldo Betancourt as Saúl Bejarano
- Verónica Schneider as Erika Hoffman
- Jean Carlo Simancas as Humberto Rivera
- Carlota Sosa as Eugenia Vda. de Sarmiento
- Gustavo Rodríguez as Virgilio Sarmiento

=== Supporting cast ===
- Dad Dáger as Leonor Rivera
- Iván Tamayo as Consenso Mendible
- Juan Carlos Gardie as Atanasio
- Esperanza Magaz as Matea
- Ana Castell as Arawaca
- Emerson Rondón as Lucas
- Carlos Felipe Álvarez as Francisco
- Yelena Maciel as Teresa Rivera
- Gioia Arismendi as Carmelina
- Samuel González as Gudelio Gomez
- Katyuska Rivas as Celina
- Roraima Karina Viera
- Katherine Viera
- Eduardo Ortega as Vincent De Boer
- Catherina Cardozo as La Romana
- Carmen Landaeta as Etilita
- Carlos Herrera as Coyote
- Gerardo Soto as Brandon Griffith
- Mark Colina as Lisandro
- Candy Montesinos as Otillia Barrientos
- Reinaldo Zavarce as Alirio Bejarano
- Pedro Durán as Ismael Gómez
- Tony Rodríguez as Nerio Pantoja
- Eric Noriega as Padre Nicanor
- Jean Samuel Khoury as Alirio Bejarano
- Giselle Pita as Teresita
- Ogladih Mayorga as Charito
- Alexandra Rodríguez as Finita
- Jessika Grau as Consuelo
- Eva De Denghy as Consuelo's mother
