= Raquel Yánez =

Venezuelan actress (1986)

Raquel Yanez
- Born: Carmen Raquel Yánez Machado; 2 April 1986 (age 39); Caracas, Venezuela
- Occupation: Actress

Carmen Raquel Yánez Machado (born 2 April 1986) known as Raquel Yánez, is a Venezuelan telenovela actress and model.

== Biography ==
Raquel's acting career started when she was undergoing her studies in the School of Arts at Universidad Central de Venezuela. She spent 3 years studying dance at the Instituto Universitario de Danza and IX Taller de Jóvenes Artistas del Grupo Theja.

Her first work was released under the name El Público, thus giving her more exposure to the world of acting.

In 2012, she interpreted the role of a villain in the telenovela Válgame Dios as Nieves Pérez, a firefighter.

== Filmography ==
=== Films ===
- El hijo de mi marido y sin prurito alguno (2013)

=== Telenovelas ===
- Mi prima Ciela (2007) as Silvia Constanza Toscani Ávila
- Nadie me dirá como quererte (2008) as Rita Monasterios
- Libres como el viento (2009) as Amarelis Sarmiento
- La Banda (Boomerang) (2011) as Veronica
- Válgame Dios (2012) as Nieves Pérez
- Dulce Amargo (2013) as Gatúbela
- Entre tu amor y mi amor (2016) as Yuliska Galindo

=== Theater ===
- El Público (2003/2004)
- Día Internacional de la Danza (2004)
- Prometeo Encadenado (2005)
- Autorretrato de Artista Con Barba Y Pumpa (2006)
- Magicus, el bosque reciclado (2012)
