= Rhandy Piñango =

Venezuelan actor

- Born: November 29, 1971 (age 53); Caracas, Venezuela
- Occupation: Actor

Rhandy Piñango (born 29 November 1971) is a Venezuelan telenovela, film and theater actor.

== Biography ==
Piñango was born in Caracas at the Maternidad Concepción Palacios hospital, being the only son to parents José de Jesús Piñango and Mariela Pinto.

When he was a teenager, Piñango became attracted to drama and acting. After finishing his high school education at the Liceo Leopoldo Aguerrevere, he enrolled in acting classes at RCTV's acting school Luz Columba, under the instruction of professor Nelson Ortega. His first television role was in the telenovela La Llaman Mariamor in 1996.

After acting in various RCTV telenovelas, Piñango moved to Venevisión in 2005 to participate in the telenovela El amor las vuelve locas. In 2011, he played the role of a villain in the telenovela El árbol de Gabriel.

== Filmography ==
Films and television
Year	Title	Role	Notes
1996	La llaman Mariamor		Television debut
2000	Mis 3 hermanas		
2003	La mujer de Judas	Calixto Romero / Calixto	
2004	Amor del bueno	Luis	
2005	El amor las vuelve locas		
2006	El rey de los huevones	Mario	Film debut
2007	Aunque mal paguen	Ignacio	
2009	Los misterios del amor	Vladimir Quintana	
2009	Tomasa Tequiero	Augusto	
2011	El arbol de Gabriel	Ricardo Arismendi	
2014	Corazón esmeralda	Jaime Batista	107 episodes

== Theater ==
- Historias de Cerro Arriba
- Cada Batman Tiene su Robin
- O Todos o Ninguno
- Los Peces del Acuario
- Romero y Julieta
- Apartamento de Soltero
