= Gioia Arismendi =

Venezuelan actress and model (born 1984)

- Born: Gioia Denise Arismendi Lombardini; January 5, 1984 (age 42); Caracas, Venezuela
- Occupation: Actress

Gioia Denise Arismendi Lombardini, better known as Gioia Arismendi (born January 5, 1984, in Caracas) is a Venezuelan actress and model.

== Biography ==
Arismendi grew up in a family of artists. Her mother Gioia Lombardini is an actress and presenter familiar to Venezuelan television, her father is a publicist while her sister is a novelist. From a young age, Arismendi was interested in drama and acting. However, her father encouraged her to finish high school before she could pursue acting further. After finishing her high school studies at Agustín Codazzi Lyceum, she enrolled for a Bachelor of Arts course at Universidad Central de Venezuela.

== Career beginnings ==
Arismendi studied acting at the Taller de Teatro Luz Columba under the instruction of professor Nelson Orteaga who is responsible for the career development of various RCTV actors. Her first television appearance was in 1992 in the telenovela Las dos Dianas. Since then, she has participated in several RCTV telenovelas such as Divina obsesión, Mis 3 Hermanas, Juana la virgen, La cuaima and Camaelona.

In 2008, she joined Venevisión to participate in the telenovela Torrente in the role of Maruja Briceño.

In 2011, she was part of the cast of the telenovela Natalia del Mar in the role of Candy.

== Telenovelas ==
- Amor Secreto (2015) – Paula Guerrero
- Las Bandidas (2013) – Marta Romero
- Natalia del Mar (2011) – Candy Romero
- Torrente (2008) – Maruja Briceño Mendizábal
- Por todo lo alto (2006)
- Amantes (2005)
- Juana la virgen (2002) – Lili
- Mis 3 Hermanas (2000)
- Divina obsesión (1992)
- Las dos Dianas (1992) – Dianita niña

== Theater ==
- Malos Entendidos (2014)
