= Martín Hahn =

Venezuelan writer and playwright (born 1964)

- Born: Martín Enrique Hahn; September 14, 1964 (age 60); Barinas, Venezuela
- Occupation(s): Writer, Playwright

Martín Hahn (born September 14, 1964) is a Venezuelan writer and playwright known for writing mystery and suspense telenovelas.

== Biography ==
Martín was born Martín Enrique Hahn in the Venezuelan state of Barinas in 1964. He graduated with a Bachelor of Arts degree from Central University of Venezuela UCV and later went to Puerto Rico to study film.

In 1990, he returned to Venezuela and started working at RCTV. In 1992, he temporarily joined as a dialogue developer on the telenovela Por Estas Calles. His first writing job came in 1994 when he shared credits with Salvador Garmendia on writing the telenovela El desafío for RCTV.

== Career ==
=== RCTV ===
Martín continued working as a writer for RCTV and once again worked with Salvador Garmendia on the telenovela Aunque me Cueste la Vida in 1998. In 2000, he wrote Angélica Pecado which became his first mystery and suspense telenovela which was a huge success in Venezuela. In 2002, he wrote his second suspense telenovela La mujer de Judas which was sold to many countries around the world and achieved high ratings on RCTV.

In 2004, he wrote his third mystery telenovela titled Estrambótica Anastasia for RCTV and the following year, he wrote Amor a Palos which were broadcast on RCTV.

In 2006, he wrote the final stages of the telenovela Y los declaro marido y mujer which was being filmed in Isla Margarita, Nueva Esparta.

Later on in 2008, he wrote Nadie me dirá como quererte which was an adaptation of a novel by Teresa de la Parra. This was the last telenovela he wrote for RCTV.

=== Venevisión ===
After 14 years working for RCTV, he moved to Venevisión to write the gothic, suspense telenovela La viuda joven which achieved high ratings that year and sold to other countries around the world.

In 2012, he wrote Mi ex me tiene ganas which was a telenovela mixed with mystery and humor.

== Filmography ==
Year	Title	Notes
1994	El desafío	RCTV
1998	Aunque me Cueste la Vida	RCTV
2000	Angélica Pecado	RCTV
2002	La mujer de Judas	RCTV
2004	Estrambótica Anastasia	RCTV
2005	Amor a Palos	RCTV
2006	Y los declaro marido y mujer	RCTV
2008	Nadie me dirá como quererte	RCTV
2011	La viuda joven	Venevisión
2012	Mi ex me tiene ganas	Venevisión
