= Y los declaro marido y mujer =

- Also known as: Amor infiel
- Genre: Telenovela
- Created by: Xiomara Moreno; Cristina Policastro; Martín Hahn
- Directed by: Nicolás Di Blasi
- Starring: Marjorie de Sousa; Juan Pablo Raba; Veronica Schneider; Hugo Vasquez; Marlene De Andrade; Carlos Guillermo Haydon; Christina Dieckmann
- Opening theme: Arenita, playita by Cuarto Poder
- Country of origin: Venezuela
- Original language: Spanish
- No. of episodes: 116

Production
- Executive producer: Carmen Cecilia Urbaneja
- Producer: José Gerardo Guillén
- Production locations: Margarita Island; Caracas
- Running time: 45 minutes
- Production company: RCTV

Original release
- Network: RCTV
- Release: September 25, 2006 – March 13, 2007

Related
- Por todo lo alto; Camaleona

Y los declaro marido y mujer (English title:And I now pronounce you husband and wife) is a Venezuelan telenovela produced and broadcast by RCTV between 2006 and 2007 and distributed internationally by RCTV International.

Marjorie de Sousa and Juan Pablo Raba starred as the main protagonists with Veronica Schneider, Hugo Vasquez and Christina Dieckmann accompanying them as co-protagonists. Marlene De Andrade and Carlos Guillermo Haydon starred as the main antagonists.

== Synopsis ==
Four women living on Margarita Island, Saoia, Elizabeth, Rebecca and Eloína, deal with fidelity and love.

== Cast ==
- Marjorie de Sousa as Saoia Mujica
- Marlene De Andrade as Elizabeth Zamora.
- Verónica Schneider as Rebeca Ponti
- Christina Dieckmann as Eloína Díaz
- Juan Pablo Raba as Juan Andrés Gutiérrez
- Carlos Guillermo Haydon as Efraín Tovar
- Hugo Vásquez as Gustavo Sampedro
- Julie Restifo as Lucía Mujica de Spert
- Dora Mazzone as Rosa Segarra de Mujica
- Aroldo Betancourt as Jacobo Mujica
- Javier Vidal as Gustavo Sampedro (padre)
- Juan Carlos Gardié as Rigoberto Gutiérrez
- Kiara as Lola
- Alberto Alifa as Ismael Zamora
- Yelena Maciel as Eulalia "Lali" Spert Mujica
- Carlos Felipe Álvarez as Bernardo Romero
- Luis Fernando Sosa as Luis Mega
- Norma Matos as Filomena de Sanmpedro
- Samuel González as Ramiro Figueroa
- Juan Carlos Tarazona as Rodrigo Aular
- Brenda Hanst as Meche
- Ezzio Cavallaro as El Hierro
- César Flores as Sebastián Lira
- Susana Kolster as Tibisay Tovar Díaz
- Ligia Petit as Vanessa
- Andy Rodríguez as Francisco Gutiérrez
- César Suárez as Matías Domínguez
- Llena Aloma
