= 1992 in Spanish television =

This is a list of Spanish television related events in 1992.

== Events ==
- 18 June: After Grupo Zeta, backed by Rupert Murdoch & Banesto, becomes major stockholder of Antena 3, its CEO, Antonio Asensio is appointed President of the TV channel.
- 25 July: 1992 Summer Olympics opening ceremony is held in Barcelona, and broadcast live worldwide.
- 5 December: Televisión Española stages in Valencia the OTI Festival 1992, which is broadcast live throughout Ibero-America. The song "A dónde voy sin ti", written by Chema Purón and performed by Francisco representing Spain, wins the festival.

== Debuts ==
Title	Channel	Debut	Performers/Host	Genre
24 horas	Canal +	1992-04-02		News
A salto de cama	Telecinco	1993-03-05	Alfredo Amestoy	Comedy
Acompáñame	TVE-1	1992-03-22	Isabel Gemio	Variety Show
Ahora o nunca	TVE-1	1992-08-07	Ramón García	Variety Show
Al ataque	Antena 3	1992-09-29	Alfonso Arús	Comedy
Amigos olímpicos	TVE-1	1992-04-01		Quiz Show
Área deportiva	La 2	1992-04-06		Sport
Ases de humor	Telecinco	1992-02-28		Comedy
¡Ay, vida mía!	TVE-1	1992-05-01	Mary Carmen	Variety Show
Barcelona: Juegos de sociedad	TVE-1	1992-07-26	Inka Martí	Variety Show
Bellezas en la nieve	Telecinco	1992-02-08	Andoni Ferreño	Quiz Show
Caja de risa	TVE-1	1992-07-22	Julio Herrero	Comedy
Carros de juego	TVE-1	1992-04-24	Jordi Hurtado	Quiz Show
Como la vida misma	Antena 3	1992-04-01	Verónica Forqué	Talk Show
Con ustedes... Pedro Ruiz	Antena 3	1992-11-23	Pedro Ruiz	Comedy
Contacto con tacto	Telecinco	1992-09-10	Bertín Osborne	Dating show
Corazón de melón	Antena 3	1992-03-23	Consuelo Berlanga	Quiz Show
Crónicas del mal	TVE-1	1992-10-09		Drama Series
De tal palo	TVE-1	1992-02-03	Ramoncín	Quiz Show
Delfy and His Friends	TVE-1	1992-04-17		Anime
Deporte noche	TVE-1	1992-03-21		Sport
Economía en La 2	La 2	1992-01-11		Science/Culture
El huevo de colón	Telecinco	1992-07-04	Javier Gurruchaga	Variety Show
El informe del día	La 2	1992-11-02	José Antonio Martínez Soler	News
El menú de cada día	TVE-1	1992-03-30	Karlos Arguiñano	Cooking Show
El mejor deporte	La 2	1992-07-06		Sport
El Quijote de Miguel de Cervantes	TVE-1	1992-01-29	Fernando Rey	Drama Series
El show de la una	TVE-1	1992-10-19	Fernando Carrillo	Variety Show
El super gordo	Antena 3	1992-07-19	Irma Soriano	Quiz Show
El superjuego	Antena 3	1992-11-13	Diana Lázaro	Quiz Show
En escena	TVE-1	1992-05-02		Music
Encantados de conocerte	Antena 3	1992-10-26	Carmen Maura	Talk Show
Estamos de vacaciones	TVE-1	1992-06-14		Children
Fanático	TVE-1	1992-11-02	Luis Miguel Torrecillas	Variety Show
Fórmula fútbol	Antena 3	1992-10-05	José María Casanovas	Sport
Goles son amores	Telecinco	1992-11-23	Manolo Escobar	Variety Show
Grandes intérpretes en La 2	La 2	1992-07-05	José Luis Vidaechea	Music
Hasta luego cocodrilo	TVE-1	1992-03-18	Cristina Marcos	Drama Series
¡Hola Raffaella!	TVE-1	1992-05-08	Raffaella Carrá	Variety Show
Humor cinco soles	Telecinco	1992-06-27	Juanito Navarro	Comedy
Inocente, inocente	Telemadrid	1992-11-19	Juanma López Iturriaga	Comedy
Jara y sedal	La 2	1992-10-21		Sport
Juguemos al trivial	TVE-1	1992-01-26	Pepe Navarro	Quiz Show
La aventura del saber	La 2	1992-10-13	María San Juan	Science/Culture
La isla del tesoro	La 2	1992-10-05	Antonio López Campillo	Science/Culture
La máquina de la verdad	Telecinco	1993-12-16	Julián Lago	Talk Show
La noche de Hermida	Antena 3	1992-10-28	Jesús Hermida	Talk Show
La vida es juego	La 2	1992-04-05	Constantino Romero	Quiz Show
Longitud, latitud	La 2	1992-02-10	Felipe Mellizo	Science
Los años vividos	TVE-1	1992-01-19		Documentary
Los domingos por Norma	Antena 3	1992-11-15	Norma Duval	Variety Show
Luna de miel	FORTA	1992-11-25	Mayra Gómez Kemp	Game Show
Me traes de cabeza	TVE-1	1992-10-25	Juan Navarro	Music
Menos lobos	TVE-1	1992-10-11	Pep Munné	Sitcom
Mucho Jazz	TVE-1	1992-05-03		Music
No sé bailar	La 2	1992-07-04	Emilio Gutiérrez Caba	Sitcom
No te cortes	TVE-1	1992-02-01	José Luis Viñas	Youth
Nuevo día	TVE-1	1992-04-09		Children
Objetivo indiscreto	TVE-1	1992-03-05	Antonio Resines	Comedy
Para nosotros	TVE-1	1992-09-21		Children
Para ti...	Antena 3	1992-10-04	Jacqueline de la Vega	Fashion
Pasando	TVE-1	1992-01-27	Alejandro Noeda	Youth
Pase dos	La 2	1992-10-05		Variety Show
Peligrosamente juntas	La 2	1992-01-30	Inka Martí	Talk Show
Pinnic	TVE-1	1992-11-16	Pere Ponce	Children
Pressing fútbol	Telecinco	1992-03-17		Sport
Que bello es nacer	La 2	1992-04-10	Cristina de los Santos	Quiz Show
Quédate con la copla	Antena 3	1992-03-27	Consuelo Berlanga	Music
Queremos saber	Antena 3	1992-11-17	Mercedes Milá	Talk Show
Querida Concha	Telecinco	1992-10-18	Concha Velasco	Variety Show
Queridos cómicos	La 2	1992-10-22		Documentary
Queridos padres	Telecinco	1992-01-27	Concha Velasco	Quiz Show
Quién sabe dónde	La 2	1993-02-22	Ernesto Sáenz de Buruaga	Reality Show
Quiéreme mucho	Antena 3	1992-07-09	Miguel Ortiz	Music
¿Quieres que te lo cuente?	TVE-1	1992-01-27		Children
Sabor a Lolas	Antena 3	1992-10-30	Lola Flores	Variety Show
Sabor latino	TVE-1	1992-08-11		Music
Se acabó la siesta	Telecinco	1992-10-05	Laura Valenzuela	Variety Show
Se busca una estrella	Antena 3	1992-10-10	Teresa Rabal	Talent show
Sin vergüenza	TVE-1	1992-06-29	Ángeles Martín	Quiz Show
Supermarket	Antena 3	1992-02-24	Enrique Simón	Quiz Show
T.D. el verano	Telecinco	1992-07-15	Benavides	Comedy
Tango	TVE-1	1992-04-22	Sancho Gracia	Drama Series
Telebuten	Telecinco	1992-10-10	Beatriz Rico	Children
Tele-expo magazine	TVE-1	1992-01-25		Variety Show
Televisión líquida	Canal +	1992-05-22		Variety Show
Tercera planta, inspección fiscal	TVE-1	1992-03-25	José Sazatornil	Sitcom
Testimonio	La 2	1992-03-03		Religion
Tiempo de creer	La 2	1992-05-10		Religion
Todo por la pasta	Telecinco	1992-11-11	Sancho Gracia	Videos
¡Vaya fauna!	Antena 3	1992-11-23	Chari Gómez Miranda	Quiz Show
Videominuto	Canal +	1992-04-23		Videos
Viva la salud	Antena 3	1992-03-30	Bartolomé Beltrán	Science/Culture
Vivan los compis	Telecinco	1992-02-16	Leticia Sabater	Dating show
Vivir, vivir... que bonito	Antena 3	1992-10-08	Pepe Navarro	Variety Show
Xuxa Park	Telecinco	1992-03-12	Xuxa	Children

== Television shows ==
- La 1
  - Telediario (1957– )
  - Un, dos, tres... responda otra vez (1972–2004)
  - Estudio estadio (1972–2005)
  - Informe Semanal (1973– )
  - Parlamento (1978–2014)
  - El Precio justo (1988–2001)
  - Brigada Central (1989–1993)
  - Telepasión española (1990– )
  - Un Día es un día (1990–1993)
  - La Mujer de tu vida (1990–1994)
  - No te rías, que es peor (1990–1995)
  - Club Disney (1990–1996)
  - Vídeos de primera (1990–1998)
  - Pasa la vida (1991–1996)
  - A pie de página (1991–1992)
- La 2
  - Al filo de lo imposble (1982– )
  - Pueblo de Dios (1982– )
  - Últimas preguntas (1983– )
  - En portada (1984– )
  - Estadio 2 (1984–2007)
  - Metrópolis (1985– )
  - Documentos TV (1986– )
  - Tendido cero (1986– )
  - La Tabla redonda (1990–1993)
  - Días de cine (1991– )
  - El rescate del talismán (1991–1994)
  - Clip, clap, video (1991–1995)
  - Cifras y Letras (1991–1996)
  - Línea 900 (1991–2007)
- Antena 3
  - Antena 3 Noticias (1990– )
  - De tú a tú (1990–1993)
  - La Guardería (1990–1993)
  - La Merienda (1990–1994)
  - Viva la vida (1991–1993)
  - Farmacia de guardia (1991–1995)
- Telecinco
  - Informativos Telecinco (1990– )
  - Bellezas al agua (1990–1993)
  - Entre platos anda el juego (1990–1993)
  - Hablando se entiende la gente (1990–1993)
  - La Quinta marcha (1990–1993)
  - Humor amarillo (1990–1995)
  - Su media naranja (1990–1996)
  - Telecupón (1990–1998)
  - A mediodía, alegría (1991–1993)
  - Hablando se entiende la basca (1991–1993)
  - Humor cinco estrellas (1991–1993)
  - Superguay (1991–1993) Infantil
  - Desayuna con alegría (1991–1994)
  - Vivan los novios (1991–1994)
- Canal+
  - El día después (1990–2005)
  - Redacción (1990–2005)
  - Del 40 al 1 (1991–1998)

== Ending this year ==
- La 1
  - Hablando claro (1987–1992)
  - Juegos sin fronteras (1988–1992)
  - Rockopop (1988–1992)
  - Cada mañana (1991–1992)
  - Las Chicas de hoy en día (1991–1992)
  - De par en par (1991–1992)
  - Primero izquierda (1991–1992)
  - Taller Mecánico (1991–1992)
  - A pie de página (1991–1992)
- La 2
  - El Tiempo es oro (1987–1992)
  - Ponte las pilas (1991–1992)
- Antena 3
  - El Gordo (1990–1992)
  - Noche de lobos (1990–1992)
  - La ruleta de la fortuna (1990–1992)
  - El Programa de Hermida (1991–1992)
  - Tan contentos (1991–1992)
- Telecinco
  - Tele 5 ¿dígame? (1990–1992)
  - Tutti frutti (1990–1992)
  - VIP Noche (1990–1992)
  - Desde Palma con amor (1991–1992)
  - Futbolísimo (1991–1992)

== Foreign series debuts in Spain ==
English title	Spanish title	Original title	Channel	Country	Performers
A Man Called Hawk	Un hombre llamado Halcón		Antena 3	USA	Avery Brooks
A Pup Named Scooby-Doo	Un cachorro llamado Scooby-Doo		La 1	USA	
Abigail	Abigail		La 1	VEN	Catherine Fulop, Fernando Carrillo
Adventures of the Gummi Bears	Osos Gummi		La 2	USA	
Against the Law	Enfrentados con la ley		Antena 3	USA	Michael O'Keefe
Alien Nation	Alien Nación		La 1	USA	Gary Graham
American Gladiators	Gladiadores americanos		Antena 3	USA	Mike Adamle
---	Amor prohibido		La 1	MEX	Claudia Islas
---	Atrévete		Antena 3	VEN	Caridad Canelón
Babar	Babar		Canal +	FRA CAN	
Baywatch	Los vigilantes de la playa		Antena 3	USA	David Hasselhoff
Bottom	La pareja Basura		Canal +	UK	Rik Mayall, Ade Edmondson
Brooklyn Bridge	El puente de Brooklyn		Canal +	USA	Marion Ross
Bucky O'Hare and the Toad Wars	Bucky O'Hare		Antena 3	USA	
Capitol Critters	Max en la casa blanca		Canal +	USA	Neil Patrick Harris
Captain Planet and the Planeteers	Capitán Planeta		FORTA	USA	
Captain Power and the Soldiers of the Future	Capitán Power		Antena 3	USA	
Cara sucia	Cara sucia		Antena 3	VEN	Guillermo Dávila
Davis Rules	Aquí mando yo		Canal +	USA	Randy Quaid
Dirty Dancing	Dirty Dancing		La 1	USA	Patrick Cassidy
Dragon Ball	Bola de Dragón	Doragon Bōru	FORTA	JAP	
Dragon Ball Z	Bola de Dragón Z	Doragon Bōru Zetto	FORTA	JAP	
Eddie Dodd	Eddie Dodd		FORTA	USA	Treat Williams
Eerie, Indiana	Eerie Indiana		Canal +	USA	Omri Katz
Ewoks	Los Ewoks		FORTA	CAN USA	
Extralarge	El maxipolicía	Detective Extralarge	Telecinco	ITA	Bud Spencer
Fathers and Sons: A German Tragedy	El honor de la sangre	Väter und Söhne – Eine deutsche Tragödie	La 2	GER	Burt Lancaster, Julie Christie
Freddy's Nightmares	Las pesadillas de Freddy		Telecinco	USA	Robert Englund
Frosty's Winter Wonderland	El Invierno Maravilloso de Frosty		Telecinco	USA	
Get a Life	Búscate la vida		Canal +	USA	Chris Elliott
Hard Time on Planet Earth	Tiempos difíciles en el planeta tierra		La 1	USA	
Hardcastle and McCormick	Dos contra el crimen		Telecinco	USA	Daniel Hugh Kelly, Brian Keith
Harry and the Hendersons	Harry y los Henderson		La 1	USA	John Lithgow, Melinda Dillon
Hot Shots	Tras la pista del crimen		Antena 3	CAN	Booth Savage
Island Son	El hijo de la isla		La 1	USA	Richard Chamberlain
Karate Kat	Karate kat		FORTA	USA	
Kimagure Orange Road	Johnny y sus amigos	Kimagure Orenji Rōdo	Telecinco	JAP	
---	Las dos Dianas		Telecinco	VEN	Carlos Mata, Nohely Arteaga, Lupita Ferrer
---	La vorágine		La 1	COL	Florina Lemaitre
Life Goes On	A fuerza de cariño		Telecinco	USA	Bill Smitrovich, Chris Burke (actor)
---	Los chicos de los Alpes	La compète: Pierre et Isa	Canal +	FRA	
Major Dad	Papá comandante		Telecinco	USA	Gerald McRaney
---	María de nadie		Telecinco	ARG	Grecia Colmenares
Max Glick	Max Glick		Canal +	CAN	Linda Kash
Max Monroe: Loose Cannon	Max Monroe, policía de Los Ángeles		Antena 3	USA	Shadoe Stevens
McClain's Law	La ley de McClain		Antena 3	USA	James Arness
Melrose Place	Melrose Place		Telecinco	USA	H.Locklear, G.Show, C. Thorne-Smith, A.Shue
Miller & Mueller	Miller y Mueller		La 1	USA	Suzanne Savoy
Mom P.I.	Mamá, detective privado		Canal +	CAN	Rosemary Dunsmore
Mr. Bogus	Mr.Bogus		Canal +	USA	
My Secret Identity	Mi doble identidad		La 1	USA	Jerry O'Connell
My Sister Sam	Mi hermana Sam		Antena 3	USA	Pam Dawber, Rebecca Schaeffer
My Two Dads	Mis dos padres		FORTA	USA	Paul Reiser, Greg Evigan
Neon Rider	El jinete Neón		Antena 3	CAN	Winston Rekert
Ohara	Ohara		Antena 3	USA	Pat Morita
Once Upon a Time... The Americas	Érase una vez... las Américas	Il était une fois... les Amériques	La 1	FRA	
P.S. I Luv U	Contacto en California		Antena 3	USA	Greg Evigan, Connie Selleca
Petrocelli	Petrocelli		Telecinco	USA	Barry Newman
Picket Fences	Picket Fences		Antena 3	USA	Tom Skerritt
---	Por estas calles		Antena 3	VEN	Marialejandra Martín
Rags to Riches	Época de cambios		La 1	USA	Joseph Bologna
Reap the Whirlwind	Buena esperanza	Bonne Espérance	La 1	FRA	Jean-Pierre Bouvier
Roc	Roc		Canal +	USA	Ella Joyce, Charles S. Dutton
Sailor Moon	Sailor Moon	Bishōjo Senshi Sērā Mūn	Antena 3	JAP	
Droids	Los Droids		FORTA	CAN USA	
Stingray	Stingray		FORTA	USA	Nick Mancuso
Strauss Dynasty	La Dinastía Strauss		La 1	AUT	Edward Fox
Tarzan	Tarzán		Telecinco	FRA CAN	Wolf Larson
The Adventures of Black Beauty	El corcel negro		Antena 3	UK	Judi Bowker
The Adventures of Skippy	Skippy		Telecinco	AUS	Andrew Clarke
The Adventures of Tintin	Las aventuras de Tintín		Canal +	FRA CAN	
The Centurions	Centuriones		Antena 3	USA	
The Houndcats	Houndcats		Antena 3	USA	
The Legend of Prince Valiant	La leyenda del Príncipe Valiente		La 1	USA	
The New Archie and Sabrina Hour	Archie y Sabrina		Antena 3	USA	
The New Lassie	La nueva Lassie		La 1	USA	Will Estes
The Oldest Rookie	Novato y veterano		La 1	USA	Paul Sorvino
The Tracey Ullman Show	El show de Tracey Ullman		La 2	USA	Tracey Ullman
The Trials of Rosie O'Neill	Los casos de Rosie O'Neill		Antena 3	USA	Sharon Gless
The Young Indiana Jones Chronicles	Las aventuras del joven Indiana Jones		Antena 3	USA	Sean Patrick Flanery
Thirtysomething	Treinta y tantos		La 2	USA	Ken Olin
Three's a Crowd	Tres son mogollón		Telecinco	USA	John Ritter
ThunderCats	Thundercats		Antena 3	USA	
Tropical Heat	Calor Tropical		Antena 3	USA	Rob Stewart
True Blue	Hombres de azul		Antena 3	USA	John Michael Bolger
---	Tu mundo y el mío		La 1	ARG	Nohely Arteaga
Wake, Rattle & Roll	Despierta peque y al loro		Canal +	USA	
We Are Seven	Somos 7		Antena 3	UK	Christopher Mitchum
Where's Wally?	¿Dónde está Wally?		Antena 3	UK	
Who's the Boss?	¿Quién es el jefe?		La 1	USA	Tony Danza
Widget	Widget		Antena 3	USA	

== Births ==
- 19 July – Eduardo García, actor.
- 29 August – Elena Rivera, actress
- 20 September – David Castillo, actor.

== Deaths ==
- 2 March – Cándida Losada, actress, 76
- 7 May – Simón Cabido, cómico, 61
- 24 May – Javier Basilio, journalist, 63
- 23 September – Mary Santpere, actress, 79
- 16 November – Estanis González, actor, 67

== See also ==
- 1992 in Spain
- List of Spanish films of 1992
