= Elio Pietrini =

Argentine-born Venezuelan actor (1939–2022)

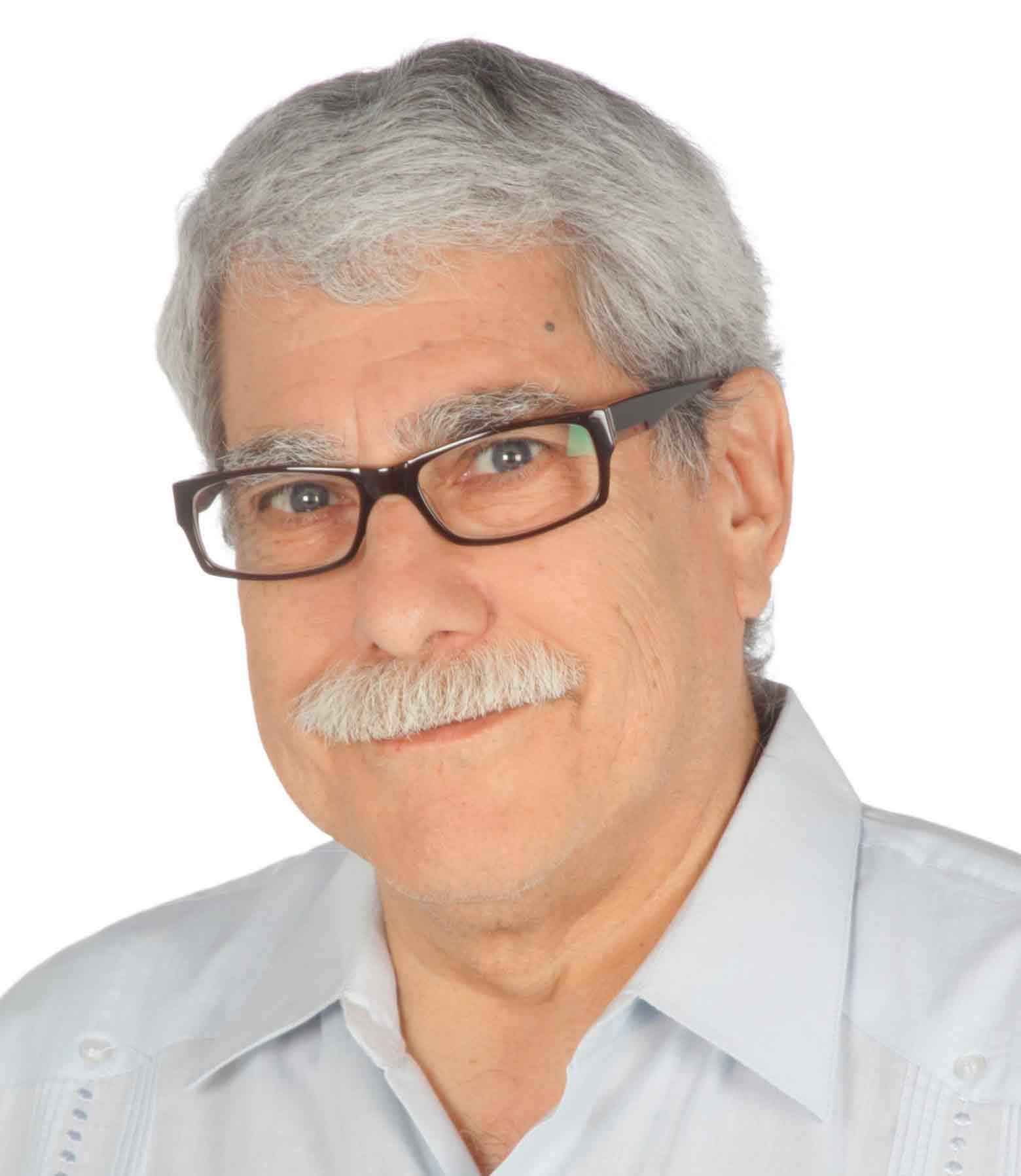
- Born: 2 January 1939; Buenos Aires, Argentina
- Died: 18 January 2022 (aged 83); Miami, Florida, U.S.
- Occupation: Actor

Elio Pietrini (2 January 1939 – 18 January 2022) was an Argentine-born Venezuelan actor, mainly active in telenovelas.

== Life and career ==
Born in Buenos Aires, Pietrini worked 12 years for the Venezuelan television channel RCTV, getting his breakout role in the early 1990s as Don Fulgenzio in the TV-series La pandilla de los 7. He later worked for numerous telenovelas and TV-movies, and after leaving RCTV he was put under contract by Venevisión, where he worked until his retirement.

Besides television, Pietrini was also active in theatre and cinema. His last work was the stage drama Una tarde en Saint Tropez, that he starred in between 2014 and 2015. Once retired, he moved to Miami, Florida, where he died from complications of COVID-19 on 18 January 2022, at the age of 83.

== Selected filmography ==
- Abigaíl (1988–1989)
- La pandilla de los 7 (1991–1992)
- Por estas calles (1992)
- Pura sangre (1994–1995)
- Ilusiones (1995)
- Amores de fin de siglo (1995)
- El perdón de los pecados (1996)
- Contra viento y marea (1997)
- Carita Pintada (1999)
- Mambo y canela (2002)
- Cosita rica (2003)
- La Invasora (2004)
- Los querendones (2006)
- Voltea pa' que te enamores (2006–2007)
- Amor Urbano (2009)
- La viuda joven (2011)
- El árbol de Gabriel (2011–2012)
- Nora (2014)
