= Maricarmen Regueiro =

Venezuelan actress

- Born: María del Carmen Regueiro Lorenzo; November 22, 1966 (age 59); Los Teques, Venezuela
- Other names: Maricarmen Regueiro; Mary Carmen Regueiro
- Occupation: Actress
- Years active: 1984-2001
- Spouse: Ramiro Helmeyer (m. 1996)
- Children: Nicolás Helmeyer Regueiro (b. 2002); Daniela Helmeyer Regueiro (b. 2003)

María del Carmen Regueiro Lorenzo (born November 22, 1966, in Los Teques, Venezuela) better known as Maricarmen Regueiro is a former Venezuelan actress. As of 2001, she is no longer a public figure.

== Biography ==
María del Carmen Regueiro Lorenzo was born on November 22, 1966, in Los Teques, Venezuela. She is the daughter of Spanish parents from Galicia, who came to Venezuela in search of a better future with the purpose of trying their luck in the jewelry business years ago. She has one sister and three brothers.

== Career ==
María del Carmen Regueiro began acting in Spanish language soap operas in 1986 when she participated in Cristal and the miniseries Mansion de Luxe alongside another famous Venezuelan actor, Carlos Mata. But she toiled as a secondary soap actress until 1988, when she starred in Señora alongside Carlos Mata, Flavio Caballero and Caridad Canelón. Señora became an instant hit all over Venezuela and other Latin American countries for producer RCTV and Regueiro became a super-star immediately. In Amanda Sabater alongside Flavio Caballero. In addition to working in Venezuelan and Peruvian productions, she has also worked in Argentina.

== Personal life ==
In 2002, she gave birth to the couple's first child, a boy, whom they called Nicolás Helmeyer Regueiro. In 2003, she gave birth to the couple's second child, a girl whom they called Daniela Helmeyer Regueiro. When her sister died in an accident, she took care of her nephews and assumed the role of an adoptive mother.

== Filmography ==
=== Television ===
Year	Title	Character	Channel
1984	Mami		
1985-1986	Cristal	Alicia	RCTV
1986	Mansión de Luxe	Nina Cerdese	RCTV
1986-1987	La intrusa	Rosa Hidalgo	RCTV
1987-1988	Mi amada Beatriz	Érika Monasterio Santaella	RCTV
1988-1989	Señora	Eugenia Montiel/María Eugenia Méndez	RCTV
1989	Amanda Sabater	Amanda Sabater	RCTV
1990-1991	Natacha	Natalia "Natacha" Guzmán Aguirre	Panamericana Televisión/RCTV
1991	Angustia	Selenia	RCTV
1991-1992	El desprecio	Clara Inés Santamaría/Clara Inés Albornoz	RCTV
1992-1993	Princesa	Daniela Lezama	Canal 9
1995	Amores de fin de siglo	Anastasia Montalbán Sandoval de Moncada	RCTV
1997-1998	Milady, la historia continúa	Pilar de Cassariego	Telefe
1998	Cosas del amor	Valeria Castro-Iglesias	Latina Televisión
2001	Carissima	Yermaní Vallemorín/Yermaní Burgos Urquia	RCTV
