= Carissima (TV series) =

- Genre: Telenovela; Romance; Drama
- Created by: Julio César Mármol
- Written by: Julio César Mármol; Julio César Mármol Jr. Manuel González U. Daniel González
- Directed by: Otto Rodríguez
- Starring: Roxana Díaz; Carlos Montilla; Maricarmen Regueiro; Franklin Virgüez; Carolina Tejera
- Opening theme: "Te Quise Olvidar" by MDO
- Country of origin: Venezuela
- Original language: Spanish
- No. of episodes: 103

Production
- Executive producer: Mariana Djuro Stürup
- Producer: Marco Godoy Ramírez
- Production location: Caracas
- Editor: Ray Suárez
- Production company: RCTV

Original release
- Network: RCTV
- Release: April 13 – August 20, 2001

Carissima is a Venezuelan telenovela written by Julio César Mármol and produced by RCTV in 2001. The telenovela lasted 103 episodes and was distributed internationally by RCTV International.

Roxana Díaz and Carlos Montilla starred as the main protagonists with Maricarmen Regueiro, Franklin Virgüez and Carolina Tejera as antagonists.

== Plot ==
Gabriel discovers his father has been murdered, and the suspected killer is Monserrat Vallemorín (alias Moncho), a powerful man in the underworld of organized crime, his family's enemy and the supposed godfather of Avril. Gabriel decides to take revenge for his father Ulises Santuario by focusing on Monserrat's two loves: Marbella, his foster daughter and Avril.

Avril is a young medical doctor struggling to find a job, but she refuses Monserrat's help as she suspects his illegal businesses. Monserrat takes an interest in Avril and tries to show her affection in every way possible, arousing the jealousy of Marbella who feels her foster father loves Avril more than her, and she decides to make Avril suffer. Unknown to Marbella, Avril is actually Monserrat's biological daughter from his past relationship with Thania Guzmán. Monserrat took Avril as a baby from Thania and gave her to Antonio Zurli, an Italian immigrant who fled the mafia and whom Monserrat helped to change identity and settle in Venezuela where he hired him as his gardener. Moncho hides Avril's true identity to prevent his enemies and his wife's family from harming her. On the other hand, Thania had another child with Moncho but hid the truth from him fearing he'd take her away. She gave the child, Adriana, to another family.

Under a false name, Gabriel integrates himself into the lives of Marbella and Avril as he plots his revenge, but he never expected to fall madly in love with Avril.

== Cast ==
- Roxana Díaz as Avril Zurli Gavazzeni
- Carlos Montilla as Gabriel Enrique Santuario Moro
- Maricarmen Regueiro as Yermaní Vallemorín / Yermaní Burgos Urquia
- Franklin Virgüez as Montserrat Vallemorín Martínez
- Carlos Cámara Jr. as Antonio Zurli
- Carolina Tejera as Marbella Vallemorín
- Carlos Márquez as Felipe Vallemorín
- Dalila Colombo as Esmeralda Aquino / Thania Guzmán
- Félix Loreto as Ulises Santuario Cedeña
- Chantal Baudaux as Adriana Libordo
- Gabriel Fernández as Tito Santuario
- Manuel Salazar as Domingo Libordo
- Francis Rueda as Esther Moro de Santuario
- Alberto Rowinski as Erasmo de la Franchesca
- Leopoldo Regnault as Dr. Gregorio Alemán
- Martín Lantigua as Álvaro Burgos Caicedo
- Verónica Ortíz as Valentina Ávila
- Estefanía López as Melani Santuario
- Jerónimo Gil as Héctor Coronel
- Reina Hinojosa as Messalina
- Verónica Cortéz as Tarcisia de Zurli
- Violeta Alemán as Martha Forero
- Enrique Izquierdo as Santiago Santuario
- Jeanette Flores as Marisol Santana
- Samuel González as Humberto "Kiko" Zurli
- Marianela González as Marni Zurli
- Sandy Olivares as Omar Santuario
- Magaly Serrano as Versuka Santuario
