= Amanda Sabater =

- Genre: Telenovela
- Created by: Ibsen Martínez and Salvador Garmendia
- Written by: Ibsen Martínez; Salvador Garmendia
- Directed by: Gabriel Walfenzao
- Starring: Maricarmen Regueiro; Flavio Caballero; Carlos Márquez; Carolina Lopez; Ernesto Balzi
- Opening theme: Como tempestad by Grupo Urbanda
- Country of origin: Venezuela
- Original language: Spanish
- No. of episodes: 167

Production
- Executive producer: Maria Auxiliadora Barrios
- Producer: Raul Licausi
- Production company: Radio Caracas Televisión

Original release
- Network: Radio Caracas Televisión
- Release: March 1 – September 11, 1989

Related
- La Doña (1972); Doménica Montero (1978); El desafío (1995)

Amanda Sabater is a Venezuelan telenovela written by Ibsen Martínez and Salvador Garmendia and produced by Radio Caracas Televisión in 1989. The telenovela is inspired by the Mexican version Doménica Montero written by Cuban writer Inés Rodena. This telenovela lasted 167 episodes and was distributed internationally by RCTV International.

Maricarmen Regueiro and Flavio Caballero starred as the main protagonists with Elisa Stella and Gabriel Fernández as the main antagonists.

== Synopsis ==
The beautiful city of Rio Grande belongs to the wealthy landowner Gregorio Sabater. His daughter, Amanda Sabater, is deeply in love with Arsenio Cuevas, and they are engaged to be married. Amanda knows only her father's "good side" and is unaware of his insidious activities. And her love for Arsenio has blinded her to the truth that her cousin Ana Belen is his lover. Ivan Moros, born in Rio Grande, left the city when he was a child. He returns and changes the lives of everyone. When Amanda meets Ivan she is strangely attracted to him, but only after a terrible turn of events does she come to know Ivan as her true love. In preparing for the wedding of Amanda and Arsenio, her father draws up a legal contract that waives Arsenio's rights to Amanda's wealth. Although Arsenio signs the document, he later abandons Amanda at the altar on their wedding day. Amanda is deeply hurt by Arsenio's rejection. She suffers an emotional breakdown and assumes a completely different personality. A series of shattering events and high passions shake the Sabater's city. Ivan Moros loves Amanda so much that he endures the scorn she feels for him - as he fights to win her love.

== Cast ==
- Maricarmen Regueiro as Amanda Sabater
- Flavio Caballero as Iván Moros
- Carolina Lopez as Ana Belén Sabater
- Carlos Márquez as Don Gregorio Sabater
- Pedro Lander as Comisario Armando Espinoza
- Elisa Stella as Doña Eva
- Gabriel Fernández as Julio Alejandro Sabater
- Helianta Cruz as Flor Mariño
- Marialejandra Martín as Isabel Padilla
- Abby Raymond as Gianina
- José Daniel Bort as Pierre
- Ernesto Balzi as Arsenio Cuevas
- Rosario Prieto as Morgana
- Francis Romero as Caridad
- Carolina Perpetuo as Wilma Mariño
- Karl Hoffman as Padre Gilberto
- Izar Figueroa as Chui
- Carlota Sosa as Cate
- Graciela Alterio as Débora
- Juan Frankis as Samudio
- Lourdes Valera as Betty
- Nancy Soto as Marcela
- Miguel Ángel Pérez as One Two
- Milena Santander as Graciela
- Vanessa as Carmen Luisa
- Jeanette Flores as Marcelita
- Marcos Campos as Quintana
- Alexander Montilla
- Kiko Mendive as Guanabacoa
- Jorge Canelón as Abel
- Ileana Alomá as Valentina
- Roberto Colmenares as Alejandro
- Lourdes Medrano as Natalia
- Luis Adolfo Lizarazo as Teo
