= Wayuu (disambiguation) =

Wayuu typically refers to the Wayuu people, an indigenous people of Colombia and Venezuela.

Other uses include:

- Wayuu language or Wayuunaiki, the Arawakan language spoken by Wayuu people
- Wayuu: La niña de Maracaibo, a 2012 Venezuelan crime film

== See also ==
- Wayuunaiki (newspaper), a bilingual monthly newspaper from Venezuela
- Wayu language, a Sino-Tibetan language of Nepal
- Wayu Tuka, a district in Ethiopia
