= El desprecio =

- Genre: Telenovela; Drama
- Created by: Julio César Mármol
- Written by: Julio César Mármol; Miriam Foti; Manuel González; Reinaldo Rodríguez; Morella Vega
- Directed by: Luis Manzo
- Starring: Maricarmen Regueiro; Flavio Caballero; Flor Nuñez; Carlos Márquez
- Theme music composer: Mario Corro
- Opening theme: ¿Por que Será? by Rudy La Scala
- Country of origin: Venezuela
- Original language: Spanish
- No. of episodes: 185

Production
- Executive producers: Jhonny Pulido; Carmen Cecilia Urbaneja
- Running time: 42-45 minutes

Original release
- Network: RCTV
- Release: November 11, 1991 – June 2, 1992

Related
- Caribe; Por estas calles; El desprecio

El desprecio (The Contempt) is a Venezuelan telenovela that was produced by and seen on Venezuela's Radio Caracas Televisión. It was written by Miriam Foti, Manuel González, Julio César Marmol, Reinaldo Rodríguez, and Morella Vega and directed by Luis Manzo. It was distributed internationally by RCTV International.

Maricarmen Regueiro and Flavio Caballero starred as the main protagonists with Flor Nuñez as the main antagonist.

A remake was made in 2006 with the same name titled El desprecio.

== Synopsis ==
El Desprecio is based on two distinct storylines. The first focuses on a young woman, her struggles, misfortunes, loneliness, loves, happiness, sadness and continuous search of personal dignity. The second vividly illustrates ambition for power and money. Both are played out by a parade of legendary characters whose actions reveal the extremities of devious plotting, intrigue and even murder.

The lead character Clara Ines Santamaria, an outcast who has unjustly been labeled "mentally retarded" because she stutters, lives a secluded life in the countryside in a hospice run by nuns. Society's grave misjudgment of Clara Ines will come to light and her profound intelligence will finally be discovered. Even though Clara Ines is actually a beautiful young woman, in the beginning she only inspires pity. She is from a wealthy family, but was raised by a nun who doesn't want her to know her true origins. One day, Clara Ines discovers the truth and sets off for the capital city to challenge her destiny. She meets Raul Velandro, a seemingly good man who immediately takes pity on her and extends his assistance. He tells her that he is a member of the family she is seeking, he sets a trap, and Clara Ines becomes involved in a series of circumstances that comprise the compelling plot of El Desprecio.

== Cast ==
- Flavio Caballero as Raúl Velandró
- Maricarmen Regueiro as Clara Inés Santamaría
- Carlos Márquez as Israel Santamaría
- Laura Brey as Corina Madrid de Velandró
- Dilia Waikarán as Elisenda Medina
- Ana Karina Manco as Tamara Campos
- Alberto Álvarez as Cirilo Santamaría
- Virgilio Galindo as Pereto
- Leopoldo Renault as Nicolás Santamaría
- Tomás Henriquez
- Sonya Smith as Violeta Velandró
- Ileana Jacket as Karen de Santamaría
