= Daniela Alvarado =

Venezuelan actress

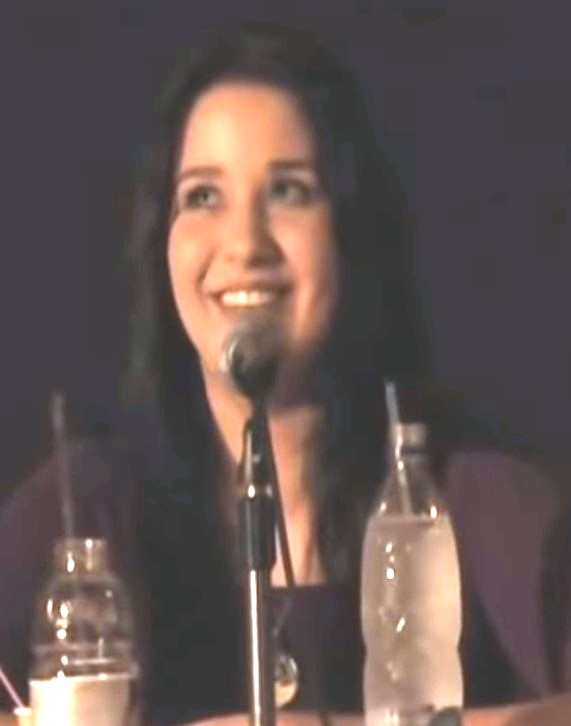
- Daniela Alvarado in 2008
- Born: Daniela del Carmen Alvarado Álvarez; October 23, 1981 (age 44); Caracas, Venezuela
- Occupation: Actress • theater
- Years active: 1987–present
- Spouse: José Manuel Suarez (m. 2021)

Daniela del Carmen Alvarado Álvarez (Spanish pronunciation: [daˈnjela alβaˈɾaðo]; born 23 October 1981 in Caracas) is a Venezuelan television, theatre and film actress. She is the daughter of actor Daniel Alvarado and actress Carmen Julia Álvarez and has 6 brothers.

She broke into international fame as the star of RCTV's telenovela Juana la virgen.

== Biography ==
Through the influence of her parents, Daniela ventured into the world of acting at the age of 4 in Macu, The Policeman's Woman. She later studied ballet and entered a children's dance group called Los Minipops. Since then, she has appeared in numerous telenovelas for RCTV and Venevisión.

== Filmography ==
Television
Year	Project	Role	Notes
1989	La Revancha	Gabriela Santana	Supporting Role
1991	La mujer prohibida	Marta "Martica" Gallardo Rivas	Supporting Role
1992	Divina obsesión	Paula	Supporting Role
1993	El paseo de la gracia de Dios	Sofía	Supporting Role
1995	Amores de fin de siglo	Gabriela Rossy Montalbán	Supporting Role
1996	La inolvidable	Virginia Calcaño	Supporting Role
1997	A todo corazón	Melissa Rodríguez	Main Role
1999	Mujercitas	Josefina "Jo" Bracho	Main Role
2000	Mariú	María Eugenia Sampedro "Mariú" / María Cristina Vicario	Main Role
2001	Angélica Pecado	Angélica Rodríguez	Main Role
2002	Juana la Virgen	Juana Pérez	Main Role
2003	La Invasora	Mariana del Carmen Guerra	Main Role
2005	Se solicita príncipe azul	María Corina Del Valle Palmieri	Main Role
2007	Voltea pa' que te enamores	Dileidy María López	Main Role
2009	Un esposo para Estela	Estela Margarita Morales	Main Role
2010	La mujer perfecta	Herself	Guest Role
2012	Mi ex me tiene ganas	Pilar "Lalo" La Roca	Main Role
2015	A puro corazón	Profesora	Guest Role

Film
Year	Project	Role
2004	Punto y Raya	Yosmar Coromoto
2006	Chao Cristina	Dulce Maria Acevedo
2007	13 segundos	Luisa
2007	Una abuela virgen	Antonieta García/ La Abuela Virgen
2009	Zamora	Encarnacion
2010	Taita Boves	Ines
2012	Azul y No Tan Rosa	Patricia
2013	Esclavo de Dios	Inés
2016	Solteras Indisponibles	
2022	Tarkari De Chivo	
2023	The Rent Girl	Valeria
2024	One way	

== Theater ==
- Doña Rosita (2025)
