= La pasión de Teresa =

- Genre: Telenovela; Romance; Drama
- Created by: Ibsen Martínez
- Written by: Ibsen Martínez; Alberto Barrera
- Directed by: Tito Rojas
- Starring: Astrid Carolina Herrera; Carlos Mata
- Opening theme: "Déjame intentar" by Carlos Mata
- Country of origin: Venezuela
- Original language: Spanish
- No. of episodes: 145

Production
- Executive producer: Jorge Gherardi
- Producer: Suzy Pérez
- Production locations: Miami, Florida, U.S.
- Editor: Alexis Montero
- Production company: RCTV

Original release
- Network: RCTV
- Release: March 11 – June 29, 1989

Related
- Abigail; Señora

La pasión de Teresa is a Venezuelan telenovela written by Ibsen Martínez and produced by RCTV in 1989. The telenovela lasted for 145 episodes and was distributed internationally by RCTV International.

Astrid Carolina Herrera and Carlos Mata starred as the protagonists.

== Plot ==
In a convent in Miami, Teresa is about to take her vows as a novice when she receives news of her father's death through murder. She begins to have doubts about her vocation and decides to leave the convent to take revenge on her father's murderer. Her efforts are frustrated by her step-mother Sabrina, but she ends up also discovering love in the form of two twin brothers who are the opposite of each other. Guillermo is there to support her always but also discovers through him, the underground mafia of the city. On the other hand, Alberto desires Teresa for her fortune and begins a game of taking his brother's place in order to be closer to Teresa.

== Cast ==
- Astrid Carolina Herrera as Teresa
- Carlos Mata as Alberto/Guillermo
- Hilda Abrahamz as Peggy San Juan
- Rosita Vásquez as Amanda
- Ana Karina Manco as Érika
- Carlos Cámara Jr. as Arístides Vargas
- Rebeca Alemán
- José Oliva as Alberto
- Mimí Lazo as Sabrina Carvajal
- Elisa Parejo as Azalea
- Humberto Tancredi as Arias
- Reina Hinojosa as Celeste
- Gledys Ibarra as Dolores
- Guillermo Ferrán
- Irina Rodríguez -Mónica
- Carlota Sosa as Franca Velasco
- Lupe Gehrenbeck
- Dante Carlé as Diego López
- Pedro Durán as Fabricio
- Carmen Arencibia
- Manuel Gassol
- Verónica Doza
- Ernesto Mérida
- Ana María Paredes
- Yajaira Paredes
- Zulay García
- Olga Rojas
