= De oro puro =

- Genre: Telenovela; Drama
- Created by: Julio César Mármol
- Directed by: Rafael Suárez
- Starring: Hylene Rodríguez; Mauricio Rentería; Flor Núñez
- Opening theme: Corazón moro by Colina
- Country of origin: Venezuela
- Original language: Spanish
- No. of episodes: 113

Production
- Producer: Jhonny Pulido Mora
- Production company: RCTV

Original release
- Network: RCTV
- Release: August 23, 1994 – January 24, 1995

Related
- Por estas calles; Amores de fin de siglo

De Oro Puro (English title: Of Pure Gold) is a Venezuelan telenovela written by Julio César Mármol and produced by Radio Caracas Televisión in 1994. The telenovela lasted for 113 episodes. Hylene Rodríguez and Mauricio Rentería starred as the main protagonists.

== Cast ==
- Hylene Rodriguez as Mariana Brekenheimer
- Mauricio Renteria as Marum Soulez Gruber
- Jose Daniel Bort as Milton Soulez Gruber
- Dad Dager as Rovenna
- Dora Mazzone as Virginia Cusiel
- Alexander Milic as Ianco Klopenberger
- Flor Nuñez as Auriselvia Luzardo
- Jorge Palacios as Erasmo Soulez Delfin
- Francis Romero as Cecilia Azocar
- Vicente Tepedino as Alcides Alfieri
- Mariam Valero as Winnifer Lozano
