= Señora (TV series) =

- Genre: Telenovela; Romance; Drama
- Created by: José Ignacio Cabrujas
- Written by: José Ignacio Cabrujas; Ibsen Martínez; Cristina Policastro; Eliseo Morales
- Directed by: Luis Alberto Lamata; Aura Guevara
- Starring: Caridad Canelón; Maricarmen Regueiro; Carlos Mata
- Opening theme: Di Que Tu performed by Carlos Mata
- Ending theme: Di Que Tu performed by Carlos Mata
- Country of origin: Venezuela
- Original language: Spanish
- No. of episodes: 229

Production
- Executive producer: María Auxiliadora Barrios
- Producer: Henry Marquez
- Production company: RCTV

Original release
- Network: RCTV
- Release: November 10, 1988 – September 26, 1989

Related
- La pasión de Teresa; Toda una dama (2007)

Señora is a 1988 Venezuelan telenovela written by José Ignacio Cabrujas and produced by Radio Caracas Televisión. The telenovela lasted 229 episodes and was distributed internationally by RCTV International.

Maricarmen Regueiro and Carlos Mata starred as the main protagonists with Caridad Canelón as the main antagonist.

== Synopsis ==
Young, mischievous and rebellious, Eugenia has been sentenced to five years in prison for a minor offense. She knows that District Attorney Diego Mendoza is responsible for the unusually harsh sentence and she vows to get revenge. A few years later, upon her release, Eugenia's only family is the woman who raised her. But the woman dies a few days later, leaving only a woman's name on a piece of paper and a message saying it was the truth of her past. Later, a terrible accident brings Eugenia face to face with the man who put her in jail. Fleeing the police, Eugenia goes to work for a domineering woman who blackmails her, but who has a powerful influence on her life. In this new world, Eugenia meets a man who falls in love with her and worships her, but Eugenia has no time for love. She is obsessed with her passion for vengeance against the man who ruined her life. Eugenia cannot know that fate, in all its irony, has prepared a trap for her.

== Cast ==
- Caridad Canelón as Constitucion Méndez
- Maricarmen Regueiro as Eugenia Montiel
- Carlos Mata as Diego Mendoza
- Flavio Caballero as Anselmo Itriago
- Amalia Perez Diaz as Endrina Montoya
- Maria Teresa Acosta as Candida Montoya
- Marisela Berti as Candela Benitez
- Cristina Reyes as Pilar Lujan de Mendoza
- Jaime Araque as Alvaro
- Charles Barry as Padre Peralta
- Umberto Buonocuore as Jacinto Perdomo
- Pedro Durán as Ildelmaro Torres
- Carolina López as Silvina
- Marlene Maceda as Debora Luján
- Pedro Marthan as Isaias Luján
- Marialejandra Martín as Irina Perdomo
- Ignacio Navarro as Eleazar Rangel
- Irma Palmieri as Helena
- Arquimedes Rivero as Juez Pantoja
- Hylene Rodríguez as Jimena Itriago
- Victoria Roberts as Altagracia Perdomo
- Elisa Stella as Eloisa
- Lourdes Valera as Zoraida
- Carlos Villamizar as Aquiles Mendoza
- Virginia Urdaneta as Mercedes
- Carlos Flores as López
- Fran Moreno as Efrain Martinez
- Carlos Cámara Jr. as Kennedy
- Jose Daniel Bort as Humberto
- Ricardo Hernández as Manuel
