= Elizabeth (TV series) =

- Genre: Telenovela
- Created by: Pilar Romero; José Simón Escalona
- Directed by: César Bolívar; Clemente de la Cerda
- Starring: Caridad Canelón; Orlando Urdaneta
- Opening theme: Ayúdala by Mari Trini
- Country of origin: Venezuela
- Original language: Spanish
- No. of episodes: 67

Production
- Producer: Arnaldo Limansky
- Production company: RCTV

Original release
- Network: RCTV
- Release: February 19 – May 19, 1981

Related
- Luisana mia; Mi prima Ciela

Elizabeth is a Venezuelan telenovela written by Pilar Romero and produced by Radio Caracas Televisión in 1981. This telenovela lasted 67 episodes and was distributed internationally by Coral International. The main theme for the telenovela was Ayúdala performed by Mari Trini.

Caridad Canelón and Orlando Urdaneta starred as the main protagonists.

== Synopsis ==
During a school event, Elizabeth and her cousin who is also her best friend Lourdes flee in fear after chaos erupts, and both of them suffer from identical dizziness. Juan David, a journalist covering the event, takes them home. Although he has a girlfriend, Juan David becomes interested in Elizabeth. The two cousins continue suffering from dizziness until Lourdes discovers she is pregnant from a man she knows her mother would ever accept, and so she decides to get an abortion. But in Elizabeth's case, she is diagnosed with a fatal disease:leukemia, and her only hope becomes a bone marrow transfer from a close relative.

It is through this situation that Elizabeth's parents confirm that she is adopted, and they begin the frantic search for her biological mother Graciela who was forced to give her up. Graciela who is now a famous journalist donates her bone marrow, but the transplant fails. She is forced to look for Elizabeth's biological father, a scoundrel who only agrees to do the surgery in exchange for money. Meanwhile, Lourdes convinces her mother to accept her marriage to the father of her baby.

Finally cured, Elizabeth marries Juan David. But a pregnancy places her life in danger. In the end she dies after giving birth to a daughter. Juan David raises his daughter while lovingly remembering his beloved Elizabeth.

== Cast ==
- Caridad Canelón as Elizabeth
- Orlando Urdaneta as Juan David
- Grecia Colmenares as Lourdes
- Carmen Julia Alvarez as Graciela
- Hilda Vera as Jimena
- Javier Vidal as José Antonio
- Yanis Chimaras as Aníbal
- Laura Brey as Melania

== Remake ==
In 2007, RCTV remade the telenovela Elizabeth under a new title Mi prima Ciela starring Mónica Spear and Manuel Sosa.
