= Franklin Virgüez =

Venezuelan actor (born 1953)

Franklin José Virgüez Dun (born October 1, 1953 in Barquisimeto) is a Venezuelan actor.

His comic roles are very popular. He lives in Miami.

== Filmography ==
=== Films ===
Year	Title	Role	Notes
1982	Cangrejo	El chino cano	
1982	Domingo de resurrección	Franklin Edgardo Salazar	
1983	La casa de agua	Cruz Elías Salmerón Acosta	
1983	Homicidio culposo		
1984	Retén de Catia		
1986	Asesino nocturno		
1986	Pirañas de puerto		
1991	Cuerpos clandestinos	Gabriel	Television film
1992	En territorio extranjero		
2008	Mea Culpa	Mario	
2015	La Tumba		Short film
2023	Simón		Awarded as Best Supporting Actor at the Venezuelan Film Festival for the role

=== Television ===
Year	Title	Role	Notes
1977	Rafaela		
1977	La Zulianita	David	
1978	María del Mar	Sargento	
1979	Emilia	Tano	
1980	Buenos días, Isabel	Marcelo	
1982	La goajirita		
1983	Leonela	Damian Cedeño	
1984	Marisela	Álvaro	
1985	Rebeca		
1985	Adriana		
1987	La intrusa	Manuel Landaeta	
1988	Selva Maria	Rodrigo	Lead role
1989	Pobre negro	Negro Malo / Pedro Miguel Candelas	Lead role
1992	Por estás calles	Eudormar Santos	
1992	Eva Marina		
1995	Amores de fin de siglo	Ezequiel Camacho	
1996	Los amores de Anita Peña		
1997	María de los Ángeles	Radamés Basanta	
1998	Aunque me cueste la vida	Teofilo Larrazábal	
2000	Hay amores que matan	Fredimático González	
2001	Carissima	Montserrat Vallemorín	
2003	Cosita rica	Nicomedes Luján	Co-lead role
2004	Ángel rebelde	Alejandro "Alejo" Espejo	
2005	Se solicita príncipe azul	Ángel Rivas	
2006	Mi vida eres tú	Jorge Flores	11 episodes
2006	Voltea pa' que te enamores	Gabriel Márquez	
2008	Amor comprado	Saladino Yabor	
2009	Alma indomable	Danilo Ocampo	
2010	Salvador de mujeres	Don Carlos	
2010	Eva Luna	El Gallo	Episode: "Gran Final"
2011-2012	Natalia del Mar	Baldomero Sánchez	
2013	Rosario	Vicente	
2014	Cosita linda	Darío Núñez	
2015–2016	El Señor de los Cielos	General Diosdado Carreño Arias	
2017	La doble vida de Estela Carrillo	El Talisman	
