= Gustavo Rodríguez (actor) =

Venezuelan actor (1947–2014)

- Born: Gustavo Álvaro Rodríguez; February 19, 1947; Ciudad Bolívar, Bolívar, Venezuela
- Died: April 2, 2014 (aged 67); Caracas, Venezuela
- Occupation: Actor
- Years active: 1973–2013
- Employers: RCTV; Venevisión

Gustavo Rodríguez (February 19, 1947 – April 2, 2014) was a Venezuelan film, stage and television actor.

== Early life ==
Gustavo Rodríguez was born in Ciudad Bolívar, the capital city of Venezuela's southeastern Bolívar state.

Rodríguez initially became an avid film fan in his childhood days, as he often explained that Orson Welles' classic Citizen Kane (1941) made an especially strong impression on him as a young man.

== Career ==
In a career that spanned more than 40 years, Rodríguez was able to play the most dissimilar of characters, from royalist caudillo José Tomás Boves, tango singer Carlos Gardel, philosopher Karl Marx, and Venezuelan president Rómulo Betancourt, to the lead role in William Shakespeare's Hamlet and King Lear, while appearing in over more than 50 playwrights, 40 telenovelas and 18 films.

Following college graduation, Rodríguez moved to Caracas to attend Central University of Venezuela, where he acted in school plays before obtaining a Bachelor of Arts degree. He was discovered by playwright and filmmaker Román Chalbaud at a drama camp. Chalbaud later cast him in his 1974 production Boves, el urogallo, a Radio Caracas Television drama starring Rodríguez and based on the novel of the same name by Francisco Herrera Luque.

In 1979 Rodríguez gained prominence in Estefanía, where he played the role of disgusting villain Pedro Escobar; a fictional character based on Pedro Estrada, notorious symbol of human rights abuse in Venezuela during the government of Marcos Pérez Jiménez. In the real life, Estrada was extremely repressive against critics of the regime and ruthlessly hunted down and imprisoned those who opposed the dictatorship.

While at RCTV, Rodríguez was often cast in romantic dramas with characters in conflict while dealing with moral dilemmas, painful resolutions, and strained familial situations. He later joined Venevisión and also was very active in theater and films, showing his skills and great performances in any role he played.

Among the many TV shows he did guest spots on are Pecado de Amor, La mujer perfecta and El País de las mujeres. His last TV appearance became in 2013 in De todas maneras Rosa, where he portrayed Anselmo 'Macho' Vergara, a jerk, cynical character by his way of relating to human beings.

== Death ==
Rodríguez was diagnosed with lung cancer in January 2014 and it was inoperable. He died on April 2 in Caracas at the age of 67. According to his last desire, he was cremated and his ashes scattered over the Orinoco River in his native Bolívar.

== Selected works ==
=== Filmography ===
- Sagrado y obsceno (1975)
- Death at Dawn (1977)
- Domingo de resurrección (1982)
- Adiós Miami (1984)
- Captain Ron (1992)
- Borrón y cuenta nueva (2000)
- El Sr. Presidente (2007)

=== Television ===
- Estefanía (1979)
- Natalia de 8 a 9 (1980)
- Cruz de nadie (1994)
- Pecado de Amor (1995)
- Contra viento y marea (1997)
- El País de las mujeres (1998)
- Samantha (1998)
- Estrambótica Anastasia (2004)
- Mi prima Ciela (2007)
- La mujer perfecta (2010)
- La vida entera (2010)
- Mi ex me tiene ganas (2012)
- De todas maneras Rosa (2013)
