= Carmen Julia Álvarez =

Venezuelan actress (born 1952)

Carmen Julia Álvarez (born November 4, 1952, in Caracas) is a Venezuelan actress. She was married to actors Eduardo Serrano from 1968 to 1975 and Daniel Alvarado from 1978 to 1994. She has two children with Daniel, daughter Daniela and son Carlos Daniel.

== Filmography ==
=== Telenovelas ===
- Para verte mejor (2017)
- Amor Secreto (2014) as Trinidad Vielma
- Tomasa Tequiero (2010)
- El amor las vuelve locas (2005)
- La Invasora (2003)
- Angelica pecado (2000)
- Toda Mujer (1999)
- Así es la vida (1998)
- Destino de mujer (1997)
- Ilusiones (1995)
- El paseo de la gracia de Dios (1993)
- Divina obsesión (1992)
- La mujer prohibida (1991)
- La Revancha (1989)
- La Intrusa (1987)
- Claudia (1982)
- Elizabeth (1980)
- Estefanía (1979)
- Gabriela (1977)
- Canaima (1976)
- La Cruz De La Montaña (1975)
- Un Demonio Con Ángel (1974)
- Crucificada (1974)
- Ojo Por Ojo (1974)
- Tuya Para Siempre (1974) (Jorge Félix - Male Protagonist)
- Aquella Mujer (1973)
- Simplemente Maria (1970)
- Mariana Montiel (1969)
- El Mulato (1968)
- La Tirana (1965)

=== Movies ===
- 13 segundos (2007)
- El Compromiso (1988)
- El Secreto / The Secret (1988)
- Domingo de resurrección (1982)
- Camino de la verdad / El Siervo de Dios (1968)
- El Pequeño milagro (1964)
