= Belén Rodríguez (journalist) =

Spanish television personality

- Born: Belén Marta Rodríguez Gómez; 23 March 1966 (age 58); Madrid, Spain
- Occupation: Journalist
- Years active: 1998 – present

Belén Marta Rodríguez Gómez (born March 23, 1966), better known as Belén Rodríguez or simply Belén Ro, is a Spanish journalist and television collaborator who has been part of more than fifteen television programs dedicated to the tabloids.

== Biography ==
Born into a family of journalists, she is the daughter of Pedro Rodríguez and Chari Gómez Miranda (popularly known on television as "Doña Adelaida") and the sister of journalist Pedro Rodrguez Gómez.

Her specialization is the tabloids and reality shows. Her career in television began in the nineties, in TVE, behind the cameras of María Teresa Campos' programs. Her first time in front of the cameras was in the program Día a Día, in Telecinco, where she acted as a collaborator. Soon after, she begins to participate in the Gran Hermano, debates, where she remained until the contest's conclusion in 2017. In 2003, the journalist changed channels and began to collaborate with Antena 3, in the program Sabor a Ti, presented by Ana Rosa Quintana.

From 2005 to 2015, she worked on Telecinco's El programa de Ana Rosa, which she co–hosted with La Noria since 2008 until its cancellation in 2012. Later, she appeared on Telecinco in Enemigos íntimos, ¡Qué tiempo tan feliz! and Viva la vida. She has also participated as a contestant in the contest ¡Mira quién salta! presented by Jesús Vázquez on Telecinco.

She collaborates in Sálvame from 2012 to 2014, and she returns in 2016. leaves the program again in 2019 after her harsh confrontations with Antonio David Flores. Since then, she has participated in Ya es mediodía, La casa fuerte and Mujeres y hombres y viceversa. She returns as a collaborator to Sábado Deluxe in 2021.

== Trajectory ==
Year	Title	Channel	Role
1998–2003	Día a Día	Telecinco	Collaborator
2003–2004	Sabor a ti	Antena 3	Collaborator
2004–2017	Gran Hermano: El Debate	Telecinco	Collaborator
2005–2015	El programa de Ana Rosa	Telecinco	Collaborator
2007	La casa de tu vida	Telecinco	Collaborator
2010	Enemigos íntimos	Telecinco	Collaborator
2012–2015	¡Qué tiempo tan feliz!	Telecinco	Collaborator
2012–2014 2016-2019; 2022-present	Sálvame	Telecinco	Collaborator
2013	Campamento de verano	Telecinco	Collaborator
2014	¡Mira quién salta!	Telecinco	Contestant
2015	Pasaporte a la isla	Telecinco	Collaborator
2016–2019 2021–present	Deluxe	Telecinco	Collaborator
2017–2018	Viva la vida	Telecinco	Collaborator
2019	Sálvame Okupa	Telecinco	Contestant (4th finalist)
2020–2021	Supervivientes: Conexión Honduras	Telecinco	Collaborator
2020	La casa fuerte	Telecinco	Collaborator
2020–2021	Ya es mediodía	Telecinco	Collaborator
2021	Mujeres y hombres y viceversa	Cuatro	Opinionist
2021	Rocío, contar la verdad para seguir viva	Telecinco	Collaborator
2021	La última cena	Telecinco	Guest
2022	Montealto: Regreso a la casa	Telecinco	Collaborator
