= Chari Gómez Miranda =

Spanish journalist and TV presenter (1930–2011)

- Born: Rosario Gómez Miranda; 1930; Spain
- Died: 22 February 2011 (aged 80); Madrid, Spain
- Other name: Doña Adelaida
- Occupations: Journalist, television presenter
- Spouse: Pedro Rodríguez García
- Children: Belén Rodríguez; Pedro Rodríguez Gómez; Javier Rodríguez Gómez; Fernando Rodríguez Gómez
- Awards: Andalucía Journalism Award

Rosario Gómez Miranda (1930 – 22 February 2011), known as Chari Gómez Miranda, was a Spanish journalist and television presenter famous for her character "Doña Adelaida".

== Biography ==
Chari Gómez Miranda's career began in radio. In 1978, she participated in the program A ciento veinte that was presented every Saturday morning by Eduardo Sotillos on Radio Nacional de España.

Her popularity came with television, in 1990, when she was signed by Jesús Hermida to make a brief summary and commentary about the Venezuelan telenovela Cristal, which was broadcast daily on the show A mi manera. Under the pseudonym of "Doña Adelaida" and with ease and self-confidence before the cameras, Gómez Miranda won the sympathies of the public by embodying a character who professed to make an endearing semblance of the archetype of maruja, or housewife.

After the end of Cristal and the Hermida program, "Doña Adelaida" continued presenting other telenovelas on Televisión Española.

Except for a brief interval, in which Gómez Miranda presented the youth show Vaya fauna (1992) on Antena 3, her later career was closely linked to María Teresa Campos, with whom she worked on the Telecinco show Día a día, until its cancellation in 2004. She also made a venture into theater and in 1998 took part in the play Dos mujeres a las nueve by Juan Ignacio Luca de Tena.

Widowed in 1984 by journalist Pedro Rodríguez (1935–1984), she was the mother of television presenter Belén Rodríguez and Pedro Rodríguez Gómez, general director of Cuarzo Producciones.

From 1996 to 1999, she appeared in the series El súper. Historias de todos los días on Telecinco, playing the role of "Doña Úrsula", the kleptomaniac customer and gossip of the supermarket.

In 2001, she received the Andalucía Journalism Award for her television work.

Chari Gómez Miranda died in Madrid on 22 February 2011 after a long illness.
