= The Rent Girl =

- Theatrical release poster
- Directed by: Carlos Caridad Montero
- Written by: Fernando Martínez; Daniel Alfonso Rojas
- Produced by: Agustín Segnini
- Starring: Daniela Alvarado; Luis Olavarrieta; Patricia Schwarzgruber; Agustín Segnini
- Cinematography: Sergio Castillo
- Edited by: Carlos Caridad-Montero
- Production companies: Somos Films; Ananás Producciones
- Release date: June 1, 2023
- Running time: 90 minutes
- Country: Venezuela
- Language: Spanish

The Rent Girl (Spanish: La chica del alquiler) is a 2023 Venezuelan romantic comedy film directed and edited by Carlos Caridad Montero and written by Fernando Martínez & Daniel Alfonso Rojas. Starring Daniela Alvarado, Luis Olavarrieta, Patricia Schwarzgruber and Agustín Segnini. It premiered on June 1, 2023, in Venezuelan theaters.

== Synopsis ==
After Lorena, the woman he believed to be the love of his life, leaves him at the altar, Sebastián can't think of a better idea than to look for her at the beach house they rented for their honeymoon. There he crosses his path, Valeria, the rent girl, who is determined to cure his spite, break his rigid patterns and turn him into a new Sebastian until the runaway bride appears on the beach with Tomas, the best man at the wedding.

== Cast ==
The actors participating in this film are:

- Daniela Alvarado as Valeria
- Luis Olavarrieta as Tomas
- Patricia Schwarzgruber as Lorena
- Agustín Segnini as Sebastián
- Augusto Nitti as Anzuelo
- César Bencid as priest

== Production ==
Principal photography lasted 4 weeks starting in August 2022 in Los Caracas, Caruao, La Sabana and Urama, from La Guaira.
