= Estefanía =

- Created by: Julio César Mármol
- Written by: Humberto Olivieri; Isamar Hernández; Edgar Mejías; Alicia Barrios; José Ignacio Cabrujas
- Directed by: César Bolívar
- Starring: Pierina España; José Luis Rodríguez; Gustavo Rodríguez; Carlos Olivier
- Opening theme: "The Rite of Spring" by Igor Stravinsky
- Country of origin: Venezuela
- Original language: Spanish
- No. of episodes: 208

Production
- Executive producer: César Bolívar
- Production location: Caracas

Original release
- Network: RCTV
- Release: July 1, 1979 – January 28, 1980

Estefanía is a Venezuelan telenovela that was produced by and broadcast on Venezuela's Radio Caracas Televisión in 1979. The story idea was conceived by Julio César Marmol and Humberto (Kiko) Olivieri and the plot was based on the government of Marcos Pérez Jiménez. Pierina España and José Luis Rodríguez starred as the main protagonists with Gustavo Rodríguez as the main antagonist. The telenovela was written by and Julio César Marmol, and directed by César Bolívar and Julio César Marmol, the series lasted 208 episodes. It was distributed internationally by Coral International.

== Synopsis ==
In 1957, Venezuela is under a harsh military regime. Estefanía Gallardo is a famous actress who is fighting to save her father who is in jail as a political prisoner in the hands of the ruthless National Security Command led by the bloodthirsty Pedro Escobar. Luis Alberto Seijas is engaged to Ana Maria Escobar, Pedro's daughter. One time, Estefanía helps Luis Alberto escape and there is an instant attraction between them. However, Estefanía is hesitant on pursuing the relationship further due to Luis Alberto's closeness to the regime. What she doesn't know is that he is the leader of the leader of the struggle against the dictatorship going by the alias "El Guácharo".

Estefanía becomes a victim of blackmail of Pedro who desires her to marry him for her father's release from prison. Luis Alberto is heartbroken thinking she is involved with Pedro. Being chased by the authorities, Luis Alberto escapes to Spain. Julio César, a journalist working at the Palacio de Miraflores meets her and they fall in love and marry. He has now become the new "El Guácharo". Pedro decides to kill Julio César to get Estefanía back. Finally the dictatorship falls and the whole country is happy, with the evil doers getting punished.

The story follows a romantic relationship set against the backdrop of a dictatorship, political repression, imprisonment, torture, and conspiracy. Estefanía is an internationally known actress whose brother is wealthy. As the government falls, the characters face the consequences of their actions.

== Cast ==
- Pierina España as Estefanía Gallardo
- José Luis Rodríguez as Luis Alberto Seijas "El Guácharo"
- Gustavo Rodríguez as Pedro Escobar
- Carlos Olivier as Julio César Ordóñez
- Tomás Henríquez as Manuel Fulvio Lanz
- Grecia Colmenares as Ana Maria Escobar
- Arturo Calderón as Jose Francisco Gallardo
- Mahuampi Acosta as Mama Rosa
- Agustina Martín as Doña Petra Martínez de Seijas
- Amalia Pérez Díaz as Rosalia
- Henry Zakka as Gabo Seijas
- Patricia Noguera as Chepina
- Luis Rivas as Perez Jimenez
- María Conchita Alonso as Silvana Cataldo
- Alan Garcia Perez as "el mudito"
- Nury Flores

== See also ==
- List of famous telenovelas
