= Daniel Alvarado =

Venezuelan actor (1949–2020)

- Born: 12 August 1949; Maracaibo, Zulia, Venezuela
- Died: 8 July 2020 (aged 70); Caracas, Venezuela
- Occupation: Actor
- Years active: 1973–2014
- Spouses: Carmen Julia Álvarez (m. 1978–1994) Emma Rabbe (m. 1998–2015)
- Children: 7

Daniel Alvarado (12 August 1949 – 8 July 2020) was a Venezuelan actor.

== Personal life ==
He was married three times. He had two sons, Daniel and Luis, from his first marriage. From second marriage with Carmen Julia Álvarez (1978–1994), he had a daughter Daniela and son Carlos Daniel. From his third marriage with Emma Rabbe (1998–2020), he had three sons, Daniel Alejandro, Diego José and Calvin Daniel.

She worked on the dramatic productions Alba Marina, La revancha, Peligrosa, Pecado de amor, El perdón de los pecados, Toda mujer, Guerra de mujeres, Mambo y Canela, and Mi gorda bella. Her last role was in the telenovela La virgen de la calle in 2014. She also starred in several Venezuelan films, such as Macu: la mujer del policía and Desnudo con naranjas, and appeared in De mujer a mujer, El secreto, Disparen a matar, Sangrador, and Río negro.

Alvarado died at the age of 70 on 8 July 2020 after falling from steps in his home and hitting his head. His death was announced the same day on social media by Daniela.

== Filmography ==
=== Film ===
- Los Padrinos (1973)
- Cangrejo II (1984)
- Una noche oriental (1986) - Pirela
- La matanza de Santa Bárbara (1986)
- De mujer a mujer (From Woman to Woman) (1987) - Eloy, the husband
- Macu, la mujer del policía (Macu, the Policeman's Woman) (1987) - Ismaelito
- Eroi dell'inferno (Hell's Heroes) (1987) - Major Deng
- Con el corazón en la mano (1988) - Gato
- El Secreto (The Secret) (1988) - Comandante Durán León
- El Compromiso (1988) - Vecino Gay
- L'Aventure extraordinaire d'un papa peu ordinaire (Extraordinary Adventure of an Ordinary Papa) (1989) - Le général
- Cuerpos perdidos (Corps perdus) (1989)
- Disparen a matar (Shoot to Kill) (1990) - Castro Gil
- Río Negro (Black River) (1991) - Ricardo Osuña
- De amor y de sombras (Of Love and Shadows) (1994) - Freedom Fighter
- Desnudo con naranjas (Naked with Oranges) (1996) - Capitain
- Macbeth-Sangrador (Bleeder) (2000) - Max (Maximiliano)
- Antigua vida mía (Antigua, My Life) (2001) - Comentarista Radio #1
- Wayuu: La niña de Maracaibo (Wayuu: the girl from Maracaibo) (2011) - Gamero / Francisco
- Hijos De La Tierra( TBA)

=== TV series ===
- La Fiera (1978) - Dimas
- La Fruta Amarga (1981) - Tanislo
- La Mujer Sin Rostro (1984) - Padre Ezequiel
- La Dueña (1984) - Capt. Mauricio Lofriego
- Doña Perfecta (1985)
- Alba Marina (1988) - Nelson Hurtado
- La Revancha (1989) - Reinaldo
- Bellisima (1991) - Arturo
- Rosangelica (1993) - Joel Cruz
- Peligrosa (1994) - Gavilán
- Morelia (1995)
- Pecado de Amor (1996) - Isaías Peña
- El Perdon de los Pecados (1996) - Calixto Martínez
- Samantha (1998) - Arcadio 'Maute' Guanipa
- Toda Mujer (1999) - Néstor Cordido
- Amantes de Luna Llena (2000-2001) - Antonio Calcaño (Tony)
- Guerra de Mujeres (2001) - Juan Manuel Boni
- Mambo y Canela (2002) - Kiko León 'Magallanes'
- Mi Gorda Bella (2002) - José Manuel Sevilla
- Cosita Rica (El Barrio República) (2003)
- Amor Real (2003) - Lisandro Fonseca
- Mujer con pantalones (2006) - Pedro Pablo Torrealba
- Por Todo lo Alto (2006) - Bienvenido Alegría
- Mi Prima Ciela (2007) - Alberto Zambrano
- Calle luna, Calle sol (2009) - Juan José Pérez
- Dulce Amargo (2012) - Benito Montilla
- La Virgen de la Calle (2014) - Ernesto Molina (final appearance)

=== Mini-series ===
- ADDA (1990)
