= Irma Palmieri =

Venezuelan actress

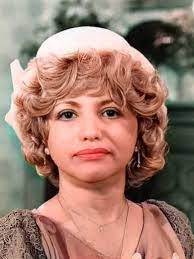
- Born: 30 December 1932; Puerto Cabello, Carabobo, Venezuela
- Died: 19 March 2015 (aged 83); Caracas, Venezuela
- Other name: Hortensia
- Occupations: Actress, comedian
- Years active: 1961-1999

Irma Palmieri (30 December 1932 – 19 March 2015) was a Venezuelan actress and comedian, known primarily for her work as Hortensia Robledo on the "Flora & Hortensia" radio sketches.

== Career ==
Her career began on the radio, where she garnered fame with her comedic voice work on Radio Rumbos. The character of Pepito Preguntón was created for her by Pedro E. Belisario. She later became nationally famous for the elderly spinster character of Hortensia, who lived with her friend Flora (Nelly Pujols). Sketches featuring the two characters were broadcast as part of the comedy series Kiko Botones on Radio Rochela during the 1980s.

== Death ==
Palmieri died at age 83 on 19 March 2015, at a local hospital in Caracas. The cause of death was surgery complications from a brain tumour.

== Filmography ==
Television
Year	Title	Role	Notes
1975	Valentina	Hermana Melania	Television debut
1981	Kiko Botones	Elena Nita	
1986	La dama de rosa		
1988	Señora	Helena	
