= Domingo de Resurrección =

- Directed by: César Bolívar
- Starring: Juan Manuel Laguardia; Carmen Julia Álvarez; Franklin Virgüez; Flavio Caballero; Adela Cisneros
- Release date: 1982
- Running time: 90 minute
- Country: Venezuela
- Language: Spanish

Domingo de Resurrección (lit. 'Resurrection Sunday') is a 1982 Venezuelan comedy film directed by César Bolívar.

== Plot ==
A middle-class family of six people: León Camacho, his wife Alicia, Mrs. Felicia (Alicia's mother), María Alejandra (the Camacho's daughter) and two of her friends; go to the beach to spend Holy Week. On Easter Sunday evening, Doña Felicia dies peacefully in her sleep, setting off a series of tragic and comic misadventures that lead up to the theft of the vehicle in which the Camacho family travels (a Volkswagen Brasília), in whose grill lies the body of the deceased Mrs. Felicia.

The plot is set in the town of Todasana, in the then Vargas state of the Federal District.

== Cast ==
- Juan Manuel Laguardia ("Full Chola") ... León Camacho
- Carmen Julia Álvarez ... Alicia de Camacho
- Adela Cisneros ... Mrs. Felicia
- Nayth Albert ... María Alejandra Camacho
- Naldry Albert ... Roraima
- José Daniel Alvarado ... Juan Carlos
- Arturo Calderón ... Angulo
- Soraya Sanz ... Rosalía
- Aníbal Salazar ... Cheché
- Franklin Virgüez ... Franklin Edgardo Salazar, F.E.S.
- Yajaira Paredes ... Blanca
- Nestor Maldonado ... Argenis
- José Rodríguez ... "Chupeta"
- Zulay López ... Islem
- Flavio Caballero ... Iván
- Esther Vasquez ... Glenys
- Marisela Buitriago ... Regina
- Julio Gassette ... Policía Narciso
- Alfonso Urdaneta ... Policía Honorato
- Miguel Ángel Landa ... Fish delivery man
- Ron Duarte ... Fisherman
- Antonio Machuca ... Fisherman
- Pedro Durán ... Local
- Pablo Gil ... Local
- Gabriel Cabrera
- María Luisa Foresti
- José Antonio Nadales
