= Amores de fin de siglo =

- Genre: Telenovela; Romance; Drama
- Created by: Leonardo Padrón
- Written by: Leonardo Padrón; Carlos Perez; Mariana Reyes; Doris Segui
- Directed by: Luis Manzo
- Starring: Maricarmen Regueiro; Flavio Caballero; Ruddy Rodríguez; Franklin Virgüez
- Theme music composer: Félix Valentino
- Opening theme: "Adiós amor" by Félix Valentino
- Country of origin: Venezuela
- Original language: Spanish
- No. of episodes: 133

Production
- Executive producer: Carmen Cecilia Urbaneja
- Producer: Leonor Sardi
- Production location: Caracas

Original release
- Network: RCTV
- Release: 25 January – 17 July 1995

Related
- De oro puro; Ilusiones

Amores de fin de siglo is a Venezuelan telenovela created by Leonardo Padrón for RCTV in 1995. The telenovela lasted 133 episodes and was distributed internationally by RCTV International.

The telenovela had an ensemble cast starring Maricarmen Regueiro, Flavio Caballero, Daniel Lugo, Ana Karina Manco, Ruddy Rodríguez, Franklin Virgüez and Gledys Ibarra.

== Synopsis ==
They say that life races furiously along the highways; that it tires with the weight of its people. It is unmistakable... the world is full of noise. In the depths of its cities, inside each room, above the sheets, you can hear the sounds of the urban animals... two clamoring to become one. Since time began, people have struggled themselves into just that: a couple. It is the final equation - and it is the most difficult one of all. This is, in a manner of speaking, a story about relationships governed by the code of love of the 90's. In other words, it is the story of each one of us. It's about the different forms of love which exist beyond each window in a city inhabitabed by millions. But, above all, it is a story about the most scourged term in modern times: marriage.

Two buildings stand symbolically at the center of this metropolis. One, facing south, is inhabited by the middle class. The other faces west, where each day the sun sets on the conglomeration of its most common inhabitants. As we focus on the tenth floor of one of these buildings, we witness the life of two neighboring couples: Santiago and Constanza have been married for seven years. Anastacia and Diego have been married for seven hours. Constanza is a theater actress; a mother tired of being a mother and a woman with a thirst for life. Santiago is a photographer; a man who has ravaged his own life and who now wanders through his marriage with the certainty that love is about to perish. Diego and Anastasia are the other couple; he is a brilliant investigative police officer with a penchant for beautiful women and she is a recent graduate from the school of journalism... a newlywed who, upon entering adulthood, receives a mortal and irrevocable blow to the heart. Both couples will become neighbors, and this will change their lives forever.

At the other end of the city, Ezequiel Camacho, a young belligerent Jesuit, finds himself incurably and eternally drawn to the eyes of Lejana San Miguel - a prostitute whose legendary beauty is encompassed by the turbulence of the night. This marks the beginning of his torment. Both ends of the city will be devastated by the faith of its residents.

We will also look into the love life of a female sexologist, the anxieties suffered by the aerobics instructor, the infidelities of a bank teller, the fantasies of an usher at the movies, the sexual decline of an aging taxi driver, and the disastrous love affairs of a housewife. We will visit every floor, knock on every door, turn on each tiny lamp in the great city. And love will embark on its most arduous task in a story where the most contemporary issues of the '90s touch the lives of its protagonists. Above all, it will deal with the day-to-day situations that defines the lives of couples everywhere: relationships shaped by the nature of each individual - marked by harmony and dissonance; by acts of selfishness and grand acts of self-indulgence; by the strengths of their affection and the small luxuries that passion can afford. Love will feel the power of economic hardships and irritability; of an overdose of work and of sex without fervor. Love will discover what is routine and what is tedious. It will know the exquisite telepathy that exists in a couple. It will be overwhelmed by nocturnal embraces. It will bear witness to its own crisis. Love will ultimately come to comprehend marriage: a bit of heaven, a bit of hell. Or, as was once said in a single phrase: This is a love story that begins where others have ended.

== Cast ==
- Maricarmen Regueiro as Anastasia
- Flavio Caballero as Diego Moncada
- Daniel Lugo as Santiago Palma
- Ruddy Rodríguez as Lejana San Miguel
- Franklin Vírgüez as Ezequiel Camacho
- Ana Karina Manco as Constanza
- Haydee Balza as Gallarda Camacho
- Carlos Cruz as Nazario
- Elba Escobar as Victoria Montalban
- Alejo Felipe as Jorge Lira
- Tomas Henriquez as Fucho Camacho
- Gledys Ibarra as Luna Camacho
- Maria Cristina Lozada as Imperio
- Carlos Marquez as Jose Tadeo Montalban
- Dora Mazzone as La mujer policía Girana
- Jenny Noguera as Amalia
- Linsabel Noguera as Alexandra Moncada
- Carlos Jiménez Q. as Roberto San Miguel
