= Marialejandra Martín =

Venezuelan actress

Marialejandra Martin
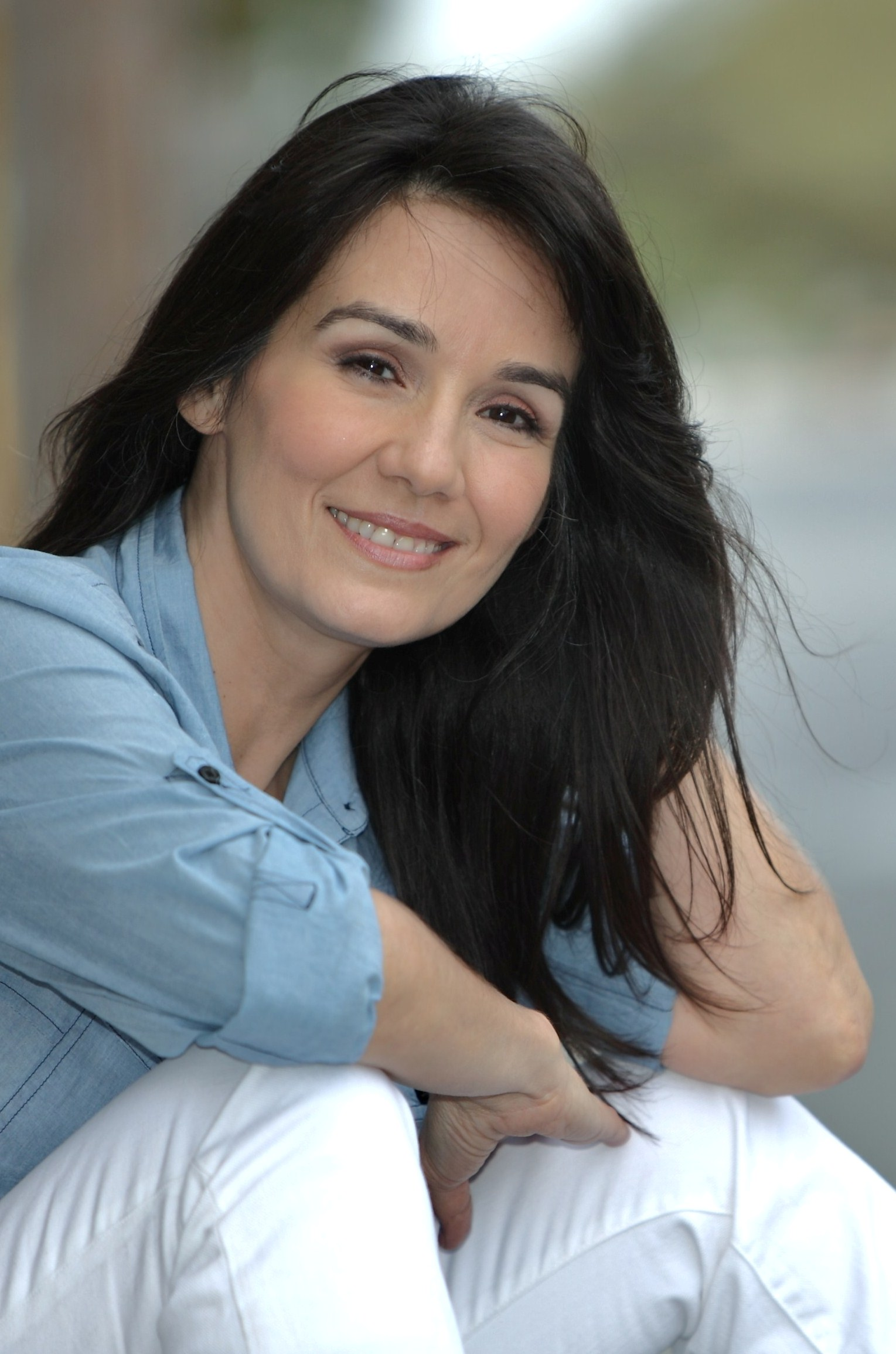
- Born: Marialejandra Martín Castillo; November 23, 1964 (age 61); Caracas, Venezuela
- Other names: Mariale Martin; Alejandra Martin; Maria Alejandra Martin
- Occupations: Actor, director
- Years active: 1986–present
- Parent(s): Américo Martin & Adícea Castillo
- Website: http://www.marialejandramartin.com/

Marialejandra Martín Castillo (born November 23, 1964, in Caracas) is a Venezuelan actress, director, and producer. She starred Venezuelan feature film Ifigenia by director Iván Feo, and is known for her lead role in the television series Por Estas Calles on RCTV (1992–1994).

Her first short film, Qué hago yo aquí (2019), which she wrote, produced, and directed, was selected for more than 20 international film festivals across the USA, India, UK, Romania, France, Australia, Nepal, Italy, Colombia, and Venezuela. It was chosen to represent Venezuela in the FIACINE "Women in Short" showcase by the Spanish-American Federation of Film Academies.

Her second short film, Ritorno, was crowdfunded. It received the Best Fiction Short Film award at the XII Festival ELCO Entre Largos y Cortos de Oriente 2024, Special Mention of the Jury for director Marialejandra Martín at the XVII Festival "Manuel Trujillo Durán" FMTD 2024, Best Actress for Gioia Lombardini, and Best Casting for Marialejandra Martín at the XX Festival del Cine Venezolano 2024.

== Theater ==
Theater
Year	Title	Playwright	Role	Director	Theater			
1986	Las Aventuras del Célebre Detective Harry Dickson	Ricardo García	La tía Caterina	Santiago Sánchez	Sala Juan Sujo, Caracas			
1994	Veronica’s room	Ira Levin	Susan	Carlota Vivas	Teatro Los Riuces, Caracas			
	Señor Bolero	Hernán Marcano	Pasión	Hernán Marcano	Patio de San Bernardino	Nacional Tour, Venezuela		
	…Y las Mujeres También	Fausto Verdial	Conchita	Fausto Verdial	Anna Julia Rojas, Ateneo, Caracas			
1995	The Swan	Elizabeth Egloff	Dora Hamm	Alberto Ísola	Horacio Peterson, Ateneo, Caracas	Teatro Larco, Lima		
1996/97- 2000	Pareja Perfecta	Hernán Marcano	Pasión	Hernán Marcano	Patio de San Bernardino	Nacional Tour, Venezuela	New York Comedy Club, NY	
1998	Profundo	José Ignacio Cabrujas	Elvirita	César Bolívar	Teatro Nacional, Caracas			
2000	Cecè	Luigi Pirandello	Nada	Jim Fitzgerald	Galería Venezuela, NYC			
2001	Love's Labour's Lost	William Shakespeare		Santiago Sánchez	Rajatabla, Ateneo de Caracas			
2002	The Maids	Jean Genet	Claire	Karl Hoffman	Aula Magna UCV, Caracas			
2003	Beyond Therapy	Christopher Durang	Prudence	Carlos Porte	Teatro Trasnocho, Caracas			
2004-2005	Play It Again, Sam	Woody Allen	Linda	Michel Hausmann	Teatro Trasnocho, Caracas			
2007	Ladrona de Almas	Pavel Kohout	Irena	Rodolfo Boyadjian	Anna Julia Rojas, Ateneo, Caracas			
2007	Cascanueces Flamenco	Marius Petipa / Iván Vsévolozhsky	Hada de las Nieves	Juan Carlos Souki	Teatro Santa Rosa de Lima, Caracas			
2008	Cita a Ciegas	Mario Diament	La Psicóloga / La Mujer	Daniel Uribe	Teatro Trasnocho, Caracas			
2008/2010	Decadence	Steven Berkoff	Sybil, Helen	Orlando Arocha	Celarg	Sala de Conciertos, Ateneo, Caracas	Corpbanca	Teatrex
2009	The Cherry Orchard	Anton Chekov	Liubov Andréievna Ranévskaya	Juan Carlos Souki	Celarg, Caracas			
2009	Port Royal	Juan Martínez de la Vega	Isabel	Juan José Martin	Teatro Luis Peraza, Caracas			
2012-2013	Mientras te Olvido	Andrés Correa Guatarasma	Ermenegilda	Flor Núñez	Area Stage Co. Coral Gables	The Pearl Theatre, NYC		
2013	Un Busto al Cuerpo	Ernesto Caballero	Cristina 1	Adela Romero	Trail Theater, Coral Gables	El Nuevo Teatro, Doral. FL		
2014	Casa en Orden	Ana Teresa Sosa	María	Osvaldo Strongoli	Koubek Center Miami Dade College			
2014	The Bedtrick	Matt Moses		Orlando Arocha & Elvis Chaveinte	La Caja de Fósforos, Caracas			
2015	Relatos Borrachos	Enrique Salas	La Mujer	José Manuel Suárez	Urban Couplé, Caracas			
2018	The Humans	Stephen Karam	Deirdre Blake	Ricardo Nortier	La Caja de Fósforos, Caracas			
2018	Ghosts	Henrik Ibsen	Helena Alving	Isaac P. De Castro	Villa Planchart, Caracas			
2022 - 2023 - 2024	El Mistral	Miguel Issa		Miguel Issa	Teatro Teresa Carreno, Caracas	Trasnocho Cultural, Caracas	Concha Acstica de Bello Monte, Caracas	
2023 - 2024 - 2025	Esperando al Italiano	Mariela Romero	Mariantonia	Tullio Cavalli	Trasnocho Cultural, Caracas	Centro Cultural Chacao, Caracas	Centro Italo-venezolano, Valencia	
2024	El Principio de Arquimedes	Josep Maria Miró	Ana	Rafael Barazarte	Trasnocho Cultural, Caracas			

== Filmography ==
Film
Year	Title	Role	Director
1986	Ifigenia	Maria Eugenia Alonso	Iván Feo
1990	Entre Golpes y Boleros	Magaly Blanco	John Dickinson
2001	Em Busca da Ilha Desconhecida	Self	Davi Khamis
2002	Night Light	Charlie’s mother	Eric Escobar
2002	Tosca, la Verdadera Historia	Floria Tosca	Iván Feo
2007	El Señor Presidente	Masacuata	Rómulo Guardia
2008	Perros Corazones	Eva	Carmen La Roche
2011	Patas Arriba	Anita	Alejandro Garcia Wiedemann
2013	Nena, Saludame al Diego	Isabel	Andrea Herrera Catalá
2013	Esclavo de Dios	Rozemblat	Joel Novoa
2015	Travesía	Amapola	Jesús Rondón
2016	Sólo para tus ojos	Ella	Carlos Porte
2019	Historias pequeñas	Antonieta	Rafael Marziano Tinoco
2021	Bridges	Violeta	Maria Corina Ramirez
2022	La Torta	Diana	Carlos Novella
2023	Machera	La madre	Jackson Gutierrez

== Television ==
Television
Year	Title	Role	Notes
1987	Roberta		
1987-1988	Señora	Irina Perdomo Méndez	
1989	Amanda Sabater	Isabel Padilla	
1990-1991	Carmen querida	Carmen Cecilia	
1992-1994	Por estas calles	Euridice Briceño/Eva Marina	
1996	Los amores de Anita Peña	Anita Peña	
1997	Conserjes	Marcía	
2002	Juana la virgen	Ana María Pérez	
2003-2004	Cosita rica	Lara Santana	
2005	Soñar no Cuesta Nada	Olivia Rosas de Hernández	
2006	Por todo lo alto	Divina Alegría	
2007	Aunque mal paguen	Thaís	
2008	La Trepadora	Adelaida Salcedo de Guanipa	
2009	Libres como el viento	Rafaela Marcano	
2014	Demente criminal	Helena González	
2015	Escándalos	Isabel Calderón de Leroux	
2016	Entre tu amor y mi amor	Columba Buendía de Morales	

== TV films ==
- La Raya de Cal (Renato Gutierrez, dir. RCTV, Caracas, 1990)
- El Dueño (Carlos Porte, dir. RCTV, Caracas, 1991)
- La Elegida (Carlos Porte, dir. RCTV, Caracas)

== Radio ==
- Algo Más (Host, RQ910 FM, Caracas)
- Radionovelas for Alberto Cimino’s El Universo del Espectáculo (Fiesta106 FM, Rumbos 670AM & 97.7FM)

== Training ==
- Escuela Nacional de Cine ENC, Caracas. Tutors: Rafael Marziano, Luis Alberto Lamata, Laura Goldberg, etc.
- The Lee Strasberg Theatre Institute, New York. Tutors: George Loros, Robert Castle, Pennie DuPont, Jeffrey Horne, Geofrey Fergusson, Ilka Lomonaco, Jan Douglas y Michael Margotta.
- Taller del Actor, Caracas. Tutors: Enrique Porte, Santiago Sánchez, María Teresa Haiek.
- Grupo Actoral 80, Caracas. Tutors: Juan Carlos Gené, Verónica Oddó, Felicia Canetti y Alberto Isola.
