= La intrusa (1986 TV series) =

- Genre: Telenovela; Romance; Drama
- Created by: Inés Rodena
- Written by: Ana M. Escámez; Benilde Ávila; Zaret Romero
- Directed by: Luis Alberto Lamata
- Starring: Mariela Alcalá; Víctor Cámara; Franklin Virgüez
- Theme music composer: Luis G. González
- Opening theme: Pregunta por ahí by Willie Colón
- Country of origin: Venezuela
- Original language: Spanish
- No. of episodes: 234

Production
- Executive producer: Arquímides Rivero
- Producer: Elizabeth Amiel
- Production company: RCTV

Original release
- Network: RCTV
- Release: May 17, 1986 – January 21, 1987

Related
- La usurpadora (1971); El hogar que yo robé (1981); La usurpadora (1998)

La intrusa is a Venezuelan telenovela produced by Radio Caracas Televisión in 1986. Based on a story written by Inés Rodena, it is a remake of the 1971 telenovela La usurpadora which starred Marina Baura and Raul Amundaray with the new version being written by Ana Mercedes Escámez, Benilde Ávila and Zaret Romero.

Mariela Alcalá played the dual role of twins Virginia and Estrella accompanied by Víctor Cámara as the male protagonist.

== Cast ==
- Mariela Alcalá as Virginia Pérez / Estrella Mendoza De Rossi
- Víctor Cámara as Luis Antonio Rossi
- Franklin Virgüez as Manuel Landaeta
- Rosita Quintana as Renata Rossi
- Carmen Julia Alvarez as Ana Julia Rossi
- Maricarmen Regueiro as Rosa
- Carlos Camara Jr. as Mario Rossi
- Flavio Caballero as Freddy
- Carlos Marquez as Alexis Pereira
- Gledys Ibarra as Belinda
- Jonathan Montenegro as Andres
- Tomás Henríquez as Guillermo Montesinos
- Dante Carlé as Tulipano Morante
- María del Pilar as Juana Landaeta
- Carolina López as Susy Villamolino
- Humberto García as Marcos Fierro
- Willie Colón as Himself
