= Carlos Caridad Montero =

Venezuelan director, scriptwriter, and journalist

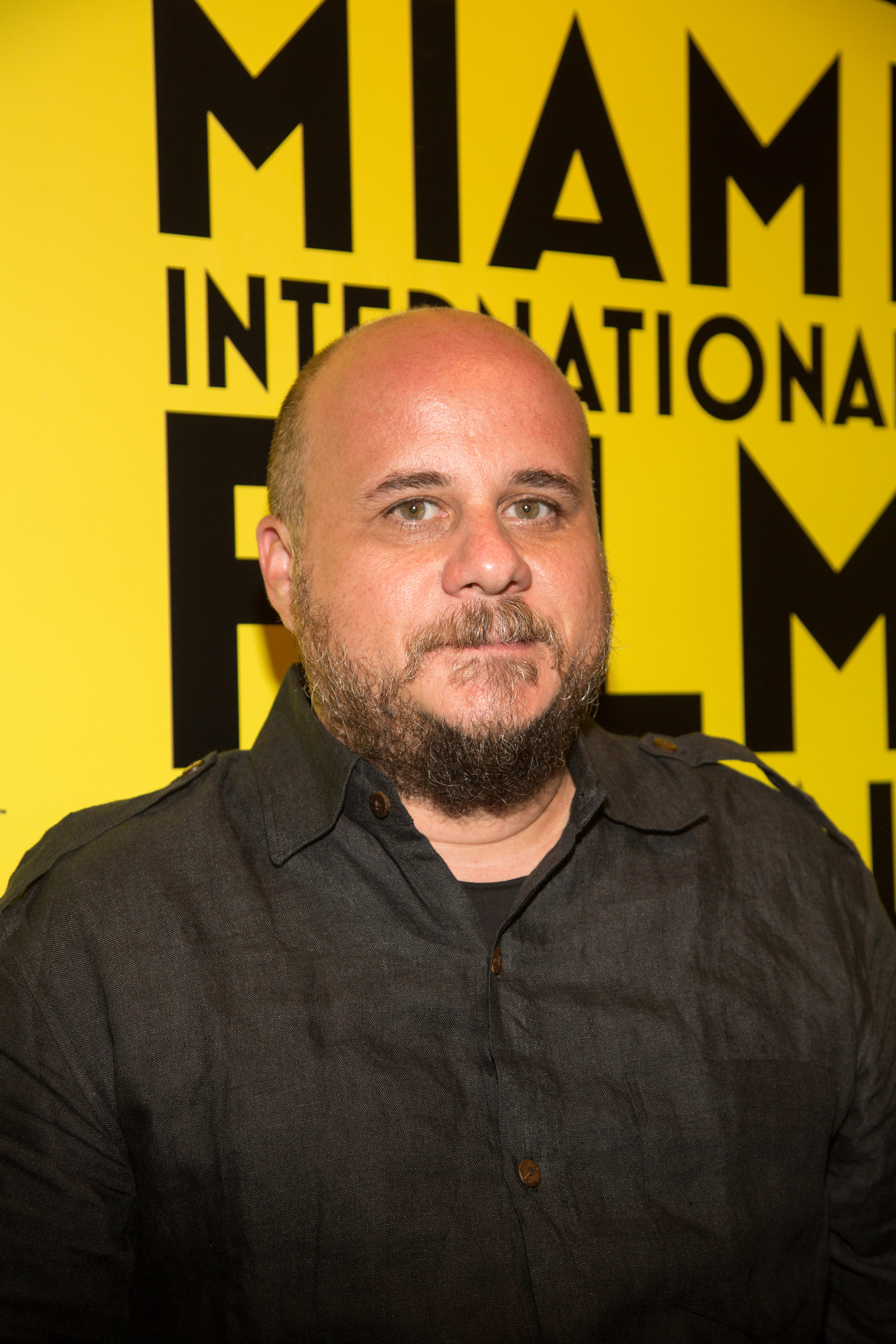
- Montero at the Miami Film Festival presentation of Three Beauties
- Born: 12 August 1967 (age 58)

Carlos Caridad Montero (born 12 August 1967 in Maracaibo, Venezuela) is a Venezuelan film director, scriptwriter, and journalist, from the Escuela de Cine y Televisión de San Antonio de los Baños, Cuba. He now resides in Caracas.

His films include A los pobres les gusta el Mambo, Sólo Nosotros y los Dinosaurios, La Estrategia del Azar, Tarde de Machos, and Nocturno. Tarde de Machos was in the noncompetitive Tous les Cinémas du Monde of the 2006 Cannes Film Festival.

== Filmography ==
- The Rent Girl (2023)
- Sons of the Revolution (2023)
- 3 Beauties (2014)
- Life in the Building Blocks (2008)
- Proyecto sobre Maracaibo (2007) (?) – Documentary
- Nocturno (2003)
- Tarde de Machos (2002)
- La estrategia del Azar (1996)
- Sólo Nosotros y los Dinosaurios (1993) – Documentary
- A los pobres les gusta el Mambo (????)
