= Ilusiones =

Television series

- Genre: Telenovela; Romance; Drama
- Created by: Luis Colmenares
- Directed by: Tito Rojas
- Starring: Crisol Carabal; Vicente Tepedino; Caridad Canelón; Gabriel Fernández
- Opening theme: Vendaval by Samuel
- Country of origin: Venezuela
- Original language: Spanish
- No. of episodes: 135

Production
- Executive producer: Mariana D'Juro
- Producer: Daniel Andrade
- Production company: Radio Caracas Television

Original release
- Network: Radio Caracas Television
- Release: July 26, 1995 – January 22, 1996

Related
- Amores de fin de siglo; Los amores de Anita Peña

Ilusiones (literally: Illusions ) is a Venezuelan telenovela written by Luis Colmenares and produced by Radio Caracas Televisión in 1995. This telenovela lasted 135 episodes and was distributed internationally by RCTV International.

Crisol Carabal and Vicente Tepedino starred as the protagonists.

== Synopsis ==
Marisol Palacios and Octavio Cáceres see each other for the first time at the port, where Marisol awaits the arrival of her best friend, Macarena Guinand. Marisol is an architect and the daughter of Victor Palacios, a respected congressman who heads an environmental protection commission. Octavio is a poor sailor who was raised in that village and does odd jobs at the port and in the city. At the first meeting, they are unaware of what the future holds, since both face societal, cultural and intellectual adversities, opposition from their families, and that they may fall into the hands of those who wish to destroy them. One of these people is Jimena Ferrini, an ambitious woman who had amassed her fortune through illicit business dealings.

At the beginning of the story, Jimena orders Marisol's kidnapping in an attempt to prevent her father from casting his vote at an important session of congress. Jimena's plans are thwarted when Octavio rescues Marisol and flees with her, hiding her at a remote location on the beach. Although Octavio doesn't know Marisol's true identity, they are attracted to one another...and it is the beginning of an intense love that will face formidable obstacles.

Macarena, once Marisol's best friend, falls in love with Octavio and becomes her greatest rival. At the same time, Marisol's father, Victor Palacios, is vehemently opposed to her relationship with Octavio, considering him to be socially inferior to his daughter. Dionisio, Marisol's twin brother, becomes Octavio's mortal enemy. Dionisio has had various confrontations with Octavio in the past, and he had been imprisoned for drug abuse and assault. Blaming Octavio for his incarceration, Dionisio swears that he will kill him. Upon his release from prison, Dionisio has a fierce clash with Octavio. Following this, Dionisio dies of a drug overdose. In an attempt to cover up the truth, Victor changes his son's medical records to make it appear that he died as a result of a beating. Octavio feels responsible for this and lives the agony of believing that he has killed a man. At the same time, Marisol resolves to find the man who killed her brother - not realizing that the man she loves is the one implicated in the crime.

Ultimately, Octavio is accused of the supposed crime and imprisoned. It is then that Jimena Ferrine, who is relentless in her efforts to gain control of the Palacios family, takes advantage of this situation to bring Marisol together with her son Ricardo and forever separate her from Octavio. However, they will soon find that there is no force greater than prison and no barrier that love cannot overcome.

== Cast ==
- Crisol Carabal as Marisol Palacios
- Vicente Tepedino as Octavio Cáceres
- Caridad Canelón as Jimena Ferrini
- Sebastián Falco as Omar Rojas
- Gabriel Fernández as Ricardo Ferrini
- Juan Carlos Alarcón as Pablo Cáceres
- Carmen Julia Álvarez as Altagracia Palacios
- Ricardo Bianchi as Giácomo
- Ana Castell as Hilda Cáceres
- Dad Dager as Rosa Córdoba
- Manuel Escolano as Roberto Guinand
- José Gabriel Gonsalves as Dionisio Palacios
- Bettina Grand as Patrizia Ferrini
- Reina Hinojosa as Mildred
- José Luis Montero as Willy
- Veronica Ortiz as Macarena Guinand
- Amalia Pérez Díaz as Benita Bello
- Alicia Plaza as Reyes, Jorge (IV)
- Loly Sánchez as Margarita Abreu
- Raúl Xiques as Víctor Palacios
- Paola Krum as Lolymar
- Janin Barboza as Belen Cáceres
- Leonardo Oliva as Italo Ferrini
- Judith Vásquez as Soraya
- Enrique Ibañez as Luciano Palacios
