= Carlos Mata =

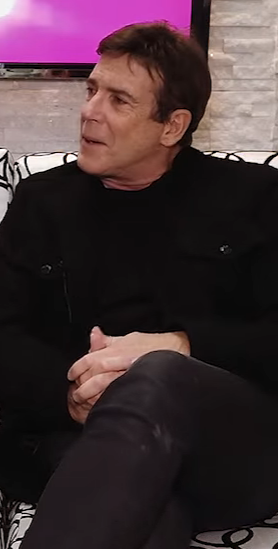
- Mata in September 2015
- Born: Carlos Enrique Mata Iturriza; August 28, 1952 (age 73); Valencia, Venezuela
- Occupations: Actor; singer
- Years active: 1971–present
- Children: 3
- Musical career
- Genres: Balada; Pop
- Instrument: Vocals
- Website: carlosmata.net

Carlos Enrique Mata Iturriza (born August 28, 1952), better known as Carlos Mata, is a Venezuelan television actor and singer. Born in Valencia, Venezuela on August 28, 1952, he is best known for his great career in Venezuelan telenovelas for the companies Venezolana de Televisión, Radio Caracas Televisión and, Venevisión. Mata was the protagonist in 9 telenovelas, among them the most recognized are La dama de rosa (1986), Señora (1988), Las dos Dianas (1992), Déjate querer (1993) and Enamorada (1999), among others. His album "Que por que te quiero" remained for four months on the Billboard charts in 1985, where he shared the stage with artists such as: Miami Sound Machine, Lola Flores, Celia Cruz, Joaquin Sabina, Julio Iglesias, Brigitte Nielsen, Miguel Bosé, among many others.

Through his image, he was the biggest seller of Latin American telenovelas in the world, and was even mentioned by market studies as the third export product of Venezuela, and as the most recognized Spanish non-Spanish character.

== Selected filmography ==
Television roles
Title	Year	Role	Notes
Jugando a vivir	1982	Javier	
Leonela	1983	Willy Gonzalez Díaz	
Topacio	1984	Playback singer	
Cristal	1985	Luis Alfredo Ascanio	
Adriana	1985	Unknown role	
Mansión de Luxe	1986	Rafa	
La dama de rosa	1986	Tito Clemente	
La pasión de Teresa	1987	Guillermo	
Señora	1988	Diego Mendoza	
Anabel	1990	Carlos Eduardo	
Las dos Dianas	1992	Diego / Gabriel	
Déjate querer	1993	Andrés Machado	
Dos mujeres	1999	Francisco Pizarro	
Enamorada	1999	Augusto Contreras	
Amantes de Luna Llena	2000	Alejandro Linares	
Guerra de mujeres	2001	Atanasio Herrera	
Las González	2002	Cristóbal Rojas	
Belinda	2004	Dr. Alfonso Rivas	
Voltea pa' que te enamores	2006	Rómulo García	
La vida entera	2008	Facundo Montoya	
La viuda joven	2011	Ángel Abraham	
Una Maid en Manhattan	2011	Óscar Saldarriaga	
Demente criminal	2015	Captain Omar Zamora	
Luisa	2016	Juan Bautiista Arismendi	
El Señor de los Cielos	2017	Juan Carlos Salvatierra	Recurring role (season 5)
Soltero con hijas	2019	Efraín Robles	
Vuelve a mí	2023	Valentín San Román	Recurring role
The Blue House	2024	Martin	Direct Claaudia Callao

== Awards and nominations ==
Year	Award	Category	Result	Refs
2015	Miami Life Awards	Theater: Principal actor	Won	
