= Cristal (TV series) =

- Genre: Telenovela; Romance; Drama
- Created by: Delia Fiallo
- Written by: Delia Fiallo; Ana M. Escámez; Vivel Nouel; Zaret Romero
- Directed by: Renato Gutiérrez; Daniel Farías; Tito Rojas
- Starring: Lupita Ferrer; Jeannette Rodríguez; Carlos Mata; Raul Amundaray
- Opening theme: "Mi Vida Eres Tu" performed by Rudy La Scala
- Ending theme: "Volvamos A Vivir" performed by Rudy La Scala
- Country of origin: Venezuela
- Original language: Spanish
- No. of episodes: 246

Production
- Executive producer: Jorge Gherardi
- Producer: Oman Pin
- Production location: Caracas
- Production company: RCTV

Original release
- Network: RCTV
- Release: August 5, 1985 – July 12, 1986

Related
- El privilegio de amar (1998); Cristal (2006); Triunfo del amor (2010); Los hilos del pasado (2025)

Cristal is a 1985 Venezuelan telenovela written by Delia Fiallo and produced by Radio Caracas Televisión. This telenovela lasted 246 episodes, and it achieved a significant amount of success inside and outside Venezuela, it was extremely successful in its airing in Spain (where each advertisement that was seen during the transmission of Cristal cost more than seven million pesetas) and Italy. It was distributed internationally by Coral International. Cristal has been rebroadcast more than seven times in Venezuela. Cristal has several adaptations, including a 2006 Brazilian version of the same name distributed by SBT, and three Mexican remakes, El privilegio de amar in 1998, Triunfo del amor in 2010, and Los hilos del pasado in 2025, both distributed by Televisa.

Lupita Ferrer, Jeannette Rodríguez and Carlos Mata starred as the main protagonists with Marita Capote, Jorge Palacios and Zoe Ducós as the antagonists.

== Synopsis ==
Victoria Ascano (Lupita Ferrer), the beautiful and successful owner of the fashion house "Casa Victoria", decides to search for the baby she abandoned years before. At the same time, Cristina (Jeannette Rodríguez), Victoria's daughter leaves the orphanage where she was raised and moves into an apartment with two other girls, Inocencia (Mariela Alcala) and Zoraida (Lourdes Valera), ready to pursue her dream of becoming a model. Cristina is unknowingly hired by Victoria, and she was on her way to becoming a successful model when Victoria discovers that Cristina and Luis Alfredo (Carlos Mata), her stepson, were having an affair. Victoria fires Cristina and Luis Alfredo marries Marion (Marita Capote), his old girlfriend, because she claims to be carrying his child. Shortly after being abandoned by Luis Alfredo and fired by Victoria, Cristina discovers that she, too, is pregnant.

== Cast ==
- Lupita Ferrer as Victoria Ascanio
- Jeannette Rodríguez as Cristina Expósito, a.k.a. Cristal
- Carlos Mata as Luis Alfredo Ascanio
- Raul Amundaray as Alejandro Ascanio
- Marita Capote as Marion Bellorin
- Mariela Alcala as Inocencia
- Lourdes Valera as Zoraida, a.k.a. Cerebrito
- Henry Zakka as Adán
- Zoe Ducós as Luisa
- Lino Ferrer as Piero
- Ileana Jacket as Bertha Girot
- Sonya Smith as Maggie
- Roberto Moll as Darío
- Jorge Palacios as Gonzalo Valladares
- Humberto Garcia as Padre Ángel de Jesús
- Gigi Zanchetta as Eliana Ascanio
- Cecilia Villarreal as Vivian Marshall
- Marlene Maseda as Marlene

== Broadcasters ==
Country	Alternate title/Translation	TV network(s)	Series premiere	Series finale	Weekly schedule	Timeslot
Venezuela	Cristal	Radio Caracas Televisión	1985	1986	Monday to Saturday	10:00 pm
Spain	Cristal	Televisión Española	1989	1990		
Poland	Cristal	TVP3	July 25, 1994	March 17, 1995	Monday to Friday	7:00 pm
Argentina	Cristal	Teleonce (today Telefe)	March 2, 1987	September 5, 1987	Monday to Friday	2:15 pm
Paraguay	Cristal	Canal 9 Cerro Corá (today SNT)	February 2, 1987	August 3, 1987	Monday to Friday	7:00 pm

== See also ==
- List of famous telenovelas
