= Wayuu: la niña de Maracaibo =

- Film poster
- Directed by: Miguel Curiel
- Written by: Miguel Curiel
- Produced by: Miguel Curiel
- Starring: Daniel Alvarado; Karina Velázquez; Asier Hernández
- Edited by: Judilam Goncalves
- Music by: Enrique Rincon Canaan
- Release date: 3 July 2012
- Running time: 100 minutes
- Country: Venezuela
- Languages: Spanish; Wayuunaiki; Euskera

Wayuu: la niña de Maracaibo (English: Wayuu: The Girl from Maracaibo) is a 2012 Venezuelan crime film directed by Miguel Curiel and starring Daniel Alvarado, Karina Velázquez and Asier Hernández. The film premiered in New York City in August 2005, and it opened in other countries, including Venezuela later that year.

== Plot ==
The film centers about the impossible love between Gamero, the King of the Guajiros (Daniel Alvarado) and Chiquinquirá (Karina Velázquez), who decide to live their passional adventure, which is forbidden because he is a wayuu and she is an alijuna (non-wayuu). In order to protect the life of Chiquinquirá, Gamero hires Alatriste (Asier Hernández), a Basque detective with a past that torments him.

== Production ==
Most of the filming was done in the region of La Guajira, in the north of the venezuelan state of Zulia, where the wayuu people live.
