= Mambo y canela =

- Created by: Elsa Echeverría
- Developed by: Venevisión
- Directed by: Carlos Izquierdo
- Starring: Alicia Machado; Marcelo Cezán; Carlota Sosa; Jorge Reyes
- Opening theme: "Mambo y Canela" by La Corte
- Ending theme: "Mambo y Canela" by La Corte
- Country of origin: Venezuela
- Original languages: Spanish; English
- No. of episodes: 47

Production
- Executive producer: Alicia Ávila
- Production location: Caracas
- Editor: Andrea Rios
- Running time: 42-45 minutes

Original release
- Network: Venevisión
- Release: March 12 – May 14, 2002

Mambo y canela is a 2002 Venezuelan telenovela produced by Venevisión and distributed internationally by Venevisión International. Alicia Machado and Marcelo Cezán starred as the main protagonists.

== Plot ==
The love between Canela and Rodrigo is one that has grown out of friendship. Canela is a cheerful young girl who is in love with mambo, although she was in an orphanage and lived a harsh life. She finally lands a job as a product demonstrator, part of a team which participates in conferences and exclusive hotels. During one of these events, she meets Rodrigo, a photographer and son of a powerful businessman. Rodrigo has been cut off from his family after refusing to be in charge of the family business to pursue photography. There is an immediate spark between them even though he is courting Vanessa, a beautiful and sophisticated lawyer. However, things get complicated for the lovers when Canela is accused of killing Rodrigo's father.

== Cast ==
- Alicia Machado as Carmen Yanela "Canela"
- Marcelo Cezán as Rodrigo
- Eileen Abad as Vicky
- Adolfo Cubas as Franco
- Carlota Sosa as Paulina
- Caridad Canelon as Agua Santa
- Daniel Alvarado as Kiko León
- Vicente Tepedino as Nando
- Juan Carlos Vivas as Cosme
- Betsabe Duque as Vanessa
- Jorge Reyes as Daniel Montoya
- Daniel Alvarado as Kiko León "Magallanes"
- Veronica Schneider as Wanda
