= Carissima =

Song
- Written: 1872

Carissima
Performed by the Hamilton College Choir in Spring 2006.

"Carissima" is the alma mater of Hamilton College, words and music by M. W. Stryker in 1872.

After Hamilton became a coeducational institution in 1978, the original lyrics of the song were updated to reflect the fact that not every student was male.
