= Wayuunaiki (newspaper) =

Bilingual monthly newspaper from Venezuela

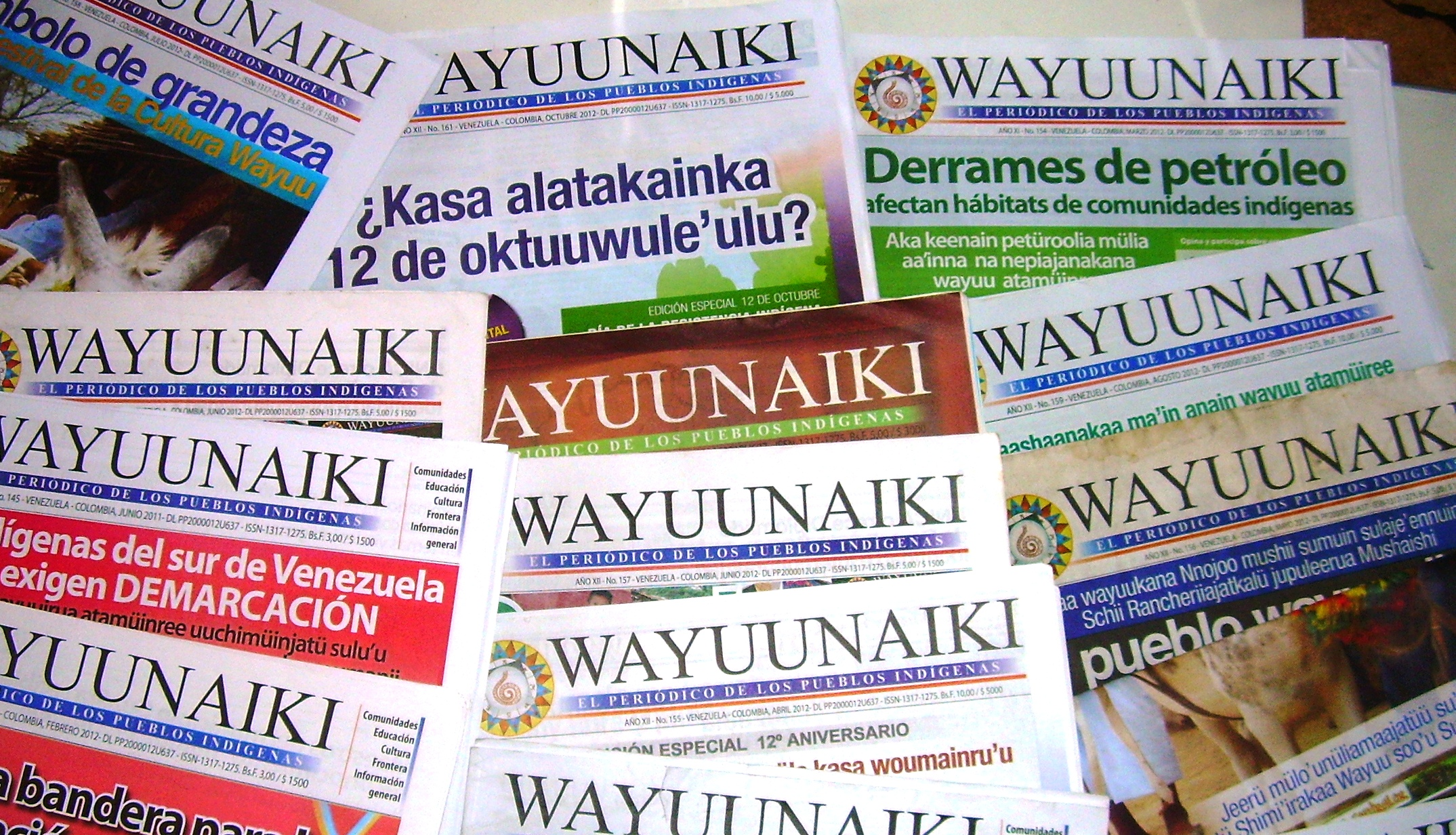
Front page of several editions of Wayuunaiki.

Wayuunaiki is a bilingual monthly newspaper from Venezuela, published in Spanish and Wayuu, with an emphasis on news related to the Wayuu people and other aboriginal peoples of Venezuela and Colombia.

== History ==
Founded in 2000, Wayuunaiki is distributed in Venezuela and Colombia, especially in those regions where the Wayuu people reside. Its founder and current director is Jayariyú Farías Montiel. In 2010, the newspaper was nominated for the "IPDC-UNESCO Prize for Rural Communication", and was awarded fourth place.
