= Trasnocho Cultural =

Cultural complex in Caracas, Venezuela

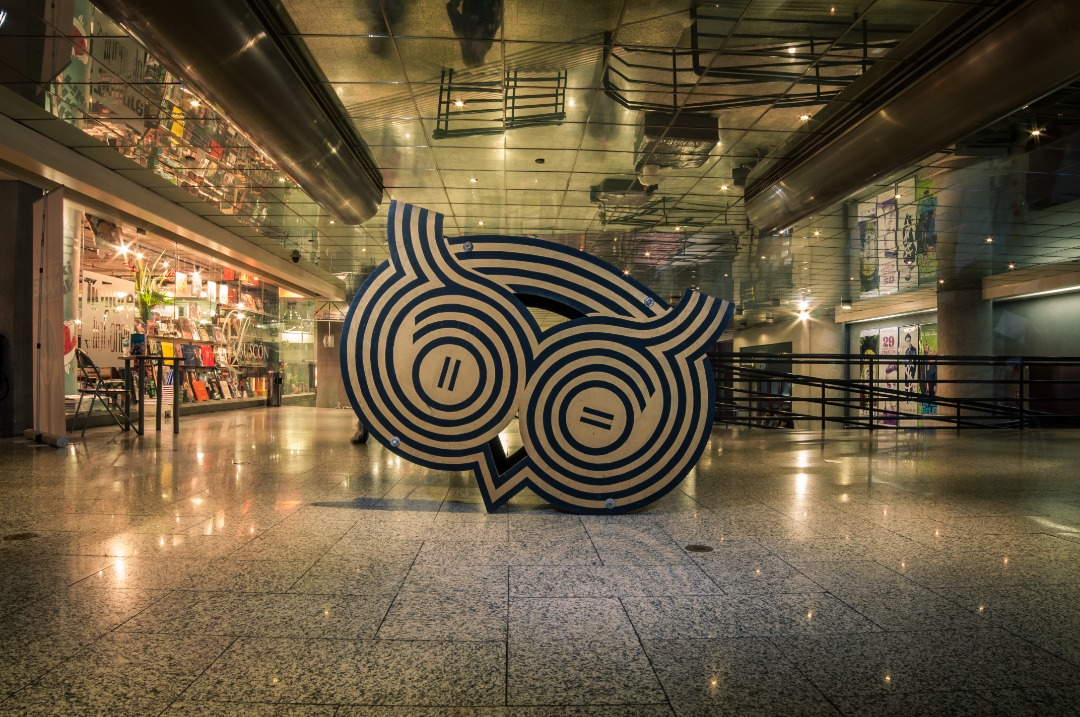
The Trasnocho Cultural logo at the Paseo Las Mercedes.

Trasnocho Cultural is the name given to a multipurpose event space and cultural complex located in the Paseo Las Mercedes shopping mall in the Baruta municipality, east of Caracas, Venezuela.

It consists in a theater, a movie theater, an art gallery, and cultural center located within the Paseo Las Mercedes, specifically on the trasnocho level. It opened on 4 October 2001. A wide variety of events are held there, including numerous plays and movie screenings. It also features bookstores, exhibitions, and various retail stores.
