= Las dos Dianas =

Venezuelan television series

- Genre: Telenovela
- Created by: José Ignacio Cabrujas
- Written by: Carolina Espada; Perla Farías; José Ignacio Cabrujas
- Directed by: Luis Alberto Lamata; Claudio Callao
- Starring: Carlos Mata; Nohely Arteaga; Lupita Ferrer
- Country of origin: Venezuela
- Original language: Spanish
- No. of episodes: 120

Production
- Executive producer: Arnaldo Limansky
- Camera setup: Multi-camera

Original release
- Network: Marte Television
- Release: 1992 – 1992

Las dos Dianas is a Venezuelan telenovela written by José Ignacio Cabrujas and produced by Marte Televisión in 1992.

Carlos Mata and Nohely Arteaga starred as the main protagonists.

== Cast ==
- Carlos Mata as Diego Morales / Gabriel Morales
- Nohely Arteaga as Diana Burgos / Dianita Moncada Burgos
- Lupita Ferrer as Catalina Arismendi de Moncada
- Astrid Carolina Herrera as Jimena
- Julio Pereira as Alfredo Cedeño
- Raquel Castaños as Dulce
- Herminia Martínez as La Danta Carmona
- Rodolfo Drago as Dr.Miranda
- Pedro Renteria as Francisco Monacada
- Luis de Mozos as Leandro
- Lourdes Valera as Rosita Vilariño
- Marlene Maseda as Isabel Moncada
- Lino Ferrer as Martin Paz / Martin Guerra
- Manuel Salazar as Enrique Moncada
- Miguel Ferrari as Mercurio Calderon
- Zamira Segura as Lutecia
- Natalia Fuenmayor as Eloisa
- Javier Paredes as Balbino Cedeño
- Gioia Arismendi as Dianita niña
