= Adriana (TV series) =

1967 Mexican telenovela

- Genre: Telenovela
- Country of origin: Mexico
- Original language: Spanish

Original release
- Network: Telesistema Mexicano
- Release: 1967 – 1967

Adriana is a Mexican telenovela produced by Televisa and originally transmitted by Telesistema Mexicano.

== Cast ==
- Elvira Quintana
- Rafael Banquells
- Magda Guzmán
- Elsa Cárdenas
