= Flavio Caballero =

Venezuelan actor (born 1958)

Flavio Caballero (born October 6, 1958) is a Colombian actor. He is a native of Cartagena, Colombia.

== Biography ==
Flavio Caballero grew up with two childhood dreams: he wanted to become both a psychologist and an actor. When he was in high school, he became more interested in psychology, and he was an above average student, becoming able to attend college, where he pursued a career as a psychologist.

Eventually, he began losing interest in that career, focusing instead on becoming an actor. Caballero began to study acting at the Instituto de Arte Dramatico Juana Sujo.

Caballero established himself in Caracas, Venezuela, where he kept studying acting, at the Instituto Nacional de Teatro de Caracas. He also studied acting in the United States and Brazil.

In 1971, Caballero made his film debut, acting in an Italian-Spaniard-French production, Il Corsaro Nero ("Black Pirate"). Caballero proceeded to act in more than seven theatre plays, and, in 1979, he appeared on Venezuelan screens for the first time, in a film named El Rebaño de los Angeles ("Angel's Herd"). In 1982, Flavio made his telenovela debut, acting in La Señorita Perdomo ("Ms. Perdomo"). That soap opera was the first of seventeen soap operas produced by Radio Caracas Television that Caballero would participate in, including 1983's Leonela, 1987's La Intrusa ("The Intruder") and Mi Amada Beatriz ("My Beloved Beatriz"), 1988's Aventurera ("Adventurer"), and 2002's Mi Gorda Bella ("My Beautiful Fat Girl").

Perhaps Caballero's most important career year was 1989, when he reached international fame starring in Amanda Sabater alongside Maricarmen Regueiro. Caballero played Ivan Moros in the soap opera. Amanda Sabater was an heiress whose father was Diego Sabater. However, and unknown to the two main characters in the soap opera, Diego was really Ivan's father and not Amanda's. This soap opera reached high ratings in many countries, including Mexico, Puerto Rico and (among Hispanics) in the United States.

Caballero is currently under contract with RCN Television of Colombia.

== Filmography ==
- 1988: Señora as Anselmo
- 1989: Amanda Sabater as Ivan Moros
- 1991: El Desprecio as Raúl Velandró
- 2001: La niña de mis ojos as Cristobal
- 2002: Mi gorda bella as Juan Angel
- 2004: Estrambotica Anastasia as Aquiles
- 2006: La Viuda de Blanco as Justino Brinión
- 2008: El Rostro de Analia as Nelson Lares
- 2008: Valeria as Alfredo
- 2011: El Joe La Leyenda as Anibal Ramon
