= El paseo de la gracia de Dios =

- Created by: Marte TV
- Written by: José Ignacio Cabrujas
- Directed by: Luis Alberto Lamata; Claudio Callao; Luis Fernando Gaitán
- Starring: Luis Fernández; Nohely Arteaga; Beatriz Valdés; Carmen Julia Álvarez
- Country of origin: Venezuela
- Original language: Spanish
- No. of episodes: 175

Production
- Running time: 45 minutes

Original release
- Network: Marte TV
- Release: 1993 – 1993

Related
- Pedacito de cielo; La hija de presidente

El paseo de la gracia de Dios ("The Walk of the Grace of God") is a Venezuelan telenovela which starred Luis Fernández, Nohely Arteaga, Beatriz Valdés and Carmen Julia Álvarez. It was produced and broadcast on Marte TV in 1993.

== Synopsis ==
Played out against a backdrop of political upheaval, this story of untamed passion and fatal vengeance throws two lovers together in an impossible affair that can only end in tragedy, unless their love can triumph intense drama of power and romance.

== Cast ==
- Luis Fernández
- Nohely Arteaga
- Beatriz Valdés
- Carmen Julia Álvarez
- Elba Escobar as Concepción Quijano
- Jesus Nebot
- Daniela Alvarado
- Veronica Ortiz as Clara Delfino
- Isabel Moreno as Soledad Mendoza
- Beatriz Fuentes
- Raquel Castaño
- Aitor Gaviria as Antonio Trenard

+ Nelson Diaz as Peter Gonzalez Maria Eugenia Perera
