= Ibsen Martínez =

Venezuelan journalist (1951–2024)

Ibsen Martínez (20 October 1951 – 11 September 2024) was a Venezuelan writer, journalist, and playwright from Caracas.

From 1995 he wrote a weekly column for El Nacional. His writings appeared in El Nuevo Herald, The New York Times, Letras Libres, and El País. Martinez also wrote several plays for the theatre.

He also wrote for various Venezuelan and international outlets, including El Universal, Foreign Policy, El Espectador, Fox News, La Nouvelle Revue Française, Revista de Occidente, ABC, and La Nación. He also wrote plays and published four novels: El Mono Aullador de los Manglares (2000), El señor Marx no está en casa (2009), Simpatía por King Kong (2013), and Oil Story (2023). One of his novels, El señor Marx no está en casa (Mr. Marx is not at home) is a fictional account of the relationship between Karl Marx and Eleanor Marx, one of Marx's daughters.

Martínez also wrote telenovelas. One of them was "Por Estas Calles" (Along these streets) a television drama, in 1992.

Martínez died from a heart attack on 11 September 2024, at the age of 72.
