= Caridad Canelón =

Venezuelan actress

- Born: Caridad Angélica Canelón Zambrano; May 16, 1955 (age 70); Caracas, Venezuela
- Occupation: Actress
- Years active: 1964–present

Caridad Canelón (born May 16, 1955) is a Venezuelan television actress and singer. She has worked as an actress of telenovelas for Radio Caracas Televisión and Venevisión.

== Discography ==
=== Studio albums ===
- 1986 – Atrévete
- 1987 – El hombre que yo amo
- 1991 – Sueños

=== Compilation albums ===
- 1990 – Lo mejor de Caridad Canelón

== Filmography ==
=== Films ===
Year	Title	Role	Notes
2002	Aguas turbulentas	Eneida	Film debut
2008	La Virgen Negra	Leonor	

=== Television ===
Year	Title	Role	Notes
1967	Sor Alegría	Teresita	
1970	Esmeralda	Florcita	
1972	María Teresa	Rosita	
1973	Peregrina	Alina	
1973	Una muchacha llamada Milagros	Purita	
1974	Mamá		
1975	Mariana de la noche		
1976	Cumbres Borrascosas	Cathy Linton	
1976	La zulianita	Dorita	
1977	Rafaela	Belén Martínez	
1978	Tres Mujeres	Carmeliana Guárate	
1981	Elizabeth	Elizabeth	Lead role
1981	Marielena	Haydee	
1981	Maite	Maite	
1982	La goajirita	Analia	
1982	La señorita Perdomo	Srt Perdomo	
1983	Chao Cristina	Dulce María Avecedo	
1984	La salvaje	Mariela Román	
1986	Atrévete		"Capitulo 23" (Season 1, Episode 23)
1988	Señora	Constitución Méndez	
1989	Alondra	Mónica	
1990	Gardenia	Gardenia Montiel	Lead role
1995	Ilusiones	Jimena Ferrini	
1997	Llovizna	Marhuanta Sánchez	
1998–99	El País de las mujeres	Arcadia Gómez de Peña	
1998	Cambio de piel	Leyla Daud	
1999	Toda Mujer	Rebeca	
2000	Hechizo de Amor	Salomé Hernández	
2000	Amantes de Luna Llena	Juana Mayo	
2001	Guerra de mujeres	Bienvenida de Gamboa	
2002	Mambo y canela	Agua Santa	
2002	Las González	Agua Santa	
2003	Engañada	Aurora Leal	
2004	Negra consentida	Trinidad Guaramato de Blanco	
2005	Se solicita príncipe azul	India Pacheco	
2006	Ciudad Bendita	Peregrina de Lobo	
2006	Soltera y sin compromiso	Olga González	Television film
2008	¿Vieja yo?	Aracelis Sánchez	
2011	Que el cielo me explique	Raiza Morales	
2012	Mi ex me tiene ganas	Felipa Franco	
2013	Las Bandidas	Zenaida Mijares "Yaya"	Co-lead role
2014	La virgen de la calle	Azucena Pérez	
