= Por estas calles =

Venezuelan telenovela

- Genre: Telenovela
- Created by: Ibsen Martínez
- Written by: César Sierra; Neida Padilla; Ana Teresa Sosa
- Directed by: Renato Gutiérrez
- Starring: Marialejandra Martín; Aroldo Betancourt; Franklin Virgüez
- Theme music composer: Yordano
- Opening theme: "Por estas calles" by Yordano
- Country of origin: Venezuela
- Original language: Spanish
- No. of episodes: 591

Production
- Executive producer: Alberto Giarroco Mariana Djuro
- Producers: Daniel Andrade; Dulce Teran
- Production location: Caracas

Original release
- Network: Radio Caracas Televisión
- Release: June 3, 1992 – August 30, 1994

Por estas calles (English: On These Streets) is a Venezuelan telenovela broadcast by Radio Caracas Televisión between 1992 and 1994. It was extremely popular in Venezuela, due to its very realistic approach to the day-to-day life of the country and local tone.

It was considered by the Argentinian edition of the magazine Rolling Stone published by La Nación as the 8th best show between the 100 Best TV Shows Ever in all Latin America. It is believed to be the longest-running telenovela ever produced in Venezuela.

== History ==
In early 1992 Venezuela was in a very unstable political situation. At the same time, RCTV was in a low-rating stage. The network decided to take the risk of making a story which took place in the poorest slums of the city in a realistically fashion.

Por estas calles began as a traditional telenovela called Eva Marina. During the pre-production stage, however, the concept changed from a traditional romance to a more actual, street-related story. The original chapters were wiped and the history, now under its new name and concept, began its filming. The name change took place after a meeting with Yordano about using his new song Por estas calles for the telenovela. Producers had realized that the theme of song matched the politico-social situations in Venezuela that they wanted to portray in the telenovela and decided to name the telenovela after the song.

The telenovela was initially written by Ibsen Martínez, but he resigned six months later. It is believed that RCTV demanded him not only an extension (something very usual when a telenovela is very successful) but also a better ending for characters who were very popular but morally questionable, something he was not willing to do. Despite his absence, the telenovela lasted for another year under a team of scriptwriters, and when it ended it was still popular.

== Plot ==
There was not a central story in Por estas calles. At the beginning, the main story revolved around the tribulations of elementary teacher Eurídice Briceño, falsely accused of murder, who has to hide under a new identity. But the other characters soon took bigger screen time, and it became an ensemble story. During its runtime, the telenovela adapted many stories inspired by news headlines.

== Characters ==
The cast was one of the greatest and most memorable in the entire history of Venezuelan telenovelas. Many actors made their big leap to fame with this telenovela, although some of them never escaped from the type of characters they played for this production. Some of the most popular characters were:

- Eurídice Briceño (Marialejandra Martín): the main character. A barrio-raised school teacher who is falsely blamed for the killing of a man. She hides by taking the false identity of "Eva Marina". During the soap opera, she was romantically involved with a judge named Álvaro Infante (interpreted by Aroldo Betancourt) and, later, with the drug lord Sarría Vélez. Although she was the protagonist, she was somewhat overshadowed by the other characters.
- Eudomar Santos (Franklin Virgüez): an archetypical "barrio" man, who cared only about the present day and had no ambition or working disposition. Eudomar is a very opportunistic man, who knows his attractiveness and uses it as his advantage. His catchphrases "que es lo que está pa'sopa" and "Como vaya viniendo vamos viendo" became very popular, and very descriptive of Venezuelan idiosyncrasy. At the beginning of the novela he has an on-off relationship with Eloína Rangel, but later he got another girlfriend.
- Eloína Rangel (Gledys Ibarra): a nurse and single mother, who has to struggle with her daughter and her boyfriend, her feelings towards Eudomar and Dr Valerio, and the hardships of poverty.
- Dr. Arístides Valerio (Roberto Lamarca): an unscrupulous doctor with big ambitions and an overt passion for beautiful women, having many mistresses (Eloína Rangel among them) even if he is married with a beautiful woman. He is basically evil, but in a mischievous and almost playful way, which made him difficult to hate. His main gimmick was that while he says one thing, his real thoughts were heard by the watcher.
- Don Chepe Orellana (Hector Myerston): a rich businessman with political ambitions, and a penchant for breaking the law.
- Natalio Vega "el hombre de la etiqueta" (Carlos Villamizar): an ex-policeman whose son was killed very early in the story. He then becomes a serial killer with a "punisher" attitude, killing criminals he considers beyond rehabilitation. He puts on the big toe of his victims a forensic tag with the word "Irrecuperable" (Unrecoverable); because of this the police (ignoring his real identity) named him "el hombre de la etiqueta" roughly translated as "Tag man". He blames Eurídice for the death of his son, and pursues her.
- Mauro Sarría Vélez (Roberto Moll): a drug lord who likes to show his powers, and falls in love with Eurídice Briceño. First appearing around the middle of the plot, soon became popular.
- Miki Stone (Abby Raymond): an American calculating mobster and drug trafficker
- The Narrator: although the novela has no narrator per se, every chapter ended with a famous phrase, usually related to the main theme of the chapter, read by the veteran actor Tomás Henríquez.

== Controversy and legacy ==
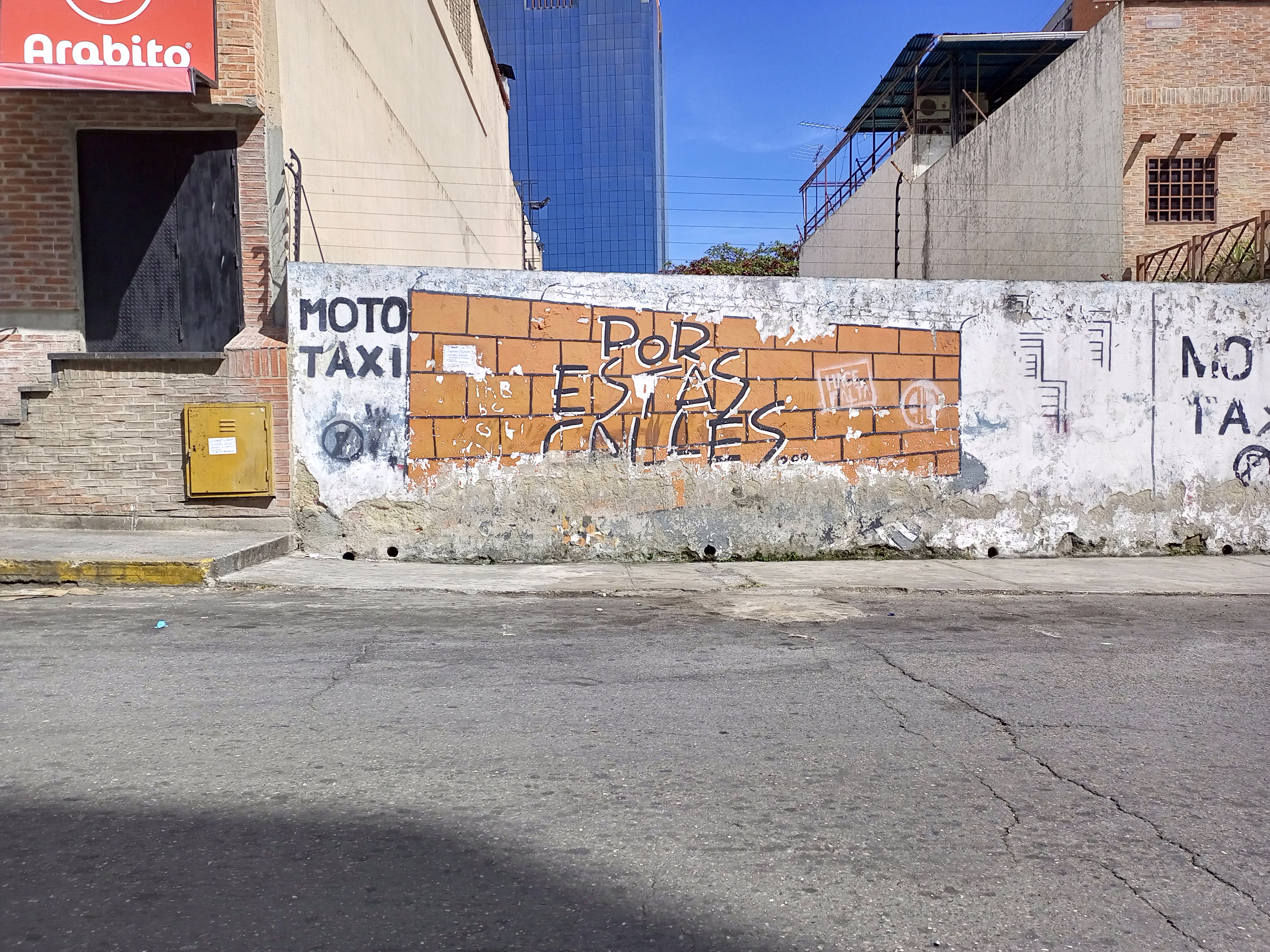
Street art of Por Estas Calles in Caracas.

The telenovela was initially received less than warmly. Many show-business journalists placed little confidence on the success of such a story, which was so radically different from both the classic soap opera and the then relatively new movement of "Telenovela Cultural".

The telenovela was surrounded by a lot of controversies, mostly related to a reported glorification of violence and crime, and with the ripped-off-the-headlines late nature of the story. One of the most notable controversies was related to a boy actor who played a street kid and who became a precocious criminal.

The success of Por estas calles reportedly drove many independent producers into financial ruin, including the then powerful rival Marte TV, which attempted to produce a rival telenovela with similar themes titled El paseo de la gracia de Dios. Unlike Por estas calles, El paseo de la gracia de Dios was not a success, and lasted only a few months.
