= RCTV International =

American TV company broadcasting globally in Spanish

RCTV International Corporation
- Type: Subsidiary of Empresas 1BC
- Industry: Media
- Genre: Television
- Founded: 19 April 1982; 44 years ago
- Headquarters: Miami, Florida, United States
- Area served: Africa, Asia, Europe, Latin America, Middle East, North America
- Parent: Radio Caracas Television RCTV, C.A. (Empresas 1BC)
- Subsidiaries: RCTV Productions, RCTV Play, RCTV International Television
- Website: https://www.rctvinternational.com/

RCTV International Corporation (formerly known as Coral Pictures or Coral International) is a Venezuelan-American subsidiary of Empresas 1BC. Its main headquarters are in Miami, Florida, and has offices in Caracas, Venezuela.

The company was founded in 1982 as Coral Pictures to be the international distributor of RCTV's productions.

== History ==
In 1976, Teverama Florida C.A. is created by RCTV and Venevisión to distribute both of their works internationally. In 1982, RCTV separated from this company, creating Coral Picutres C.A.

In 1986, the company purchased the assets of Ziv International from Lorimar-Telepictures for an undisclosed price, in exchange, L-T received a minority 20% stake in the two Puerto Rico stations owned by RCTV.

In 2006, Coral Pictures was renamed RCTV International Corporation.

RCTV moved to cable in 2007 after the Venezuelan government of Hugo Chavez refused to renew its terrestrial license. In 2010, Venezuelan President Hugo Chavez had taken six cable television channels off the air, including RCTV International, for breaking a law on transmitting government material. The government had urged cable services to drop channels ignoring the rules.

In 2020, SOMOS Distribution acquired the rights to distribute RCTV's telenovelas, series, and other audiovisual content in the Americas.

In 2023, Big Media Signed a deal with RCTV International Corp to become a distributor for its catalog around the world, and for the exclusive distribution rights in Europe and Asia.
