= José Ignacio Valenzuela =

Chilean writer

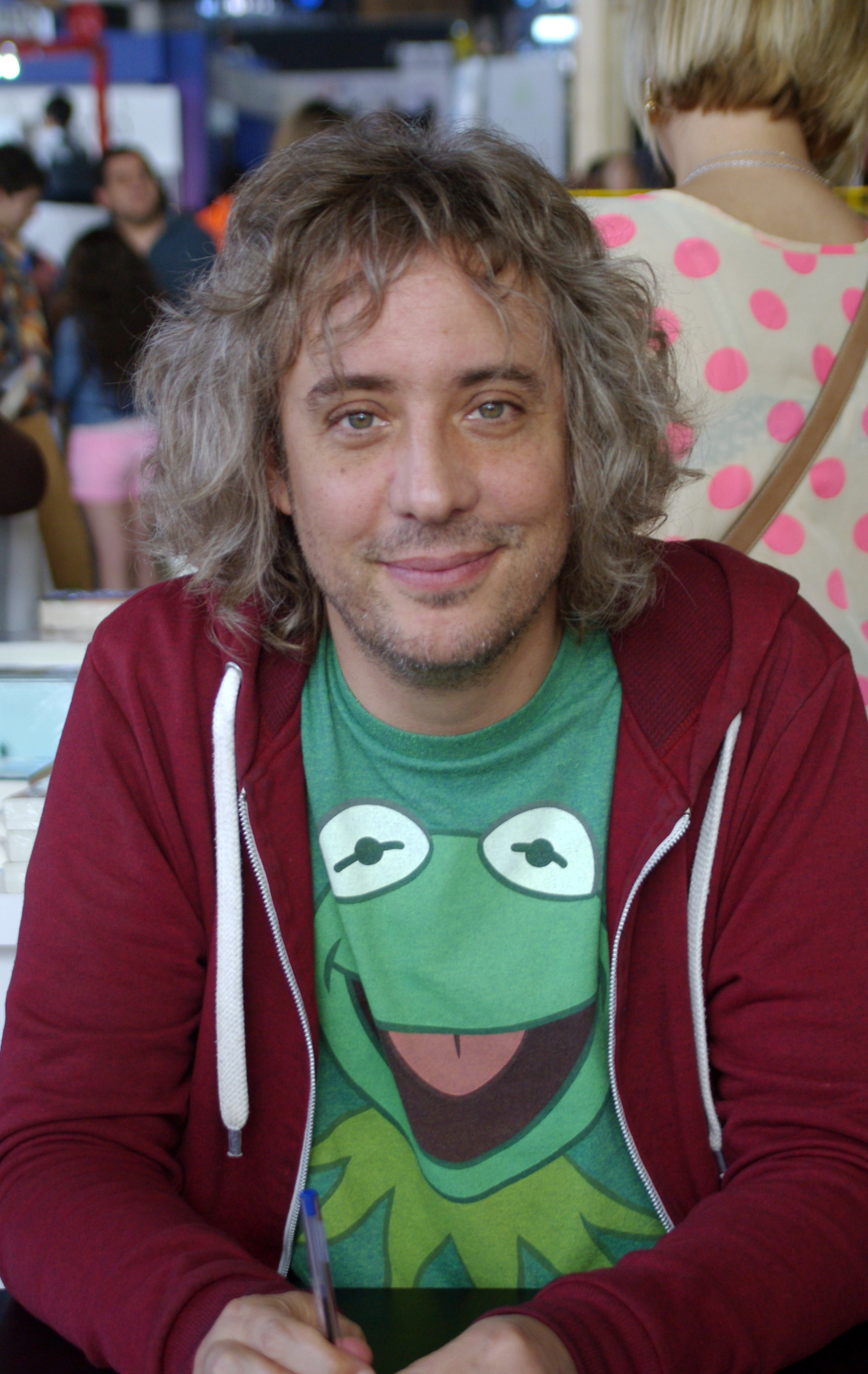
- Born: José Ignacio Valenzuela Güiraldes; April 29, 1972 (age 54); Santiago de Chile, Chile
- Occupations: Author, writer
- Writing career
- Language: Spanish
- Years active: 1995–present

José Ignacio Valenzuela (born April 29, 1972, Santiago de Chile, Chile) also known by the nickname Chascas, is a Chilean writer and screenwriter. Author of scripts for national and foreign soap operas, among which Amor a domicilio, La familia de al lado, Dama y obrero and adaptation of Lola—, He has also participated in the development of various television, literature, film and theater projects in Chile, Mexico, United States and Puerto Rico. He has published a number of novels and short fiction, and has also served as professor and instructor of creative writing.

== Personal life ==
Son of José Miguel Valenzuela Fuentes and Cecilia Violeta Güiraldes Camerati, born in the neighborhood of Las Condes in Santiago de Chile. Nephew of renowned children's author Chilean Ana María Güiraldes, whom he accompanied in 1992 for co-writing program at the National Television Arboliris Chile. He lived 8 years in Puerto Rico, 2 years in New York and nearly 10 years in Mexico. He currently resides in Miami, United States.

== Filmography ==
As a guest
Year	Title	Role	Notes
2012	Sin Dios Ni Late	Himself	Episode dated August 16, 2012
2012	Fruto prohibido	Himself	Season 2, episode 10

As a writer
Year	Title	Notes
1995	Amor a domicilio	Original story and writer
1996	Amor a domicilio, la comedia	Original story and writer
1998	Marparaíso	Original story and writer
1999	Marea Brava	Original story and writer
2000	Sabor a ti	Original story and writer
2003	Corazón de melón	Writer
2004	Amores	Writer
2007	La sangre iluminada	
2007	Lola	Adaptation
2007	Manuela y Manuel	
2009	Las Estrellas del Estuario	
2009	Cuenta Conmigo	Writer
2009	Miente	Adaptation
2010	La familia de al lado	Original story and writer
2011	La casa de al lado	Original story and Adaptation
2013	Dama y obrero	Original idea and screenplay
2013	Santa Diabla	Original story and writer
2021	Who Killed Sara?	Showrunner and writer

== Awards and nominations ==
Year	Award	Category	Work	Result
2011	Premios People en Español			
2011	Premios People en Español	Best Telenovela	La casa de al lado	Nominated
2013	Premios People en Español			
2013	Premios People en Español	Best Telenovela	Dama y obrero	Nominated
2013	Premios People en Español			
2013	Premios People en Español	Best Telenovela	Santa Diabla	Nominated
2014	Miami Life Award			
2014	Miami Life Award	Best Telenovela	Dama y obrero	Nominated
2014	Miami Life Award			
2014	Miami Life Award	Best Telenovela	Santa Diabla	Nominated
2014	Premios Tu Mundo			
2014	Premios Tu Mundo	Best Telenovela	Santa Diabla	Won
