= Wanda D'Isidoro =

Venezuelan actress

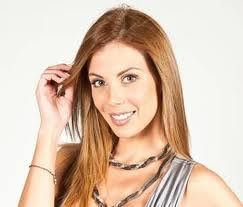
- Born: Wanda Catherine D’Isidoro Arcolín; October 20, 1977 (age 48); Boston, Massachusetts, U.S.
- Occupation: Actress

Wanda Catherine D’Isidoro Arcolín (born October 20, 1977, in Boston, Massachusetts) is a Venezuelan actress. D'Isidoro was born to an American mother and a Sicilian father, who met when her mother was an actress. They married and moved to Venezuela, after she was born.

== Career ==
Her first appearance on television was in the years 1991/1992 when an advertisement of Malt Caracas a man threw in Benji and she was kissed by him when he almost reached the floor. Her charm and beauty allowed her to then enter Venevision.

Started in Venevision, in the "Circo de las Cómplices", where she participated in a competition called "Alice in Wonderland", until she had the opportunity to cheer on "El Club de los Tigritos". Previously, she served as model with Jalymar Salomón in the game show "La Caravana del Dinero".

In 2012, she starred as Priscilla in the Nickelodeon series, Grachi, and Verónica Baeza on El Rostro de la Venganza.

In 2013, she recorded a production of Telemundo starring as Bárbara Cano, (the main villain) in the soap Santa Diabla, which was released in August 2013 and share credits with Gaby Espino, Aaron Diaz, Carlos Ponce and Ximena Duque.

== Filmography ==
Films
Year	Title	Role	Notes
1993	La isla de Los Tigritos	Herself	Television film

Television
Year	Title	Role	Notes
1992	El Circo de las cómplices		
1993	Rosangelica	Ana Melissa	
1994	El Club de Los Tigritos	Herself	Hostess
1997	Destino de mujer		
1997	Rugemania	Herself	
2000	Hechizo de amor	Mabel Alcántara	
2001	Más que amor, frenesí	Virginia Fajardo de Lara	
2004	¡Qué buena se puso Lola!	Mary Poppins	
2005	Mujer con pantalones	Leticia Hewson	
2005	Nunca te diré adiós		
2006	Te tengo en salsa	Beatrice Perroni	
2009	Los misterios del amor	Vanessa García	
2010	El fantasma de Elena	Laura Luna	
2011	Qué el cielo me explique	Elena Flores	
2011-12	Una Maid en Manhattan	Catalina Lucero	
2012	Grachi	Priscila	Recurring role; 31 episodes
2012-13	El rostro de la venganza	Verónica Baeza	
2013	Santa Diabla	Bárbara Cano de Millan	
2014	Reina de corazones	Susana Santillán	
2017	La fan	Guadalupe "Lupita"	
2017	Milagros de Navidad	Claudia	

== Awards and nominations ==
Year	Award	Category	Nominated Work	Result
2007	Premios 2 de Oro	Best Supporting Actress	Amor a Palos	Won
2012	Premios Tu Mundo	Best Supporting Actress	Una maid en Manhattan	Won
