= Ariel Texido =

Cuban actor

- Born: Ariel Díaz Texido; March 19, 1981 (age 44); La Habana, Cuba
- Occupation: Actor
- Years active: 1994–present

Ariel Texido (born March 19, 1981, La Habana, Cuba); is a Cuban actor.

== Filmography ==
Television and films
Year	Title	Role	Notes
2006	Olvidarte jamás	Detective	Supporting role
2006	Las dos caras de Ana	Salvador Lara	Supporting role
2006	La viuda de Blanco	Reporter	Special appearance
2007	Seguro y urgente	Proveedor	Special appearance
2007	Dame chocolate	Manuel	Supporting role
2007	Bajo las riendas del amor	Señor Vidal	Supporting role
2009	Paraíso	Flaco	Film
2009-10	Más sabe el diablo	Andrés Molina	Supporting role
2010	Perro amor	Kike Sánchez	Supporting role
2010	El fantasma de Elena	Tulio Peñaloza	Supporting role
2011	Sacrificio de mujer	Padre Anibal Hernández	Supporting role
2011	La casa de al lado	Danilo Salas	Special appearance
2012	Relaciones peligrosas	Victor Andrade	Supporting role
2013	Rosario	Freddy Hernández	Supporting role
2013	Marido en alquiler	Rosario "Ro" Flores	Supporting role
2015	Dueños del paraíso	Mauricio Riquelme	Supporting role

== Awards and nominations ==
Year	Association	Category	Nominated works	Result
2014	Premios Tu Mundo	Best Supporting Actor	Marido en alquiler	Nominated
