= Premios People en Español (2013) =

The Premios People en Español 2013 are organized by the magazine People en Español and will be held in November of the same year. On October 5, 2013, was announced the list of nominees.

== Awards and nominations for novela ==
Telenovela	Nominations	Awards
Porque el amor manda	8	4
Santa Diabla	7	0
La Tempestad	8	2
El Señor de los Cielos	5	0
Amores Verdaderos	9	0
Corazón Indomable	5	0
Marido en Alquiler	6	1
Qué Bonito Amor	7	1
Dama y Obrero	2	0
La Patrona	7	0

== Telenovelas ==
=== Teleovela of the Year ===
Novela	Result
Porque el amor manda	Won
Santa Diabla	Nominated
La Tempestad	Nominated
El Señor de los Cielos	Nominated
Amores Verdaderos	Nominated
Corazón Indomable	Nominated
Marido en Alquiler	Nominated
Qué Bonito Amor	Nominated
Dama y Obrero	Nominated
La Patrona	Nominated

=== Best Actress ===
Actress	Novela	Result
Ana Brenda Contreras	Corazón Indomable	Nominated
Gaby Espino	Santa Diabla	Nominated
Eiza González	Amores Verdaderos	Nominated
Sonya Smith	Marido en Alquiler	Nominated
Blanca Soto	Porque el amor manda	Won
Danna García	Qué Bonito Amor	Nominated
Ximena Herrera	El Señor de los Cielos	Nominated
Aracely Arámbula	La Patrona	Nominated
Ana Layevska	Dama y Obrero	Nominated
Erika Buenfil	Amores Verdaderos	Nominated

=== Best Actor ===
Actress	Novela	Result
Daniel Arenas	Corazón Indomable	Nominated
Jorge Luis Pila	La Patrona	Nominated
William Levy	La Tempestad	Nominated
Rafael Amaya	El Señor de los Cielos	Nominated
Fernando Colunga	Porque el amor manda	Won
Jorge Salinas	Qué Bonito Amor	Nominated
Juan Soler	Marido en Alquiler	Nominated
Eduardo Yáñez	Amores Verdaderos	Nominated
Aarón Díaz	Santa Diabla	Nominated
Sebastián Rulli	Amores Verdaderos	Nominated

=== Best Female Villain ===
Actress	Novela	Result
Elizabeth Álvarez	Corazón Indomable	Nominated
Maritza Rodríguez	Marido en Alquiler	Won
Marjorie de Sousa	Amores Verdaderos	Nominated
Fernanda Castillo	El Señor de los Cielos	Nominated
Claudia Álvarez	Porque el amor manda	Nominated
Laura Carmine	La Tempestad	Nominated
Malillany Marín	Qué Bonito Amor	Nominated
Christian Bach	La Patrona	Nominated
Liz Vega	Santa Diabla	Nominated

=== Best Male Villain ===
Actress	Novela	Result
Erick Elías	Porque el amor manda	Nominated
Carlos Ponce	Santa Diabla	Nominated}
Iván Sánchez	La Tempestad	Nominated
Roberto Palazuelos	Qué Bonito Amor	Nominated
César Évora	La Tempestad	Won
Joaquín Garrido	La Patrona	Nominated

=== Best Supporting Actress ===
Actress	Novela	Result
María Elisa Camargo	Porque el amor manda	Nominated
Carmen Villalobos	El Señor de los Cielos	Nominated}
Daniela Romo	La Tempestad	Nominated
Sherlyn	Amores Verdaderos	Nominated
Angélica María	Qué Bonito Amor	Won
Erika de la Rosa	La Patrona	Nominated
Virna Flores	Santa Diabla	Nominated
Kimberly Dos Ramos	Marido en Alquiler	Nominated

=== Couple of the Year ===
Actress	Novela	Result
Ana Brenda Contreras & Daniel Arenas	Corazón Indomable	Nominated
Gaby Espino & Aarón Díaz	Santa Diabla	Nominated
Blanca Soto & Fernando Colunga	Porque el amor manda	Won
Ximena Navarrete & William Levy	La Tempestad	Nominated
Erika Buenfil & Eduardo Yáñez	Amores Verdaderos	Nominated
Danna García y Jorge Salinas	Qué Bonito Amor	Nominated
Eiza González & Sebastián Rulli	Amores Verdaderos	Nominated
Aracely Arámbula & Jorge Luis Pila	La Patrona	Nominated
Rafael Amaya & Ximena Herrera	El Señor de los Cielos	Nominated

=== Best New Talent of the Year ===
Actress	Novela	Result
Ximena Navarrete	La Tempestad	Won
Gabriel Coronel	Marido en Alquiler	Nominated
Kimberly Dos Ramos	Marido en Alquiler	Nominated
Sofía Castro	Cachito de Cielo	Nominated
Martín Barba	La Patrona	Nominated
Jeimy Osorio	Porque el amor manda	Nominated

== Televisión ==
=== Entertainment Program of the Year ===
Program	Result
Hoy	Nominated
Un nuevo día	Nominated
Showbiz	Nominated
Ventaneando	Nominated
Despierta América	Won
Sábado Gigante	Nominated
Sal y Pimienta	Nominated

=== Presenter of the Year ===
Presenter	Result
Daisy Fuentes	Nominated
Charytín Goyco	Nominated
Adamari López	Nominated
Karla Martínez	Won
Lourdes Stephen	Nominated
Lili Estefan	Nominated
Giselle Blondet	Nominated
Chiquinquirá Delgado	Nominated

=== Program of the Year Competition ===
Program	Result
X Factor	Won
La Voz Kids	Nominated
Mira quién baila	Nominated
Nuestra Belleza Latina	Nominated
Parodiando	Nominated
Minuto para ganar	Nominated
