= 1st Your World Awards =

Annual US media awards show

2012 Premios Tu Mundo
- Date: August 30, 2012
- Location: American Airlines Arena in Miami, Florida.
- Country: United States
- Presented by: Gaby Espino; Rafael Amaya

Television/radio coverage
- Network: Telemundo
- Viewership: 1.68 million

Your World Awards 2012 is produced by Telemundo, and was broadcast live on August 30, 2012. It was hosted by Gaby Espino and Rafael Amaya. Voting for nominees started on July 25, and ended on August 17, 2012. The awards show averaged 1.68 million viewers. Due to its success, a second edition of Premios Tu Mundo was held on August 15, 2013.

== Winners and nominees ==
=== Telenovela ===
Novela of the Year	Favorite Lead Actress
Mi Corazón Insiste; Corazón valiente; La casa de al lado; La Reina del Sur; Una Maid en Manhattan	Maritza Rodríguez - La casa de al lado; Adriana Fonseca - Corazón valiente; Catherine Siachoque - La casa de al lado; Kate del Castillo - La Reina del Sur; Litzy - Una Maid en Manhattan
Favorite Lead Actor	The Best Bad Boy
Jencarlos Canela - Mi Corazón Insiste; José Luis Reséndez - Corazón valiente; Gabriel Porras - La casa de al lado; Gabriel Coronel - Relaciones peligrosas; Eugenio Siller - Una Maid en Manhattan	Tony Dalton - Flor Salvaje; Manuel Landeta - Corazón valiente; David Chocarro - La casa de al lado; Miguel Varoni - La casa de al lado; Gonzalo García Vivanco - Relaciones peligrosas
The Best Bad Girl	Best Supporting Actress
Aylín Mújica - Corazón valiente; Aylín Mújica - Aurora; Maritza Rodríguez - La casa de al lado; Ana Layevska - Mi Corazón Insiste; Vanessa Villela - Una Maid en Manhattan	Wanda D'Isidoro - Una Maid en Manhattan; Rosalinda Rodríguez - La casa de al lado; Katie Barberi - Mi Corazón Insiste; Daniela Navarro - Relaciones peligrosas; Maritza Bustamante - Relaciones peligrosas
Best Supporting Actor	Best Young Performance
Gabriel Valenzuela - La casa de al lado; Jorge Luis Pila - Aurora; Jorge Consejo - Relaciones peligrosas; Orlando Fundicheli - Relaciones peligrosas; Henry Zakka - Una Maid en Manhattan	Jorge Eduardo García - Una Maid en Manhattan; Briggitte Bozzo - Corazón valiente; Nicole Arci - Corazón valiente; Andrés Cotrino - La casa de al lado; Emily Alvarado - Relaciones peligrosas
The Perfect Couple	The Best Kiss
Ximena Duque and Fabián Ríos - Corazón valiente; Karla Monroig and Jorge Luis Pila - La casa de al lado; Ximena Duque and David Chocarro - La casa de al lado; Carmen Villalobos and Jencarlos Canela - Mi Corazón Insiste; Litzy and Eugenio Siller - Una Maid en Manhattan	Ximena Duque and Fabián Ríos - Corazón valiente; Catherine Siachoque and Miguel Varoni - La casa de al lado; Ximena Duque and David Chocarro - La casa de al lado; Carmen Villalobos and Jencarlos Canela - Mi Corazón Insiste; Ana Layevska and Christian de la Campa- Relaciones peligrosas
Best Bad Luck Moment	Favorite Novela Soundtrack
Andrés ruins Lola Volcán's wedding - Mi Corazón Insiste; Vicente's seduction plan fails - Corazón valiente; Angela confuses the house owner with an employee - Corazón valiente; Love that kills - La Reina del Sur; Marisa confirms that Victor will never change - Una Maid en Manhattan	"Mi corazón insiste" - Jencarlos Canela - Mi Corazón Insiste; "Aurora" - Aurora; "Mi primer amor - Corazón valiente; "La casa de al lado - La casa de al lado; "Amor sin final - Una Maid en Manhattan

=== Music ===
Party Starter Song	Song That Steals My Heart
"Dutty Love" - Don Omar feat. Natti Natasha; Ai Se Eu Te Pego - Michel Telo; "Bailando por el mundo" - Juan Magan feat. Pitbull and El Cata; "Inténtalo" - 3Ball MTY; "International love" - Pitbull	"Las cosas pequeñas" - Prince Royce; "Llamada de mi ex" - La Arrolladora Banda El Limón; "Lo siente mi amor" - Jenni Rivera; "Mi santa" - Romeo Santos feat. Tomatito; "Un hombre normal" - Espinoza Paz
Best Music Video	
"Follow the leader" - Wisin & Yandel feat. Jennifer Lopez; "Bebe bonita" - Chino & Nacho feat. Jay Sean; "Boys will be boys" - Paulina Rubio; "Eres cosa del pasado" - Fidel Rueda; "Para ti solita" - Banda Los Recoditos

=== Variety ===
Favorite Film	Favorite Latino in Hollywood
The Avengers; Men in Black 3; Prometheus; Savages; Snow White and the Huntsman	Jennifer Lopez; Benicio del Toro; Diego Boneta; Demián Bichir; Sofía Vergara
I'm Sexy and I Know It	#MostSocial
Anahí; Cristiano Ronaldo; Natalia Jiménez; Ricky Martin; Romeo Santos	Gaby Espino; Chad OchoCinco; Dulce María; Jenni Rivera; Prince Royce
That's Crazy!	Favorite Viral Video
Caso Cerrado - Man attacking own son's mother; 12 Corazones - Girls wrestling; I Love Jenni - Jenni discusses with her brother on the phone; Nitido - Lupillo Rivera as a referee in a mud fight between two women; Operacion Repo - Altercation between juveniles	Lo mejor de mi vida eres tú; Carrie baila merengue en Miami; Michael Peña y la ñ; "Rolling in the deep" - Vázquez Sounds; Sh*t que dicen las chicas españolas
Sports Sensation of the Year	Most Charismatic Athlete
Marlen Esparza; Julio César Chávez Jr.; Mario Gutierrez; Marco Fabián; Sergio Agüero	Rafael Nadal; Guillermo Ochoa; Luciana Aymar; Paola Espinosa; Victor Cruz
Favorite Supermodel	
Adriana Lima; Alessandra Ambrosio; Fernanda Tavares; Flavia de Oliveira; Gisele Bündchen
