= Santa Diabla =

American telenovela

- Genre: Telenovela
- Created by: José Ignacio Valenzuela
- Screenplay by: José Vicente Spataro; Juan Manuel Andrade; Tabare Pérez
- Directed by: Ricardo Schwarz; Luis Manzo
- Creative director: Valeria Fiñana
- Starring: Gaby Espino; Aarón Díaz; Ximena Duque; Carlos Ponce
- Narrated by: Gaby Espino
- Music by: Tulio Cremisini
- Opening theme: "Santa Diabla" performed by Aarón Díaz and Carlos Ponce
- Country of origin: United States
- Original language: Spanish
- No. of episodes: 136

Production
- Executive producer: Jose Gerardo Guillén
- Producer: Paola Alliegro
- Production locations: Marrero, Louisiana; New Orleans
- Cinematography: Juan Pablo Puentes; Argemiro Saavedra; Joseph Martínez
- Editor: Ellery Albarran
- Camera setup: Multi-camera
- Production company: Telemundo Studios

Original release
- Network: Telemundo
- Release: August 6, 2013 – February 24, 2014

Related
- El Señor de los Cielos; Camelia la Texana

Santa Diabla (literally: Holy Devil, English title: Broken Angel) is an American telenovela written by José Ignacio Valenzuela, and produced by United States–based television network Telemundo Studios, Miami. It stars Gaby Espino, Carlos Ponce, Aarón Díaz, Ximena Duque and Lincoln Palomeque.

Telemundo aired the serial as part of its 2013–2014 season. On August 6, 2013, the network began broadcasting Santa Diabla weeknights at 10pm/9c, replacing El Señor de los Cielos. As with most of its other telenovelas, the network broadcast English subtitles as closed captions on CC3.

== Plot ==
Santa Diabla is the story of Santa Martínez (Gaby Espino), a woman who seeks revenge for the murder of her husband Willy Delgado (Lincoln Palomeque). Santa's revenge includes marrying Humberto Cano (Carlos Ponce), a powerful attorney in Marrero. Humberto hired Willy Delgado to give piano lessons to Humberto's niece Daniela Milan (Ana Osorio) at the Cano family's home, until Bárbara Cano (Wanda D'Isidoro), Daniela's mother and Humberto's sister, accused Willy of harassment and attempted rape of her daughter. Blaming the Canos for the unjust death of her husband, Santa intends to destroy the Cano family, but as she tries to complete her mission, she meets and falls in love with Santiago Cano (Aarón Díaz), Humberto and Bárbara's brother. All the while Inés Robledo (Ximena Duque) who is a rich and evil woman uses her power and influence to try and keep Santiago and Santa apart because of her obsession with Santiago.

Although Humberto is portrayed as the evil brother for most of the series, in a shocking twist, it is revealed that it is Santiago who is the evil brother. Everyone finds this out when it is revealed that Santiago was responsible for the murders occurring in Marrero. Santiago's mental disorder, dissociative identity disorder, causes him to kill people at will. It is also revealed that Humberto was aware of this, but kept it secret to protect his brother. Another reveal is how Santiago found a picture of Santa when he and Willy were in prison, and planned to make Santa his wife. Flashbacks recall that everything Santiago did was calculating and conniving.

In the end, Santa chooses Humberto, even though everybody thinks he's evil (she knows he is good). In the final episode after a dramatic scene, Humberto is killed by Santiago, and Santa never tells him that she is pregnant with his child. Santiago ends up in a mental asylum and it is left unclear if he escapes.

== Cast ==
=== Starring ===
- Gaby Espino as Amanda Brown / Santa Martínez – Main Protagonist. She was the wife of Willy Delgado and passes herself off as Amanda Brown to get revenge on the Cano family for his supposed death. In love with Santiago, later with Humberto.
- Aarón Díaz as Santiago Cano – Main Protagonist/Main Antagonist. The black sheep of the Cano Family, he falls madly in love with Santa and become psychotic after she rejects him. He's Ines's husband and Alicia's twin brother. Ends up in asylum.
- Carlos Ponce as Humberto Cano – Main Antagonist/Protagonist. The oldest of the Cano siblings and a famous lawyer nicknamed the "White Shark". He falls in love with Santa despite knowing her plans against his family. Revealed to be the son of Fransisca and Vicente. He is arrogant and capable of anything in order to achieve what he wants. Killed by Santiago.
- Ximena Duque as Inés Robledo – Main Antagonist. A deranged girl who falls madly in love with Santiago, willing to do everything to have him and keep him away from Santa. Revealed to be Humberto's half-sister. Killed by Santiago.
- Frances Ondiviela as Victoria Coletti – She's the oldest of the Coletti siblings and is in love with Ivan. Ex-wife of Patricio. Dies of breast cancer.
- Roberto Mateos as Patricio Vidal – Antagonist. A man who hates the Coletti family and seeks revenge on them for the death of his mother. Ex-husband of Victoria. Ends up in jail and afterwards killed by Victoria.
- Lincoln Palomeque as Willy Delgado – Ex-husband of Santa and father of Willy. Paula's brother and Ines's ex-boyfriend.
- Wanda D'Isidoro as Bárbara Cano – Antagonist. She's Daniela's mother and sister to Santiago and Alicia, half-sister of Humberto. Ex-wife of George. A vain woman who cares only for herself and neglects her daughter. She's rejected by Willy and sends him to jail. Ends up disfigured.
- Ezequiel Montalt as Jorge "George" Millan – Antagonist. Ex-husband of Bárbara and father of Daniela. Ex-boyfriend of Paula and father of her child. Killed by Alicia/Diabla.
- Lis Vega as Lisette Guerrero – Antagonist, later good. Humberto's ex-girlfriend. Ivan's mother. Ex-wife of Arturo.
- Zully Montero as Hortensia de Santana – Antagonist. Mother of Arturo. A racist woman who despises black people because her eldest son was killed by a black policeman and refuses to accept Arturo's relationship with Mara. She later confesses her crimes and dies of illness.
- Fred Valle as Gaspar Cano – Head of the Cano family. Father of Santiago, Alicia and Barbara. Killed by George.
- Virna Flores as Paula Delgado – Willy's younger sister. George's ex-girlfriend and mother of his child. In love with René.
- Eduardo Orozco as Arturo Santana – Hortensia's son. Lisette's ex-husband. In love with Mara.
- Kenya Hijuelos as Lucy Medina –Former maid at the Cano mansion. Pancho's ex-wife.
- Alberich Bormann as Iván Cano – Son of Humberto and Lisette. He was rejected by Humberto and lived with his mother. In love with Victoria.
- Raúl Izaguirre as Vicente Robledo – Antagonist. Head of the Robledo family. Humberto's biological father and father of Ines and Pancho. Ex-lover of Fransisca. Kidnapped Willy. Killed by Humberto.
- Luis Caballero as Carlos Coletti – Antagonist. Victoria and Ulises's brother. Human trafficker. Killed by Patricio.
- Gerardo Riverón as Padre Milton Reverte – Priest and confidant to many characters.
- Gilda Haddock as Francisca Cano – Antagonist. Mother of Humberto, Santiago, Barbara and Alicia. Gaspar's wife. Ex-lover of Vicente.
- Beatriz Valdés as Begoña Flores – Santa's mother and Willy's ex-lover.
- María Requenel as Tránsito Carvajal – Brothel owner and victim of human trafficking. In love with Carlos.
- Javier Valcárcel as Francisco "Pancho" Robledo – Chief Police Officer and Ines's brother. Humberto's half brother and Lucy's ex-husband.
- Ana Osorio as Daniela Millan – Daughter of Barbara and George. She becomes a drug addict because of her family's instability. In love with Ivan.
- Jorge Eduardo García as Willy Delgado Jr. / Guillermo Cano – Son of Willy and Santa. Becomes mute after his father's death.
- Christian de la Campa as Franco García Herrera / René Alonso – Head drug trafficker who falls in love with Santa, killed by Humberto (Franco). Man forced to be Franco's double, in love with Paula (René).
- Jeimy Osorio as Mara Lozano – Elisa's daughter and Lazaro's ex-girlfriend. In love with Arturo.
- Maki Soler as Alicia Cano / La Diabla – Antagonist. Santiago's twin sister who was abandoned by Fransisca.

=== Recurring ===
- Pedro Telémaco as Lázaro Illianes – Mara's ex-boyfriend. Falls in love with Elisa.
- Carlos Augusto Maldonado as Ulises Colleti – Victoria and Carlos's younger brother. Killed by Santiago
- Gledys Ibarra as Elisa Lozano –Mara's mother. Falls in love with Lazaro.
- Evelin Santos as Gloria
- José Ramón Blanch as Orlando / El Toro / Ricardo Hernández
- Emily Alvarado as Child Alicia Cano

== Production ==
Santa Diabla marks the return of Gaby Espino years after participating in Más Sabe el Diablo and Ojo Por Ojo. The telenovela also marks Carlos Ponce's and Ximena Duque’s first antagonist roles, and the Telemundo debut of Aarón Díaz who signed an exclusivity agreement with Telemundo in 2013. Carlos Ponce and Aarón Díaz composed both the lyrics and music of the theme song of Santa Diabla, and they also performed the theme song for the telenovela. Filming of the telenovela began in late May 2013, and ended in December 2013.

== Awards and nominations ==
Year	Award	Category	Nominated	Result
2013	Premios People en Español			
2013	Premios People en Español	Best Telenovela	José Ignacio Valenzuela	Nominated
2013	Premios People en Español	Best Actress	Gaby Espino	Nominated
2013	Premios People en Español	Best Actor	Aarón Díaz	Nominated
2013	Premios People en Español	Best Female Antagonist	Lis Vega	Nominated
2013	Premios People en Español	Best Male Antagonist	Carlos Ponce	Nominated
2013	Premios People en Español	Best Supporting Actress	Virna Flores	Nominated
2013	Premios People en Español	Couple of the Year	Gaby Espino and Aarón Díaz	Nominated
2013	Special Beauty Awards			
2013	Special Beauty Awards	Television Beauty	Frances Ondiviela	Won
2014	Miami Life Award			
2014	Miami Life Award	Best telenovela	José Ignacio Valenzuela	Nominated
2014	Miami Life Award	Best Leading Female	Gaby Espino	Nominated
2014	Miami Life Award	Best Leading Male	Carlos Ponce	Nominated
2014	Miami Life Award	Best Supporting Actress	Frances Ondiviela	Nominated
2014	Miami Life Award	Best Supporting Actor	Javier Valcárcel	Won
2014	Miami Life Award	Best Leading Lady	Zully Montero	Nominated
2014	Miami Life Award	Best Leading Lady	Gledys Ibarra	Nominated
2014	Miami Life Award	Best Leading Man	Gerardo Riverón	Nominated
2014	Miami Life Award	Best Leading Man	Roberto Mateos	Nominated
2014	Miami Life Award	Best Young Actor	Lincoln Palomeque	Nominated
2014	Premios Tu Mundo			
2014	Premios Tu Mundo	Novela of the Year	José Ignacio Valenzuela	Won
2014	Premios Tu Mundo	Favorite Lead Actor	Aarón Díaz	Nominated
2014	Premios Tu Mundo	Favorite Lead Actress	Gaby Espino	Won
2014	Premios Tu Mundo	The Best Bad Boy	Carlos Ponce	Won
2014	Premios Tu Mundo	The Best Bad Boy	Aarón Díaz	Nominated
2014	Premios Tu Mundo	The Best Bad Girl	Ximena Duque	Won
2014	Premios Tu Mundo	Best Bad Luck Moment	Santa Diabla	Won
2014	Premios Tu Mundo	Best Supporting Actress	Frances Ondiviela	Nominated
2014	Premios Tu Mundo	The Perfect Couple	Gaby Espino and Aarón Díaz	Nominated
2014	Premios Tu Mundo	The Perfect Couple	Gaby Espino and Carlos Ponce	Won
2014	Premios Tu Mundo	First Actress	Gilda Haddock	Won
2014	Premios Tu Mundo	First Actress	Zully Montero	Nominated
2014	Premios Tu Mundo	First Actor	Fred Valle	Nominated
