= ¿Quién es quién? =

American television series

- Genre: Telenovela
- Created by: Laura Sosa
- Written by: Gerardo Cadena; Magda Crisantes; Luis Manuel Martínez; Laura Sosa
- Story by: Delita Betancourt, Roberto Stopello, Alejandro Cabrera, René Arcos, Larissa Contreras, Fernando Aragón, Arnaldo Madrid
- Directed by: Luis Manzo; Ricardo Schwarz
- Starring: Eugenio Siller; Kimberly Dos Ramos; Danna Paola; Laura Flores; Jonathan Islas; Carlos Espejel
- Theme music composer: Alexis Estiz, Alberto Slezynger
- Opening theme: "¿Quién es quién?" performed by Eugenio Siller, Danna Paola and Sito Rocks
- Country of origin: United States
- Original languages: Spanish, English
- No. of episodes: 120 (list of episodes)

Production
- Executive producers: Gemma Lombardi; Joshua Mintz; Carmen Cecilia Urbaneja
- Production locations: Miami, United States
- Editor: Ellery Albarran
- Camera setup: Multi-camera

Original release
- Network: Telemundo
- Release: October 26, 2015 – April 8, 2016

Related
- Amores de mercado (2001); Amor descarado (2003)

¿Quién es quién? (English title: Who is Who?), is an American telenovela produced by Gemma Lombardi, Joshua Mintz and Carmen Cecilia Urbaneja for Telemundo. It is an adaptation of the telenovela produced in 2003, Amor descarado.

Danna Paola, Eugenio Siller, Laura Flores and Carlos Espejel star opposite Kimberly Dos Ramos and Jonathan Islas.

== Production ==
The cast of the telenovela was confirmed on August 18, 2015. The telenovela is filmed in locations such as; Santa Monica, California, Los Angeles, Miami, United States.

== Plot ==
¿Quién es quién? is a story about twin brothers, one rich and the other poor, who were separated at birth and reunited several years later by fate. However their polar opposite lives are switched. Through this journey they search and discover themselves.

== Cast ==
=== Main ===
- Eugenio Siller as Pedro "Perico" Pérez / Leonardo Fuentemayor
- Kimberly Dos Ramos as Fernanda Manrique/Isabela Blanco
- Danna Paola as Paloma Hernandez
- Laura Flores as Inés
- Jonathan Islas as Ignacio
- Carlos Espejel as Basilio

=== Recurring ===
- Gabriel Valenzuela as Jonathan
- Sandra Destenave as Fabiola Carbajal
- Oka Giner as Yesenia
- Guillermo Quintanilla as Elmer Homero Pérez "Chamoy"
- Fernando Carrera as Humberto Fuentemayor
- Daniela Wong as Constanza "Connie"
- Isabella Castillo as Tania Sierra
- Nicolas Maglione as Salvador "Cachito"
- Ximena Duque as Clarita/Blanca Altamira
- Marisa del Portillo as Magdalena
- Silvana Arias as La Cocó
- Armando Torrea as Santiago Manrique
- Gabriel Rossi as Rubén
- Maite Embil as Nora
- Kenya Hijuelos as Ivonne
- Ruben Morales as Justino
- Adrián Di Monte as Eugenio
- Isabel Moreno as Sara
- Alex Ruiz as Terminator
- Maria del Pilar Pérez as Daniela
- Sofia Reca as Renata
- Fernando Pacanins as Melquiades
- Daniela Macias as Lupita
- Gisella Abounrad as Tencha
- Vince Miranda as Sebastián

== Awards and nominations ==
Year	Award	Category	Nominated works	Result
2016	Miami Life Awards	Best Supporting Actor in a Telenovela	Jonathan Islas	Nominated
2016	Premios Tu Mundo	Favorite Lead Actress	Danna Paola	Won
2016	Premios Tu Mundo	Favorite Lead Actor	Eugenio Siller	Nominated
2016	Premios Tu Mundo	The Best Bad Girl	Sandra Destenave	Nominated
2016	Premios Tu Mundo	The Best Bad Boy	Jonathan Islas	Nominated
2016	Premios Tu Mundo	Favorite Supporting Actress	Laura Flores	Nominated
2016	Premios Tu Mundo	Favorite Supporting Actor	Carlos Espejel	Nominated
2016	Premios Tu Mundo	The Perfect Couple	Danna Paola & Eugenio Siller	Won

== Broadcast ==
The series originally aired from October 26, 2015, to April 8, 2016, in Mexico on Gala TV. The series premiered on February 9, 2016, in United States on Telemundo.
