= La Fan =

American telenovela

- Genre: Telenovela; Sitcom
- Created by: Marcela Citterio
- Screenplay by: Roberto Rodriguez; Julieta Steinberg; Marisa Milanesio; Claudia Morales; Eduardo Macías; Teresa Donato
- Story by: Angélica Vale
- Directed by: Miguel Varoni; Otto Rodríguez; Claudio Callao
- Creative director: Valeria Fiñana
- Starring: Angélica Vale; Juan Pablo Espinosa; Miguel Varoni; Scarlet Ortiz; Ximena Duque; Jonathan Islas; Gabriel Porras
- Theme music composer: Miguel Mendonza; Jesús Miranda
- Opening theme: "Soy tu fan" by Chino y Nacho
- Country of origin: United States
- Original language: Spanish
- No. of seasons: 1
- No. of episodes: 54

Production
- Executive producers: José Gerardo Guillén; Carmen Cecilia Urbaneja; David Posada
- Producers: Rafael Villasmil; Jeanette Gómez; Jairo Arcila
- Cinematography: José Luis Velarde; Miguel Font
- Editor: Hader Antivar Duque
- Camera setup: Multi-camera
- Production company: Telemundo Studios

Original release
- Network: Telemundo
- Release: January 17 – April 3, 2017

La Fan, is an American telenovela produced by Telemundo, is a story written by Marcela Citterio and inspired by an idea of history Angélica Vale.

The story revolves around the life of a famous telenovelas actor and his faithful follower who is his number one fan.

The series stars Angélica Vale as Valentina, Juan Pablo Espinosa as Lucas, and Scarlet Ortiz as Salma.

On January 12, 2017, the first chapter of the telenovela was published with a duration of 20 minutes as a special before the premiere.

== Plot summary ==
Vale (Angélica Vale) is a cheerful, humble, simple woman, and a fanatic of a soap opera actor, the famous Lucas Duarte (Juan Pablo Espinosa). The lives of Vale and Lucas cross one day, by what they call destiny, luck or magic. While she is hidden inside a giant Pizza outfit, handing out flyers of the place where she works, she saves her beloved actor's life, but in reality, everything is part of one of the scenes of the telenovela. That is the first meeting between Lucas and Vale, but not the only one. Lucas's representative, Gabriel (Gabriel Porras), comes up with the idea of creating a contest for all his fans and after cheating a little, names Vale the winner. Vale, delighted, has lunch with him and ends up saving his life, now for real. After this Vale becomes his personal assistant and shadow, in other words, his guardian angel. Vale begins to know who Lucas Duarte really is (is hobbies, his defects) but even so, she loves him more and more. Lucas begins to realize who his real fan is...her strength, her light, her brilliance and, in spite of himself, he begins to fall in love with her. But like in every story, there is a dark past, a past that can transform their love into something impossible. Even though neither of them knows, Lucas is the father of Tomás (Emmanuel Perez), the son of Lucia, Vale's friend, who Vale has raised as if it were hers since her friend died. He is the man Vale hates for abandoning her friend. Vale is at a crossroads, she must decide whether to stand up for her deceased friend or to remain what she has always been: the fan.

== Cast ==
=== Starring ===
- Angélica Vale as Valentina Pérez
- Juan Pablo Espinosa as Lucas Duarte
- Miguel Varoni as Justin Case / El Director
- Scarlet Ortiz as Salma Beltrán
- Ximena Duque as Adriana Zubizarreta
- Jonathan Islas as Diego Castro
- Gabriel Porras as Gabriel Bustamante

==== Also starring ====
- Omar Germenos as Carlos Zubizarreta
- Gloria Peralta as Eloisa Romero
- Elsy Reyes as Felicitas
- Begoña Narváez as Jessica González
- Pablo Azar as Benicio Torres
- Gabriel Rossi as Miguel Castro
- Josette Vidal as Miriam del Carmen
- Ricardo Kleinbaum as Enrique Julio Gardiazabal / Quique
- Lorena de la Garza as Natalia
- Gabriel Valenzuela as Nicolás
- Silvana Arias as Bárbara Blanco
- Maritza Bustamante as Lucía Hernández / Úrsula Molina
- Mario Espitia as Agustín Peterlini
- Freddy Florez as Roberto Flores / Bob
- Roberto Plantier as Dr. Damián Arévalo
- Fernando Pacanins as Víctor Carrizo
- Lalo García as Rodrigo Gómez
- Emmanuel Pérez as Tomás Hernández

=== Special guest stars ===
- Laura Flores as Paloma
- Daniel Elbittar as Leonardo Márquez / El Potro
- Catherine Siachoque as Isabel
- Lupita Ferrer as Silvia
- Jorge Luis Pila as El Tuerto
- Jesús Moré as Franco Villar
- David Chocarro as Ricardo Ernesto / Richard Ernestón
- Ligia Petit as Roxana
- Angélica María as Valentina Gardiazabal / Mamita
- Adamari López as Carmen Córdoba
- Wanda D'Isidoro as Guadalupe "Lupita"
- Laura Chimaras as Renata Izaguirre
- Eduardo Serrano as Pascual Blanco
- Sandra Destenave as Dolores "Lola" D'Alessandro
- Fabián Ríos as Guillermo "Willy" del Castillo
- Henry Zakka as Dr. Machado
- Fernanda Castillo as La Parka
- José Ramón Blanch as Rogelio Gutiérrez / La Bestia
- Carlos Ponce as Luis Alberto Fontan
- Jorge Bernal as Himself
- Ahrid Hannaley as Karina
- Dad Dáger as Patricia

== Production ==
The production of the telenovela was confirmed on July 5, 2016, and the production concluded on December 22, 2016. The production is mainly recorded in Miami, the first scenes were made in Los Angeles. Vale explained that the idea arose as she wanted to pay homage to all her fans and followers of the telenovela La fea más bella.

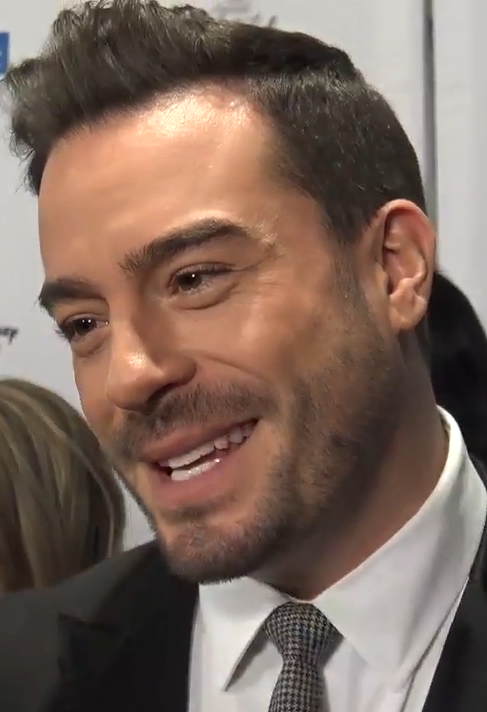
Juan Pablo Espinosa talking about the telenovela in an interview in March 2017

The series is an original idea written by Angélica Vale in 2009, which has a promotional video uploaded to YouTube that same year. The story is adapted by Marcela Citterio based on the idea of Angélica, is directed by Miguel Varoni, Claudio Callao and Otto Rodríguez and as executive producers Carmen Cecilia Urbaneja, José Gerardo Guillén and David Posada and as general producer Angélica Vale. Vale said that the series will have a bit of sitcom format.

=== Promotion ===
The first advance of the telenovela was presenting during the event broadcast by Telemundo entitled, La Fiesta Latina de iHeart Radio. The telenovela was presented in Natpe the same day they finished the production.

=== Casting ===
In May 2016 Angélica Vale confirmed her return to the telenovelas, after being 10 years away from the dramatic genre. On August 3, 2016, Vale confirmed the participation of Juan Pablo Espinosa as the protagonist of the story. Scarlet Ortiz was chosen as the main villain of the story, and marks the debut of the actress in the network Telemundo.Miguel Varoni who besides being the director of the telenovela, his character Justin Case will have the same role of Varoni in the production of the telenovela as it will be a character who works as director, also confirmed the participation of Catherine Siachoque in the production. Espinosa confirmed through his Instagram the participation of Adamari López in the telenovela, the actress and presenter who was 8 years away from the telenovelas.

== Shows cancelled ==
A total of 114 episodes were confirmed for series. Due to the low rating of primetime that had the series, Telemundo canceled the series, despite the number of cliffhangers, and only 54 episodes were programmed to be transmitted.

== Ratings ==
Season	Timeslot (ET)	Episodes	First aired		Last aired	
Season	Timeslot (ET)	Episodes	Date	Viewers (millions)	Date	Viewers (millions)
1	Mon–Fri 8pm/7c	54	January 17, 2017	1.46	April 3, 2017	1.11

== Episodes ==
The series premiered in Mexico at 2pm and had a total of 65 episodes, while in its original broadcast had 54 episodes.

No.	Title	Original release date	US viewers (millions)
1	"Vale conoce a su ídolo"	January 17, 2017	1.46
Valentina Pérez is president of the Lucas Duarte Fan Club. It is his deep admiration for the telenovela actor. He meets him in person and wins a contest, whose prize is to have lunch with him.
2	"Atacan a Lucas"	January 18, 2017	1.28
Vale and Lucas get some privacy during lunch and she does not stop talking. A mobster attacks the actor, but La Fan saves his life. Diego obtains work in the company of Adriana.
3	"La sombra de Lucas"	January 19, 2017	1.25
Lucas gives Vale work, is his personal assistant. Lucas's manager looks for Tomás, son of an old love of the actor, who died. She was La Fan's best friend, so take care of the child.
4	"Beso soñado"	January 20, 2017	1.06
During an unexpected situation, Lucas Duarte kisses La Fan on the street. The photo reaches social networks and becomes viral. Salma, the bride, infuriates and sets a trap for Vale.
5	"¿Boda con un infiel?"	January 23, 2017	1.45
While the scandal breaks out, Salma unknowingly announces her marriage to the love of her life. When you see the photo it rages. Diego now knows why Adriana lives disappointed with men.
6	"Todo por el rating"	January 24, 2017	1.30
Lucas is sincere with Vale and clarifies that the kiss was not for love. Upon learning that the numbers on the TV are on the ground, announces that he is in love with another woman. Gabriel finds out about Thomas.
7	"La farsa continúa"	January 25, 2017	1.21
Lucas again kisses Vale publicly and announces to the media that he never imagined that he would fall in love with a fan. Salma tells him that it is a "sacrifice" for the benefit of both.
8	"Primera cita"	January 26, 2017	1.32
Vale is deceived and runs to help Lucas Duarte. He confesses that he lied and took advantage of it to take her to a night of passion on the first date. Castro is hired as a model.
9	"Rumbo a la fama"	January 27, 2017	1.20
A prestigious magazine asked for an interview with Lucas Duarte, with the condition that it accompanies La Fan. Salma offers twice as much to the private detective, to know who is the father of Tomás.
10	"Carta de un suicidio"	January 30, 2017	1.44
Salma takes a real life attempt at suicide. Leave a letter that breaks the heart to La Fan. Vale makes a decision that will change her life forever. Adriana defies Castro again.
11	"Cómplices"	January 31, 2017	1.23
Lucas and Salma become accomplices and La Fan surprises them. Once again the actor convinces Salma to publicly say that Vale and her boyfriend have nothing to do with the suicide attempt.
12	"La trampa de Salma"	February 1, 2017	1.27
DNA results do not suit you. He orders them to be exchanged for a good sum of money. Vale is delighted, she follows the advice of her friends and talks to Lucas for a new date.
13	"Retrato revelador"	February 2, 2017	1.30
A huge photo of Lucía at Vale's house leaves Lucas worried. The novelty gives insomnia and tells Gabriel. For his part, the manager approaches Thomas, to earn him as a son.
14	"Atracción de dos mundos"	February 3, 2017	1.13
Although Diego recognizes that as an employee of the company Zubizarrieta does not have much opportunity to think of Adriana as a couple, he likes her as a woman. Rodrigo is telling the truth Tomás.
15	"Intuición infantil"	February 6, 2017	1.18
Tomás tells Vale that sooner or later Lucas will make her suffer. La Fan asks Lucas to win the child. Adriana and Diego kiss for the first time. They celebrate the hundred chapters of the novel.
16	"Secuestran a La Fan"	February 7, 2017	1.18
Vale is the victim of a kidnapping. As you owe a favor, you must take care of something very special. Gabriel advises Lucas not to get involved with Vale or Tomás. Salma gives Lucas a weird note.
17	"Lucas es impopular"	February 8, 2017	1.11
Now that Lucas's followers are disillusioned, he goes crazy to see the messages on the networks. Felicitas wants a divorce and seduces the model. Eloísa and Carlos revive the past.
18	"Paternidad mediática"	February 9, 2017	1.26
Lucas assumes the role of paternity, taking charge, even if that "son" is not his. Quique sends one of his thugs to fetch the precious stones. Vale desperates to call Gabriel.
19	"Una para dos"	February 10, 2017	1.20
Lucas and his manager believe that La Fan is dead. The situation puts them to reflect and realize how much they want. Salma kisses Agustin and tells everyone that they have a relationship.
20	"El Fan de La Fan"	February 13, 2017	1.13
Pablo Miro is not only a Fan of La Fan, from now on he is also his assistant. Gabriel and Lucas did not count on "Pablito" is Vale's eyes and ears. Castro is relocated.
21	"¿Compromiso?"	February 14, 2017	1.00
Lucas surprises Vale and shows him an engagement ring. The plan of Gabriel Bustamante does not give result, does not manage to disabuse to La Fan of a very convenient love for the raiting.
22	"Vale pierde la memoria"	February 15, 2017	1.11
La Fan suffers from amnesia. He remembers nothing of his romance with Lucas. He confesses the whole truth and Gabriel tells him that he loves her. Adriana and Diego Castro make love for the first time.
23	"Vale como Marilyn"	February 16, 2017	1.30
La Fan has a new challenge and is nothing less than co-starring with Lucas. He will have to play Marilyn Monroe and sing like her. Carlos and Eloísa have a romantic date on the yacht.
24	"Recordando a Lucía"	February 17, 2017	1.14
Gabriel goes to the cemetery on the anniversary of Lucia's death. There he meets La Fan and Lucas. Gabriela tries to explain why she's there and it's quite a complication. Rodrigo leaves.
25	"Se destapa la mentira"	February 20, 2017	1.22
Gabriel wants to kill Salma for manipulating the DNA results. Now that he knows that he is not Thomas's father, he tells Vale that Lucas had an affair with Lucia.
26	"Vale rompe con Lucas"	February 21, 2017	1.11
Upon learning that her best friend, Lucia had an affair with Lucas, La Fan decides to break their relationship and asks for distance. Adriana appears to be Benicio's girlfriend, to make Diego jealous.
27	"El padre de Tomás"	February 22, 2017	1.14
Now that Vale knows that Lucas and Lucía were partners, he suspects that he is Tomás's father. A DNA test could confirm this. Gabriel tells him, as a friend, to leave it in his hands.
28	"Muerta de celos"	February 23, 2017	1.13
Although Vale broke with Lucas, he admits that he loves his idol. La Fan is witness of a passionate kiss of Lucas and Salma, that makes it explode of jealousy. Adriana and Diego pretend to have a partner.
29	"Gabriel tuerce la verdad"	February 24, 2017	1.20
Bustamante presents some false documents to Vale. Santiago Rodríguez is the alleged father of Tomás who died. The child now thinks he is an orphan. Diego has a night of passion with Jéssica.
30	"Amor fingido"	February 27, 2017	1.06
Not to damage Lucas' career, Vale is following the game to the press. Tom asks to go to Mexico to visit the tomb of his father. Benicio confronts Adriana when he sees her with Castro in the elevator.
31	"Asunto de negocios"	February 28, 2017	1.17
The recording of a commercial of an anti-dandruff product requires the participation of Lucas and La Fan. A kiss is the finishing touch, but Vale appears Lucia and can not do it.
32	"Por el Galán del Año"	March 1, 2017	0.97
Vale calls Lucas Locas to vote for his idol, and although they are no longer engaged, he decides to help him compete for the prize, "Galán del Año." Eloisa agrees to go and live with Carlos, the love of her life.
33	"Poder de persuasión"	March 2, 2017	1.17
Gabriel tries to convince Vale that Lucas is not the ideal type. In real life, she was not a good match for Lucia and for that, she left him. Vale plays the apparitions of her dead friend.
34	"Vale saca las garras"	March 3, 2017	1.18
The antechamber to the award "El Galán del Año" is a media battle. Vale pulled out her nails to defend her relationship with Lucas before the cameras. Adriana blackmails her father, if Heloisa moves.
35	"Triunfador"	March 6, 2017	1.15
Lucas becomes "The Rooster of the Year". They say goodbye as a couple with a passionate kiss. It will be a definitive separation, once the "post contest" effect passes. Adriana says goodbye to Castro.
36	"Sabotaje"	March 7, 2017	1.06
Lucas's mask irritated his skin and had to be bandaged. He suspects that someone sabotaged him. Diego is taken to the police. Gabriel returns to the performance and wants Vale as a couple.
37	"Vale es Rosarito Jiménez"	March 8, 2017	1.05
La Fan and Gabriel start with their characters in the web novel. Jéssica gets the pregnancy test and the result is not the expected one. Adriana apologizes to Castro. He rejects it.
38	"Falsa noticia"	March 9, 2017	1.12
"La Fan left the Galán of the Year for Gabriel", the voice in the networks. Vale suspects that it was Salma and she admits that she is willing to do everything to recover Lucas. She is responsible.
39	"Desmentido en TV"	March 10, 2017	1.07
Vale declares on TV that a ghost was interposed between her and Lucas and have nothing to do with Salma or Gabriel. The fan does not support it and the raiting goes to the ground. Castro returns to work.
40	"Lucas, la víctima"	March 13, 2017	1.15
Vale wants to give up his position as assistant to Lucas. He suffers from severe chest pain upon hearing it and Gabriel assures it is more of his performance. Benicio threatens Castro.
41	"Fuera del aire"	March 14, 2017	1.11
Lucas's novel is replaced by another. He explodes in anger and seeks help with Gabriel. The Fan announces his wedding with Lucas to save the career of his idol. Miriam breaks up with Benicio.
42	"La duda de Vale"	March 15, 2017	1.03
The telenovela reaches the highest level in the rating. Vale is about to give yes. The channel makes an unexpected gift to Lucas. Diego and Adriana agree on the wedding. Benicio reports that he is ill.
43	"¿Luna de miel?"	March 16, 2017	1.09
La Fan invents a new excuse to get rid of the judge who does not agree and gives the yes to Lucas. He surprises Vale and with his words moves her. They spend the night together in a luxury hotel.
44	"Tendencia mundial"	March 17, 2017	0.93
Fame is what matters most to Lucas. He takes some selfies with Vale and becomes a "trending topic". It radiates pure happiness. Rodrigo's father moves to Salma's house.
45	"Reality show a la fuerza"	March 20, 2017	1.04
Lucas takes the cameras to Vale's house with the idea of recording "A Day with the Duarte Family", but La Fan and Tomás reject it. Salma appears surprisingly and kisses Lucas. A scandal on TV.
46	"¿Estafados? o ¿Estafadores?"	March 21, 2017	0.99
La Fan follows the game to Lucas before the TV cameras. They accuse Gabriel of having involved them in a false marriage. For the first time, out of thin air, Lucas kisses Vale and it really does.
47	"Declaración de amor"	March 22, 2017	0.89
Vale is in charge of taking care of Carrizo, the journalist, after the blow that gave him Lucas. By staying alone, La Fan takes a surprise. Salma threatens Lucas. Nicolás has a mission.
48	"La verdad sobre Lucía"	March 23, 2017	1.06
Lucas confesses to Vale that Lucia left him. Diego takes the results of Jessica and runs to tell Adriana. The pressure feels bad and now they doubt if it also expects a baby.
49	"En aprietos"	March 24, 2017	1.04
Carrizo insists on his plan to seduce Vale. She takes courage and uses the sleeping pill Lucas gave her to sleep in the middle of the romantic date. Nicolás kisses Salma forcibly.
50	"El escape de Tomás"	March 27, 2017	0.97
Tomás rejects Lucas, can not stand him and flees. Worth desperate. Castro takes Adriana a pregnancy test, but she says she does not need it. Diego does not want to marry Jéssica.
51	"Secuestran a Lucas"	March 29, 2017	1.08
Lucas is the victim of a kidnapping. Quique and Nicolás have it in their hands and have him sign a contract with a special condition. La Fan dreams that Lucia accepts her relationship with Lucas.
52	"Estrella de cine"	March 30, 2017	1.14
Lucas, as vain as ever, has a priority in his career: making a film in Italy. Benicio proposes to Miriam to be his lover. Adriana finally gets the pregnancy test.
53	"¿Renuncia a todo?"	March 31, 2017	1.11
Lucas surrenders to Vale's feet. Quique threatens them. Adriana suffers, after obtaining the result of the test of pregnancy. Felicitas wants to return to the performance and asks Gabriel for help.
54	"Enlace matrimonial"	April 3, 2017	1.11
Vale and Lucas finally get married. Nicolás locks Salma in the house. Lucía pretends to be Úrsula when she talks to Gabriel. A DNA test destroys Vale. Adriana is going away.

== Awards and nominations ==
Year	Award	Category	Recipient	Result
2017	Your World Awards	Favorite Series	La Fan	Nominated
2017	Your World Awards	Favorite Lead Actor	Juan Pablo Espinosa	Nominated
2017	Your World Awards	Favorite Lead Actress	Angélica Vale	Nominated
2017	Your World Awards	The Best Bad Girl	Scarlet Ortiz	Nominated
2017	Your World Awards	The Best Bad Boy	Gabriel Porras	Nominated
2017	Your World Awards	Favorite Actor	Jonathan Islas	Nominated
2017	Your World Awards	Favorite Actress	Ximena Duque	Nominated
2017	Your World Awards	The Best Actor with Bad Luck	Angélica Vale	Nominated
