= Ismael La Rosa =

Peruvian actor (born 1977)

- Born: March 16, 1977 (age 49); Lima, Peru
- Spouse: Virna Flores
- Children: 2

Ismael Armando La Rosa Fernandini (born March 16, 1977) is a Peruvian actor, known for his roles in telenovelas.

== Biography ==
He was born in San Isidro District, Lima, Peru. Ismael La Rosa is the oldest son of Armando La Rosa Musante and Maria Milagros Fernandini. He has two brothers, Ignacio and Ivan. In December 2008, he married actress Virna Flores. They have been together since meeting on the set of La Rica Vicky in 1997. On June 4, 2010, the couple's first son, Varek, was born. They currently reside in Miami.

== Filmography ==
Year	Title	Role	Notes
1997	La Rica Vicky	Gonzalo Villáran	Main Protagonist
1998–1999	Amor Serrano	Iván Yunque	Main Antagonist
2001	María Emilia: Querida	Miguelón Gómez León	Protagonist
2000	Estrellita	Salvador Sifuentes	Main Protagonist
2001	Éxtasis	N/A	Protagonist
2002	Gata Salvaje	Ivan Rios	Co-Protagonist
2003	Ángel Rebelde	Leonel Anselmi	Main Antagonist
2004	Inocente de ti	Gilberto	Special Appearance
2005	El amor no tiene precio	Juan Carlos Carvajal	Protagonist
2006	Amores como el nuestro	Fausto Dioses	Protagonist
2006	Las Dos Caras de Ana	Eric Guerra	Special Appearance
2008	La traición	Daniel Von Sirak	Special Appearance
2010	¿Dónde Está Elisa?	Nicolás del Valle	Protagonist
2010–2011	Aurora	Federico Álvarez de Toledo	Protagonist
2011-2012	Una Maid en Manhattan	Tadeo Falcón "Tito"	Special Appearance
2013	Marido En Alquiler	Simon	Special Appearance
