= David Ruiz (screenwriter) =

Mexican film director

David Ruiz Gutierrez
- Born: Monterrey, Mexico
- Other names: Leche
- Education: Bachelor of Information and Communication Sciences
- Alma mater: University of Monterrey (Universidad de Monterrey)
- Occupations: Director, producer, writer
- Known for: Who Killed Sara?

David "Leche" Ruiz (born 1974) is a director, producer and writer, best known for directing the 2021 Netflix series Who Killed Sara?

Based in Mexico City, Ruiz began his career directing music videos. He was an executive producer and directed nine episodes of Who Killed Sara? including the pilot and the finale.

== Filmography ==
=== Television (as director) ===
- Morir en Martes 2 (2011 TV Series)
- La Piloto (2017 TV Series) (3 episodes)
- Descontrol (2018 TV Series) (3 episodes)
- Ana (2020 TV series) (10 episodes)
- La Negociadora (2020 TV Series) (7 episodes)
- Who Killed Sara? (2021 TV Series) (9 episodes)
- Candy Cruz (2023 TV Series) (3 episodes)

=== Film (as director and writer) ===
- The Last Death (2011 film)

== Videography ==
=== Artists (videos as music video director) ===
- Control Machete
- Jumbo
- Kumbia Kings
- Alejandro Fernández
- Celso Piña
- Miguel Bosé
- Intocable
- Edith Márquez
- Ricardo Arjona
- Kinky
- Los Claxons
- Julieta Venegas
- Alejandra Guzmán
- Benny Ibarra
- Moenia
- Resorte
- Elefante
