= Gabriel Valenzuela =

Colombian model and actor (born 1981)

- Born: Gabriel Élmer Valenzuela; June 10, 1981 (age 43); Bogotá, Colombia
- Occupation(s): Actor, model
- Years active: 1996–present
- Spouse: Aylín Mújica (m. 2010–2011)
- Children: 3

Gabriel Valenzuela (born June 10, 1981) is a Colombian model and actor.

== Filmography ==
=== Television ===
| Year | Title | Role | Notes |
|---|---|---|---|
| 1996 | Conjunto cerrado | Carlos Arturo | Television debut |
| 1999 | Tabú | Felipe | Recurring role |
| 1999 | Julius, un mundo de sentimientos | Bobby | |
| 2002 | La lectora | Kevin | |
| 2004 | Padres e hijos | Marcos | |
| 2004 | La saga: Negocio de familia | Mauricio Muñoz | |
| 2005 | Los Reyes | Luis Felipe Donoso | |
| 2006 | Floricienta | Chacho | |
| 2007 | El Zorro, la espada y la rosa | Alejandro de la Vega | Episode: "El final" |
| 2007 | La marca del deseo | Esteban Falcón | 4 episodes |
| 2008 | Doña Bárbara | Lorenzo Barquero Joven | Episode: "Lastimar el amor" |
| 2009 | Niños ricos, pobres padres | Gabriel Granados | Recurring role |
| 2011 | La casa de al lado | Emilio Conde | Recurring role |
| 2012 | Corazón valiente | Luis Martínez / Camilo Martínez | Recurring role |
| 2013 | Marido en alquiler | Fernando Sosa | Recurring role |
| 2015 | Dueños del paraíso | José Carlos Quezada | Recurring role |
| 2015 | Demente criminal | Julio Villalobos | Co-lead role |
| 2015-2016 | ¿Quién es quién? | Jonathan García | Recurring role |
| 2017 | La Fan | Nicolás | |
| 2017 | Milagros de Navidad | Tomás | Episode: "Adiós Soledad" |

=== Guest ===
| Year | Title | Role | Notes |
|---|---|---|---|
| 2014 | Tú día alegre | Himself | Episode: "Gabriel Valenzuela y Rio Roma" |

== Awards and nominations ==
| Year | Award | Category | Nominated works | Result |
|---|---|---|---|---|
| 2011 | Miami Life Awards | | | |
| 2011 | Miami Life Awards | Best Supporting Actor | La casa de al lado | Won |
| 2012 | Premios Tu Mundo | Best Supporting Actor | La casa de al lado | |
| 2012 | Premios Tu Mundo | Best Supporting Actor | La casa de al lado | Won |
| 2013 | Miami Life Awards | Best Supporting Actor | | |
| 2013 | Miami Life Awards | Best Male Villain in a Telenovela | Corazón valiente | Won |
