= Una Maid en Manhattan =

Spanish-language American telenovela

- Promotional poster
- Based on: Maid in Manhattan by Edmond Dantes
- Developed by: Luis Zelkowicz
- Written by: Luis Zelkowicz; Leticia López; Gennys Pérez; José G. Ríos
- Directed by: Nicolás di Blassi; Jaime Segura
- Starring: Litzy; Eugenio Siller; Vanessa Villela; Jorge Eduardo García
- Theme music composer: Marco Flores
- Opening theme: "Amor sin final" by Litzy and Eugenio Siller
- Country of origin: United States
- Original language: Spanish
- No. of episodes: 167; 163 (international version)

Production
- Executive producer: Aurelio Valcárcel Carroll
- Producers: Mariana Iskandarani; Veronica Pimstein
- Production locations: Miami; New York City; Los Angeles; Mexico
- Editors: Hader Antivar Duque; Ellery Albarran
- Camera setup: Multi-camera
- Running time: 42–48 minutes (eps 1–158); 21–25 minutes (eps 159–167)
- Production companies: Telemundo Studios; Revolution Studios; Sony Pictures Television

Original release
- Network: Telemundo
- Release: November 29, 2011 – July 23, 2012

Related
- Mi corazón insiste en Lola Volcán; Rosa diamante

Una Maid en Manhattan is a Spanish-language American telenovela produced by Telemundo Studios. It is based on the 2002 film Maid in Manhattan, starring Jennifer Lopez and Ralph Fiennes.

== Plot ==
Una Maid en Manhattan tells the story of Marisa Luján (Litzy), who runs a small hotel in a village in Michoacan. Before the events shown in the show, she falls in love with Victor, an American man who visits Michoacán every year for the Christmas holidays. She becomes pregnant with Victor's child. She leaves Victor, after finding out he cheated, and moves with her son Lalo to New York City, where she works as a maid in Manhattan hotel. She meet her Prince Charming Christobal Parker, with who she falls in love with. Even if their love was unconditional, they face obstacles which they will have to conquer together.

== Cast and characters ==
=== Main ===
- Litzy as Marisa Luján
- Eugenio Siller as Cristóbal Parker Salas
- Vanessa Villela as Sara Montero
- Jorge Eduardo García as Eduardo "Lalo" Mendoza Luján

=== Recurring ===
- Shalim Ortiz as Frank Varela
- Maricela González as Calixta Meléndez
- Paulo Quevedo as Víctor Mendoza
- Tina Romero as Carmen Moreno "La Nana"
- Liz Gallardo as Leticia Robles "Leti"
- Ismael La Rosa as Tadeo Falcón "Tito"
- Jorge Baldini as Franco Rios
- Juan Pablo Llano as Bruno Rivera
- Karen Sentíes as Amelia Salas de Parker
- Fred Valle as Tyron Parker "Ty"
- Jorge Hernández as Estanislao "Polaco"
- Wanda D'Isidoro as Catalina Lucero
- Ana Sobero as Marcela Villa
- Sandra Eichler as Alicia
- Salim Rubiales as Tarek
- Maite Embil as Belinda Delgado
- Karina Mora as Yazmín "Yaya" Mendoza
- Xavier Coronel as Javier Serran
- Jeimy Osorio as Tania Taylor
- Rodrigo Mejía as Gregorio "Goyo"
- Aneudy Lara as Jerome Taylor
- Carlos Athié as Lucas Gonzalez
- Henry Zakka as Amador Colina
- Mónica Pasqualotto as Mireya Sanz
- Patricio Doren as Hugo Reyes
- Daniela Nieves as Alejandra Varela
- Fidel Pérez Michel as Richard Garcia
- Luke Grande as Dr. Martinez
- Khotan Fernández as Miguel Morales "Miguelito"
- Iván Hernández as Steve Martinez
- Liannet Borrego as Sylvia
- Ernesto Tapia as Ronnie
- Adela Romero as Gloria Mendoza
- Victor Corona as Esteban
- Osvaldo Strongoli as Teófilo "Teó"
- Sofia Sanabria as Vicky
- Samir Succar as Officer Conner
- Hely Ferrigny as Manuel Mendoza
- Lina Maya as Natasha
- Gualberto Gonzalez as Lazcano
- Lupillo Rivera as himself
- Carlos Cuervo as Joaquin
- Yami Quintero as Flavia Montes
- Hector Alejandro as Marcus
- Raúl Durán as Julius Thompson
- Duvier Poviones as Bob
- Catalina Mesa as Pilar
- Dayami Padron as Patricia
- Carlos Pítela as Don Serapio
- Omar Nassar as Benjamin Singer
- Raul Arrieta as Anselmo
- Gilbert Peralta as Memo
- Fernando Fermor as Tomás

== Episodes ==
- Release dates, episode name & length, and U.S. viewers based on Telemundo's broadcast.

Episodes
Original aire date	Chapter	Episode title
November 29, 2011	001	Gran estreno
November 30, 2011	002	Triste realidad
December 1, 2011	003	The big apple
December 2, 2011	004	Juego del destino
December 5, 2011	005	Cita inesperada
December 6, 2011	006	Evadir la verdad
December 7, 2011	007	Invitación formal
December 8, 2011	008	La decisión
December 9, 2011	009	Dulces sueños
December 12, 2011	010	Despertar del sueño
December 13, 2011	011	Robo de identidad
December 14, 2011	012	Mundos diferentes
December 15, 2011	013	Cenicienta de Queens
December 16, 2011	014	Todo por amor
December 19, 2011	015	Oportunidades
December 20, 2011	016	Amenaza
December 21, 2011	017	Negocios sucios
December 22, 2011	018	Sello de amor
December 23, 2011	019	Planes siniestros
December 26, 2011	020	Cruel decepción
December 27, 2011	021	Corazones rotos
December 28, 2011	022	Declaraciones falsas
December 29, 2011	023	Errores de cálculo
January 2, 2012	024	Cambio de rumbo
January 3, 2012	025	Pacto de caballeros
January 4, 2012	026	Bajo el mismo techo
January 5, 2012	027	Confesiones y verdades
January 6, 2012	028	Oruga de princesa
January 9, 2012	029	Duelo de fieras
January 10, 2012	030	Entrevista lasciva
January 11, 2012	031	Puntos de giro
January 12, 2012	032	Mentiras verdaderas
January 13, 2012	033	Paso en falso
January 16, 2012	034	Guerra sucia
January 17, 2012	035	Sumas y restas
January 18, 2012	036	Amenaza y venganza
January 19, 2012	037	Amigas y rivales
January 20, 2012	038	Pasión y miedo
January 23, 2012	039	Promesas y verdades
January 24, 2012	040	Vida obra y milagro
January 25, 2012	041	Errores pasionales
January 26, 2012	042	Justicia Propia
January 27, 2012	043	Triste decisión
January 30, 2012	044	Candidato político
January 31, 2012	045	Amor y política
February 1, 2012	046	Alianza tramposa
February 2, 2012	047	Talón de Aquiles
February 3, 2012	048	Amistad y traición
February 6, 2012	049	Mentiras y verdades
February 7, 2012	050	Planes frustrados
February 8, 2012	051	Explosión de amor
February 9, 2012	052	Tiempos de guerra
February 10, 2012	053	Ver la realidad
February 13, 2012	054	Pelea por amor
February 14, 2012	055	Custodia legal
February 15, 2012	056	Maldad y pasión
February 16, 2012	057	Conspiración Política
February 17, 2012	058	Corazón roto
February 20, 2012	059	Infraganti
February 21, 2012	060	La vida sigue
February 22, 2012	061	Mente estratégica
February 23, 2012	062	Fracaso
February 24, 2012	063	Pasará
February 27, 2012	064	Pruebas
February 28, 2012	065	Renuncia
February 29, 2012	066	Dolor profundo
March 1, 2012	067	Gestos disfrazados
March 2, 2012	068	Dolor y culpa
March 5, 2012	069	Plan en marcha
March 6, 2012	070	Operativo policial
March 7, 2012	071	De su propia medicina
March 8, 2012	072	Paso seguro
March 9, 2012	073	Golpe bajo
March 12, 2012	074	Todo en su lugar
March 13, 2012	075	Doble cara
March 14, 2012	076	El peligro acecha
March 15, 2012	077	Sucia política
March 16, 2012	078	Jugarse la vida
March 19, 2012	079	Juego sucio
March 20, 2012	080	Freno al enemigo
March 21, 2012	081	Por todo lo alto
March 22, 2012	082	Amor y peligro
March 23, 2012	083	Dispuestos a todo
March 26, 2012	084	Atentado
March 27, 2012	085	Manipulación
March 28, 2012	086	Perfecto engaño
March 29, 2012	087	Amor y odio
March 30, 2012	088	Confianza rota
April 3, 2012	089	Hechos y palabras
April 4, 2012	090	Amor extremo
April 5, 2012	091	Juego de Celos
April 6, 2012	092	Casualidad y destino
April 9, 2012	093	Oportunidades
April 10, 2012	094	Dosis de veneno
April 11, 2012	095	Comienzo del fin
April 12, 2012	096	Despecho
April 13, 2012	097	Sangre fría
April 16, 2012	098	Amor y búsqueda
April 17, 2012	099	Triste coincidencia
April 18, 2012	100	Ilusiones rotas
April 19, 2012	101	Intenso Dolor
April 20, 2012	102	Metida de pata
April 23, 2012	103	Dolor y Lagrimas
April 24, 2012	104	Paso siguiente
April 25, 2012	105	Renuncia de amor
April 27, 2012	106	Sueño de maid
April 30, 2012	107	Luz de esperanza
May 1, 2012	108	Pacto perverso
May 2, 2012	109	Trampa peligrosa
May 3, 2012	110	Seguridad y confianza
May 4, 2012	111	Contra la pared
May 7, 2012	112	Injusta acusación
May 8, 2012	113	Horrible pesadilla
May 9, 2012	114	Sin salida
May 10, 2012	115	Prueba de fuego
May 11, 2012	116	Destino cruel
May 14, 2012	117	Justos y pecadores
May 15, 2012	118	No hay crimen perfecto
May 16, 2012	119	Amor y política
May 17, 2012	120	Giro inesperado
May 18, 2012	121	Complicaciones
May 21, 2012	122	Lucha del destino
May 22, 2012	123	Posibilidades
May 23, 2012	124	Tarde o temprano
May 24, 2012	125	Injusticias
May 25, 2012	126	Libertad
May 28, 2012	127	Culpas ajenas
May 29, 2012	128	Buenas noticias
May 30, 2012	129	Político en la mira
May 31, 2012	130	Furia de amor
June 1, 2012	131	Triunfo del mal
June 4, 2012	132	Venganza de fuego
June 5, 2012	133	Tragedia
June 6, 2012	134	Segunda víctima
June 7, 2012	135	Pagar cuentas
June 8, 2012	136	Sacrificio
June 11, 2012	137	Sorpresa
June 12, 2012	138	En la mirilla
June 13, 2012	139	Celos incontrolables
June 14, 2012	140	Noticia
June 15, 2012	141	Sospechas
June 18, 2012	142	Defensa
June 19, 2012	143	Compromiso
June 20, 2012	144	Descubierta
June 21, 2012	145	Pregunta de amor
June 22, 2012	146	Nueva aliada
June 25, 2012	147	Sueños cumplidos
June 26, 2012	148	Vida nueva
June 27, 2012	149	Cristóbal senador
June 28, 2012	150	Amor que duele
June 29, 2012	151	Violenta borrachera
July 2, 2012	152	Revelaciones
July 3, 2012	153	Sueño realizado
July 4, 2012	154	Segunda oportunidad
July 5, 2012	155	Fuga y juicio
July 6, 2012	156	Poco a poco
July 9, 2012	157	Castillo de naipes
July 10, 2012	158	Sin pruebas
July 11, 2012	159	A un pie del altar
July 12, 2012	160	Boda interrumpida
July 13, 2012	161	Confesiones
July 16, 2012	162	Plan de escape
July 17, 2012	163	Sed de venganza
July 18, 2012	164	Plan macabro
July 19, 2012	165	Tras el rastro
July 20, 2012	166	Muerte anunciada
July 23, 2012	167	Gran final

== Production ==
Production and filming of Una Maid en Manhattan officially started in late 2011. From November 29, 2011 to July 9, 2012, Telemundo aired the serial weeknights at 8pm/7c, replacing Mi Corazón Insiste. From July 10 to 23, 2012, Telemundo aired half-hour episodes of Una Maid en Manhattan and Rosa Diamante, both sharing the 8pm/7c time slot. As with most of its other telenovelas, the network broadcast English subtitles with closed captions on CC3.

== Reception ==
Telemundo's November 29 broadcast of Una Maid en Manhattan averaged nearly 1.6 million viewers. The series finale broadcast on July 23 averaged 2.1 million viewers, and became one of Telemundo’s strongest novelas ever during its run.

== Awards and nominations ==
Year	Award	Category	Nominated	Result
2012	Premios Tu Mundo	Novela of the Year	Una Maid En Manhattan	Nominated
2012	Premios Tu Mundo	Favorite Lead Actor	Eugenio Siller	Nominated
2012	Premios Tu Mundo	Favorite Lead Actress	Litzy	Nominated
2012	Premios Tu Mundo	The Best Bad Girl	Vanessa Villela	Nominated
2012	Premios Tu Mundo	Best Supporting Actress	Wanda D´Isidoro	Won
2012	Premios Tu Mundo	Best Supporting Actor	Henry Zakka	Nominated
2012	Premios Tu Mundo	The Perfect Couple	Litzy and Eugenio Siller	Nominated
2012	Premios Tu Mundo	Great Young Actor	Jorge Eduardo	Won
2012	Premios Tu Mundo	Best Bad Luck Video	Marisa confirma que víctor nunca va a cambiar	Nominated
2012	Premios Tu Mundo	Best Novela Soundtrack	Amor sin final, by Litzy and Eugenio Siller	Nominated
