= La casa de al lado =

- Genre: Telenovela
- Created by: José Ignacio Valenzuela
- Written by: Juan Marcos Blanco; José Ignacio Valenzuela; Ivette Rivero; Roberto Stopello
- Story by: José Ignacio Valenzuela
- Directed by: Luis Manzo; Ricardo Schwarz
- Starring: Maritza Rodríguez; Gabriel Porras; Miguel Varoni; Catherine Siachoque; David Chocarro; Ximena Duque; Daniel Lugo; Felicia Mercado; Karla Monroig; Jorge Luis Pila
- Opening theme: Suspense theme
- Composer: Tulio Cremisini
- Country of origin: United States
- Original language: Spanish
- No. of episodes: 165

Production
- Executive producer: David Posada
- Producer: Jairo Arcila
- Cinematography: Miguel Font; José Luis Velarde
- Editor: Ramiro Pardo

Original release
- Network: Telemundo
- Release: May 31, 2011 – January 23, 2012

Related
- La Reina del Sur; Relaciones peligrosas; La familia de al lado (2010); Dirty Linen

La casa de al lado (The House Next Door) is an American Spanish-language black comedy telenovela produced by the United States–based television network Telemundo. This mystery is a remake of the Chilean telenovela La familia de al lado produced by TVN in 2010 to 2011 and is being adapted by the author of the original, José Ignacio Valenzuela making a story longer with many differences from the original.

Filming began in April 2011 and was completed in December 2011. From May 31, 2011, to January 23, 2012, Telemundo aired the serial on weeknights at 9 p.m./8c during the 2011–2012 season The version broadcast by Telemundo at 10pm contained an above average level of violence. As with most of its other telenovelas, the network broadcasts English subtitles as closed captions on CC3. In Pakistan, the show was broadcast on Urdu 1 retitled Ek Dhund Si Chayi Hai. In

In Nigeria, the telenovela aired on Televista. In Sub-Saharan Africa, it was broadcast on eAfrica. In Namibia, it aired on NBC3 in July 2019. It was also broadcast on Telemundo Africa.

== Plot ==
This tale is a black comedy with an absurd body-count. It is a circus where people go to the hospital and to jail. The Condes, a wealthy and influential family, appear to have it all: money, power, and a close, beautiful family. They were recently rocked by a tragedy when Adolfo (David Chocarro), husband of the eldest daughter Ignacia Conde (Catherine Siachoque) apparently died by falling out a window in the family mansion. The other 2 siblings of Ignacia are Carola Conde (Ximena Duque) and Emilio Conde (Gabriel Valenzuela). Meanwhile, apparently Adolfo's twin, Leonardo, continues to live in the mansion, confined to a wheel chair. When Gonzalo Ibañez (Gabriel Porras) marries Ignacia 6 months later, he is compelled to unravel the mystery of what happened to Adolfo. Mysterious events begin to envelop the Conde family suggesting that Adolfo is alive and well.

Next door live Pilar Arismendi (Maritza Rodríguez) and her husband, Javier Ruiz (Miguel Varoni), with their two children. Behind the gloss of success and family felicity lurks a dark reality and secrets that threaten to devastate both the Ruiz and Conde families. Javier is a highly regarded and influential attorney, who, for years, is employed by the Condes. Javier's privileged position becomes threatened by Gonzalo, who is appointed Javier's business associate by his powerful father-in-law, Renato Conde (Daniel Lugo). Javier will do anything to protect to what he believes he is entitled. Romantic intrigue develops between the neighbors and further confounds the mysteries, the tension, the dangers, and the suspense that loom large in the novela. Pilar has a sister called Rebeca Arismendi (Karla Monroig).

It is revealed that Ignacia, Carola, and Emilio are not biological siblings, as their parents could not have children, and so they were adopted. Emilio marries Hilda (Sofia Lama) but they divorce after she gives birth to a child with problems and she soon starts to have problems herself. Emilio starts working as gigolo.

Gonzalo/Inaki Mora, Adolfo/Ismael Mora and Leonardo/Ivan Mora turn out to be brothers, being Mabel and Igor's sons. They want to take revenge on the Condes' so they had thrown Ivan out of the window and Adolfo took his place. They murdered several persons who found out their true agenda. The first person to whom is revealed that Gonzalo is a criminal is Matias (Jorge Luis Pila), Rebeca's fiancée. Gonzalo shoots him, Adolfo being present.

Pilar falls in love with Gonzalo and divorces Javier. Gonzalo kidnaps Rebeca after she had found out that Adolfo/Ismael and him are murderers. Adolfo/Ismael discovers her, she manages to escape but he follows her by car and causes her an accident. She remains paralyzed, mute.

Pilar's twin sister, Raquel Arismendi (Maritza Rodríguez) also wants to get revenge and pour out her wrath on the two families, Ruiz and Conde. She wants to destroy Pilar because she had a better life. Cecilia gave her for adoption because she could not raise both of them. Raquel had a bad life, was abused by her stepfather, killed him, ended up in prison. She is the author of "La Casa de al Lado" and "Condenados"; in "Condenados" she announces the next murders. She poisons Sebastian. She shoots Ignacia and kills her. She helped Renato Conde to commit suicide. She has a brief fling with Ismael.

In the series finale, Raquel is accidentally stabbed by Pilar. Ismael is burned to death by Carola. Gonzalo is arrested. But a new family moves in to be another Casa de al Lado with a beautiful wife. The villain Javier does the comical hot diggity reaction to her, and we surmise he will be doing adultery with her soon. A villain triumphs at the end.

== Cast ==
=== Main ===
- Maritza Rodríguez as Pilar Arismendi | Raquel Arismendi
- Gabriel Porras as Gonzalo Ibáñez | Iñaki Mora
- Miguel Varoni as Javier Ruiz
- Catherine Siachoque as Ignacia Conde
- David Chocarro as Adolfo Acosta | Ismael Mora | Leonardo Acosta | Ivan Mora
- Daniel Lugo as Renato Conde
- Felicia Mercado as Eva Spencer
- Karla Monroig as Rebeca Arismendi
- Jorge Luis Pila as Matías Santa María
- Orlando Fundichely as Sebastián Andrade
- Angélica María as Cecilia Arismendi
- Henry Zakka as Igor Mora
- Ximena Duque as Carola Conde
- Sofía Lama as Hilda González
- Rosalinda Rodríguez as Karen Ortega
- Gabriel Valenzuela as Emilio Conde
- Héctor Fuentes as Nibaldo González
- Vivián Ruiz as Yolanda Sánchez
- Alexandra Pomales as Andrea Ruiz
- Andrés Cotrino as Diego Ruiz

=== Guest ===
- Martha Pabón as Mabel Mora
- Miguel Augusto Rodríguez as Omar Blanco
- Ariel Texido as Danilo Salas
- Casey Carys Deniz as a young Carola Conde in episode 100 part 4

== Awards ==
La Casa de al Lado has been nominated for Novela of the Year, Favorite Lead Actress (Catherine Siachoque) and Actor (Gabriel Porras), The Best Bad Boy and Girl, Best Supporting Actress, The Perfect Couple, The Best Kiss, Great Young Actor, and Best Novela Soundtrack. It won Favorite Lead Actress (Maritza Rodríguez) and Best Supporting Actor.

Year	Award	Category	Nominee	Result
2012	Premios Tu Mundo	Novela of the Year	La Casa de al Lado	Nominated
2012	Premios Tu Mundo	Favorite Lead Actress	Maritza Rodríguez	Won
2012	Premios Tu Mundo	Favorite Lead Actress	Catherine Siachoque	Nominated
2012	Premios Tu Mundo	Favorite Lead Actor	Gabriel Porras	Nominated
2012	Premios Tu Mundo	The Best Bad Boy	Miguel Varoni; David Chocarro	Nominated
2012	Premios Tu Mundo	The Best Bad Girl	Maritza Rodríguez	Nominated
2012	Premios Tu Mundo	Best Supporting Actress	Rosalinda Rodríguez	Nominated
2012	Premios Tu Mundo	Best Supporting Actor	Gabriel Valenzuela	Won
2012	Premios Tu Mundo	The Perfect Couple	Karla Monroig and Jorge Luis Pila	Nominated
2012	Premios Tu Mundo	The Best Kiss	Miguel Varoni; Catherine Siachoque; Ximena Duque and David Chocarro	Nominated
2012	Premios Tu Mundo	Great Young Actor	Andrés Cotrino	Nominated
2012	Premios Tu Mundo	Best Novela Soundtrack	La Casa de al Lado opening theme (instrumental)	Nominated
