= Who Killed Sara? =

Mexican television series

- Spanish: ¿Quién mató a Sara?
- Genre: Crime; Thriller; Mystery; Melodrama
- Created by: José Ignacio Valenzuela
- Directed by: David Ruiz; Bernardo de la Rosa
- Starring: Manolo Cardona; Ginés García Millán; Carolina Miranda; Claudia Ramírez; Eugenio Siller; Alejandro Nones
- Composer: David Murillo R.
- Country of origin: Mexico
- Original language: Spanish
- No. of seasons: 3
- No. of episodes: 25

Production
- Executive producers: Alexis Fridman; Juan Uruchurtu; David "Leche" Ruiz; José Ignacio Valenzuela
- Cinematography: Rodrigo Marina; Daniel Jacobs
- Running time: 36–46 minutes
- Production company: Perro Azul

Original release
- Network: Netflix
- Release: 24 March 2021 – 18 May 2022

Who Killed Sara? (Spanish: ¿Quién mató a Sara?) is a Mexican mystery thriller streaming television series created by José Ignacio Valenzuela and produced by Perro Azul, which was released for Netflix on 24 March 2021. The series stars Manolo Cardona as Álex Guzmán, a man convicted for the murder of his sister, a crime that he did not commit. Season 2 premiered on 19 May 2021, two months after the release of the first one. At the end of the Season 2 finale credits, it is revealed that Season 3 is upcoming. Season 3 (the final season) premiered on May 18, 2022 on Netflix.

== Premise ==
The series follows Álex Guzmán, who, after spending 18 years in prison for a crime he did not commit, is hellbent on finding out who killed his sister Sara and getting revenge on the Lazcano family who wronged him.

== Cast ==
- Manolo Cardona as Álex Guzmán, a former convict who decides to avenge the death of his sister Sara, after spending 18 years in prison for a crime he did not commit. As the series progresses, he begins a relationship with Elisa Lazcano.
  - Leo Deluglio as young Álex Guzmán.
- Alejandro Nones as Rodolfo Lazcano, César and Mariana's eldest, and Alex former best friend, who dated Sara prior to her death.
  - Andrés Baida as young Rodolfo Lazcano.
- Ximena Lamadrid as Sara Guzmán, the late younger sister of Álex, whose death is what led to the events of the series. She was in a relationship with Rodolfo Lazcano.
- Carolina Miranda as Elisa Lazcano, César and Mariana's youngest child and only daughter, who decides to help Alex find Sara's true killer, even if she has to expose her family's crimes. As the series progresses, she begins a relationship with Alex.
- Eugenio Siller as José María "Chema" Lazcano, César and Mariana's middle child, and a close friend of Álex, who has an estranged relationship with his family after coming out as gay. He is in a relationship with Lorenzo and the two want to be parents.
  - Polo Morín as young José María Lazcano.
- Fátima Molina as Clara, Chema's close friend, who agrees to help him and Lorenzo have a child by becoming a surrogate mother.
- Ginés García Millán as César Lazcano, a multibillionaire businessman who is the patriarch of the Lazcano family.
- Claudia Ramírez as Mariana Lazcano, the wife of César Lazcano and mother of Rodolfo, José María, and Elisa.
- Juan Carlos Remolina as Sergio Hernández, César best friend and business partner.
- Héctor Jiménez as Elroy, Mariana's adopted son and loyal adviser.
  - Marco Zapata as young Elroy.
- Litzy as Marifer, Sara's best friend and Alex's former lover.
  - Ela Velden as young Marifer.
- Jean Reno as Reinaldo Gómez de la Cortina
- Luis Roberto Guzmán as Lorenzo Rossi, a lawyer who is Chema's boyfriend and wants to raise a child with him.
- Ana Lucía Domínguez as Sofía, Rodolfo's estranged wife.
- Iñaki Godoy as Bruno, Sofia's teenage son and Rodolfo's stepson.

== Episodes ==
=== Season overview ===
Series	Episodes	Originally released
1	10	24 March 2021
2	8	19 May 2021
3	7	18 May 2022

=== Season 1 (2021) ===
No. overall	No. in season	Title	Directed by	Written by	Original release date
1	1	"It Wasn't a Mistake" (No fue un error)	David Ruiz	José Ignacio Valenzuela & Rosario Valenzuela	24 March 2021
A group of teenage friends are drinking alcohol and having fun while cruising along the lake during the early afternoon. Sara Guzman (Ximena Lamadrid) is seen having fun with her brother Alex Guzman (Manolo Cardona), her boyfriend and Alex's best friend Rodolfo Lazcano (Alejandro Nones), Rodolfo's brother Jose Maria "Chema" Lazcano, and Elroy. One of the friends on the boat suggests that Sara parascend above the lake, and Sara takes off on the parachute. The harness securing Sara to the parachute begins to break and Sara panics. Alex realizes Sara's distress and tries to get Rodolfo to stop the boat; however, the intoxicated Rodolfo thinks Sara wants to go faster, so he speeds up the boat instead. The harness breaks and Sara falls to the lake from a great height. The group gets Sara to the hospital in an attempt to save her life, but at the hospital, Sara is declared dead. Alex blames Rodolfo for his actions on the boat. To keep Rodolfo out of legal trouble, Rodolfo's father Cesar Lazcano (Ginés García Millán) persuades Alex to claim to the courts that it was an "accident" that was his fault, but Alex doesn't realize that this will lead to a 30-year prison sentence. The episode continues almost 18 years after Alex Guzman's imprisonment when he is released from jail, and his ultimate revenge plot against the Lazcano family begins. In the present day, the Lazcanos gather at a family owned and operated casino to celebrate Rodolfo's promotion within the family business. Alex hacks into the casino's TV displays and runs a video of himself accusing the Lazcano family of murder and vowing revenge.
2	2	"Bad People" (Gente mala)	David Ruiz	José Ignacio Valenzuela & Rosario Valenzuela	24 March 2021
After the incident that happened at the casino, Cesar Lazcano's decision of whether or not to pursue taking down Alex Guzman causes problems immediately. The youngest Lazcano child, Elisa (Carolina Miranda), is seen perturbed over the revelations about her family and starts to investigate. In a flashback of when Sara Guzman passed away, a young Elisa witnesses an argument between Rodolfo and Chema over Alex's fate. As Elisa follows Rodolfo to the house where Alex lives, an SUV follows right after, and two men emerge from the SUV and begin to shoot the house. The two men enter the house and knock Alex out. Cesar instructs his henchmen to leave Alex alive, with the shooting and beating serving as a warning not to pursue further action against the Lazcano family. After the incident, Elisa enters the house, only to find Alex on the floor bleeding, and sees a plethora of photos of her own family.
3	3	"Love, Sara" (Cariños, Sara)	David Ruiz	José Ignacio Valenzuela & Rosario Valenzuela	24 March 2021
This episode starts with a flashback where Alex is at a party with his sister Sara and their friends. During the party, Sara sees Chema hugging Alex, hinting that Sara may know that Chema is gay. It then cuts back to the present day where Elisa is at Alex's house and they are drinking. Elisa is fishing for answers from Alex to see why he is after her family, reminding him that he can trust her, as Alex does not know that she is also part of the family. While Alex is distracted, Elisa looks around the house for clues. She sees that he hacked her mother's phone to see and hear whatever is going on. The scene quickly changes to Cesar at his casino. He begins walking to a lower part of the casino where it turns out that there is a hidden brothel. Elisa goes to her mother's house and takes her mother's phone without her knowing and puts it in a vase filled with water. The scene changes to Bruno in school. While he is in class, everyone, including him, receives a photo of his family with "murderers" written on it. While Alex is at home, he receives another text from the person known as "Diana the Huntress", saying that Rodolfo is not the killer. Alex, who is still suspicious of this person, asks for proof, and the person replies that they were there and sends a picture of a rusted knife, the same knife that Alex gave Chema 18 years ago. While Mariana is at home, she receives a package that has Chema's knife that she threw in the water 18 years ago. Alex finds Chema, chases him down, and demands that he give him the tapes that he recorded 18 years ago when Sara died. Chema also has a flashback to when Sara finds out that Chema is gay. While Alex is out, Elisa sneaks back into his house to search for more clues. When Alex gets home and sees her, she explains that she just wanted to see him, and the two have sex. Afterwards, Alex reveals to Elisa that he knows her true identity.
4	4	"The Monster in the Family" (El monstruo de la familia)	David Ruiz	José Ignacio Valenzuela	24 March 2021
In a flashback to 18 years ago Alex visits his mom, who is sick, and explains that he is going to prison but only for a short time, and that she will get better. When he gets to court, they find him guilty of murder and he finds out that Cesar lied to him. Rodolfo visits Alex to tell him to leave his stepson, Bruno, out of this, thinking that Alex was the one who sent the photo, but it seems that Alex had no idea about the photo. The scene cuts to Chema at his house grabbing all the tapes and burning them. Rodolfo goes to the casino and heads to the sauna before work and while he is in there he realizes that it is getting hotter and that someone has locked him in. When Elisa gets to Alex's house, he confronts her saying that he knows she is the daughter of Cesar, and she explains that she just wanted to find the truth about her family. Alex says that to gain his trust, she needs to get him a meeting with her dad's accountant. Just as Rodolfo is about to pass out, Elroy opens the door and takes Rodolfo out of the sauna. Elisa was able to get the accountant to meet with Alex. As they were about to meet up, someone runs over and kills the accountant before Alex can talk to him. We find out that the person driving the car is Elroy.
5	5	"Life Insurance" (Seguro de vida)	Bernardo de la Rosa	José Ignacio Valenzuela & Rosario Valenzuela	24 March 2021
In a flashback, young Alex wakes up in a prison hospital bed after being beat up by other prisoners. Another prisoner is by his side and states he will be his fairy godmother. Young Alex asks his lawyer why he's still in prison, and that he needs to go back with his mother. The lawyer regretfully informs Alex that his mother has passed away. At the casino, Elroy is looking worried as he admires a picture of Sara. In a flashback, Cesar shows interest in Sara, and then it shows young Rodolfo and Sara having sex in the back of a car. In the present day, Alex gets saved by Elisa in a narrow encounter with the police and the two go home to have sex. The next morning, Alex starts photocopying Sara's diary and sends Elroy a note with Sara's handwriting. Chema and Lorenzo ask Clara if she's interested in becoming their surrogate mother. Clara excitedly accepts. At the club, Elroy struggles with the fact that he killed the accountant and his hallucinations of Sara. Rodolfo and Sofia argue because she can't get pregnant and she thinks Rodolfo has a problem. Mariana threatens Elroy at the casino after finding out that he told Elisa about Sara's death. That night Alex and Elisa arrive at the casino party and break into César's office to copy his computer files. Bruno looks for Imara and goes to the casino basement. At the casino party, the lights turn off and images of César hunting endangered animals are projected in front of his guests. Suddenly, Elroy shows up with a gun and points it at César but the weapon is turned on himself and he is shot.
6	6	"Hunting" (Cacería)	Bernardo de la Rosa	José Ignacio Valenzuela & Rosario Valenzuela	24 March 2021
In two different flashbacks, Elroy sees Sara having sex with Rodolfo and Cesar. In a different flashback, Elroy leaves his alcoholic father in a burning house and ends up at an orphanage where he meets Mariana. In the present, the Lazcano family is at the casino for a party. Clara goes to the restroom and witnesses Cesar and Sofia engaging in sex. Elroy goes to his office to get a gun and overhears Alex and Elisa in Cesar's office. He plans to shoot Alex but is stopped when he has a hallucination of Sara calling him a coward. Bruno finds Imara in the casino basement but she is unresponsive. Sergio encounters Alex and immediately calls security. Back at the party, Cesar is trying to stop the media from recording or taking pictures of the projected pictures of his hunting trophies. Elroy shows up with the gun and points it to himself. A gunshot goes off as Elroy gets shot by a security guard. In a flashback, Elroy, as a child, crashes his bike into a ladder his mother was standing on, causing his mother to fall to her death. Alex and Cesar see each other and the chase begins as Alex runs to the brothel entrance with Cesar right behind him. Alex comes running out the back door and Chema and Rodolfo tell him they are there to help him. They hurry into the van and escape to the lake house where Sara died. Cesar and his security team arrive at Alex's home and start shooting the place up, destroying his equipment.
7	7	"Fear and Guilt" (El miedo y la culpa)	Bernardo de la Rosa	José Ignacio Valenzuela & Rosario Valenzuela	24 March 2021
Rodolfo, Elisa, Chema, and Alex are at the lake house. Back at the casino, Sergio mentions that Alex must have taken confidential information and suggests that Cesar make a compromise with him. Elisa questions Alex on how far he's going to go to destroy her family, as he has already damaged her father's reputation. They then proceed to have sex, when Alex has a delusion of Sara looking at him while he's being kissed by Elisa. Mariana visits Elroy at the hospital. In a flashback, the prisoner who said he was Alex's fairy godmother shows him a picture of his daughter, Flor, and explains how Cesar killed her. Sergio goes to the basement, physically abuses Imara, and records it. Chema arrives at the lobby of the laboratory and asks Lorenzo for forgiveness. Rodolfo sees Bruno at the casino and asks what he's doing there. Bruno ignores him and continues making his way to the basement. Rodolfo follows him and is shocked to see that it's a brothel. Clara reveals to Chema that Sofia is having an affair with Cesar.
8	8	"Where Dreams Become Reality" (Donde los sueños se hacen realidad)	Bernardo de la Rosa	José Ignacio Valenzuela & Rosario Valenzuela	24 March 2021
In flashbacks, Sara tells Cesar that she's pregnant and discovers a disturbing video of Sergio. Sara manages to escape with the video before Sergio can do anything. Jose Maria and Lorenzo take the next step in the process of in vitro fertilization. Elisa goes to the hospital to find out what Elroy knows about Flor. In another flashback, Sara tells Rodolfo that she's pregnant. Sofia tells Cesar that she's pregnant. Rodolpho confronts Cesar about the casino basement. Moncho, Clara's toxic and obsessive ex-boyfriend, comes to her apartment and attempts to get her to return to him, but she refuses. Lorenzo and Jose Maria announce that they're going to have a baby, which leads to a family argument. Jose Maria reveals that Sofia is cheating on Rodolfo with César.
9	9	"Watch the World Burn" (Ver el mundo arder)	David Ruiz & Bernardo de la Rosa	José Ignacio Valenzuela & Rosario Valenzuela	24 March 2021
Sergio tries to persuade Alex into joining forces to take down Cesar. In a dream, Elisa recalls a disturbing memory. Bruno goes to the casino's basement to look for Imara. Clara continues the in vitro fertilization process with Jose Maria and Lorenzo. Moncho follows Lorenzo and threatens him at his work. Sofia goes to Cesar for help, but he refuses. Rodolfo and Alex meet to discuss Sara's death and Alex lets Rodolfo stay with him. A casino worker approaches Elisa about Imara's death. Elisa confronts Alex about the secrets she's keeping from him. Marifer, Sara's best friend, gives Alex a video Sara left.
10	10	"Two Graves" (Dos tumbas)	David Ruiz & Bernardo de la Rosa	José Ignacio Valenzuela & Rosario Valenzuela	24 March 2021
In a flashback, Elroy tells Mariana that Sara is pregnant, but the baby isn't Rodolfo's. Alex, Marifer, Rodolfo, and Elisa watch the video Sara left, which shows Flor being tortured when she was captive. Elisa goes to the hospital to visit Elroy and ask him what he knows about the deaths of Flor and Imara, but is interrupted by Mariana's arrival. The identity of Diana Casadora is revealed to be Marifer, Sara's best friend. Rodolfo kicks Sofia out of the house and reveals he is sterile after a vasectomy he had done. Lorenzo, frustrated over everything going on with Jose María's family and learning that Clara's ex-boyfriend Moncho is stalking her, breaks up with Jose María and leaves. Elisa confronts Cesar about the casino basement and Sara's death. In another flashback, the events surrounding Sara's death start to come together. It is revealed that after her husband cheated with Sara, Mariana asked Elroy to cut the harness of the parachute. Alex finds Sara's diary and discovers that she was apparently insane, which leads him to find a skeleton buried in his backyard.

=== Season 2 (2021) ===
No. overall	No. in season	Title	Directed by	Written by	Original release date
11	1	"The Two Faces of Sara" (Las dos caras de Sara)	David Ruiz	José Ignacio Valenzuela & Rosario Valenzuela	19 May 2021
The corpse found in the backyard threatens to put Alex back in jail. To prove his innocence, he looks for answers with a psychiatrist who treated Sara.
12	2	"Blood on Their Hands" (Sangre en las manos)	David Ruiz	José Ignacio Valenzuela & Rosario Valenzuela	19 May 2021
Lorenzo agrees to be Alex's lawyer. Mariana decides what to do with Elroy. Elisa becomes collateral damage in one of Alex's attacks against Cesar.
13	3	"Collapse" (Derrumbe)	David Ruiz	José Ignacio Valenzuela & Rosario Valenzuela	19 May 2021
Alex's obsession with revenge prompts Elisa to make a choice. Moncho breaks into Chema and Lorenzo's house. Sara learns a shocking truth about herself.
14	4	"It's All on You" (Todo queda en tus manos)	David Ruiz	José Ignacio Valenzuela & Rosario Valenzuela	19 May 2021
Six months later, Alex discovers the identity of the corpse in his backyard. Meanwhile, Cesar has disappeared and Elisa comes back from Europe.
15	5	"The Dead Speak" (Los muertos hablan)	David Ruiz	José Ignacio Valenzuela & Rosario Valenzuela	19 May 2021
Alex helps Lorenzo and Chema with the aftermath of what happened at their house. Sergio targets Elisa to hurt Cesar. Nicandro meets up with Marifer.
16	6	"This Is Personal" (Esto es personal)	David Ruiz	José Ignacio Valenzuela & Rosario Valenzuela	19 May 2021
An officer shows up at Lorenzo's office to inquire about Moncho. Marifer discloses her plan to find her mom to Nicandro. Alex focuses on finding Elisa.
17	7	"We Were Never Friends" (Nunca fuimos amigos)	David Ruiz	José Ignacio Valenzuela & Rosario Valenzuela	19 May 2021
Flashbacks reveal Sara and Marifer's connection. Moncho's brother exacts his revenge. Nicandro hands Alex the ultimate proof of Sara's double life.
18	8	"I Killed Sara" (Yo maté a Sara)	David Ruiz	José Ignacio Valenzuela & Rosario Valenzuela	19 May 2021
A videotape hidden in Sara's closet becomes a key piece of evidence that makes everyone realize they've been seeking the murderer in the wrong place.

=== Season 3 (2022) ===
No. overall	No. in season	Title	Directed by	Written by	Original release date
19	1	"Presumed dead" (Presunción de muerte)	David Ruiz	José Ignacio Valenzuela & Rosario Valenzuela	18 May 2022
While investigating the link between Nicandro and Dr. Alanis, Alex uncovers a key suspect. Rodolfo asks Alex to help him bring his father to justice. The episode begins with Alex and Elisa having a passionate sexual session until they're called by the nurse to the hospital to investigate.
20	2	"Medusa Complex" (Complejo de Medusa)	David Ruiz	José Ignacio Valenzuela & Rosario Valenzuela	18 May 2022
Sara tells Nicardro's dad about his son's drug business. Reinaldo offers Marifer a deal. Alex secures protection for Chema. Nicandro visits Daniela.
21	3	"Dead or Alive" (Viva o muerta)	David Ruiz	José Ignacio Valenzuela & Rosario Valenzuela	18 May 2022
Lucía's arrival takes Álex's investigation in another direction. A new lawyer takes Chema's case. César shows up at Álex's house to reclaim his money.
22	4	"Welcome to the Medusa Center" (Bienvenidos al Centro Medusa)	David Ruiz	José Ignacio Valenzuela & Rosario Valenzuela	18 May 2022
Álex fights for his life in the hospital. A distressed Chema asks his mom for help. A flashback shows how Sara became the focus of Reinaldo's experiment.
23	5	"Lab Rats" (Ratones de laboratorio)	David Ruiz	José Ignacio Valenzuela & Rosario Valenzuela	18 May 2022
Worried about her treatment, Sara attempts to expose Reinaldo. Chema is admitted to the Medusa Center. César reveals crucial information to Álex.
24	6	"What Happened to Sara" (Qué pasó con Sara)	David Ruiz	José Ignacio Valenzuela & Rosario Valenzuela	18 May 2022
César pays a visit to Tonya and resorts to a drastic method to get information about Sara. Under Reinaldo's watch, Chema undergoes horrifying treatment.
25	7	"What Did You Do, Sara" (¿Qué hiciste, Sara?)	David Ruiz	José Ignacio Valenzuela & Rosario Valenzuela	18 May 2022
When the truth of what happened to Sara is finally exposed, Alex unleashed one last act of revenge on the Medusa Center.

== Production ==
Who Killed Sara? was produced by Perro Azul for Netflix. The studio Perro Azul has their headquarters in Mexico City and is part of Netflix's Latin America offices.

Created by José Ignacio Valenzuela, the episodes of the first and second season were directed by David Ruiz and Bernardo de la Rosa. José Ignacio Valenzuela, Alexis Fridman, and Juan Uruchurtu (from Perro Azul) were also in charge of the production.

According to Eugenio Siller, the production gave the actors the liberty to add to the personalities of their characters.

The first and second season were filmed consecutively under strict safety guidelines due to the COVID-19 pandemic. Each city in Mexico has their own safety guidelines and the production moved around from city to city that allowed them to film, such as Mexico City, Guadalajara, and Puebla. Shooting locations also include Acapulco and Valle de Bravo (Lake Avándaro).

== Release ==
The 10-episode first season premiered on Netflix on 24 March 2021. The second season premiered on 19 May 2021. It features the incorporation of Matías Novoa, Daniel Giménez Cacho, and Antonio de la Vega into the ensemble cast. The third and final season released on May 18, 2022.

== Reception ==
=== Viewership ===
Upon its release, Who Killed Sara? claimed the number one spot for the most-streamed show for several weeks in the United States. On 21 April 2021, Netflix reported that the series has been seen by 55 million households during its first 28 days and went to become the most viewed foreign language show.

Until March 2023, the show ranked #10 in the Netflix all-time hours watched list for Non-English TV with 266.43 million hours watched globally in the first 28 days.

=== Critical response ===
The series receive positive reviews from critics. On Rotten Tomatoes, the first season has an approval rating of 86% based on 7 reviews.

Joel Keller of Decider, praised the series and recommends people stream it. He commented "has a few logic problems, but its overall vibe is energetic enough, with good performances, to keep viewers' attention". Daniel Hart from Ready Steady Cut, considered the show "a compelling, revenge-thirsty murder mystery". Mikel Zorrilla from Espinof considered the series "an entertaining thriller with the soul of a telenovela that mixes mystery, drama and eroticism." Ángel S. Harguindey wrote in an article that "subscription television has allowed Mexican soap operas to thrive in their expanded themes and this series is luxurious and liberal."

== Accolades ==
Year	Award	Category	Nominee(s)	Result	Ref.
2022	30th Actors and Actresses Union Awards	Best Actor in an International Production	Ginés García Millán	Won	
