= Dueños del paraíso =

- Genre: Telenovela
- Created by: Pablo Illanes
- Written by: Gisela Labrada; Carmina Narro; Sandra Velasco
- Directed by: Lilo Vilaplana; Nicolás Di Blasi; Leonardo Galavis; Víctor Huerta
- Creative director: Valeria Fiñana
- Starring: Kate del Castillo; Adriana Barraza; Jorge Zabaleta; José María Torre; Miguel Varoni; Guillermo Quintanilla; Alberto Jiménez; Ximena Duque; Tony Dalton; Sofía Lama
- Music by: Alexis Estiz; Alberto Slezynger
- Opening theme: "Dueños del paraíso" by Lucía Adúriz Bravo
- Countries of origin: Chile; United States
- Original language: Spanish
- No. of seasons: 1
- No. of episodes: 69

Production
- Executive producers: Joshua Mintz; Gemma Lombardi; David Posada
- Producers: Ernesto Cabrera; Rafael Villasmil
- Cinematography: Miguel Font; José Luis Velarde
- Editor: Hader Antivar Duque
- Camera setup: Multi-camera
- Production companies: Telemundo Studios; Televisión Nacional de Chile

Original release
- Network: Telemundo
- Release: January 13 – April 20, 2015

Dueños del paraíso (English: Owners of Paradise), is a 2015 Spanish-language telenovela produced by United States–based television network Telemundo Studios, Miami in co-production by Chile-based television network TVN. The telenovela is inspired by the drug trade of Miami in the 1970s.

It starred Kate del Castillo as Anastasia Cardona, and Jorge Zabaleta and José María Torre as the main protagonists.

== Plot ==
Following difficult life events and husband's betrayal, Anastasia Cardona (Kate del Castillo) gets involved into illegal business activities. Driven by thirst for power, Anastasia stops at nothing to defeat her enemies, endure trials of betrayal, and the impossibility of living a life with true love.

== Cast ==
=== Main ===
- Kate del Castillo as Anastasia Cardona
- Adriana Barraza as Irene Medrano
- Jorge Zabaleta as Conrado San Miguel
- José María Torre as Adán Romero
- Miguel Varoni as Leandro Quezada
- Guillermo Quintanilla as Nataniel Cardona
- Alberto Jiménez as Salvador Ferrara
- Ximena Duque as Erika San Miguel
- Tony Dalton as Renato Maldonado
- Sofía Lama as Silvana Cardona
- Tiago Correa as Mario Alejandro Esparza
- Juan Pablo Llano as Ignacio Elizondo
- Géraldine Bazán as Verónica Romero
- Margarita Muñoz as Gina Bianchi
- María Luisa Flores as Paola Quezada
- Pepe Gámez as Elías Cardona
- Ariel Texido as Mauricio Riquelme
- Jorge Hernández as Saúl Benavides
- Andrea López as Analía Menchaca de Esparza
- Gabriel Valenzuela as José Carlos Quezada
- Maxi Iglesias as Chad Mendoza
- Alberto Mateo as Sergio Di Franco
- Daniela Wong as Luciana Romero
- Yuly Ferreira as Daisy Muñoz
- Dayana Garroz as Rita Corona
- Ana Osorio as Daytona Durán
- Beatriz Monroy as Modesta Flores
- Rachel Vallori as Vaitiare Santos
- Adrián Mas as Leobardo Gonzalvez
- María Elena Swett as Vanessa Esparza

=== Recurring ===
- Jamie Sasson as Isabel Cordoba

== Audience ==
In the United States the series was released on 13 January 2015, with 3 million viewers. In Chile it scored 7.8 rating points.

== Episodes ==
No.	Title	Original release date
1	"Los hombres de Leandro Quezada violan a Anastasia"	January 13, 2015
2	"Anastasia y Nataniel sufren otro atentado en Miami"	January 14, 2015
3	"Anastasia le ordena a Renato matar a los violadores"	January 15, 2015
4	"Anastasia descubre a Nataniel besándose con Gina"	January 16, 2015
5	"Anastasia Cardona mata a Nataniel"	January 19, 2015
6	"Anastasia culpa a Quezada de la muerte de Nataniel"	January 20, 2015
7	"Anastasia finge dolor por el asesinato de su esposo"	January 21, 2015
8	"Anastasia confiesa que mató a su esposo"	January 23, 2015
9	"Anastasia es secuestrada"	January 23, 2015
10	"Anastasia se burla de Elizondo por mentiroso"	January 26, 2015
11	"Anastasia enfrenta a los hijos de Nataniel"	January 27, 2015
12	"Leandro llama a Anastasia y la amenaza de muerte"	January 28, 2015
13	"Conrado intenta acercarse a Anastasia"	January 29, 2015
14	"Anastasia se enfrenta a Leandro"	January 30, 2015
15	"Anastasia intenta escapar de Leandro Quezada"	February 2, 2015
16	"Quezada lanza a Anastasia a los cocodrilos"	February 3, 2015
17	"Anastasia es rescatada por unos pescadores"	February 4, 2015
18	"Anastasia se debate entre la vida y la muerte"	February 5, 2015
19	"Anastasia es atacada por un sicario de Quezada"	February 6, 2015
20	"Anastasia y Conrado se besan"	February 9, 2015
21	"Anastasia acorrala a Leandro Quezada"	February 10, 2015
22	"Anastasia no puede ocultar su atracción por Conrado"	February 11, 2015
23	"Anastasia le prohibe a Irene meterse con Renato"	February 12, 2015
24	"Anastasia le dispara a Leandro"	February 13, 2015
25	"Anastasia y Conrado intentan hacer el amor"	February 16, 2015
26	"Anastasia le quita el hijo a Gina"	February 17, 2015
27	"Anastasia se hace cargo del bebé de Gina"	February 18, 2015
28	"Anastasia se asocia con Benavides"	February 19, 2015
29	"Conrado le dice a Anastasia que está enamorado de ella"	February 20, 2015
30	"Anastasia revela la traición de Verónica"	February 23, 2015
31	"Anastasia le propone un negocio a Sergio"	February 24, 2015
32	"Elías interroga a Anastasia sobre Gina"	February 25, 2015
33	"Anastasia y Conrado hacen el amor"	February 26, 2015
34	"Anastasia descubre el secreto de Irene"	February 27, 2015
35	"La policía incauta el cargamento de Anastasia"	March 2, 2015
36	"Anastasia consuela a Conrado"	March 3, 2015
37	"Conrado y Anastasia se van de Miami"	March 4, 2015
38	"Conrado le dice a Anastasia que adopte al bebé"	March 5, 2015
39	"Anastasia se roba el hijo de Gina"	March 6, 2015
40	"Anastasia es víctima de un atentado"	March 9, 2015
41	"Anastasia descubre la mentira de Conrado"	March 10, 2015
42	"Anastasia decide irse para Colombia"	March 11, 2015
43	"Anastasia descubre la traición de Elías"	March 12, 2015
44	"Anastasia quiere ajustar cuentas con Elías"	March 14, 2015
45	"Anastasia negocia con los colombianos"	March 16, 2015
46	"Adán y Anastasia buscan un nuevo proveedor de coca"	March 17, 2015
47	"Conrado y Anastasia son amenazados por Leandro"	March 18, 2015
48	"Renato se confiesa ante Anastasia"	March 19, 2015
49	"Anastasia se entera de la infidelidad de Conrado"	March 20, 2015
50	"Conrado le miente a Anastasia"	March 23, 2015
51	"Irene le dice a Anastasia que olvide a Conrado"	March 24, 2015
52	"Anastasia echa de su casa a Irene"	March 25, 2015
53	"Anastasia enfurece al saber que secuestraron al bebé"	March 26, 2015
54	"Irene le dice a Anastasia que saque del camino a Erica"	March 27, 2015
55	"Anastasia planea su venganza contra Elizondo"	March 30, 2015
56	"Anastasia le dispara a Elizondo"	March 31, 2015
57	"Anastasia es traicionada por Conrado"	April 1, 2015
58	"Renato sufre por la señora Anastasia"	April 2, 2015
59	"Anastasia le dice a Renato que ella ama a Conrado"	April 6, 2015
60	"Conrado le dice a Anastasia que quiere a Erica"	April 7, 2015
61	"Anastasia rechaza las mentiras de Conrado"	April 8, 2015
62	"Irene encuentra a Anastasia inconsciente"	April 9, 2015
63	"Anastasia golpea a Paola"	April 10, 2015
64	"Anastasia se entera de que Bob mató a Verónica"	April 13, 2015
65	"Anastasia le dice a Adán quién mató a Vero"	April 14, 2015
66	"Anastasia y Ferrara tuvieron una relación"	April 15, 2015
67	"Ferrara y Anastasia confiesan sus sentimientos"	April 16, 2015
68	"Leandro ordena quemar a Anastasia"	April 17, 2015
69	"Anastasia y Renato se reencuentran"	April 20, 2015

== Broadcast ==
The series originally aired from January 13, 2015, to April 20, 2015, in United States on Telemundo. The series aired in Chile on Televisión Nacional de Chile from January 19, 2015, until June 9, 2015. In summer of 2015 the telenovela was made available to stream in the United States on the streaming service Netflix, along with a handful of Telemundo programs.

The English subtitles on Netflix were provided by Husna Manzar.
