= El fantasma de Elena =

- Also known as: Un amor que va más allá
- Created by: Humberto Kico Olivieri
- Developed by: Telemundo Studios, Miami
- Directed by: David Posada; Nicolás Di Blasi; Ricardo Schwarz
- Starring: Elizabeth Gutiérrez; Segundo Cernadas; Ana Layevska; Fabián Ríos
- Theme music composer: Patricia Manterola
- Opening theme: "Y Llegarás" by Patricia Manterola
- Country of origin: United States
- Original language: Spanish
- No. of episodes: 117

Production
- Executive producer: Aurelio Valcárcel Carroll
- Producer: Jairo Arcila
- Production location: Miami
- Editor: Ramiro Pardo - Hader Antivar Duque
- Camera setup: Multi-camera
- Running time: 42 minutes

Original release
- Network: Telemundo
- Release: July 20, 2010 – January 7, 2011

Related
- Perro amor; Los herederos del Monte; Julia (1983)

El Fantasma de Elena (Elena's Ghost) is a Spanish-language telenovela produced by the American television network Telemundo. It is a remake of the 1983 Venezuelan telenovela Julia. The telenovela ran for 117 episodes from July 20, 2010 to January 7, 2011. It was broadcast with English translation subtitles in CC3.

It stars Elizabeth Gutiérrez and Segundo Cernadas as protagonists and Ana Layevska as the main antagonist in a double role (Elena and Daniela).

== Plot ==
Elena Lafé (Elizabeth Gutiérrez) is a young, beautiful, and talented horse rider. She and her widowed father, Tomás (Braulio Castillo), manage a small but excellent hotel on the Key West ocean shore. Raised in her father’s shadow and kept away from the maternal side of her family, Elena has never known true love. That is until she finds Eduardo Girón (Segundo Cernadas), a widower, unconscious in the middle of the forest. She takes him to her father's hotel and falls hopelessly in love with Eduardo as she nurses him back to health.

The rich, young businessman reciprocates her love and they marry in an impromptu ceremony on the beach. Elena Lafé and her best friend Laura (Wanda D'Isidoro) move into Eduardo’s mansion, where he lives with several family members and household staff. The new bride is not given the warmest of welcomes by Eduardo's relatives. Her unease turns to terror when she keeps hearing screams and moans from the mansion’s tower.

Elena Lafé sees a photograph of Eduardo’s deceased wife, also named Elena. Elena Lafé learns from Corina (Maritza Bustamante) about the relationship Eduardo had with Elena Calcaño (Ana Layevska), who committed suicide. Elena Calcaño had a twin sister, Daniela (also played by Ana Layevska), who went mad after Elena Calcaño's death. Elena Lafé also discovers that her husband and his brothers belong to a mythical race that hides many secrets and conspiracies.

Elena Lafé becomes involved in a series of supernatural and personal conflicts involving a ghost, a witch, Eduardo’s half-brother, and a twin sister who intends to kill her. As she investigates the events surrounding her, Elena uncovers secrets about her family and her past, eventually learning the truth behind the ghost known as Elena’s Ghost.

== Cast ==
=== Main ===
Actor	Character
Elizabeth Gutiérrez	Elena Lafé
Segundo Cernadas	Eduardo Girón
Ana Layevska	Elena Calcaño; Daniela Calcaño
Fabián Ríos	Montecristo Palacios
Maritza Bustamante	Corina Santander
Carlos Montilla	Darío Girón
Elluz Peraza	Antonia "Latoña" Sulbarán
Katie Barberi	Rebeca Santander de Girón
Zully Montero	Margót Uzcátegui; Ruth Merchán "La Reina"

=== Recurring ===
Actor	Character
Jéssica Mas	Dulce Uzcátegui
Henry Zakka	Alan Martin
Eva Tamargo	Mariela Lafé
Braulio Castillo	Tomás Lafé
Gerardo Riverón	Samuel
Adrián Carvajal	Benjamín Girón
Marisol Calero	Nena Ochoa
Freddy Víquez	Anacleto / Said
Juan Pablo Llano	Walter
Víctor Corona	Kalima
Beatriz Monroy	Jesusa
Wanda D'Isidoro	Laura Luna
Liannet Borrego	Milady Margarita
Michelle Jones	Gandica
Yuly Ferreira	Sandra
Leslie Stewart	Victoria "Vicky" Ortega
Isabella Castillo	Andrea Girón
Mauricio Hénao	Michel
Alexandra Pomales	Lucia
Alex Rosguer	Lázar
Ana Paula Apollonio	Nurse
Anabel Leal	Berta
Andres Mistage	Octavio
Anies Castillo	
Antonio Rodriguez Garòfalo	Tony
Ariel Texido	Tulio Peñaloza
Cristian Daniel Felipez	Jacinto
Dianelys Brito	Sister Teresa
Ernesto Tapia	Pancho
Fernando Sanchez	Romulo
Hector Alejandro	José Carlos del Pino
Hector Contreras	Paramedic
Hely Ferrigny	Montecristo's lawye
Hernando Visbal	Jailer
Hilda Luna	Cristina
Gualberto González	Israel
Janelys Izquierdo	Celadora
Juan Cepero	Dr. Lorenzo Tapia
Johnny Nessy	Rambo
Karen García	Clara Bertuol Mayerston
Jorge Hernandez	El Greco
Jorge Armando Cardenas	Desama
Jose Xavier Roman	Romy
Juan David Ferrer	Dr. Roland
Lino Martone	Ramiro Sanchez Quejada
Lyduan Gonzalez	Tobías
Luke Grande	Barman
Manny Sanz	Paramedic
Maria Pretelt	Julia
Marina Catalán	La Gorda
Morella Silva	Butterfly
Nicolas Teran	Lazaro
Nini Vásquez	Maoli
Nury Flores	Felipa Chaparro
Omar Santana	Macaco
Orfelina de León	Nurse
Óscar Díaz	Doctor
Peter John Aranguren	Actor
Raquel Rojas	Enfermera
Rayner Garranchan	Cristian
Reinaldo Cruz	Mauricio Verti
Shafik Palis	Eduardito Girón
Silvia Del Monico	Dr. Bracho
Tely Ganas	Irina
Vanessa González	Leonor

== United States broadcast ==
- Release dates, episode name & length, and U.S. viewers based on Telemundo's broadcast.

Air Date	Number	Episode Title	Rating	Duration
20.07.2010	001	Lanzamiento de tragedias	5.5	43 minutes
21.07.2010	002	Besos de revancha	5.7	43 minutes
22.07.2010	003	Fantasmas del pasado	5.8	43 minutes
23.07.2010	004	Amor desconocido	5.4	43 minutes
26.07.2010	005	Fantasmas del pasado	5.3	43 minutes
27.07.2010	006	Intenciones sospechosas	5.1	43 minutes
28.07.2010	007	Pasaje de brujería	N/A	43 minutes
29.07.2010	008	Brujería de engaño	N/A	43 minutes
30.07.2010	009	Pasiones reprimidas	N/A	43 minutes
02.08.2010	010	Locura desmedida	N/A	43 minutes
03.08.2010	011	Pelea de manos	3.4	43 minutes
04.08.2010	012	Instintos de brujería	3.8	43 minutes
05.08.2010	013	Rival mortal	4.1	43 minutes
06.08.2010	014	El Fantasma de Elena	N/A	43 minutes
09.08.2010	015	Herederos Girón	N/A	43 minutes
10.08.2010	016	Huellas gemelas	N/A	43 minutes
11.08.2010	017	Negocios turbios	N/A	43 minutes
12.08.2010	018	Herencia en juego	N/A	43 minutes
13.08.2010	019	Herencia de discordia	N/A	43 minutes
16.08.2010	020	Juegos de fantasma	N/A	43 minutes
17.08.2010	021	Herencia de discordia	N/A	43 minutes
18.08.2010	022	Guerra bestial	N/A	43 minutes
19.08.2010	023	Alianzas de maldad	N/A	43 minutes
20.08.2010	024	Horencia de fantasmas	3.7	43 minutes
24.08.2010	025	Revelaciones peligrosas	N/A	43 minutes
25.08.2010	026	Mujer de discordia	N/A	43 minutes
26.08.2010	027	Accidente definitivo	N/A	43 minutes
27.08.2010	028	Dudas de muerte	N/A	43 minutes
30.08.2010	029	Víctimas del pasado	N/A	43 minutes
31.08.2010	030	Dudas asesinas	N/A	43 minutes
01.09.2010	031	Locura obsesiva	N/A	43 minutes
02.09.2010	032	Lugares robados	N/A	43 minutes
03.09.2010	033	Locura psicótica	N/A	43 minutes
06.09.2010	034	Quemar culpas	N/A	43 minutes
07.09.2010	035	Pasado que duele	N/A	43 minutes
08.09.2010	036	Guerra oculta	N/A	43 minutes
09.09.2010	037	Venganza por despecho	N/A	43 minutes
10.09.2010	038	Guerra por amor	N/A	43 minutes
13.09.2010	039	Petición de mano	N/A	43 minutes
14.09.2010	040	Humillación de sangre	N/A	43 minutes
15.09.2010	041	Celos, malditos celos	N/A	43 minutes
16.09.2010	042	Pactos de venganza	N/A	43 minutes
17.09.2010	043	Comienzo de venganza	N/A	43 minutes
20.09.2010	044	Golpes contundentes	N/A	43 minutes
21.09.2010	045	Destino marcado	4.2	43 minutes
22.09.2010	046	Aliados equivocados	N/A	43 minutes
23.09.2010	047	Herencia de venganza	N/A	43 minutes
24.09.2010	048	Embarazo psicológico	N/A	43 minutes
27.09.2010	049	Juego doble	N/A	43 minutes
28.09.2010	050	Madres de mentira	N/A	43 minutes
29.09.2010	051	Noticias mortales	N/A	43 minutes
30.09.2010	052	Romper el hielo	N/A	43 minutes
01.10.2010	053	Fuerza maternal	N/A	43 minutes
04.10.2010	054	Sin palabras	N/A	43 minutes
05.10.2010	055	Intenciones negras	N/A	43 minutes
06.10.2010	056	Dudas mortales	N/A	43 minutes
07.10.2010	057	Fortuna de discordia	N/A	43 minutes
08.10.2010	058	Duelo de honor	N/A	43 minutes
11.10.2010	059	Alerta de desgracias	N/A	43 minutes
12.10.2010	060	Silencio riesgoso	N/A	43 minutes
13.10.2010	061	Amor negado	N/A	43 minutes
15.10.2010	062	Malos pagos	N/A	43 minutes
18.10.2010	063	Tratos fracasados	N/A	43 minutes
19.10.2010	064	Padres en duda	N/A	43 minutes
20.10.2010	065	Robo de venganza	N/A	43 minutes
21.10.2010	066	Derechos por amor	N/A	43 minutes
22.10.2010	067	Perder el rumbo	N/A	43 minutes
25.10.2010	068	Retar la suerte	N/A	43 minutes
26.10.2010	069	Fortuna mortal	N/A	43 minutes
28.10.2010	070	Dolor que consume	N/A	43 minutes
01.11.2010	071	Prueba de paternidad	4.1	43 minutes
02.11.2010	072	Peligro cercano	4.4	43 minutes
03.11.2010	073	Memoria peligrosa	4.0	43 minutes
04.11.2010	074	Encuentro de mágico	4.8	43 minutes
05.11.2010	075	Fantasmas que vuelven	4.1	43 minutes
08.11.2010	076	Corazón atado	4.1	43 minutes
09.11.2010	077	Fantasma de miedo	4.6	43 minutes
10.11.2010	078	Venganza sensual	4.3	43 minutes
11.11.2010	079	Tortura de pecados	4.0	43 minutes
12.11.2010	080	Aliados anónimos	4.3	43 minutes
15.11.2010	081	Peligro latente	4.4	43 minutes
16.11.2010	082	Boda amarga	4.7	43 minutes
17.11.2010	083	Premio de memoria	4.7	43 minutes
18.11.2010	084	Carta de salvación	N/A	43 minutes
19.11.2010	085	Trampa efectiva	N/A	43 minutes
22.11.2010	086	Corazón arrepentido	N/A	43 minutes
23.11.2010	087	Memoria de traiciones	N/A	43 minutes
24.11.2010	088	Hilos mortales	N/A	43 minutes
26.11.2010	089	Alianza rota	N/A	43 minutes
29.11.2010	090	Rival de hierro	N/A	43 minutes
30.11.2010	091	Sorpresas vitales	N/A	43 minutes
01.12.2010	092	Perdón mortal	4.7	43 minutes
02.12.2010	093	Amenaza futura	N/A	43 minutes
03.12.2010	094	Deseos compartidos	N/A	43 minutes
06.12.2010	095	Noticia impactante	4.4	43 minutes
07.12.2010	096	Justicia propia	4.3	43 minutes
08.12.2010	097	Venganza definitiva	4.3	43 minutes
09.12.2010	098	Pesadilla de libertad	4.0	43 minutes
10.12.2010	099	Sentencia de muerte	3.6	43 minutes
13.12.2010	100	Promesa peligrosa	N/A	43 minutes
14.12.2010	101	Rastros perdidos	N/A	43 minutes
15.12.2010	102	Amenaza de entrega	N/A	43 minutes
16.12.2010	103	Amenaza de bomba	N/A	43 minutes
17.12.2010	104	Amenaza de muerte	N/A	43 minutes
20.12.2010	105	Bomba de aliados	N/A	43 minutes
21.12.2010	106	Delitos vigentes	N/A	43 minutes
22.12.2010	107	Venganza sin limite	N/A	43 minutes
23.12.2010	108	Peligro perfecto	N/A	43 minutes
27.12.2010	109	Deudas por cobrar	4.3	43 minutes
28.12.2010	110	Reencuentro de amor	5.1	43 minutes
29.12.2010	111	Cobrando cuentas	4.5	43 minutes
30.12.2010	112	Juegos peligrosos	N/A	43 minutes
03.01.2011	113	Pagando culpas	4.5	43 minutes
04.01.2011	114	Esperanza de amor	4.9	43 minutes
05.01.2011	115	Golpe final	4.8	43 minutes
06.01.2011	116	Sentencia cruel	5.7	43 minutes
07.01.2011	117	Gran final	N/A	43 minutes
