= Ximena Duque =

Colombian actress and model and a star

- Ximena Duque in 2015
- Born: Ximena Duque Giraldo; January 30, 1985 (age 41); Santiago de Cali, Colombia
- Occupation: Actress
- Years active: 2005–present
- Spouse: Jay Adkins (m. 2017)
- Partner: Carlos Ponce (2010–2016)
- Children: 3

Ximena Duque (born January 30, 1985) is a Colombian actress.

== Biography ==
Ximena was born in Cali, Valle del Cauca, Colombia, on January 30, 1985, and moved to Miami, Florida at age twelve, where she began to study acting, diction and accent neutralization.

== Career ==
=== 2002–2009: Beginnings ===
Ximena got her start on the show Protagonistas de Novela, a reality show dedicated to seeking acting talents. In 2005, she began her acting career in the telenovela Soñar no Cuesta Nada, where she played the character Jenny. In 2007, she participated in Pecados Ajenos as María Águilar. The next year, she became a part of the telenovela Valeria playing Ana Lucía Hidalgo. She was also part of the cast of the telenovela El Rostro de Analía, where she shared credits with Elizabeth Gutiérrez. In 2009, she had a minor role in the telenovela Victorinos. Throughout the years, Ximena Duque has acted in several telenovelas with Telemundo.

=== 2010–present: New projects ===
In 2010, she starred in the telenovela Bella calamidades, a new version of the Cinderella Story. That same year, she also formed part of the cast of the telenovela Alguien te mira, a remake of a Chilean telenovela, wherein she co-starred with David Chocarro and Géraldine Bazán. In 2011, she worked for the Univision television network, where she joined the cast of the telenovela Sacrificio de Mujer. During that same year, she had a lead role with Telemundo as Carola Conde joining the cast of La casa de al lado, in which Gabriel Porras and David Chocarro were the lead villains. In 2012, she obtained her second lead role in the telenovela Corazón valiente, with Adriana Fonseca and Fabián Ríos. Through her role in this telenovela, she obtained two awards including "The Perfect Couple" and "The Richest Kiss", which she shared with Fabian Rios. In 2013, she starred in the telenovela Santa Diabla, as the main antagonist, and in 2014 won an award for "The Best Bad Girl" in Premios Tu Mundo. In that same year participated in the Web Novela Mía Mundo.

In late August 2014, actor David Chocarro, published on his Twitter account a picture next to Ximena, recording the web where they appear novela Villa paraíso, in which she is the protagonist. Ximena also talked a bit about her character in the telenovela that will air on Telemundo's channel:

I love my character, I actually tell a story. It turns out that I wanted to change because the fans wanted it back asked me to be blonde, then I took a few "high lights" (lights in her hair), and finally I put all blonde but I did not like, because I saw the character in the telenovela mini and it is a humble woman studying. I mean, I had nothing to do with the look that I had done with the character and I had to switch back, because I start recording

— Ximena Duque

When she had finished the recordings of this telenovela, Duque ended her contract with Telemundo telenovela Dueños del paraíso, which was released in 2015, confirming that the actress would move to Hollywood with Carlos Ponce, to start working in new movies and TV series. She then participated in 9 episodes of the popular soap opera Days of Our Lives as Blanca. She later rejoined Telemundo and starred in ¿Quién es quién? as Clarita for 2 episodes. In 2017 she had her seventh lead role in La Fan as Adriana Zubizarreta.

== Personal life ==
Duque became romantically involved with actor Christian Carabias when both took part in Protagonistas de Novela 2, a reality show competition in which the contestants lived in a common house. Their romance was a major storyline until one of them was eliminated from the competition. Their son Christian Carabias Duque was born a year later, on May 16, 2004.

From 2010 to 2016 she was in a relationship with actor Carlos Ponce.

In December 2016, Duque became engaged to Florida businessman Jay Adkins. The couple married in June 2017. Their daughter, Luna Adkins Duque, was born on January 14, 2018. On February 06, 2021, their second daughter born, Skye Adkins.

== Filmography ==
=== Films ===
Year	Title	Character	Notes
2014	Primero de enero	Carmen	Debut film
2015	Morir soñando	Isabela	

=== Television ===
Year	Title	Character	Notes
2002-2003	Gata Salvaje	Student	Cameo role
2005	Soñar no cuesta nada	Jenny	Recurring role
2007	Pecados Ajenos	María Aguilar	Recurring role
2008	Valeria	Ana Lucía Hidalgo	Recurring role
2008	El Rostro de Analía	Camila Moncada	Recurring role
2009	Victorinos	Diana Gallardo	Recurring role
2010	Bella calamidades	Angelina	Recurring role
2010	Alguien te mira	Camila Wood	Recurring role
2011	Sacrificio de mujer	Maria Gracia Exposito	Recurring role
2011	La casa de al lado	Carola Conde	Lead Role
2012	Corazón valiente	Samantha Sandoval Valdez Navarro	Main Protagonist
2013–14	Santa Diabla	Inés Robledo	Main Antagonist
2014	Villa paraíso	Cristina Vidal	Main Protagonist
2015	Dueños del paraíso	Érica San Miguel	Main Protagonist
2016	Clarita	Clarita	Lead role
2016	¿Quién es quién?	Clarita	2 episodes
2016	Days of Our Lives	Blanca	9 episodes
2017	La fan	Adriana Zubizarreta	Main Protagonist
2017	Queen of the South	Eva Buemeros	Main Cast
2017	Milagros de Navidad	Lucía Rodríguez	3 episodes: "No lo deporten" Lead Role

=== Web ===
Year	Title	Character	Notes
2013	Mía Mundo	Alex	Recurring role

== Awards and nominations ==
Year	Award	Category	Nominated	Result
2012	Premios People en Español	Best Supporting Actress	Corazón valiente	Nominated
2012	Premios People en Español	Best Couple (with Fabián Ríos)	Corazón valiente	Nominated
2012	Premios Tu Mundo	The Perfect Couple (with Fabián Ríos)	Corazón valiente	Won
2012	Premios Tu Mundo	The Best Kiss (with Fabián Ríos)	Corazón valiente	Won
2013	Miami Life Awards	Best Female Lead of telenovela	Corazón valiente	Nominated
2013	Premios Tu Mundo	#MásSocial (with Fabián Ríos)	Herself	Nominated
2014	Premios Tu Mundo	The Best Bad Girl	Santa Diabla	Won
2014	Premios Tu Mundo	Soy Sexy and I know it	Herself	Won
2015	Premios Tu Mundo	Best Supporting Actress - Super series	Dueños del paraíso	Nominated
