= Henry Zakka =

Venezuelan actor and director (born 1956)

- Born: July 29, 1956 (age 70); Caracas, Venezuela
- Occupations: Actor, director
- Years active: 1979–present
- Spouse: Grecia Colmenares

Henry Zakka (born July 29, 1956, Caracas, Venezuela) is a Venezuelan actor and director who began acting in the 1980s and 1990s in RCTV telenovelas.

== Filmography ==
=== As director ===
As director
Year	Title	Role	Notes
2004	Chalino Sánchez: Una vida de peligros	Director	Video documentary

=== Television ===
Television
Year	Title	Role	Notes
1979	Estefanía	Gabriel Seijas	Debut on TV
1981	Quiero Ser	Edgardo Vidal	Alongside boy band Menudo
1982	Jugando a vivir	Diego	
1984	Topacio	Dr. Andrade	
1985	Cristal	Adán Marshall	
1990	Amándote	Rubén Márquez	
1990	Cita con el Amor	Host	
1992	Inolvidable	Asdrúbal	
1992	Soy Gina	Father Nolan	
1992	Princesa	Ramiro	
1993	Déjate querer	Javier	
1993	Celeste, siempre Celeste	Juan Ignacio Pérez Terrada	
1994	Cara bonita	Martin	
1994	Perla negra	Dante Andrade Zamora	
1994	Poliladrón	"Venezolano" Arancibia	
1996	Zíngara	Kolia Stevanovich	
2000	La Revancha	Óscar Riverol	
2003	Te amaré en silencio	Tony	
2005	La ley del silencio	Luis Alberto	Supporting cast
2007	El gato tuerto	César	Supporting cast
2009	Encrucijada	Tío Jesús	
2010	El fantasma de Elena	Alan Martin	Supporting cast
2010	Aurora	Ignacio Miller	Supporting cast
2011	La casa de al lado	Igor Mora	Special participation
2011	Una Maid en Manhattan	Amador Colina	Supporting cast
2013	Pasión prohibida	Guillermo Arredondo	Main cast
2013	11-11: En mi cuadra nada cuadra	Don Camilo	Special participation
2014	Cosita linda	Narciso Luján	Special guest
2014	Reina de corazones	Octavio de Rosas	Guest star
2016	Eva la trailera	Robert Monteverde	Main cast
2017	La fan	Dr. Machado	Guest star
2017	La Piloto	Chacón	Guest star
2018–2019	Amar a muerte	Camilo Guerra	Main cast
2020	Rubí	Boris	Main cast
2020	Como tú no hay 2	Federico Mercurio	Main cast
2021	Si nos dejan	Fabián Caballero	Main cast
2022	Los ricos también lloran	Father Guillermo	Main cast
2023	Pienso en ti	Alfonso Rivero	Main cast
2024	La historia de Juana	Memo Renteria	Main cast
2024–2025	El extraño retorno de Diana Salazar	Manuel Otálora	Recurring role
2025	Velvet: El nuevo imperio	Lorenzo Spinetti	Guest star
2026	Doc		Guest Star

=== Films ===
- The Christ Child (2021)
- Uma (2018)
- Aurora (2016) Shortfilm
- Devuelveme la vida (2016)
