= Lis Vega =

Cuban actress, singer, vedette and model (born 1977)

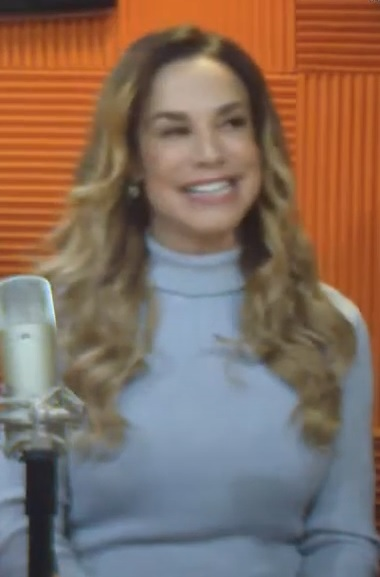
- Born: Liseska Vega Gálvez; October 20, 1977 (age 49); Havana, Cuba
- Other name: Liz Vega
- Occupation: Actress
- Height: 1.62 m (5 ft 4 in)

Lis Vega (born October 20, 1977) is a Cuban actress, singer, vedette and model, best known for her roles in the Mexican TV series Santa Diabla and Amorcito corazón.

== Personal life ==
Vega was born as Liseska Vega Gálvez on October 20, 1977, in Havana, Cuba. She is married to Mauro Rivera and has one sister, Lieska Vega Gálvez. Her parents, Lázaro Vega and Martha Elena Gálvez, divorced when she was ten years old.

At 15, Vega went to Italy in a cultural exchange where she participated in the TV show Cuba 95. In 1997, she emigrated to Mexico.

In 2008, Vega married Federico Díaz, who later confessed his homosexuality to her, ending their marriage after only four months.

On February 11, 2013, she married Chilean Mauro Rivero after a month of dating, when they had known each other only eight months.

== Career ==
Vega lived in Mérida, Yucatán after emigrating to Mexico, then moved to Mexico City where she attracted the attention of Juan Osorio. In 2004 Vega accepted the role as fellow Cuban, Niurka Marcos, in Mi Verdad which was produced by Osorio, a docudrama about the "roller coaster" relationship between Niurka and Osorio.

Vega appeared in Playboy magazine in 2003, 2011 and in 2016. She appeared on the cover in 2011 and in 2016 she was featured as part of a tribute to vedettes which included a six-day, two-week stage show of Vega singing and dancing burlesque, tango and the Mexican hat dance at the Ferrocarrilero Theater in Mexico City, Mexico.

In 2005 Vega participated in Big Brother VIP: México, she was the 13th out of 25 to be expelled from the competition.

In 2013 Vega participated in Santa Diabla as Lisette Guerrero, after moving to Miami. In 2014 Vega took part in Miami Fashion Week. That same year she performed as "Fly" in Goooza: A Musical Cabaret Show at the Flamingo Theater Bar in Miami, Fl as well as in a tribute to Charlie Chaplin called Burlesque.

By 2016 Vega had become an "internet sensation". She had acquired 183,000 followers on Instagram with videos of her workouts, one of which had gone viral.

In 2018 Vega recorded the single "Como a Nadie le Importa" with fellow Cuban Romi.

== Filmography ==
=== Films ===
Film roles
Year	Title	Roles	Notes
2004	Mi verdad	Niurka Marcos	

=== Television ===
Television roles
Year	Title	Roles	Notes
2001	Otro Rollo	Herself	
2002	Big Brother VIP: México	Herself (as Liz)	
2004	Misión S.O.S. aventura y amor	Sonia	
2004	Hospital el paisa	Enfermesera	
2005	Contra viento y marea	Juncal	
2005	VidaTv	Herself	
2005	Los perplejos	Herself	
2006	Duel of Passions	Coral	
2006	Bailando por la boda de tus sueños	Herself	
2010	Zacatillo, un lugar en tu corazón	Olga	
2011	Amorcito corazón	Doris	
2011	Como dice el dicho	Various	
2012	Estrella2	Herself	
2013	Santa Diabla	Lisette Guerrero	
2015	Si Se Puede	Herself	
2016	El Minuto Que Cambió Mi Destino	Herself	
2017	Exathlon Brasil	Herself – Mexico	
2017	Exatlón México	Herself	
2025	La Granja VIP	Herself	

Video
Year	Title
2006	La mesa que más aplauda
