= Virna Flores =

Peruvian actress (born 1977)

- Born: Virna Giannina Flores Di Liberto; February 13, 1977 (age 49); Lima, Peru
- Occupation: Actress
- Years active: 1996–present
- Spouse: Ismael La Rosa
- Children: 2

Virna Giannina Flores Di Liberto (born February 13, 1977) is a Peruvian actress.

== Biography ==
She began acting on television in soap operas Peru's rich and Love Vicky Serrano.

Then, she strengthened her acting career by participating in Maria Emilia, dear, Miracles and Ecstasy.

In 2002, she starred in telenovela Gata Salvaje, co-produced by Venevision and Fonovideo. The following year she participated in cheeky Love, American telenovela Telemundo. In 2004 she played for the telenovela Inocente de ti.

She returned to Peru in 2006 to star in Amores like ours with Ismael La Rosa. The following year she starred in the telenovela Cornered, Venevision International.

In 2008, she starred in the soap opera produced by Telemundo Betrayal. The following year she participated in an episode of the Fox series Final time.

In December 2008, she married the actor Ismael La Rosa, after 12 years of relationship and in 2010 their first child was born.
