= 3rd Your World Awards =

Annual US media awards show

2014 Premios Tu Mundo
- Date: August 21, 2014
- Location: American Airlines Arena in Miami, Florida
- Country: United States
- Hosted by: Gaby Espino; Aarón Díaz

Television/radio coverage
- Network: Telemundo

2014 Your World Awards is the third annual award hosted by Telemundo, which awarded prizes to the beauty, sports, music, film and telenovela. It aired on August 21, 2014, at 8pm/7c. It was hosted by Gaby Espino and Aarón Díaz.

== Winners and nominees ==
=== Novelas ===
Novela of the Year	Favorite Lead Actress
Santa Diabla; El Señor de los Cielos 2; En otra piel; Marido en alquiler	Gaby Espino - Santa Diabla; María Elisa Camargo - En otra piel; Carmen Villalobos - El Señor de los Cielos; Sonya Smith - Marido en alquiler
Favorite Lead Actor	The Best Bad Boy
Rafael Amaya - El Señor de los Cielos; Aarón Díaz - Santa Diabla; David Chocarro - En otra piel; Jorge Luis Pila - En otra piel	Carlos Ponce - Santa Diabla; Mauricio Ochmann - El Señor de los Cielos; Miguel Varoni - Marido en alquiler; Fabián Rios - Dama y obrero
The Best Bad Girl	Best Supporting Actress
Ximena Duque - Santa Diabla; Fernanda Castillo - El Señor de los Cielos; Maritza Rodríguez - Marido en alquiler; Christian Bach - La impostora	Daniela Navarro - Marido en alquiler; Frances Ondiviela - Santa Diabla; Maricela González - En otra piel; Silvana Arias - En otra piel
Best Supporting Actor	First Actor
Gabriel Coronel - Marido en alquiler; Ariel Texido - Marido en alquiler; Ricardo Chávez - Marido en alquiler; Raúl Méndez - El Señor de los Cielos	Manuel Landeta - La impostora; Guillermo Quintanilla - En otra piel; Javier Gómez - En otra piel; Fred Valle - Santa Diabla
First Actress	Favorite Young Actor
Gilda Haddock - Santa Diabla; Alba Roversi - Marido en alquiler; Felicia Mercado - Dama y obrero; Zully Montero - Santa Diabla	Kimberly Dos Ramos - Marido en alquiler; Gala Montes - En otra piel; Kendra Santacruz - En otra piel; Macarena Oz - La impostora
The Perfect Couple	Best Bad Luck Moment
Gaby Espino and Carlos Ponce - Santa Diabla; Fernanda Castillo and Rafael Amaya - El Señor de los Cielos; Gaby Espino and Aarón Díaz - Santa Diabla; Sonya Smith and Juan Soler - Marido en alquiler	Santa Diabla; Camelia La Texana; Dama y Obrero; Marido en Alquiler

=== Music ===
Favorite Band	Favorite Norteño Artist
Kevin Ortiz; Espinoza Paz; Julión Alvarez y su Norteño Banda; La Arrolladora Banda el Limón de René Camacho	Gerardo Ortíz; Calibre 50; El Komander; Luis Coronel
Favorite Duo or Group	Favorite Pop Artist
Il Volo; Chino & Nacho; Camila; Reik	Enrique Iglesias; Chayanne; Luis Fonsi; Shakira
Favorite Tropical Artist	Favorite Urban Artist
Prince Royce; Carlos Vives; Marc Anthony; Romeo Santos	Daddy Yankee; J Balvin; Pitbull; Yandel
Party Starter Song	Most Popular Song of the Year
"Bailando"; "La Temperatura"; "Moviendo Caderas"; "Vida"	"Darte un Beso"; "Adrenalina"; "Propuesta Indecente"; "Vivir Mi Vida"

=== Variety ===
I'm Sexy and I Know It	¡Qué Papacito!
Ximena Duque; Carmen Villalobos; Daniela Navarro; María Elisa Camargo	Gabriel Coronel; Aarón Díaz; Carlos Ponce; Rafael Amaya
Fan Club of the Year	Social Sensation
Espinelas (Gaby Espino); AdamariFans (Adamari López); BossBeeNation (Chiquis Rivera); Roycenaticas (Prince Royce)	Luis Coronel; Aracely Arámbula; Chino (Jesús Miranda); Ricky Martin
Favorite Sports Moment	Best Reality Moment
Rumbo al Mundial: Costa Rica vs México; Deportes Telemundo: El Debut de NASCAR; Titulares y Más: Super Bowl 48; Titulares y Más: Elvis Crespo y Tito Trinidad	Caso Cerrado; La Voz Kids; Larrymania; Top Chef Estrellas

== Special awards ==
- Favorite of the Night - Kevin Ortiz

== Performers ==
Name (s)	Role	Performed
La Ley	Performers	"Sin ti" and "El duelo".
Olga Tañón and Elvis Crespo	Performers	"A celebrar"
Alexis & Fido	Performers	"Rompe la cintura"
Gabriel Coronel	Performer	"Yo te amé"
Yandel, Gadiel and Farruko	Performers	"Plakito"
Los Tucanes de Tijuana	Performers	"La Señora de Acero"
Natalia Jiménez	Performer	"Creo en mí"
Lucero	Performer	"Te deseo lo mejor"
Gerardo Ortíz	Performer	"Eres una niña"
Juanes	Performer	"Una flor"
