= Milagros de Navidad =

American Spanish-language TV series

- Genre: Drama
- Directed by: Otto Rodríguez; Arturo Manuitt; Héctor Márquez
- Creative director: Raquel Tuati
- Music by: Shafik Palis
- Country of origin: United States
- Original language: Spanish
- No. of seasons: 1
- No. of episodes: 20

Production
- Executive producer: Carlos Lamus
- Producers: Marcos Venezca; Vladimir Giménez
- Production locations: Los Angeles; Miami; New York; Chicago; Texas
- Cinematography: Jesus Ivan Rodriguez
- Editors: Sebastián Elizondo; José Antonio Cano
- Camera setup: Multi-camera
- Production company: Telemundo Studios

Original release
- Network: Telemundo
- Release: 27 November – 22 December 2017

Milagros de Navidad (English: Christmas Miracles) is an American anthology television series that premiered on Telemundo on 27 November 2017, and concluded on 22 December 2017. The series is composed of independent chapters that have as a thread the conflicts that Latin immigrants live in the United States during the Christmas season.

The first season consists of 20 episodes and was broadcast from 27 November 2017 to 22 December 2017.

The first complete advance of the series was launched on Telemundo on November 23, 2017, during the broadcast of Macy's Thanksgiving Day Parade.

== Overview ==
Each episode presents stories of love, family, unity and hope, all developed during the Christmas season. Each chapter portrays its protagonists in situations that can be challenging, but always happiness, family unity, and faith will triumph thanks to a Christmas miracle.

== Guest stars ==
Many celebrities have guest starred in Milagros de Navidad season one. They include Alejandro Speitzer, Sonya Smith, Gabriel Valenzuela, Carmen Aub, Lambda García, Tony Garza, Ximena Duque, Héctor Soberón, Rodrigo de la Rosa, Gabriel Rossi, Lupita Ferrer, Ahrid Hannaley, Daniela Navarro, Mijail Mulkay, Wanda D'Isidoro, Litzy, Leo Deluglio, Jorge Luis Pila, Vanessa Villela, Paulo Quevedo, Flor Elena González, Gloria Peralta, Samadhi Zendejas, Eduardo Serrano, Laura Flores, Bobby Larios, Isabella Castillo, Natasha Domínguez, Ricardo Álamo, Gabriel Porras, Sabrina Seara, Javier Valcárcel, Elizabeth Gutiérrez, Alexandra Pomales, Sandra Destenave, Leonardo Daniel, Marisela González, Danny Pardo, Alicia Machado, Jesús Moré, Tina Romero, Gabo López, Ricardo Chávez, Rosalinda Serfaty, and Silvana Arias.

== Episodes ==
No.	Title	Directed by	Written by	Original release date	US viewers (millions)
1	"Adiós soledad"	Héctor Márquez	Luis Colmenares	27 November 2017	1.07
Randy is a 17-year-old gang member who illegally crossed the border the United States to murder his father. He who murdered his mother. After a street fight, Randy meets Soledad, a nurse who decides to help him. On the other hand is Tomás, a policeman who is in love with Soledad. Inadvertently, Randy gets in serious trouble for money he owes and can not pay, so he decides to steal money from Soledad, but during a confrontation, Soledad is shot and Randy is captured by the migration. Tomas gives Soledad a surprise saying that Randy is free and that he can stay in the United States. Cast: Alejandro Speitzer as Randy, Sonya Smith as Soledad, and Gabriel Valenzuela as Tomás
2	"Jesús nació en California"	Jaime Segura	Basilio Álvarez	28 November 2017	1.08
Mariana and Amaro cross the border illegally on Christmas Day. Both are persecuted by a group of thugs who want to prevent Mariana from giving birth. Cast: Carmen Aub as Mariana, Lambda García as Amaro, and Tony Garza as Jiménez
3	"No lo deporten"	Otto Rodríguez	Cristina Policastro	29 November 2017	1.13
Andrés is a genius child who looks for a way to prevent his father from being deported before Christmas. Cast: Christian Adrian as Andrés, Ximena Duque as Lucia, Héctor Soberón as Juez Marquez, and Rodrigo de la Rosa as Ramón
4	"Promesa navideña"	Otto Rodríguez	Alex Echevarría	30 November 2017	1.07
Daniel has to work during Christmas as a nurse for a wealthy woman, to pay for the transplant his son needs. Cast: Gabriel Rossi as Daniel García, Lupita Ferrer as Señora María Collins, Mariet Rodríguez as Diana Collins, Carlos Santos as Jorge Collins, Ahrid Hannaley as Casey, and Nicolás Maglione as Ángel García
5	"Solos"	Arturo Manuitt	Sergio Mendoza	1 December 2017	0.84
An illegal immigrant, a lost child and an American citizen are alone at Christmas. After a series of situations that unite them, they decide to spend the Christmas Eve together. Cast: Daniela Navarro as Carmen, Noah Rico as Toño, Mijail Mulkay as Claudia's Husband, and Wanda D'Isidoro as Claudia,
6	"El milagro del niño Diego"	Arturo Manuitt	Patricia Rodríguez	4 December 2017	1.10
A woman separates from her husband, on Christmas Eve, and plans to reconnect her children. However, Christmas is ruined, when one of them is lost before a snowstorm. Cast: Litzy as Mónica, Martín Fajardo as Diego, Ana Wolferman as Gabriela, Kevin Cabrera as Felipe, and Alberto Pujols as El Camionero
7	"Adiós Benjamín"	Jaime Segura	Manuel Mendonza Arguinzones	5 December 2017	1.04
Benjamin leaves his mother, on the eve of Christmas to travel and meet his father. When he succeeds, he discovers a bitter truth. Now he values the effort his mother made to get it through alone. Cast: Leo Deluglio as Benjamín, Viviana Ligarde as Eliana, Eduardo Román as Víctor, Rebeca Badia as Cristina, and Carolina Ayala as Jennifer
8	"Abriendo muros"	Jaime Segura	Yutzil Martínez Sifontes	6 December 2017	1.14
Elsa returns to meet her loved ones at Christmas, thanks to the "Abriendo Muros" foundation that allows families to gather at the border and hug each other for three minutes. Cast: Jorge Luis Pila as Rafael, Vanessa Villela as Margaret, and Bibiana Navas as Elsa
9	"El regalo más grande"	Héctor Márquez	Neida Padilla	7 December 2017	1.10
Miguel Ángel does not know that his parents are undocumented, until prior to Christmas, ICE arrests them. He is sent to a center for minors, from where he escapes to look for his own. Cast: Paulo Quevedo as Ruben, Ana González as Anita, Carlos Gastellum as Elias, Martha Pabón as Isabel, Samantha Lopez as Marisol, and Flor Elena González as Irina
10	"Navidad en urgencias"	Arturo Manuitt	Sergio Mendoza	8 December 2017	1.03
Marina suffers from cancer and it gets complicated. This forces her family to spend Christmas with her in a hospital. In the middle of the storm, a solution appears to get medical assistance. Cast: Gloria Peralta as Marina, Adrián Carvajal as Homero, Laura Vieira as Gloria, Gaby Borges as Leticia, and Simone Marval as Eliza
11	"La pesadilla de Candelaria"	Arturo Manuitt	Carolina Díaz	11 December 2017	1.06
Candelaria lives a nightmare by having her son sick, during Christmas. Cast: Samadhi Zendejas as Candelaria, Enrique Montano as Santiago, Miranda Coiman as Naty, Isabel Moreno as Doña Cata, Eduardo Serrano as Joaquin, and Rolando Tarajano as Rubén
12	"Solo de arpa"	Arturo Manuitt	Gilda Santana	12 December 2017	1.05
The dream of Lorena is to enter the conservatory of music; due to lack of resources, her parents fear to support her, her boyfriend encourages her and her little brother asks that her sister's dream be fulfilled. Cast: Laura Flores as Lupe, Bobby Larios as Ramón, Paulina Matos as Lorena, and Eduardo Ibarrola as Don Miguel
13	"Un milagro en la cocina"	Arturo Manuitt	Saida Santana	13 December 2017	1.16
Marina wants to be the chef of the restaurant where she works as a cleaning lady. On Christmas, she has the opportunity to fulfill her dream, thanks to a miracle in the kitchen. Cast: Keller Wortham as John, Isabella Castillo as Marina, and Rafael Romero as Iturralde
14	"Una sorpresa para Elisa"	Arturo Manuitt	Carlos Roa	14 December 2017	1.28
Elisa lives captive, victim of a trafficking network. When she manages to escape, she meets a policeman who falls in love with her; but the language becomes a barrier to their relationship. Cast: Natasha Domínguez as Elisa, Gabriel Rossi as Mike, and Ricardo Álamo as Manny
15	"In-Feliz Navidad"	Otto Rodríguez	Patricia Rodríguez	15 December 2017	1.04
José proclaims himself the king of Christmas, his favorite holiday and he always throws the house out the window. This December, he has new neighbors and they want to show that their Christmas is the best. Cast: Gabriel Porras as José, Sabrina Seara as Carol, Javier Valcárcel as Christopher, and Ana Sobero as María
16	"Lolita"	Héctor Márquez	Verónica Suárez	18 December 2017	1.02
Lolita is undocumented in the US and works to fulfill her daughter's dream: to study at the university. ICE arrests the grandmother of the family. The three join to avoid deportation. Cast: Elizabeth Gutiérrez as Lolita, Samantha Siqueiros as Kathy, Martha Mijares as Roberta, and Javier Valcárcel as John
17	"Llega mamá y yo presa"	Héctor Márquez	Erick Hernández	19 December 2017	1.14
Karen assaults her boss, after he tries to rape her. When being stopped by the police, her process of deportation begins. Karen's mother arrives in the US and tries to prevent it. Cast: Alexandra Pomales as Karen, Sandra Destenave as Elizabeth, Fabián Pizzorno as Frank, Ana Sobero as Marisela
18	"Hermanos"	Jaime Segura	Consuelo Garrido	20 December 2017	1.12
Toña hopes to meet, for the first time in a long time, with her children in the United States to celebrate Christmas. But they are stopped by a stern immigration officer. Cast: Pepe Gámez as Jerry, Stephanie Arcila as Rosa, Beto Ruiz as Damián, Lilian Tapia as Toña, and Leonardo Daniel as José
19	"Fervor en Noche Buena"	Jaime Segura	Cristina Policastro	21 December 2017	1.13
Margarita falls in love with a criminal. Her mother decides that they should go to the US, to get her away from him. There, the mother-daughter relationship gets worse, until the mother gets sick and her daughter must take care of her. Cast: Marisela González as Rocío, Vico Escorcia as Margarita, Carlos Yorvick as Fermin, Rogelio Ramos as César, Danny Pardo as José, and Roberto Arrizon as Pandillero
20	"Perra Navidad"	Jaime Segura	Miguel Ángel Baquero	22 December 2017	1.00
Juana gives shelter to 40 dogs abandoned by their deported owners. In the middle of Christmas, her neighbors and her landlord demand that she leave the house. Only a miracle can help her find a new refuge. Cast: Alicia Machado as Juana, Jesús Moré as Ronald, and Tina Romero as Sofia

== Ratings ==
Viewership and ratings per season of Milagros de Navidad
Season	Timeslot (ET)	Episodes	First aired		Last aired		Avg. viewers (millions)	18–49 rank
Season	Timeslot (ET)	Episodes	Date	Viewers (millions)	Date	Viewers (millions)	Avg. viewers (millions)	18–49 rank
1	Mon–Fri 8pm/7c	20	27 November 2017	1.07	22 December 2017	1.00	1.08	TBD
