= 2014 Miami Life Awards =

- Date: Saturday, January 25, 2014
- Location: Miami, State United

The Miami Life Awards is an annual awards, where several actors television movies including category are nominated to be awarded a prize.

== Awards and nominations for novela ==
Novela	Nominations	Awards
Marido en Alquiler	15	9
Santa Diabla	10	1
Dama y Obrero	8	0
Pasión Prohibida	6	0
El Señor de los Cielos	3	0
La Patrona	2	0
Corazon Valiente	1	0

== Categories ==
=== Best Telenovela ===
Novela	Result
Marido en Alquiler	Won
Santa Diabla	Nominated
Pasión Prohibida	Nominated
Dama y Obrero	Nominated
El Señor de los Cielos	Nominated

=== Best Female Main Character Telenovela ===
Actor	Novela	Result
Sonya Smith	Marido en Alquiler	Won
Gaby Espino	Santa Diabla	Nominated
Ximena Herrera	El Señor de los Cielos	Nominated
Ana Layekska	Dama y Obrero	Nominated
Aracely Arámbula	La Patrona	Nominated

=== Best Male Main Character Telenovela ===
Actor	Novela	Result
Juan Soler	Marido en Alquiler	Won
Carlos Ponce	Santa Diabla	Nominated
Rafael Amaya	El Señor de los Cielos	Nominated
Jencarlos Canela	Pasión Prohibida	Nominated
Jorge Luis Pila	La Patrona	Nominated

=== Best Supporting Actress telenovela ===
Actor	Novela	Result
Maritza Rodríguez	Marido en Alquiler	Won
Mercedes Molto	Pasión Prohibida	Nominated
Diana Quijano	Dama y Obrero	Nominated
Tina Romero	Dama y Obrero	Nominated
Frances Ondiviela	Santa Diabla	Nominated

=== Best Supporting Actor telenovela ===
Actor	Novela	Result
Javier Valcarcel	Santa Diabla	Won
Ricardo Chavez	Marido en Alquiler	Nominated
Ricardo Dalmachi	Dama y Obrero	Nominated
Ariel Texido	Marido en Alquiler	Nominated
Paulo Quevedo	Marido en Alquiler	Nominated

=== Best First telenovela actress ===
Actor	Novela	Result
Alba Roversi	Marido en Alquiler	Won
Zully Montero	Santa Diabla	Nominated
Felicia Mercado	Dama y Obrero	Nominated
Rebecca Jones	Pasión Prohibida	Nominated
Gledys Ibarras	Santa Diabla	Nominated

=== Best First telenovela actor ===
Actor	Novela	Result
Miguel Varoni	Marido en Alquiler	Won
Gerardo Riveron	Santa Diabla	Nominated
Roberto Mateos	Santa Diabla	Nominated
Roberto Vander	Pasión Prohibida	Nominated
Henry Zakka	Pasión Prohibida	Nominated

=== Best young actress telenovela ===
Actor	Novela	Result
Kimberly Dos Ramos	Marido en Alquiler	Won
Daniela Navarro	Marido en Alquiler	Nominated
Ana Carolina Grajales	Marido en Alquiler	Nominated
Sofia Lamas	Dama y Obrero	Nominated
Sofía Sanabria	Corazón Valiente	Nominated

=== Best young actor telenovela ===
Actor	Novela	Result
Roberto Manrique	Marido en Alquiler	Won
Gabriel Coronel	Marido en Alquiler	Nominated
Pablo Azar	Marido en Alquiler	Nominated
Nicolas Oyuzun	Dama y Obrero	Nominated
Lincoln Palomeque	Santa Diabla	Nominated

=== Best Television Channel ===
Channel	Result
América TV	Nominated
CNN en Español	Nominated
Mega Tv	Nominated
Telemundo 51	Won
Univision 23	Nominated

== Social ==
=== Print Magazine of the year ===
Channel	Result
Conexiones	Nominated
Ocean Drive	Nominated
Selecta	Nominated
Gente Latina	Won
Venue	Nominated

=== Newspaper of the Year ===
Newspaper	Result
El Especial	Nominated
El Nuevo Herald	Nominated
El Venezolano	Nominated
Diario Las Américas	Won
Doral News	Nominated
