= List of programs broadcast by Televen =

Televen is a Venezuelan television, transmitting educational programs, soap operas, sports, news and variety shows. The following is a list of programs broadcast by Televen.

== Current programs ==
=== Soap operas ===
Title	Run	Source
Alma de hierro	n/a	
Carita pintada	n/a	
Hasta el fin del mundo	April 21, 2015	

=== Programming ===
Title	First broadcast	Last broadcast	Source
Yo soy el artista	September 21, 2014	present	
Escándalos	August 13, 2014	present	
Pepsi Streams, tercera temporada	August 22, 2014	present	
El Show de la Pantera Rosa	August, 2014	present	
Plaza Sésamo	April, 1989	present	
Consentidos estrellas	August 17, 2013	present	
Se ha dicho	February 14, 2012	present	
El avispero	June 20, 2013	present	
Tas Pillao	June 18, 2013	present	
La Bomba	July 28, 2008	present	
Hermes “El Iluminado” or Código Hermes	May 2, 2013	present	

== Former ==
=== Telenovelas ===
- 11-11: En mi cuadra nada cuadra (2014)
- 5 Viudas Sueltas (2013)
- Alguien te mira (2010–11)
- Amor azul (2013)
- Apuestale a la vida (2014)
- Las bandidas (2013)
- Como aman los hombres (2014)
- Corona de Lágrimas (2013)
- Corazón valiente (2012–13)
- Cuento de otoño (2014-2015)
- Destino (2013)
- En nombre del honor (2011–12)
- Escándalos
- Flor Salvaje (2011)
- Gabriela (2013–14)
- La impostora (2015-2015)
- Una Maid en Manhattan (2012–13)
- Marido en alquiler (2013–14)
- Mi corazón insiste en Lola Volcán (2012–13)
- Mi prima Ciela (2014-2015)
- Mis 3 Hermanas (2014)
- La mujer del Vendaval (2014-2015)
- Nora (2014)
- La otra cara del alma (2013)
- Pan, amor y sueños (2013)
- Para volver a amar (2015-2015)
- Pasión prohibida (2013)
- Pobres Rico (2013)
- Por Ella Soy Eva (2013)
- Primera dama (2011)
- Un refugio para el amor (2013)
- Rosa diamante (2013)
- El rostro de la venganza (2013)
- Santa Diabla (2013–14)
- Las santísimas (2013–14)
- Sonata de invierno (2013)
- La Tormenta (2013–14)
- Las Vega's (2014)
- La virgen de la calle (2013)
