= Dama y obrero (American TV series) =

American television series

- Genre: Telenovela
- Created by: Sandra Velasco
- Based on: Dama y obrero by José Ignacio Valenzuela
- Screenplay by: Yutzil Martínez; Gerardo Cadena
- Directed by: Vicente Albarracín; Jaime Segura
- Creative director: Óscar Cortés
- Starring: Ana Layevska; José Luis Reséndez; Fabián Ríos; Felicia Mercado
- Theme music composer: Jimmy Pulido; Fabo Romero
- Opening theme: "El guardián de tu vida" performed by Roberto Tapia
- Country of origin: United States
- Original language: Spanish
- No. of episodes: 115

Production
- Executive producer: Jairo Arcila
- Producer: Gemma Lombardi
- Cinematography: Juan Pablo Puentes; Reinaldo Figueira; Ignacio González
- Editor: Juan Carlos Albornoz
- Camera setup: Multi-camera
- Production company: Telemundo Studios

Original release
- Network: Telemundo
- Release: June 24 – October 18, 2013

Related
- Pasión prohibida; Marido en alquiler; Dama y obrero (original series)

Dama y obrero (Lit: Lady and Worker / English: Labor of Love) is a Spanish-language telenovela produced by United States–based television network Telemundo Studios, Miami. It is a remake of the Chilean telenovela of the same title produced by TVN in 2012. Ana Layevska and José Luis Reséndez stars as the protagonists, while Fabián Ríos, Felicia Mercado and Sofía Lama stars as the antagonists.

On June 24, 2013, Telemundo broadcast Dama y Obrero, replacing Pasión Prohibida. The last episode was broadcast on October 18, as part of Telemundo's changes in prime-time programming, and because of low ratings. On October 21, 2 hours of Marido en Alquiler have been temporarily broadcast weeknights at 8pm/7c. As with most of its other telenovelas, the network broadcast English subtitles as closed captions on CC3.

== Plot ==
Ignacia (Ana Layevska) is a young engineer working at a large construction company, Omega Construction, which is owned by Tomás Villamayor (Fabián Ríos), her boyfriend. They spend much time together and finally decide to get married, but Ignacia misconceives the kind of person that Tomás really is. Shortly before their wedding, they have a very strong fight in which Tomas tries to hit her but is foiled by the intervention of Pedro. that makes Ignacia leave the town and take time for reflection.

She meets Pedro o Pérez (Jose Luis Resendez), a simple laborer without money and big aspirations, who makes her forget all her problems. The attraction between the two is immediate and mutual (love at first sight). They cannot avoid spending a memorable weekend together, which ends on a Sunday afternoon by when the two are madly in love with each other. However, Ignacia knows that, what she is experiencing is a dream, a parenthesis in her life. When Pedro awakes on Monday morning, he thus finds a note at his side saying that Ignacia thanks him, and she is leaving without a trace.

On Ignacia's return home, Tomás is awaiting her with the news that he is offering her a new position in his company and he is looking for her forgiveness. She agrees but gets surprised when she comes to the workplace in her position of construction supervisor to see Pedro as a worker at the construction site. Despite having every reason in the world not to be together, Ignacia and Pedro discover that their love persists over all prejudices, differences, rejection and, the many, sometimes cruel, obstacles raised by others, who want to see them apart.

== Cast ==
=== Main ===
- Ana Layevska as Ignacia Santamaría
- José Luis Reséndez as Pedro Pérez
- Fabián Ríos as Tomás Villamayor
- Felicia Mercado as Estela Mendoza
- Mónica Sánchez Navarro as Margarita Pérez
- Shalim Ortíz as José Manuel Correal
- Leonardo Daniel as Mariano Santamaría
- Sofia Lama as Mireya Gómez
- Tina Romero as Alfonsina Cardemil
- Riccardo Dalmacci as Olegario Gómez
- Christina Dieckmann as Karina Cuervo
- Lilian Tapia as Berta Suárez / Gina Pérez
- Alex Ruiz as Christopher Melquíades Godínez
- Óscar Priego as Rubén Santamaría
- Roberto Plantier as Ángel García
- Carolina Ayala as Guadalupe "Lupita" Pérez

=== Recurring ===
- Diana Quijano as Gina Pérez
- Kendra Santacruz as Isabel García
- Rosalinda Rodríguez as Petra García
- Alexander Torres as El Ratón
- Héctor Fuentes as Enrique Molina
- Angeline Moncayo as Gema Pacheco Maldonado
- Osvaldo Strongoli as Ernesto Villamayor

== Awards and nominations ==
Year	Award	Category	Nominated	Result
2013	Premios People en Español			
2013	Premios People en Español	Best Telenovela	José Ignacio Valenzuela	Nominated
2013	Premios People en Español	Best Actress	Ana Layevska	Nominated
2014	Miami Life Award			
2014	Miami Life Award	Best Telenovela	José Ignacio Valenzuela	Nominated
2014	Miami Life Award	Best Actress	Ana Layevska	Nominated
2014	Miami Life Award	Best Supporting Actress	Diana Quijano	Nominated
2014	Miami Life Award	Best Supporting Actress	Tina Romero	Nominated
2014	Miami Life Award	First Best Actress	Felicia Mercado	Nominated
2014	Miami Life Award	Best Supporting Actor	Riccardo Dalmacci	Nominated
2014	Miami Life Award	Best young actress	Sofía Stamatiades	Nominated
2014	Miami Life Award	Best Young Actor	Nicolas Oyuzun	Nominated
2014	Premios Tu Mundo			
2014	Premios Tu Mundo	First Actress	Felicia Mercado	Nominated
2014	Premios Tu Mundo	Best Bad Luck Moment	When they find out he has a sister	Nominated
