= El talismán =

- Genre: Telenovela
- Created by: Verónica Suárez
- Directed by: Carlos Perez Santos
- Starring: Blanca Soto; Rafael Novoa; Aarón Díaz; Lola Ponce
- Opening theme: "El Talismán" by Rosana Arbelo
- Ending theme: "Me voy" by Paulina Rubio
- Countries of origin: Venezuela; United States
- Original language: Spanish
- No. of episodes: 101

Production
- Executive producers: Peter Tinoco; Carlos Sotomoyer
- Production locations: Tijuana, Mexico; San Antonio, Texas; Los Angeles, California; Fresno, California; Miami, Florida
- Running time: 40–50 minutes
- Production company: Venevisión International Productions

Original release
- Network: Venevisión; Univisión
- Release: January 30 – June 15, 2012

El Talismán (The Talisman) is a telenovela co-produced by Venevision and Univision Studios, starring Blanca Soto and Rafael Novoa as the main protagonists, and Aarón Díaz, Lola Ponce, and Marcela Mar as the main antagonists. Univision had announced that El talismán would air on the network as part of the 2011–2012 programming schedule, and was confirmed to air in 2012 on November 11, 2011. Though 120 episodes were planned to be produced, the episode count was reduced to a total of 101 due to low ratings.

From January 30 to February 3, 2012, Univision aired El talismán at 8pm/7c, replacing one hour of Una familia con suerte, and later at 9 pm/8c from February 6 to March 9, 2012. Though El talismán was seen by 5 million viewers during its premiere day, viewership declined over time during its prime time airings. As a result, Univision aired El talismán at 1 pm central from March 12 to June 15, 2012.

== Cast ==
- Blanca Soto as Camila Nájera de Ibarra
- Rafael Novoa as Pedro Ibarra
- Aarón Díaz as Antonio Negrete
- Lola Ponce as Lucrecia Negrete
- Marcela Mar as Doris de Negrete / Catherine
- Karyme Lozano as Mariana Aceves
- Julieta Rosen as Elvira Rivera de Nájera
- Roberto Vander as Esteban Nájera
- Sergio Reynoso as Don Gregorio Negrete
- Pablo Azar as José Armando Nájera
- Braulio Castillo as Renato Leduc
- Roberto Huicochea as Valentin Ramos
- Paola Pedroza as Tracy Guadalupe Perez
- Tatiana Rodríguez as Genoveva
- German Barrios as Bernando Aceves
- Rodrigo Vidal as Panchito Negrete
- Joaquin Gil as Margarito Flores
- Gloria Mayo as Patricia "Paty" Aceves
- Isabel Burr as Fabiola Negrete
- Sandra Itzel as Florencia Negrete
- Marianela Rodriguez as Rosa
- Gustavo Pedraza as Tomas Guerrido
- Glauber Barceló as Claudio Flores
- Lyduan González as Gabriel Barrasa
- Michelle Vargas as Sarita
- Yuli Ferreira as Rita Ledesma
- Carlos Arrechea as Juancho
- Gabriela Guevara as Suzy
- Nadia Escobar as Alberta Sierra
- Manolo Coego Jr. as Raúl
- Alma Delfina as Matilde Aceves
- Carmen Daysi Rodríguez as Brigitte
- Gerardo Riverón as Guillermo
- Hilda Luna as Domitila
- Juan Cepero as Jim Smith
- Victoria del Rosal as Lucy
- Elioret Silva
- Severino Puente as Secretario
- Freddy Viquez as Lucas
- Víctor Cámara as Manuel Bermúdez
- Eva Tamargo as María Rivera
- Adrián Carvajal as Ángel Espinoza
- Christian Vega as Santiago
