= Aurora (TV series) =

2010 American TV series

- Genre: Telenovela
- Created by: Marcela Citterio
- Developed by: Telemundo Studios
- Directed by: David Posada; Tony Rodriguez; Otto Rodriguez
- Starring: Sara Maldonado; Eugenio Siller; Jorge Luis Pila; Vanessa Pose; Lisette Morelos; Aylín Mújica; Sonya Smith
- Theme music composer: Marco Flores
- Opening theme: "Aurora" by Eugenio Siller
- Country of origin: United States
- Original language: Spanish
- No. of episodes: 135

Production
- Executive producer: Aurelio Valcárcel Carroll
- Production locations: New York City, Miami, Florida
- Editors: Ramiro Pardo; Hader Antivar Duque
- Camera setup: Multi-camera
- Running time: 42-45 minutes

Original release
- Network: Telemundo
- Release: November 1, 2010 – May 20, 2011

Aurora is a Spanish-language telenovela produced by the United States–based television network Telemundo. It starred Sara Maldonado, Eugenio Siller, and Jorge Luis Pila. As part of the 2010–11 season, Telemundo aired the series from November 1, 2010, to May 20, 2011, weeknights at 8 p.m. eastern, replacing El Clon. As with most of its other telenovelas, the network broadcasts English subtitles as closed captions on CC3.

== Role changes ==
The Main Female protagonists are Sara Maldonado and Lisette Morelos while the main male protagonist are Eugenio Siller and Jorge Luis Pila. The Main Female Antagonist in the telenovelas first episode is initially Vanessa Pose as Vanessa Miller however Aylin Mújica becomes an antagonist from the second episode onwards playing an older Vanessa Miller, Vanessa Pose then went on to play Victoria Houghton, Vanessa’s daughter. Monica Franco went on to play a bigger antagonist as well in the telenovela. Sara Maldonado left the production after 103 episodes for personal reasons and the plot line had to change Aylin Mujica’s character changed, making her a Co-protagonist, Monica Franco’s character was removed also. Vanessa Pose left the telenovela but was asked however to come back and take Sara Maldonado’s place as a Main Female Protagonist she accepted and her character was cryogenically revived, Sonya Smith also came on to replace Sara Maldonado as Angela Amenábar. Zuleyka Rivera went on to play the main female antagonist, while Melvin Cabrera the Main Male Antagonist. Due to Sara Maldonado’s departure and the change of storyline, more actors were added include David Chocarro, Carolina Tejera, Zully Montero, Angelica Maria and Juan Pablo Llano

== Plot ==
Set in New York City, the story begins in 1990 with a 20-year-old dancer named Aurora Ponce de León (Sara Maldonado). She attends New York School of the Arts with her two best friends, Natalia Suárez (Talina Duclaud) and Vanessa Miller (Vanessa Pose). One night after a dance rehearsal, they all go to a bar, where Aurora meets Lorenzo Lobos (Eugenio Siller), a dance instructor and single father. Aurora and Lorenzo fall madly in love but Vanessa, who had always been jealous of Aurora, is infuriated by this because she is also in love with Lorenzo. She tries everything to separate them, going as far as inviting Lorenzo to Aurora's lavish twentieth birthday party (Lorenzo was unaware that Aurora was wealthy), where she makes sure he sees Federico (Ismael La Rosa) kiss Aurora. Lorenzo storms off, believing that he has been betrayed. Aurora runs after Lorenzo and declares her love for him, but it doesn't work and Lorenzo wants nothing more to do with Aurora.

Aurora returns home heartbroken and after an argument with her father, Gustavo (Braulio Castillo), she faints. Gustavo takes her to his cryogenic clinic to run tests. It is discovered that Aurora is pregnant with Lorenzo's baby. Her father refuses to tell Lorenzo about the pregnancy and sends her as far away from him as possible.

A few months pass and Aurora tries to run away and return to Lorenzo, but she falls and goes into labor. She gives birth to a girl, who she names Blanca. Aurora becomes very ill and on her deathbed, calls Lorenzo, and says to him with her dying breath, "I will always love you." Lorenzo hears a flat line and all the commotion, and Gustavo decides to freeze Aurora in a cryogenic capsule.

Aurora wakes up after 20 years, only to discover that Lorenzo (Jorge Luis Pila) is married to Natalia (Sandra Destenave). Blanca (Lisette Morelos) doesn't know that Aurora is her mother, because she was raised by her grandparents, who told her that her mother was her sister. Aurora plays along with it and keeps her real identity a secret. However, after Lorenzo's son Martin (Eugenio Siller) falls in love with Aurora, all the secrets starts coming out. Nothing remains the same as father and son share one love. But will the love of them last?

== Cast ==
=== Main ===
- Sara Maldonado as Aurora Ponce de León: Inés and Gustavo's daughter; Pasíon's goddaughter; Lorenzo's love interest, later wife; Martin's former love interest; Blanca and Aurorita's mother. (Dead)
- Eugenio Siller as
  - Martín Lobos: Lorenzo's nephew; Aurora's former love interest; Liliana's former love interest; Victoria's husband.
  - young Lorenzo Lobos
  - young Sebastián Lobos
- Jorge Luis Pila as Lorenzo Lobos: Aurora's love interest, later widower; Natalia's ex-husband, Nina's foster father; Blanca and Aurorita's father; Angela's love interest; Martin's uncle.
- Lisette Morelos as Blanca Lobos Ponce de León: Aurora and Lorenzo's daughter; Aurorita's sister; Caesar's wife; Martin's cousin.
- Vanessa Pose as
  - Victoria "Vicky"Hutton Miller: Vanessa's daughter; Blanca's childhood friend; Caesar's one sided lover; Martin's wife.
  - young Vanessa Miller Quintana
- Aylín Mújica as Vanessa Miller Quintana de Álvarez: Victoria's mother; Aurora's friend; Lorenzo's one sided lover; Caesar's former love interest; Federico's wife.
- Sonya Smith as Angela Amenábar: Clara's sister; Lorenzo's lawyer and love interest.
- Carolina Tejera as Clara Amenábar: Angela's sister; Christian's one sided lover.
- Angélica María as Pasión Urquijo: Christian's mother; Aurora's godmother.
- Pablo Azar as César Lobos / Julio César Lobos de la Vega: Elizabeth's son; Lorenzo and Natalia's adoptive son; Vanessa's former love interest; Blanca's husband.
- David Chocarro as Christian Santana / Christian Miller Urquijo: Pasión's son; Catalina's godson; Nina's love interest.
- Zully Montero as Catalina Quintana de Pérez: Vannesa's mother. (Dead)

=== Recurring ===
- Braulio Castillo as Dr. Gustavo Ponce de León: Aurora's father; Inés' ex-husband; Elizabeth's former accomplice and ex-husband; Natalia's husband.
- Ismael La Rosa as Federico Álvarez de Toledo: Aurora's former suitor; Vanessa's husband.
- Sandra Destenave as Natalia Suárez: Nina's mother; Ernesto's former love interest; Lorenzo's ex-wife; Aurora's friend; Gustavo's wife.
- Karen Sentíes as Inés Ponce de León: Gustavo's ex-wife; Aurora's mother; Roque's love interest.
- Melvin Cabrera as Ernesto Podestá: Natalia's former love interest; Nina's father; Victoria's one sided obsessive lover. (Dead)
- Mónica Franco as Dr. Elizabeth Oviedo: Caesar's mother; Gustavo's ex-wife. (Dead)
- Talina Duclaud as
  - Nina Lobos: Ernesto and Natalia's daughter; Blanca's friend; Martin's one sided obsessive lover; Christian's love interest.
  - young Natalia Suárez
- Zuleyka Rivera as Diana del Valle: Martin's obsessive ex-girlfriend. (Dead)
- Rubén Morales as Roque: Driver of the Ponce de Leon's; Inés' love interest.
- Miguel Augusto Rodríguez as Dr. Williams: doctor at Gustavo's clinic.
- Carla Rodríguez as Dr. Liliana Rosales: Martin's former love interest. (Dead)
- Juan Pablo Llano as Ramiro: patient at Cryonics Clinic, revived after 30 years. (Dead)
- Sabrina Pila as Aurora "Aurorita" Lobos Ponce de León: Aurora and Lorenzo's daughter; Blanca's sister.
- Ana Carolina Grajales as Charlotte

== Awards and nominations ==
Year	Award	Category	Nominated	Result
2012	Premios Tu Mundo	The Best Bad Girl	Aylín Mújica	Nominated
2012	Premios Tu Mundo	Best Supporting Actor	Jorge Luis Pila	Nominated
2012	Premios Tu Mundo	Best Novela Soundtrack	Aurora, by Eugenio Siller	Nominated
