= Escándalos =

- Also known as: Escándalos: Todo es real excepto sus nombres
- Created by: César Cierra
- Starring: Various
- Original language: Spanish
- No. of seasons: 1

Production
- Executive producers: Annette Ayala; Ricardo Álamo
- Camera setup: Multi-camera

Original release
- Network: Televen
- Release: September 7, 2015 – present

Escándalos (Scandals), is a Spanish-language television series written by César Sierra. The pilot episode of the series was released on August 14, 2014 in Televen, before the premiere of the telenovela Avenida Brasil. The pilot episode starred Nohely Arteaga and Miguel de León.

The series was released on 7 September 2015, Televen premieres a new episode every Monday. In Venezuela it is known as Escándalos and the rest of the world as Escándalos: Todo es real excepto sus nombres.

== Plot ==
The series focuses his plot into a scandal in each of its separate chapters walks through several themes of the social environment, such as family, money and the laws.

== Cast ==
- Nohely Arteaga as Gabriela Rellán
- Miguel de León as Cristóbal Rellán
- Zully Montero
- Scarlet Ortiz
- Yul Bürkle
- Antonio Delli
- Daniel Lugo
- Paulo César Quevedo
- Eduardo Serrano
- Michelle Posada
- Ricardo Álamo
- Miguel Varoni
- Socrates Serrano
- Maria Alejandra Martin
- Karl Hoffman
- Carla Baratta
- Laureano olivares
- Cesar Bencid
- Oscar Cabrera
- Jhoana Juliette
- Jean Carlos Simancas

== Series overview ==
Season	Episodes	Originally released
Pilot		August 14, 2014
1	40	September 7, 2015

== Episodes ==
=== Pilot (2014) ===
Title	Directed by	Written by	Original release date
"El lado oscuro"	Tony Rodríguez	César Sierra	August 14, 2014
Cristóbal Rellán is a candidate for the political party and Gabriela Rellán is his wife. Cristóbal has sex with a young woman, which then accuses him of rape. Gabriela, the wife of Cristóbalr helps you to hide this "scandal" to be elected as Governor of the State where they live.
