= Ileana Jacket =

Venezuelan actress

- Born: 30 January 1947 (age 79); Leverkusen, Germany
- Other name: Ileana Jacquet
- Occupations: Actress; dancer
- Years active: 1982-present
- Spouse: Frederick Smith (former)
- Children: Sonya Smith

Ileana Jacket (also Ileana Jacquet; born 30 January 1947) is a Venezuelan actress. She made her debut in 1982 in the telenovela Jugando A Vivir playing Briggitte and has since participated in several telenovelas throughout Latin America. Jacket is the mother of actress Sonya Smith.

== Early life ==
Jacket was born on 30 January 1947 in Leverkusen, Germany. Her father was born to his Finnish mother and French father, while her mother is a German born and raised in Argentina, fluent in Spanish. Jacket already spoke Spanish through her mother, she migrated to Venezuela with her parents. Aside from Spanish and native German, she is fluent in Finnish, French and English.

== Career ==
In 1983, Jacket joined the cast of Leonela where she played Miss Raitza. The telenovela was very successful in Venezuela and Latin America. In 1985, she was cast in Cristal is as Bertha Girot.

Jacket has also had roles in Maria Celeste and Corazon Valiente.

== Filmography ==
1984	Topacio	Carmen Julia (Enfermera)
2012	Corazón Valiente	Josefina Uriarte
1994	María Celeste	Herminia Azpurua
1993	Amor de Papel	Flor
1992	Cara sucia	Candelaria's neighbor
1989	Rubí rebelde	Carolina
1988	Abigail	Estrella
1985	Cristal	Bertha Girot
1983	Leonela	Raitza
1982	Jugando A Vivir	Briggitte Castro
