= El noticiero =

- Genre: News
- Presented by: Various
- Country of origin: Venezuela
- Original language: Spanish

Production
- Running time: 40 minutes

Original release
- Network: Televen
- Release: 1988 – present

El noticiero (The News) is a Venezuelan news program, it broadcasts daily on Televen. Its motto is Nuestro deber es informar, opinar es su derecho.

== See also ==
- List of programs broadcast by Televen
