= 13 segundos =

- Film poster
- Directed by: Freddy Fadel
- Starring: Gabriela Vergara; Lourdes Valera; Daniela Alvarado; Víctor Cámara; Roberto Lamarca
- Release date: 2006
- Country: Venezuela
- Language: Spanish

13 segundos is a Venezuelan drama film released in 2006, directed by Freddy Fadel and starring Gabriela Vergara, Lourdes Valera, Daniela Alvarado, Víctor Cámara, Roberto Lamarca, Augusto Galíndez.

== Plot ==
A story inspired by real events where five babies and their mothers expose their fears in a bet between life and death; a cruel reality will lead them to discover that, when it comes to survival, every second counts.

== Cast ==
- Gabriela Vergara as Claudia
- Lourdes Valera as Mercedes
- Daniela Alvarado as Luisa
- Víctor Cámara as Dr. Eduardo Valladares
- Roberto Lamarca as Alonso
- Augusto Galíndez as Manuel
- Nohely Arteaga as Lorena de Valladares
- Emma Rabbe as Isaura
- Sabrina Seara as Daniela
- Norkys Batista as Mariela

== Reception ==
Panfletonegro gave it an extremely critical review, describing the film as having poor aesthetics, calling the in-utero shots "particularly irritating and repulsive." The reviewer criticizes the film for being literal, heavy-handed, and having a conservative anti-abortion message. Describes it as "anticine" (anti-cinema) that underestimates its audience.

In an interview, actress Gabriela Vergara discusses her role and the film's approach to abortion, stating the film aims to show both pros and cons of abortion without taking a definitive position.

FULLTV stated "Good, fulfills its objective of entertaining. The plot is interesting and the characters stand out."
