= Felina =

Felina or felinae may refer to:

== Animals ==
- Felinae, scientific classification for small cats
- Lontra felina, scientific name of the marine otter

== Arts and entertainment ==
=== Fictional characters ===
- Felina Furr, the secret identity of Alley-Kat-Abra (DC Comics)
- Professor Felina Ivy, a Pokémon character
- Felina, the cat of Princess Ozana of Storybook Mountain in The Magical Mimics in Oz
- Felina Feral, another cat from Swat Kats

=== Television ===
- "Felina" (Breaking Bad), the series finale of Breaking Bad
- Felina: Prinsesa ng mga Pusa, a 2012 Philippine television drama on Associated Broadcasting Company (TV5)
- Felina (telenovela), a 2001 Venezuelan telenovela

== Other uses ==
- La Felina, a ring name of professional wrestler Gail Kim (born 1977)

== See also ==
- Feleena, a woman in Marty Robbins' song "El Paso"
