= Bajo el mismo cielo (TV series) =

American telenovela

- Genre: Telenovela
- Created by: Perla Farías
- Based on: A Better Life by Chris Weitz
- Written by: José Vicente Spataro; Cristina Policastro; Sergio Mendoza; Iralyn Valera; Gustavo Bracco; Perla Farías
- Directed by: Claudio Callao; Nicolás Di Blasi
- Creative directors: Maria Eugenia González-Naranjo; Valeria Fiñana
- Starring: Gabriel Porras; María Elisa Camargo; Erika de la Rosa; Luis Ernesto Franco; Julio Bracho
- Theme music composer: Las Cafeteras
- Opening theme: "La bamba rebelde" by Las Cafeteras
- Country of origin: United States
- Original language: Spanish
- No. of seasons: 1
- No. of episodes: 122 (list of episodes)

Production
- Executive producers: Joshua Mintz; Martha Godoy; David Posada
- Producers: Rafael Villasmil; Judy Martinez; Jairo Arcila; Luisa Ibáñez
- Cinematography: José Luis Velarde; Miguel Font
- Editor: Hader Antivar Duque
- Camera setup: Multi-camera
- Production company: Telemundo Studios

Original release
- Network: Telemundo
- Release: July 28, 2015 – January 25, 2016

Related
- Tierra de reyes; Eva la trailera

Bajo el mismo cielo (English title: Under the Same Sky), is an American telenovela created by Perla Farías for Telemundo. The telenovela is an adaptation of the 2011 American drama film A Better Life directed by Chris Weitz by the screenplay Eric Eason.

== Plot ==
Carlos Martínez (Gabriel Porras), an undocumented immigrant living in Los Angeles, is a good, hardworking man who wants to give a good future and better opportunities to his children. Carlos is a widowed man who only lives with his youngest son, Luis (Alejandro Speitzer). His oldest son, Rodrigo (Luis Ernesto Franco) became a gang member and left the house years ago, during his teenage years. Carlos faces several difficulties and dangers because of his legal situation, but remains optimistic and tries to live honestly and decently, working as a gardener. He has a relationship with a Mexican-American woman named Felicia (Erika de la Rosa) who owns a bar and is desperately obsessed with him. On the other side of the story, Adela Morales (María Elisa Camargo)is a young and beautiful woman who lives in Lancaster with her brother Matías (Carlos Ferro) and her alcoholic mother Laura (Rosalinda Rodríguez). Like Carlos, Adela came into the United States as a young girl and is also undocumented. Adela and Matías joined a gang named La Colonia since they were teens. La Colonia is led by Colmillo (Julio Bracho) and his right-hand, who is actually Rodrígo, now known as "El Faier". One day, one of Carlos co-workers and friend tells him that he is leaving the United States and will go back to Mexico, so he wants to sell Carlos his old truck, so Carlos can continue working as a gardener and also start his own gardening business. Carlos borrows the money from his sister, María (Liz Gallardo) and purchases the truck. Meanwhile, Adela and Matías are taken prisoners by La Colonia, after the gang discovered that Matías is having deals with a rival gang. Noemí (Cristina Mason), another gang member, accuses them both to cover herself because she has been stealing drugs from La Colonia. Matías is killed by the order of Rodrígo, who ordered his death from jail, and Adela is marked down in her belly as a traitor. Adela escapes from La Colonia, and they start hunting her to kill her. One day, Carlos stops in a store to buy some supplies and parks his new truck outside. Adela is walking nearby, hiding from La Colonia. Suddenly she sees some members of La Colonia, and desperate to escape, she sees Carlos's truck and steals it. Carlos runs behind the truck and is able to get himself attached to the door. Carlos and Adela, despite the situation, fall in love at first sight, and from that moment starts their story together.

== Cast ==
=== Main ===
- Gabriel Porras as Carlos Martínez
- María Elisa Camargo as Adela Morales
- Erika de la Rosa as Felicia Méndez
- Luis Ernesto Franco as Rodrigo Martínez / El Faier
- Julio Bracho as José Giménez / El Colmillo
- Alejandro Speitzer as Luis Martínez
- Mercedes Molto as Deborah Sanders
- Kendra Santacruz as Greicy Cordero
- José Guillermo Cortines as Cristóbal Méndez
- Liz Gallardo as María Solís Martínez
- Fernando Noriega as Willy López
- Keller Wortham as Jacob Sanders
- Oka Giner as Susy Sanders
- Raúl Arrieta as Rudolfo Solís
- Freddy Flórez as Santiago Yépez
- Rosalinda Rodríguez as Laura Morales
- Ximena Ayala as Juana García
- Ahrid Hannaley as Isabel Garrido
- Kevin Aponte as Nick Hernández
- Andrés Zúñiga as Jay Ortega
- Felipe Betancourt as Gacho
- Cristina Mason as Noemí
- Giancarlo Vidrio as Mago
- Alma Itzel Méndez as Sharon López

=== Recurring ===
- Cristian Adrian as El Alacrán
- Cristina Figarola as Oficial Ramírez
- Juan Pablo Llano as Erick Vilalta
- Braulio Hernández as Pedro Solís
- Nicole Arcí as Lupita Solís
- Michelle Posada as Estela
- Xabier Rubalcaba as Young Rodrigo Martínez
- Roberto Escobar as Alan Landonie
- Carlos Ferro as Matías Morales
- Adriana Bermúdez as Vanessa
- Susy Rosado as Ximena

== Ratings ==
Viewership and ratings per season of Bajo el mismo cielo
| Season | Timeslot (ET) | Episodes | First aired | | Last aired | | Avg. viewers (millions) | 18–49 rank |
| Season | Timeslot (ET) | Episodes | Date | Viewers (millions) | Date | Viewers (millions) | Avg. viewers (millions) | 18–49 rank |
|---|---|---|---|---|---|---|---|---|
| 1 | Mon–Fri 9pm/8c | 122 | July 28, 2015 | 1.71 | January 25, 2016 | 2.01 | TBD | TBD |

== Awards and nominations ==
| Year | Award | Category | Nominated works | Result |
|---|---|---|---|---|
| 2016 | Premios Tu Mundo | Premios Tu Mundo for Novela of the Year | Bajo el mismo cielo | Won |
| 2016 | Premios Tu Mundo | Premios Tu Mundo for Favorite Lead Actor | Gabriel Porras | Won |
| 2016 | Premios Tu Mundo | Premios Tu Mundo for Favorite Lead Actress | María Elisa Camargo | Nominated |
| 2016 | Premios Tu Mundo | The Best Bad Girl | Erika de la Rosa | Won |
| 2016 | Premios Tu Mundo | The Best Bad Boy | Luis Ernesto Franco | Won |
| 2016 | Premios Tu Mundo | Favorite Actress | Ximena Ayala | Nominated |
| 2016 | Premios Tu Mundo | Favorite Supporting Actor | Alejandro Speitzer | Won |
| 2016 | Premios Tu Mundo | The Perfect Couple | María Elisa Camargo and Gabriel Porras | Nominated |
| 2016 | Premios Tu Mundo | Revelation of the Year | Oka Giner | Nominated |
