= El gato tuerto =

Venezuelan telenovela

- Genre: Telenovela
- Created by: César Sierra
- Written by: Amaris Páez; Fernando Martínez; Valentina Saa; César Sierra
- Screenplay by: César Sierra
- Story by: Germán Pérez Nahím
- Directed by: Juan Carlos Ariza
- Creative director: Evelin Pérez
- Starring: Sabrina Seara; Andrés Scarioni
- Music by: Armando Mosquera
- Opening theme: "El gato tuerto" by Oscar D'León
- Country of origin: Venezuela
- Original language: Spanish

Production
- Executive producer: Henry Márquez

Original release
- Network: Televen
- Release: November 5, 2007

El gato tuerto is a Venezuelan telenovela created Germán Pérez Nahim and adapted by César Sierra for Televen. The show is the first telenovela produced by Televen, and premiered on 5 November 2007 registering high audience levels with a total of 34% share. It stars Sabrina Seara and Andrés Scarioni.

== Synopsis ==
Gato Tuerto is a comedy that is nourished by what happens daily in a television station. Stories of love, healthy or alienated desire for success, professionalism, ego, in short a whole world as a novel in which tragicomedy abounds.

== Cast ==
- Sabrina Seara as María Amatista
- Andres Scarioni as Daniel / El Gato
- Alexandra Rodríguez as Sabrina
- Ana Karina Casanova as La Gata
- Willy Martín as Andy Bizot
- Pastor Oviedo as Alejandro
- Jamie Sasson as Victoria
- Javier Valcárcel as Ignacio
- Henry Zakka as César
- Mariam Valero as Scarlett
- Willy Martin
- Javier Valcarcel
