= Ahrid Hannaley =

Mexican television host and actress

- Born: Ahrid Hannaley Suárez Pérez-Tejada; May 3, 1987 (age 39); Mexico City, Mexico
- Occupation: Actress
- Years active: 1999-present

Ahrid Hannaley (born May 3, 1987), is a Mexican television host and actress.

== Filmography ==
=== Film ===
Film
Year	Title	Role	Notes
2011	Punto muerto	Belen Miller	
2014	Clowns of America	Clown	Short film
2015	Tenías que ser tú	Jessica	Post-production

=== Television ===
Television
Year	Title	Role	Notes
1999	DKDA: Sueños de juventud	Camila Niña	
2000	Siempre te amaré	Rossana	
2004	Rebelde	Consuelo	
2005	Alborada	La Roja	
2006	Código postal	Pilar	
2008	Vecinos	Yeyis	8 episodes
2010	La rosa de Guadalupe	Rebeca	Season 1, Episode 1: "La receta mágica"
2011	Corazón apasionado	Regina	
2012	Corazón valiente	Cecilia	
2013	Marido en alquiler	Beatriz Lobo	
2013	Suelta la sopa	Herself	Host
2015	Bajo el mismo cielo	Isabel Garrido	
2023	Vuelve A Mí	Tania Solórzano	7 Episodes
