= Paola Pedroza =

Paola Pedroza was born in El Paso, Texas, United States, but was raised in Ciudad Juarez, Chihuahua, Mexico.

During her second year of college Paola began hosting a one-hour magazine TV show called Exprésate. The show began locally and then went national on TV Azteca Mexico, after 5 months of airing in her home town. She starred in two feature films in Mexico.

She left home and went to Mexico City, where she was an entertainment reporter for Con Sello De Mujer and Cada Mañana, which were national shows airing on TV Azteca Mexico. After eight months she took up a job for the same station in Los Angeles. She was there for four months, then moved to MUN2 television to host Off the Roof, a one-hour magazine show where she co hosted with AlexIII from Superestrella 107.1.

After seven months the show ended, and she became the host of a show called La Conexion, also airing on MUN2 television and Telemundo Internacional. After a year and a half she took on two new shows called En Concierto and LATV does Hollywood for LATV, where she was able to combine music with hosting, her two main passions in life.

Paola then took a year off to pursue her love of singing and record her first album called Pasion, Ritmo y Vida. Pepsi then asked her to host the Pepsi Musica one-hour music show in Los Angeles, airing nationally on Telefutura. During this year, she combined hosting Pepsi Musica with a weekly segment on the show Escandalo TV.

Thanks to these past shows, she was asked by Telefutura to join as a guest host on their new show Fiesta de Pelicula, where she hosted alongside Rosina and Mauricio on a two-hour show that consists of bringing the best of Hollywood to the TV audience. Simultaneously Paola was hosting Picnic in Mexico City in TeleHit. After Picnic she became correspondent for E Entertainment Latin America in Miami.

After a year an opportunity came about to be in soap operas, casting for a role interpreting Lola in the soap opera Pecadora transmitted by Univision next to actors and actresses like Litzy, Eduardo Capetillo, Ariel Lopez Padilla, and Paulo Quevedo y Sergio Klainer. After two months just about finishing Pecadora, she returned to Venevision to shoot her second soap opera called Sacrificio de Mujer.

After taking a short break, she returned to Univision to host the Pepsi Music Super Bowl Fan Jam, an annual event that showcases the Super Bowl through a musical looking glass. Paola is shooting her third soap opera in Miami Florida called El Talismán, and it is set to air soon as part of the primetime lineup of Univision. As of 2014 she co-hosts the critically acclaimed international franchise The Voice in its Spanish-speaking version for Telemundo titled La Voz Kids parallel to her two-year gig with Yahoo.com hosting the daily show OMG HOY.
