= Sacrificio de mujer =

- Genre: Telenovela
- Created by: Carlos Pérez
- Directed by: Adriana Barraza; Héctor Márquez; Tito Rojas; Yaky Ortega; María Eugenia Perera
- Starring: Marjorie de Sousa; Juan A. Baptista; Mariana Torres; Pablo Azar; Géraldine Bazán; Luis Jose Santander; Flor Núñez
- Opening theme: Siento performed by Chayanne
- Countries of origin: Venezuela; United States
- Original language: Spanish
- No. of episodes: 101

Production
- Executive producers: Peter Tinoco; Ana Teresa Arismendi
- Producers: Dulce Teran; Arquimedes Rivero
- Production location: Miami, Florida
- Camera setup: Multi-camera
- Running time: 42 minutes
- Production company: Venevisión

Original release
- Network: Venevisión; Univision
- Release: April 18 – July 7, 2011

Related
- Pecadora; Eva Luna

Sacrificio de mujer (English title: A Woman's Sacrifice) is a Spanish-language telenovela produced by Venevisión International.

Marjorie de Sousa and Juan A. Baptista star as the main protagonists with Mariana Torres and Pablo Azar as co-protagonists. Luis Jose Santander, Flor Núñez, Géraldine Bazán, Arnaldo Pipke and Ximena Duque star as the main villains.

Filming took place in Miami, Florida, in 2010. From April 18, 2011 to June 17, 2011, Univision aired double episodes weekday afternoons at 12pm/11am central. From June 20, 2011 to July 7, 2011, the remaining episodes aired for one hour weekday afternoons. As of September 21, 2011, Venevisión is currently airing Sacrificio de Mujer at 10pm.

== Plot ==
Clemencia Astudillo is a young, humble woman who falls in love with Luis Francisco Vilarte, the spoilt and illegitimate son of Giovanni Tallamonti. After his father's death, Luis Francisco leaves for Europe to enjoy his inheritance and father's businesses without knowing that Clemencia is pregnant. Clemencia tries to inform Luis Francisco about her condition, but his mother Amada, a cold and calculating woman, lies to her that Luis Francisco is in Brazil and wants nothing to do with her. Without any form of income, Clemencia was left in the abject poverty and suffered until one day she woke up in the hospital without her baby with the doctor informing her she cannot have children. Devastated, she seeks comfort in Augusto Talamonti, the doctor who treated her.

Twenty years later, Clemencia is happily married to Augusto with their 3 adopted children: Enzo and the twins Gina and Marife. Young orphan Milagros who was raided up in an orphanage by nuns come to look for a job at Clemencia's successful company and falls in love with Enzo, Clemencia's son.

Meanwhile, in Europe, Luis Francisco is bankrupt after gambling away his inheritance. Following Amada's advice to go and demand his share of the inheritance from his half-brother Augusto who doesn't know of his existence, he discovers that Clemencia is married to his half-brother Augusto.

== Cast ==
- Marjorie de Sousa as Clemencia Astudillo Talamonti/Clemencia Astudillo de Vilarte- Augusto's dedicated ex-wife, mother of Milagros, adoptive mother of Enzo, Marife and Gina, married to Luis Francisco.
- Juan A. Baptista as Luis Francisco Vilarte- Milagros' dedicated father, son of Amada Villarte, half brother of Augusto, husband of Clemencia Astudillo Talamonti
- Mariana Torres as Milagros Exposito Talamonti/Milagros Vilarte Astudillo de Talamonti- daughter of Clemencia and Luis Francisco, mother of Juan Francisco in love with Enzo Talamonti, wife of Enzo Talamonti.
- Pablo Azar as Enzo Talamonti- Adopted son of Clemencia and Augusto, in love with Milagros
- Luis José Santander as Dr. Augusto Talamonti- Doctor, husband of Clemencia; adoptive father of Enzo, Marife and Gina, lover of Maria Gracia in love with Lorena Camargo
- Flor Núñez as Amada Vilarte- Mother of Luis Francisco, Milagros' grandmother, Clemencia's enemy. Villain. Commits suicide.
- Géraldine Bazán as Victoria "Vicky" Lombardo- Villain, Enzo's former girlfriend, Amada's accomplice. Ends up in prison.
- Taniusha Capote as Gina Talamonti- villain, later good, in love with Braulio then with her doctor
- Taniusha Capote as Marife Talamonti – twin sister of Gina, former novice, in love with Braulio
- Cristian Carabias as German Anzola- Criminal, later good. Worked for Amada. Son of Eulalia and Artemio
- Pedro Moreno as Braulio Valdes- Police officer, brother of Benito, in love with Gina, then with Marife
- Adrian Mas as Benito Valdes- Brother of Braulio
- Anna Sobero as Eulalia Anzola- Mother of German
- Ariel Texido as Father Anibal- Priest. Killed by Amada.
- Arnaldo Pipke as Leoncio- Amada's driver and lover. villain
- Beatriz Arroyo as Olga Valdes- Mother of Braulio and Benito
- Carmen Daysi Rodriguez as Mayre- Clemencia's secretary, villain
- Eduardo Ibarrola as Vilachar- Friend of Augusto
- Reinaldo Cruz as Del Risco- lover of Maria Gracia
- Fidel Perez Michel as Eliseo Lombardo- Selma's husband, Vicky's father.
- Jessica Cerezo as Belinda- Clemencia's secretary
- Fernando Carrera as Giovanni Tallamonti-Augusto's and Luis Francisco's deceased father.
- Jorge Consejo as Juan Pablo- Father of Milagros' baby, Juan Francisco
- Jose Guillermo Cortines as Marcos Castillo- Friend of Luis Francisco
- Juan Troya as Dr. Guzman
- Tatiana Capote as Lorena Camargo- Enzo's biological mother, Luis Francisco's ex-lover, in love with Augusto Talamonti
- Liliana Rodríguez as Alberta- wife of Benito
- Lis Coleandro as Sister Teresa
- Lyduan Gonzalez as Willy- Criminal, worked for Amada. Friend of German
- Mary Kler Mata as Vitelva
- Norma Zuñiga as Tomasa- Housekeeper of the Talamonti family
- Paloma Márquez as Mitzy- best friend of Gina
- Paola Pedroza as Luisita- friend of Milagros
- Ramón Morell as Baltasar- Clemencia's driver
- Roberto Javier as Cristian Reyes
- Sonia Noemi as Madre Pilar- Deceased administrator of the San Francisco Orphanage killed by Leoncio
- Victoria del Rosal as Stefany
- Xavier Coronel as Artemio Anzola- German's deceased drunk father, Eulalia's deceased husband.
- Ximena Duque as Maria Gracia- Lover of Augusto, mother of his daughter Maria Agustina
- Bettina Grand as Selma Lombardo- Mother of Vicky Lombardo, wife of Eliseo Lombardo, villain.
- Mirta Renee as Lidia- Hospital nurse. Killed by hitmen on orders from Selma
- Nury Flores as Señora
- Soledad Esponda as Young Amada Vilarte
