= Pasión prohibida =

Television series

- Created by: Juan Camilo Ferrand
- Based on: Aşk-ı Memnu by Ece Yörenç and Melek Gençoglu
- Written by: Anna Bolena Melendez
- Directed by: Ricardo Schwarz; Vicente Albarracín
- Creative director: Valeria Fiñana
- Starring: Jencarlos Canela; Mónica Spear; Roberto Vander; Mercedes Molto; Rebecca Jones
- Music by: Marco Flores
- Opening theme: "Dime" by Jencarlos Canela
- Country of origin: United States
- Original language: Spanish
- No. of episodes: 107

Production
- Executive producer: Mariana Iskandariani
- Producer: Augusto Navarro
- Cinematography: Joseph Martínez; Juan Pablo Puentes; José Luis Velarde; Argemiro Saavedra
- Editor: Ellery Albarran
- Camera setup: Multi-camera
- Production company: Telemundo Studios

Original release
- Network: Telemundo
- Release: January 22 – June 21, 2013

Related
- Rosa diamante; Dama y obrero

Pasión Prohibida (Spanish pronunciation: [paˈsjom pɾojˈβiða]) is a Spanish-language romantic drama telenovela produced by United States-based television network Telemundo Television Studios, Miami. It is a remake of the Turkish telenovela Aşk-ı Memnu by Ece Yörenç and Melek Gençoğlu. It has been adapted from Halit Ziya Uşaklıgil's novel Aşk-ı Memnu, published in 1900, but takes place in the modern-day Miami, instead of the novel's late 19th-century Istanbul setting. Jencarlos Canela and Mónica Spear starred as the protagonists. Although Telemundo announced a second season, Spear's murder in 2014 brought an end to production.

== United States broadcast ==
Telemundo aired the serial during the 2013 season. From January 22, 2013 to June 21, 2013, Telemundo aired Pasión Prohibida weeknights at 8 pm/7c, replacing Rosa Diamante. Dama y Obrero replaced Pasión Prohibida on June 24, 2013. As with most of its other telenovelas, the network broadcast English subtitles as closed captions on CC3.

== Cast ==
=== Main ===
Actor	Character
Jencarlos Canela	Bruno Hurtado (Ariel Piamonte's nephew, had a relationship with Penélope Santillana and cheated on her; secretly had an affair with his uncle's wife, Bianca Santillana)
Mónica Spear †	Bianca Santillana de Piamonte (Penélope Santillana's sister, Flavia and Martin's daughter, married to Ariel Piamonte and had an affair with Ariel's nephew and her sister's ex-boyfriend, Bruno Hurtado)
Roberto Vander	Ariel Piamonte
Mercedes Molto	Deniz Lefevre "Mademoiselle"
Rebecca Jones †	Flavia Fischer de Santillana

=== Recurring ===
Actor	Character
Henry Zakka	Guillermo Arredondo
Jorge Consejo	Nicolás Arredondo
Carmen Aub	Nina Piamonte
Sabrina Seara	Penélope Santillana de Arredondo
Beatriz Monroy	Celeste de Barrera
Rubén Morales	Salomon Barrera
Marisela González	Francisca Piamonte
Martha Pabón	Nuria de Arredondo
Liannet Borrego	Katia
Sharlene Taulé	Camila Barrera
Priscila Perales	Eliana Ramírez
Gisella Aboumrad	Teresa "Tere" Lopez
Pepe Gámez	Yair Duarte
Nikolás Caballero	Santiago Piamonte
Héctor Soberón	Martín Santillana
Estefany Oliveira	Paula
Ricardo Herranz	Iván Pastrana
Wdeth Gabriel	Sylvia
Jose Manuel Cestari	Sergio
Lina Maya	Marta
Luke Grande	Emilio Herrera
Oscar Díaz	Damián
Carlos Noceti	Fabián Hurtado
Pablo Quaglia	Gabriel Aguirre
Hely Ferrigny	Germán Ramírez
Karina Musa	María
Cristina Figarola	Alicia
Ivanna Rodríguez	Renata
Fabián Pizorno	Daniel Parejo

== Awards and nominations ==
Year	Award	Category	Nominated	Result
2013	Premios Tu Mundo			
2013	Premios Tu Mundo	Best Telenovela	Pasión prohibida	Nominated
2013	Premios Tu Mundo	Favorite Lead Actor	Jencarlos Canela	Won
2013	Premios Tu Mundo	Favorite Lead Actress	Mónica Spear	Nominated
2013	Premios Tu Mundo	The Best Bad Boy	Henry Zakka	Nominated
2013	Premios Tu Mundo	The Best Bad Girl	Rebecca Jones	Nominated
2013	Premios Tu Mundo	First Actor	Henry Zakka	Nominated
2013	Premios Tu Mundo	First Actor	Roberto Vander	Nominated
2013	Premios Tu Mundo	First Actress	Rebecca Jones	Nominated
2013	Premios Tu Mundo	Best Bad Luck Moment	Accident	Nominated
2014	Miami Life Award			
2014	Miami Life Award	Best Telenovela	Pasión Prohibida	Nominated
2014	Miami Life Award	Best Leading Male	Jencarlos Canela	Nominated
2014	Miami Life Award	Best Supporting Actress	Mercedes Molto	Nominated
2014	Miami Life Award	First Best Actress	Rebecca Jones	Nominated
2014	Miami Life Award	First Best Actor	Roberto Vander	Nominated
2014	Miami Life Award	First Best Actor	Henry Zakka	Nominated
2014	International Emmy Awards	Best Non-English Language U.S. Primetime Program	Pasión Prohibida	Nominated
