= Andrés Zúñiga =

Mexican actor and singer

Andrés Zúñiga, is a Mexican television actor and singer, known for Nora, Señora Acero and Bajo el mismo cielo. He has appeared in several plays and in almost two dozen television commercials.

== Filmography ==
Television
| Year | Title | Role | Notes |
|---|---|---|---|
| 2014 | Nora | Félix Villamil | Lead role |
| 2014 | Señora Acero | Orlando Carabias "La Empanada" | Series regular (40 episodes) |
| 2015–16 | Bajo el mismo cielo | Jay Ortega | Recurring role |
