= Alberto Zeni =

Mexican actor

- Born: December 10, 1980 (age 44); Monterrey, Nuevo Leon, Mexico
- Occupation: Film actor

Alberto Zeni (born December 10, 1980) is a Mexican actor. He has participated in various Mexican telenovelas. He also appeared in the American film Ablution as Ibrahim (a Lebanese Muslim who was a Hezbollah bomber). In 2020 he started his second season on Narcos: Mexico. He currently resides in Los Angeles, California.

== Filmography ==
| Year | Title | Role | Notes |
|---|---|---|---|
| 2009 | Borderline | El Tuercas | |
| 2009 | XY. La revista | Roberto Lanzagorta | |
| 2010 | El octavo mandamiento | Octavio | |
| 2011 | El encanto del águila | Fernando Lizardi | |
| 2012 | Morelos | Sacerdote | |
| 2012 | Así es la suerte | Vicente Joven | |
| 2012 | Capadocia | Efrén | |
| 2012 | Hoy soy nadie | Felipe Blanco | |
| 2013 | The Noble Family | Juan Pablo | |
| 2013 | Tlatelolco, Verano de 68 | Líder estudiantil | Uncredited |
| 2013 | 12 Segundos | Alberto | |
| 2014 | Nora | Aurelio Sotolongo | |
| 2017 | The Crash | Young Banker | Uncredited |
| 2018 | La Jaula | Cuñado | |
| 2020 | Narcos: Mexico | Amat Palacios | 8 episodes |
| 2020 | I Am Fear | Jalliel | |
| 2020 | Coyote Hills | Deputy Mendez | |
