= List of Bajo el mismo cielo episodes =

Bajo el mismo cielo (English title: Under the Same Sky), is an American telenovela created by Perla Farías for Telemundo. The telenovela is an adaptation of the 2011 American drama film A Better Life directed by Chris Weitz by the screenplay Eric Eason.

== Episodes ==
No. overall	No. in season	Title	Original release date
1	1	"Carlos descubre que le robaron la camioneta"	July 28, 2015
2	2	"Carlos y Luis descubren el paradero de Adela"	July 29, 2015
3	3	"Carlos atrapa a Adela y juntos deciden buscar la troca"	July 30, 2015
4	4	"Luis es rehén durante un encuentro entre Adela y Noemí"	July 31, 2015
5	5	"Adela le salva la vida a Luis"	August 3, 2015
6	6	"Carlos y Adela se besan"	August 4, 2015
7	7	"El Faier intenta abusar de Greicy"	August 5, 2015
8	8	"Adela le confiesa la verdad a María"	August 6, 2015
9	9	"Carlos piensa que ve a Rodrigo"	August 7, 2015
10	10	"Carlos visita al Faier en la cárcel"	August 10, 2015
11	11	"Carlos le confiesa a Adela que Rodrigo es su hijo"	August 11, 2015
12	12	"Adela llama a Carlos para despedirse de él"	August 12, 2015
13	13	"Adela y Carlos hacen el amor"	August 13, 2015
14	14	"Adela le revela su verdadero nombre a Carlos"	August 14, 2015
15	15	"Felicia besa a Carlos"	August 17, 2015
16	16	"Adela regresa a Lancaster"	August 18, 2015
17	17	"Colmillo le da una oportunidad al Faier"	August 19, 2015
18	18	"Carlos se reencuentra con Adela"	August 21, 2015
19	19	"El Faier es atacado en su celda"	August 24, 2015
20	20	"El Faier sale en libertad"	August 25, 2015
21	21	"Adela se disculpa con Jacob"	August 26, 2015
22	22	"El Faier se encuentra con el Coyote"	August 27, 2015
23	23	"Adela regresa a trabajar a casa de los Sanders"	August 28, 2015
24	24	"El Faier regresa a su casa"	August 31, 2015
25	25	"Adela conoce al Faier"	September 1, 2015
26	26	"Luis besa a Susy"	September 3, 2015
27	27	"Carlos y Adela pasan la noche juntos"	September 4, 2015
28	28	"Adela y Rodrigo discuten"	September 7, 2015
29	29	"Adela regresa a Lancaster"	September 8, 2015
30	30	"Adela quiere asesinar a Rodrigo"	September 9, 2015
31	31	"Rodrigo amenaza a Felicia"	September 10, 2015
32	32	"Adela habla con Carlos de Rodrigo"	September 11, 2015
33	33	"Greicy sufre un accidente"	September 14, 2015
34	34	"Carlos y Adela pasan la noche juntos"	September 15, 2015
35	35	"Adela le confiesa la verdad a Cristóbal"	September 16, 2015
36	36	"Carlos le da una noticia a su familia"	September 17, 2015
37	37	"Rodrigo recibe un disparo"	September 18, 2015
38	38	"Carlos le propone matrimonio a Adela"	September 21, 2015
39	39	"Carlos es arrestado por la migra"	September 23, 2015
40	40	"Rodrigo reza por su padre"	September 24, 2015
41	41	"Carlos se comunica con Adela"	September 25, 2015
42	42	"El Faier descubre que Mati es Adela"	September 28, 2015
43	43	"El Faier le confiesa sus sentimientos a Adela"	September 29, 2015
44	44	"Carlos se niega a firmar su carta de deportación"	September 30, 2015
45	45	"Adela se entera de la muerte de su madre"	October 1, 2015
46	46	"Adela entierra a su madre"	October 5, 2015
47	47	"Carlos sale en libertad bajo palabra"	October 6, 2015
48	48	"Carlos le cuenta a Adela que Felicia está embarazada"	October 7, 2015
49	49	"Greicy descubre que El Faier sigue viendo al Colmillo"	October 9, 2015
50	50	"Déborah y Adela se enfrentan cara a cara"	October 12, 2015
51	51	"Luis enfrenta a su hermano Rodrigo"	October 13, 2015
52	52	"Carlos echa a Rodrigo de la casa"	October 14, 2015
53	53	"Luis y Susy son detenidos por la policía"	October 15, 2015
54	54	"Carlos y Colmillo tienen un encuentro incomodo"	October 16, 2015
55	55	"El Faier consigue una víctima idéntica a Adela"	October 19, 2015
56	56	"El Faier le dice a Adela que ya es libre"	October 20, 2015
57	57	"Los miembros de la Colonia violan a Sharon"	October 21, 2015
58	58	"El Faier le pide perdón a Carlos"	October 22, 2015
59	59	"El Faier le dice a Adela que la ama"	October 23, 2015
60	60	"Adela piensa renunciar a Carlos"	October 26, 2015
61	61	"Adela termina su relación con Carlos"	October 27, 2015
62	62	"El Faier le pide ayuda a Colmillo para encontrar a Luis"	October 28, 2015
63	63	"Adela y Rodrigo buscan a Luis y a Susy"	October 29, 2015
64	64	"Adela rechaza a Rodrigo por besarla a la fueza"	October 30, 2015
65	65	"Carlos y Rodrigo se enfrentan por Adela"	November 2, 2015
66	66	"Greicy regresa sin permiso de Rodrigo"	November 3, 2015
67	67	"Colmillo amenaza a Carlos con matarlo"	November 4, 2015
68	68	"Carlos le hace un regalo muy especial a Adela"	November 5, 2015
69	69	"El Faier planea la muerte de Colmillo"	November 6, 2015
70	70	"Carlos se prepara para un encuentro a solas con Colmillo"	November 9, 2015
71	71	"El Faier le dispara a Colmillo"	November 10, 2015
72	72	"Adela comienza su nuevo trabajo"	November 11, 2015
73	73	"El Faier es el nuevo jefe de la Colonia"	November 12, 2015
74	74	"Adela descubre que Rodrigo es el jefe la Colonia"	November 13, 2015
75	75	"Adela y Jay se enfrenta en presencia del Faier"	November 16, 2015
76	76	"El Faier se entera que Colmillo está vivo"	November 17, 2015
77	77	"El Faier planea la muerte de Colmillo otra vez"	November 18, 2015
78	78	"Jay sorprende a Adela en su casa"	November 19, 2015
79	79	"Rodrigo cita a Adela en un cementerio"	November 20, 2015
80	80	"Greicy rompe fuente en pleno escape"	November 23, 2015
81	81	"Greicy y Felicia dan a luz e intercambian a sus bebes"	November 24, 2015
82	82	"Greicy planea escaparse con su hija"	November 25, 2015
83	83	"Adela confiesa su verdadera identidad y renuncia a la revista"	November 27, 2015
84	84	"El Faier le hace una escena de celos a Adela"	November 28, 2015
85	85	"Carlos y Adela se vuelven a besar"	December 1, 2015
86	86	"Jacob le confiesa su amor a María"	December 2, 2015
87	87	"El patrón de Juana es arrestado por la policía"	December 3, 2015
88	88	"Felicia manipula a Carlos con su hija"	December 4, 2015
89	89	"Greicy y Rodrigo pelean en el bautizo de Anita"	December 7, 2015
90	90	"Carlos y Rodrigo se enfrenan por Adela"	December 8, 2015
91	91	"Adela y Carlos se enfrentan por Rodrigo"	December 9, 2015
92	92	"Colmillo está listo para vengarse del Faier"	December 10, 2015
93	93	"Erick anuncia su matrimonio con Adela"	December 11, 2015
94	94	"El Faier besa a Adela a la fuerza"	December 14, 2015
95	95	"Felicia y Carlos se besan"	December 15, 2015
96	96	"El Faier sospecha que Colmillo está vivo"	December 16, 2015
97	97	"Erick espera a Adela para casarse"	December 17, 2015
98	98	"Adela y Erick se casan"	December 18, 2015
99	99	"Jacob le cuenta la verdad a Carlos"	December 21, 2015
100	100	"Adela y Carlos hacen el amor"	December 22, 2015
101	101	"El Faier se entera que el Colmillo está vivo"	December 23, 2015
102	102	"Felicia se niega a hacerle la prueba a la bebé"	December 25, 2015
103	103	"Greicy y Rodrigo buscan la ayuda de Andrés"	December 28, 2015
104	104	"El Faier salva a Adela de las garras de Colmillo"	December 29, 2015
105	105	"Carlos comprueba que Anita es su nieta"	December 30, 2015
106	106	"Adela le cuenta a Carlos que se irá lejos con Erick"	January 1, 2016
107	107	"Felicia huye y se encuentra con Colmillo"	January 4, 2016
108	108	"Felicia se entrega a Colmillo"	January 5, 2016
109	109	"Colmillo asesina a Erick dentro de la avioneta"	January 6, 2016
110	110	"Adela se siente culpable por la muerte de Erick"	January 7, 2016
111	111	"El Faier llega a la casa de Adela"	January 8, 2016
112	112	"El Faier le jura a Adela que él no mató a Erick"	January 11, 2016
113	113	"Los Martínez, Adela y Greicy se unen para vencer a Colmillo"	January 12, 2016
114	114	"Rodolfo llega a casa de Jacob"	January 13, 2016
115	115	"Rodolfo y Jacob se agarran a golpes"	January 14, 2016
116	116	"Carlos regresa con Adela a su casa"	January 15, 2016
117	117	"Felicia da la orden de torturar a Carlos"	January 18, 2016
118	118	"El Faier se defiende del atentando de Colmillo"	January 19, 2016
119	119	"Colmillo le clava una navaja a Carlos"	January 20, 2016
120	120	"El Faier mata a Colmillo"	January 21, 2016
121	121	"El Faier es sentenciado a muerte"	January 22, 2016
122	122	"El Faier muere ejecutado en prisión frente a sus familiares"	January 25, 2016
