= I Do ... Knot =

2009 Mexican romantic comedy film

- Theatrical release poster
- Spanish: Recién Cazado
- Directed by: Rene Bueno
- Starring: Jaime Camil; Gabriela Vergara
- Music by: Giovanni Arreola; Carlos Tachiquín
- Production companies: Hispana de Producción; Second Try Films
- Distributed by: Warner Bros. Pictures
- Release date: 28 August 2009
- Running time: 111 minutes
- Country: Mexico
- Language: Spanish
- Box office: $2.7 million

I Do ... Knot (Spanish: Recién Cazado) is a 2009 Mexican romantic comedy film directed by Rene Bueno.

== Cast ==
- Jaime Camil as Sebastián.
- Gabriela Vergara as Alexa.
- Rubén Zamora as Esteban.
- Dino Garcia as Daniel.
- Angélica Aragón as the mother of Sebastián.
- Otto Sirgo as the boss and father of Sebastián.
- Verónica Segura as Elvira
- Aylín Mujica as the drunk woman
- Patricia Llaca as the bank teller
