= Cara sucia (TV series) =

- Genre: Telenovela; Romance; Drama
- Created by: Inés Rodena
- Written by: Carlos Romero; Alberto Gómez
- Directed by: Gabriel Walfensao
- Creative director: Arquímedes Rivero
- Starring: Guillermo Dávila; Sonya Smith; Gigi Zanchetta; Adolfo Cubas; Humberto García
- Opening theme: "Antologia de Caricias" by Altamira Banda Show
- Country of origin: Venezuela
- Original language: Spanish
- No. of episodes: 174

Production
- Executive producer: Marisol Campos
- Camera setup: Multi-camera
- Running time: 42–45 minutes
- Production company: Venevisión

Original release
- Network: Venevisión
- Release: March 5 – October 12, 1992

Related
- La gata (1968); La fiera (1983); Rosa salvaje (1987); Por un beso (2000); Pobre diabla (2010); The Stray Cat (2014)

Cara sucia (English title: Dirty Face) is a Venezuelan telenovela written by Carlos Romero and Alberto Gómez and produced by Venevisión in 1992. The telenovela was distributed internationally by Venevisión International and was dubbed into English, Russian, Mongolian, Indonesian, and Tagalog in the Philippines. Guillermo Dávila and Sonya Smith starred as the main protagonists with Gigi Zanchetta and Humberto García as the main antagonists.

== Plot ==
Miguel Ángel González is a member of one of Caracas' richest families while Estrella is a poor but hard-working beautiful girl who sells newspapers in a corner everyday to earn a living. When they meet, they fall in love and begin a beautiful romance that leads to marriage. However, not everything is rosy for the couple. Miguel Ángel's parents Horacio and Rebeca are opposed to the relationship, and the obsessive passion Santa Ortigoza, Miguel Ángel's ex-girlfriend has over him. Horacio's declining mental health makes him become more and more dangerous, and he hides a secret from the past: many years ago, he murdered Estrella's mother because she rejected him and let her father be blamed for the crime. The secret is revealed once Leonardo Montenegro, Estrella's father, is released from prison and reunited with his daughter. Rebeca, Miguel Ángel's mother, begins to accept his relationship with Estrella once she learns about Horacio's secret and that she was wrong about Estrella being a gold digger, when it was actually Santa who was after their family's money.

Later, Horacio kidnaps Estrella and Miguel Ángel's twin boys, and during this time, he has begun loving them like his sons. He falls down an elevator shaft while running away from the police, while Santa commits suicide in a prison bathroom.

== Cast ==
- Guillermo Dávila as Miguel Ángel González De la Vega / Miguel Ángel Guzmán De la Vega
- Sonya Smith as Estrella Montenegro Campuzano / Estrella "Estrellita" Camacho/Estrella Campuzano
- Gigi Zanchetta as Santa Ortigosa Lavarte
- Adolfo Cubas as Antonio González De la Vega
- Humberto García as Horacio González Ferrer
- Eva Blanco as Candelaria Camacho Duval
- Chony Fuentes as Rebeca De la Vega de González
- Elio Rubens as Leonardo Montenegro
- Helianta Cruz as Genoveva "Beba" Lavarte De Ortigoza
- Alberto Marín as Padre Lombarito
- Julio Capote as Fermín
- Marcelo Romo as Carmelo
- Simón Pestana as José Grigorio
- Solmaira Castillo as Deyanira Falcón
- Jenire Blanco
- Elizabeth López as Federica Rangel
- Rita De Gois as Carmen dos Santos
- Marcelo Rodríguez as Agustín dos Santos
- Hans Christopher as Víctor Iriarte
- Mauricio González as Fernando Guzmán
- Miguel Moly
- Chumico Romero
- Alexis Escamez
- Hilda Moreno as Coralia Margarita Blanco
- Coromoto Roche as Teresa
- Deyanira Hernández as Eloisa
- Gonzalo Contreras as Dr. Gordillo
- José A. Urdaneta as Chuito (Jesús Camacho)
- María A. Avallone as Karina González de la Vega
- Enrique Oliveros as Oscar
- Blanquita Vera
- Ana Martínez as Asunción
- Daniel Escamez
- Solmaira Liendo
- Joel de la Rosa as Fabián
- Eduardo Luna as Kirikó (Ángel Vargas López)
- Umberto Buonocuore as Pepino
- Lizbeth Manrique as Loly
- Manolo Manolo as Doctor
- Israel Maranatha as El Gato
- Svenn Luna as Police
- Ileana Jacket as neighbor of Candelaria
- Frank Méndez as Rocky
- Mario Brito as Juan
- Susana Duijm

== Broadcasters ==
Country	Name	Broadcast network	Start date	End date	Day(s) broadcast	Time broadcast
Philippines	Cara Sucia	GMA Network	1999	2000	Monday to Friday	2:30 p.m.
Spain	Cara Sucia	Antena 3	March 15, 1993	October 15, 1993	Monday to Friday	8:00 p.m.
USA	Cara Sucia	Univision	April 13, 1992	November 6, 1992	Monday to Friday	9:00 p.m.
USA	Cara Sucia	UniMás	April 13, 1992	November 6, 1992	Monday to Friday	9:00 p.m.
Mongolia	Cara Sucia	MNB	1994	1995	Monday to Friday	7:00 p.m.
Venezuela	Cara Sucia	Venevisión	March 5, 1992	October 12, 1992	Monday to Saturday	10:00 p.m.
Mexico	Cara Sucia	Televisa Regional	May 11, 1994	November 11, 1994	Monday to Friday	10:00 a.m.
Argentina	Cara Sucia	El Trece	May 7, 1994	November 11, 1994	Monday to Friday	5:00 p.m.
Argentina	Cara Sucia	Telecanal	June 14, 1999	February 4, 1999	Monday to Friday	8:30 p.m.
Paraguay	Cara Sucia	Telefuturo	April 4, 1994	December 9, 1994	Monday to Friday	5:00 p.m.
Paraguay	Cara Sucia	Unicanal	June 14, 1999	February 4, 2000	Monday to Friday	8:30 p.m.
Uruguay	Cara Sucia	Teledoce	April 4, 1994	December 9, 1994	Monday to Friday	5:00 p.m.
Uruguay	Cara Sucia	VTV	June 14, 1999	February 4, 2000	Monday to Friday	8:30 p.m.
Indonesia	Cara Sucia	SCTV	March 21, 1994	August 29, 1994	Monday	11:00 a.m.
Indonesia	Cara Sucia	SCTV	September 1, 1994	September 5, 1995	Monday to Friday	4:00 p.m.
