= Destino de Mujer =

Venezuelan telenovela

- Genre: Telenovela; Romance; Drama
- Created by: Mariela Romero
- Directed by: César Bolívar; Rafael Gómez; Arquímedes Rivero
- Starring: Sonya Smith; Jorge Reyes; Lupita Ferrer
- Opening theme: Para Llorar performed by Ricardo Montaner
- Ending theme: Para Llorar performed by Ricardo Montaner
- Countries of origin: Venezuela; Spain
- Original language: Spanish
- No. of episodes: 136

Production
- Executive producer: Daniel Andrade
- Producer: Sandra Rioboo
- Production locations: Venezuela; Spain
- Editors: Javier Lopez; Jose Guillermo
- Production companies: Venevisión; Televisión Española

Original release
- Network: Venevisión (Venezuela); La Primera (Spain)
- Release: November 27, 1997 – May 26, 1998

Related
- Contra viento y marea; Samantha; Vuélveme a querer (2007)

Destino de mujer (English title: Destiny of a Woman) is a Venezuelan telenovela created by Mariela Romero and produced in 1997 as a joint production of Venevisión and Televisión Española. The telenovela lasted for 136 episodes and was distributed internationally by Venevisión International.

Sonya Smith and Jorge Reyes starred as the main protagonists with Yajaira Orta, Henry Galué, Tatiana Capote, Gabriela Vergara and Rafael Romero as antagonists.

== Plot ==
A murder committed in the past marks the life of Mariana Oropeza and Víctor Manuel Santana, two young people who fall in love without knowing of the past that links them.

Years ago, Alfredo Oropeza killed Victor Manuel's father, stole his fortune and raped his fiancée, Aurora, whom he had always desired. After killing Esteban, Victor Manuel's father, the servants run for their lives together with his little brother Luis Miguel. But as they are being pursued by Alfredo's men, the nanny carrying Luis Miguel falls into a river. Traumatized and half naked, Aurora arrives at a Church calling for help. But her evil sister, Lucrecia, convinces her that everything that is happening was her fault, and has her locked up in a mental asylum. Nine months later, Aurora gives birth to a baby girl called Mariana, the product of her rape. Lucrecia takes away her niece and blackmails Alfredo—whom she has always loved—into marrying her.

Years later, Mariana and Víctor Manuel meet each other after they compete to win for an international business contract. They both cannot ignore the mutual attraction they feel for each other, until Víctor Manuel discovers that Mariana is the daughter of his worst enemy and the murderer of his father. Víctor Manuel decides to take revenge by seducing Mariana, but he cannot imagine that he will end up falling in love with her.

== Cast ==
=== Main cast ===
- Sonya Smith as Mariana Oropeza Castillo
- Jorge Reyes as Víctor Manuel Santana
- Carlos Camacho as Luis Miguel Restrepo
- Lupita Ferrer as Aurora Inés Acosta
- Tatiana Capote as Griselda Ascanio
- Pedro Lander as Ramón Santana
- Gabriela Vergara as Vanessa Medina
- Rafael Romero as Rodolfo Anzola
- Raúl Amundaray as Artemio Ruíz
- Henry Galué as Alfredo Oropeza
- Javier Valcárcel as Juan Félix

=== Supporting cast ===
- Yajaira Orta as Lucrecia Castillo de Oropeza
- Carmen Julia Álvarez as Caridad Tovar
- Chony Fuentes as Irma Santana
- Alberto Álvarez as Humberto Maldonado
- Pedro Martín as Izaguirre
- María Eugenia Penagos as Margarita
- Jalymar Salomon as Martha
- Wanda D'Isidoro as Thaís Santana
- Sonia Villamizar as Nereida Tovar
- Carlos Baute as Pedro José
- Yul Bürkle as Arnaldo
- Roberto Messuti as Augusto Santana
- Jeanette Flores as Mariana Salcedo
- Roberto Lamarca as Ignacio
- Ernesto Balzi
- Alexis Escámez
- Lucio Bueno
- Mario Brito

== Broadcasters ==
Country	Alternate title/Translation	TV network(s)	Series premiere	Series finale	Weekly schedule	Timeslot
Venezuela	Destino de Mujer	Venevisión	1997	1998	Monday to Friday	10:00 pm
Spain	Destino de Mujer	La 1 (Televisión Española)	1998	1999	Monday to Friday	5:10 pm
Paraguay	Destino de Mujer	Canal 13	September 4, 2000	April 6, 2001	Monday to Friday	6:00 pm
Peru	Destino de Mujer	Panamericana TV	September 11, 2000	April 13, 2001	Monday to Friday	7:00 pm
Argentina	Destino de Mujer	Canal 9	October 5, 1998	March 19, 1999	Monday to Friday	4:00 pm
Argentina	Destino de Mujer	360 TV				
Colombia	Destino de Mujer	Canal A	January 5, 1998	May 29, 1998	Monday to Friday	4:15 pm
Uruguay	Destino de Mujer	Canal 10	April 3, 2000	October 6, 2000	Monday to Friday	5:10 pm
Chile	Destino de Mujer	Chilevisión	August 17, 1998	March 6, 1999	Monday to Friday	4:05 pm
Ecuador	Destino de Mujer	TC Television				
Mexico	Destino de Mujer	Galavisión				
United States	Destino de Mujer	Univisión				
Puerto Rico	Destino de Mujer	Telemundo PR				
Dominican Republic	Destino de Mujer	Rahintel				
Poland		Zone Romantica				

== Trivia ==
- This is the third of the four telenovelas (Cristal, Rosangelica, Pecados ajenos) that Sonya Smith and Lupita Ferrer worked together.
- It was remade by Mexican TV network TV Azteca entitled Vuélveme a querer, Sonya Smith also appeared here and she played the role as the heroine's mother.
- This is the reunion of Sonya Smith & Lupita Ferrer with Wanda D'Isidoro, who worked w/ each other in Rosangélica; this is also the reunion project of Smith & Carlos Camacho after Colombian TV series Guajira.
