= Sonya Smith =

American and Venezuelan actress

- Born: Sonya Eleonora Smith; April 23, 1972 (age 54); Philadelphia, Pennsylvania, U.S.
- Citizenship: United States (by birthplace); Venezuelan (from mother)
- Occupation: Actress
- Years active: 1984–present
- Parents: Frederick Smith (father); Ileana Jacquet (mother)

Sonya Eleonora Smith Jacquet ([ˈsonja eleoˈnoɾa (e)smit ((e)smiθ) ʝaˈket], born April 23, 1972) is an American and Venezuelan actress best known for her roles in telenovelas.

== Biography ==
Smith was born in Philadelphia, Pennsylvania, of Venezuelan actress Ileana Jacquet and Frederick Smith, who is American. Her maternal great-grandfather was French and her maternal great-grandmother was Finnish. After her parents divorced, her actress mother along with Smith went back to Venezuela; Smith grew up in Venezuela and identifies herself with the Venezuelan culture. She speaks fluent Spanish, English, and German; the last learned from her mother, a German who grew up in Venezuela. She studied psychology at the Universidad Central de Venezuela.

== Career ==
Her breakthrough came in the early 1990s when she played Estrellita Montenegro, the main character in Cara Sucia, her most successful telenovela as the lead actress. Smith remains a popular actress not only in Venezuela, also in other countries where her telenovelas have shown. In 2006, she returned to telenovelas with Olvidarte Jamás, her biggest hit as the lead actress since Cara Sucia, which was shot in Miami; this is the time where Smith returned to her birth country, but this time in Miami. Later, in 2007, she reappeared in Acorralada, in which she was one of the main stars and which has been a huge success. There, she was Fedora Gaviota.

During 2005, Smith made her Hollywood debut, playing Angela La Salle in Cyxork 7, where she acted alongside Ray Wise; although Smith currently lives in the United States and appeared in a Hollywood film, she still wants to remain more in the Spanish media of the country because the Spanish media opened opportunities for her to fame. In 2007, she participated in another Hollywood film, Ladrón que roba a Ladrón, where she shared credits with actors, Fernando Colunga, Gabriel Soto, Miguel Varoni, and Saúl Lisazo among others. In 2013, she gets another protagonist role in the telenovela "Marido En Alquiler" based on the Brazilian telenovela "Fina Estampa" playing the role of Griselda Carrasco and starring with Juan Soler.

== Filmography ==
=== Film ===
Year	Title	Role	Notes
2006	Cyxork 7	Angela LaSalle	
2007	La misma luna	Sra. Snyder	
2007	Ladrón que roba a ladrón	Veronica Valdez	
2008	I Didn't Know Who I Was	Michelle	Short film
2010	Hunted by Night	Tania	
2012	Unknowns	DA Veronica Riley	
2017	Case Unknown	Claudia Smith	Short film

=== Television roles ===
Year	Title	Role	Notes
1985	Cristal	Maggie	Supporting role
1989	Alondra	Vicentina	Supporting role
1990	Gardenia	Margarita	Supporting role
1991	El desprecio	Violeta Velandró	Supporting role
1992	Cara sucia	Estrella Montenegro	Protagonist
1993	Rosangélica	Rosangélica González Hernández / Elisa Montero	Protagonist
1994	María Celeste	María Celeste Paniagua	Protagonist
1996	Guajira	Sonia Arbeláez	Protagonist
1997	Destino de Mujer	Mariana Oropeza	Protagonist
1999	Mariú	Coralia Lozada de Gálvez	Co-protagonist
2000	Milagros	Milagros De La Torre Vargas / Chachita Vargas	Protagonist
2006	Olvidarte jamás	Luisa Domínguez / Victoria Salinas	Protagonist
2007	Acorralada	Fedora "La Gaviota" Garcés Ledezma	Co-protagonist
2007	Tiempo Final	Claudia	Episode: Falso cura
2007–08	Pecados ajenos	Elena Sandoval	Main Antagonist
2009	Vuélveme a querer	Liliana Acosta	Supporting role
2010	¿Dónde está Elisa?	Dana Riggs	Protagonist
2010–11	Aurora	Ángela Amenábar	Protagonist
2012	Corazón valiente	Isabel Uriarte de Arroyo	Special participation
2012	Secreteando	Marisol	Main cast member
2012	Relaciones Peligrosas	Lucrecia	Guest appearance
2013–14	Marido en alquiler	Griselda Carrasco	Protagonist
2014–15	Tierra de reyes	Cayetana Belmonte Vda. de Del Junco	Main Antagonist / Co-protagonist
2016	Las Princesas	Dolores Villanueva	Antagonist
2016	Off Script	Dolores	
2017	Milagros de Navidad	Soledad	Episode: "Adiós soledad" Protagonist
2018	Mi familia perfecta	Dakota Johnson	Antagonist
2018–21	Falsa identidad	Fernanda Virrueta López	Co-protagonist
2021–22	Si nos dejan	Guest Speaker	Guest; episode 83
2022	Repatriated	April	Supporting role
2023	4Ever	Paulina	Supporting role
2025	Velvet: El nuevo imperio	Pilar Márquez	

=== Theater ===
Year	Title	Role	Notes
2012	Las Hijas		
2012	Monologando		
2017	Mujeres Infieles		
2019	Divinas		

== Awards ==
- Latin Pride National Awards (for Outstanding Woman Achievement, 2008)
- Miami Life Award (2011)
- Latino Wall Street Award (Reconocimiento a la Trayectoria Artística, 2024)
