= Gabriela Vergara =

Venezuelan actress and model

- Born: Gabriela Vergara Aranguren; May 29, 1974 (age 52)
- Occupations: Actress, Model
- Years active: 1997–present
- Modeling information
- Height: 1.72 m (5 ft 7 1/2 in)

Gabriela Vergara Aranguren (born May 29, 1974 in Caracas, Venezuela) is an actress and model. She is best known as the 3rd runner-up in Miss Venezuela 1996.

== Biography ==
In 1997, she started acting in many telenovelas like Destino de Mujer as Vanessa and in 2004, La Mujer en el Espejo as Barbara Montesinos de Mutti.

She gave birth to two twin girls in April, 2009. Their names are Alessandra and Emiliana.

== Filmography ==
=== Television ===
- Juego de mentiras (2023) as Eva Rojas
- Amores que engañan ( 2022) as Magsalena Diaz
- The Other Side Of The Wall (2018) as Paula Duarte
- El Comandante (2017) as Marisabel Rodríguez de Chávez
- Las Amazonas (2016) as Debórah Piñero Villarreol de Santos / Eugenia Villarroel (Lead Antagonist)
- Quererte Así (2012) as Marisela Santos / Isadora
- Cielo Rojo (2011) as Aleida Ramos (Villain)
- Prófugas del Destino (2010) as Lola (Main Protagonist)
- Mujer Comprada (2009) as Laura
- Secretos del Alma (2008) as Denisse Junot
- Amas de Casa Desesperadas (2008) as Roxana Guzman (Edie Britt)
- Puras Joyitas (2007) as La Chica
- Seguro y Urgente (2006–2007) as Usmail Irureta
- Decisiones (2006–2007) as Erika Pardo
- El amor no tiene precio (2005) as Ivana
- La Tormenta (2005) as Ariana Santino Castell
- La mujer en el espejo (2004) as Barbara Montesinos de Mutti
- Belinda (2004) as Cristina and Belinda Romero
- La Hija del Jardinero (2003) as Jennifer de la Vega
- Trapos Íntimos (2002) as Lucia Lobo
- Mambo y Canela (2002)
- Felina (2001) as Daniela
- Toda Mujer (1999) as Manuela Mendoza Castillo
- El País de las mujeres (1998) as Almendra Sanchez
- Destino de Mujer (1997) as Vanessa

=== Film ===
- Relatos Del Exilio ( 2023)
- He matado a mi marido ( 2018)
- Locos y Peligrosos (2016)
- I Do ... Knot (2009) as Alexa
- 13 Segundos (2007) as Claudia
