= Vanessa Pose =

Venezuelan actress (born 1990)

- Born: Vanessa Gabriela Pose; March 12, 1990 (age 35); Caracas, Venezuela
- Occupation: Actress
- Years active: 2005-present
- Spouse: Pedro Romero (m. 2012)
- Partner: Eugenio Siller (2009−2011)
- Children: 1

Vanessa Gabriela Pose Levy (born March 12, 1990) is a Venezuelan actress.

== Biography ==
Her father is Uruguayan and her mother is Cuban. She has a twin brother named Andrés and an older brother named Alejandro. She reunited in 2011 with childhood friend and now businessman from Venezuela Pedro Romero. They got married in 2012 and she gave birth to a baby girl in 2014.

== Career ==
Pose had her first role in Con toda el Alma in 2005 as Maria Victoria Serrano and Camila Villafane as the Main Antagonist for the first 2 seasons she then departed from the series and Lorena Alvardo as Leticia La Madrid took her place for the third season, in 2006-2010 she appeared in Voltea pa' que te enamores, as Algeria Guzman until the show ended with a fifth season. In 2010 she got a role in Donde esta elisa as the Titular Protagonist she announced her departure in mid 2010 but the series still went on. In 2010-2011 she played Victoria "Vicky" hutton Miller in Aurora. In 2012- 2013 she played Emma Arroyo as the Co-Protagonist in Corazon Valiente later that year she departed from the series but came back in 2013 for the series finale. In 2013 she was supposed to play Patricia Ibarra on Marido en Alquiler but her pregnancy was unexpected and Kimberly Dos Ramos took the role instead but she did special guest star on the series.

== Filmography ==
=== Films ===
Year	Series	Character	Notes
2008	Juego	Jennifer Carrasco	Main Protagonist
2009	Juego 2	Jennifer Carrasco	Main Protagonist
2011	La Diabla Diosa	Candice	Supporting Cast
2016	Juego 3	Veronica Havana/Jennifer Carrasco	Main Protagonist.

=== Telenovelas ===
Year	Series	Character	Notes
2005-2006	Con Toda el alma	Maria Victoria Serrano/Camila Villafane	Main Antagonist Main Cast;Seasons 1-2
2006-2010	Voltea pa' que te enamores	Alegria Guzman	Main Cast; Seasons 1-5
2010	¿Dónde Está Elisa?	Elisa Altamira Riggs	Titular Protagonist
2010-2011	Aurora	Victoria "Vicky" Hutton Miller/Aurora Ponce De Leon/Vanessa Miller(young)	Main Protagonist
2012-2013	Corazon Valiente	Emma Arroyo/Emma Ferrara	Main Protagonist
2017	Jenni Rivera: Mariposa de Barrio	Chiquis Rivera	Main Protagonist

=== Webnovelas ===
Year	Series	Character	Place
2011	Y Vuelvo a Ti	Marisela	Protagonist
