= Pablo Azar =

Mexican actor

- Born: Pablo Alberto Azar Olagaray; July 27, 1982 (age 44); Mexico City, D.F., Mexico
- Occupations: Actor and painter
- Years active: Since 2000
- Spouse: Claudia Caidedo (2010–2015)

Pablo Alberto Azar Olagaray (born July 27, 1982) is a Mexican actor.

== Personal life ==
Azar is an international actor and painter.

Azar was born in Mexico City and currently lives in the United States.

== Charity work ==
In 2013, Azar teamed up with and posed in an ad campaign for PETA, speaking out against animal cruelty in circuses and bullfights and asking fans to never attend either.

== Filmography ==
=== Films ===
Year	Title	Role	Notes
2005	Tres	Chris Aiken	
2015	Sueño en Coma: Coma Dream	Pablo	Short film
2017	Mismatch Made in Heaven	Seth	Short film

=== Television ===
Year	Title	Role	Notes
2000	El amor no es como lo pintan	Popo	
2001	Como en el cine	Arturo	
2002	Sin permiso de tus padres	Unknown role	
2003	Dos chicos de cuidado en la ciudad	Unknown role	
2004	Soñarás	Tomás	
2004	La vida es una canción	Unknown role	
2005	Top Models	Estilísta	1 episode
2005	El cuerpo del deseo	Simón Domínguez	
2006	Marina	Papalote	
2007	Bajo las riendas del amor	Daniel Linares	
2007	Decisiones	Samuel	Episode: "Culpa ajena"
2007	Decisiones de mujeres	Ángel Paez	Episode: "Clínica del sexo"
2008	El Juramento	Juan Pablo Robles Conde	
2010	Bella calamidades	Renato Galeano	
2010	Aurora	César Lobos	
2011	Sacrificio de mujer	Enzo Talamonti	
2012	El Talismán	Armando Nájera	
2012	Corazón valiente	Gustavo Ponte	
2012	Lynch	El Chiqui Forlano	Episode: "Apuestas de familia"
2013	Marido en alquiler	Rafael Álamo	
2014	Reina de corazones	Juan José "Juanjo" García	
2016	Hasta que te conocí	Young Gabriel Aguilera	Episode: "El recién llegado"
2016	Wrecked	Pablo	3 episodes
2016	Noches con Platanito	Himself	Special guest
2017	La fan	Benicio Torres	
2019–2020	Henry Danger	Juantonio Cruzeras (voice) (Season 5, Episode 38)	Episodes: "Part 2: A New Darkness", "The Fate of Danger Part 1"
2022	Arelys Hanao	Pancho Fernandez	
2025	I Am Not Mendoza	Fermín El Alacran	Episode 1
2025	Your Husband is Mine	Martin	
2026	Nurse the Dead	Atzin Castañeda	
