= Michelle Posada =

Venezuelan actress and restaurateur

- Occupation: Actress

Michelle Posada is a Venezuelan actress and restaurateur. She is portrayed the character of "Estela" in nine episodes of the telenovela "Bajo el mismo cielo" which aired in the United States on the Telemundo Network from 2015-16. She has also appeared in "Las Caras del Diablo 2" (2014), "El Psiquiatra" (2014), "Escandalos: Todo es real excepto sus nombres" (2015), "La Banda" (2011) and "Ruta 35" (2016).

== Career ==
Posada began acting at 12 and studied in both Venezuela and Miami, where she moved in 2013.

Posada is also a restaurateur. In 2017 she opened a restaurant in Miami dedicated to healthy eating. The restaurant's name is derived from her nickname, "Michi."

=== Filmography ===
==== Television ====
Year	Title	Role	Notes
2011	La Banda	Lita	Episode dated 4 July 2011
2014	Las Caras del Diablo 2	Prostitute	
2014	El Psiquiatra	Lawyer 2	
2014	Voltea Pa'Que Te Enamores	Teacher	Episode 1.1
2015	Escandalos: Todo es real excepto sus nombres	Journalist	Episode titled "La Belleza Interior"
2015-16	Bajo el mismo cielo	Estela	Nine episodes
2016	Ruta 35	Secretary	Episode 1.1
2019	Betty en NY	Aracely	Episode 1.104 Episode 1.97
