= Sabrina Seara =

Venezuelan telenovela actress (born 1985)

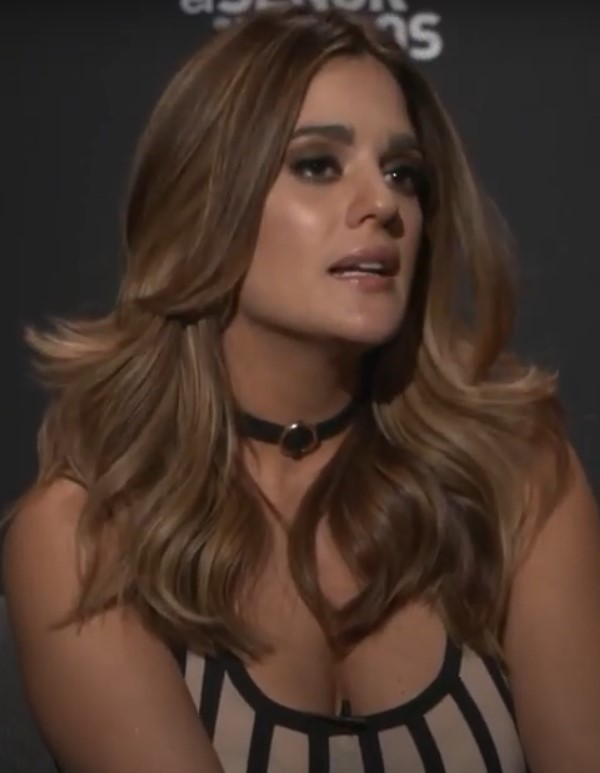
- Seara in 2018
- Born: Sabrina Seara Parra; March 27, 1985 (age 40); Caracas, Venezuela
- Occupation: Actress
- Spouse: Daniel Elbittar (m. 2014)
- Children: 2

Sabrina Seara Parra (born 27 March 1985 in Caracas, Venezuela) is a Venezuelan telenovela actress.

== Biography ==
From a young age, Sabrina developed an interest in acting and modelling. At the age of 16, she enrolled for acting classes in RCTV's 1BC academy with Professor Ralph Kinnard as her instructor.

After finishing her studies at the Marbe de la Castellana college in Caracas, she obtained her first protagonist role in the television series Guayoyo Express produced by Televen. In 2009, Sabrina moved to Venezuelan channel Venevisión to star as the protagonist in the telenovela Los misterios del amor. In 2010, she interpreted her first antagonist role in the telenovela Harina de Otro Costal.

Her breakthrough role came in 2012 when she starred in the successful telenovela by Venevisión titled Válgame Dios. She then moved to the United States to participate in Telemundo's Pasión Prohibida alongside fellow Venezuelan Mónica Spear.

Sabrina will portray the main villain in Televen's upcoming telenovela Señor de los cielos Nora, La Emprendedora.

In 2020 she became a US citizen.

== Filmography ==
=== Films ===
Year	Title	Role	Notes
2007	13 segundos	Daniela	Debut film

=== Television ===
Year	Title	Role	Notes
2005	Guayoyo Express	María Fernanda	Main role
2007	El gato tuerto	María Amatista "Mati"	Recurring role
2008–09	Isa TKM	Marina Pasquali	Recurring role
2009	Los misterios del amor	Francisca Naranjo	Main role
2012	Válgame Dios	Yamilet López	Main role
2013	Pasión prohibida	Penélope Santillana	Main cast
2014	Nora	Melisa Lobo	Main cast
2015–17	El Señor de los Cielos	Esperanza Salvatierra	Recurring role (Season 3); Main cast (Seasons 4–5); 201 episodes
2017	Milagros de Navidad	Carol Smith	Episode: "In-feliz Navidad"
2018	Mi familia perfecta	Erika Ramírez	Main role
2019	Betty en NY	Marcela Valencia	Main cast
2022	Los ricos también lloran	Vivian	Guest star
2024	El amor no tiene receta	Berenice	

== Accolades ==
Year	Association	Category	Work	Result	Ref.
2016	Premios Tu Mundo	Favorite Actress	El Señor de los Cielos	Won	
