= Marianela Rodriguez =

- Born: Marianela Rodriguez; June 16, 1991 (age 34); Santa Clara, Cuba
- Height: 5 ft 3 in (160 cm)

Marianela Rodriguez (born June 16, 1991, in Santa Clara, Cuba) is a beauty queen, model and actress from Cuba who came to the spotlight after working for Univision Venevision Studios El Talisman, soap opera, recorded in Florida. These days, Rodriguez maintains beauty blog on the popular social networks including Instagram, YouTube, and Facebook.

== Personal life ==
She was the daughter of Marianela Rodriguez I, who was a journalist and presenter. The actress attended a private high school where she graduated with honors later getting the degree in the Communication Arts at the private Catholic university of St. Thomas situated in Florida. At the age of three she began taking ballet classes in Santa Clara, Cuba, finishing five years later. Rodriguez was raised in her early years at CMHW in Santa Clara Cuba. One year after enrolling in classical ballet classes Rodriguez was chosen to be in La Colmenita, theatrical group for children who sang, danced, acted.

== Television ==
Marianela began working in Television in the United States of America at the age of 10. Years before that she had attended several acting academies in Florida and Nevada. Recently she graduated from her 6th acting school, Tu Escenario. Marianela also participated in many commercials including campaigns with Angelica Vale for Premio Lo Nuestro 2011 as well as in commercials for Premios Juventud. Commercials that were aired nationally and internationally by the largest Hispanic television network Univision.
