= Javier Valcárcel =

Cuban actor

- Born: Havana, Cuba
- Other names: Javier Valcalser, Javier Valcarcel
- Occupation: actor
- Years active: 1990 - present

Javier Inocente Pérez Torres (born September 23, 1969), better known as Javier Valcárcel, is a Cuban actor. He was born in Havana. He made his debut in 1990 in the play Las Criadas by Jean Genet. In 1992 he participated in Divina Obsesión, opening the way for telenovelas.

== Career ==
After its debut on TV participates in soap operas: Bit of heaven and anyone Cruz. In 1996 he participated in "The forgiveness of sins". Followed by "Sin of Love", "Target Women", "All Woman" and "Little Women." Some of his plays are: Box office for unspoken words, "The girl blue jeans" and "The Pelikano".

== Filmography ==
Year	Project	Role
1992	Divina Obsesión	Guaguancó
1993	Pedacito de Cielo	Homero
1994	Cruz de nadie	Augusto Antúnez protagonista/ Lucino Antúnez coprotagonista
1996	El perdón de los pecados	Efraín Ramos protagonista
1996	Pecado de amor	Junior - contrafigura
1997	Destino de mujer	Juan Félix
1999	Toda mujer	Gustavo Mendoza Castillo
1999	Mujercitas	Capitán Felipe Zubillán contrafigura
2000	Amantes de Luna Llena	Kiko
2001	Felina	Segundo Contreras
2002	Juana la virgen	Alejandro
2002	Lejana como el viento	Efraín
2002	Tosca, la verdadera historia	Spoleta
2003	La cuaima	Cruz Esteban Guédez
2005	Mujer con pantalones	José Gregorio 'Goyo' Lisboa
2005	Amor a Palos	Chorlito
2007	El gato tuerto	Ignacio contrafigura
2008	Isa TKM	Júlio Silva
2013	Santa Diabla	Francisco 'Pancho' Robledo
2014	Demente Criminal	
2016	Silvana sin Lana	Dominique
2019	Betty in Ny	Guest
2021	Sombras tv Series	Main cast
