= Jamie Sasson =

Venezuelan actress and model

Jamie Sasson is a Venezuelan actress and model who has worked in theater and TV since the age of eight and is currently living in Miami.

Among her latest works are the role of Paula Uriarte in Corazón Valiente, a Telemundo Studios production, and Erinnia in Erinnia, a series of interactive videos produced as an advertising and branding project for Fiat.

== Career ==
At the age of eight Sasson started to study acting in Caracas, Venezuela, in a workshop for children at the Ateneo de Caracas, where she performed her first theater play at the Sala Ana Julia Rojas. Soon after she obtained a scholarship at the voice and dancing school Las Voces Blancas de Elisa Soteldo. Due to the lack of permanent acting schools for children, her mother created an acting and dancing school and theater company for children, first located at the Rafael Guinand Theater and then at the Teatro Chacaíto, where Sasson spent years not only studying, but also working at the academy's plays and was invited to participate in theatrical productions with other theater companies for children. Sasson moved to Europe with her family, where she continued with her secondary school studies and focused on her dancing training with Mario Kitt in Zürich, Switzerland; then in one of her trips to Caracas she became part of the theater company Contrajuego's second workshop for actors, and she had the experience of acting in a classical play, of which she became a recurrent actress when subsequent visits to Caracas took place. Her next step is to work in Madrid as a model and continue acting in shows like El Comisario, Telecinco. Sasson went back to Venezuela, where she was the face of different advertising campaigns and started working in theater plays such as La Última Pasión del Cine and Cortocircuito and became part of Televen's soap opera El Gato Tuerto. After that experience she went to Colombia and became "Erinnia" in the Internet project "Erinnia". Subsequently, she moved to Miami and participated in the soap opera Corazón Valiente of Telemundo network.
