= Nora (TV series) =

Venezuelan telenovela

- Genre: Telenovela
- Created by: Ibsen Martínez
- Screenplay by: Carlos Roa; Karin Valecillos; Freddy Goncalve
- Directed by: Henry Colmenares; Jorge Ríos Villanueva; Roberto Flores
- Creative director: Clelly Arevalo
- Starring: Carla Giraldo; Andrés Zúñiga; Sabrina Seara; Eduardo Victoria; Alberto Zeni; Daniel Lugo; Flor Núñez
- Original language: Spanish
- No. of episodes: 72

Production
- Executive producer: Igor Manrique
- Producers: Hernando Faria; Marco Godoy
- Cinematography: Joseduardo Tovar; Willie Balcazar
- Editors: Cacho Briceño; Ray Suárez; Alexis Gil
- Camera setup: Multi-camera
- Production companies: Cadena Tres; Televen

Original release
- Network: Televen
- Release: September 1 – December 8, 2014

Nora is a Venezuelan telenovela written by Ibsen Martínez for Televen in co-production with Telemundo and Cadena Tres. Carla Giraldo and Andrés Zúñiga star as the main protagonists with Sabrina Seara as the antagonist.

== Synopsis ==
The determination of Latin American women to overcome adversity is the driving force behind NORA, a beautiful and simple young woman of popular extraction, but determined to excel. The eldest of four siblings - all sons of different men - she is concerned that they will get better and take care of her mother Belen, who has fallen into depression and addictions due to the bitter setbacks to her fortune. Nora Acevedo performs the terrible ritual of visiting Mayimbe, her brother who is a prisoner. Fate wants a scandalous prison riot during that visit, something that will change her life. Nora is kidnapped by Mingo Vidal, the inmates' leader, to use her as a bargaining chip in the conflict with Daniel Moros, an important prison commissioner and the girl's boyfriend. In the conflict, Nora meets Félix Villamil -like Villasmil, but without the inserted "S"-, a mysterious prisoner with brilliant computer skills and a magician in disguise, who has been chosen by a dark power to be released in exchange for doing an undisclosed job. Villamil falls in love with the young woman and, contrary to the designs of all the dark threads moving around the riot, takes her with him on his escape, to protect her and save her life. Nora is surprised by the charming stranger. Though it's hard to admit, the episode has changed her. The prestigious and impeccable Daniel Moros detects him and begins to develop dangerous obsessive nuances in his love for the girl. The relationship is no longer the same. In the same city, but in a very different social stratum, the captain of the company Otoniel Lobo and his daughter Melisa operate. For Otoniel it is a painful frustration to see that the heiress to his fortune does not wear the shoes of his leadership. He judges her frivolous and spoiled; while Melisa bitterly suffers from her father's lack of love, not finding a place for her. As he approaches old age, Otoniel feels the urge to find a daughter he once denied and who is none other than Nora. Will she be the Bloodwolf's heir to lead ambitious projects? Nora cannot decide between pursuing her life's goals or succumbing to the charms of the kindly Robin Hood bully played by Felix Villamil. Daniel has been a good man and doesn't deserve to be betrayed. Or is it that Commissioner Moros is not what everyone thinks? But all these characters and many more will find themselves - and collide - under the roof of O'Lobo Enterprises, where two sisters who don't know each other will fall in love with the same man, someone who runs from both sides of the law, determined to wash his name away to deserve NORA. A story of overwhelming powers, threatening to mercilessly trample on an explosive feeling, which cannot be hidden.

== Cast ==
Actor	Character
Carla Giraldo	Nora Acevedo "La emprendedora"
Andrés Zúñiga	Félix Villamil
Sabrina Seara	Melisa Lobos
Eduardo Victoria	Daniel Moros
Claudia La Gatta	Irina Casados
Alberto Zeni	Aurelio
Luciana Silveyra	Flor Elena
Flor Núñez	Belén Rojas
Oriana Colmenares	Minnesota
Miguel Ángel Tovar	Douglas
Alexander Leterni	Ronald
Lili Taravela	Manuela Moros
Dayra Lambis	Vicky
Carlos Cruz	Raúl
Sonia Villamizar	Aída
Iván Tamayo	Mingo
Daniel Lugo	Otoniel Lobo
Gabriel López	Guillermo
