= Felina (TV series) =

- Created by: Vivel Nouel
- Written by: José Luis Contreras
- Directed by: Luis Manzo
- Starring: Gabriela Vergara; Guillermo Dávila; Fedra López; Arnaldo André
- Opening theme: "Felina" by Guillermo Dávila
- Country of origin: Venezuela
- Original language: Spanish
- No. of episodes: 120

Production
- Executive producers: Miguel Villasmil; Igor Manrique
- Cinematography: Jesús Méndez
- Production company: Venevisión

Original release
- Network: Venevisión
- Release: March 28 – July 23, 2001

Felina is a 2001 Venezuelan telenovela produced by Venevisión and distributed by Venevisión International. The telenovela was written by Vivel Nouel and stars Gabriela Vergara and Guillermo Dávila as the main protagonists.

== Plot ==
Daniela is a beautiful young woman with a fierce personality to fight for justice that has led her to get into trouble since childhood. After constantly getting into trouble with the authorities of the town, she decides to move to the capital city to start a new life. There she will meet Abel, a nice and unusual man with whom they will form an unusual relationship.

== Cast ==
- Gabriela Vergara-- Daniela
- Guillermo Dávila-- Abel
- Fedra López-- Mara
- Arnaldo André-- Asdrúbal
- Miriam Ochoa-- Estefanía
- Jorge Palacios-- Bernardo
- Ana Castell-- Yarima
- Olga Henríquez-- María del Valle
- Laura Brey -
- Belén Peláez-- Lily
- Javier Valcárcel-- Segundo
- Sonia Villamizar-- Tatiana
- Lourdes Martínez-- Lissette
- Judith Vásquez-- Leticia
- Saúl Martínez-- Bruno
- Roque Valero-- Agapito
- Flavia Gleske-- Lula
- Eva Blanco-- Margot
- José Oliva-- Don Atilio
- José Rubens-- Leonardo
- Esther Orjuela-- Rosario
- Karen Bendayan-- Lucero
- Patty Oliveros-- Laurita
- Flor Karina Zambrano-- Victoria
- Verushka Scalia-- Sugeidi
- Pedro Padrino-- Florentino Cueva
