= Marido en alquiler =

- Created by: Perla Farías
- Based on: Fina Estampa by Aguinaldo Silva
- Written by: Basilio Álvarez; Iralyn Valera
- Directed by: Claudio Callao; Nicolás Di Blasi
- Starring: Sonya Smith; Juan Soler; Maritza Rodríguez; Roberto Manrique; Gabriel Coronel; Kimberly Dos Ramos; Ricardo Chávez; Miguel Varoni
- Music by: Vinicio Ludovic; Alberto Slezynger; Alexis Estiz
- Country of origin: United States
- Original language: Spanish
- No. of episodes: 141

Production
- Executive producer: David Posada
- Producer: Aimee Godinez
- Cinematography: Miguel Font; Juan Pablo Puentes; José Luis Velarde
- Editor: Hader Antivar Duque
- Camera setup: Multi-camera
- Running time: 48–52 minutes (eps 1–7); 42–45 minutes (eps 8–70, 101–139); 84–87 minutes (eps 71–100 & 140–141)
- Production companies: Telemundo Studios; Rede Globo de Televisão

Original release
- Network: Telemundo
- Release: July 10, 2013 – January 13, 2014

Related
- Fina Estampa

Marido en alquiler is an American telenovela premiered on Telemundo on July 10, 2013, and concluded on January 13, 2014. The telenovela is created by the Venezuelan author Perla Farías, based on the Brazilian drama written by Aguinaldo Silva, entitled Fina Estampa. Produced by Telemundo Studios and Rede Globo de Televisão, and distributed by Telemundo Internacional.

It stars Sonya Smith as Griselda Carrasco — A woman who is dedicated to the business of repairing cars and appliances, and striving to ensure that her children have a better future, along with Juan Soler, Maritza Rodríguez, Roberto Manrique, Gabriel Coronel, Kimberly Dos Ramos, Ricardo Chávez, and Miguel Varoni.

== Plot ==
Griselda Carrasco (Sonya Smith) is a middle-aged handywoman in a working class community. She takes care of her three kids and grandson after José Antonio (Miguel Varoni), her husband, disappeared at sea 15 years ago.

Needing to support her family, Griselda takes on a job doing what she knows best: Fixing the crumbling neighborhood with her trusty toolbox while traveling in her van. She becomes the friendly neighborhood "Husband for Hire."

One day while driving around Miami in her van, she happens to meet Reinaldo (Juan Soler), a charming man whose car has just gotten a flat tire. Seeing Reinaldo struggling with the situation, she jumps out of her van and quickly runs over to him and fixes his flat, offering him her business card. Griselda subsequently meets Teresa Cristina (Maritza Rodríguez), a lady of elegant manners, smug, capable of committing the worst follies and married to Reinaldo, famous chef of the restaurant Gourmet Palmer. A kind-hearted man who lacks mechanical skills, Reinaldo will be intrigued, if not spellbound, before Griselda, the woman who can fix anything very quickly.

Griselda is unaware that Antonio (Gabriel Coronel), her son, is the boyfriend of Patricia (Kimberly Dos Ramos), the daughter of Reinaldo and Teresa Cristina, who will eventually become their worst enemy. To her great surprise – and disappointment – she discovers that Antonio presented to his future in-laws a certain Giselle (Elluz Peraza), an actress hired to pretend to be Antonio's mother (Antonio is pretending to come from an upper-class family and doesn't want his girlfriend to know the real story).

Griselda's fortune changes overnight when she wins the jackpot of the lottery: $43 million. From then on her life will not be the same, although she stands firm in her beliefs and values. With a new look, "La Carrasco" creates the "Maridos de Alquiler" network, although her fortune also attracts a few interested parties, starting with José Antonio (Miguel Varoni), who rises from the dead when he learns that his wife is now a multimillionaire.

To the misfortune of Teresa Cristina, Griselda moves to a mansion in the same luxurious area, and Teresa Cristina must now tolerate the person she most despises as her neighbor. Teresa Cristina declares war on Griselda, without imagining that Reinaldo, tired of her lies, will abandon her to pursue Griselda, with whom he has fallen deeply in love. With Griselda, the handsome chef will be reunited with the values of friendship, love and family.

== Production ==
Aguinaldo Silva, author of the Brazilian original Fina Estampa, will be supervising adaptation and screenplay for Telemundo together with Perla Farías. As of July 21, 2012, the adaptation is ongoing. Mr. Silva is best known for incredible rating successes such as Roque Santeiro in the 80s, and Vale Tudo adapted in the 2000s by Telemundo as Vale todo.

The working title in TV Globo for Fina Estampa in Brazil was Marido de Aluguel, however, it was later changed. For Telemundo's version, it used the Marido de Aluguel name, though it translated it in Spanish.

== Opening credits and theme ==
Latin Grammy award winner Ana Bárbara performs the soap opera's theme song Yo Soy La Mujer. The singer also participated in the soap opera. Yo Soy La Mujer is also the title to Ana Barbara's eleventh studio album. The track Yo Soy La Mujer was re-recorded in Banda and became part of Ana Bárbara's music repertoire. The song was inspired by the hard work, struggle, and immense effort put forth by Griselda Carrasco as a single parent to support her three children and grandson.

Also part of the opening theme is the song by Carlos Gatica, called Como te explico, a love song inspired by Reinaldo and Griselda.

== Cast and characters ==
- Sonya Smith as Griselda Carrasco, a hardworking and humble woman who is dedicated to working as a handyman to keep a family of three children and one grandchild after her husband was lost at sea 15 years ago. She later falls in love with Reinaldo.
- Juan Soler as Reinaldo Ibarra, a culinary art lover who works as the chef of a famous restaurant. He is the ex-husband of Teresa Cristina and the father of Patricia. He later falls in love with Griselda.
- Maritza Rodríguez as Teresa Cristina Palmer, a materialistic and snobbish woman who killed her biological mother after discovering she was a maid. She despises Griselda. She's Reinaldo's ex-wife and Patricia's mother.
- Miguel Varoni as José Salinas Carrasco, Griselda's ex-husband and father of Antonio, Kike and Amalia. Teresa Cristina's lover.
- Roberto Manrique as José Enrique "Kike" Salinas Carrasco, Griselda's eldest son and Kikito's father. Bárbara's Boyfriend. He works at a taco bar to help support his mother and young son. Kike is an exemplary father and he strives to keep Kikito happy.
- Gabriel Coronel as José Antonio Salinas Carrasco, Griselda's son, the only one of the three who could enter the university. He's ambitious and despises living in poverty, and is ashamed of his humble origins. In love with Patricia.
- Kimberly Dos Ramos as Patricia Ibarra Palmer Carrasco, Teresa Cristina and Reinaldo's daughter. A humble girl a special relationship with her father, a closeness that is not shared with her mother. In love with Antonio.
- Ricardo Chávez as Gabriel Rodríguez, owner of a Mexican taco bar. He is a hard worker and is deeply in love with Griselda.

== Awards and nominations ==
Year	Award	Category	Nominated	Result
2013	Premios People en Español			
2013	Premios People en Español	Best Telenovela	Perla Farías	Nominated
2013	Premios People en Español	Best Actress	Sonya Smith	Nominated
2013	Premios People en Español	Best Actor	Juan Soler	Nominated
2013	Premios People en Español	Best Supporting Actress	Kimberly Dos Ramos	Nominated
2013	Premios People en Español	Best Female Antagonist	Maritza Rodríguez	Won
2013	Premios People en Español	Best New Talent	Kimberly Dos Ramos	Nominated
2013	Premios People en Español	Best New Talent	Gabriel Coronel	Nominated
2013	Special Beauty Awards	Trainee Beauty TV	Kimberly Dos Ramos	Won
2013	Special Beauty Awards	Youth TV Guy	Pablo Azar	Won
2014	Miami Life Award			
2014	Miami Life Award	Best Telenovela	Perla Farias	Won
2014	Miami Life Award	Best Actress	Sonya Smith	Won
2014	Miami Life Award	Best actor	Juan Soler	Won
2014	Miami Life Award	Best Supporting Actress	Maritza Rodriguez	Won
2014	Miami Life Award	Best Supporting Actor	Ricardo Chávez	Nominated
2014	Miami Life Award	Best Supporting Actor	Ariel Texido	Nominated
2014	Miami Life Award	Best Supporting Actor	Paulo Quevedo	Nominated
2014	Miami Life Award	Best First Actress	Alba Roversi	Won
2014	Miami Life Award	Best First Actor	Miguel Varoni	Won
2014	Miami Life Award	Best Young Actress	Kimberly Dos Ramos	Won
2014	Miami Life Award	Best Young Actress	Daniela Navarro	Nominated
2014	Miami Life Award	Best Young Actress	Ana Carolina Grajales	Nominated
2014	Miami Life Award	Best Young Actor	Pablo Azar	Nominated
2014	Miami Life Award	Best Young Actor	Roberto Manrique	Won
2014	Miami Life Award	Best Young Actor	Gabriel Coronel	Nominated
2014	Premios Tu Mundo			
2014	Premios Tu Mundo	Novela of the Year	Perla Farias	Nominated
2014	Premios Tu Mundo	Favorite Lead Actress	Sonya Smith	Nominated
2014	Premios Tu Mundo	The Best Bad Boy	Miguel Varoni	Nominated
2014	Premios Tu Mundo	The Best Bad Girl	Maritza Rodríguez	Nominated
2014	Premios Tu Mundo	The Perfect Couple	Sonya Smith and Juan Soler	Nominated
2014	Premios Tu Mundo	Best Supporting Actress	Daniela Navarro	Won
2014	Premios Tu Mundo	Best Supporting Actor	Ariel Texido	Nominated
2014	Premios Tu Mundo	Best Supporting Actor	Gabriel Coronel	Won
2014	Premios Tu Mundo	Best Supporting Actor	Ricardo Chávez	Nominated
2014	Premios Tu Mundo	First Actress	Alba Roversi	Nominated
2014	Premios Tu Mundo	Junior Favorite Artist	Kimberly Dos Ramos	Won
2014	Premios Tu Mundo	Best Bad Luck Moment	When you have a flat tire truck	Nominated
2014	Premios Tu Mundo	!Qué papacito!	Gabriel Coronel	Won
2014	Premios Tu Mundo	I'm Sexy and I know it	Daniela Navarro	Nominated
