= Corazón valiente =

Spanish-language telenovela

- Genre: Telenovela
- Created by: Marcela Citterio
- Written by: Juan Marcos Blanco; Marcela Citterio; Marisa Milanesio; Claudia Morales
- Directed by: Ricardo Schwarz; Claudio Callao; Arturo Manuitt; Danny Gavidia; Luis Manzo
- Starring: Adriana Fonseca; José Luis Reséndez; Aylín Mújica; Ximena Duque; Fabián Ríos; Vanessa Pose; Jon-Michael Ecker; Sonya Smith; Jorge Luis Pila; Manuel Landeta; Katie Barberi; Leonardo Daniel; Gilda Haddock; Gabriel Valenzuela; José Guillermo Cortines; Tatiana Capote; Alejandro López; Lino Martone; Roberto Plantier; Priscila Perales; Ahrid Hannaley; Briggitte Bozzo; Nicole Arci; Carolina Tejera; Gabriel Porras; Brenda Asnicar; Angeline Moncayo; Alba Roversi; Daniela Navarro; Pablo Azar; Gregorio Pernía; Miguel Varoni
- Theme music composer: Alberto Slezynger; Vinicio Ludovic
- Opening theme: "Corazón valiente" by Flora Ciarlo
- Country of origin: United States
- Original language: Spanish
- No. of episodes: 206

Production
- Executive producer: Carlos Lamus
- Producers: Mariana Iskandariani; Diana Ariza
- Cinematography: Reinaldo Figueira; Miguel Font
- Editor: Ramiro Pardo
- Camera setup: Multi-camera
- Production company: Telemundo Studios

Original release
- Network: Telemundo
- Release: March 6, 2012 – January 7, 2013

Corazón Valiente (Fearless Heart), originally known as Caídas del Cielo (Falls of Heaven), is a Spanish-language telenovela produced by U.S.-based television network Telemundo Studios, Miami, featuring an ensemble cast. Adriana Fonseca, Ximena Duque, José Luis Reséndez and Fabián Ríos starred as the main protagonists, with Aylin Mujica and Manuel Landeta starred as the main antagonists.

Telemundo aired Corazón Valiente weeknights at 9 pm/8c from March 6, 2012 to January 7, 2013, replacing Flor Salvaje. On January 8, 2013, La Patrona replaced Corazón Valiente. As with most of its other telenovelas, the network broadcast English subtitles as closed captions on CC3.

== Plot ==
Corazón valiente is the story of the friendship between two girls in a remote Mexican city called Valle de Bravo. Ángela Valdez (Sofía Sanabria), humble and sweet, was the daughter of Miguel Valdéz (Jorge Luis Pila), the bodyguard of the powerful and wealthy family Sandoval Navarro. Samantha Sandoval Navarro was the rich girl guarded by Miguel Valdéz. The two girls' lives are forever changed when Samantha is kidnapped, resulting in Miguel Valdéz sacrificing his life to save her. After what happened, the girls were separated.

Ángela and Samantha meet again after eighteen years. Ángela (Adriana Fonseca) is married to Luis Martínez (Gabriel Valenzuela); Has a daughter, Violeta (Nicole Arci), and works as a baker. For her part, Samantha (Ximena Duque) works as a bodyguard. Samantha comes up with the idea of inviting Ángela to work with her; Ángela accepts and assigns her the mission to protect Génesis Arroyo, the daughter of a multimillionaire lawyer named Juan Marcos Arroyo (Jose Luis Reséndez) who is unfortunately married to Isabel Uriarte (Sonya Smith), a proud and evil woman who is unfaithful, even with his own bodyguard. Meanwhile, Samantha is ordered to protect Willy del Castillo (Fabián Ríos), her first love, who has become a whimsical playboy and womanizer. Samantha decides not to reveal anything of her past, but he ends up discovering who she is and love arises between them.

The series follows Ángela and Samantha as they face opposition from their antagonists while pursuing relationships with the people they love.

== Cast ==
=== Main ===
- Adriana Fonseca as Ángela Valdez (Female Protagonist)
- José Luis Reséndez as Juan Marcos Arroyo (Male Protagonist)
- Aylín Mújica as Fernanda del Castillo / Victoria Villafañe (Female antagonist)
- Ximena Duque as Samantha Sandoval Navarro / Samantha Valdéz Navarro (Co-Female Protagonist)
- Fabián Ríos as Guillermo "Willy" del Castillo (Co-Male Protagonist)
- Vanessa Pose as Emma Arroyo
- Jon-Michael Ecker as Pablo Peralta
- Jorge Luis Pila as Miguel Valdéz
- Manuel Landeta as Bernardo del Castillo (Antagonist)
- Katie Barberi as Perla Navarro
- Leonardo Daniel as Darío Sandoval
- Gilda Haddock as Estela de Valdéz (Antagonist)
- Gabriel Valenzuela as Luis Martínez (Antagonist)/ Camilo Martínez (Protagonist)
- José Guillermo Cortines as Renzo Mancilla
- Tatiana Capote as Ofelia Ramírez
- Alejandro López as Vicente La Madrid (Antagonist)
- Lino Martone as Diego Villareal
- Roberto Plantier as Gabriel La Madrid
- Priscila Perales as Nelly Balbuena
- Ahrid Hannaley as Cecilia
- Briggitte Bozzo as Génesis Arroyo
- Nicole Arci as Violeta Martínez
- Carolina Tejera as Lorena Barrios
- Gabriel Porras as Miguel Valdez Gutiérrez
- Brenda Asnicar as Fabiola Arroyo / Fabiola Ferrara
- Angeline Moncayo as Laura Aguilar
- Alba Roversi as Nora / La Madrina
- Daniela Navarro as Clara Salvatierra
- Pablo Azar as Gustavo Ponte
- Gregorio Pernia as Javier del Toro / El Verdugo / Javier Falcón
- Miguel Varoni as Jesús Matamoros / El Mesiás

=== Recurring ===
- Sandra Beltrán as Ivonne Matamoros / La Niña Bonita (Antagonist)
- Andrés Cotrino as Nicolás del Castillo
- Gabriela Borges as Jessica Águilar del Toro
- Jonathan Freudman as Rodrigo Sandoval
- Eduardo Rodríguez as Esteban de la Vega
- Sonya Smith as Isabel Uriarte De Arroyo
- Emily Alvarado as Young Samantha Sandoval
- Ileana Jacket as Josefina Uriarte
- Michelle Jones as Pamela Vallester
- Paloma Márquez as Sol Díaz de León
- Mauro Menendez as Young Jesús Matamoros
- Ezequiel Montalt as Teniente Manuel Flores
- Dayami Padrón as Paloma Nieves
- Juan Jiménez as Cayetano Rodríguez / Ringo (Antagonist)
- Francisco Porras as Dante
- María del Pilar Pérez as María Fernanda del Castillo
- Yami Quintero as Fiscal Eugenia de la Salle
- Fernando Cermeño as Gael
- Anthony Sandobal as Juan Cruz Arroyo
- Jamie Sasson as Paula Uriarte
- Eduardo Wasveiler as Juan Ignacio Arroyo
- Zainab Alzaba

=== Guest ===
Sonya Smith as Isabel Uriarte De Arroyo

== Awards and nominations ==
Year	Award	Category	Nominated	Result
2012	Premios People en Español			
2012	Premios People en Español	Best Telenovela	Marcela Citterio	Nominated
2012	Premios People en Español	Best Actress	Adriana Fonseca	Nominated
2012	Premios People en Español	Best Actor	José Luis Reséndez	Nominated
2012	Premios People en Español	Best Supporting Actress	Ximena Duque	Nominated
2012	Premios People en Español	Best Supporting Actor	Fabián Ríos	Nominated
2012	Premios People en Español	Best Villain	Manuel Landeta	Nominated
2012	Premios People en Español	Best Villain	Aylín Mujica	Nominated
2012	Premios People en Español	Newcomer of the Year	Briggitte Bozzo	Nominated
2012	Premios People en Español	Sweethearts	Ximena Duque and Fabián Ríos	Nominated
2012	Premios Tu Mundo			
2012	Premios Tu Mundo	Novela of the Year	Marcela Citterio	Nominated
2012	Premios Tu Mundo	Favorite Lead Actor	José Luis Reséndez	Nominated
2012	Premios Tu Mundo	Favorite Lead Actress	Adriana Fonseca	Nominated
2012	Premios Tu Mundo	The Best Bad Boy	Manuel Landeta	Nominated
2012	Premios Tu Mundo	The Best Bad Girl	Aylin Mujica	Won
2012	Premios Tu Mundo	The Perfect Couple	Ximena Duque and Fabián Ríos	Won
2012	Premios Tu Mundo	The Best Kiss	Ximena Duque and Fabián Ríos	Won
2012	Premios Tu Mundo	Great Young Actor	Briggitte Bozzo	Nominated
2012	Premios Tu Mundo	Great Young Actor	Emily Alvarado	Nominated
2012	Premios Tu Mundo	Great Young Actor	Nicole Arci	Nominated
2012	Premios Tu Mundo	Best Bad Luck Video	"El plan de seducción de Vicente sale mal"	Nominated
2012	Premios Tu Mundo	Best Bad Luck Video	"Ángela confunde al dueño de la casa con el empleado"	Nominated
2012	Premios Tu Mundo	Best Novela Soundtrack	"Mi primer amor"	Nominated
2013	Miami Life Awards			
2013	Miami Life Awards	Best Telenovela	Marcela Citterio	Nominated
2013	Miami Life Awards	Best female lead of telenovela	Adriana Fonseca	Won
2013	Miami Life Awards	Best female lead of telenovela	Ximena Duque	Nominated
2013	Miami Life Awards	Best male lead of telenovela	José Luis Reséndez	Nominated
2013	Miami Life Awards	Best male lead of telenovela	Fabián Ríos	Nominated
2013	Miami Life Awards	Best Supporting Actress telenovela	Brenda Asnicar	Nominated
2013	Miami Life Awards	Best actress telenovela villain	Aylín Mujica	Won
2013	Miami Life Awards	Best actor telenovela villain	Manuel Landeta	Nominated
2013	Miami Life Awards	Best actor telenovela villain	Gabriel Valenzuela	Won
2013	Miami Life Awards	Best leading actress	Alba Roversi	Nominated
2013	Miami Life Awards	Best Actress disclosure	Briggitte Bozzo	Nominated
2013	Miami Life Awards	Best Actress disclosure	Emily Alvarado	Nominated
2013	Miami Life Awards	Best Actress disclosure	Nicole Arci	Nominated
2013	Miami Life Awards	Best Actress disclosure	Sofía Sanabria	Nominated
2013	Miami Life Awards	Best telenovela	Marcela Citterio	Won
2014	Miami Life Awards			
2014	Miami Life Awards	Best young actress telenovela	Sofía Sanabria	Nominated
