= Ricardo Chávez =

Mexican actor

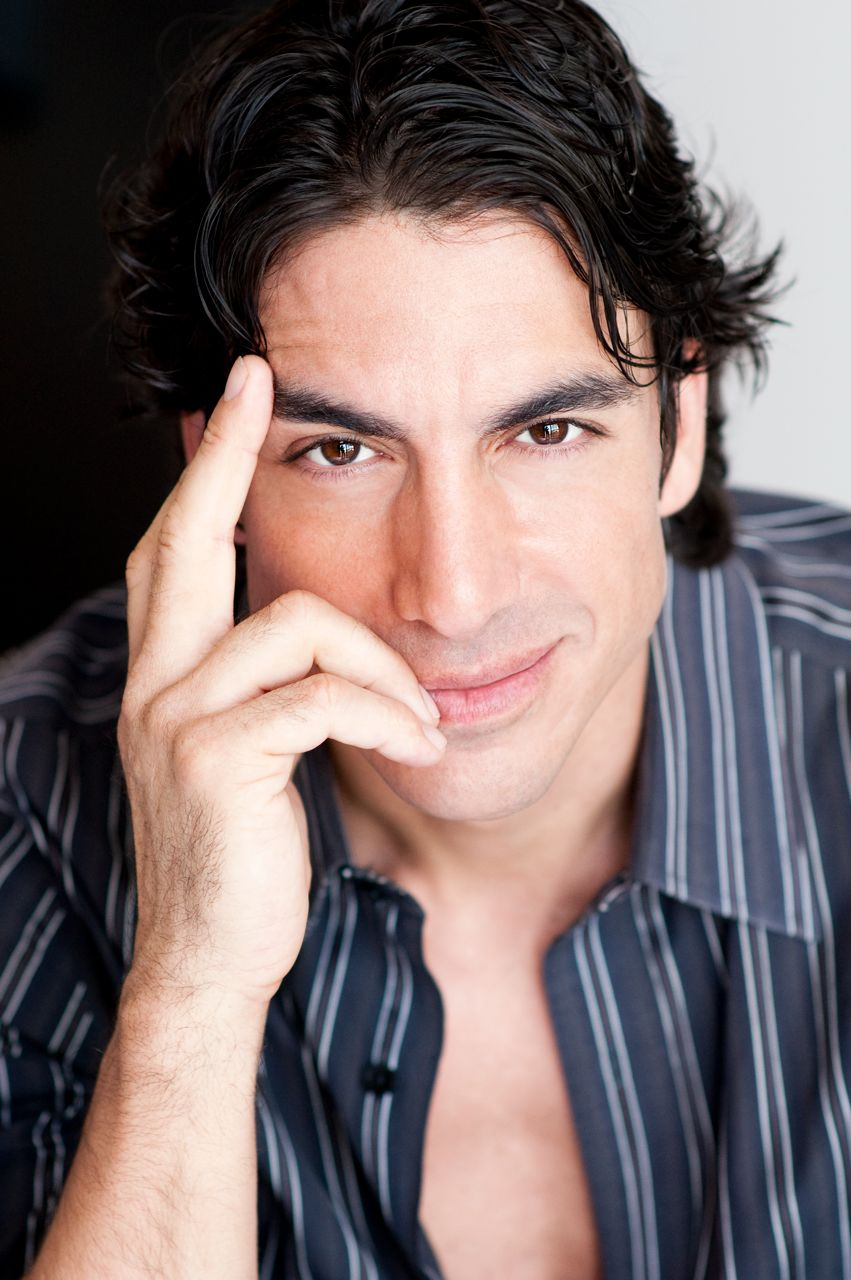
- Born: Ricardo Chavez; November 24, 1965 (age 60); Mexico City, Mexico
- Occupation: Actor/ author
- Years active: 1987–present
- Website: www.ricardochavez.com

Ricardo Chávez (born November 24, 1965) is a Mexican actor who has worked in theater, television and film. He was also a model and a ballet dancer before acting.

== Early life and background ==
Ricardo Chávez was born in Mexico City on November 24, 1965, to a middle-class family. He is the youngest of three brothers. His father is an engineer and his mother is a housewife, and were both in the entertainment business before getting married. His father sang Mexican music and opened concerts for Pedro Infante and his mother worked as a model.

At the age of 16 when he was studying bachelor's to become a Classical Dance Performer at the Instituto Nacional de Bellas Artes of Mexico, Ricardo started working in theater.

== Career ==
He then moved back to acting and started appearing in popular soap operas in Mexico, on the Hispanic network Televisa. After starring in nine soap operas on that network, Chávez moved to Brazil and played a lead role in the soap opera Vale Todo on Globo Network. Later, he went to Miami to play the lead role in the series On The Edge of the Law. Following this he played the lead role in the film Pretty Boy for which he won an award in "The Made in Miami Film Festival".

Ricardo Chávez has acted in 21 different plays including Who Is the Guilty One?, Andrés, Here Comes the Train, How To Forget My Past, Waiting for Godot, The Fiddler on the Roof with Manolo Fábregas among others.

== Book ==
After 18 soap operas, 21 theater plays, 8 movies and over 100 television shows and series, Ricardo wrote Your Life Does Not Have To Be A Soap Opera, which was published simultaneously in English and Spanish in several continents.

== Filmography ==
=== Movies ===
Year	Film	Role
1985	Gavilán o paloma	Supporting
1986	Solamente una vez ((Agustin Lara’s life))	Sergio
1988	Blood And Fire	Terrorist
1988	Der Radfahrer Von San Cristóbal	Dito Vargas
1997	In A Horse's Shoes	Charro
2003	The Brazilian Girl and the Dummy Cuban	Alberto
2005	Pretty Boy	Gabriel
2005	Se Habla Español	Juan Domingo Garcia
2009	Cabeza de Buda	Lino

=== Television ===
Year	Film	Role	Network
1985	King Lear	King of France	Channel 11
1985	Paths to Glory	Revolutionary	Televisa
1986	The Spider Web	Different Characters	
1987	Agustín Lara’s Life	Waiter	Televisa
1999	Christmas Tale	Poet	
1999	PorTu Amor	Theater Actor	
1999	Betrayed Women	Boss	Televisa
1999	Three Women	Rogelio	Televisa
1999-2001	Woman, Cases of Real Life	Different Characters	
2000	First Love at 1000 X Hour	Sebastián Olivares	Televisa
2000	Embrace Me Tightly	Motor	Televisa
2001	Aventuras en el tiempo	Octavio	Televisa
2002	Everything Goes	Felipe	Globo
2002	¡Vivan los niños!	Uriel	
2004	Prisionera	Santiago Mesa	Telemundo
2005	Women's Decisions	Benjamin	
2006	South Beach	Casper Diaz	Paramount Television
2005-2007	Decisiones	Benjamin / Ernesto / Horacio	Telemundo
2006	Tierra de pasiones	Miguel Valdez	Telemundo
2006	Lottery!	Julian	
2007	Dame Chocolate	Diosdado Amado	Telemundo
2008	El juramento	Justo Romero	Telemundo
2013	Marido En Alquiler	Gabriel Rodríguez	Telemundo
2014	Villa paraíso	Ricardo Castillejo	Telemundo
2014	Tierra de Reyes	Ignacio Del Junco	Telemundo
2020	100 días para enamorarnos	Héctor Morillo	Telemundo

=== Theater ===
Year	Play	Role	Place
1985	Zoo	Jerry	I.S.S.T.E. Theatre, Mexico City
1986	Waiting for Godot	Vladimiro/Estragon	I.S.S.T.E. Theatre, Mexico
1986	The Visit of the Beast	Raul	El Hijo Del Cuervo Stage, Mexico City
1986	How to Forget My Past	Gerard	Hidalgo Theater, Mexico City
1987	Tito, the Little Elephant	Tijo the lizard	Ecatepec Forum, Mexico
1988	The Loneliness Well	Gorgeous	Teatro Fru Fru, Mexico City
1989	Hughie	Erie Smith	El Hijo Del Cuervo Stage, Mexico City
1989	Meeting Hours	Robbie	Silvia Pinal Theatre, Mexico City
1989	The Fiddler on the Roof	Chorus	Teatro Hidalgo, Mexico City
2000	Andres, There Comes the Train	Old Repudios	The Actors’ Home, Mexico City
2003	Who is The One Guilty?	Tony	Casa Panza, Miami
