= Telemundo Studios =

Spanish-language American television production studio

- Formerly: Telemundo RTI Studios (2006); Telemundo Global Studios (2018–2024)
- Parent: NBCUniversal Telemundo Enterprises
- Divisions: Telemundo International Studios; Telemundo Streaming Studios
- Subsidiaries: Underground Producciones

Telemundo Studios (formerly known as Telemundo Television Studios and Telemundo Global Studios) is an American television production division of Hispanic entertainment production unit NBCUniversal Telemundo Enterprises, which is part of mass media and entertainment conglomerate NBCUniversal, that develops original in-house Spanish-language programming for NBCUniversal's television network Telemundo.

== History ==
Telemundo Studios Miami was launched as Telemundo-RTI Studios, a joint venture of American Spanish-language television network Telemundo and Colombian television production company RTI Producciones. However, in late October 2006, Telemundo Communications Group announced the complete acquisition of the remaining 50% from R.T.I. Producciones, renaming the studio as Telemundo Studios Miami. Additionally, Tepuy International was acquired and repositioned as Telemundo's international distribution divisions, being rebranded as Telemundo International. Former Telemundo-RTI president and head of Telemundo's in-house production Patricio Wills stepped down from the rebranded Miami-division and became president in charge of Telemundo Television Studios. CEO Marcos Santana became the president of Telemundo International.

In October 2016, Telemundo Studios' parent company NBCUniversal Telemundo Enterprises announced the creation of their international production division dedicated to Spanish language content for international markets, named Telemundo International Studios, with Marcos Santana as president of the division.

In January 2018, Telemundo Global Studios' parent company NBCUniversal Telemundo Enterprises announced the creation of Telemundo Global Studios, which consolidated the company's domestic unit Telemundo Studios and international scripted production unit Telemundo International Studios, under Marco Santana's leadership.

In August 2019, NBCUniversal Telemundo Enterprises announced they had acquired Argentine television production company Underground Producciones, marking Telemundo Global Studios' expansion into the Argentinian television production market. Underground's founder Sebastián Ortega continued leading the acquired company and joined Telemundo Global Studios' development creative team.

In May 2021, NBCUniversal Telemundo Enterprises entered the streaming television production genre by announcing the establishment of Telemundo Streaming Studios, a division based in Miami dedicated to premium scripted Spanish-language production for streaming services, with Marcos Santana leading the new division as its president.

In June 2022, NBCUniversal Telemundo Enterprises expanded their production output into Mexico with the establishment of their Mexico City-based production studio named Telemundo Global Studios Mexico (now Telemundo Studios Mexico), marking Telemundo Global Studios' second production studio division in Mexico and increasing their production capacities.

In April 2024, NBCUniversal Telemundo Enterprises' chairman Luis Fernandez restructured Telemundo's scripted content productions under the Telemundo Studios brand.

== See also ==
- List of United States television networks
