= List of awards and nominations received by Danna Paola =

Danna Paola awards and nominations
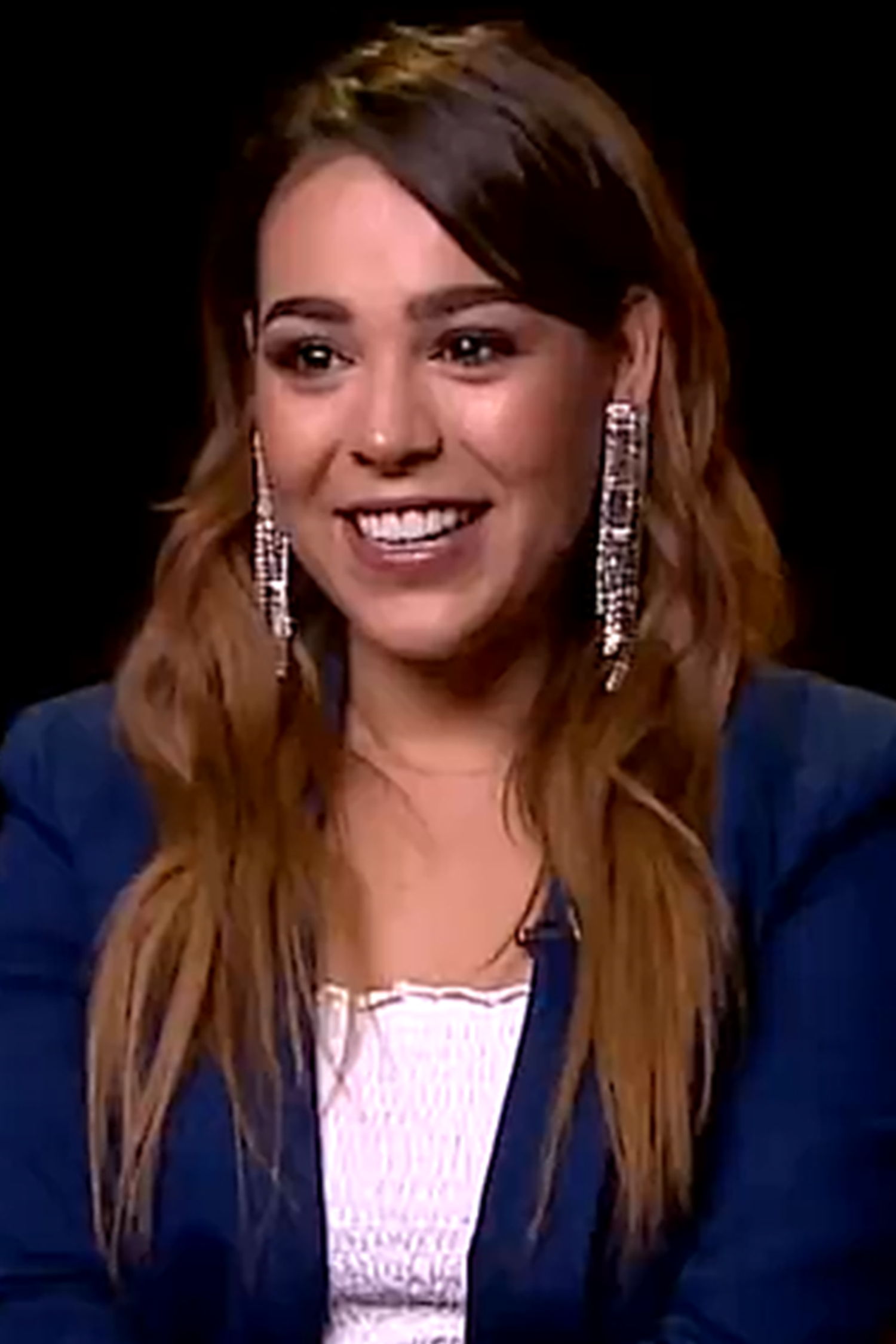
- Danna during an interview in September 2018
Awards and nominations
Award	Wins	Nominations
MTV Europe	1	3
Universal Awards	1	1
MTV Italy Awards	4	4
MTV Millennial Awards	2	3
Kids Choice Awards	0	3
Kids Choice Awards Mexico	7	9
Latin Music Italian Awards	15	15
Premios Bravo	3	3
Premios Juventud	0	1
Premios Oye	2	2
Premios TVyNovelas	4	5
Yahoo! Awards	1	1
YouTube Music Awards	6	10
ACPT Awards	2	2
Aplauso Basta	1	1
Barbie Awards	2	2
Fans' Choice Awards	2	3
Fashion Police	1	1
Hector Azar's Internacional Theater Festival	1	1
El Heraldo de México Awards	1	1
Lunas del Auditorio	1	4

Totals (Note: Certain award groups do not simply award one winner. They acknowledge several different recipients, have runners-up, and have third place. Since this is a specific recognition and is different from losing an award, runner-up mentions are considered wins in this award tally. For simplification and to avoid errors, each award in this list has been presumed to have had a prior nomination.)
- Wins: 87
- Nominations: 122

Danna Paola, Mexican singer and actress, has won 87 awards out of 122 nominations.

== Kids Choice Awards ==
=== Nickelodeon Kids' Choice Awards ===
Year	Nominee / work	Award	Result	Lost to	Ref.
2012	Herself	Favorite Latin Artist	Nominated	Isabella Castillo	
2013	Herself	Favorite Latin Artist	Nominated	Isabella Castillo	
2014	Herself	Favorite Latin Artist	Nominated	Lali Espósito	

=== Nickelodeon Mexico Kids' Choice Awards ===
Year	Nominee / work	Award	Result	Ref.
2010	Herself	Promisse Award	Won	
2010	Herself	Favorite Actress	Won	
2012	Herself	Favorite Latin Artist	Won	
2013	Herself	Favorite Twittstar	Won	
2014	Herself	Favorite Fashionista	Won	
2015	Herself	Favorite Beauty	Won	
2015	"Mía"	Favorite Pet	Won	
2016	Herself	Favorite Actress	Won	
2016	"Mientras Me Enamoras (feat. Lalo Brito)"	Favorite Song	Nominated	
2016	¿Quien Es Quien?	Favorite Series	Won	
2016	Herself	Trendy Girl	Nominated	

== Shorty Awards ==
Year	Nominee / work	Award	Result	Lost to	Ref.
2015	Herself	Best Singer	Nominated	Taylor Swift	
2015	Herself	Best Actress	Nominated	Bella Thorne	
2015	Herself	Best Activist	Nominated	Katie Meyler	
2015	Herself	Best Celebrity	Nominated	Conan O'Brien	
2015	Herself	Best Fashion	Won		
2015	Herself	Best Instagrammer	Won		

== MTV Awards ==
=== MTV Europe Music Awards ===
Year	Nominee / work	Award	Result	Ref.
2012	Herself	Best North Latin American Artist	Nominated	
2013	Herself	Best North Latin American Artist	Nominated	
2020	Herself	Best North Latin American Artist	Won	

=== MTV Italy Awards ===
Year	Nominee / work	Award	Result	Ref.
2012	Herself	Best New Artist	Won	
2013	Herself	Best Female Artist from Latin America	Won	
2013	"Agüita"	Best Video	Won	
2014	Herself	Vogue Eyewear Best Look	Won	

=== MTV Millennial Awards ===
Year	Nominee / work	Award	Result	Ref.
2013	Herself	Cake of the Year	Nominated	
2014	"Agüita"	Latin Video of the Year	Won	
2015	Herself	Mexican Instagrammer of the Year	Won	
2021	Herself	Miaw Artist	Nominated	
2021	Herself	Mexican Artist	Nominated	

== YouTube Music Awards ==
Year	Nominee / work	Award	Result	Lost to	Ref.
2011	Herself	Best Latina	Nominated	Thalía	
2012	Herself	Best Latina on YouTube	Nominated	Alejandra Guzmán	
2012	"Ruleta"	Best New Latin Pop	Won		
2013	"No Es Cierto" (feat. Noel Schajris)	Best Latin Music Video	Won		
2013	"No Es Cierto" (feat. Noel Schajris)	Best Music Video	Nominated	"Wrecking Ball" by Miley Cyrus	
2013	Herself	Most Viewed Latina	Won		
2013	Herself	Upcoming on YouTube	Nominated	Iggy Azalea	
2013	"Agüita"	Favorite Latin Music Video	Won		
2014	Herself	Best Latina	Won		
2014	Herself	New Pop International Upcoming Artist	Won		

== Universal Awards ==
Year	Nominee / work	Award	Result	Ref.
2014	Herself	Most Beautiful Mexican Teen	Won	

== Premios Oye! ==
Year	Nominee / work	Award	Result	Ref.
2009	"Mundo de Caramelo"	Best Novel, Movie or TV Series Theme	Won	
2010	"Yo soy tu amigo fiel"	Best Novel, Movie or TV Series Theme	Won	

== Premios Juventud ==
Year	Nominee / work	Award	Result	Lost to	Ref.
2011	Herself	Girl Who Keeps Me Up at Night	Nominated	Maite Perroni	
2022	Herself	Popular Artist or Influencer	Nominated	Karol G	
2022	Herself	Trendiest Artist	Nominated	Karol G	
2022	Elite	My Favorite Actress	Won		

== Latin Grammy Awards ==
Year	Nominee / work	Award	Result	Ref.
2021	K.O.	Best Pop Vocal Album	Nominated	

== Lunas del Auditorio ==
Year	Nominee / work	Award	Result	Ref.
2009	Atrevete a Soñar	Family Show	Nominated	
2014	"Elphaba" in Wicked	Broadway Show	Won	
2015	"María" in Hoy no me puedo levantar	Broadway Show	Nominated	
2015	"Elphaba" in Wicked	Broadway Show	Nominated	

== Premios TVyNovelas ==
Year	Nominee / work	Award	Result	Ref.
2006	Pablo y Andrea	Best Child Actress	Won	
2008	Muchachitas como tú	Best Child Actress	Won	
2009	Querida enemiga	Best Teen Actress	Won	
2010	Atrévete A Soñar	Best Musical Theme	Won	
2010	Atrévete A Soñar	Best Teen Actress	Won	

== E! Entertainment Television Awards ==
=== Fashion Police ===
Year	Nominee / work	Award	Result	Ref.
2014	Herself	Best Dressed of the Year	Won	

== Yahoo! Awards ==
Year	Nominee / work	Award	Result	Ref.
2011	Herself	The OMG! Star of the Year	Won	

== Terra Awards ==
Year	Nominee / work	Award	Result	Ref.
2013	"No Es Cierto" (feat. Noel Schajris)	Best Song of the Year	Won	
2013	"Agüita"	Best Video of the Year	Won	

== El Heraldo de México Awards ==
Year	Nominee / work	Award	Result	Ref.
2002	María Belén	Female Revelation	Won	

== Premios Bravo ==
Year	Nominee / work	Award	Result	Ref.
2002	María Belén	Best Child Actress	Won	
2005	Amy, la niña de la mochila azul	Best Child Actress	Won	
2006	Anita la huerfanita	Best Child Theater Actress	Won	

== ACPT Awards ==
Year	Nominee / work	Award	Result	Ref.
2005	Anita la huerfanita	Best Child Actress	Won	
2014	"Elphaba" in Wicked	Revelation Actress at Internacional Musical	Won	

== Festival Internacional de Teatro Héctor Azar ==
Year	Nominee / work	Award	Result	Ref.
2013	"Elphaba" in Wicked	Female Revelation	Won	

== Aplauso Basta (Editorial Basta) ==
Year	Nominee / work	Award	Result	Ref.
2014	"Elphaba" in Wicked	International Musical's Revelation	Won	

== Your World Awards ==
Year	Nominee / work	Award	Result	Ref.
2016	¿Quién es quién?	Favorite Lead Actress	Won	
2016	Herself and Eugenio Siller	The Perfect Couple	Won	
2017	La Doña	Favorite Actress	Nominated	
