= La querida del Centauro season 2 =

La querida del Centauro
- Season 2
- La querida del Centauro season 2 poster
- Starring: Humberto Zurita; Ludwika Paleta; Michel Brown; Sandra Echeverría
- No. of episodes: 90

Release
- Original network: Telemundo
- Original release: May 2 – July 24, 2017

The second and final season of La querida del Centauro, an American drama, was written by Lina Uribe and Darío Vanegas and developed by Telemundo. It premiered on May 2, 2017 and ended on July 24, 2017. The new season revolves around the revenge that will carry out El Centauro (Humberto Zurita). Prisoner of an obsession that knows no limits, the capo deploys all its evil to punish his old lover, Yolanda (Ludwika Paleta), and Gerardo (Michel Brown), the detective who tried to bring him to justice.

This second season does not have the participation of Irene Azuela and Alexandra de la Mora. Returning cast members from previous seasons include: Humberto Zurita, Ludwika Paleta and Michel Brown. New additions to the cast are Sandra Echeverría.

== Plot ==
The second season tells the story of the Centauro revenge against Yolanda, his former lover and Gerardo, the detective who sought to bring him to justice. After running away from the authorities for two years, tired of being constantly harassed by the police and the bloody war between his cartel and his rivals, Centauro will fake his death and that of his son. In this way he will be able to rebuild his empire without the persecution of the police and, moreover, will allow him to execute his plan of revenge. Listening to the news of the alleged deaths, Yolanda and her daughter Cristina, as well as Gerardo and his adopted son, Gato, manage to return to Mexico from Canada, where they have lived under the Witness Protection Program. However, it will not be an easy return for Yolanda, since Centaurus will use all his sagacity and power to destroy her and her loved ones in their thirst for revenge.

== Cast ==
=== Starring ===
- Humberto Zurita as Benedictino Suárez / El Centauro
- Ludwika Paleta as Yolanda Acosta
- Michel Brown as Gerardo Duarte
- Sandra Echeverría as Ana Velazco

=== Also starring ===
- Ricardo Polanco as Rafael Bianchini
- Mónica Dionne as Leticia Solís
- Michel Chauvet as Emilio Cobos
- Arantza Ruiz as Cristina Acosta
- Pablo Abitia as Vicente Garrido
- Salvador Amaya as Isidro Gómez
- Horacio García Rojas as Eduardo Lalo López
- Tizoc Arroyo as Javier Antuna
- Alejandro Caso as Julián Lemus
- Óscar Toledano as Nicolás Bayón
- Jaime del Aguila as Luis "Lucho" Rodríguez
- Iñaki Godoy as Amadeo / El Gato
- Raúl Villegas as Miguel Fernández
- José Ramón Berganza as Román Luna

=== Recurring ===
- Albi De Abreu as El Loco
- Quetzalli Bulnes as Adriana Bianchini
- Mariannela Cataño as Paula Bianchini
- Diego Cornejo as Tyson

== Episodes ==
No. overall	No. in season	Title	Original release date	US viewers (millions)
52	1	"Yolanda cae en la trampa"	May 2, 2017	1.14
El Centauro and Emilio are cornered by the police. Benedicto shows that he carries a strapped bomb. Gerardo and Yolanda return from Canada without knowing that El Centauro watches their movements. Yolanda, who suffers from post-traumatic stress. Believes that Cristina was kidnapped and ends up in a taxi driven by a Centauro thug, after leaving the witness protection program.
53	2	"Mensaje de amenaza"	May 3, 2017	1.01
Yolanda escapes the explosion and asks for help. He receives a message from El Centauro and is sure that he lives. El Centauro orders the second threat. A psychiatrist is recommended for Yolanda.
54	3	"Revelación"	May 4, 2017	0.93
Ana finds out that El Centauro and Emilio are alive. He goes "where he died" El Centauro and sees Yolanda, who tries to talk to her, but escapes. They come to an isolated cabin. Ana prepares her weapon.
55	4	"De incógnito"	May 5, 2017	0.87
Mariana is insinuated to Gerardo. El Centauro traps the Cholo and erases his memory, convinces him that he always worked for him. Yolanda climbs an elevator and finds El Centauro in disguise.
56	5	"La ficha de El Centauro"	May 8, 2017	0.85
Yolanda arrives at the place of the attack against El Gato, warned by El Centauro. There is an explosion and she panics; Is hospitalized. Emilio faces the Centaur. Mariana, has two faces.
57	6	"Tercera advertencia"	May 8, 2017	1.01
Yolanda has another appointment with Dr. Lemus, who will take her to the Institute of Forensic Sciences to see the corpse of El Centauro: it is the third warning. Benedicto and Mariana make love.
58	7	"El Centauro mueve sus hilos"	May 9, 2017	0.83
The police find Yolanda's belongings, they think she committed suicide. El Centauro reveals to Yolanda that Mariana and Lemus are his accomplices; She will end up killing them all.
59	8	"¿Suicidio?"	May 9, 2017	0.87
Gerardo does not believe that Yolanda committed suicide. El Centauro reproaches Yolanda for her betrayal, even though she is unconscious. Ana wants to reveal the truth about the Centaur to Gerardo.
60	9	"Juego de amnesia"	May 10, 2017	0.81
El Centauro makes Yolanda believe that she is his beloved. He filters information about a new leader by running his organization. Gerardo investigates Ana, and she seems captivated by him.
61	10	"Espía al descubierto"	May 10, 2017	0.93
Before El Centauro arrives, his men discover that Lucho brings a microphone and everything is out of control. They arrest Isidro and Gerardo notices the tattoo Yolanda described to him. Suspend Gerardo.
62	11	"Siembra la duda"	May 11, 2017	0.77
Gerardo catches and interrogates Ana. She tells him that El Centauro lives and that Mariana is involved. The Centaur continues with Yolanda's experiment, although she is concerned about the harmful effects.
63	12	"Espionaje en marcha"	May 11, 2017	0.85
Gerardo hears Ana's messages and believes her brother. She puts a device on Mariana's cell phone to spy on her. Yolanda awakens strangely normal. Román has plans with Cristina.
64	13	"¿Yolanda al mando?"	May 12, 2017	0.58
Gerardo reviews the videos where Yolanda appears dead and notes that they were erased. El Centauro thinks of Yolanda as the new boss. Mariana steals information from Rafael and gives it to El Centauro.
65	14	"Jefa de Cártel"	May 12, 2017	0.77
Mariana orders to kill Gerardo by puncturing her cell phone. Yolanda, masked, meets with the Jackals and executes a traitor. Lemus quotes Gerardo, injects him and leaves him unconscious.
66	15	"¡Fuera del Camino!"	May 15, 2017	0.87
Julián internal to Gerardo by an "attack of wrath". Yolanda kills four of the traitors. She sees photos of her family and The Centaur orders her to kill them and she accepts. Vicente fears for his life.
67	16	"Yolanda se revela"	May 15, 2017	0.95
Ana and Vicente try to get Gerardo out. Yolanda finds out in the hold about the business. El Centauro asks him to return and she does not obey his orders. Emilio leaves her, under certain conditions.
68	17	"Armada hasta los dientes"	May 16, 2017	0.96
Yolanda, armed to the teeth, looks for Ana and Miguel. El Centauro proposes to Yolanda. Mariana threatens him; He puts it in its place. El Gato hides Gerardo's cell phone.
69	18	"Operación rescate"	May 16, 2017	1.06
Yolanda agrees to marry El Centauro. Samuel prepares the lethal injection to kill Gerardo. Ana and Vicente go to the rescue. Mariana says goodbye to her lover. Cristina, in the wrong hands.
70	19	"El Centauro en Jaque"	May 17, 2017	0.93
Ana and Gerardo find Mariana, they struggle and a gun is fired. El Centauro calls Mariana and Gerardo answers; He tells him that he is going for him. Vicente, Gato and Cristina run away, not knowing that they follow.
71	20	"Doloroso destino"	May 17, 2017	1.02
Rafael suffers with the death of Mariana. Nicolás hesitates to tell everything that happened. Yolanda asks for help to find out about her past. El Gato, Cristina, and Vicente realize that they are chasing them.
72	21	"Rompecabezas"	May 18, 2017	0.95
Ana and Gerardo see Vicente's body. The tension between them goes up. The death of Mariana incriminates Duarte. Nicolás hides the truth and investigates Mariana. Emilio and Julián are allies.
73	22	"Chip para Yolanda"	May 18, 2017	0.95
Lemus plans to implant a chip to Yolanda so that Emilio traces it, hidden from El Centauro. Nicolás reports what happened at different points. Lucho finds clues in favor of Duarte.
74	23	"Coqueteos"	May 19, 2017	0.79
They implant the chip to Yolanda; She insists on her past. Gerardo saves Ana from an uncomfortable moment. Nicolás continues his investigation, not knowing that they are being watched. Julián and Emilio flirt.
75	24	"Yolanda y su sexto sentido"	May 19, 2017	0.83
Yolanda senses that they are hiding something and plans to go to the port. Gerardo looks for his children and is worried to see a flyer with the photo of Ana. He, Ana and Miguel steal another car to pay Tyson.
76	25	"Confabulación"	May 22, 2017	0.90
Yolanda is more doubtful of her past. Nicolás and Alex see the matron who used Mariana and warn that there is a plot. The police think they want to avenge the death of El Centauro.
77	26	"Investigaciones peligrosas"	May 22, 2017	0.93
Yolanda and her 'aunt' talk about her past. Ana and Gerardo find a video where Carrillo is tortured. The Centaur, knowing that Alex and Nicolás have a lot of information, orders them to be eliminated.
78	27	"Leticia horrorizada"	May 23, 2017	0.81
Gerardo, Ana, and Miguel are looking for information about Los Chacales. The shooting is set. Alex finds his apartment destroyed and fears for his life. El Cholo kidnaps Leticia. Julián injects her.
79	28	"Mala memoria"	May 23, 2017	0.94
Yolanda has fuzzy memories of Gerardo and she is very confused. Gerardo and Ana interrogate the Mapache and discover that a woman leads Los Chacales. El Centauro orders to kidnap Alex.
80	29	"Balacera en la red"	May 24, 2017	0.83
The video of the shootings comes to light. Abel wants to do business with Gerardo, Ana, and Miguel. The police look for Leticia; Yolanda proposes that she surrender and divert the investigation.
81	30	"El Centauro acorrala a Nicolás"	May 24, 2017	0.91
El "Ángel" sends a message. Yolanda trains Leticia with her testimony for the police. El Centauro puts Nicholas between the sword and the wall. Lucho betrays Rafael by helping the children.
82	31	"Borrar rastros"	May 25, 2017	0.89
They force Nicolás to clean up the scene of the crime. Abel and Gerardo allied to face Los Chacales. I fight and the children decipher the hidden message of the "Ángel". Yolanda has a regression.
83	32	"Pista certera"	May 25, 2017	0.92
Yolanda collapses and Centauro, frightened, asks Julián for solutions. She sees the video of "Ángel" and brings her new memories. I fight and the children seek to reunite with Gerardo and Ana.
84	33	"Nicolás conoce a su verdugo"	May 26, 2017	0.85
Yolanda has a dream of the wedding with Gerardo. Leticia hesitates to tell Yolanda about her previous life. Gerardo accepts Abel's treatment. Wedding bells. Nicolás knows El Centauro.
85	34	"¿Unidos para siempre?"	May 26, 2017	0.94
Gerardo and Ana are carried away by the attraction, they kiss. They plan to gain ground for a Los Chacales drug dealer. They celebrate the wedding of Yolanda and El Centauro. Leticia decides to tell Yolanda something.
86	35	"Esposo plantado"	May 29, 2017	0.97
Yolanda, confused, escapes with the weapon that El Centauro gave her. Ana and Gerardo make love. Leticia listens to unpleasant plans. El Centauro seeks Yolanda. Emilio traces it secretly.
87	36	"El plan de Emilio"	May 29, 2017	0.91
Emilio exposes Julián his plan to kill Yolanda. She does not remember anything about the wedding. Cristina gets a pregnancy test. You will have an MRI of Yolanda.
88	37	"Lemus bajo la lupa"	May 30, 2017	0.96
Yolanda hesitates to learn that Julián is a psychiatrist. Javier reveals to Rafael his finding about Mariana and the escape of Gerardo. They force Lemus to go to the division. Cristina is pregnant.
89	38	"Lemus no cede a la presión"	May 30, 2017	1.04
Yolanda and Isidro manage to escape. They interrogate Lemus. El Centauro changes the version about Yolanda's memory loss. She suddenly remembers her wedding and they interpret it as a bad sign.
90	39	"Recuerdos fuera de control"	May 31, 2017	1.06
Julián explains to Emilio the risk of Yolanda recovering his memory. She alters to remember Christina. The Cat infiltrates the territory of El Primo. Cristina wants an abortion.
91	40	"Román conoce a “La Jefa”"	May 31, 2017	1.05
Yolanda must recruit Román. He, terrified of "La Jefa", agrees to be an informant of Los Chacales and does his first job. Leticia takes pictures of El Centauro, Emilio, and Yolanda as evidence.
92	41	"Leticia se arriesga"	June 1, 2017	0.93
Gerardo and company take Ingrid to negotiate an exchange. Yolanda begins to affect the crimes he committed as "La Jefa". Leticia tries to flee, tells Elvira about the note.
93	42	"No hay donde huir"	June 1, 2017	1.02
Leticia fears for her life and calls Rafael. Yolanda reveals her memories. Elvira reads Leticia's note. Find Yolanda's cell phone and see photos of her family. Ana and Gerardo start their façade.
94	43	"Paredes que oyen"	June 2, 2017	0.77
Yolanda wakes up tired of the new treatment. Lemus, frightened by the deterioration of Yolanda, begs Emilio to go ahead with his plan. Roman manipulates evidence. Elvira hears what she should not.
95	44	"Traiciona su placa"	June 2, 2017	0.81
They begin an interrogation to Román guarded by El Centauro and Emilio; El Centauro decides to announce himself. Ana flirts with El Primo to get to the boss. Elvira demands to know the truth about Yolanda.
96	45	"Próximo en la línea"	June 5, 2017	0.83
Ana and Gerardo make love. Nicolás informs on the findings of Rafael. Yolanda gives the idea of getting rid of him. Elvira is about to confess the truth to Yolanda. A baby is on the way.
97	46	"Camaleónica"	June 5, 2017	0.95
Julián believes that Yolanda's mood change is imminent. She sees the heads of the areas and gets ill; The more you remember, the more it becomes clear. Emilio and El Centauro plan new operations.
98	47	"Encajan las fichas de Yolanda"	June 6, 2017	0.94
Yolanda sees photos of Gerardo and his family; Elvira tells the truth. El Centauro orders to share the photos of Ana and Gerardo. They plan to put cameras on Cousin's clothes.
99	48	"Yolanda la de antes"	June 6, 2017	0.98
Yolanda pretends not to notice that she remembers her past. Anxious, she wants to flee and Elvira promises to help. Ana seduces the Cousin. I struggle, hidden, install a microphone. Meeting of superiors.
100	49	"Fingiendo ser la Jefa"	June 7, 2017	0.92
Gerardo and company learn about the new distribution plan. They take the merchandise and see their photos. Emilio senses that Yolanda remembers everything and communicates to Isidro the intention to kill Yolanda.
101	50	"Torturado"	June 7, 2017	0.88
El Diablo thinks that El Primo stole the drug. Ana and Gerardo hear, through the microphone, how they torture him. Emilio suggests that it is La Jefa who demands results, hoping that they will kill her.
102	51	"Yolanda traiciona nuevamente"	June 8, 2017	0.99
Gerardo and company interrupt the meeting of the Jefa. In the shooting, Yolanda escapes and Gerardo follows. She sends a message to El Centauro. He infuriates and realizes that she knows everything.
103	52	"Juntos de nuevo"	June 8, 2017	1.08
Yolanda confronts Lemus, nails a glass around her neck. Gerardo finds her and they escape together. She tells him the facts. Lalo goes after her following the GPS. Elvira is discovered.
104	53	"Detrás de la máscara"	June 9, 2017	0.81
Gerardo takes the chip to Yolanda and they flee. All are cold to know that Yolanda is La Jefa. They question Elvira. The police see the video of the clinic. It is clear that El Centauro is alive.
105	54	"El desahogo de Ana"	June 9, 2017	0.94
Yolanda shares with her family. The meeting with Ana is very uncomfortable. Rafael finds Yolanda's treatment. El Centauro and Emilio plan to kill Rafael and corrupt Javier.
106	55	"Amor silenciado"	June 12, 2017	0.98
Yolanda helps to find El Centauro mansion. She reveals to Gerardo about her wedding to the Capo. Benedicto orders Lalo to kill Elvira in front of him. Javier's wife falls into the trap.
107	56	"La confusión de Gerardo"	June 12, 2017	1.08
Gerardo tries to clarify his feelings. Yolanda suffers an attack, does not distinguish reality and attacks it. Lalo leaves Elvira unconscious. El Centauro offers Javier the position of Raphael.
108	57	"Cuñado venenoso"	June 13, 2017	0.94
Ana dies of pain. Gerardo locks Yolanda, ties her and gags. She reveals that Román works for El Centauro and wants to kill Bianchini. Nicolás has orders to poison his brother-in-law.
109	58	"La otra cara de Mariana"	June 13, 2017	0.95
Yolanda does not remember her family. Rafael breaks his date with Nicolás to see La Madame. She shows him a photo of Nataly, and is shocked. El Centauro changes his plan and sends some hit men.
110	59	"Verdad dolorosa"	June 14, 2017	1.03
Rafael learns that Mariana was a Centauro lover. Sicarios go for him. Yolanda attacks Ana. Tyson and Abel plan to betray Gerardo. The commissioner is on the Capo list.
111	60	"La frustración del Centauro"	June 14, 2017	1.09
El Centauro rages at the failure of his plan. To avoid being killed, Nicolás proposes to find out why the commissioner is blackmailed by his daughter. Rafael updates his uncle and quotes him.
112	61	"Los secretos del Comisionado"	June 15, 2017	1.01
El Centauro and Emilio listen to Adriana's blackmail to her father. Abel assumes that Gerardo and Yolanda are snitches, and take Lucho and the children hostage. Yolanda could have irreversible damage.
113	62	"Ambición sin escrúpulos"	June 15, 2017	1.09
Abel and Tyson, feeling betrayed, kidnap Yolanda, Gerardo and Rafael. Ana and Miguel charge theirs with weapons and money from Gerardo. Adriana receives an offer from El Centauro.
114	63	"Cae un pez gordo"	June 16, 2017	1.04
The Commissioner, pressed by the evidence that his daughter gave to El Centauro, accepts the pact. Tyson releases Yolanda in crisis and hopes that he will attack his family. Appointment in the cemetery.
115	64	"Emboscada en el cementerio"	June 16, 2017	1.17
El Centauro prepares an attack for the appointment of Commissioner and Rafael. Gerardo and Ana, by warning of Erica, try to help Bianchini, but they are outnumbered.
116	65	"Noticia bomba"	June 19, 2017	1.14
They publicly accuse Gerardo, Ana and Tyson of Rafael's crime. Yolanda recognizes the bracelet with the photo of Cirujano. Tyson calls Román and offers to give the Centauro, Gerardo and company.
117	66	"La cruel venganza de Tyson"	June 19, 2017	1.13
Tyson reveals to the Centauro where Yolanda and her family are; In addition, that Ana is daughter of the Surgeon. The tension between Yolanda and Ana grows because of the reliquary. Lalo, under Emilio's suspicion.
118	67	"Benévolo"	June 21, 2017	1.24
The Scythians of El Centauro arrive at Abel's hideout, led by Tyson. He orders his men to leave the place. There is a shooting, Gerardo and company are cornered. Lalo does what he needs.
119	68	"Padre e hijo: divergentes"	June 22, 2017	1.38
The relationship of Emilio and El Centauro is getting worse. Yolanda's health is aggravated; She hides it. Professor Martínez goes to Rafael's funeral, and is terrified to hear Érica.
120	69	"El Centauro usa los medios"	June 23, 2017	1.06
Ana dilutes a pill in Yolanda's drink, causing an attack. The Commissioner and Nicolás dishonor Duarte on the radio. There is a juicy reward for Duarte's head and company.
121	70	"Terapia de impacto"	June 26, 2017	1.19
Professor Martínez uses electroshock to help Yolanda. El Loco proposes to Centauro a business. Ana gives some devices to Érica. The police go to the parish; Everyone is hiding.
122	71	"Señales de vida"	June 27, 2017	1.19
Yolanda wakes up after treatment. Gerardo receives bad news. Emilio and his father face each other. Pictures of Elvira next to Lalo come to light. Martínez is questioned by the police.
123	72	"Intrigas"	June 28, 2017	1.28
Érica manages to install the devices to the Commissioner and Nicolás. Raúl has doubts about what he sees between Gerardo and Ana. The ideas of El Loco seduce El Centauro. Martínez notes that they follow him.
124	73	"Mente asesina"	June 29, 2017	1.17
Ana plans to kill Yolanda. El Centauro and El Loco tell the Commissioner of the new distribution plan. Emilio is looking for an ally. Gerardo and company follow in the steps of the Commissioner.
125	74	"Ana, lista para matar"	June 30, 2017	0.98
Ana prepares the heroine who plans to inject Yolanda. Elvira has her suspicions. While everyone celebrates, Yolanda loses control, attacks Cristina with a knife. Emilio hits El Loco.
126	75	"Sufrimiento silencioso"	July 3, 2017	1.06
Gerardo, very hurt, is forced to tie Yolanda. El Centauro offers El Loco to be the Chief of Los Chacales. Emilio meets with the Commissioner in hiding from his father.
127	76	"A espaldas de El Centauro"	July 4, 2017	0.83
Emilio offers an alliance to the Commissioner. Ana and Gerardo arrive at the place where they meet, to obtain evidence. It comes to light that Tyson's provider tracked Ana.
128	77	"Escurridizos"	July 5, 2017	1.18
Ana and Gerardo spend the night together, and locked up. El Centauro places them. When Yolanda wakes up, everyone at home is frightened by the police presence in the neighborhood and they hide.
129	78	"Vigilancia de narcos"	July 6, 2017	1.13
El Centauro and his men arrive at the warehouse and find the spy teams. Ana and Gerardo face them; He receives a shot. Yolanda and company find a new hiding place.
130	79	"Los tentáculos del Centauro"	July 7, 2017	0.99
El Centauro prevails after torturing the arms supplier. He suspects that Érica and Paula confabulate with Duarte. Adriana does not fall into Paula's trap and submits it. Capo sends her to fetch her.
131	80	"La valentía de Paula"	July 10, 2017	1.06
Paula starts a video call with Érica, and asks her to record everything. Yolanda wakes up in catatonic state. Ana assures Gerardo that they will end up together. Martínez in the sights of El Centauro.
132	81	"El video de Gerardo"	July 11, 2017	1.03
Gerardo shoots a video to send to the media, which causes a lot of commotion. Nicolás records a message. Javier tells Martínez to escape. El Centauro distrusts Emilio and Isidro.
133	82	"Polémica en los medios"	July 12, 2017	1.27
The Commissioner gives a press conference and reveals a secret. Ana takes Gerardo his last love encounter; Everyone listens. Nicolás faces justice and causes great tension.
134	83	"Una mujer despechada"	July 13, 2017	1.13
Ana and Miguel sneak away, steal Lalo's money and take Yolanda. Ana, plan to negotiate with El Centauro and offer her dear. El Capo, unbelieving, imposes a condition.
135	84	"Alianza entre enemigos"	July 14, 2017	1.09
Ana sells Gerardo and company to Centauro. He, seeing that Ana is serious, decides to organize a meeting between her and El Loco. Gerardo and company are surrounded by Isidro and his men.
136	85	"En manos de Javier"	July 17, 2017	1.14
Javier discovers Gerardo and company in the hiding place. Before speaking with El Centauro, Emilio goes ahead and tells Ana that he will be his ally if he is silent about his meeting with El Comisionado
137	86	"Alianzas perdidas o ganadas"	July 18, 2017	1.24
Yolanda escapes. She thinks she's Benedicto's wife. Ana accepts the help of Emilio to recover El Cirujano's card. Javier takes the diary of Lemus al Capo to memorize the route.
138	87	"El secreto de Ana y Emilio"	July 19, 2017	1.19
Ana records a video for the Surgeon's men and Emilio begins to put together the new cartel. El Centauro plans to kill Ana. She and Emilio learn that Yolanda escaped; Pretend in front of the Capo.
139	88	"Ana juega con fuego"	July 20, 2017	1.28
In the middle of the tension with El Capo, Ana delays the delivery of Yolanda one more day. Román goes to the orphanage to check what Javier explained. All but Cristina and El Gato arrive at the hiding place.
140	89	"Operativo en marcha"	July 21, 2017	1.18
Emilio and Ana continue their plan of delivery without Yolanda. When locating to El Centauro, Gerardo and Javier retain the Commissioner and Ramón, to avoid that they warn of the operative against the Capo.
141	90	"La Querida elige su destino"	July 24, 2017	1.46
At the time of delivery, El Centauro notes that his son betrays him. Yolanda is ready to kill; Still thinks that it is the wife of Benedicto, it points to Gerardo and its children with a pistol.
