= 5th Your World Awards =

Annual US media awards show

2016 Premios Tu Mundo
- Date: August 25, 2016
- Location: American Airlines Arena in Miami, Florida
- Country: United States
- Hosted by: Maritza Rodríguez; Carlos Ponce

Television/radio coverage
- Network: Telemundo

2016 Your World Awards is the fifth annual award hosted by Telemundo, which awarded prizes to the beauty, music and telenovela. It aired on August 25, 2016, at 7pm/6c.

== Winners and nominees ==
=== Novelas / Súper Series ===
Novela of the Year	Súper Serie of the Year
Bajo el mismo cielo; Celia; Eva la trailera; La esclava blanca	El Señor de los Cielos 4; La querida del Centauro; Señora Acero 2
Favorite Lead Actress	Favorite Lead Actress of Súper Serie
Danna Paola for ¿Quién es quién?; Edith González for Eva la trailera; María Elisa Camargo for Bajo el mismo cielo; Nerea Camacho for La esclava blanca; Jeimy Osorio for Celia	Fernanda Castillo for El Señor de los Cielos 4; Blanca Soto for Señora Acero 2; Carmen Aub for El Señor de los Cielos 4; Ludwika Paleta for La querida del Centauro; Maritza Rodríguez for El Señor de los Cielos 4
Favorite Lead Actor	Favorite Lead Actor of Súper Serie
Gabriel Porras for Bajo el mismo cielo; Arap Bethke for Eva la trailera; Eugenio Siller for ¿Quién es quién?; Jorge Luis Pila for Eva la trailera; Modesto Lacen for Celia	Rafael Amaya for El Señor de los Cielos 4; Michel Brown for La querida del Centauro; José Luis Reséndez for Señora Acero 2; Humberto Zurita for La querida del Centauro
The Best Bad Girl	The Best Bad Girl of Súper Serie
Erika de la Rosa for Bajo el mismo cielo; Norma Martínez for La esclava blanca; Sandra Destenave for ¿Quién es quién?; Sofia Lama for Eva la trailera	Maricela González for El Señor de los Cielos 4; Luciana Silveyra for Señora Acero 2; Carmen Madrid for La querida del Centauro; Alexandra de la Mora for La querida del Centauro; Christian Tappan for El Señor de los Cielos
The Best Bad Boy	The Best Bad Boy of Súper Serie
Luis Ernesto Franco for Bajo el mismo cielo; Miguel de Miguel for La esclava blanca; Julio Bracho for Bajo el mismo cielo; Jonathan Islas for ¿Quién es quién?; Abel Rodríguez for Celia	Rodrigo Guirao for Señora Acero 2; Plutarco Haza for El Señor de los Cielos 4; Leonardo Daniel for El Señor de los Cielos 4; Jorge Zárate for Señora Acero 2; Christian Tappan for El Señor de los Cielos 4
Favorite Supporting Actress	Favorite Supporting Actress of Super Series
Carolina Gaitán for Celia; Ana Harlen Mosquera for La esclava blanca; Vanessa Bauche for Eva la trailera; Laura Flores for ¿Quién es quién?; Ximena Ayala for Bajo el mismo cielo	Sabrina Seara for El Señor de los Cielos 4; Ana Lucía Domínguez Señora Acero 2; Andrea Martí for La querida del Centauro; Aurora Gil for Señora Acero 2; Litzy for Señora Acero 2
Favorite Supporting Actor	Favorite Supporting Actor of Super Series
Alejandro Speitzer for Bajo el mismo cielo; Carlos Espejel for ¿Quién es quién?; El Dasa for El Vato; Orian Suárez for La esclava blanca; Roberto Mateos for Eva la trailera	Lincoln Palomeque for Señora Acero 2; Alejandro López for El Señor de los Cielos 4; Jorge Luis Moreno for El Señor de los Cielos 4; Mauricio Henao for Señora Acero 2; Ricardo Polanco for La querida del Centauro
The Perfect Couple	The Perfect Couple of Súper Serie
Danna Paola & Eugenio Siller for ¿Quién es quién?; Edith González & Arap Bethke for Eva la trailera; Jeimy Osorio & Modesto Lacen for Celia; Maria Elisa Camargo & Gabriel Porras for Bajo el mismo cielo; Nerea Camacho & Orián Suárez for La esclava blanca	Fernanda Castillo & Rafael Amaya for El Señor de los Cielos 4; Blanca Soto & Lincoln Palomeque for Señora Acero 2; Litzy & Rodrigo Guirao for Señora Acero 2; Ludwika Paleta & Michel Brown for La querida del Centauro
The Best Actor with Bad Luck	Revelation of the Year
Rafael Amaya as Aurelio Casillas; Gabriel Porras as Carlos Martínez; Blanca Soto as Sara Aguilar; Ludwika Paleta as Yolanda Acosta	Gala Montes for El Señor de los Cielos 4; Arantza Ruiz for La querida del Centauro; Michel Duval for Señora Acero 2; Nicole Apollonio for Eva la trailera; Oka Giner for Bajo el mismo cielo

=== Variety ===
Favorite Weekday Program	Favorite Weekend Program
Caso Cerrado; Al Rojo Vivo; Suelta La Sopa; Titulares y Más; Un Nuevo Día	¡Qué Noche! con Angélica y Raúl!; Gran Hermano; La Voz Kids; Larrymania; Ya era hora con Érika y Eduardo
Favorite Entertainment Presenter	Favorite Special or Reality Presenter
Adamari López for Un Nuevo Día; Angélica Vale for ¡Qué Noche! con Angélica y Raúl!; Jorge Bernal for Suelta La Sopa and La Voz Kids; Raúl González for ¡Qué Noche! con Angélica y Raúl!	Gaby Espino for Premios Billboard; Giselle Blondet for Gran Hermano; Lucero for Latin American Music Awards; Pedro Fernández for Premios Billboard
I'm Sexy and I Know It	Fan Club of the Year
Gaby Espino; Ana Lucía Domínguez; Michel Duval; Rafael Amaya; Rodrigo Guirao	#DYArmy – Daddy Yankee; Adamari López Fans – Adamari López; Beasters – Becky G; Boss Bee Nation – Chiquis Rivera; Harmonizers – Fifth Harmony; Roycenaticas – Prince Royce
Favorite Influencer	
Caeli; DJ Khaled; LeJuan James; Lele Pons

=== Music ===
Favorite Mexican Regional Artist	Favorite Pop Artist
Calibre 50; Banda El Recodo de Cruz Lizárraga; Julión Álvarez y Su Norteño Banda; Regulo Caro	Gloria Trevi; Jesse & Joy; Reik; Ricky Martin
Favorite Urban Artist	Favorite Tropical Artist
Daddy Yankee; J Balvin; Maluma; Nicky Jam; Zion & Lennox	Chino & Nacho; Gente de Zona; Prince Royce; Victor Manuelle
Party Starter Song	
"Andas en Mi Cabeza" – Chino & Nacho feat. Daddy Yankee; "Algo Contigo" - Gente de Zona; "Duele el Corazón" – Enrique Iglesias feat. Wisin; "Hasta el Amanecer" – Nicky Jam; "Obsesionado" – Farruko

== Special awards ==
- Estrella de Tu Mundo - Ana Maria Polo
- El Poder En Ti - Intocable
