= Guerra de ídolos =

American telenovela

- Genre: Telenovela
- Created by: Mariano Calasso
- Written by: Carlos Pérez; Tonantzin Elena García
- Directed by: Max Zunino; Liliana Bocanegra
- Starring: Alberto Guerra; María León; Daniel Elbittar; Alejandro de la Madrid; Juan Pablo Medina; José María Torre
- Theme music composer: Yoel Enrique; Andrés Saavedrá; Édgard Barrera
- Opening theme: "Tequila pa' la razón" performed by Los Bambis
- Country of origin: United States
- Original language: Spanish
- No. of episodes: 76

Production
- Executive producers: Carmen Cecilia Urbaneja; Martha Godoy
- Producers: Gerardo Zurita; Nelsón Martínez
- Editors: Catalina Rincón; Hader Antivar
- Camera setup: Multi-camera
- Production companies: Estudios TeleMéxico; Netflix; Fox Telecolombia

Original release
- Network: Telemundo
- Release: April 24 – August 23, 2017

Guerra de ídolos (English title: Price of Fame) is an American telenovela created by Mariano Calasso for Telemundo. It is the first musical telenovela of Telemundo. It was recorded in Mexico.

The telenovela follows the story of the Solar family, and superstar Julio César Solar (Daniel Elbittar), an idol of Mexican Regional music.

The series stars Alberto Guerra as Mateo, María León as Manara, Daniel Elbittar as Julio César, Alejandro de la Madrid as Rafael, Juan Pablo Medina as Amado with the special performance of José María Torre as Isaac.

== Plot ==
Mateo Solar is the best composer and musical producer of the moment, both in the regional and urban genres. Member of a family of artists of Latin origin settled in Houston, he makes the "mistake" of falling in love with Manara; a singer whom they plan to release as a new pop star. But who brought Manara to him was Amado Matamoros, brother of Manara and Julia, trafficker of people and guns, who has controlled the lives of his sisters. Manara, unlike Julia, knows perfectly who is beloved, but keeps it secret to protect her sister, who is the light of his eyes and who has protected her since their mother died. The stormy relationship between Mateo and Manara goes against many interests, triggering ambitions and a war up and down the stages, which will extend from Los Angeles to Houston, and from Monterrey to Mexico City, exposing the most dark side of the world of music.

Mateo finds out that Matamoros had his brother and father killed, now the struggle starts when Mateo wants revenge for the death of his brother and father, while trying to protect Manara the love of his life.

== Cast ==
=== Main ===
- Alberto Guerra as Mateo Solar
- María León as Manara Matamoros
- Daniel Elbittar as Julio César Solar
- Alejandro de la Madrid as Rafael Zabala
- Juan Pablo Medina as Amado Matamoros
- José María Torre as Isaac Solar
- Erika de la Rosa as Selva Treviño
- Marco Treviño as Moisés Solar
- Fernando Carrera as Ernesto Zabala
- Fabiola Campomanes as Itzel Paz
- Carmen Beato as Celestina Solar
- Vince Miranda as Valentín Vargas
- Alex Speitzer as Nicolás Zabala
- Claudio Lafarga as Lorenzo Treviño
- Sheryl Rubio as Julia Matamoros
- Sofía Lama as Gilda Solar
- Ximena Ayala as Agustina Osorio
- Adolfo Arias as Gabriel Treviño
- Viviana Serna as Belinda Guerrero
- Manuel Balbi as David
- Pedro Capó as Dylan Rodríguez
- Luis Figueroa as Diego Santillán
- Christian Pagán as Cristian León
- Alex Garza as Leticia Bravo
- Eduardo Tanus as Santiago Zabala
- Alex Brizuela as Bianco
- Juliana Galvis as La Davis

=== Recurring ===
- Esteban Soberanes as Chalino Andrade
- Daniela Schmidt as Agustina Osorio
- Ricardo Esquerra as Fierro
- Pamela Almaza as Guillermina Sanders
- Fabián Pazzo as Básico
- Aarón Balderi as Lucho Lacalle
- Alejandro Marquina as Renzo Campos
- Tata Ariza as Gisela
- Evelyn Cedeño as Lila
- Patricia Bermúdez as Sabrina
- Edison Ruiz as Alexis Garza
- Maria Adelaida Puerta as Bárbara Montoya
- Ale Müller as Azul Montoya

=== Guest stars ===
- Nicky Jam as Himself
- Zion & Lennox as Themselves
- Ozuna as himself

== Production ==
The series was presented in Telemundo's upfront for the 2016-2017 television season. Filming for the series began in 5 December 2016.

== Reception ==
The series premiered with the episode "Dos pájaros de un tiro" and "Venganza fallida" being watched by 1.03 and 1.12 million viewers respectively. The first ten episodes aired weekdays at 9pm/8c. Due to low ratings Telemundo moved Guerra de ídolos to Saturday's only at the same time of 9pm/8c. La querida del Centauro took over its original time slot.

== Music ==
Guerra de ídolos

Soundtrack album by Various artists
- Released: April 14, 2017
- Recorded: 2016–2017
- Label: Discos Telemundo

Singles from Guerra de ídolos
- 1. "Tequila pa' la razón" Released: March 17, 2017

The first soundtrack of the series, titled Guerra de ídolos, was released on April 17, 2017.

=== Track listing ===
| No. | Title | Length |
|---|---|---|
| 1. | "Ángel con colmillos" (Vince Miranda) | 2:20 |
| 2. | "Tequila pa' la razón" (Luis Figueroa & Christian Pagán) | 3:11 |
| 3. | "Fuego cruzado (Regional)" (Daniel Elbittar) | 2:56 |
| 4. | "Fuego cruzado (Pop)" (Alejandro de la Madrid) | 2:37 |
| 5. | "La protagonista (Regional)" (Daniel Elbittar) | 3:25 |
| 6. | "Hasta el Mariachi va a llorar" (Fernando Carrera) | 3:15 |
| 7. | "Amor y desamor" (María León) | 2:52 |
| 8. | "Despertar" (Alejandro de la Madrid) | 3:10 |
| 9. | "Cuando te veo" (Christian Pagán) | 3:37 |
| 10. | "Que pase la siguiente" (Fernando Carrera) | 2:49 |
| 11. | "No es normal" (Alejandro Speitzer) | 3:24 |
| 12. | "Un día sin reloj" (María León) | 3:22 |
| 13. | "Todo" (Luis Figueroa & Christian Pagán) | 3:29 |
| 14. | "Va a dolerte más que a mí" (Alejandro de la Madrid) | 2:54 |
| 15. | "Me gusta" (María León) | 3:39 |
| 16. | "Sobrenatural" (María León) | 3:09 |
| 17. | "El diplomático" (Vince Miranda) | 2:23 |
| 18. | "En plena oscuridad" (María León) | 3:18 |
| 19. | "No sirve de nada" (José María Torre) | 3:07 |
| 20. | "Mejor sin ti" (Víctor Hugo Arana & Tata Ariza) | 2:54 |
| 21. | "Si alguna vez" (María León) | 3:24 |
| 22. | "No perdamos el tiempo" (Sheryl Rubio) | 3:14 |
| 23. | "Pasa la página" (Alex Brizuela) | 3:03 |
| 24. | "Un millón de veces" (Pedro Capó) | 3:43 |
| 25. | "Poder y gloria" (Fernando Carrera & Alex Garza) | 2:08 |
| 26. | "Si me dejas te dejo" (Evelyn Cedeño & Tata Ariza) | 3:29 |
| 27. | "Una y otra vez" (María León) | 3:14 |
| 28. | "Tantos milagros (Tonto)" (Alejandro Speitzer & Sheryl Rubio) | 1:28 |
| 29. | "Yo sólo quería cantar" (Eduardo Tanus & Alex Garza) | 2:08 |
| 30. | "Once Again" (Pedro Capó) | 3:41 |
| 31. | "Sin ti yo estoy mejor" (Vince Miranda & Evelyn Cedeño) | 3:13 |

== Episodes ==
| No. | Title | Original release date | US viewers (millions) |
|---|---|---|---|
| 1 | "Dos pájaros de un tiro" | April 24, 2017 | 1.03 |
Julio César Solar is shot by order of Amado Matamoros. This seeks to avenge Gabriel Treviño and return the number 1 to Rafael Zabala, in exchange for his support of the mayoralty of LA.
| 2 | "Venganza fallida" | April 24, 2017 | 1.12 |
If he survives, Julio César could lose his voice. Mateo goes after Treviño to get revenge and receives a shot. Amanara suffers, with David, his first amorous disappointment. Beloved gets rid of the traitor.
| 3 | "Más allá de la sangre" | April 25, 2017 | 0.99 |
Gilda suffers for her brother, since she can not sing anymore. Mateo is hurt and unconscious. His friends respond to Treviño's men. To define the future of the Solar and the label.
| 4 | "Tributo al ídolo" | April 26, 2017 | 0.94 |
Treviño orders the death of Valentín. Itzel arrives at the wake. Mateo and Manara meet in the awards room of Julio César. She sings "Fuego Cruzado". Manara and Mateo like them.
| 5 | "Pacto de traidores" | April 28, 2017 | 0.80 |
Amado and Treviño plan to liquidate each other in the tribute to Neto Zabala. Manara convinces Rafael to record a duet in homage to Julio César and wants Mateo to be his producer.
| 6 | "El primer beso" | May 1, 2017 | 0.93 |
Mateo takes Manara to a beautiful viewpoint where they kiss for the first time. El Fierro, the shelter of Amado watches over them. Itzel asks 50% of his property to Rafa, in exchange for the divorce.
| 7 | "Falso homenaje" | May 2, 2017 | 0.84 |
All are reunited to pay tribute to Neto Zabala, while the men of Treviño are ready to destroy Mateo and Amado. Rafa and Manara sing the song homage to Julio César.
| 8 | "Trampa para tercos" | May 3, 2017 | 0.77 |
Amado's men kill Treviño's men in an ambush. Carmelo tries to murder Mateo. Isaac is jealous of Rafa for not having been the one who sang with Manara in the homage.
| 9 | "Uno de sobra" | May 4, 2017 | 0.76 |
Mateo, Rafa and Manara rehearse on the label. Rafa complains to Mateo that he tries to conquer Manara. Mateo denies that between her and him there is any other interest outside the musical. Manara leaves.
| 10 | "Jugando con fuego" | May 5, 2017 | 0.61 |
Manara asks Mateo for distance. He does not want to unleash a confrontation between him and Rafa, now that they are partners in the label, but Mateo ends up kissing her and are preparing to make love.
| 11 | "Voto de confianza" | May 13, 2017 | 0.44 |
The proposal of Rafa with the investors triples the proposal of making a song for Isaac that competes with one of Manara, to define who makes the first disc. Santiago and Fernando kiss.
| 12 | "Confesión de horror" | May 13, 2017 | 0.42 |
Amado confesses to Manara that he killed JC and puts her against the wall so that it ends definitively with Mateo. She is destroyed before the revelation.
| 13 | "Llanto por la verdad" | May 20, 2017 | 0.38 |
Piracy is not the reason for Manara to resign. Mateo asks Manara if he wants to record the single, but there is tension between them. She cries when she can not talk about JC's death.
| 14 | "La sentencia" | May 20, 2017 | 0.27 |
Mateo warns Amado that he will not stay still because Manara likes him very much. Amado, annoying, orders to follow Los Solar. Amado threat to Manara. Fernando is tortured to speak.
| 15 | "Todo es personal" | May 27, 2017 | 0.62 |
Mateo, disconcerted, suspects that Amado has to do with the Manara change. She, who is depressed, decides to break up with Rafa. Amado orders to kill Gilda to prove that she is not playing
| 16 | "Renegociando con el diablo" | May 27, 2017 | 0.55 |
Renzo stabs Gilda in the parking lot and leaves her badly injured. She becomes dead and he runs away when a police patrol arrives. Gilda manages to get in the car and calls Belinda. They operate it.
| 17 | "El nuevo Rafa" | June 3, 2017 | 0.55 |
Renzo's bartender waits until Gilda is left alone. Dylan is with her, singing and falling in love with her. Mateo learns that Diego went to the side of Rafa. Manara, armed awaits Beloved.
| 18 | "El despegue" | June 3, 2017 | 0.49 |
Gilda confesses to Dylan that whoever attacked her had gambling debts with Isaac and asks her not to tell Mateo anything. The paparazzi follows Manara with Rafa and publish photos on the networks.
| 19 | "Jugada sucia" | June 5, 2017 | N/A |
Lorenzo, Elena and Selva propose to write a biography for Amado as part of his campaign for mayor and he accepts. But a pact between Lorenzo and Elena, to destroy it, is in progress.
| 20 | "Difícil elección" | June 6, 2017 | N/A |
Manara faces Mateo and tells him that the photos he saw, do not lie. He senses that Amado is pressing her. Although Mateo is a forbidden love, she can not deny what she feels, but she stays with Rafa.
| 21 | "Chantaje" | June 7, 2017 | N/A |
Rafa confronts Isaac and asks him to do it wrong in the competition, because if not, he will say everything he knows and destroy his life and his career. Rafa wants to get Moses out of the presidency.
| 22 | "Matón en acción" | June 8, 2017 | N/A |
Amado discovers that Fierro and Alexis play behind their backs. They do not know the whereabouts of Fernando, the waiter. He forgives their lives, but they will have to support him in his campaign. Manara asks for help.
| 23 | "Papelón en el escenario" | June 9, 2017 | N/A |
The big day has arrived. Manara and Isaac sing their singles. Rafa makes a trick for Isaac to lose control. Mateo can not believe it. The triumph of Rafa is imminent. Kiss the Manara.
| 24 | "Amargo triunfo" | June 12, 2017 | N/A |
Manara wins the contest and although she should be jumping for joy, she is unable to hide her concern, for not being able to be with Mateo. Rafa offers to be his opening act.
| 25 | "Bajo presión" | June 13, 2017 | N/A |
Rafa and Bianco press Manara to accept, publicly, the proposal of JC Records. To play live and to have real success, is his next step. She feels stabbed in the back.
| 26 | "Negocios son negocios" | June 14, 2017 | N/A |
Mateo and Davis reach an agreement: he composes the narcocorrido for his client and in return requests all the information about Matamoros. Manara has reason to fear her brother.
| 27 | "Amor cómplice" | June 15, 2017 | N/A |
Manara and Mateo discuss. He knows that Amado is a murderer, he deals with people, weapons and washes money. They love each other and remember that he will help her, take her out of the confinement and live a romance without questions.
| 28 | "Agustina, problema para Amado" | June 16, 2017 | N/A |
Agustina expects a baby from Amado, but decides to lie to her before she hurts him. With a knife in hand, he defends himself and announces that the creature's father is not him. Matamoros goes crazy.
| 29 | "Sometidas" | June 19, 2017 | N/A |
Amado threatens Agustina with killing her best man and warns him not to try to escape. She slays Manara and she, armed with courage, says she will tell the whole truth about her crimes.
| 30 | "Con un pie en los negocios" | June 20, 2017 | N/A |
Manara promises to help Amado so that no one provokes scandals, in exchange for letting Agustina have the baby, give Julia more freedom and do not go between Mateo and her.
| 31 | "Peligrosa depresión" | June 21, 2017 | N/A |
Isaac remembers JC and alcoholized and depressed gives a motorcycle ride. Hilda feels guilty about an argument with him. Matthew learns that Isaac has a weapon and is a hardcore player.
| 32 | "Emboscada en Tijuana" | June 22, 2017 | N/A |
Valentín and Básico play live and under threat, the narcocorrido of "El Diplomático" risking life. At the exit, they are stopped by an agent. Mateo tries to avoid it, but Davis prevails.
| 33 | "El futuro de Julia" | June 23, 2017 | N/A |
Manara gets the signature of Matamoros as tutor of Julia to travel to the dance school in London. Although it is difficult for him to move away from Nico, Julia says goodbye giving him a gesture of love.
| 34 | "Isaac a la presidencia" | June 26, 2017 | N/A |
Rafa will have the power and will handle Isaac at his whim. By order of Matamoros, if he does not pay attention, the order is to kill him from an overdose. Julio César Junior, the heir of the Solar is born.
| 35 | "La paz o la guerra" | June 27, 2017 | N/A |
Amado threatens to kill Selva, if Lorenzo publishes the biography that attacks his image and his political career. He proposes peace, until becoming mayor. Otherwise, it will destroy it.
| 36 | "Secuestro en el aire" | June 28, 2017 | N/A |
Carmelo meets Lorenzo Treviño. He places Mateo Solar and convinces him to wait for the call. Lorenzo is threatened at gunpoint during the flight to Monterrey. They remove the phone.
| 37 | "En la boca del lobo" | June 29, 2017 | N/A |
With the excuse of covering the event, for the anniversary of JC's death, Mateo presents the idea to Selva. There, Mateo sees Matamoros face to face, who does not like that alliance at all.
| 38 | "Urge distraer a la prensa" | June 30, 2017 | N/A |
Although Isaac is freed of all charge, the press unfolds all his artillery against him and the recorder. Moses brings the event forward with the children and tries to clean up the company's image.
| 39 | "Frío y distante" | July 3, 2017 | N/A |
Selva and Lorenzo are seen, controlled by Amado's men. She does not understand anything. Lorenzo dissimulates very well. Carmelo arrives and asks him to move away from his business. He calls him a traitor.
| 40 | "La verdad en la cara" | July 4, 2017 | N/A |
Manara, badly toned, confronts Amado and sings everything he knows about his crimes and craving for power. Matamoros justifies the death of JC and Gabriel. Rafa announces his desire for power.
| 41 | "Callejón sin salida" | July 5, 2017 | N/A |
Manara and Bianco do not want Rafa to find out about the friendship they have. It is a priority for her to get out of the hell she's in. A photo is filtered in which they appear kissing.
| 42 | "Fachada" | July 6, 2017 | N/A |
Bianco keeps a secret, which to transcend, would sink him in his career. He confesses it to Manara and they agree to help each other. She will serve as a facade and he in return, will be his promoter in Megavisa.
| 43 | "La pesadilla de Moisés" | July 7, 2017 | N/A |
Moisés finds out the truth and desperate to know who is the author of the death of JC, threatens Isaac with prison; But not for now. Measure the damage, before setting a scandal.
| 44 | "Pacto antes de morir" | July 10, 2017 | N/A |
Don Neto agrees with Amado to guarantee the future of Leticia and a savings account for his grandchildren. Moisés makes a drastic decision that will mark the fate of the Solar. They extort the jungle.
| 45 | "Manara entre dos aguas" | July 11, 2017 | N/A |
Manara runs away with Julia to Mexico. Bianco advances in the preparations of the hiring of the "new artist", although receives a threatening call. Moisés gives up, but sows another challenge.
| 46 | "Lorenzo, como carnada" | July 12, 2017 | N/A |
Mateo insists on knowing the truth about JC's death; Speaks to Amado and asks him to help him find Lorenzo. Gentle and courteous, Amado moves his threads to free him and use him as bait.
| 47 | "Encuentro sorpresa en México" | July 13, 2017 | N/A |
Manara speaks to Mateo and he rages. She justifies her silence by living locked up and threatened by a psychopath. The composer speaks privately with Davis and asks for a special favor.
| 48 | "La prueba de fuego" | July 14, 2017 | N/A |
Moisés, with his grandson in his arms, challenges Rafael to put the money, the product of the sale of Manara to Megavisa, in the name of the heir, until he is older. Mateo approaches Rafa, strategically.
| 49 | "La sangre llama" | July 17, 2017 | N/A |
Although she does not know how, Manara is determined to become the tutor of Julia and at the same time, she wants it to be her opening act on the tour. Julia loves the idea, but does not feel prepared.
| 50 | "Los hilos del poder" | July 18, 2017 | N/A |
Mateo sneaks into the takeover of Matamoros. The mayor wants the media as a tool against defamation. Neto suffers from pain. If you continue, you will have to advance the operation.
| 51 | "JC Records en juego" | July 19, 2017 | N/A |
It came the moment of truth. They leave the results of the competition for the tribute album. The board of directors votes. The presidency of JC Records is yet to be defined. Selva distrusts Amado.
| 52 | "A punto de ser alcalde" | July 20, 2017 | N/A |
All ready for the taking of power of Amado. He arrives armed. Manara loves Mateo, but he is disappointed. Surprised with another. Rafa is drunk and Amado wants him in the event anyway.
| 53 | "Atentado" | July 21, 2017 | N/A |
The inauguration of Matamoros becomes a space for chaos and panic. Alexis controls the press and prevents it from transcending the truth. Manara in trouble for singing for Amado.
| 54 | "Manara cae en la trampa" | July 24, 2017 | N/A |
Rafa visits Amado in the hospital. He steals the painkillers. Convince Manara to talk to him and give him to drink adulterated water. He loses consciousness. He records a video.
| 55 | "Testigos amañados" | July 25, 2017 | N/A |
Gisela gives statements. Selva faces Lucho and tells him that he will be fired, if he finds out that everything is to please Amado. If Manara cheats on him again, he'll hurt Mateo.
| 56 | "Carrera o escándalo" | July 26, 2017 | N/A |
Manara is outraged, because Ezequiel, the owner of Megavisa, advises him not to raise gunpowder. A scandal would ruin his career. He will overlook the "dumb" he committed in public.
| 57 | "Hermanos en la clandestinidad" | July 27, 2017 | N/A |
Mateo and Isaac ask to be sincere. Isaac admits that Rafa wanted to blackmail him, but he did not let him. Mateo tells Isaac that the official version is not real. Behind him, Isaac negotiates with Rafa.
| 58 | "Les pisan los talones" | July 28, 2017 | N/A |
Amado's men arrive at the address where Matthew and his friends are. They come in cleanly. Amado turns to Rafa to find out how much Moses knows about JC's crime.
| 59 | "Mateo se retira" | July 31, 2017 | N/A |
Isaac and Matthew make a deal. They meet with Moses to redefine the power quotas on the record label. Leticia faces Rafa. If something happens to you, you have records of everything you know about JC.
| 60 | "Manara, armada de coraje" | August 1, 2017 | N/A |
They record Manara's testimony against Amado, but the lawyer needs evidence. Belinda confesses her relationship with Isaac. Matamoros wants to cause an accident to the Solar.
| 61 | "Otro crimen de Amado" | August 2, 2017 | N/A |
Moses, from the plane, calls Mateo. Manara announces to the love of his life that he made a decision to prevent more people from getting hurt. Beloved, you now know how powerful the Diplomat is.
| 62 | "Asesino sin escrúpulos" | August 3, 2017 | N/A |
Mateo ties up and realizes that Isaac gave his location and that of his father. He suspects that it is the work of Amado. Isaac threatens Rafa for believing him an accomplice. Agustina is "away" and Manara is going to see her.
| 63 | "El Diplomático da la cara" | August 4, 2017 | N/A |
Finally, Mateo meets El Diplomático. He explains that a good plan takes time and a lot of patience. Badly toned, he tells him that he feels betrayed. Gunmen attack the Mayor.
| 64 | "Manara tiene un aliado" | August 7, 2017 | N/A |
Lorenzo represents Julia as his lawyer in the contract dispute with Megavisa. But that is not the only reason to see Manara. Mateo has a mission with The Diplomat.
| 65 | "Presionan a Mateo" | August 8, 2017 | N/A |
Mateo wants to recover the record and avenge the death of his brother, but he has no choice but to please the Diplomat and prove what he knows. A policeman requests documents from Sabrina.
| 66 | "Solar vs Solar" | August 9, 2017 | N/A |
Isaac confesses to Mateo that he "sold" him to the police for not voting for him on the record label. Manara, exhausted, they recommend her some pills to recover the energy. They threaten Matamoros.
| 67 | "Discreción absoluta" | August 10, 2017 | N/A |
Manara wakes up and asks about the results of the analyzes, which Bianco hides. Julia infuriates with Amado, he mistreats her and she slaps him. Jungle discovers how violent her boyfriend is.
| 68 | "Selva abre los ojos" | August 11, 2017 | N/A |
For striking a woman, Selva tastes miserable to Amado, face to face. Although he excuses himself, she asks for time. Face the truth about Agustina and him. They accept Celestina in the Directive.
| 69 | "Mateo, mediador entre malfiosos" | August 14, 2017 | N/A |
Mateo must make the diplomat "appear" before the eyes of Beloved. If his "partner" does not give in, he threatens to kill three women. Hilda tries to compromise with Amado, to see beyond fusion.
| 70 | "Embarazo dudoso" | August 15, 2017 | N/A |
Bianco tells the truth to Manara about her pregnancy and the risk involved in her plans with Megavisa. The doubt is, if that baby is a product of love or rape, which was the victim.
| 71 | "Evidencia en video" | August 16, 2017 | N/A |
Manara prefers her private life to her work. Sign by conviction, will not interrupt her pregnancy. Bianco wants to buy the video that Rafa recorded abusing Manara. Santi and his grandfather will be duets.
| 72 | "Mateo arriesga el pellejo" | August 17, 2017 | N/A |
Mateo breaks the rules imposed by The Diplomat. He can not believe that Manara did not report the violation. Beloved, he orders him to be killed, but he will humiliate him first, publicly. Jungle must stand.
| 73 | "Amado a la caza de Mateo" | August 18, 2017 | N/A |
A document issued by the prosecutor frees Mateo from all charges that could weigh against him. So, you can go back to LA. Anai wants Bianco to destroy Manara before the press.
| 74 | "Rafa en serios problemas" | August 21, 2017 | N/A |
Mateo faces Rafa, this time with a video that promises to destroy him. Lorenzo represents Manara against Megavisa; Has a business proposal with the Treviño companies. Manara will move.
| 75 | "Anuncio escandaloso" | August 22, 2017 | N/A |
Amado gains time. He owes a response to The Diplomat. Look for Jungle, but she's gone. Lorenzo faces him unarmed. Isaac dedicates a theme to his father, his brother and "his beloved" Belinda.
| 76 | "Manara, entre la vida y la muerte" | August 23, 2017 | N/A |
After the crime of Lorenzo, Selva and Manara are more united than ever. They know who did it. Matamoros, hooded, bribes the custodian of the stadium where Manara appears. Mateo calls 911.

== Awards and nominations ==
| Year | Award | Category | Recipient | Result |
|---|---|---|---|---|
| 2017 | Your World Awards | Favorite Series | Guerra de ídolos | Nominated |
| 2017 | Your World Awards | Favorite Lead Actor | Alberto Guerra | Nominated |
| 2017 | Your World Awards | Favorite Lead Actress | María León | Nominated |
| 2017 | Your World Awards | Soy Sexy And I Know It | Alberto Guerra | Nominated |
