= 6th Your World Awards =

2017 US media awards show

2017 Premios Tu Mundo
- Date: August 24, 2017
- Location: American Airlines Arena in Miami, Florida
- Country: United States
- Hosted by: Carmen Villalobos; Daniel Sarcos; Fernanda Castillo

Television/radio coverage
- Network: Telemundo

The 6th Your World Awards is the sixth annual award hosted by Telemundo, which awarded prizes to the beauty, music and telenovela. It was broadcast on August 24, 2017, at 8pm/7c.

Puerto Rican singer, Olga Tañón was honored with the Jenni Rivera Legacy Award in recognition of her career and philanthropic achievements. Panamanian-born singer, Miguel Bosé was awarded the El Poder en Ti (The Power In You) award for his philanthropic achievements. Telemundo honored Puerto Rican journalist, María Celeste Arrarás with the Estrella de Tu Mundo (Star of Your World) award to celebrate 15 years of hosting the news show Al Rojo Vivo.

== Winners and nominees ==
=== Series ===
Favorite Series	Favorite Súper Series
La Doña; Guerra de ídolos; La Fan; Silvana sin lana; Sin senos sí hay paraíso	El Señor de los Cielos; El Chema; La querida del Centauro; Señora Acero
Favorite Lead Actor	Favorite Lead Actress
Rafael Amaya for El Señor de los Cielos; Alberto Guerra for Guerra de ídolos; Carlos Ponce for Silvana sin lana; David Chocarro for La Doña; Fabián Ríos for Sin senos sí hay paraíso; Juan Pablo Espinosa for La Fan; Luis Ernesto Franco for Señora Acero; Mauricio Ochmann for El Chema; Michel Brown for La querida del Centauro	Aracely Arámbula for La Doña; Angélica Vale for La Fan; Carolina Gaitán for Sin senos sí hay paraíso; Carolina Miranda for Señora Acero; Catherine Siachoque for Sin senos sí hay paraíso; Fernanda Castillo for El Señor de los Cielos; Ludwika Paleta for La querida del Centauro; María León for Guerra de ídolos; Maritza Rodríguez for Silvana sin lana
The Best Bad Boy	The Best Bad Girl
José María Galeano for La Doña; Gabriel Porras for La Fan; Humberto Zurita for La querida del Centauro; Jorge Luis Moreno for El Señor de los Cielos; José María Torre for Señora Acero; Sergio Basañez for El Chema	Majida Issa for Sin senos sí hay paraíso; Gaby Espino for Señora Acero; Mariana Seoane for El Chema; Marimar Vega for Silvana sin lana; Marisela González for El Señor de los Cielos; Scarlet Ortiz for La Fan
Favorite Actor	Favorite Actress
Juan Pablo Urrego for Sin senos sí hay paraíso; Jonathan Islas for La Fan; Michel Duval for Señora Acero; Odiseo Bichir for La Doña; Plutarco Haza for El Señor de los Cielos; Ricardo Abarca for Silvana sin lana	Carmen Aub for El Señor de los Cielos; Adriana Barraza for Silvana sin lana; Catherine Siachoque for Sin senos sí hay paraíso; Danna Paola for La Doña; Itatí Cantoral for El Chema; Ximena Duque for La Fan
The Perfect Couple	The Best Actor with Bad Luck
David Chocarro and Aracely Arámbula for La Doña; Carlos Ponce and Maritza Rodríguez for Silvana sin lana; Juan Pablo Urrego and Carolina Gaitán for Sin senos sí hay paraíso; Luis Ernesto Franco and Carolina Miranda for Señora Acero; Mauricio Ochmann and Mariana Seoane for El Chema; Rafael Amaya and Fernanda Castillo for El Señor de los Cielos	Carolina Gaitán for Sin senos sí hay paraíso; Angélica Vale for La Fan; Carlos Ponce for Silvana sin lana; David Chocarro for La Doña
Soy Sexy and I Know It	
Carmen Villalobos for Sin senos sí hay paraíso; Alberto Guerra for Guerra de ídolos; Ana Lucía Domínguez for Señora Acero; Juan Pablo Llano for Sin senos sí hay paraíso; Majida Issa for Sin senos sí hay paraíso; Michel Duval for Señora Acero

=== Music ===
Favorite Regional Mexican Artist by iHeartRadio	Favorite Tropical Artist by iHeartRadio
Gerardo Ortiz; Banda Sinaloense MS de Sergio Lizárraga; Calibre 50; Julión Álvarez y Su Norteño Banda; La Arrolladora Banda El Limón de René Camacho; La Séptima Banda	Prince Royce; Carlos Vives; Gente de Zona; Héctor Acosta “El Torito”; Romeo Santos; Víctor Manuelle
Favorite Pop Artist by iHeartRadio	Favorite Urban Artist by iHeartRadio
CNCO; Enrique Iglesias; Juanes; Luis Fonsi; Reik; Shakira	Maluma; J Balvin; Nicky Jam; Wisin; Yandel; Zion & Lennox
Party-Starter Song by iHeartRadio	
Hey DJ by CNCO ft. Yandel; Báilame by Nacho; Despacito by Luis Fonsi ft. Daddy Yankee; Las Ultras by Calibre 50; Me Enamoré by Shakira; Súbeme La Radio by Enrique Iglesias ft. Descemer Bueno, Zion & Lennox

=== Variety ===
Favorite Influencer	Favorite Presenter
Johann Vera; Amanda Cerny; Baby Ariel; Christian Acosta	Jorge Bernal for Suelta La Sopa; Ana María Polo for Caso Cerrado; Daniel Sarcos for Un Nuevo Día; Don Francisco for Don Francisco Te Invita; María Celeste Arrarás for Al Rojo Vivo; Rashel Díaz for Un Nuevo Día
Fan Club of the Year	Favorite Program
CNCOwners (CNCO); Arianators (Ariana Grande); Beasters (Becky G); Carmen Villalobos Fans (Carmen Villalobos); Malumaticas (Maluma)	Un Nuevo Día; Al Rojo Vivo; Caso Cerrado; Don Francisco Te Invita; Suelta la Sopa; Titulares y Más
