= Your World Awards for Favorite Lead Actor =

Telenovela award

Premios Tu Mundo for Favorite Lead Actor
- Awarded for: Favorite Lead Actor
- Country: United States
- Presented by: Telemundo
- First award: 2012
- Currently held by: Novela: Rafael Amaya (2017); Súper series: Rafael Amaya (2015–16)

The Premios Tu Mundo for Your Favorite Lead Actor is a category created by Premios Tu Mundo, presented by Telemundo, to choose the best favorite actor of telenovelas. So far the only actor, who has won this award consecutively was Jencarlos Canela. In 2014, the actor Rafael Amaya won.

== Winners and nominees ==
=== Novelas ===
Winner	Nominated
1st Your World Awards
Jencarlos Canela for Mi corazón insiste en Lola Volcán	Eugenio Siller for Una Maid en Manhattan; Gabriel Coronel for Relaciones peligrosas; Gabriel Porras for La casa de al lado; José Luis Reséndez for Corazón valiente
2nd Your World Awards
Jencarlos Canela for Pasión prohibida	Andrés Parra for Pablo Escobar, el patrón del mal; Jorge Luis Pila for La Patrona; Rafael Amaya for El Señor de los Cielos
3rd Your World Awards
Rafael Amaya for El Señor de los Cielos	Aarón Díaz for Santa Diabla; David Chocarro for En otra piel; Jorge Luis Pila for En otra piel
4th Your World Awards
Christian de la Campa for Tierra de reyes	Aarón Díaz for Tierra de reyes; Gonzalo García Vivanco for Tierra de reyes; Jorge Luis Pila for En otra piel; Eugenio Siller for Reina de corazones
5th Your World Awards
Gabriel Porras for Bajo el mismo cielo	Arap Bethke for Eva la trailera; Eugenio Siller for ¿Quién es quién?; Jorge Luis Pila for Eva la trailera; Modesto Lacen for Celia
6th Your World Awards
Rafael Amaya for El Señor de los Cielos	Alberto Guerra for Guerra de ídolos; Carlos Ponce for Silvana sin lana; David Chocarro for La Doña; Fabián Ríos for Sin senos sí hay paraíso; Juan Pablo Espinosa for La Fan; Luis Ernesto Franco for Señora Acero; Mauricio Ochmann for El Chema; Michel Brown for La querida del Centauro

=== Súper series (2015–16) ===
Winner	Nominated
4th Your World Awards
Rafael Amaya for El Señor de los Cielos	José María Torre for Dueños del paraíso; Jorge Zabaleta for Dueños del paraíso; Andrés Palacios for Señora Acero
5th Your World Awards
Rafael Amaya for El Señor de los Cielos	Michel Brown for La querida del Centauro; Humberto Zurita for La querida del Centauro; José Luis Reséndez for Señora Acero
