= Gran Hermano (American TV series) =

- Presented by: Giselle Blondet
- No. of days: 92
- No. of contestants: 16
- Winner: Pedro Orta
- Runner-up: Yajayra "Yaya" García

Release
- Original network: Telemundo
- Original release: 10 January – 10 April 2016

Gran Hermano (also known as Gran Hermano USA) is the Spanish-language adaptation of the reality television franchise Big Brother, broadcast in the United States on Telemundo and produced by Endemol. The series was announced in May 2015 during the network's upfront presentation for the 2015–16 television season in New York City.

This is the official adaptation of the international Big Brother format for Hispanic television in the U.S., making the United States the third country worldwide, after Canada and India, to have different adaptations of the show based on language. Former Nuestra Belleza Latina host Giselle Blondet was announced as the show's presenter on December 14, 2015. The show premiered on January 10, 2016, and lasted 13 weeks.

== Format ==
Based on the original Dutch version created by Endemol, the show sees a number of different housemates, divided by gender, social backgrounds and geographical locations locked up together in a House, where the viewing public can watch them twenty-four hours a day, and vote them out of the House as they choose to. The housemates live in isolation from the outside world in a house custom built with everyday objects, like fridges and a garden. The house also includes cameras and microphones in most of the rooms to record all of the activity in the house. The confession room is the only place where housemates can be away from the other contestants, where they can confess their true feelings. The winner is the last contestant remaining in the house and receives a cash prize of US$250,000. Housemates are evicted weekly throughout the show by the public via text messaging, cellphone calls, the show's main website, and Facebook.

== Housemates ==
The housemates of Gran Hermano USA Top: Pedro Orta, Agustín Flores, Carlos Uriarte, Jason Rosales and Dante Delgadillo Second row: Domingo Navarro, Maday Velázquez, Carolina Catalino, Yajayra García and Melissa Saldívar Third row: Catalina Naranjo, Iselis Arzola, Rafael Caparroso and Jommart Rivera Not pictured: Andrea González and Elizabeth Prado

Name	Age	Occupation	From	Residence	Day entered	Day exited	Status
Pedro Orta	42	Personal trainer	Puerto Rico		1	92	Winner
Yajayra García	25	Social Worker	Mexico	Texas	1	92	Runner-up
Domingo Navarro	44	Maintenance staff	Dominican Republic	New York	1	92	3rd Place
Jommart Rivera	40	Teacher	Puerto Rico	Florida	1	92	4th Place
Elizabeth Prado	35	Beauty Salon owner	Mexico	California	36	85	13th Evicted
Rafael Caparroso	26	Actor & model	Colombia	Florida	50	85	12th Evicted
Rafael Caparroso	26	Actor & model	Colombia	Florida	1	8	1st Evicted
Andrea González	24	Oil company employee	Venezuela	Texas	36	78	11th Evicted
Agustín Flores	32	Gardener	Mexico	Illinois	1	71	10th Evicted
Maday Velázquez	21	Model	Cuba	Pennsylvania	1	64	9th Evicted
Dante Delgadillo	32	Customer service	Mexico	Texas	1	57	8th Evicted
Jason Rosales	27	DJ	Honduras	Indiana	1	50	7th Evicted
Carlos Uriarte	27	Real estate broker	Mexico	Texas	1	43	6th Evicted
Melissa Saldívar	34	Boxing gym owner	Mexico	Texas	1	36	5th Evicted
Iselis Arzola	21	Student	Cuba	Florida	1	29	4th Evicted
Catalina Naranjo	28	Businesswoman	Colombia	Florida	1	22	3rd Evicted
Carolina Catalino	33	Model	Dominican Republic	New York	1	15	2nd Evicted

== Nominations table ==
The first housemate in each box was nominated for three points, the second housemate was nominated for two points, the third housemate was nominated for one point.

This housemate was the house leader, and could not be nominated.
This housemate was immune from eviction.
This housemate was evicted.
This housemate was automatically put up for eviction by Big Brother.

	Week 1	Week 2	Week 3	Week 4	Week 5	Week 6		Week 7	Week 8	Week 9	Week 10	Week 11	Week 12	Week 13 Final		Nomims. received
Leader	Yajayra	Melissa	Iselis	Yajayra	Agustín	Dante		Domingo	Agustín	Andrea	Elizabeth	Jommart	None			Nomims. received
Red phone	Carolina	Jason	Jason	Dante	Agustín	Maday	Jason	Jason	Rafael	Jommart	Rafael	Pedro	Domingo	Yajayra		Nomims. received
Used on:	Carolina	Melissa	Melissa	Dante	Agustín	Andrea	Elizabeth	Jason	All Housemates	Jommart	Rafael	Pedro	All Housemates	All Housemates		Nomims. received
Pedro	~~Carolina~~; Maday; Jason	Carolina; Iselis; Carlos	Dante; Catalina; Carlos	Melissa; Iselis; Carlos	Melissa; Jason; Carlos	Jason; Carlos; Maday		Maday; Jason; Dante	Dante; Andrea; Maday	~~Jommart~~; ~~Elizabeth~~; ~~Maday~~	Yajayra; Agustín; Jommart	Yajayra; Elizabeth; Andrea	Elizabeth; Yajayra; Domingo	Winner (Day 92)		86
Yajayra	Catalina; Iselis; Maday	Catalina; Iselis; Jason	Catalina; Jason; Dante	Iselis; Jason; Dante	Jason; Dante; Carlos	Carlos; Jason; Jommart		Andrea; Elizabeth; Jason	Elizabeth; Dante; Andrea	Elizabeth; Rafael; Jommart	Rafael; Andrea; Pedro	Elizabeth; Andrea; Rafael	Rafael; Jommart; Elizabeth	Runner-up (Day 92)		43
Domingo	Jason; Maday; Carlos	Catalina; Iselis; Jason	Melissa; Catalina; Jason	Iselis; Jason; Melissa	Melissa; Carlos; Jason	Jason; Carlos; Maday		Jason; Maday; Dante	Dante; Maday; Andrea	Maday; Yajayra; Rafael	Andrea; Rafael; Jommart	Andrea; Elizabeth; Rafael	Jommart; Rafael; Elizabeth	Third place (Day 92)		64
Jommart	~~Carolina~~; Agustin; Maday	Iselis; Carolina; Maday	Melissa; Catalina; Maday	Melissa; Iselis; Carlos	Melissa; Carlos; Maday	Jason; Carlos; Maday		Maday; Elizabeth; Jason	Andrea; Elizabeth; Maday	Maday; Agustín; Elizabeth	Rafael; Andrea; Pedro	Andrea; Elizabeth; Rafael	Rafael; Elizabeth; Yajayra	Fourth place (Day 92)		65
Elizabeth	Not in House					Exempt		Jason; Maday; Andrea	Pedro; Jommart; Domingo	Rafael; Yajayra; Jommart	Agustín; Yajayra; Jommart	Yajayra; Domingo; Rafael	Pedro; Rafael; Jommart	Evicted (Day 85)		39
Rafael	Iselis; Dante; Jason	Evicted (Day 8)							Dante; Andrea; Elizabeth	~~Jommart~~; ~~Elizabeth~~; ~~Maday~~	Agustín; Jommart; Yajayra	Yajayra; Domingo; Elizabeth	Yajayra; Jommart; Domingo	Re-evicted (Day 85)		52
Andrea	Not in House					Exempt		Agustín; Yajayra; Jommart	Pedro; Domingo; Maday	Maday; Jommart; Yajayra	Jommart; Agustín; Yajayra	Yajayra; Domingo; Pedro	Evicted (Day 78)			41
Agustín	Jommart; Rafael; Pedro	Jommart; Jason; Catalina	Catalina; Jason; Jommart	Iselis; Jason; Jommart	Not eligible	Carlos; Jason; Jommart		Jason; Andrea; Dante	Andrea; Dante; Rafael	Rafael; Jommart; Pedro	Andrea; Rafael; Pedro	Evicted (Day 71)				25
Maday	Jommart; Iselis; Jason	Carlos; Catalina; Jason	Carlos; Catalina; Jason	Iselis; Jason; Carlos	Carlos; Jason; Jommart	Jommart; Pedro; Domingo		Elizabeth; Andrea; Pedro	Pedro; Andrea; Elizabeth	Elizabeth; Jommart; Pedro	Evicted (Day 64)					39
Dante	Rafael; ~~Carolina~~; Pedro	Pedro; Domingo; Carolina	Pedro; Domingo; Yajayra	Pedro; Domingo; Agustin	Pedro; Domingo; Melissa	Pedro; Domingo; Jommart		Agustín; Pedro; Elizabeth	Pedro; Domingo; Rafael	Evicted (Day 57)						25
Jason	Rafael; ~~Carolina~~; Maday	Carolina; Pedro; Domingo	Domingo; Yajayra; Pedro	Pedro; Domingo; Agustin	Pedro; Domingo; Melissa	Domingo; Jommart; Pedro		Agustín; Pedro; Jommart	Evicted (Day 50)							65
Carlos	Rafael; Maday; Jommart	Carolina; Pedro; Domingo	Pedro; Yajayra; Domingo	Pedro; Domingo; Jommart	Pedro; Jommart; Domingo	Pedro; Domingo; Jommart		Evicted (Day 43)								38
Melissa	Iselis; Catalina; Carlos	Domingo; Pedro; Iselis	Domingo; Jommart; Jason	Jommart; Domingo; Pedro	Jommart; Domingo; Pedro	Evicted (Day 36)										25
Iselis	Rafael; ~~Carolina~~; Melissa	Domingo; Pedro; Carolina	Yajayra; Domingo; Pedro	Pedro; Domingo; Jommart	Evicted (Day 29)											38
Catalina	Rafael; Domingo; Jason	Carolina; Domingo; Pedro	Yajayra; Pedro; Domingo	Evicted (Day 22)												29
Carolina	Jommart; Iselis; Pedro	Pedro; Carlos; Catalina	Evicted (Day 15)													28
Notes	1	2	3	4	5	6		7, 8	9	10, 11	none					
Against public vote	Iselis; Jommart; Rafael	Carolina; Domingo; Pedro	Catalina; Domingo; Yajayra	Dante; Domingo; Iselis; Pedro	Carlos; Melissa; Pedro	Carlos; Jason; Jommart; Pedro		Agustín; Jason; Maday	Andrea; Dante; Pedro	Jommart; Maday; Pedro; Rafael	Agustín; Andrea; Rafael	Andrea; Elizabeth; Yajayra	Elizabeth; Jommart; Rafael	Domingo; Jommart; Pedro; Yajayra		
Evicted	Rafael; 35.4% to evict	Carolina; Most votes to evict	Catalina; Most votes to evict	Iselis; Most votes to evict	Melissa; Most votes to evict	Carlos; Most votes to evict		Rafael; Most votes to return	Dante; 55.1% to evict	Maday; 51.6% to evict	Agustín; 55.5% to evict	Andrea; 55.4% to evict	Rafael; 39.36% to evict	Jommart; 15.0% to win	Domingo; 22.3% to win	
Evicted	Rafael; 35.4% to evict	Carolina; Most votes to evict	Catalina; Most votes to evict	Iselis; Most votes to evict	Melissa; Most votes to evict	Carlos; Most votes to evict		Jason; Most votes to evict	Dante; 55.1% to evict	Maday; 51.6% to evict	Agustín; 55.5% to evict	Andrea; 55.4% to evict	Elizabeth; 38.22% to evict	Yajayra; 24.7% to win		
Saved	Iselis; 35.1% Jommart; 29.5%	Domingo; Pedro; Fewest votes	Domingo; Yajayra; Fewest votes	Dante; Domingo; Pedro; Fewest votes	Carlos; Pedro; Fewest votes	Jason; Jommart; Pedro; Fewest votes		Agustín; Maday; Fewest votes	Pedro; 36.6% Andrea; 8.3%	Pedro; 29.8% Rafael; 9.9% Jommart; 8.7%	Andrea; 26.6% Rafael; 17.9%	Yajayra; 30.6% Elizabeth; 13.9%	Jommart; 22.42%	Pedro; 38.0% to win		

=== Notes ===
- ^Note 1: On Day 1, Carolina answered the red phone and was secretly informed that she was immune. The votes of other houseguests against her didn't count.
- ^Note 2: On Day 8, Jason answered the red phone and was told that he had to grant someone immunity. He picked Melissa. Melissa was also the house leader that week, effectively nullifying the immunity she had been granted, as the other houseguests couldn't vote for her anyway.
- ^Note 3: On Day 15, Jason answered the red phone and was told he had to void someone's nominations. He chose to void Melissa's nominations. This option was later revoked because Jason did not follow the rules and told other people that Melissa's nomination votes would not count.
- ^Note 4: On Day 22, Dante answered the red phone and was automatically nominated for eviction.
- ^Note 5: On Day 29, Agustín answered the red phone and was given two options: he was offered $1,000 in exchange for his nomination points, or he could reject the deal but be forced to wear a carrot costume for a period of 48 hours. He chose to take the money and was not eligible to nominate.
- ^Note 6: On Day 36, Andrea and Elizabeth entered the house as new houseguests. They were immune from nomination and eviction and were ineligible to nominate that week.
- ^Note 7: On Day 43, Jason answered the red phone and was given the task to put on a sign over his clothes, which said that he could not talk to anyone at all and had to keep the sign in place until Wednesday's nominations. In doing so he was granted the chance to give nomination scores of 4, 3, and 2 instead of the usual scores of 3, 2, and 1. He was unsuccessful and received an automatic 4 points against him in Wednesday's nominations as a result.
- ^Note 8: On Day 50, Rafael returned to the house as an official houseguest via a public vote against Carlos and Iselis.
- ^Note 9: On Day 50, Rafael answered the red phone shortly after re-entering the house. He received a cake celebrating the 50-day mark of everyone's stay in the house.
- ^Note 10: On Day 57, Jommart answered the red phone and received a phone call from home.
- ^Note 11: On Day 59, Pedro and Rafael agreed on nominating the remaining female houseguests, despite the fact that Big Brother had specified that 'conspiring' about nominations to rig the results was against the rules. As a result, both of them had their nominations voided, and were automatically put up for eviction along with Jommart and Maday, who had the most nominations.

== Total received nominations ==
	Week 1	Week 2	Week 3	Week 4	Week 5	Week 6	Week 7	Week 8	Week 9	Week 10	Week 11	Week 12	Week 13	Total
Pedro	3	15	10	13	10	9	5	12	2	3	1	3	Winner	86
Yajayra	0	0	11	0	0	0	2	0	5	7	12	6	Runner-up	43
Domingo	2	12	12	10	7	8	0	5	0	0	6	2	3rd Place	64
Jommart	10	3	3	6	6	9	2	2	8	8	0	8	4th Place	65
Elizabeth	Not in House					0	8	7	7	0	10	7	Evicted	39
Rafael	17	Evicted						2	9	10	4	10	Re-evicted	52
Andrea	Not in House					0	8	14	0	10	9	Evicted		41
Agustín	2	0	0	2	0	0	9	0	2	10	Evicted			25
Maday	9	1	1	0	1	3	10	5	9	Evicted				39
Dante	2	0	4	1	2	0	3	13	Evicted					25
Jason	7	5	7	8	8	13	13+4	Evicted						65
Carlos	2	6	4	5	9	12	Evicted							38
Melissa	1	0	6	7	11	Evicted								25
Iselis	12	10	0	16	Evicted									38
Catalina	5	10	14	Evicted										29
Carolina	~~12~~	16	Evicted											28

== Awards and nominations ==
Year	Award	Category	Recipient	Result
2016	Premios Tu Mundo	Favorite Weekend Program	Gran Hermano USA	Nominated
2016	Premios Tu Mundo	Favorite Special or Reality Presenter	Giselle Blondet	Nominated
