= La querida del Centauro =

- Genre: Telenovela
- Created by: Lina Uribe; Darío Vanegas
- Written by: Jacques Bonnavent; Marcela Rodríguez; Margarita Londoño
- Directed by: Mauricio Cruz; Rodrigo Ugalde De Haene; Javier Solar
- Creative director: Ana Magis
- Starring: Humberto Zurita; Ludwika Paleta; Michel Brown; Alexandra de la Mora; Irene Azuela; Sandra Echeverría
- Music by: Luis Ortega; Camilo Froideval
- Opening theme: "Chaliwa"
- Country of origin: United States
- Original language: Spanish
- No. of seasons: 2
- No. of episodes: 141 (list of episodes)

Production
- Executive producers: Juan Pablo Posada; Andrés Santamaria; Gabriela Valentán; Daniel Ucros
- Cinematography: Santiago Sánchez; Josué Eber Morales; Luis Ávila
- Camera setup: Multi-camera
- Running time: 45 minutes
- Production companies: Telemundo Studios; Sony Pictures Television International; Teleset

Original release
- Network: Telemundo
- Release: January 12, 2016 – July 24, 2017

La querida del Centauro (Lit: The Dear of the Centaur / English: Centauro's Woman), is a Spanish-language telenovela produced by Teleset and Sony Pictures Television for Telemundo and distributed by Telemundo Internacional, based on an original idea of Lina Uribe and Dario Vanegas. The series follows the life of El Centauro and his ambition to have Yolanda as his wife.

The series features a large ensemble cast, including Humberto Zurita, Ludwika Paleta, Michel Brown, Alexandra de la Mora, Irene Azuela and Sandra Echeverría as starring cast.

== Synopsis ==
=== Season 1 (2016) ===
The first season chronicles the life of Yolanda, an attractive and intelligent prisoner, that becomes the mistress of one of the most important drug traffickers of Mexico, Benedictino García, alias "El Centauro". This relationship, which inside the prison will give much power to Yolanda, will end up becoming her worst nightmare when she manages to be released thanks to Gerardo, a shrewd detective whose last years have been dedicated to the fight against drug trafficking. With El Centauro in hiding, Gerardo decides to use Yolanda as bait in an operation that will take them to the hiding place of El Centauro.

=== Season 2 (2017) ===
The second season tells the story of the Centauro revenge against Yolanda, his former lover and Gerardo, the detective who sought to bring him to justice. After running away from the authorities for two years, tired of being constantly harassed by the police and the bloody war between his cartel and his rivals, Centauro faked his death along with his second biological son. In this way he will be able to rebuild his empire without the persecution of the police and, moreover, will allow him to execute his plan of revenge towards Yolanda. Listening to the news of the alleged deaths, Yolanda and her daughter Cristina, as well as Gerardo and his adopted son, Gato, manage to return to Mexico from Canada, where they have lived under the Witness Protection Program. However, it will not be an easy return for Yolanda, since Centaurus will use all his sagacity and power to destroy her and her loved ones in their thirst for revenge.

== Episodes ==
Season	Episodes	Originally released	
Season	Episodes	First released	Last released
1	51	January 12, 2016	March 23, 2016
2	90	May 2, 2017	July 24, 2017

== Cast ==
=== Starring ===
- Humberto Zurita as Benedictino Suárez / El Centauro (seasons 1-2)
- Ludwika Paleta as Yolanda Acosta (seasons 1-2)
- Michel Brown as Gerardo Duarte (seasons 1-2)
- Alexandra de la Mora as Julia Peña (season 1)
- Irene Azuela as Tania Muñoz (season 1)
- Sandra Echeverría as Ana Velazco (season 2)

=== Also starring ===
- Andrea Martí as Bibiana Taborda (season 1)
- Ricardo Polanco as Rafael Bianchini (seasons 1-2)
- Enoc Leaño as Paulino Atencio / El Cirujano (season 1)
- Carmen Delgado as Dominga (season 1)
- Pablo Abitia as Vicente Garrido (seasons 1-2)
- Ignacio Guadalupe as Comisario Manuel Salgado (season 1)
- Carmen Madrid as Mariela Acosta (season 1)
- Héctor Holten as Otoniel Morillo (season 1)
- Michel Chauvet as Emilio Cobos
- Arantza Ruiz as Cristina Acosta (seasons 1-2)
- Blanco Tapia as Marco Aguilar (season 1)
- Cuauhtli Jiménez as Ignacio "Nacho" Atencio (season 1)
- Andrés Montiel as Félix Ávila (season 1)
- Jaime del Aguila as Luis "Lucho" (seasons 1-2)
- Iñaki Godoy as El Gato (seasons 1-2)
- Vadhir Derbez as César Suárez (season 1)
- Mónica Dionne as Leticia Solís (season 2)
- Salvador Amaya as Isidro Gómez (season 2)
- Horacio García Rojas as Lalo López (season 2)
- Tizoc Arroyo as Javier (seasons 1-2)
- Alejandro Caso as Julián Lemus (season 2)
- Óscar Toledano as Nicolás Bayón (season 2)
- Raúl Villegas as Miguel Fernández (season 2)
- José Ramón Berganza as Román Luna (season 2)

=== Recurring ===
- José Sedek as Diego (season 1)
- Evelin Cedeño as Mariana Tapia (season 2)
- Albi De Abreu as El Loco (season 2)
- Roberto Tello as Liborio Fernández (season 2)
- Francisco Calvillo as El Dueñas (season 2)
- Jack Duarte as Alex (season 2)

== Ratings ==
Viewership and ratings per season of La querida del Centauro
Season	Timeslot (ET)	Episodes	First aired		Last aired		Avg. viewers (millions)	18–49 rank
Season	Timeslot (ET)	Episodes	Date	Viewers (millions)	Date	Viewers (millions)	Avg. viewers (millions)	18–49 rank
1	Mon–Fri 10pm/9c	51	January 12, 2016	1.85	March 13, 2016	1.14	2.05	TBD
2	Mon–Fri 10pm/9c	90	May 2, 2017	1.14	July 24, 2017	1.46	TBD	TBD

== Awards and nominations ==
Year	Award	Category	Nominated works	Result
Season 1
2016	Your World Awards	Favorite Lead Actor: Series	Humberto Zurita	Nominated
2016	Your World Awards	Favorite Lead Actor: Series	Michel Brown	Nominated
2016	Your World Awards	Favorite Lead Actress: Series	Ludwika Paleta	Nominated
2016	Your World Awards	The Best Bad Girl: Series	Carmen Madrid	Nominated
2016	Your World Awards	The Best Bad Girl: Series	Alexandra de la Mora	Nominated
2016	Your World Awards	Favorite Actress: Series	Andrea Martí	Nominated
2016	Your World Awards	Favorite Actor: Series	Ricardo Polanco	Nominated
2016	Your World Awards	The Perfect Couple	Ludwika Paleta and Michel Brown	Nominated
2016	Your World Awards	Revelation of the Year	Arantza Ruiz	Nominated
2016	Your World Awards	Súper series of the Year	La querida del Centauro	Nominated
Season 2
2017	Your World Awards	Favorite Series	La querida del Centauro	Nominated
2017	Your World Awards	Favorite Lead Actor	Michel Brown	Nominated
2017	Your World Awards	Favorite Lead Actress	Ludwika Paleta	Nominated
2017	Your World Awards	The Best Bad Boy	Humberto Zurita	Nominated
