= List of La querida del Centauro episodes =

La querida del Centauro, is a Spanish-language telenovela produced by Teleset and Sony Pictures Television for Telemundo.

== Series overview ==
Season	Episodes	Originally released	
Season	Episodes	First released	Last released
1	51	January 12, 2016	March 23, 2016
2	90	May 2, 2017	July 24, 2017

== Episode list ==
=== Season 1 (2016) ===
No. overall	No. in season	Title	Original release date	US viewers (millions)
1	1	"Yolanda cae en la peor cárcel de todas"	January 12, 2016	1.85
2	2	"El Centauro le brinda protección a Yolanda"	January 13, 2016	N/A
3	3	"Yolanda rechaza acostarse con El Centauro"	January 14, 2016	N/A
4	4	"Yolanda se reencuentra con su hija Cristina"	January 15, 2016	N/A
5	5	"Yolanda y El Centauro hacen el amor"	January 18, 2016	1.49
6	6	"Julia quiere muerta a La Querida"	January 19, 2016	1.66
7	7	"El Centauro acepta escapar con Yolanda"	January 20, 2016	N/A
8	8	"Gerardo sufre por el secuestro de su esposa Bibiana"	January 21, 2016	N/A
9	9	"El Centauro escapa solo"	January 22, 2016	N/A
10	10	"Gerardo rescata a Bibiana"	January 25, 2016	N/A
11	11	"El Centauro le escribe a Yolanda"	January 26, 2016	N/A
12	12	"Intentan violar a Yolanda"	January 27, 2016	N/A
13	13	"Yolanda sale libre y se reúne con Cristina"	January 28, 2016	N/A
14	14	"Gerardo autoriza desconectar a Bibiana"	January 29, 2016	N/A
15	15	"El Centauro contacta a Yolanda"	February 1, 2016	N/A
16	16	"Yolanda y El Centauro se encuentran"	February 2, 2016	N/A
17	17	"Gerardo besa a Yolanda"	February 3, 2016	1.46
18	18	"El Centauro planea rescatar a Yolanda"	February 4, 2016	N/A
19	19	"Yolanda se prepara para huír"	February 5, 2016	N/A
20	20	"Gerardo es atrapado por los hombres del Centauro"	February 8, 2016	1.44
21	21	"Yolanda mata por Gerardo"	February 9, 2016	N/A
22	22	"Julia le advierte a Yolanda no meterse con El Centauro"	February 10, 2016	N/A
23	23	"El Centauro amenaza a Yolanda"	February 11, 2016	N/A
24	24	"El Centauro le roba al Cirujano"	February 12, 2016	N/A
25	25	"César secuestra a Tania y se la lleva a Julia"	February 15, 2016	N/A
26	26	"Yolanda le dice a Cristina que planea escapar"	February 16, 2016	N/A
27	27	"El Centauro ordena golpear a Vicente"	February 17, 2016	N/A
28	28	"Julia le revela a Tania que Vicente le sacó el ojo"	February 18, 2016	N/A
29	29	"Yolanda se enfrenta a golpes con Lola"	February 19, 2016	N/A
30	30	"Yolanda pide ver a Cristina"	February 22, 2016	N/A
31	31	"Yolanda y Gerardo hacen el amor"	February 23, 2016	N/A
32	32	"César intenta violar a Cristina"	February 24, 2016	N/A
33	33	"Cristina busca suicidarse"	February 26, 2016	N/A
34	34	"El Centauro planea aliarse con Emilio"	February 29, 2016	N/A
35	35	"Gerardo aguanta compartir a Yolanda con El Centauro"	March 1, 2016	N/A
36	36	"El Centauro y Emilio planean acabar con El Cirujano"	March 2, 2016	N/A
37	37	"Gerardo se infiltra en el gimnasio"	March 3, 2016	N/A
38	38	"Yolanda le gana la pelea a Lola"	March 4, 2016	N/A
39	39	"El Centauro recupera su pistola de oro"	March 7, 2016	1.43
40	40	"El Centauro mata al Cirujano"	March 8, 2016	N/A
41	41	"Yolanda y Gerardo planean rescatar a Cristina"	March 9, 2016	N/A
42	42	"Emilio quiere a Yolanda como representante"	March 10, 2016	N/A
43	43	"Julia y César le siguen la pista a Yolanda"	March 11, 2016	N/A
44	44	"Yolanda quiere infiltrar a Gerardo en el gimnasio"	March 14, 2016	N/A
45	45	"Julia descubre que Yolanda le mintió"	March 15, 2016	N/A
46	46	"Gerardo le propone matrimonio a Yolanda"	March 16, 2016	N/A
47	47	"Julia ordena secuestrar a Yolanda"	March 17, 2016	N/A
48	48	"El Centauro elimina a Julia"	March 18, 2016	N/A
49	49	"Salgado se sorprende al ver vivo a Gerardo"	March 21, 2016	N/A
50	50	"El Centauro atrapa a Gerardo"	March 22, 2016	N/A
51	51	"Emilio rescata al Centauro"	March 23, 2016	1.14

=== Season 2 (2017) ===
No. overall	No. in season	Title	Original release date	US viewers (millions)
52	1	"Yolanda cae en la trampa"	May 2, 2017	1.14
53	2	"Mensaje de amenaza"	May 3, 2017	1.01
54	3	"Revelación"	May 4, 2017	0.93
55	4	"De incógnito"	May 5, 2017	0.87
56	5	"La ficha de El Centauro"	May 8, 2017	0.85
57	6	"Tercera advertencia"	May 8, 2017	1.01
58	7	"El Centauro mueve sus hilos"	May 9, 2017	0.83
59	8	"¿Suicidio?"	May 9, 2017	0.87
60	9	"Juego de amnesia"	May 10, 2017	0.81
61	10	"Espía al descubierto"	May 10, 2017	0.93
62	11	"Siembra la duda"	May 11, 2017	0.77
63	12	"Espionaje en marcha"	May 11, 2017	0.85
64	13	"¿Yolanda al mando?"	May 12, 2017	0.58
65	14	"Jefa de Cártel"	May 12, 2017	0.77
66	15	"¡Fuera del Camino!"	May 15, 2017	0.87
67	16	"Yolanda se revela"	May 15, 2017	0.95
68	17	"Armada hasta los dientes"	May 16, 2017	0.96
69	18	"Operación rescate"	May 16, 2017	1.06
70	19	"El Centauro en Jaque"	May 17, 2017	0.93
71	20	"Doloroso destino"	May 17, 2017	1.02
72	21	"Rompecabezas"	May 18, 2017	0.95
73	22	"Chip para Yolanda"	May 18, 2017	0.95
74	23	"Coqueteos"	May 19, 2017	0.79
75	24	"Yolanda y su sexto sentido"	May 19, 2017	0.83
76	25	"Confabulación"	May 22, 2017	0.90
77	26	"Investigaciones peligrosas"	May 22, 2017	0.93
78	27	"Leticia horrorizada"	May 23, 2017	0.81
79	28	"Mala memoria"	May 23, 2017	0.94
80	29	"Balacera en la red"	May 24, 2017	0.83
81	30	"El Centauro acorrala a Nicolás"	May 24, 2017	0.91
82	31	"Borrar rastros"	May 25, 2017	0.89
83	32	"Pista certera"	May 25, 2017	0.92
84	33	"Nicolás conoce a su verdugo"	May 26, 2017	0.85
85	34	"¿Unidos para siempre?"	May 26, 2017	0.94
86	35	"Esposo plantado"	May 29, 2017	0.97
87	36	"El plan de Emilio"	May 29, 2017	0.91
88	37	"Lemus bajo la lupa"	May 30, 2017	0.96
89	38	"Lemus no cede a la presión"	May 30, 2017	1.04
90	39	"Recuerdos fuera de control"	May 31, 2017	1.06
91	40	"Román conoce a “La Jefa”"	May 31, 2017	1.05
92	41	"Leticia se arriesga"	June 1, 2017	0.93
93	42	"No hay donde huir"	June 1, 2017	1.02
94	43	"Paredes que oyen"	June 2, 2017	0.77
95	44	"Traiciona su placa"	June 2, 2017	0.81
96	45	"Próximo en la línea"	June 5, 2017	0.83
97	46	"Camaleónica"	June 5, 2017	0.95
98	47	"Encajan las fichas de Yolanda"	June 6, 2017	0.94
99	48	"Yolanda la de antes"	June 6, 2017	0.98
100	49	"Fingiendo ser la Jefa"	June 7, 2017	0.92
101	50	"Torturado"	June 7, 2017	0.88
102	51	"Yolanda traiciona nuevamente"	June 8, 2017	0.99
103	52	"Juntos de nuevo"	June 8, 2017	1.08
104	53	"Detrás de la máscara"	June 9, 2017	0.81
105	54	"El desahogo de Ana"	June 9, 2017	0.94
106	55	"Amor silenciado"	June 12, 2017	0.98
107	56	"La confusión de Gerardo"	June 12, 2017	1.08
108	57	"Cuñado venenoso"	June 13, 2017	0.94
109	58	"La otra cara de Mariana"	June 13, 2017	0.95
110	59	"Verdad dolorosa"	June 14, 2017	1.03
111	60	"La frustración del Centauro"	June 14, 2017	1.09
112	61	"Los secretos del Comisionado"	June 15, 2017	1.01
113	62	"Ambición sin escrúpulos"	June 15, 2017	1.09
114	63	"Cae un pez gordo"	June 16, 2017	1.04
115	64	"Emboscada en el cementerio"	June 16, 2017	1.17
116	65	"Noticia bomba"	June 19, 2017	1.14
117	66	"La cruel venganza de Tyson"	June 19, 2017	1.13
118	67	"Benévolo"	June 21, 2017	1.24
119	68	"Padre e hijo: divergentes"	June 22, 2017	1.38
120	69	"El Centauro usa los medios"	June 23, 2017	1.06
121	70	"Terapia de impacto"	June 26, 2017	1.19
122	71	"Señales de vida"	June 27, 2017	1.19
123	72	"Intrigas"	June 28, 2017	1.28
124	73	"Mente asesina"	June 29, 2017	1.17
125	74	"Ana, lista para matar"	June 30, 2017	0.98
126	75	"Sufrimiento silencioso"	July 3, 2017	1.06
127	76	"A espaldas de El Centauro"	July 4, 2017	0.83
128	77	"Escurridizos"	July 5, 2017	1.18
129	78	"Vigilancia de narcos"	July 6, 2017	1.13
130	79	"Los tentáculos del Centauro"	July 7, 2017	0.99
131	80	"La valentía de Paula"	July 10, 2017	1.06
132	81	"El video de Gerardo"	July 11, 2017	1.03
133	82	"Polémica en los medios"	July 12, 2017	1.27
134	83	"Una mujer despechada"	July 13, 2017	1.13
135	84	"Alianza entre enemigos"	July 14, 2017	1.09
136	85	"En manos de Javier"	July 17, 2017	1.14
137	86	"Alianzas perdidas o ganadas"	July 18, 2017	1.24
138	87	"El secreto de Ana y Emilio"	July 19, 2017	1.19
139	88	"Ana juega con fuego"	July 20, 2017	1.28
140	89	"Operativo en marcha"	July 21, 2017	1.18
141	90	"La Querida elige su destino"	July 24, 2017	1.46
