= The White Slave (TV series) =

Colombian telenovela

- Genre: Telenovela
- Written by: Juliana Barrera; Andrés Burgos; Said Chamie; Eduardo Galdo; María Helena Porta; Clauda Sánchez
- Directed by: Liliana Bocanegra; Mateo Stivelberg
- Starring: See list
- Country of origin: Colombia
- Original language: Spanish
- No. of episodes: 61

Production
- Executive producer: Juliana Barrera
- Producers: Ana María Pérez Martínez; Mauricio Ruiz
- Production location: Santa Marta
- Cinematography: Carlos Arango; Andrés Gutiérrez; Alfredo Ruiz
- Editor: Fabián Rodríguez

Original release
- Network: Caracol Televisión
- Release: January 26 – April 25, 2016

The White Slave (Spanish: La esclava blanca) is a Colombian telenovela created by Eduardo Galdo and María Helena Porta for Caracol Televisión. The series originally aired from January 26, 2016, to April 25, 2016. The series stars Nerea Camacho as Victoria Quintero, Orián Suárez as Miguel Parreño and Miguel de Miguel as Nicolás Parreño.

== Plot ==
In 1821, Victoria Quintero is born the daughter of Don Domingo Quintero, a Colombian slaveholder and owner of the El Edén estate, and his wife Elena. Within weeks, her parents die in a fire started deliberately by a neighboring landowner and merchant, Nicolás Parreño, who wants the Quinteros' land and slaves. Victoria is saved by her black nurse, Lorenza, and her husband, Tomás. With their daughters Milagros and Rosita, Victoria is taken to a palenque deep in the jungle, where for twelve years she grows up as a maroon, believing this to be her family.

Victoria has a friend in the palenque, Miguel, the illegitimate son of Sara, a runaway slave, and Parreño. In 1833, together they visit the town of Santa Marta, but they are followed back to the palenque by soldiers who believe Victoria, a white girl, has been kidnapped. Parreño then hears about the supposedly kidnapped girl, guesses she is the missing Victoria, and orders his foreman Enrique Morales to kill her. In a raid on the palenque, many of the maroons, including Lorenza, are killed, and the survivors are captured and returned to slavery. Tomás, his daughters, and Miguel all now become the slaves of Parreño.

Victoria escapes the attack and seeks refuge in the village church, whose priest, Father Octavio, sends her away to join a convent in Spain, where she is taught to read, write, and serves as a novice for the next ten years. In 1843, the now 22 year old Victoria escapes from the convent, with the help of her best friend, Remedios. She then returns to Santa Marta posing as Lucía de Bracamonte, a Spanish aristocrat who has entered into an agreement to marry Parreño. Victoria's plan is simply to find Miguel and his family and take them away, but in Santa Marta she is told the story of her parents' death and decides to stay on and destroy Parreño.

== Cast ==
- Nerea Camacho as Victoria Quintero
- Orián Suárez as Miguel Parreño
- Miguel de Miguel as Nicolás Parreño, Main villain
- Norma Martínez as Adela Parreño, Villain
- Ricardo Vesga as Enrique Morales, Villain
- Modesto Lacen as Tomás
- Viña Machado as Eugenia Upton
- Andrés Suárez as Capitán Francisco Granados, Villain
- Natasha Klauss as Ana Granados
- Miroslava Morales as Lorenza Aragón Yepes
- Ana Mosquera as Milagros
- Jose Luis Garcia Campos as Comandante Padilla
- Mauro Donetti as General Fidel Márquez
- Luciano D'Alessandro as Alonso Márquez
- Andrés Parra as Gabriel Márquez
- Camilo Sáenz as Joaquín Márquez
- Paola Moreno as Remedios
- Cristina García as Isabel "Isabelita" Parreño
- Alejandra Taborda as Rosa "Rosita"
- Sara Pinzón as young Victoria Quintero
- Alfonso Polanco as young Miguel Parreño
- Carrel Lasso as Trinidad
- Teo Sierra as Alberto
- Jefferson Quiñones as Rubén
- Leonardo Acosta as Dr. Arturo López, Villain
- Juan Jiménez as Jaime López, Villain
- Karoll Márquez as Jesús Pimentel
- Mauricio Figueroa as Pedro Caicedo "Pardo"
- Nadia Rowinsky as Lupe
- Andrea Gómez as Catalina Restrepo
- Roberto Cano as Felipe Restrepo
- Juan José Franco as Padre Octavio Bocanegra
- Carlos Duplat as Abad Rangel
- Isabella García as young Isabel "Isabelita" Parreño
- Nina Caicedo as Sara
- Sofía Jaramillo as Hilda
- Héctor de Malba as Martín King
- Luis Fernando Patiño as Soldado García
- Sara Deray as Lucía de Bracamonte

== Episodes ==
No.	Title	Original release date	Colombia viewers (millions)
1	"Un incendio acaba con los padres de Victoria y su destino estará en manos de esclavos"	January 26, 2016	11.1
2	"La vida de Victoria corre peligro tras escaparse del palenque"	January 27, 2016	10.8
3	"El palenque es descubierto por culpa de Victoria y se desata una reñida guerra"	January 28, 2016	11.1
4	"Victoria es obligada a trasladarse a un convento en España"	January 29, 2016	10.4
5	"Decisión tomada, Victoria volverá a Santa Marta"	February 1, 2016	11.3
6	"Se saldrá con la suya, Victoria encontrará la manera de abandonar el convento"	February 2, 2016	10.8
7	"Como una marquesa, Victoria llega a Santa Marta a comprometerse con su peor enemigo"	February 3, 2016	9.8
8	"Victoria se escapó de sus raptores y fue encontrada de la peor manera"	February 4, 2016	10.2
9	"Después de años de sufrimiento Miguel y Victoria vuelven a estar frente a frente"	February 5, 2016	9.5
10	"Victoria estuvo a punto de descubrir a Nicolás y Eugenia en pleno romance"	February 8, 2016	9.7
11	"Por fin, Victoria le revelará a Miguel su verdadera identidad"	February 9, 2016	10.3
12	"De la manera más vil, Rosita fue asesinada por orden de Nicolás"	February 10, 2016	10.9
13	"Justos pagan por pecadores y la muerte de Rosita se la adjudicaron a Miguel"	February 11, 2016	11.5
14	"Victoria revela su identidad y se confiesa al frente de su familia"	February 12, 2016	10.3
15	"En su escape Isabelita encontró nuevos amigos mientras su padre sufre por ella"	February 15, 2016	10.5
16	"Se hizo justicia, Miguel recibió una buena noticia para su vida"	February 16, 2016	10.3
17	"Miguel se encuentra frente a frente con el asesino de Rosita"	February 17, 2016	10.6
18	"Victoria está cegada, ahora quiere casarse a como dé lugar con Nicolás"	February 18, 2016	9.6
19	"La venganza inició, Victoria se casó con Nicolás y los problemas no dieron espera"	February 19, 2016	10.0
20	"Remedios se entera que Victoria causó su accidente y no quiere volver a verla"	February 22, 2016	10.2
21	"Miguel regresa a Santa Marta pero ve a Victoria casada y feliz con Nicolás"	February 23, 2016	11.1
22	"Miguel se reencuentra con Victoria pero no la perdona por casarse con su padre"	February 24, 2016	10.1
23	"Morales es despedido de la hacienda y ahora buscará venganza"	February 25, 2016	10.6
24	"Entre la espada y la pared, Morales está cada vez más cerca de revelar qué ocurrió en el incendio"	February 26, 2016	9.5
25	"Miguel demuestra que Nicolás nunca lo mató y demanda al asesino de Rosita"	February 29, 2016	10.2
26	"Victoria le revela su verdadera identidad al padre Octavio"	March 1, 2016	10.5
27	"Se hizo justicia, Jaime fue a la cárcel y Miguel quedó en libertad"	March 2, 2016	10.2
28	"Nicolás no tiene compasión con nadie, Arturo López es su próxima víctima mortal"	March 3, 2016	9.9
29	"No le bastó con matar a su padre, Nicolás también asesina a Jaime López"	March 4, 2016	8.8
30	"Miguel es torturado por su propio padre y desata una sed de venganza"	March 7, 2016	10.0
31	"Injusto, La crueldad de Nicolás no tiene límites y encierra a Victoria"	March 8, 2016	9.6
32	"Victoria se escapa de su encierro para verse con Miguel"	March 9, 2016	10.3
33	"Victoria se cansó de los insultos Adela y con seria actitud la confrontó"	March 10, 2016	N/A
34	"Después de varios días de cautiverio, Miguel fue dejado en libertad"	March 11, 2016	N/A
35	"Catalina Restrepo es asesinada cuando intentaba huir de Santa Marta"	March 14, 2016	N/A
36	"Felipe no tendrá compasión con los asesinos de su hermana Catalina"	March 15, 2016	N/A
37	"Miguel idea un plan para que todos los esclavos sean libres"	March 16, 2016	N/A
38	"Se voltearon los papeles, Ahora los esclavos golpean y humillan a Granados"	March 17, 2016	N/A
39	"Victoria queda atrapada en el tunel y nadie da con su paradero"	March 18, 2016	N/A
40	"En un gesto heroico, Miguel rescató a Victoria del túnel, pero…"	March 22, 2016	N/A
41	"Por amor a Miguel, Victoria contrabandeará con la mercancía de Nicolás"	March 23, 2016	N/A
42	"Victoria se verá obligada a robar el cargamento de cacao de Nicolás"	March 28, 2016	N/A
43	"El plan de Victoria para robarle el cacao a Nicolás la pondrá en grave peligro"	March 30, 2016	N/A
44	"Isabelita es secuestrada y su vida correrá bastante peligro"	March 31, 2016	N/A
45	"¿Logrará reconocerla?, Victoria se encuentra frente a frente con su mamá Lorenza"	April 1, 2016	N/A
46	"Firmó su sentencia de odio, Adela le disparó a Victoria"	April 4, 2016	N/A
47	"Tomás arriesgará su vida con tal de abrirle camino al túnel"	April 5, 2016	N/A
48	"Los esclavos abrieron el túnel pero Julián los descubre saliendo de allí"	April 6, 2016	N/A
49	"Isabelita descubre a su papá Nicolás asesinando a Candela"	April 7, 2016	N/A
50	"Nicolás amordaza a Isabelita y la hace pasar por enferma"	April 8, 2016	N/A
51	"El diablo muere hoy en el Edén, Morales dispara contra Nicolás"	April 11, 2016	N/A
52	"Llena de venganza Victoria intenta matar a Nicolás"	April 12, 2016	N/A
53	"Llegó la hora para los esclavos y están a un paso de su libertad"	April 13, 2016	N/A
54	"La fuga de los esclavos no sale como esperaban y se desata una guerra"	April 14, 2016	N/A
55	"Tomás se culpa por la fuga y Nicolás le da un terrible castigo"	April 15, 2016	N/A
56	"Adela se entera de toda la verdad sobre la marquesa de Bracamonte"	April 18, 2016	N/A
57	"Nicolás se entera que Victoria lo engañó y no es la marquesa"	April 19, 2016	N/A
58	"Comienza la venganza, Nicolás quiere acabar poco a poco con Victoria"	April 20, 2016	N/A
59	"Una confesión de Tomás pondría en riesgo la vida de Miguel"	April 21, 2016	N/A
60	"Victoria descubre que Nicolás mató a Sor Alicia y la marquesa"	April 22, 2016	N/A
61	"Victoria gana la batalla y Nicolás recibe un merecido castigo"	April 25, 2016	N/A

== Awards and nominations ==
Year	Award	Category	Nominated works	Result
2016	Premios Tu Mundo	Novela of the Year	La esclava blanca	Nominated
2016	Premios Tu Mundo	Favorite Lead Actress	Nerea Camacho	Nominated
2016	Premios Tu Mundo	Best Supporting Actress	Norma Martínez	Nominated
2016	Premios Tu Mundo	Best Supporting Actor	Miguel de Miguel	Nominated
2016	Premios Tu Mundo	Favorite Actress	Ana Harlen Mosquera	Nominated
2016	Premios Tu Mundo	Favorite Actor	Orian Suárez	Nominated
2016	Premios Tu Mundo	The Perfect Couple	Nerea Camacho and Orián Suárez	Nominated
