= Miguel de Miguel =

Spanish actor

- Born: Miguel de Miguel Carrasco; 17 April 1975 (age 50); Nerja, Spain
- Occupation: Actor
- Years active: 2002–present
- Height: 191 cm (6 ft 3 in)
- Spouse(s): Eva Pedraza (m. 2011)
- Children: 1

Miguel de Miguel (born Miguel de Miguel Carrasco, 17 April 1975 in Nerja, Spain), is a Spanish actor.

== Filmography ==
=== Films ===
Year	Title	Role	Notes
2011	El Libro	Raúl	Short film
2015	El cuarto chakra	Unknown	Short film

=== Television ===
Year	Title	Role	Notes
2002	Hospital Central	Paciente	Episode: "El túnel"
2003	Código fuego	Unknown	Episode: "Equilibrios"
2003	Un paso adelante	Unknown	Episode: "¿Qué está pasando?"
2004	La sopa boba	Raúl	9 episodes
2004	Los Serrano	Unknown	Episode: "El otro lado de la acera"
2004	Paco y Veva	Unknown	6 episodes
2005	Obsesión	Javier González Salmerón	20 episodes
2007–08	Arrayán	Yeray Acosta Santana	38 episodes
2008–09	Yo soy Bea	César Villa	159 episodes
2010	La que se avecina	Adrián	2 episodes
2011	La Reina del Sur	Teo Aljarafe	31 episodes
2011	Homicidios	Carlos García Aranda	8 episodes
2012	Made in Cartagena	Vicente Domínguez de Alba	
2013	Familia	Pedro	7 episodes
2015	¿Quién mató a Patricia Soler?	Sebastián Sinisterra	
2015	La esquina del diablo	Mayor Eder Martín	
2016	The White Slave	Nicolás Parreño	
2021	Malverde: El Santo Patrón	Lisandro Luna	Main role
