= Your World Awards for Novela of the Year =

Annual US media award

Premios Tu Mundo for Novela of the Year
- Awarded for: Novela of the Year
- Country: United States
- Presented by: Telemundo
- First award: 2012
- Currently held by: Novela: La Doña (2017); Súper series: El Señor de los Cielos (2017)

The Premios Tu Mundo for Novela of the Year, is a category created by Premios Tu Mundo, presented by Telemundo, In this category the best telenovela Telemundo is chosen. So far the only soap opera that has had 2 nominations has been El Señor de los Cielos.

== Winners and nominees ==
Key	Meaning
‡	Indicates the winning telenovela

Listed below are the winners of the award for each year, as well as the other nominees.

=== Novelas ===
Year	Telenovela	Ref
2012 (1st)	Mi corazón insiste en Lola Volcán ‡	
2012 (1st)	Una Maid en Manhattan	
2012 (1st)	La Reina del Sur	
2012 (1st)	La casa de al lado	
2012 (1st)	Corazón valiente	
2013 (2nd)	La Patrona ‡	
2013 (2nd)	Pablo Escobar, el patrón del mal	
2013 (2nd)	Rosa diamante	
2013 (2nd)	El Señor de los Cielos	
2013 (2nd)	Pasión prohibida	
2013 (2nd)	El rostro de la venganza	
2014 (3rd)	Santa Diabla ‡	
2014 (3rd)	En otra piel	
2014 (3rd)	Marido en alquiler	
2014 (3rd)	El Señor de los Cielos	
2015 (4th)	Tierra de reyes ‡	
2015 (4th)	Los miserables	
2015 (4th)	Reina de corazones	
2016 (5th)	Bajo el mismo cielo ‡	
2016 (5th)	Celia	
2016 (5th)	Eva la trailera	
2016 (5th)	La esclava blanca	

=== Súper series ===
Year	Serie	Ref
2015 (1st)	El Señor de los Cielos ‡	
2015 (1st)	Dueños del paraíso	
2015 (1st)	Señora Acero	
2016 (2nd)	El Señor de los Cielos ‡	
2016 (2nd)	La querida del Centauro	
2016 (2nd)	Señora Acero	
2017 (3rd)	El Señor de los Cielos ‡	
2017 (3rd)	El Chema	
2017 (3rd)	La querida del Centauro	
2017 (3rd)	Señora Acero	
