= Your World Awards for Favorite Lead Actress =

Annual US media award

- Awarded for: Favorite Lead Actress
- Country: United States
- Presented by: Telemundo
- First award: 2012
- Currently held by: Novela: Aracely Arámbula (2017); Súper series: Fernanda Castillo (2015–16)

The Your World Awards for Your Favorite Lead Actress, is a category created by Premios Tu Mundo, presented by Telemundo, to choose the best favorite actress of telenovelas. So far the only actress, who has won this award consecutively was Fernanda Castillo.

== Winners and nominees ==
=== Novelas ===
Winner	Nominated
1st Your World Awards
Maritza Rodríguez for La casa de al lado	Litzy for Una Maid en Manhattan; Adriana Fonseca for Corazón valiente; Catherine Siachoque for La casa de al lado; Kate del Castillo for La Reina del Sur
2nd Your World Awards
Aracely Arámbula for La Patrona	Carla Hernández for Rosa diamante; Mónica Spear for Pasión prohibida; Ximena Herrera for El Señor de los Cielos
3rd Your World Awards
Gaby Espino for Santa Diabla	Carmen Villalobos for El Señor de los Cielos; María Elisa Camargo for En otra piel; Kimberly Dos Ramos for Marido en alquiler
4th Your World Awards
Scarlet Gruber for Tierra de reyes	Ana Lorena Sánchez for Tierra de reyes; Kimberly Dos Ramos for Tierra de reyes; Paola Nunez for Reina de corazones; Aracely Arámbula for Los miserables
5th Your World Awards
Danna Paola for ¿Quién es quién?	Edith González for Eva la trailera; María Elisa Camargo for Bajo el mismo cielo; Nerea Camacho for The White Slave; Jeimy Osorio for Celia
6th Your World Awards
Aracely Arámbula for La Doña	Angélica Vale for La Fan; Carolina Gaitán for Sin senos sí hay paraíso; Carolina Miranda for Señora Acero; Catherine Siachoque for Sin senos sí hay paraíso; Fernanda Castillo for El Señor de los Cielos; Ludwika Paleta for La querida del Centauro; María León for Guerra de ídolos; Maritza Rodríguez for Silvana sin lana

=== Súper series (2015–16) ===
Winner	Nominated
4th Your World Awards
Fernanda Castillo for El Señor de los Cielos	Blanca Soto for Señora Acero; Kate del Castillo for Dueños del paraíso; Carmen Villalobos for El Señor de los Cielos
5th Your World Awards
Fernanda Castillo for El Señor de los Cielos	Carmen Aub for El Señor de los Cielos; Ludwika Paleta for La querida del Centauro; Maritza Rodríguez for El Señor de los Cielos
