= Michel Chauvet =

Mexican actor (born 1985)

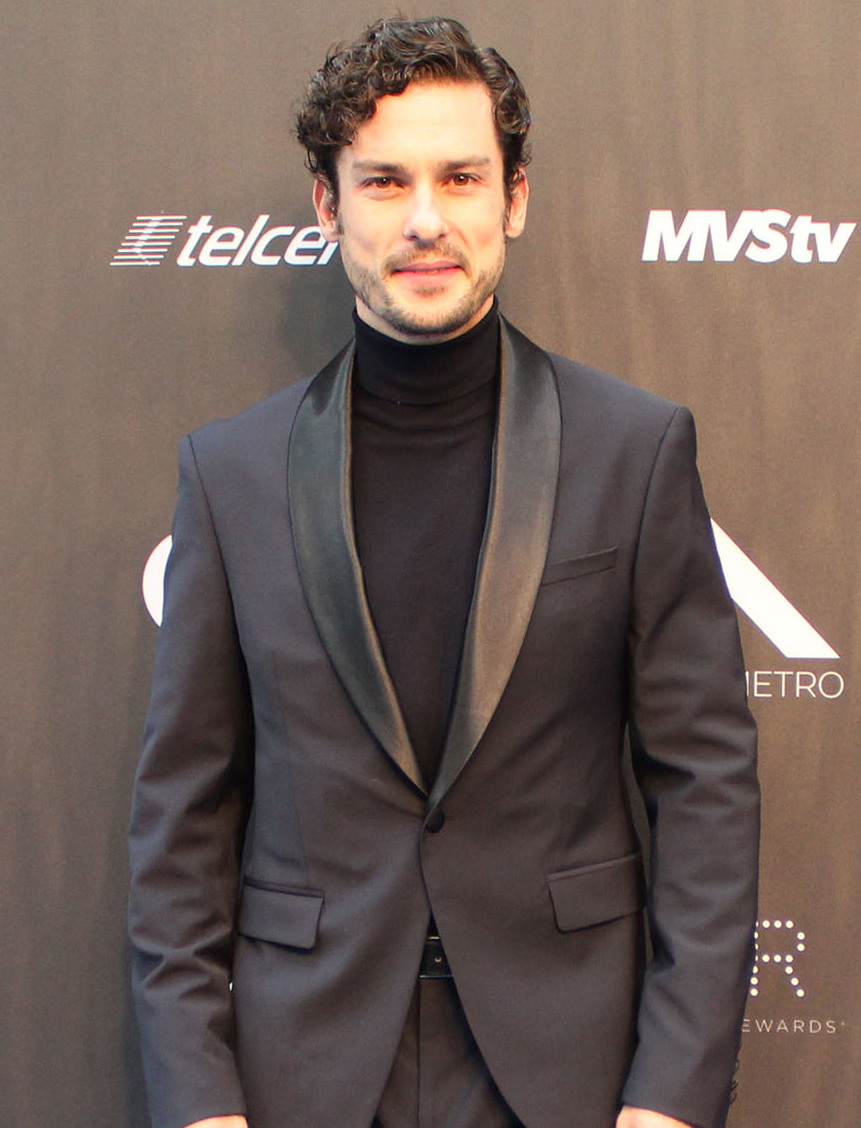
- Born: Michel Chauvet Loo; January 23, 1985; Mexico City, Mexico
- Occupation: Actor

Michel Chauvet Loo (born January 23, 1985) is a Mexican actor of television and films.

== Filmography ==
- Vous êtes de la région? (2004) - Un Paysan
- El hombre perfecto (2008) - Joaquin
- Sortilegio (2009) - Sergio
- Bienes raíces (2010)
- Cu4tro Paredes (2010)
- Paramedicos (2010) - Chavo de Novatada
- Archivo 253 (2015) - Diego
- Ménage à trois (2015) - Damián
- La querida del Centauro (2016) - Emilio Cobos
- Hasta que te conocí (2016) - Manuel Alvarado
- Enemigo (2016)
