= Titulares y Más =

- Also known as: Zona Mixta TYM (weekend editions, 2020–2025)
- Presented by: Vero Rodríguez
- Country of origin: United States

Production
- Running time: 30 minutes

Original release
- Network: Telemundo
- Release: March 31, 2005 – March 9, 2025

Titulares y Más is a Spanish-language late-night television talk and variety show aired by Telemundo. It is the number one sports and entertainment program on Spanish television and runs from Monday to Sunday. Presented by Vero Rodríguez weekends at 11 PM/10 CT or at the end of the local news on Telemundo.

== Overview ==
Titulares y Más debuted on Telemundo in 2005 and became the first viable Late Night offering by Telemundo Network and the first Late Night show of its kind on Spanish Language television.

From 2005 to 2013 it ran on Thursday and Friday nights at 11:35pm eastern/10:35pm Central, and 11:35pm Pacific until mid 2013 where it began airing every weeknights

In February 2020, the weekend edition was rebranded to Zona Mixta TYM. In February 2023, original host Karim Mendiburu announced his departure from the program. The final episode of Zona Mixta TYM aired on March 9, 2025. It was replaced by a new program titled El pelotazo.
