= Your World Awards =

American Television Award

Premios Tu Mundo
- Previous: 6th Your World Awards
- Awarded for: Recognition of Latinos in the media
- Country: United States
- Presented by: Telemundo
- First award: 2012
- Final award: 2017
- Website: Official website

The Premios Tu Mundo (Spanish for "Your World Awards") was an annual award presented by the American television network Telemundo. The awards celebrate the achievements of Hispanics and Latinos in the media, including TV shows, movies, music, fashion, and sports. The awards were established in 2012. Telemundo announced that there would not be a ceremony in 2018, but that the seventh edition would be held in 2019.

== Ceremonies ==
Ceremony	Date	Host(s)	Venue
1st Your World Awards	August 30, 2012	Gaby Espino, Rafael Amaya	American Airlines Arena
2nd Your World Awards	August 15, 2013	Gaby Espino, Aarón Díaz	American Airlines Arena
3rd Your World Awards	August 21, 2014	Gaby Espino, Aarón Díaz	American Airlines Arena
4th Your World Awards	August 20, 2015	Angélica Vale, Raúl González	American Airlines Arena
5th Your World Awards	August 25, 2016	Maritza Rodríguez, Carlos Ponce	American Airlines Arena
6th Your World Awards	August 24, 2017	Carmen Villalobos, Daniel Sarcos, Fernanda Castillo	American Airlines Arena

== Awards ==
=== Current awards ===
Category	Year
Novela of the Year	2012–2017
Súper Serie of the Year	2015–2017
Favorite Lead Actress	2012–2017
Favorite Lead Actor	2012–2017
Favorite Actress	2012–2017
Favorite Actor	2012–2017
Best Bad Girl	2012–2017
Best Bad Boy	2012–2017
Perfect Couple	2012–2017
Party Starter Song	2012–2017
Soy Sexy and I Know It	2012–2017
Favorite Pop Artist	2014–2017
Favorite Tropical Artist	2014–2017
Favorite Urban Artist	2014–2017
Fan Club of the Year	2014–2017
Favorite Actor with Bad Luck	2015–2017
Favorite Regional Mexican Artist	2015–2017
Favorite Influencer	2015–2017
Favorite Presenter	2017
Favorite Program	2017

=== Discontinued awards ===
Category	Year
Best Young Performance	2012
Favorite Novela Soundtrack	2012
Best Kiss	2012
Song That Steals My Heart	2012
Favorite Film	2012
Favorite Supermodel	2012
Most Charismatic Athlete	2012
That's Crazy!	2012
Best Music Video	2012–2013
Favorite Latino in Hollywood	2012–2013
Favorite Viral Video	2012–2013
Most Social	2012–2013
Sports Sensation of the Year	2012–2013
Best Bad Luck Moment	2012–2014
Most Popular Song of the Year	2013–2014
Best Moment of Reality	2013–2014
Best First Actress	2013–2015
Best First Actor	2013–2015
Favorite Young Artist	2014
Favorite Band	2014
Favorite Duo or Group	2014
Favorite Norteño Artist	2014
¡Qué Papacito!	2014
Social Sensation	2014
Favorite Sports Moment	2014–2015
Favorite Lead Actress of Súper Serie	2015–2016
Favorite Lead Actor of Súper Serie	2015–2016
Favorite Actress of Súper Serie	2015–2016
Favorite Actor of Súper Serie	2015–2016
Best Bad Girl of Súper Serie	2015–2016
Best Bad Boy of Súper Serie	2015–2016
Perfect Couple of Súper Serie	2015–2016
Favorite Entertainment Presenter	2015–2016
Favorite Specials Presenter	2015–2016
Revelation of the Year	2016
Favorite Weekday Program	2016
Favorite Weekend Program	2016
