= Alexandra de la Mora =

Mexican actress (born 1979)

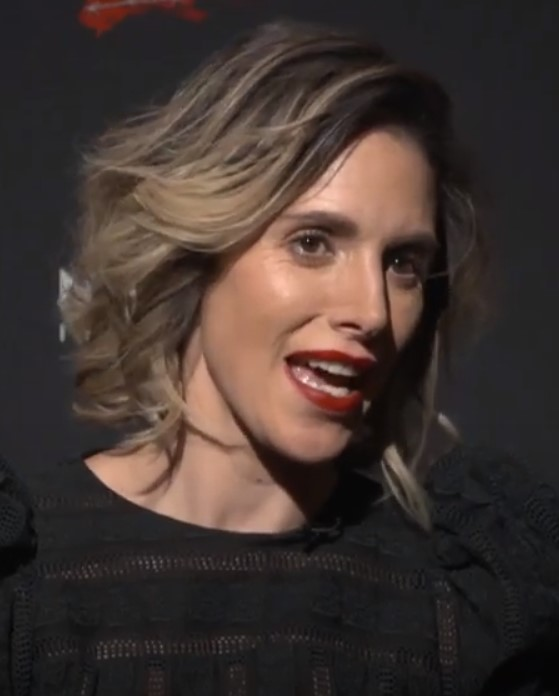
- de la Mora in 2018
- Born: May 12, 1979 (age 46); Monterrey, Nuevo León, Mexico
- Occupation: Actress
- Years active: 2002–present

Alexandra de la Mora (born May 12, 1979) is a Mexican actress.

== Filmography ==
=== Film roles ===
Year	Title	Role	Notes
2007	En blanco	Lucía	Short film
2008	3:19	Luciana	Short film
2008	La luz de la oscuridad	Ana María	
2009	2033	Svetlana	
2011	Dinamita	Cocinera Mala	
2011	La última muerte	Ray	
2011	Volver a partir	Vanessa	
2014	Dos	Laura	Short film

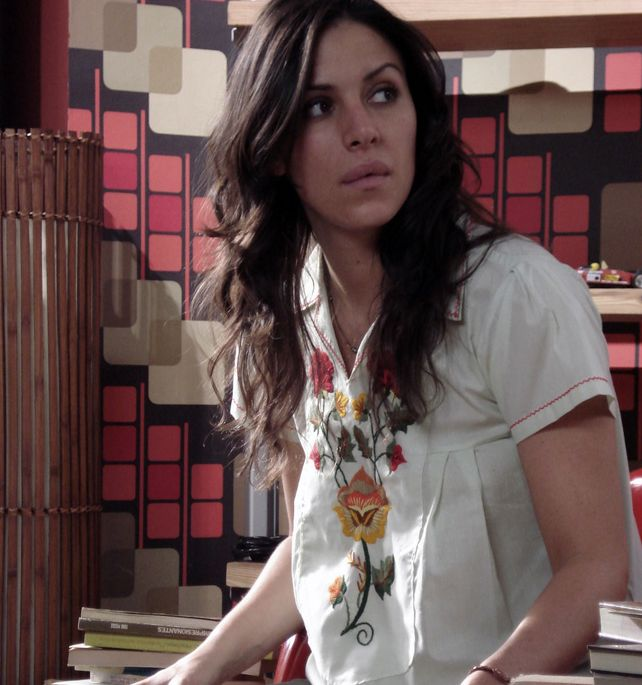
de la Mora in 2006

=== Television roles ===
Year	Title	Role	Notes
2002	Daniela	Roger Gamboa Montijo / Renata Vogel	
2002	Lo que es el amor	Mónica	68 episodes
2008–2009	Mujeres asesinas	Prisionera / Nancy	2 episodes
2009	Los simuladores	Unknown role	2 episodes
2010	Las Aparicio	Carla / Carlos Rivera	
2010	Capadocia	Vanessa	Episode: "La sal de la tierra"
2011	Bienvenida realidad	Elvira Medel	
2013	La Patrona	Patricia Montemar	121 episodes
2013	Fortuna	Luciana Tuñon	
2013	Las trampas del deseo	Lucia Salazar	
2014–2015	Los miserables	Helena Durán	111 episodes
2016	La querida del Centauro	Julia Peña	42 episodes
2016–2017	El Chema	Inés Clark	62 episodes
2017	Sense8	Realtor	Episode: "Obligate Mutualisms"
