= Humberto Zurita =

Mexican actor

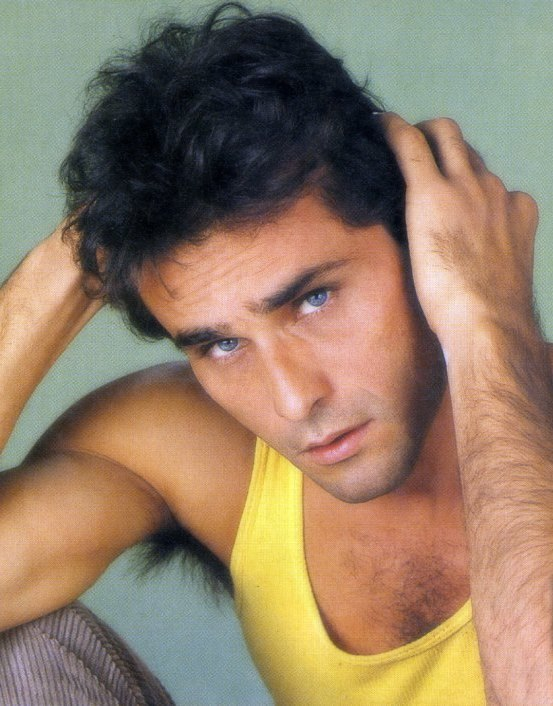
- Born: September 2, 1954 (age 72); Torreón, Coahuila, Mexico
- Occupations: Actor, film producer
- Years active: 1978–present
- Spouse: Christian Bach (m. 1986; died 2019)
- Partner: Stephanie Salas (2022-present)
- Children: Sebastián Zurita; Emiliano Zurita

Humberto Zurita Moreno (Spanish pronunciation: [umˈbeɾto suˈɾita], born September 2, 1954) is a Mexican actor, director and producer.

Zurita, one of 10 siblings from Torreón, Coahuila, is best known as actor, director and producer of telenovelas.

== Acting career ==
He made his first stage appearances in amateur performances of musicals including Tommy and Jesus Christ Superstar. He graduated from CUT (Centro Universitario de Teatro - the University Theatrical Centre) of UNAM (Universidad Nacional Autonoma - National Autonomous University of Mexico), the famous educational institute for acting in Mexico.

As a stage actor, he acted in various plays from classical to modern, as well as absurd theater. Humberto Zurita played classical roles like Hamlet but he also appeared in various contemporary plays like M. Butterfly. As theatrical producer and director he staged The Protagonist (El Protagonista) by the Argentine playwright Luis Agustoni (also acting in the title role as Fernando) and Haute surveillance (Severa Vigilancia) by Jean Genet.

In television, he started his acting career with Televisa in the late 1970s. He obtained his first starring role as Alberto Limonta in the 1981 production of El derecho de nacer. Two years later he took the role of Eddie in the Mexican production of P.S. Your Cat Is Dead, with Manuel Ojeda as Jimmy. He combined a film career with his television productions such as the telenovela Cañaveral de Pasiones.

In 1997, citing creative reasons he and his wife, Christian Bach, moved to TV Azteca. In a bold move he produced and starred in El candidato an interactive telenovela about current Mexican political issues a year prior to the 2000 Mexican presidential elections. He produced Azul Tequila (the only telenovela exported to the UK). In Mexico he has produced four films to date.

Since 2003, he has worked for Argos Television, an independent media company that has produced telenovelas for TV Azteca and Telemundo Network associated company.

== Filmography ==
=== Actor ===
List of acting credits in films
Year	Title	Role	Notes
1981	Rastro de muerte	Gerardo Valles	
1982	El día que murió Pedro Infante		
1983	Bajo la metralla	Pedro / Mateo	
1983	El amor es un juego extraño		
1984	Luna de miel y de sangre		
1985	Secuestro sangriento		
1985	Luna caliente	Ramiro Bernárdez	
1985	Maniqui		Short film
1986	De mujer a mujer	Sergio, El Guapo	
1986	El tres de copas		
1988	A la misma hora		
1988	La furia de un dios		
1988	Diana, René, y El Tíbiri		
1989	Los placeres ocultos		
1990	Cacería de un fugitivo		
1991	Nacidos para morir		
1991	Pelo suelto	Gustavo Álvarez Tello	
1991	Asalto	Andrés	
1992	Secuestro a mano armada		
1992	Muerte ciega	Luis	
1992	Imperio de los malditos	Guero	
1992	Persecución infernal		
1993	El asesino del zodiaco	García Rojas	
1994	Amor que mata		
1994	Perfume, efecto inmediato		
1995	Bésame En La Boca	Don Miguel, El Gerente de la Disquera	
1995	Morena	Carlos Narval	
2007	Operación piloto	Alejandro Trujillo	Television film
2007	Propiedad ajena	Coronel Robert Crossman	
2008	Bajo la sal	Comandante Trujillo	
2009	Euforia	Pat Corcoran	
2010	Ángel caído	Mr. cain	
2011	Travesía del desierto	Víctor	
2014	Canon, fidelidad al límite	Javier Betanzos	

List of acting credits in television
Year	Title	Role	Notes
1978	Una mujer	Javier	Television debut
1979	Muchacha de barrio	Raúl	
1980	Soledad	Fernando	
1980	Querer volar		
1981	El derecho de nacer	Alberto	
1983	El maleficio	Jorge de Martino	
1985	De pura sangre	Alberto	
1986	Hora marcada		Short film
1988	Encadenados	Germán	
1991	Al filo de la muerte	Dr. Francisco Riquer	
1993	Capricho	Daniel	
1993	Televiteatros		
1994	El vuelo del águila	General Porfirio Díaz	
1996	La antorcha encendida	Mariano Foncerrada	
1997	Alguna vez tendremos alas	Guillermo Lamas	
1999	El candidato	Ignacio Santoscoy	
2002	Agua y aceite	Ernesto	
2002	Ladrón de corazones	Antonio Vega	
2005	Los plateados	Emilio Gallardo	
2005	Volver al paraíso		
2006	Marina	Guillermo Alarcón Ferrer	
2008	Secretos del alma	Andrés Lascuráin Rivas	
2010–2012	Terra ribelle	Lupo	Main cast; 13 episodes
2011–2023	La Reina del Sur	Epifanio Vargas	Series regular
2013	Vivir a destiempo	Rogelio Bermúdez	
2015	El capitán Camacho	Capitán Carlos Camacho / Telésforo Camacho	
2016–2017	La querida del centauro	Benedictino Garcia "El Centauro"	
2020–2021	100 días para enamorarnos	Ramiro Rivera	
2025	Velvet: El nuevo imperio	Benjamín Márquez	Guest star
2026	La oficina	Jerónimo Ponce II	Episode: "Lávate las manos"

=== Producer ===
List of credits as a producer
Year	Title	Type
1993	Videoteatros: Véngan corriendo que les tengo un muerto	Television series
1993	Jezabel	Film
1993	Lil, la de los ojos color del tiempo	Television film
1993	La mujer legitima	Television film
1993	Televiteatros	Television series
1994	El abanico de Lady Windermere	Television film
1995	Bésame En La Boca	Film
1996	Cañaveral de Pasiones	Telenovela

== Awards and nominations ==
For Actor And Producer

Year	Category	Telenovela	Result
1983	Best Male Revelation	The right to be born	Nominated
1983	Best Breakthrough Actor of the 80's	The right to be born	Won
1984	Best Male Revelation	Under the shrapnel	Won
1984	Best Actor	Under the shrapnel	Won
1984	Best Antagonist Actor	The curse	Won
1984	Best Supporting Actor	The curse	Won
1985	Best Actor	The day Pedro Infante died	Won
1985	Best Male Co-Protagonist	The curse	Won
1986	Best Protagonist Actor	Of pure blood	Won
1989	Best Protagonist Actor	Notorious	Won
1989	Best Actor	The day Pedro Infante died	Nominated
1992	Best Protagonist Actor	At the edge of death	Won
1995	Best Protagonist Actor	The eagle flight	Won
1996	Best Production	Under the Same Skin	Won
1997	Best Telenovela	Canaveral of passions	Won
1998	Best Male International Figure Of The Year	Ever we have wings	Won
2008	Best Actor	Black bird	Won
2009	Best Actor	Under the Salt	Nominated
2011	Best Supporting Actor	The Queen of the South	Nominated
2012	Best Antagomist Actor in a Series	The Queen of the South	Nominated
2015	Best Male Co-Protagonist	Canon	Nominated
