= Ana Layevska =

Ukrainian-born Mexican actress and singer

Anna Layevska
- Born: January 10, 1982 (age 44); Kiev, Ukrainian SSR, Soviet Union
- Citizenship: Russia
- Occupations: Actress, singer
- Years active: 1997–present
- Spouse: Rodrigo Moreira (m. 2014)
- Partner: Rafael Amaya (2006-2010)
- Children: 2

Anna Serhiivna Layevska (Note: Also Anna Sergeyevna Layevskaya (Russian: Анна Сергеевна Лаевская)) (Ukrainian: Анна Сергіївна Лаєвська; born January 10, 1982), known as Ana Layevska, is a Ukrainian-Mexican actress and singer.

== Early life ==
Born in Kiev, Ukraine, Ana is the only child of violinist Serhii Laievskyi and actress Inna Rastsvetaeva. In 1987, Ana and her family moved from Kiev to Moscow, and in 1991 they moved to Mexico. She started playing the violin when she was five and started acting upon moving to Mexico.

== Career ==
In Mexico, she studied acting at the Centro de Educación Artística of Televisa. Thanks to her skills she obtained some roles in videoclips like "Carolina" by singer David and telenovelas such as Alguna vez tendremos alas (1997), Preciosa (1998) and Amor Gitano (1999), acting with Mauricio Islas and Mariana Seoane. Those were relatively small roles but they were good experiences as well.

Eventually, producer Pedro Damián called her to participate in telenovelas Primer amor... a mil por hora (2000), in which she shared credits with Anahí, Kuno Becker, Mauricio Islas and Valentino Lanús. She won the TVyNovelas Award for best female revelation, as well as the Palmas de Oro prize in the same category.

In 2001, she starred in her first film, In the Time of the Butterflies, where she had the opportunity of acting with Salma Hayek and Edward James Olmos. In 2005, she participated in the reality TV show Bailando Por Un Sueño, where celebrities are paired with contestants in a dance-based competition. Despite being unpopular with the judges, she was saved from eviction three times by public telephone voting, eventually placing third overall.

Her most recent appearance is in the hit telenovela El Fantasma de Elena as Elena Calcaño from Telemundo Studios. She played her second main villain role in Telemundo's Mi Corazón Insiste alongside Jencarlos Canela, Carmen Villalobos, and Angelica Maria.

In 2012, she played in Telemundo's Relaciones Peligrosas as Paty, a main role, alongside Sandra Echeverría, Maritza Bustamante and Gabriel Coronel.

In 2013, she starred in Telemundo's Dama y obrero, as Ignacia Santamaria, the lead protagonist, alongside José Luis Reséndez and Fabián Ríos.

In 2016 she returned to Televisa as Camila Borges the main antagonist of the series Sin rastro de ti, alongside Adriana Louvier and Danilo Carrera.

== Personal life ==
Other than acting, Layevska also sings and plays two instruments: violin and piano. When she was younger, she took classes in classical music.

She is fluent in Russian, Spanish and English.

Since 2014, Layevska has been married to businessman Rodrigo Moreira, with whom she has a daughter, Masha, and a son, Santiago.

== Filmography ==
Film roles
Year	Title	Roles	Notes
2004	Génesis 3:19	Lisa	Short film
2006	Cansada de besar sapos	Andrea / Andi	
2008	Casi divas	Ximena	
2009	The Fighter	Helen	
2009	Me importas tú, y tú	Unknown role	
2011	El firulete	Ana	Short film
2014	Cantinflas	Miroslava Stern	
2017	La leyenda del diamante	Helena	
2024	The Perfect Club		

== Television ==
Television roles
Year	Title	Roles	Notes
1997	Alguna vez tendremos alas	Violinist	Uncredited
1998	Preciosa	Bit Part	
1999	Cuento de Navidad	Unknown role	
1999	Amor gitano	María	
2000	Primer amor, a mil por hora	Marina Iturriaga Camargo	
2001	Primer amor, tres años después	Marina Iturriaga Camargo	Television film
2001	In the Time of the Butterflies	Lina Lovaton	Television film
2001–2002	El juego de la vida	Paulina De La Mora	
2002–2003	Mujer, casos de la vida real	Adela	3 episodes
2003	Clap, el lugar de tus sueños	Valentina	
2005	La Madrastra	Estrella San Román Fernández	
2006	Vecinos	Sara	Episode: "Rento mi departamento"
2006	Decisiones	Ana María Matute	Main cast
2006	Las dos caras de Ana	Ana Escudero / Marcia Lazcano	
2008	Querida enemiga	Lorena De la Cruz/Lorena Armendàriz Ruiz	Main role; 110 episodes
2009	Mujeres asesinas	Marcela Rodríguez	Episode: "Clara, fantasiosa"
2009	Verano de amor	Valeria	7 episodes
2009	Tiempo final	Pilar	Episode: "Cumpleaños"
2009	El que habita las alturas	Teresa	Television film
2010–2011	El fantasma de Elena	Elena Calcaño / Daniela Calcaño	
2011	Mi corazón insiste en Lola Volcán	Débora Noriega	Main role; 112 episodes
2011	Burn Notice	Irina	Episode: "Depth perception"
2012	Relaciones peligrosas	Patricia "Patty" Milano	Main role; 83 episodes
2013	Dama y obrero	Ignacia Santamaría	Main role; 80 episodes
2014	Isa	Dedal	Television film
2016	Sin rastro de ti	Camila Borges	Main Antagonist; 16 episodes
2016–2017	Blue Demon	Silvia	14 episodes
2017	Maldita tentación	Estefanía Braun	Main role
2017	Érase una vez	Cinthia	Episode: "El patito feo"
2017	Dopamine	Jessica	
2018	Y mañana será otro día	Margarita Gonzalez	
2019	Yankee	Laura Wolf	Main Role
2021	The War Next-door	Silvia Espinoza	Main role
2022	Mi secreto	Mariana Moncada de Ugarte	2 episodes
2023	Dra. Lucía, un don extraordinario	Mariana Esquivel	

== Awards and nominations ==
- 2015: The magazine People en Español named as one of "50 Most Beautiful".

Year	Award	Category	Title of Work	Result
2001	TVyNovelas Awards	Best Female Revelation	Primer Amor - A Mil por Hora	Won
2001	TVyNovelas Awards	Best Kiss	Primer Amor - A Mil por Hora	Won
2006	TVyNovelas Awards	Best Young Lead Actress	La Madrastra	Nominated
2007	TVyNovelas Awards	Best Lead Actress	Las Dos Caras de Ana	Nominated
2009	Premios ACE	Best Actress	Querida Enemiga	Nominated
2012	Premios Tu Mundo	The Best Bad Girl	Mi Corazón Insiste en Lola Volcán	Nominated
2012	Premios Tu Mundo	The Perfect Couple	Relaciones Peligrosas	Nominated
2012	Premios Tu Mundo	The Best Kiss	Relaciones Peligrosas	Nominated
2012	Premios People en Español	Best Supporting Actress	Relaciones Peligrosas	Nominated
2013	Miami Life Awards	Best Supporting Actress	Relaciones Peligrosas	Nominated
2013	Premios People en Español	Best Actress	Dama y Obrero	Nominated
