= La Bandida =

La Bandida may refer to:

- La Bandida (film), a 1962 Mexican film
- La Bandida (TV series), a Mexican telenovela
