= Reina de corazones (American TV series) =

American television series

- Genre: Telenovela
- Created by: Marcela Citterio
- Written by: Perla Farías; Juan Marcos Blanco; Marisa Milanesio; Claudia Morales
- Directed by: Claudio Callao; Nicolás DiBlasi
- Starring: Paola Núñez; Eugenio Siller; Juan Soler; Catherine Siachoque; Laura Flores
- Theme music composer: Descemer Bueno, Alexander Delgado, Enrique Iglesias and Randy Malcom Martinez
- Opening theme: "Bailando" by Enrique Iglesias feat. Gente de Zona and Descemer Bueno
- Country of origin: United States
- Original language: Spanish
- No. of episodes: 140

Production
- Executive producers: Joshua Mintz; Aurelio Valcárcel Carroll
- Producers: Aimée Godínez; David Posada
- Production locations: Las Vegas, United States
- Editor: Hader Antivar Duque
- Camera setup: Multi-camera

Original release
- Network: Telemundo
- Release: April 28 – November 7, 2014

Reina de corazones (English: Queen of Hearts) is an American telenovela produced by Joshua Mintz and Aurelio Valcárcel Carroll for Telemundo.

The series stars Paola Núñez as Reina, Eugenio Siller as Nicolás, Laura Flores as Sara, Juan Soler as Víctor and Catherine Siachoque as Estefanía.

== Overview ==
A story of a love that must overcome the barrier of memory, where glamorous nightlife and casinos play a prominent role in a plot characterized by mysterious twists and turns, espionage, conspiracy, intrigue, crime, and romance.

== Plot ==
Reina Ortíz (Paola Núñez) will suffer an accident that will cause her to forget the last eight years of her life, in which she became the wife of tycoon Víctor de Rosas (Juan Soler), Clara's (Nicole Apollonio) mother and the owner of the most famous bridal atelier in Las Vegas. She doesn't even remember the happiest moment of her life; when she fell in love with Nicolás Núñez (Eugenio Siller). Now Reina, who feels she doesn't belong to the world of luxury and power, will strive to discover her own truth.

Meanwhile, Nicolás, who is working for the secret service under a new identity as Javier Bolivar, is seeking revenge after Estefanía Pérez (Catherine Siachoque) made him believe Reina and Víctor were responsible for his unjust imprisonment.

== Cast ==
=== Main ===
- Paola Núñez as Reina Ortíz
- Eugenio Siller as Nicolás Núñez / Javier Bolivar de Rosas
- Juan Soler as Víctor de Rosas
- Catherine Siachoque as Estefanía Pérez de Hidalgo
- Laura Flores as Sara Smith / Virginia de la Vega

=== Recurring ===
- Gabriel Coronel as Frank Marino
- Henry Zakka as Octavio de Rosas / Gerónimo de Rosas
- Paulo Quevedo as Isidro Castillo
- Sergio Mur as Fernando San Juan / Patricio Picasso "El Supremo" / Gregorio Pérez
- Geraldine Galván as Greta de Rosas
- Pablo Azar as Juan José "Juanjo" García
- Wanda D'Isidoro as Susana Santillán
- María Luisa Flores as Constanza "Connie" Leiva
- Thali García as Camila de Rosas
- Rosalinda Rodríguez as Carmen Solís
- Paloma Márquez as Miriam Fuentes
- Raúl Arrieta as Andrés Hidalgo
- Sebastián Ferrat as Christian Palacios
- Ezequiel Montalt as Juan Balboa "Rocky"
- Priscila Perales as Delfina Ortíz
- Marisa Del Portillo as Asunción Gomez / Maruja Torres
- Guido Massri as Damian Hernández
- Nicole Apollonio as Clara de Rosas
- Emmanuel Pérez as Román Leiva

=== Guest stars ===
- Juan Pablo Gamboa as Mauro Montalbán
- Carlos Ferro as Lázaro Leiva
- Maritza Bustamante as Jacqueline "Jackie" Montoya
- Jessica Mas as Alicia Palacios "La Cobra"
- Juan Manuel Restrepo as José Paiscano

== Broadcast ==
The series originally aired from April 28 to November 7, 2014 in Mexico on Gala TV. The series aired on Telemundo from July 7 until December 1, 2014. It aired on Sony Channel Russia on 1 January 2016.

== Awards and nominations ==
Year	Award	Category	Recipient	Result
2014	People en Español	Best Actress	Paola Núñez	Nominated
2014	People en Español	Galanazo of the Year	Eugenio Siller	Nominated
2014	People en Español	Best on-screen chemistry	Paola Núñez and Eugenio Siller	Nominated
2014	People en Español	Best telenovela	Reina de corazones	Nominated
2014	People en Español	Best Female Antagonist	Catherine Siachoque	Won
2014	People en Español	Best Male Antagonist	Juan Soler	Nominated
2015	Miami Life Awards	Best Young Actor in a Telenovela	Pablo Azar	Nominated
2015	Miami Life Awards	Best Young Actor in a Telenovela	Gabriel Coronel	Won
2015	Miami Life Awards	Best Young Actor in a Telenovela	Guido Massri	Nominated
2015	Miami Life Awards	Best Young Actress in a Telenovela	Geraldine Galván	Nominated
2015	Miami Life Awards	Best Female Villain in a Telenovela	Catherine Siachoque	Nominated
2015	Miami Life Awards	Best Male Villain in a Telenovela	Juan Soler	Won
2015	Miami Life Awards	Best Male Villain in a Telenovela	Henry Zakka	Nominated
2015	Miami Life Awards	Best Supporting Actress in a Telenovela	Marisa del Portillo	Won
2015	Miami Life Awards	Best Supporting Actor in a Telenovela	Paulo Quevedo	Won
2015	Miami Life Awards	Best First Actress in a Telenovela	Laura Flores	Nominated
2015	Miami Life Awards	Best First Actor in a Telenovela	Henry Zakka	Won
2015	Miami Life Awards	Best Female Lead in a Telenovela	Paola Núñez	Won
2015	Miami Life Awards	Best Male Lead in a Telenovela	Eugenio Siller	Won
2015	Miami Life Awards	Best telenovela	Reina de corazones	Won
2015	Premios Tu Mundo	Novela of the Year	Reina de corazones	Nominated
2015	Premios Tu Mundo	Favorite Lead Actor	Eugenio Siller	Nominated
2015	Premios Tu Mundo	Favorite Lead Actress	Paola Núñez	Nominated
2015	Premios Tu Mundo	The Best Bad Boy	Juan Soler	Nominated
2015	Premios Tu Mundo	The Best Bad Girl	Catherine Siachoque	Nominated
2015	Premios Tu Mundo	Best Supporting Actress	María Luisa Flores	Nominated
2015	Premios Tu Mundo	Best Supporting Actor	Sergio Mur	Nominated
2015	Premios Tu Mundo	First Actress	Laura Flores	Nominated
2015	Premios Tu Mundo	First Actor	Henry Zakka	Nominated

== See also ==
- List of television shows set in Las Vegas
