= Eva la Trailera =

- Genre: Telenovela
- Created by: Valentina Párraga
- Screenplay by: Cristina Policastro; Yoyiana Ahumada; Felipe Espinet
- Directed by: Leonardo Galavis; Nicolás Di Blasi
- Starring: Edith González; Arap Bethke; Jorge Luis Pila; Erika de la Rosa
- Theme music composer: José Luis Arroyave; Bárbara Intriago
- Opening theme: "La Trailera" by Bárbara Intriago
- Country of origin: United States
- Original language: Spanish
- No. of episodes: 118

Production
- Executive producers: Martha Godoy; David Posada
- Producers: Rafael Villasmil; Jeanette Gómez; Jairo Arcila
- Cinematography: José Luis Velarde; Miguel Font
- Editor: Hader Antivar Duque
- Camera setup: Multi-camera
- Production company: Telemundo Studios

Original release
- Network: Telemundo
- Release: January 26 – July 15, 2016

Eva la Trailera is an American telenovela created by Valentina Párraga and produced by Martha Godoy for Telemundo.

The series stars Edith González as Eva, Arap Bethke as Pablo, Jorge Luis Pila as Armando and Erika de la Rosa as Marlene.

The telenovela is an original story written by Valentina Párraga and is not an adaptation of Lola the Truck Driver produced in 1983.

== Plot ==
Eva la Trailera tells the story of a strong, determined and impetuous woman who is more than ready to take on any challenge. But her life is disrupted by a series of cruel betrayals which require her to make decisions that lead to increasingly difficult roads. Her trials include her husband Armando's infidelity and his suggestion that is her fault, her realization of her best friend Marlene's true sinister and envious nature, and her relationship with her resentful sister and her niece, who later becomes Armando's mistress.

== Cast ==
=== Main ===
- Edith González as Eva Soler
- Arap Bethke as Pablo Contreras
- Jorge Luis Pila as Armando Montes
- Erika de la Rosa as Marlene Palacios
- Javier Díaz Dueñas as Martín Contreras
- Vanessa Bauche as Soraya Luna
- Sofía Lama as Elizabeth "Betty" Cárdenas
- Henry Zakka as Robert Monteverde
- Roberto Mateos as Pancho Mogollón
- Antonio Gaona as Andrés "Andy" Palacios
- Katie Barberi as Cynthia Monteverde
- Karen Sentíes as Carmen Soler
- Minnie West as Adriana Montes
- Adrián Carvajal as Jota Jota "J.J." Juárez
- Jonathan Freudman as Robert "Bobby" Monteverde Jr. / Luis Mogollón
- Michelle Vargas as Sofía Soler
- Jorge Eduardo García as Diego Contreras
- Nicole Apollonio as Fabiola Montes
- Martha Mijares as Bertha Soler
- Dayana Garroz as Marisol
- Alfredo Huereca as Evencio Melgar

=== Recurring ===
- Gaby Borges as Teresa Aguilar
- Mónica Sánchez Navarro as Federica Miraval
- Paloma Márquez as Virginia Blanco
- Ana Osorio as Camila Rosas
- Maritza Bustamante as Ana María Granados
- María Raquenel as Rebeca Marín
- Tony Vela as Antonio "El Chivo" García
- Adriana Bermúdez as Noemi Ávila
- Gustavo Pedraza as Esteban Corrales
- Christian Cataldi as Jorge
- Eduardo Shilinsky as Ernesto Soler
- Omar Germenos as Reynaldo Santacruz
- Alpha Acosta as Anastasia Soler

== Production ==
The cast of the telenovela was confirmed on December 2, 2015. The telenovela was filmed in Miami, United States.

== Awards and nominations ==
Year	Award	Category	Recipient	Result	Ref.
2016	Premios Tu Mundo	Novela of the Year	Eva la Trailera	Nominated	
2016	Premios Tu Mundo	Favorite Lead Actor - Novela	Arap Bethke	Nominated	
2016	Premios Tu Mundo	Favorite Lead Actor - Novela	Jorge Luis Pila	Nominated	
2016	Premios Tu Mundo	Favorite Lead Actress - Novela	Edith González	Nominated	
2016	Premios Tu Mundo	The Best Bad Girl - Novela	Sofía Lama	Nominated	
2016	Premios Tu Mundo	The Best Bad Girl - Novela	Erika de la Rosa	Won	
2016	Premios Tu Mundo	Favorite Actress - Novela	Vanessa Bauche	Nominated	
2016	Premios Tu Mundo	Favorite Actor - Novela	Roberto Mateos	Nominated	
2016	Premios Tu Mundo	Favorite Actor - Novela	Jonathan Freudman	Won	
2016	Premios Tu Mundo	The Perfect Couple - Novela	Edith González and Arap Bethke	Nominated	
2016	Premios Tu Mundo	Revelation of The Year	Nicole Apollonio	Nominated	
