= Pecadora (TV series) =

- Genre: Telenovela
- Created by: Verónica Suárez
- Directed by: Raúl De La Nuez
- Starring: Litzy; Eduardo Capetillo; Marjorie de Sousa; Daniel Elbittar; Maritza Bustamante; Paulo Quevedo; Susana Perez
- Opening theme: "Odiame pero no me dejes" by Eduardo Antonio
- Ending theme: "Pecadora" by Litzy
- Countries of origin: Venezuela; United States
- Original language: Spanish
- No. of episodes: 145

Production
- Executive producers: Arquimides Rivero; Peter Tinoco; Ana Teresa Arismendi
- Producer: Jeanette Gómez
- Production location: Miami
- Running time: 40-44 minutes
- Production company: Venevisión

Original release
- Network: Univision; Venevisión
- Release: August 10, 2009 – June 19, 2010

Related
- Alma indomable; Sacrificio de mujer

Pecadora (Sinner) is a telenovela produced in Miami, Florida by Venevision Productions, LLC.

It began airing on November 9, 2009, via TC Televisión in Ecuador at 22:00. It was released in Venezuela on August 25, 2010 at 3pm by the original channel Venevision. Univision began airing the telenovela on May 3, 2010 at the 12pm/11c timeslot. It has since aired in Colombia, Canada, Mexico, Dominican Republic, El Salvador, Guatemala and Bulgaria.

Pecadora is a remake of Como en el Cine and is written by the original writer, Verónica Suárez. In turn Como en el Cine is apparently a spin-off of a movie entitled "Coyote Ugly" wherein dancers danced on a bar counter.

Eduardo Capetillo, Litzy Dominguez, and Marjorie de Sousa are the main stars alongside Daniel Elbittar, Maritza Bustamante, Ariel López Padilla, Silvana Arias, and others.

== Plot ==
The plot sort of inches along slowly with a multitude of repetitive discussions by various characters about what some plan to do and about what has already happened, along with flash-backs. Much time is spent filming girls dancing on the bar with the audience reactions.

To the eyes of the world, Luz María is a successful psychologist who makes enough money to take care of her family and to pay for a luxurious boarding school education for her younger sister, though the story did not develop the psychology practice to any significant extent. The audience sees Luz fake being a psychologist only briefly. In reality, Luz María makes her living as a dancer in a nightclub, though really most of the time it is other girls the audience sees dancing and not Luz María. Although she did study psychology at university, she was forced to leave school at the death of her father, and she left it in charge of her brothers. The story line about Luz María is weakly developed (her role being almost a MacGuffin role) while the role of the antagonist, Samantha, is much developed.

Ashamed to admit her true occupation, Luz María has arranged things to deceive everyone, maintaining a low profile and keeping few close friends. But when she meets Bruno, her secret becomes a heavy load that threatens to destroy her happiness.

Bruno, an honest industrialist who belongs to a prominent family, thinks that he has fallen in love not only with the perfect woman, but besides that, due to her academic preparation, she can help him deal with the trauma generated by the disappearance of his twin brother many years ago. What he never imagines is the surprise he will receive related to that ideal woman that he thinks he has found. The writer or production did not choose to give many scenes of Luz doing psychotherapy (like having Bruno on a couch).

Samantha, Bruno's former fiancée, jealous and bitter because he broke off their relationship when he met Luz María, conspires with her malicious father, Genaro, and with Bruno's mother Angela -who wasted the fortune she inherited from her husband and who wants to see Bruno married to Samantha- to do everything possible to separate Luz María and Bruno. After submitting Luz María to countless humiliations, they manage to discover her true job, and cruelly they reveal the secret to Bruno, making her sound deceitful... and sinful.

From that moment, Luz María must fight the hardest battle of her life: to convince Bruno that she is not the calculating gold-digger he thinks she is, and that her love is true.

To complicate things even more, Bruno's twin brother -whom everyone thinks is dead- appears in Luz María's life as a regular at the nightclub, and he also falls in love with her. Bernardo (Bernie), who remembers neither his past nor his true last name, only knows and loves her as “Lucecita” the dancer. The story of the twin brother becomes a story within the story as the mafia is out to kill Bernie. The twin brother is much more vivacious than Bruno, who is rather straight.

Despite the above, what really becomes the story (for a while) is the story of Samantha, who gets in a struggle over a gun with another woman, who is shot and dies. The disposal of the body and legal fall out over the death of that woman takes over the story for a while. In the end, Samantha replaces Luz María as the star dancer and singer in the bar, and Samantha becomes a sympathetic character at the end. While Luz María never is shown singing a song through without interruption or bar hub-bub obscuring her song, Samantha gets to sing a beautiful song at the end of the story, song sung without interruption.

The story is told with a number of stock, well-used, telenovela conventions like unknown/mistaken parentage, two brothers after one woman, twins played by one actor (twins who look exactly alike), rich evil novia with whom the male protagonist fornicates, older ally of the evil rich novia, characters who lie most of the way through the story, fake wedding, and the end of the telenovela with a wedding.

== Cast ==
- Litzy as Luz María Mendoza, protagonist,
- Eduardo Capetillo as Bruno Alcocer/Bernie Alcocer, protagonist,
- Marjorie de Sousa as Samantha Sabater, antagonist/protagonist, daughter of Muneca and Genaro
- Daniel Elbittar as Ricky Perez
- Maritza Bustamante as Barbie
- Paulo Quevedo as El Mechas
- Lina Santos as Muñeca / Fernanda
- Ariel López Padilla as Gregorio antagonist.
- Roberto Vander as Calletano
- Sergio Kleiner as Don Genaro Sabater antagonist.
- Héctor Soberón as Carlos
- Lianneth Borrego as Reyna, friend of Luz Maria
- Karina Mora as Genoveva Anderson
- Jaider Villa as Alan Tejeiro, Supporting character
- Brenda Require as Romina, sister of Bruno and Bernie
- Paloma Marquez as Dulce, friend of Luz Maria
- Julio Capote as Elalio
- Juan Troya as Inspector Tulio Hernandez
- Julieta Rosen
- Carlos Yustes as Pancho
- Rafael Mercadente as Andres
- Susana Pérez as Angela Alcocer, antagonist.
- Silvana Arias as Violeta, sister of Luz Maria
- Jessica Cerezo as Rosy
- Enrique Sapene as Fernando
- Paola Pedroza as Lola
- Victoria Del Rosa as Vanesa, friend of Samantha
- Mariane Lovera as Liliana
- Monique Abbadie- Juana
- Eduardo Antonio as Chocolate
- Kevin Aponte
- Anna Sobero as Lupe
- Roxana Montenegro as Luisa
- Diana Osorio -Andrea
- Sandra Martínez
- Adrian Mas as dr. Alfonso Sallaberry
- German Barrios as Inspector Rebollar
- Ramon Morell
- Gerardo Riveron as Gomez
- Guadalupe Hernandez as Cesar
- Adriana Oliveros as Monica
- Rudy Pavon
- Ana Vina as director Veselina
- Mari Monge as Rosa
- Miguel Angel Cuello as policeman
- Anay Reyes
- Adita Riera
- Jorge Luis Garcia as Leopoldo Notario
