= Relaciones peligrosas =

- Genre: Telenovela
- Created by: Roberto Stopello
- Based on: Física o química by Carlos Montero
- Written by: José Vicente Spataro; Juan Marcos Blanco; Mariano Calasso; Indira Páez
- Directed by: Vicente Albarracín; Leonardo Galavis; Mariano Calasso; Ricardo Schwarz
- Starring: Sandra Echeverría; Ana Layevska; Gonzalo García Vivanco; Maritza Bustamante; Gabriel Coronel; Daniela Navarro
- Opening theme: "Solo por amor" by Samo
- Country of origin: United States
- Original language: Spanish
- No. of episodes: 108

Production
- Executive producers: Martha Godoy; David Posada
- Producer: Aimee Godínez
- Cinematography: Juan Pablo Puentes; José Luis Velarde; Pedro Avila
- Editor: Hader Antivar Duque
- Camera setup: Multi-camera
- Production company: Telemundo Studios

Original release
- Network: Telemundo
- Release: January 24 – June 25, 2012

Relaciones peligrosas (English: Dangerous Affairs), originally known as Física o Química (Physics or Chemistry), is an American Spanish-language telenovela produced by Telemundo Studios, Miami. It is an adaptation of the Spanish television series Física o Química. Starring Sandra Echeverría, Gabriel Coronel, Maritza Bustamante, Jonathan Freudman, Carlos Ferro, Daniela Navarro, Renato Rossini, Gonzalo García Vivanco and in the leading roles of the plot.

== History ==
From January 24 to June 25, 2012, Telemundo aired Relaciones Peligrosas weeknights at 10pm/9c during the 2012 season, replacing La Casa de al Lado. As with most of its other telenovelas, the network broadcast English subtitles as closed captions on CC3.

== Story ==
Set in modern times, Dangerous Affairs delves into the difficult and often conflict-filled relationships between teenagers, their parents and teachers at a bilingual high school (Cervantes Academy School of Arts). Everything begins with the story of Miranda Cruz (Sandra Echeverría), a beautiful young woman who begins an affair with Mauricio, her student, while a teacher in this institution. In her world, the hidden truths that many adults try to avoid are revealed: love relationships that are prohibited, discriminated or judged that can turn into a real-world nightmare.

== Cast ==
=== Main ===
- Sandra Echeverría as Miranda Beatriz Cruz
- Ana Layevska as Patricia "Patty" Milano
- Gonzalo García Vivanco as Juan Pablo Reyes / JP / Daniel Arámbula / Gael Sánchez
- Maritza Bustamante as Ana Conde
- Gabriel Coronel as Mauricio Blanco
- Daniela Navarro as Olivia Kloster

=== Recurring ===
- Kyle George - Osvaldo
- Mercedes Molto - Benita Mendoza
- Sandra Destenave - Carmen de Blanco
- Carlos Ferro - Santiago Madrazo
- Jesús Licciardelo - Oliver Torres
- Jorge Consejo - Gilberto Verdugo
- Ana Carolina Grajales - Sofía Blanco
- Danilo Carrera - Leonardo Máximo
- Orlando Fundichely - Orlando Aragón
- Dad Dager - Clementina de Máximo
- Andy Pérez - Cassius Dupont
- Óscar Priego - Gonzalo Mendoza
- Jeanette Lehr - Teresa Vargas
- Héctor Fuentes - Armando Madrazo
- Christian de la Campa - Joaquin Rivera
- Rubén Morales - Ricardo Gómez
- Yadira Santana - Guadalupe "Lupe" Guzmán
- Renato Rossini - Manuel Blanco
- Jimmy Bernal - Andrés Máximo
- Carmen Olivares - Soledad Cruz
- Modesto Lacen - Bertrand Dupont
- Jezabel Montero - Mrs. Aragón
- RJ Coleman - Robert "Bob / Gringo" McDowell
- Kevin Aponte - Alejandro "Ale" Portillo
- Jonathan Freudman - Diego Barón
- Alex Hernandez - Sebastián Aragón
- Yrahid Leylanni - Yesenia Rivera
- Ana Lorena Sánchez - Elizabeth Gómez
- Dayana Garroz - Julia Madrazo
- Cristina Mason - Nora Guzmán
- Alma Matrecito - Violeta Verdugo
- Alan Rodriguez - Rodrigo Aragón
- Nicole Apolonio - Emily

== Awards and nominations ==
Though Relaciones Peligrosas was nominated for Favorite Lead Actor, The Best Bad Boy, Best Supporting Actor and Actress, The Perfect Couple, and The Best Kiss,; it did not win any awards.

Year	Award	Category	Nominee	Result
2012	Premios Tu Mundo	Favorite Lead Actor	Gabriel Coronel	Nominated
2012	Premios Tu Mundo	The Best Bad Boy	Gonzalo García Vivanco	Nominated
2012	Premios Tu Mundo	Best Supporting Actress	Maritza Bustamante	Nominated
2012	Premios Tu Mundo	Best Supporting Actress	Daniela Navarro	Nominated
2012	Premios Tu Mundo	Best Supporting Actor	Orlando Fundicheli	Nominated
2012	Premios Tu Mundo	Best Supporting Actor	Jorge Consejo	Nominated
2012	Premios Tu Mundo	The Perfect Couple	Ana Layevska and Christian de la Campa	Nominated
2012	Premios Tu Mundo	The Best Kiss	Ana Layevska and Christian de la Campa	Nominated
2012	Premios People en Español	Best Telenovela	Roberto Stopello	Nominated
2012	Premios People en Español	Best Actress	Sandra Echeverría	Nominated
2012	Premios People en Español	Best Actor	Gabriel Coronel	Nominated
2012	Premios People en Español	Best Supporting Actress	Ana Layevska	Nominated
2012	Premios People en Español	Best Supporting Actor	Carlos Ferro	Nominated
2012	Premios People en Español	Best Villain	Gonzalo García Vivanco	Nominated
2012	Premios People en Español	Revelation of the Year	Gabriel Coronel	Nominated
2012	Premios People en Español	Best Couple	Sandra Echeverría y Gabriel Coronel	Nominated
2013	Miami Life Awards	Best Telenovela	Roberto Stopello	Nominated
2013	Miami Life Awards	Best Actress	Sandra Echeverría	Nominated
2013	Miami Life Awards	Best Actor	Gabriel Coronel	Won
2013	Miami Life Awards	Best Supporting Actress	Maritza Bustamante	Nominated
2013	Miami Life Awards	Best Supporting Actress	Ana Layevska	Nominated
2013	Miami Life Awards	Best Supporting Actor	Carlos Ferro	Nominated
2013	Miami Life Awards	Best Supporting Actor	Orlando Fundicheli	Nominated
2013	Miami Life Awards	Best Actress Villain	Daniela Navarro	Nominated
2013	Miami Life Awards	Best Actor Villain	Gonzalo García Vivanco	Nominated
2013	Miami Life Awards	First Best Actress	Jeannette Lehr	Nominated
2013	Miami Life Awards	Best Actress Revelation	Yrahid Leylanni	Won
2013	Miami Life Awards	Best Actor Revelation	Danilo Carrera	Won
2013	Miami Life Awards	Best Actor Revelation	Jonathan Freudman	Nominated
2013	Miami Life Awards	Best Actor Revelation	Oscar Priego	Nominated
2013	Miami Life Awards	Best Actor Revelation	Isaac Reyes	Nominated
