= Gonzalo García Vivanco =

Mexican actor

- Born: Gonzalo García Vivanco; 25 December 1981 (age 44); Guadalajara, Jalisco, Mexico
- Occupations: Actor, model
- Years active: 2002–present
- Modeling information
- Hair color: Brown

Gonzalo García Vivanco (born 25 December 1981) is a Mexican actor in telenovelas and a model. He is best known for his participation in the series Soy tu fan, and for having been the antagonist in the telenovela Relaciones Peligrosas.

== Biography ==
Gonzalo García Vivanco was born in Guadalajara, Jalisco. He has three brothers, Juan Cristobal, Paul Ignacio, Marco and a sister named Natalia. When he was 10 he moved for a year to Seville, Spain, before returning to Guadalajara. He studied at the Liceo del Valle with an option in theatre.

== Career ==
From the age of 19, Garcia Vivanco studied for three years at the Center for Studies and Training Actoral (CEFAC) of TV Azteca, later participating in some of the company's television productions, such as the telenovelas Las Juanas, Soñarás and Un nuevo amor. Later he studied at the school of theater CASAZUL and then decided to go to Madrid, Spain, for three years to continue studying acting. While in Spain, he visited several European countries, worked as a waiter, in public relations and as a model, in order to fund his travel.

== Filmography ==
Television
Year	Title	Character	Notes
2003	Un nuevo amor	Pablo de la Vega Montoya	Recurring role
2004	Soñarás	Pablo	
2004	Las cinco caras del amor	Juan Ignacio	
2009	Verano de amor	Mauro Villalba Duarte	Main role
2010-11	Ojo por ojo	Arcangel Barragan	Main cast
2010-12	Soy tu fan	Diego García	
2012	Relaciones peligrosas	Juan Pablo Reyes "JP" / Daniel Arámbula / Gael Sánchez	Main cast/ Villain
2013	La Patrona	Luis "Lucho" Vampa	Main cast
2014	Los miserables	Pedro Morales	Guest star
2014-15	Tierra de reyes	Flavio Gallardo	Main role
2017-18	Las Malcriadas	Diego Mendoza	Main role
2019-20	El Dragón: Return of a Warrior	Roberto Garza	Guest star
2019	Cuna de Lobos	Jose Carlos Larios	Main role
2021	La desalmada	Rigoberto Murillo Campos	Main cast
2022	Corazón guerrero	Jesús Guerrero	Main role
2023	Golpe de suerte	Tadeo	Main role

Music video
Year	Title	Character	Notes
2011	Eres un mamón		Music video by Amandititita
2011	¡Corre!	Eduardo	Music video by Jesse & Joy

== Theater ==
Year	Work	Company	Character	Director	Theatre
2008	La Lámpara Verde	Teatro Barlovento		Juan Campesino	Teatro Julio Prieto
2008	Trainspotting	Compañía Gabriel Retes		Gabriel Retes	Teatro Julio Prieto

== Awards ==
Awards and nominations
Year	Award	Category	Nominated work	Result
2009	Premios People en Español	Best Actor / Actor Youth	Verano de Amor	Nominated
2010	Premios TVyNovelas	Best Young Actor	Verano de Amor	Nominated
2012	Premios Tu Mundo	The Bad More Good	Relaciones Peligrosas	Nominated
2012	Premios People en Español	Best Villain	Relaciones Peligrosas	Nominated
2013	Miami Life Awards	Best Villain Actor Telenovela	Relaciones Peligrosas	Nominated
2013	Premios Tu Mundo	Best Supporting Actor	La Patrona	Won
