= Jonathan Freudman =

Venezuelan actor

- Born: Jonathan Joseph Freudman Quintana; June 8, 1990 (age 35); Caracas, Venezuela
- Spouse: Carolina Mestrovic

Jonathan Joseph Freudman Quintana (born June 8, 1990) is a Venezuelan actor.

== Filmography ==
Television roles
Year	Title	Roles	Notes
2002	Mambo y canela	Ruddy	Recurring role
2010	Aurora	Fake Police Officer	Episode: "Gran lanzamiento"
2011	Alguien te mira	Deliverer	Episode: "Envío anómimo"
2011	Mi corazón insiste en Lola Volcán	Pancho	5 episodes
2012	Relaciones peligrosas	Diego Barón	Recurring role; 25 episodes
2012	Corazón valiente	Rodrigo Sandoval	Recurring role
2014	En otra piel	Gabriel Cantú	Recurring role; 137 episodes
2015	Toni, la Chef	Frenchie Fuccinelli	40 episodes
2016	Olympia	Diego Delgado	Television film
2016	Eva la trailera	Robert "Bobby" Monteverde Jr. / Luis Mogollón	Recurring role; 111 episodes
2018	Al otro lado del muro	Julián Martínez	Recurring role
2019	Club 57 (TV series)	Miguel and Droide	Recurring role
