= Mi corazón insiste en Lola Volcán =

Spanish-language telenovela

- Genre: telenovela
- Created by: Valentina Párraga
- Based on: Yo amo a Paquita Gallego by Julio Jiménez
- Written by: Valentina Párraga; Sandra Velasco
- Story by: Julio Jiménez
- Directed by: Leonardo Galavís; Nicolás Diblasi
- Creative director: Óscar Cortés Cortés
- Starring: Carmen Villalobos; Jencarlos Canela; Angélica María; Ana Layevska; Fabián Ríos
- Theme music composer: Rudy Pérez
- Opening theme: "Mi corazón insiste" by Jencarlos Canela
- Country of origin: United States
- Original language: Spanish
- No. of episodes: 133

Production
- Executive producer: Aurelio Valcárcel Carroll
- Producer: Gemma Lombardi Ortín
- Production locations: Miami, Los Angeles
- Editor: Ellery Albarran

Original release
- Network: Telemundo
- Release: May 23 – November 28, 2011

Related
- Aurora; Una Maid en Manhattan

Mi corazón insiste en Lola Volcán (My Heart Beats for Lola Volcan) is a Spanish-language telenovela produced by the United States–based television network Telemundo.

Telemundo aired the serial from May 23 to November 28, 2011, at 8 p.m. central. As with most of its other telenovelas, the network broadcasts English subtitles as closed captions on CC3. It is a remake of Colombian telenovela of 1998 to 1999, Yo amo a Paquita Gallego by Julio Jimenez.

== Plot ==
"Love is an adrenaline and feeling in which the world disappears when you cling to a woman who loves and hates with the force of a volcano. Only she has wept in silence of suffering, lives intensely in the pain, and loves in the hours of true happiness; Because she is Lola Volcán ..."

== Cast ==
=== Main ===
- Carmen Villalobos as María Dolores "Lola" Volcán
- Jencarlos Canela as Andrés Suárez / Andrés Santacruz
- Angélica María as Isabel "Chabela" Volcán
- Ana Layevska as Débora Noriega, main female villain, hates Lola, obsessed with Andres, mistress of Marcelo, murdered him, killed by Diana
- Fabián Ríos as Ángel Meléndez, main male villain, in love with Lola, killed Tiberio, Fulgencio and Diana, shot by Andres to save Lola

==== Secondary ====
- Katie Barberi as Victoria "Vicky" de Noriega, villain, later turns good
- Carlos Torres as Rodrigo Suárez, police officer, father of Andres, in love with Soledad
- Rossana San Juan as Soledad Volcán, former lover of Tiberio, mother of Lola, in love with Rodrigo. She is kidnapped by Débora, and is held captive by Tiberio, and then Angel for over a year (at one point is presumed dead) and it becomes a main focus of the series to find her.
- Gerardo Murguía as Marcelo Santacruz, villain, hates Andres and Lola, kills Veronica, murdered by Débora
- Alejandro Suárez as Diógenes Rugeles, in love with Lola, hates Andres
- Liannet Borrego as Verónica Alcázar, in love with Daniel, hates Adela, and killed by Marcelo
- Mauricio Hénao as Daniel Santacruz, villain, later good, in love with Adela but left her for Veronica, becomes a drug addict, ends up together with Adela
- Carlos Ferro as Camilo Andrade, a lawyer, Andres' best friend, is in love with Sofia
- Cynthia Olavarría as Sofía Palacios, a psychiatrist, Andres' aunt, in love with Camilo
- Roberto Huicochea as José "Pepe" Linares, Adela's grandfather, in love and marries to Etelvina
- Rubén Morales as Ramón Noriega, villain, accomplice of Marcelo, the father of Débora, husband of Vicky, is murdered by Angel
- Paloma Márquez as Adela "Adelita" Linares, Lola's best friend, turns against her family and becomes a prostitute but escapes a reunites with her family, she's initially in love with Daniel, then Fulgencio Lopez (whom would be the father of her child), but ends up together with Daniel after Lopez is murdered.
- Lino Martone as Fulgencio López, in love with Adela (is the father of her child), killed by Angel
- Jeannette Lehr as María Etelvina Rengifo / Eduviges Rengifo, villain, later good, is in love with Diógenes, then falls in love and marries Pepe
- Carolina Tejera as Diana Mirabal, villain, in love with Andres, has a baby from Angel, killed by him
- Roberto Mateos as Tiberio Guzman, villain, mafioso, real father of Lola, rapes Soledad, killed by Angel

=== Recurring ===
- Adrián Di Monte as Papi
- Jonathan Freudman as Pancho

=== Guest ===
- Elluz Peraza as Laura Palacios

== Awards and nominations ==
Year	Award	Category	Nominated	Result
2012	Premios Tu Mundo	Novela of the Year	Mi corazón insiste	Won
2012	Premios Tu Mundo	Favorite Lead Actor	Jencarlos Canela	Won
2012	Premios Tu Mundo	The Best Bad Girl	Ana Layevska	Nominated
2012	Premios Tu Mundo	Best Supporting Actress	Katie Barberi	Nominated
2012	Premios Tu Mundo	The Perfect Couple	Carmen Villalobos and Jencarlos Canela	Nominated
2012	Premios Tu Mundo	The Best Kiss	Carmen Villalobos and Jencarlos Canela	Nominated
2012	Premios Tu Mundo	Best Bad Luck Video	La familia llega an arruinar la boda de Lola Volcán	Won
2012	Premios Tu Mundo	Best Novela Soundtrack	Mi corazón insiste by Jencarlos Canela	Won

== Broadcasters ==
=== International Broadcasters ===
Bosnia and Herzegovina on Pink BH at 2012 as Moje srce kuca za Lolu

Serbia on Pink TV at 2012 as Moje srce kuca za Lolu

Montenegro on Pink M at 2012 as Moje srce kuca za Lolu
