= Paloma Márquez =

Mexican actress (born 1986)

- Born: April 12, 1986 (age 39); Tijuana, Baja California
- Occupation: Actress
- Years active: 2004-present
- Height: 1.60 m
- Children: Santiago Corona

Paloma Márquez (born April 12, 1986) is a Mexican actress.

== Filmography ==
=== Films ===
Year	Title	Role	Notes
2007	Exploring Love	Bastian's Girlfriend #1	
2010	Seres: Génesis	Lyra	
2015	Los Ocho	Clara Valvarde/Laura Villafane	Antagonist
2015	The Others		Short film

=== Television ===
Year	Title	Role	Notes
2004	Rebelde	Hilda	Recurring role
2006	Las dos caras de Ana	Luciana	Recurring role
2007	Bajo las riendas del amor	Pili	Recurring role
2010	Pecadora	Dulce	Recurring role
2011	Sacrificio de mujer	Mitzy	Recurring role
2011	Mi corazón insiste en Lola Volcán	Adela "Adelita" Linares	Co-lead role
2011	Grachi	Isadora	16 episodes
2012	Corazón valiente	Sol Díaz de León	Recurring role
2012-2013	El rostro de la venganza	Natalia García	Co-lead role
2014	Reina de corazones	Miriam Fuentes	Co-lead role
2015	Cartas del corazón	Eugenia	1 episode
2016	Eva la Trailera	Virginia Blanco	Recurring role
2019	Betty en NY	María Lucía Valencia	Recurring role
