= Corazón guerrero =

Mexican telenovela

- Genre: Telenovela
- Based on: Valientes by: Marcos Carnevale; & Lily Ann Martin
- Developed by: Katia Rodríguez Estrada
- Written by: Carolina Mejía Lartilleux; Fernando Garcilita
- Directed by: Jorge Robles; Edgar Ramírez
- Starring: Alejandra Espinoza; Gonzalo García Vivanco; Altair Jarabo; Oka Giner; Christian de la Campa; Rodrigo Guirao
- Opening theme: "Espacio en tu corazón" by Enrique Iglesias
- Composer: Alvaro Trespalacios
- Country of origin: Mexico
- Original language: Spanish
- No. of seasons: 1
- No. of episodes: 120

Production
- Executive producer: Salvador Mejía
- Producer: Liliana Cuesta Aguirre
- Camera setup: Multi-camera
- Production company: TelevisaUnivision

Original release
- Network: Las Estrellas
- Release: 28 March – 9 September 2022

Corazón guerrero (English title: Daring Heart) is a Mexican telenovela that aired on Las Estrellas from 28 March 2022 to 9 September 2022. The series is produced by Salvador Mejía for TelevisaUnivision. It is an adaptation of the Argentine telenovela Valientes, and stars Alejandra Espinoza and Gonzalo García Vivanco.

== Plot ==
The telenovela follows the brothers, Jesús (Gonzalo García Vivanco), Damián (Rodrigo Guirao) and Samuel (Christian de la Campa), who are separated when their father dies and are given up for adoption to different families. Years later, Jesús manages to reunite with his brothers and, in front of their father's grave, they vow to punish Augusto Ruíz Montalvo (Diego Olivera) for destroying their family. To achieve their goal, the Guerrero brothers gain the trust of Augusto until they infiltrate his family. They decide to unleash the fury of their revenge on Augusto's daughters. Determined to fulfill the oath he swore before his father's tomb, Jesús will try to silence his feelings for Mariluz (Alejandra Espinoza).

== Cast ==
=== Main ===
- Alejandra Espinoza as Mariluz García
- Gonzalo García Vivanco as Jesús Guerrero
- Altaír Jarabo as Carlota Ruíz Montalvo
- Oka Giner as Doménica Ruíz
- Christian de la Campa as Samuel Guerrero
- Rodrigo Guirao as Damián Guerrero
- Diego Olivera as Augusto Ruíz Montalvo
- Sabine Moussier as Victoriana Peñalver
- René Casados as Heriberto Villalba
- Josh Gutiérrez as Federico Duarte
- Manuel Ojeda as Abel
- Aleida Núñez as Selena Recuero
- Ana Martín as Conchita García
- Natalia Esperón as Guadalupe García
- Karena Flores as Emma Ruíz
- Sian Chiong as Adrián
- Gabriela Spanic as Elisa

=== Recurring ===
- Pablo Valentín as Valero
- Rafael del Villar as Gabino Beltrán
- Yekaterina Kiev as Micaela
- Sergio Acosta as Bautista
- Emilio Galván as Saúl
- Luis Lauro as Iker
- Cristian Gamero as Isaías Cabrera
- Pamela Cervantes as Fabiola
- Patricio de Rodas as Rodrigo
- Patricia Maqueo as Belén
- Raúl Ortero as Sergio
- Samantha Vázquez as Lola
- Fernanda Rivas as Renata
- Diego Arancivia as Gus
- Michelle Polanco as Laura
- José Luis Duval as Santiago
- Tanya Vázquez as Briana
- Juan Colucho as Patricio Salgado

=== Guest stars ===
- Eduardo Yáñez as Octavio Sánchez

== Production ==
The telenovela was announced in October 2021 at Televisa's upfront for 2022. On 25 November 2021, Alejandra Espinoza and Gonzalo García Vivanco were announced in the lead roles. Filming began on 17 January 2022.

== Ratings ==
Season	Timeslot (CT)	Episodes	First aired		Last aired	
Season	Timeslot (CT)	Episodes	Date	Viewers (millions)	Date	Viewers (millions)
1	Mon–Fri 4:30 p.m.	120	28 March 2022	2.2	9 September 2022	2.5

== Episodes ==
No.	Title	Original release date
1	"Tienes que hacer justicia"	28 March 2022 (Note: Premiered early online through Las Estrellas website on 26 March 2022.)
Jesús finds out that his brother Samuel is alive and is being treated as a slave at a ranch. Damián manages to get out of jail. Jesús decides to rescue Samuel, but during the rescue he is injured. Mariluz and Guadalupe are worried about Conchita's health. Conchita asks her daughter to reveal the truth. Carlota apologizes to her sister Doménica for her hostile attitude. Mariluz meets Jesús in the hospital and he is reunited with Augusto Ruiz.
2	"Vamos a dar batalla"	29 March 2022
Jesús sets out to fix Mariluz's truck. Doméncia learns about Carlota's past and Augusto asks her to understand her. Samuel and Damián arrive at their new house and Jesús tells his brothers what Augusto did to their father and informs them that from now on they are the Guerrero brothers. Jesús accompanies his cousin Adrián to say goodbye to his mother. Carlota is sure that Jesús liked her. Mariluz discovers that Jesús is the one who crashed her truck. Carlota learns that her sister Doménica was deported.
3	"Somos el uno para el otro"	30 March 2022
Conchita asks Guadalupe to tell Mariluz the truth about her father. Emma starts drinking and almost suffers a mishap in Rodrigo's boat. Jesús plans to return the money they found, but Damián refuses. Carlota wants to gain Jesús' trust. Augusto fulfills Conchita's wish. Augusto reveals to Guadalupe that she was the most important woman in his life. Jesús assures Mariluz that they are right for each other, but she rejects him.
4	"Las acciones nos definen"	31 March 2022
Augusto learns that Victoriana visited Guadalupe. Damián leaves home and leaves his brothers a farewell letter. Jesús prevents something bad from happening to Mariluz. Rodrigo confesses his feelings to Emma, but she is not looking for a relationship. Jesús realizes that the money is missing. Mariluz arrives at Jesús' workshop to thank him for what he did, but finds him with Carlota. Jesús and his brothers swear an oath in front of their father's grave. Mariluz suffers on her first day of work.
5	"Perder lo que más ama"	1 April 2022
Augusto manages to save the Guerrero brothers. Guadalupe fears that Mariluz will fall for Isaías' lies again. Jesús plans to make Augusto's daughters fall in love with him and his brothers to get revenge. Isaías looks for Mariluz to ask for a second chance. Jesús wants to see Mariluz, but she refuses. Jesús kicks Carlota out of his house, Augusto complains to him, but Jesús assures him that he is only complying with the agreement. Mariluz agrees to go out with Jesús.
6	"Echar la casa por la ventana"	4 April 2022
Jesús asks Abel for help to be presentable for Victoriana's party. Mica asks Mariluz if she can help her at her boss’s party. Jesús and his brothers surprise everyone when they arrive at Victoriana's party. Carlota welcomes Jesús and Mariluz thinks they kissed. Damián finds the knife that his dad gave Augusto. Victoriana discovers that Mariluz is at her party and humiliates her.
7	"Un juramento"	5 April 2022
Jesús accepts that he fell in love with Mariluz. Damián fears that his brothers' revenge plan will not come to fruition. Augusto suspects that the Guerrero brothers are not using their real identity. Doménica discovers the drawing that Damián made for her. Augusto asks Carlota not to get her hopes up with Jesús. Mariluz complains to Jesús for lying to her, he assures her that everything is due to an oath he made, but he cannot reveal it to her. Mariluz falls for Isaías’ lie. Valero tells some of the secrets that Augusto had with the former owner of the shop.
8	"La sangre de un Ruiz Montalvo"	6 April 2022
Federico follows the investigation against the Guerrero brothers. Victoriana has a plan to kill Guadalupe. Carlota tells Doménica that she is going out with Jesús. Doménica tries to cancel her family trip. Samuel visits Tata to warn him that the police are looking for him. Jesús goes out with Carlota and Mariluz sees them. Victoriana gets angry with Emma for kissing Adrián. Carlota makes a pass at Jesús on their date.
9	"Todos los pájaros cantan"	7 April 2022
Jesús has dinner at Carlota's house, where he is interrogated by Augusto and Doménica. Damián shows Jesús Doménica's passport with a deported stamp. Jesús asks Abel for help in investigating Doménica. Augusto's men plan to kidnap Abel. Isaías visits Mariluz to prove to her that he is divorced. Samuel gives Doménica her passport and she burns it to get rid of Carlota's blackmail. Doménica receives a judicial notification, Augusto questions her. Jesús looks for Abel. Carlota sees Mariluz and attacks her.
10	"Como un girasol"	8 April 2022
Jesus confesses to Mariluz that he will always take care of her. Samuel starts his classes. Damián seems to be interested in Doménica, but wants to keep his plans on track. Augusto receives recognition for his support of the foundation. The farmers that Jesús gathered arrive to publicly ask for Augusto’s help, which he cannot refuse. Jesús kisses Mariluz.
11	"Nadie se salva de un corazón roto"	11 April 2022
Mariluz believes that Jesús is only interested in Carlota and her money, so she decides to stay away from him. Carlota will not allow Mariluz to stay with Jesús. Conchita kicks Isaías out of her house. Samuel tries to kiss Doménica, but she rejects him. Emma gives the prize to Adrián and asks him to accept it since he deserved to win. Isaías threatens Jesús. Doménica agrees to go out with Damián and he surprises her with a kiss. Samuel has contact with El Tata again.
12	"Soy la mujer que buscas"	12 April 2022
Victoriana is upset to learn that Doménica went out with Damián. Doménica lies about her past to Damián. Emma agrees to be Adrián's girlfriend. Guadalupe arrives at the place where the wedding was supposed to take place, but learns that there is no event. Victoriana celebrates Guadalupe falling into her trap. Emma tells Adrián that she is diabetic. Carlota kisses Jesús, but he assures her that they are just friends. Guadalupe feels desperate about the money she lost on the flower arrangements. Doménica complains to Iker for what he did to her.
13	"Están en peligro de muerte"	13 April 2022
Mariluz remembers her promise to marry Lisardo. Jesús confesses to his brother that for Mariluz he is capable of anything, except breaking the oath he made to his father. Jesús asks to fight for his life, Abel begs him to be careful because Augusto is a dangerous man. Samuel decides to return to the ranch, but first he says goodbye to Doménica. Augusto assures Guadalupe that he will not stand for anything to happen to her. Victoriana takes advantage of the fact that she is with Federico to kiss him, but he refuses for fear that Augusto will arrive. Damián asks Jesús to forget about the plan. Carlota sends Mariluz the video where she is kissing Jesús and when she sees it, Mariluz slaps him.
14	"Me duele amarte"	14 April 2022
Augusto learns that the lawyer is still alive. Mariluz and Guadalupe confirm that Maurice swindled them. Samuel helps Doménica escape from the ranch. Victoriana does not allow Emma to have a relationship with one of the Guerrero brothers. Victoriana learns that Doménica was deported from the United States and Augusto asks her for an explanation. Guadalupe confronts Victoriana about what she did with the flowers and does not hesitate to confess that Augusto is still looking for her.
15	"Doménica no es buena"	15 April 2022
Jesús asks Doménica to stay away from his brothers. Carlota is upset to see that Jesús is helping Mariluz and her family with the sale of flowers. Mariluz makes peace with Jesús. Carlota tries to get Jesús' attention. Damián confesses to Doménica that he likes her. Augusto seeks out Guadalupe to convince her to accept his help. Jesús warns his brothers that Doménica is not a good person.
16	"Nos robaron todo"	18 April 2022
Victoriana learns that Augusto gave money to Guadalupe. Adrián takes Emma for a walk in Xochimilco. Samuel tells Doménica that he can't get close to her because of her legal situation. Damián fights with Samuel when he learns that he has feelings for Doménica. Damián surprises Doménica in her room to steal a kiss. Jesús learns that Augusto has taken it upon himself to help Mariluz and her family. Augusto plans to become Jesús' partner.
17	"Su madre vive"	19 April 2022
Victoriana gets upset with Emma for dating Adrián. Doménica apologizes to her father for hiding her legal problem from him. Abel begs Jesús to stay away from Carlota, but he refuses. Crispín asks Mariluz to stay in charge of the flower stand. Adrián learns that Elisa, his cousins' mother, is alive. Heriberto surprises Guadalupe with a bouquet of flowers to thank her for paying off the debt. Carlota burns down Mariluz's flower stand. Adrián confesses to his cousins that their mother is alive.
18	"Ley de causa y efecto"	20 April 2022
Mariluz learns that Crispín's flower stand is burning, Jesús tries to control the fire. Guadalupe faints from the shock and Augusto takes her to her house. Victoriana asks Emma to show her the video of the fire and both agree that Carlota was enjoying Mariluz's misfortune. Samuel surprises his brothers with the arrival of his horse Pinto. Victoriana is certain that Carlota set fire to the flower stand. Jesús gives Conchita back her truck and at the same time surprises Mariluz. Guadalupe asks Jesús to stay away from her daughter.
19	"Voy a luchar por él"	21 April 2022
Isaías complains to Mariluz for not looking for him in the fire at the flower stand, but she claims that he is never available when she needs him. Isaías confronts Jesús but his brothers arrive and prevent the fight from escalating. Mariluz refuses to leave Jesús, despite her family's opposition. Adrián looks for Emma at her house but she refuses his visit. Samuel asks Jesús about his life when they were together with their mother. Iker attacks Damián but Doménica separates them. Valero advises Samuel to test Doménica's love.
20	"El trabajo está hecho"	22 April 2022
Mariluz visits Jesús to warn him about Carlota without counting that Jesús would side with Carlota. Federico tells Victoriana that he bought Guadalupe's house. Gregorio tells Guadalupe that he sold the house and she will have to vacate. Gabino Beltrán visits the workshop incognito looking for Jesús. Federico warns Augusto that Gabino reappeared with intentions of denouncing him, but they want to disappear him. Gabino shows the Guerreros the evidence that Augusto murdered their father and they offer to support him to testify. Emma prepares for her date in which she will lose her virginity to Adrián. Doménica realizes that Damián took all the contents of her purse and calls him. Damián gets distracted and when he turns around, he realizes that Gabino is missing. When looking for him, they find Federico coming out of the same place where they later find Gabino dead. Selena confesses to Valero her attraction to Samuel, and since Doménica rejected him, she offers to teach him how to kiss.
21	"Se me desgarra el alma"	25 April 2022
Heriberto offers his house to Guadalupe, but she refuses. Augusto questions Carlota about whether she had anything to do with the fire at Mariluz's flower stand. Damián asks Jesús to stay away from Mariluz to continue with their plan. Damián assures Samuel that Doménica is not a woman for him. Adrian finds the painting of his cousins in Emma's hiding place. Augusto mistakes Victoriana for Guadalupe while they are intimate. Jesús asks Augusto for permission to go out with his daughter Carlota. Mariluz falls into Isaías' trap.
22	"Noviazgo formal"	26 April 2022
Damián and Samuel manage to escape from Augusto's house with their mother's painting. Jesús asks Carlota to be his girlfriend, Augusto gives his consent. Mariluz is disappointed in Jesús and agrees to marry Isaías. A mysterious woman visits Octavio's grave. Guadalupe tries to make Augusto jealous with Heriberto. Belén makes fun of Emma's failure to be with Adrián. Jesús learns that Mariluz is back with Isaías and threatens him not to hurt her.
23	"Ocúpate de tu vida"	27 April 2022
Conchita does not accept Mariluz's engagement to Isaías. Guadalupe tells Conchita that Jesús is already Carlota's boyfriend. Damián finds Samuel in Doménica's room. Augusto threatens to kill Iker. Damián feels betrayed by Samuel and they fight in front of Doménica, she kicks them out of the house. Rodrigo steals a kiss from Emma and posts on social media that he has already slept with her. Mariluz asks Jesús to leave her alone. Jesús talks to his brothers and asks them to stop fighting over Doménica. Mariluz wants to meet her father and asks Augusto to help her.
24	"Fiesta de compromiso"	28 April 2022
Guadalupe and Victoriana confront each other to see who will bring the food to the feast. Jesús discovers that Bautista is threatening Samuel. Victoriana learns that Emma lost her virginity, but she claims it is a lie from Rodrigo. Damián and Samuel accept that they are in love with Doménica and agree that she will be the one to decide for either of them. Victoriana wants Emma to marry Rodrigo and forbids her to see Adrián. Doménica identifies Bautista as her aggressor. Isaías gives Mariluz an engagement ring. Carlota takes advantage of the moment to make Jesús suffer. Victoriana knows who Mariluz's father is.
25	"No te voy a dejar en paz"	29 April 2022
Victoriana interrupts Mariluz's engagement party by assuring that she wants them out of her house as soon as possible. Damián believes that Samuel has already conquered Doménica's heart, and when she learns of Samuel's feelings, she asks him not to see her again. Carlota assures Mariluz that she will marry Jesús. Jesús prevents Mariluz from having an accident, Carlota tries to cure him, but in reality she is trying to seduce him. Victoriana ruins Guadalupe's pozole.
26	"Un juramento de amor"	2 May 2022
Augusto gives Mariluz news of the man who may know where her father is. Conchita meets Abel. Emma decides to run away with Adrián. Samuel asks Doménica to be just friends. Bautista sends a paper to Augusto to tell him that he has information about Octavio's children, but in exchange he asks for money. Carlota makes public her relationship with Jesús. Samuel beats up Damián and discovers that he broke into the Montalvo family's to steal. Samuel is willing to reveal the whole truth to Doménica.
27	"La mujer de Octavio Sánchez"	3 May 2022
Samuel confesses to Doménica that Damián is in love with her. Guadalupe is worried because all the people who ate her pozole got food poisoning. Augusto learns that his house was burglarized. Selena seduces Samuel. Carlota is desperate when she cannot find Jesús. Augusto is sure that he saw Elisa and when he wants to look for the painting he realizes that it is not there, so he concludes that Octavio's children were the ones who broke into his house. Jesús begs Damián not to leave.
28	"Meterse en la boca del lobo"	4 May 2022
Damián learns that Samuel spent the night with Selena. Emma tells Doménica that she slept with Adrián. Jesús learns that Bautista has already started looking for Augusto. Doménica looks for Damián, but he ignores her. Adrián and Emma sleep together again, but they don't use protection. Augusto learns that they have to cancel the test because of a problem with the driver, but Damián offers to drive the car. Mika reveals to Mariluz that it was Victoriana who poisoned Guadalupe's pozole. Carlota warns Victoriana that she will not let her destroy her happiness. Mariluz confirms to her mother that she already knows who her father is.
29	"Nuestra noche"	5 May 2022
Guadalupe assures Mariluz that Celestino is not her father, she asks her to confess the truth. Jesús refuses to be intimate with Carlota. Damián gives Bautista a hard blow. Conchita asks Mariluz to fight for Jesús' love. Victoriana blames Adrián for Emma being in danger. Damián asks Adrián to stay away from Emma and help them with the plan. Carlota finds Mariluz's handkerchief in Jesús' room so she looks for her to confront her, but during the fight she suffers an accident. Jesús finds the documents that condemn Augusto.
30	"Dame una señal"	6 May 2022
Mariluz says she has not done anything to Carlota, but Carlota denounces her. Mariluz is arrested, Guadalupe and Conchita object. Jesús tells Mariluz that he will get her out of jail, since there are videos that prove that Carlota caused the accident. Conchita asks Augusto to get Mariluz out of jail and then settles accounts with him. Jesús, in front of his father's grave, assures him that he has the evidence to bring Augusto down, but that is not enough. Mariluz is reunited with her father.
31	"Fuera del juramento"	9 May 2022
Victoriana mocks Carlota when she learns that Jesús could not be with her. Adrián confronts Renata about what she did to Emma. Augusto blocks Victoriana's credit cards and demands that she apologize to Guadalupe, but she refuses. Damián is determined to leave. Doménica collects the money for Damián, Samuel confirms that she is in love with his brother. Jesús is ready to denounce Augusto and confesses to Mariluz that he recently discovered that his mother is alive.
32	"Crisis de ansiedad"	10 May 2022
Damián asks Doménica to recognize that she feels the same way he does. Victoriana remembers when she found out that Guadalupe was expecting Augusto's child. Jesús shows Augusto the documents that could land him in jail. Doménica looks for Mariluz and asks her to stay away from Carlota since she is not an easy person. Carlota believes that Doménica wants to ruin her life and during the confrontation Doménica falls down the stairs. Victoriana asks Augusto to put order in Carlota's life. Emma fears she is pregnant.
33	"¿Hacemos el amor?"	11 May 2022
Carlota buys Jesús a drink and takes the opportunity to put a few drops of the elixir of love, he thinks he is with Mariluz. Doménica makes a confession to Damián. Samuel fights with Iker. Elisa discovers that her sons are alive. Carlota makes Jesús believe that he made love to her. Doménica asks Damián to hide their relationship. Carlota makes out with Iker. Emma takes a pregnancy test. Victoriana accepts that she is responsible for spoiling Guadalupe's pozole.
34	"Cosas turbias"	12 May 2022
Guadalupe is not convinced of Victoriana's forgiveness. Augusto is frustrated by Abel's disappearance and asks Federico to put Jesús in context. Mariluz discovers that Isaías is still married and his wife is expecting a second baby. Rodrigo sends men to beat up Adrián and takes advantage of Emma being alone to put a couple of drops in her drink, she begins to feel sick. Conchita kicks Isaías out of her house. Celestino arrives to work at Jesús' workshop. Victoriana gives Federico samples of Augusto and Mariluz for DNA testing. Samuel serenades Doménica.
35	"Hombres de negocios"	13 May 2022
Doménica confesses to Samuel that she is already Damián's girlfriend. Heriberto is sure that Celestino is an impostor. Samuel confronts Damián for taking Doménica away from him. Jesús prevents his brothers from fighting again. Carlota leaves therapy. Jesús saves Augusto's life but in the distraction of seeing Mariluz, he is shot. Augusto is willing to pay Jesús’ medical expenses for saving his life.
36	"Su vida pende de un hilo"	16 May 2022
Emma is arrested for causing an accident to an elderly person, she asks her mother for help, but she refuses. Augusto hides from Carlota that Jesús is hospitalized. Victoriana surprises Carlota by giving her her mother's wedding dress. Celestino steals Guadalupe's savings. Carlota arrives dressed as a bride at the hospital ready to see Jesús, but Augusto tries to talk to her. Emma is beaten, but Guadalupe manages to defend her. Mariluz and Carlota fight over Jesús.
37	"Ayúdalo a vivir"	17 May 2022
Augusto thanks Guadalupe for everything she did for Emma, but reproaches Victoriana for turning her back on her daughter. Damián threatens to unmask Augusto's true identity if anything happens to his brother. Jesús wakes up from his coma with Mariluz's kiss on his forehead. Carlota fights with Mariluz again and threatens to kill Jesús if she refuses to stay away from him. Guadalupe confronts Celestino for stealing her savings. Victoriana is determined to send Emma to study abroad.
38	"Orden de aprehensión"	18 May 2022
Victoriana confirms with the results of the DNA test that Mariluz is Augusto's daughter. Jesús escapes from the hospital. Valero locks Carlota in the bathroom. Mariluz writes a farewell letter and leaves home. Carlota learns that Mariluz has decided to stay away from Jesús. Doménica is arrested. Augusto surprises Guadalupe with a dinner and assures her that she is still the same woman he fell in love with.
39	"Una verdadera pista"	19 May 2022
Augusto manages to pay the bail to get Doménica out of jail. Elisa arrives at the farm and meets Mariluz. Emma joins Adrián's dance group. Elisa is sure that her sons are alive and that they are close to Augusto so she wants to get them back before he hurts them. Iker is arrested. Mariluz learns about the problems with the communal land holders and prevents them from setting fire to the farm. Adrián breaks up with Emma. Carlota proposes to Jesús to go to the farm so that he can finish his recovery.
40	"Prófuga de la justicia"	20 May 2022
Victoriana denies to her friends that Doménica was arrested. Heriberto tells Conchita that he will do whatever it takes to get Guadalupe to agree to be his wife. Jesús leaves the hospital ready to look for Mariluz. Damián proposes to Doménica to take off the tracker to escape and asks her to trust him. Augusto threatens Jesús and asks him to take him to where his daughter is. Jesús sets a trap for Iker in order to stop him and informs Augusto. Doménica reveals to her family that Damián is her boyfriend. Elisa advises Mariluz to fight for Jesús' love.
41	"Cásate conmigo"	23 May 2022
Augusto is afraid that Iker will reveal everything he knows about his business. Carlota asks Jesús to go to the farm. Selena becomes an accomplice of Federico and Augusto. Guadalupe arrives at Augusto's farm looking for Mariluz, but she does not want to see her mother. Doménica rejects Damián and assures him that she is not yet ready to give herself to him. Samuel proposes to Selena. Carlota and Jesús arrive at the farm.
42	"Hasta el fin del mundo"	24 May 2022
Mariluz sees that Jesús has arrived with Carlota at the farm and decides to return home. Selena assures Samuel that she is not ready for the engagement and instead asks Samuel to be her boyfriend. Carlota faints. Victoriana finds Damián in Doménica's bedroom. Jesús goes in search of Mariluz. Mariluz remembers the day she left the farm and could not say goodbye to Lisardo. Jesús manages to catch Mariluz's bus and assures her that he will always be the love of her life. Carlota believes she is pregnant.
43	"¡Es mi hijo!"	25 May 2022
Mariluz returns home and Guadalupe asks her not to suffer for any man. Mariluz believes that Guadalupe kicked her father out of the house. Doménica arrives at the Guerrero house to say goodbye to Damián, but meets Samuel who consoles her. Elisa returns to the farm to see her son Lisardo. Damián asks Doménica to stay with them. Elisa is disappointed to learn that the man dating Carlota is not her son. Conchita reveals to Mariluz that Celestino stole from them. Emma is sure that Rodrigo spiked her drink. Guadalupe wants to confess to Mariluz the whole truth about her father.
44	"Mordiste la mano que te dio de comer"	26 May 2022
Heriberto informs Guadalupe that Victoriana signed the documents for the reopening of her shop. Jesús with the help of his brothers enter the warehouse where Augusto has the contaminated milk. Mariluz passes her exam with honors. Augusto subdues Iker and warns him that he does not want to see him near his daughter. Rodrigo falls into Emma's trap. Jesús records Augusto's threats against Iker and Augusto ends Iker's life. Doménica gives herself to Damián.
45	"El plan se terminó"	27 May 2022
Carlota is upset to see Jesús with Mariluz and vows revenge. Jesús tries to clarify to Mariluz the incident of having slept with Carlota but she does not believe him. Invited by Mariluz, Augusto attends the party and gets jealous when he sees Guadalupe with Heriberto. Augusto sees Damián and Doménica arrive and asks to talk things over with his daughter. Damián tells Jesús of his decision to pull out of the plan, as he is not willing to leave Doménica's side. Augusto and Doménica negotiate her returning home. Despite having supported them earlier, Conchita demands that Jesús leave Mariluz alone. Victoriana is determined to recover her family's inheritance, of which Augusto is the executor.
46	"¡Tenemos al culpable!"	30 May 2022
Victoriana learns that Mariluz was at her farm for a few days. Doménica arrives to live at Guadalupe's house. Damián is sure that the search of his house is Augusto's business because he wants to separate him from Doménica. Rodrigo confesses to Emma that he did put a substance in his drink on the day of the party. Samuel impersonates Damián and is arrested for the murder of Iker Fonseca. Doménica believes that her father hurt Iker. Mariluz is convinced that Carlota was the one who made the attack on the day of her party. Jesús wants to prove that the real murderer of Iker is Augusto.
47	"Lo mejor es terminar"	31 May 2022
Victoriana asks Emma to erase Rodrigo's statement since the only thing it is causing is that she is on everyone's lips. Jesús assures the authorities that the gun they found in his house did not belong to his brother. Elisa is willing to appear at the art school exhibition. Conchita assures Augusto that her daughter Carlota made an attempt against her family. Jesús decides to break up with Carlota. Carlota suffers a crisis, Jesús takes her home and Augusto confirms that his daughter suffers from anxiety.
48	"Vengo a entregarme"	1 June 2022
Jesús confesses to Abel that he may be close to finding his mother. Damián turns himself in to the authorities. Renata and Rodrigo join forces against Emma. Carlota looks for Jesús in the mechanic's shop and when she sees his cell phone, she decides to take it. Emma puts a stop to Rodrigo. Victoriana blows up Guadalupe's house and Doménica pays the consequences.
49	"Atravesar las llamas"	2 June 2022
Mariluz sees the explosion in her house and decides to go in to rescue Doménica. Victoriana finds out that Mariluz was the one who saved Doménica’s life. Guadalupe refuses to leave her house, Augusto tries to convince her to accept his help. Damián's legal situation becomes complicated. Augusto wants end Elisa, she is not afraid of him and is willing to confront him. Damián visits Doménica and breaks up with her.
50	"La vida me restriega mis errores"	3 June 2022
Heriberto informs Guadalupe that the explosion at her house was provoked, Mariluz is convinced that the culprit is Carlota and confronts her. Damián believes that his brother's plan is failing and tells him that he does not intend to hurt Doménica. Carlota confronts Victoriana and assures her that she is tired of being blamed, Victoriana reacts by slapping her. Augusto confesses to Guadalupe that he regrets having chosen Victoriana as his partner and kisses her. Augusto is convinced that the Sánchez brothers destroyed the milk lot.
51	"Cortar la hierba mala desde la raíz"	6 June 2022
During his visit to Michoacán in search of clues to find his mother, Damián is reunited with her. Mariluz arrives at Jesús' house and finds his diary and reads it. Augusto comes face to face with Elisa again, and she assures Augusto that he ruined her life because she could not be with Octavio in his last moments, much less see her children grow up.
52	"Tú y yo solo somos uno"	7 June 2022
Damián prevents Augusto from hurting Elisa, she discovers that the person who made the complaint was Lisardo Sánchez and is determined to find her son. Damián seeks to find his mother's whereabouts. Jesús asks Mariluz not to trust Augusto. Mariluz and Jesús exchange their vows of love. Damián manages to wake up Doménica with a kiss. Damián asks Samuel not to mess with Doménica. Conchita finds a photo of Elisa with Augusto, and when he sees it, he confesses to Jesús that Elisa and her sons are his worst enemies. Heriberto proposes marriage to Guadalupe.
53	"Tomar cartas en el asunto"	8 June 2022
Samuel receives a proposal to become a wrestler. Guadalupe refuses to share her life with Heriberto. Augusto makes it clear to Elisa that he will not allow her sons to end him. Victoriana is determined to leave Augusto as long as she has the documents of her inheritance in her hands. Jesús tells Mariluz that he broke into Augusto's office, she gets upset, but he asks her to help him get out of the mansion. Doménica makes confessions to Samuel.
54	"Jesús no va a lastimarme"	9 June 2022
Guadalupe warns Victoriana that she has no interest in Augusto. Damián and his brothers seek to take revenge for Valero's mistake with them. Adrián meets Laura when he discovers that she stayed at the school he wanted. Victoriana tries to bribe Olivia. Augusto is reunited with Briana, Doménica's friend. Guadalupe rejects that Mariluz and Jesús have gotten back together. Elisa arrives to ask for a job at her son's mechanic shop. Emma becomes jealous when she meets Laura.
55	"¿Aceptas ser mi esposa?"	10 June 2022
Mariluz learns that Heriberto proposed to her mother. Conchita asks Guadalupe to give Heriberto a chance. Damián finds Augusto with Briana and prevents Doménica from becoming disillusioned with her father. Guadalupe refuses to let Mariluz work with Augusto. Jesús meets Mariluz at a hotel and confesses that he wants to be with her forever, so he proposes to her.
56	"Esos mecánicos son mis hijos"	13 June 2022
Samuel and Doménica prepare all the details of the orchard, Selena gets jealous when she sees them together and ruins the project. Mariluz and Jesús make love and he promises her that he will formally ask for her hand. Guadalupe finds out that Mariluz has gone to Puebla with Augusto and Jesús and is determined to go find her, but Conchita stops her. Samuel complains to Selena about her jealousy. Carlota waits for Jesús to take a pregnancy test. Doménica believes that Damián is unfaithful. Carlota questions Mariluz about what happened in Puebla with Jesús. Elisa confirms that the Guerreros are her sons.
57	"Vamos a tener un bebé"	14 June 2022
Mica confirms that Mariluz is Augusto's daughter. Augusto asks Jesús to reconsider getting back together with Carlota. Doménica surprises Damián in the workshop and notices that he is hiding something. Jesús informs his brothers that he is going to marry Mariluz, Damián gets upset with him as their whole plan will be destroyed. Mariluz informs her family that she is going home with Jesús. Carlota shows a pregnancy test to Jesús and confirms that they will become parents. Elisa is saddened to learn that the Guerrero brothers are four, not three like her children.
58	"Ya no nos vamos a casar"	15 June 2022
Emma arrives at Adrián's house and finds him kissing Laura. Damián finds Briana with a politician. Carlota informs Augusto and Victoriana that she is expecting Jesús' child. Jesús reveals to Mariluz that Carlota is expecting his child. Elisa receives a message from Augusto and falls into his trap, but the Guerrero brothers manage to infiltrate the warehouse and help Elisa escape.
59	"El dolor que siento"	16 June 2022
Jesús reveals to his brothers that his plans to marry Mariluz were canceled because of Carlota's pregnancy. Doménica discovers that Damián was with Briana. Mariluz overhears the wedding plans between Carlota and Jesús. Damián reveals to his brother that he found Briana making out with the congressman. Augusto remembers the night he forced Victoriana's father to give him the inheritance and Elisa witnessed everything. Samuel decides to try his luck in wrestling. Jesús calls Mariluz to apologize and she asks him not to look for her anymore.
60	"¿Dónde están mis hijos?"	17 June 2022
Conchita tells Heriberto the whole story between Guadalupe and Augusto, so Heriberto decides to look for Augusto and put a stop to his plans. Laura wants to apologize to Emma for the misunderstanding. Carlota is worried because she does not know Jesús' family and her wedding is on the horizon. Despite his refusal, Carlota takes advantage of Jesus' distraction to obtain his identification. Damián confesses to Doménica that the woman he is looking for is his mother. Mariluz's excellent work provokes Augusto to offer his support to her and her mother. Jesús is visiting the cemetery and Elisa suddenly appears.
61	"Tenerle miedo al amor"	20 June 2022
Adrián discovers that Emma took his cell phone and decides to break up with her. Samuel enters the ring for his first professional fight as Captain Justice. Doménica apologizes to Damián for believing he was unfaithful. To avoid being discovered, Jesús plans to find his old friend to help him with his documents. Doménica arrives at the same restaurant where her friend Briana is and discovers that she is her father's mistress. Heriberto decides to stay away from Guadalupe's life. The Guerrero brothers find out more about their mother.
62	"Medidas extremas"	21 June 2022
Jesús convinces Carlota that he will take care of all the paperwork for their wedding so that he will not be discovered. Doménica realizes that in reality Patricio is Briana's partner. Augusto receives a mysterious call where he is threatened. Carlota makes a scene with Jesús because she doesn't like to see him near Mariluz. Adrián discovers that his mother was abused by the dark man. Carlota accuses Doménica and Mariluz of wanting to steal her baby.
63	"¡Vamos a explotar!"	22 June 2022
Mariluz arrives at Jesús' workshop and finds him with a toy that reminds her of Lisardo, her childhood sweetheart. Carlota plans to take revenge on Mariluz. Conchita thinks it is best for Heriberto to fight for Guadalupe's love. Damián discovers that the car that Doménica plans to drive has a bomb so he asks her not to move as it could be very dangerous. The police manage to defuse the bomb, Domenica thanks Samuel for saving her life. Augusto becomes jealous when he sees the detail that Heriberto had with Guadalupe.
64	"Amor guardado, amor cancelado"	23 June 2022
Mariluz is ready to start a new life. Jesús does not want to reveal his past to his siblings. Doménica asks her father to reinforce her security. Rodrigo offers Emma some alcohol inside the school. Elisa starts looking for her son in Morelia and discovers that they were in the same place. Jesús and Carlota listen to their baby's heart. Heriberto surprises Guadalupe with a romantic dinner, she apologizes for the way she has behaved and he kisses her. Briana surprises Samuel in the workshop to give him a kiss, but Selena arrives and puts her in her place.
65	"Emma pierde la vista"	24 June 2022
Guadalupe agrees to be Heriberto's girlfriend. Adrián takes Emma home and she is worried because she cannot see. The doctor informs Victoriana that Emma's loss of sight is temporary. Adrián plans to take revenge on the man who destroyed his mother's life. Mariluz receives a message from Lisardo. Damián returns to the hotel where his mother stayed. Mariluz receives a message that fits Lisardo's description.
66	"Mariluz le confiesa a Carlota su amor por Jesús"	27 June 2022
Mariluz receives a message from Lisardo who is willing to meet her again. Augusto sets a trap for Heriberto. Carlota believes that Jesús is not interested in their wedding. Elisa crosses paths with Damián but they do not recognize each other. Mariluz assures Carlota that Jesús' heart belongs to her because he loves her. Heriberto receives a letter informing him that he has plants illegally. Elisa manages to enter Augusto's house. Victoriana assures Jesús that Mariluz hit Carlota.
67	"Amor encerrado, amor olvidado"	28 June 2022
Samuel obtains important information from Augusto during his date with Briana. Carlota mocks Emma's blindness. Elisa manages to place the microphone in Augusto's office and Heriberto's nursery is shut down. Mariluz is ready to meet Lisardo again, but Doménica does not let her go alone and when they arrive they are almost kidnapped. Augusto plans to use Mariluz to find Elisa's sons. Damián makes a promise to Doménica. Micaela tries to convince Guadalupe to confess to Mariluz that Augusto is her father, but they overhear a conversation that makes them confirm that Augusto is not a good person.
68	"Una propuesta forzada y por compromiso"	29 June 2022
Carlota wants Mariluz to come to her wedding so she sends her the invitation. Augusto is upset to know that Federico didn't tell him about the son he had with Amanda. Victoriana doesn't want Jesús to live in her house. Victoriana humiliates Belen just for being from the orphanage. Jesús gives the engagement ring to Carlota. Samuel starts receiving money as a wrestler. Elisa is convinced that Jesús is not her son because he is a man who is easily manipulated, unlike Lisardo. Carlota has a hallucination and destroys her wedding dress.
69	"Adiós mi amor, adiós Mariluz"	30 June 2022
Federico assures Augusto that Elisa was in his office, Victoriana believes she is his lover. Heriberto invites Mariluz to join his work team. Emma begins to recover her sight. Damián and Samuel make Jesús believe that they organized a bachelor party for him, but it is really a dinner with Mariluz. Elisa plans to arrive at Carlota's wedding. Mariluz returns the engagement ring that Jesús gave her. Adrián no longer wants to know anything about his father. Briana, feeling interrogated by Samuel, confronts him.
70	"Que hable ahora o calle para siempre"	1 July 2022
Mariluz manages to communicate with Lisardo. Elisa manages to forge the invitation to Carlota's wedding with Jesús. Augusto asks Doménica to inform him everything that Mariluz tells her about Lisardo. Briana arrives on Patricio's arm at Carlota's wedding. Mariluz gives Patricio some documents to sign, but an accident occurs at the ceremony. Jesús hesitates to marry Carlota. Elisa arrives at Carlota's wedding.
71	"Un golpe al corazón"	4 July 2022
Jesús agrees to marry Carlota, breaking Mariluz's heart. Elisa confronts Augusto and Victoriana believes that her husband invited his mistress to her daughter's wedding. Briana and Federico suspect that the Guerreros brothers are very interested in Augusto's business. Victoriana advises Carlota to do whatever it takes not to let Jesús go. Damián and Samuel realize that Federico could cause a lot of trouble for their brother Jesús. Mariluz contacts Lisardo again and learns that he lives in France.
72	"El inicio de una gran amistad"	5 July 2022
Selena discovers that Briana was with Samuel. Augusto does not understand Victoriana's attacks on Emma. Carlota feels Jesús' rejection on her wedding night. Patricio arrives at Mariluz's house to talk business, but he begins to have feelings for her. Carlota asks Jesús to give her a chance to win his love. Augusto receives an anonymous letter and believes it was sent by Elisa. Doménica questions Augusto about the arrival of the mystery woman at Carlota's wedding.
73	"Necesito quitarte de en medio"	6 July 2022
Augusto sends a message to Elisa making it clear that her children hate her after discovering that she is a murderer. Victoriana finds some bottles in Emma's backpack and decides to send her to the farm indefinitely. Carlota puts a substance in Mariluz's drink to get her out of her way so she can be happy with Jesús. Damián feels very sad about the news his brother gave him and seeks comfort from Doménica. Elisa reveals to Santiago that Augusto was the murderer of Victoriana's father. Carlota, seeing Mariluz in such a bad state, decides to throw her into the pool, but Jesús manages to save her life. Victoriana knows that Carlota was to blame for what happened to Mariluz and puts a stop to it.
74	"Fuera de peligro"	7 July 2022
Samuel, seeing Selena with her jealousy, decides to break up with her and also to stay away from Briana. Carlota prevents Jesús from suspecting that she was to blame for Mariluz's accident. Jesús visits Mariluz in the hospital and assures her that he will always be by her side. Augusto asks Guadalupe not to lie to his daughter about her father's true identity. Guadalupe tells Jesús to leave the hospital and to stay away from her daughter. Doménica discovers that Briana is her father's lover.
75	"Un corazón despechado"	8 July 2022
Doménica finds out that Briana is her father's mistress and slaps him. Carlota begs Jesús to sleep with her. Augusto ends his affair with Briana. Doménica consoles her mother after she finds her drinking. Augusto accepts that he made a mistake when he had an affair with Briana, Doménica asks him to confess the truth to her mother. Jesús, Damián and Samuel celebrate that Augusto's cars are not going to win the race. Doménica discovers that Damián already knew about her father's relationship with Briana and kicks him out of the house. Guadalupe believes that Mariluz is becoming obsessed with Lisardo.
76	"Enlodar mi nombre"	11 July 2022
Augusto confirms that Carlota was not to blame for Mariluz's accident. Heriberto asks Augusto to become a partner in his business, but he refuses. Patricio learns that Mariluz is in the hospital and decides to surprise her with a bouquet of flowers. Elisa and Guadalupe see each other at the church and Elisa is afraid that she will recognize her. Augusto discovers that thanks to the fact that the car parts Federico got are stolen, a report was filed and he will not be able to participate. Emma returns home to try to reconcile with her mother but Victoriana does not respond as expected.
77	"Jesús y Carlota conocen a su bebé"	12 July 2022
Augusto believes that Federico betrayed him and kicks him out of the house. Doménica tells her father what is happening with her sister Emma and he assures her that he will not allow any of his daughters to have an addiction. Samuel tries to convince Doménica to give Damián another chance, but she refuses; however, Damián sees them and believes that his brother is taking advantage of the situation to go out with her. Federico wants revenge on the Guerrero brothers. Jesús and Carlota listen to their baby's heartbeat. Damián is reunited with Elisa and helps her change her name.
78	"Mariluz se está ganando mi corazón"	13 July 2022
Jesús questions Patricio about his intentions with Mariluz. Victoriana wants to divorce Augusto. Mariluz wants to contact Lisardo by video call, but when she sees that he does not connect, she is disappointed. Emma discovers that her father is with Briana. Augusto asks Jesús to get Federico out of his way. Victoriana kicks out Guadalupe and her family from her house. Patricio confesses his feelings to Mariluz.
79	"Más cerca del objetivo"	14 July 2022
Jesús confesses to Abel that he is close to gaining Augusto's trust. Heriberto tries to mediate the fight between Guadalupe and Victoriana. Abel asks Jesús to let Mariluz be happy. Victoriana refuses to leave her house until Augusto gives back her inheritance. Elisa learns that her enemy's candidacy is in danger. Guadalupe promises to keep peace with Victoriana until Doménica and Emma manage to talk to their father. Victoriana continues to blame Guadalupe for stealing Augusto's love, she offers her a glass of tequila to calm her down. Federico threatens Abel. Patricio kisses Mariluz.
80	"El desastre que provocaste"	15 July 2022
Augusto tells Patricio that he was Briana's lover since he is a human being and can make mistakes. Emma comments to Doménica that she heard Damián say that he is interested in a woman named Frida. Doménica asks Samuel for a chance and kisses him. Victoriana and Guadalupe talk about their feelings for Augusto. Jesús disguises himself so he can talk to Mariluz. Augusto looks for Victoriana to ask her to go back to the house.
81	"Pelea a muerte"	18 July 2022
Jesús assures Carlota that he disguised himself in order to help her father and prove that neither are responsible for the stolen auto parts. Victoriana forgets what happened the night before and rejects that Guadalupe is her friend. Carlota tries to open Mariluz's computer, but is caught by Conchita. Augusto tells Victoriana to return to the house, but when she refuses, he blackmails her with a large sum of money. Damián suggests to Jesús to stop the plan against Augusto. Samuel informs his brothers that he is determined to leave with Briana. Doménica tells Damián that she has already met the woman who drives him crazy. Samuel wrestles 'El Mamut González'.
82	"¡Los van a matar!"	19 July 2022
Samuel tries to help Damián get back together with Doménica. Carlota learns that Mariluz has already reunited with her old childhood sweetheart. Victoriana receives bad news about her inheritance. Federico discovers that Augusto has taken over his father's company and confronts him. Rodrigo hurts Emma again. Augusto has Briana killed no matter who is accompanying her. Carlota is sure that Jesus is secretly writing to Mariluz, but discovers a secret. Augusto returns to find Victoriana and assures her that she is the only woman he wants to spend the rest of his life with, she agrees to return to the house, but first he has a confrontation with Guadalupe. Augusto endangers the lives of Samuel and Briana.
83	"El destino nos quiere juntos"	20 July 2022
Jesús manages to revive Briana and Damián informs him that it was Augusto who tried to hurt her. Carlota has a hallucination and almost suffers an accident. Emma starts taking self-defense classes. Mariluz is determined to travel to France to reunite with Lisardo. Jesús shares with Augusto that Carlota is acting as if she is being chased by a ghost, Damián sees Frida again and assures her that destiny wants them together. Heriberto announces at the businessmen's meeting that Guadalupe will become his wife. Carlota asks Jesús for an explanation about 'Lisardo'.
84	"Está todo podrido"	21 July 2022
Jesús and his brothers learn that their mother ran away with her lover, they are disappointed in her. Augusto hits Damián and kicks him out of the house. Doménica asks Briana to confirm if her father threatened her, she denies it. Federico informs Victoriana that he found a document which could be the power of attorney that her father signed. Augusto looks for Guadalupe to confront her about her engagement to Heriberto, she assures him that she no longer cares about him. Federico blackmails Carlota and threatens to tell the truth about her son's father if she refuses to give him a large sum of money. Guadalupe prepares a surprise party for Mariluz.
85	"¡Los Guerrero son mis hijos!"	22 July 2022
Carlota remembers that it is Mariluz's birthday and decides to go to her party to ruin it. Damián tells Frida about his mother. Rodrigo plans to get revenge on Emma for the humiliation she put him through, but things don't go his way and he causes an accident to Adrián's friend. Guadalupe and Micaela resume their friendship. Guadalupe, Conchita and Heriberto give Mariluz a plane ticket so that she can travel to Paris and be reunited with Lisardo. Carlota falls into Federico's trap. Elisa confirms that the Guerreros are her sons.
86	"Las noches de tortura se terminaron"	25 July 2022
Elisa is willing to keep her secret until she proves her innocence because she cannot bear the rejection of her children. Jesús learns that Mariluz will travel to Paris to be reunited with Lisardo. Federico wins Carlota's trust by defending her against the extortionists. Mariluz prepares to travel to Paris to be reunited with Lisardo, but Jesús will try to prevent her from discovering his lie. Federico meets with Victoriana to give her the power of attorney signed by her father. Damián begins to question Frida about her private life, she assures him that she does not like to talk about it. Mariluz communicates again with Lisardo and he tells her that he will have to take a trip out of Paris, so it will no longer be possible for them to see each other.
87	"La estoy perdiendo"	26 July 2022
Victoriana surprises Augusto with a romantic evening to pressure him into giving her the money; however, she realizes that he only tricked her. Emma asks her father for help, but he refuses. Federico gives Victoriana the power of attorney that her father signed, but in exchange he asks her to convince Augusto to accept him back in his work team. Samuel declares his love for Doménica. Victoriana proves that Augusto forged her father's signature. Damián believes that Doménica changed him for Samuel. Victoriana confronts Augusto about the fraud he committed. Carlota gives the money to Federico. Doménica asks Jesús to accept that he lost Mariluz.
88	"La odio"	27 July 2022
Emma informs Adrián that the insurance will not be able to cover the cost of the prosthesis his friend needs. Federico tries to trick the extortionists. Augusto asks Jesús to forbid Damián to approach Doménica. Damián confronts Samuel about the sign he wrote at school. Rodrigo plans to blame Adrian for theft, but Emma manages to record him and threatens to publish the video if he refuses to withdraw the complaint. Damián assures Samuel that he renounces his love for Doménica, so he asks him to make her happy. Mariluz decides to travel to Tijuana because she is sure she will be reunited with Lisardo. Damián blames his mother for all his misfortunes, she listens to him and suffers.
89	"Mi corazón no te ha olvidado"	28 July 2022
Augusto asks Federico to take care of Damián. Rodrigo withdraws the complaint against Adrián. Elisa prevents Damián from asking her any more questions. Augusto sends Jesús to Tijuana in search of Lisardo. Federico complains to Carlota for giving false money to the extortionists. Adrián surprises Emma while she is taking a bath. Mariluz is reunited with Lisardo in Tijuana and they kiss. Augusto contacts Jesús and assures him that he sent some men to arrest Lisardo.
90	"Lo único que me da vida eres tú"	29 July 2022
Adrián thinks Emma's teacher is flirting with her and hits him. Augusto learns that Lisardo Sanchez ran away from Jesús. Santiago finds the body of a man buried on Augusto's farm. Modesta agrees to help Elisa discover the truth. Doménica receives some photographs showing Damián sleeping with another woman. Elisa begins to look for Victoriano's box. Jesús tells Mariluz that he wants to be with her always and sleep together. Elisa arrives at Guadalupe's house and Conchita recognizes her.
91	"Desenterrar el pasado"	1 August 2022
Elisa confesses to Conchita and Guadalupe that she had to leave her family because she witnessed a crime. Conchita reveals that the box she is looking for is in Victoriana's safekeeping. Carlota learns that Jesús is in Tijuana and Augusto promises her daughter a trip with her husband. Mariluz assures Jesús that they should not have been together. Emma tries to help Renata. Modesta informs Augusto that there are some policemen with a warrant to investigate the body that is buried at the farm, he suffers a heart attack. Carlota demands that Jesús make love to her. Samuel surprises Doménica with a romantic evening.
92	"Ya no quiero vivir"	2 August 2022
Doménica rejects Samuel's love. Damián finds some photographs of him with another woman, so he confronts Federico. Elisa insists on looking for Victoriana, she contacts her and lets her know that she was a witness to her father's murder. Damián assures Doménica that it was Federico who set him up on Augusto's orders. Carlota confirms that Jesús traveled with Mariluz. Federico seeks revenge against the Guerreros. Mariluz accepts to be Patricio's girlfriend. Carlota, feeling lonely and rejected by Jesús, decides to kill herself. Augusto warns Carlota that she must be committed again.
93	"Estoy decidido a recuperarte"	3 August 2022
Samuel gives up the search for Selena. Abel asks Guadalupe and Mariluz for Conchita's hand and they inform them that they are getting married in the next few days. Valero is arrested. Abel receives a call from Heriberto and assures him that someone is holding up his work. Augusto swears to Guadalupe that he will do everything in his power to win her back. Elisa confesses to Victoriana that all the evidence she is looking for is in the box. Augusto thinks he has found Elisa, but something surprises him.
94	"Los malos van ganando"	4 August 2022
Victoriana shoots who she thinks is Elisa, but Augusto discovers that she has deceived them again. Elisa has in her hands the box that holds the truth. Augusto makes Victoriana believe that she killed the man she shot at. Elisa is worried as she has no sign of Santiago, but Federico gets rid of him. Augusto discovers that Victoriana is going behind his back. Guadalupe agrees to marry Heriberto. Victoriana and Federico are photographed kissing.
95	"¡Boda por partida doble!"	5 August 2022
Guadalupe is not sure about marrying Heriberto, Augusto looks for her and proves to her that Victoriana is cheating on him. Augusto confronts Federico when he discovers that he is Victoriana's lover and asks him to continue their relationship because he wants to know her plans. Jesús asks his brothers not to judge their mother. Elisa discovers Victoriana's father's secret. Conchita and Abel are declared husband and wife. Augusto prevents Guadalupe from marrying Heriberto.
96	"Nuestro futuro está en tus manos"	8 August 2022
Victoriana learns that Augusto kidnapped Guadalupe on her wedding day, so she reveals to Heriberto that Guadalupe had a daughter with Augusto. Augusto reiterates to Guadalupe that his happiness depends on her and asks for a chance. Jesús learns the truth about Carlota's illness. Conchita confirms to Heriberto that Mariluz is indeed Augusto's daughter. Guadalupe agrees to stay with Augusto. Jesús reveals to Mariluz about Carlota's illness and is willing to separate from her when her baby is born.
97	"Yo soy su madre"	9 August 2022
Guadalupe feels sorry for Heriberto. Damián confronts Jesús with a photograph of his past, he confesses the truth. Guadalupe decides to start a new life with Augusto, both are carried away by passion. Elisa meets with the Guerreros in front of Octavio's grave and confesses to them that she is their mother.
98	"Van a ser mis bebés por siempre"	10 August 2022
Jesús begs Elisa to go live with them because she is in danger if Augusto finds her. Federico discovers that Elisa's sons are the Guerreros. Elisa is happy to regain the love of her sons. Guadalupe regrets having slept with Augusto. Augusto gives the order not to let Guadalupe leave the farm. Federico discovers that he has a son named Adrián. Victoriana arrives at the farm to complain to Guadalupe for having spent the night with Augusto.
99	"Me voy a volver loca de verdad"	11 August 2022
Guadalupe assures Victoriana that Augusto kidnaped her on her wedding day. Jesús warns Augusto that when his son is born he will take him away. Patricio proposes to Mariluz to get away from everyone and go live in the north of the country now that he has a better job offer. Doménica makes a scene with Damián after discovering that a woman is living with them. Victoriana threatens Augusto with making his affair with Guadalupe public and ruining his political campaign.
100	"Un veneno que nos puede destruir"	12 August 2022
Mariluz questions her mother if she is responsible for destroying Augusto's marriage. Carlota asks Federico for help with her plan for revenge. Adrián meets Elisa. Carlota makes a fuss at Mariluz's house to warn her to stay away from Jesús or she will pay the consequences. Mariluz demands Augusto to let her mother be happy. Elisa, in order not to be discovered, pretends to be Elías, Jesús, Damián and Samuel's uncle. Federico gives a vial of poison to Carlota.
101	"¡Aléjate de mi hija!"	15 August 2022
Damián tells Doménica that his friend the painter is her mother. Jesús surprises Carlota with some gifts for her and her baby. Federico realizes that the Guerrero brothers are Octavio Sánchez's sons. Guadalupe assures Augusto that she does not intend to be his mistress. Victoriana wants a divorce and Federico wants to get his father's company back so he makes a deal with Augusto. Conchita, seeing that her daughter is suffering because of Augusto's love, decides to talk to him and demands that he stay away from Guadalupe. Samuel fears that Doménica will discover that he is a wrestler. Abel surprises Conchita with a trip to celebrate their honeymoon.
102	"Una oportunidad de olvidarte"	16 August 2022
Mariluz informs her mother and grandmother that she plans to leave with Patricio now that he has been offered a job in the interior of the Republic. Patricio looks for Jesús and demands that he stay away from Mariluz because he will not allow him to take her away from him. Captain Justice, Samuel’s wrestling character, dedicates his triumph to Doménica. Doménica visits Captain Justice to make a request in favor of the children of the orphanage, he takes advantage of the moment to ask her out. Elisa finds a key to prove the truth behind Victoriano's death. Mariluz doubts if she wants to make the trip with Patricio.
103	"Carlota, ¿qué me hiciste?"	17 August 2022
Guadalupe confesses to Mica what happened between her and Augusto the day he kidnaped her on horseback. Federico informs his uncle that the other handwriting expert will give the opinion he requests. Carlota confirms that Jesús does not love her and decides to poison him. Adrián becomes the best student of his class. Doménica confirms that Captain Justice is Samuel. Samuel proposes to Doménica, she rejects the engagement ring and assures him that she still loves Damián. Elisa informs her children that Jesús' life is in danger.
104	"Que su corazón no deje de latir"	18 August 2022
Renata organizes a surprise party for Emma. Carlota suffers a crisis when she learns that Jesús is on the verge of death, Augusto thinks it is best for her to be hospitalized. Doménica is determined to go for Mariluz to the airport to inform her what is happening to Jesús, he goes into cardiac arrest and begins to remember the moments that marked his life. Patricio accepts that he lied to Mariluz, she breaks up with him. Elisa prays for her son's health. Carlota begins to have hallucinations.
105	"Ojalá tu amor lo traiga de regreso"	19 August 2022
Victoriana tries to end Emma's party, Emma tries to stop her but ends up hurt. Mariluz enters Jesús' room and is surprised to find Elisa, who tells her that she is his mother. Mariluz understands Jesús' secret and agrees to wait for him as long as necessary, when he wakes up, she calls him Lisardo.
106	"Gracias de corazón"	22 August 2022
Heriberto receives a call from someone offering the evidence to end Augusto. Heriberto asks for the support of Abel, who is discovered by Augusto and sends his men to kidnap him. With the help of a patient, Carlota manages to escape from the clinic to see Jesús but finds him with Mariluz. Thanks to Elisa's cybernetic skills, she manages to send the evidence of Augusto's embezzlement directly to Doménica's computer. Carlota manipulates Mariluz's truck to cause an accident without knowing that it is Abel who would suffer the consequences of her actions, affecting Augusto's intentions with him.
107	"Descansa en paz, Don Abel"	23 August 2022
Knowing that he is close to death, Abel asks the Guerrero family to stop fighting against Augusto to focus on their happiness. Conchita catches a glimpse of Abel in the hospital, he says goodbye and dies in her arms. Conchita overhears the Guerrro's blaming Augusto for Abel's death and is disappointed in Augusto. With the help of a patient, Carlota escapes again from the clinic to kill Mariluz.
108	"Daño irreversible"	24 August 2022
Doménica enters Augusto's computer to understand the files sent and discovers Augusto's frauds and Victoriana's affair with Federico. Emma organizes a plan to unmask Rodrigo as the abuser. Mariluz gives Guadalupe Heriberto's goodbye letter so that she can organize her heart and mind. Doménica says goodbye to pursue her dream of becoming a flight attendant. Damián says goodbye to travel and clear his mind.
109	"Salva a mi hijo"	25 August 2022
Carlota believes she has spent her pregnancy locked up in solitude; the doctor tells her that she has received constant visits from Jesus while she sleeps. Victoriana finds Augusto hugging Guadalupe. Carlota suffers an accident, causing her to go into labor early. Emma tries to trick Victoriana into going to an Alcoholics Anonymous meeting, when she realizes it she slaps her, Mica tries to separate them but also ends up slapped. Jesús' baby is born very delicate and does not survive. Mariluz discovers that she is pregnant. Jesús says goodbye to his son and Augusto agrees with the doctor that it is best that Carlota does not find out, however, Victoriana tells her the truth.
110	"Mariluz está en peligro"	26 August 2022
Doménica arrives home as Victoriana and Federico discuss Carlota's deception of Jesús and confronts them. Upset by her lie, Jesús asks Carlota to see his lawyer to end their marriage. With the help of her partner, Carlota confronts and puts Mariluz to sleep in order to kidnap her. Disguising her voice, Elisa offers Victoriana the evidence to imprison Augusto.
111	"El tiempo es crucial"	29 August 2022
Carlota enjoys watching Mariluz suffer, she asks her to leave her alone, but Carlota injects her with a sedative. Selena does not accept Doménica's help. Lucas reveals to Jesús the place where Carlota has Mariluz. Emma faints during dance rehearsals. Jesús holds Carlota responsible if something bad happens to Mariluz and assures her that he will denounce her for attempted murder. Lucas reveals that Carlota had Abel killed. After saving Samuel, Selena dies in his arms. Jesús learns that Mariluz is expecting his child.
112	"Augusto está detenido"	30 August 2022
Mariluz receives good news about her baby. Jesús asks his siblings to keep the secret about Adrián's real father. Elisa manages to enter the tomb where Victoriana's father's remains lie. Rodrigo tries to hurt Emma. Doménica gives Damian another chance. Carlota starts a fire in the clinic where she is hospitalized. Augusto is arrested. Damián congratulates his mother because her plan went perfectly. Doménica learns that a person died in the fire at the clinic where Carlota is hospitalized. Victoriana informs Augusto that she reported him to the police and gives him 24 hours to return her fortune.
113	"A quien a hierro mata, a hierro muere"	31 August 2022
Federico informs Augusto that he will be transferred to the prison. Jesús shares with his brothers that Carlota had a strange relationship with fire. Carlota hides in the cellar of her house. Elisa asks her children to read the letter proving her innocence. Doménica informs her father that Carlota died in the clinic fire and he blames Jesús. Augusto is beaten by his cellmates, El Pacho offers him protection. Samuel meets Viviana. Emma faints and Victoriana thinks her daughter is faking. Jesús meets with Mariluz in a church to marry her, but she rejects him.
114	"El tiempo perdido hasta los santos lo lloran"	1 September 2022
Guadalupe visits Augusto in jail and he reiterates his love to the point of proposing marriage. Renata confesses to Emma that she stole her insulin case. Augusto plans to take revenge on Federico. Talking with El Pacho, Augusto realizes that they have a common enemy, Lisardo Sanchez. Conchita is sure that Carlota is alive. Victoriana gives the power of attorney to Augusto, he asks her for a divorce. Elisa files a complaint against Augusto for murder. Adrián discovers that Federico is his father. Victoriana discovers that Augusto kept part of her inheritance to give to Guadalupe.
115	"Tú eres la hija de Augusto Ruiz-Montalvo"	2 September 2022
Victoriana warns Augusto that she will not allow him to take her money to give it to Guadalupe. Conchita dies in Guadalupe and Mariluz's arms. Damián informs Jesús that Augusto is out of jail, so Elisa is in danger. Augusto learns of Conchita's death. Victoriana arrives at Conchita's wake to reveal to Mariluz that she is Augusto's daughter. Elisa is kidnapped and confronts Augusto.
116	"Que esta guerra termine"	5 September 2022
Elisa learns that Augusto ended Santiago's life, he proposes a deal, but she distrusts his word. Mariluz refuses to forgive her mother for hiding her father's identity from her. Victoriana suffers from alcohol poisoning. Augusto manages to escape and Jesús assures his mother that since they do not have enough evidence, they cannot arrest Augusto. Samuel gives Viviana a romantic date. Augusto arrives to say goodbye to Conchita. Damián learns that Mariluz is Doménica's half-sister. Augusto discovers that Mariluz is his daughter.
117	"El llamado de la sangre"	6 September 2022
Mariluz reproaches her mother for hiding the truth about her father. Elisa learns that Samuel is a wrestler. Mariluz agrees to move to Augusto's house. Victoriana refuses to let Mariluz live in her house. Emma learns that Mariluz is her half-sister. Augusto discovers that the Guerreros are Octavio's children. Upon learning the true identity of the Guerreros, Augusto decides to confront them. Federico informs Guadalupe that the house where she lives has been put up for sale.
118	"Los malos de la telenovela"	7 September 2022
Augusto gets his daughters to distrust the Guerreros and gives them 24 hours to get the evidence against him. Guadalupe assures Victoriana that Carlota is alive. Federico proposes to Victoriana to unite with the Guerreros so that they can destroy Augusto. Emma and Renata present a video in front of the parents where they accuse Rodrigo of being a stalker. Carlota appears in Victoriana's bedroom, Victoriana assures Augusto that Carlota is alive, but he does not believe her. Elisa shows the knife with which Augusto murdered Victoriana's father, she also reveals the letter left by Victoriano before he died, where he holds Augusto responsible if anything bad happens to him.
119	"Nada borra el daño"	8 September 2022
Augusto reveals that he took revenge on Victoriano after discovering that he stole all his money from his father, Doménica assures her father that the only thing he caused was to destroy his family. Carlota learns that Mariluz is expecting a baby. Doménica is disappointed in the Guerrero brothers. Elisa warns Augusto that she is willing to recover the farm he stole from her family. Federico sets a trap for Augusto and makes his daughters hate him. Federico tells Augusto that he got revenge on him for all the damage he did to his family. Augusto asks Guadalupe to escape with him, but she refuses. Emma and Adrián discover that they are not cousins. Elisa recovers the family farm. Mariluz surprises her mother by giving her a house.
120	"Es tiempo de hacer lo correcto"	9 September 2022
Doménica forgives Damián and decides to give him a chance, he surprises her by proposing marriage. Samuel asks Viviana to marry him. The Guerrero brothers get married with the women they love. Carlota shows up at the wedding and kidnaps Mariluz and Jesús' son, Angelito. Augusto prevents Carlota from hurting Angelito and saves him. Jesús asks Augusto to turn himself in to the authorities. Guadalupe visits Augusto in jail and tells him that she has forgiven him. Victoriana donates her fortune to a rehabilitation clinic. Adrián proposes marriage to Emma.
