= Héroes verdaderos =

- Film poster
- Directed by: Carlos Kuri
- Written by: Carlos Kuri; Riley Roca
- Produced by: Luis Curiel; Ana Cristina Fernández; Carlos Kuri
- Starring: José Lavat; Víctor Trujillo; Jacqueline Andere; Mario Filio; Pepe Vilchis; Kalimba Marichal; Sandra Echeverría
- Cinematography: Carlos Kuri
- Edited by: Carlos Kuri
- Music by: Renato Vizuet
- Production companies: Fidecine; Instituto Mexicano de Cinematografía (IMCINE); Quality Films
- Distributed by: Quality Films
- Release date: September 24, 2010 (Mexico)
- Running time: 100 minutes
- Country: Mexico
- Language: Spanish

Héroes verdaderos (lit. 'True heroes') is a 2010 Mexican animated biopic adventure film, that chronicles the adventures of the heroes of Mexicans independence Miguel Hidalgo and José María Morelos. In 2011 the movie was awarded with The Silver Goddesses.

== Plot ==
Two young men, a Creole and a mestizo, who are friends since childhood are involved in the independence movement as beyond the hatred of Xama, half brother of the half-blood.

== Cast ==
- José Lavat as Miguel Hidalgo y Costilla
- Víctor Trujillo as José María Morelos y Pavón
- Jacqueline Andere as Josefina
- Mario Filio as Ignacio Allende
- Pepe Vilchis as Juan Aldama
- Kalimba Marichal as Mixcóatl
- Sandra Echeverría as Tonatzin
