= Dayana Garroz =

Venezuelan actress

Dayana Garroz is a Venezuelan actress, best known for her recurring role as Ámbar Maldonado in the Telemundo's series El Señor de los Cielos. Although previously had notable characters in series as Perro amor (2010), El rostro de la venganza (2012), and Dueños del paraíso. (2015). In March 2021, Garroz became a US citizen.

== Career ==
Garroz at age 15 she entered a talent representation agency and that was when she began to make commercials, parades and participated in the 2001 Chica a beauty pageant. In 2001 she emigrated to the United States. Subsequently she moved to Miami where she debuted on television in the telenovela Gata Salvaje.

== Filmography ==
Television performances
Year	Title	Roles	Notes
2003	Gata salvaje	Wendy Torres	
2003	Rebeca	Marlene	Recurring role; 25 episodes
2004	Inocente de ti	Gladys Soler	
2006	Mi vida eres tú	Ana Reyes	
2006–2007	Decisiones	Various roles	3 episodes
2007	Seguro y urgente	Lorena	Episode: "El baile del gorila"
2007	Acorralada	Amanda Valderama	
2008	Valeria	Raquel	
2010	Perro amor	Viviana Herrera	
2010	Más sabe el diablo	Adamaris Gracia	
2012	Relaciones peligrosas	Julia Madrazo	
2012	Corazón apasionado	Emperatriz Ferrer de Meléndez	
2012	El rostro de la venganza	Carolina Pinto	
2015	Dueños del paraíso	Rita Corona	Recurring role; 35 episodes
2016	Eva la trailera	Marisol Campos	Recurring role; 68 episodes
2018	El Señor de los Cielos	Ámbar Maldonado	Recurring role (season 6); 83 episodes

== Stage ==
- Estelas del narco (2018)
