= La Bandida (TV series) =

Mexican television series

- Genre: Telenovela
- Created by: Carlos Quintanilla; Adriana Pelussi
- Written by: Mauricio Cruz; Rodrigo Ugalde
- Creative director: Ana Magis
- Starring: Sandra Echeverría
- Opening theme: "Bandida" by Sandra Echeverría
- Country of origin: Mexico
- Original language: Spanish
- No. of seasons: 1
- No. of episodes: 62

Production
- Executive producer: Andrés Santamaría
- Camera setup: Multi-camera
- Production companies: Teleset; Sony Pictures Television; Televisión Azteca

Original release
- Network: Amazon Video
- Release: 1 March 2019

La Bandida is a Mexican telenovela produced by Andrés Santamaría. The series is written by Carlos Quintanilla and Adriana Pelussi and developed by Teleset, Sony Pictures Television and Televisión Azteca. It stars Sandra Echeverría as the titular character.

== Plot ==
Graciela's life was not easy, she was orphaned and also became a very young widow. She started stealing, placing bets and dealing with alcohol. In this way she managed to amass a great fortune, which she invested in the creation of a dating house. Inspired by the 30s, the series will initially tell the beginning of the protagonist as a trafficker, in a role that will be played by Julieta Grajales, to subsequently present Graciela (Sandra Echeverría) in her adult stage, where most of the story will take place.

== Cast ==
- Sandra Echeverría as Graciela Olmos
  - Julieta Grajales as Young Graciela
- Ianis Guerrero as José Hernández
- Marcia Coutiño as Sister Catalina
- Ariel López Padilla
- Albi De Abreu as Tommy Harton
- Iván Arana as Pedro Núñez
- Adrián Morales
- Alfredo Huereca as General Ordóñez
- Fernanda Arozqueta
- Memo Villegas
- Marcelo Córdoba as Martín
- Vicky Araico as Marieta
- Antonio Fortier
- Cinthia Vázquez
- David Medel
- José Carlos Fermat
- Juan Pablo Franco
- Shaila Dúrcal
- Arantza Ruiz
- Florencia Ríos
- Gimena Gómez as La Rubia
- Jessica Ortiz
- María Gonllegos
- María del Carmen Félix

== Broadcast ==
The series premiered first in El Salvador on Canal 2 on 10 January 2019, although the date on which it ended and how many episodes its first broadcast was unknown. In Mexico and throughout Latin America it is available online since 1 March 2019. In Latin America (excluding United States), it premiered on 13 January 2020 on Telemundo Internacional, and the series is expected to last a total of 70 episodes on this network.

== Episodes ==
No.	Title	Original release date	Prod. code
1	"Episode 1"	1 March 2019	0101
Graciela is taken by the police to an interrogation room, where she is questioned by Manuel. Years ago he was known as Marina, he lived at Hacienda Buenaventura with his family: Benjamin, his brother; Rosaura, her stepmother and Jacinto, her father.
2	"Episode 2"	1 March 2019	0102
3	"Episode 3"	1 March 2019	0103
4	"Episode 4"	1 March 2019	0104
5	"Episode 5"	1 March 2019	0105
6	"Episode 6"	1 March 2019	0106
7	"Episode 7"	1 March 2019	0107
8	"Episode 8"	1 March 2019	0108
9	"Episode 9"	1 March 2019	0109
10	"Episode 10"	1 March 2019	0110
11	"Episode 11"	1 March 2019	0111
12	"Episode 12"	1 March 2019	0112
13	"Episode 13"	1 March 2019	0113
14	"Episode 14"	1 March 2019	0114
15	"Episode 15"	1 March 2019	0115
16	"Episode 16"	1 March 2019	0116
17	"Episode 17"	1 March 2019	0117
18	"Episode 18"	1 March 2019	0118
19	"Episode 19"	1 March 2019	0119
20	"Episode 20"	1 March 2019	0120
21	"Episode 21"	1 March 2019	0121
22	"Episode 22"	1 March 2019	0122
23	"Episode 23"	1 March 2019	0123
24	"Episode 24"	1 March 2019	0124
25	"Episode 25"	1 March 2019	0125
26	"Episode 26"	1 March 2019	0126
27	"Episode 27"	1 March 2019	0127
28	"Episode 28"	1 March 2019	0128
29	"Episode 29"	1 March 2019	0129
30	"Episode 30"	1 March 2019	0130
31	"Episode 31"	1 March 2019	0131
32	"Episode 32"	1 March 2019	0132
33	"Episode 33"	1 March 2019	0133
34	"Episode 34"	1 March 2019	0134
35	"Episode 35"	1 March 2019	0135
36	"Episode 36"	1 March 2019	0136
37	"Episode 37"	1 March 2019	0137
38	"Episode 38"	1 March 2019	0138
39	"Episode 39"	1 March 2019	0139
40	"Episode 40"	1 March 2019	0140
41	"Episode 41"	1 March 2019	0141
42	"Episode 42"	1 March 2019	0142
43	"Episode 43"	1 March 2019	0143
44	"Episode 44"	1 March 2019	0144
45	"Episode 45"	1 March 2019	0145
46	"Episode 46"	1 March 2019	0146
47	"Episode 47"	1 March 2019	0147
48	"Episode 48"	1 March 2019	0148
49	"Episode 49"	1 March 2019	0149
50	"Episode 50"	1 March 2019	0150
51	"Episode 51"	1 March 2019	0151
52	"Episode 52"	1 March 2019	0152
53	"Episode 53"	1 March 2019	0153
54	"Episode 54"	1 March 2019	0154
55	"Episode 55"	1 March 2019	0155
56	"Episode 56"	1 March 2019	0156
57	"Episode 57"	1 March 2019	0157
58	"Episode 58"	1 March 2019	0158
59	"Episode 59"	1 March 2019	0159
60	"Episode 60"	1 March 2019	0160
61	"Episode 61"	1 March 2019	0161
62	"Episode 62"	1 March 2019	0162
