= Sandra Echeverría =

Mexican actress

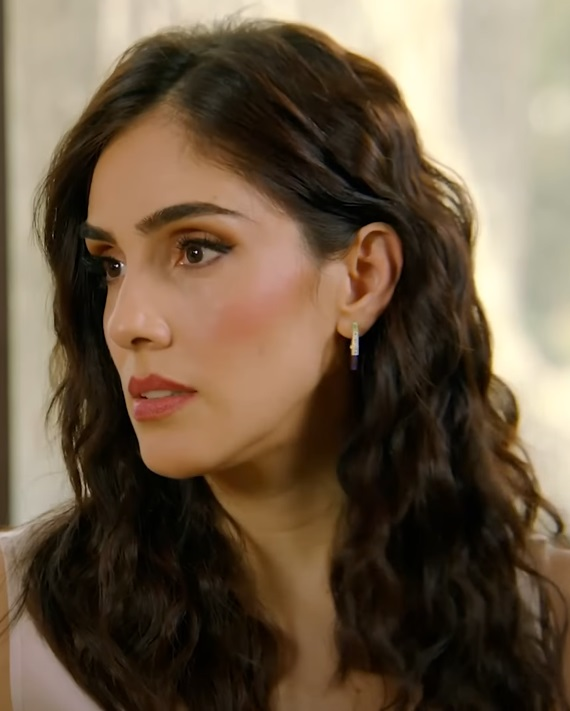
- Echeverría in 2024
- Born: Sandra Echeverría Gamboa; December 11, 1984 (age 41); Mexico City, Mexico
- Occupations: Actress; singer
- Years active: 2002–present
- Spouse: Leonardo de Lozanne (m. 2014; div. 2022)
- Children: 1

Sandra Echeverría Gamboa (born December 11, 1984) is a Mexican actress.

== Life and career ==
In 2002, Echeverría starred in TV Azteca's Súbete A Mi Moto, alongside Bárbara Mori and Michel Brown. In 2004, she led the second season of TV Azteca's Soñarás. In 2006, she starred in Telemundo's Marina, opposite Mauricio Ochmann. Her co-protagonist was eventually replaced by Manolo Cardona.

In 2008, she played the girlfriend of High School Musical Star Corbin Bleu in Free Style. She also starred in El Diez with Alfonso Herrera. The movie, whose story revolves around football, premiered in 2010, to coincide with the World Cup in South Africa. She reunited with Mauricio Ochmann in El Clon, a joint venture of Rede Globo and Telemundo.

In 2010, she had the lead in a science fiction movie in Mexico, called 2033. In 2011, she starred in Televisa's La fuerza del destino with David Zepeda, although she is still under Telemundo. In 2011 she starred in El cartel de los sapos as ELiana, together with Manolo Cardona, Pedro Armendáriz Jr. and Saúl Lisazo.

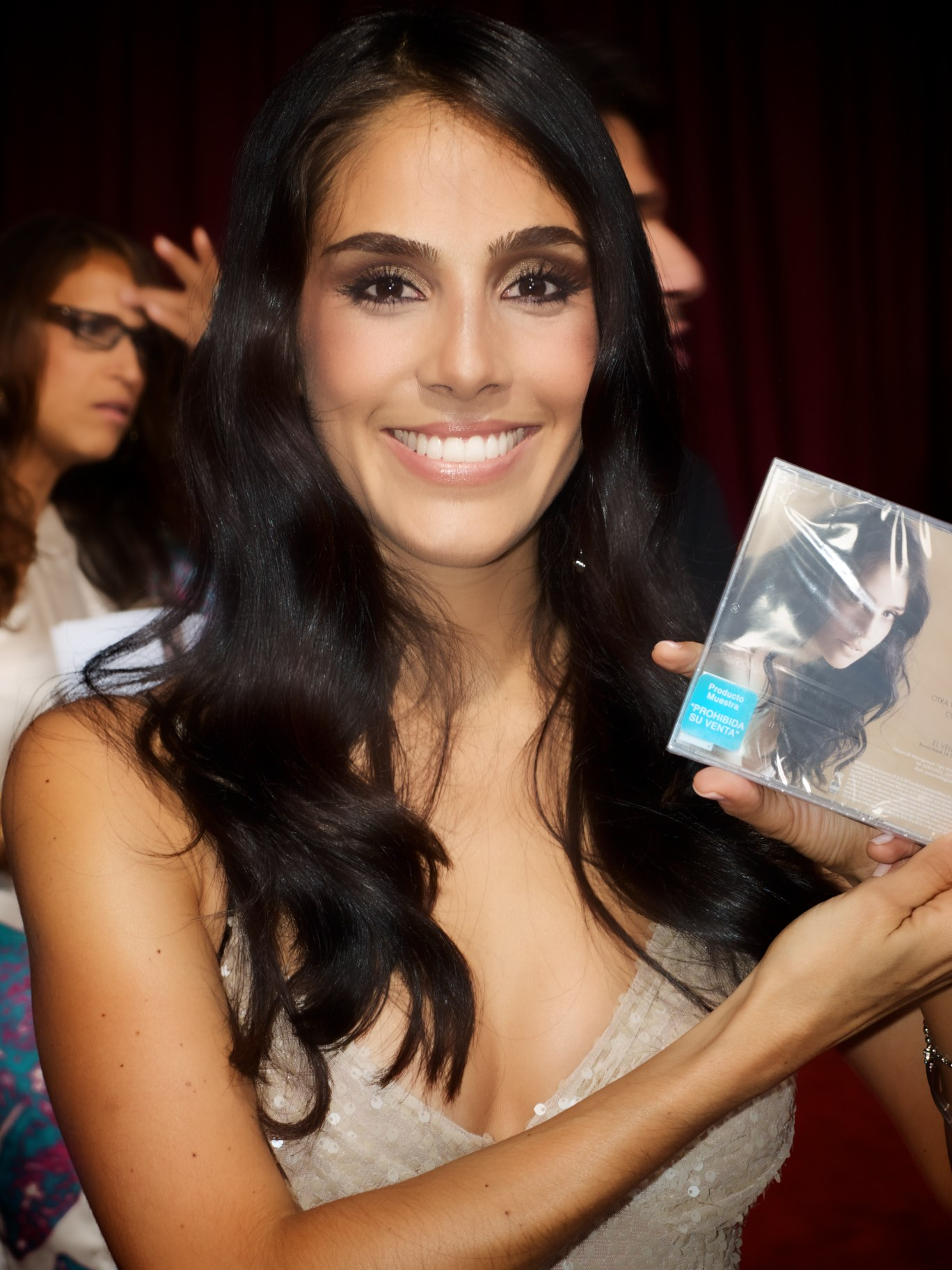
Echeverría in September 2011.

In 2012, she starred in Relaciones Peligrosas under Telemundo Studios, with Gabriel Coronel. In 2012 she starred in Matt Piedmont's comedy Casa de Mi Padre as Miguel Ernesto's wife (in the flashback). The telenovela La Traicion (2008) was originally announced with Mario Cimarro, Sandra Echeverría and Gabriel Porras as stars. Danna Garcia replaced Echeverría and Salvador del Solar replaced Porras, who took the male lead in Madre Luna. In 2012, Echeverría starred in an Oliver Stone Movie, Savages as Magda, Elena's daughter which was played by Salma Hayek.

In 2013, Echeverría played the character Eva Guerra in the FX television drama The Bridge, the estranged girlfriend of a narco-trafficker and killer who is seeking her, but who is helped by character Steven Linder.

The last few years She has done several films and tv series like “Cambio de Ruta”, “Amor de mis Amores”, “Busco Novio para mi mujer”, “Más Sabe el Diablo por Viejo”, “Las Píldoras de mi Novio” and She broke records of rating with “La Usurpadora”.

She also did “La Querida del Centauro” and starred in “La Bandida”.

She released the album “Instinto” in 2019. She is now preparing a new Mariachi album.

== Filmography ==
=== Film roles ===
Year	Title	Roles	Notes
2006	The 7	Ana María	
2008	Crazy	Sultry Brunette	Uncredited
2008	Double Dagger	Carmen	
2008	Persiguiendo un sueño	Alex López	
2009	Condones.com	Gabriela	
2009	2033	Lucía	
2010	Héroes verdaderos	Tonatzin	Voice role
2010	De día y de noche	Aurora	
2011	The Snitch Cartel	Eliana	
2012	Casa de mi padre	Miguel Ernesto's Wife	
2012	Savages	Magda	
2014	Cambio de ruta	Nicté Domínguez	
2014	Quiero ser fiel	Sara	
2014	Volando bajo	Sara Medrano	
2014	Amor de mis amores	Lucía	
2014	The Book of Life	Claudia	Voice role
2016	Busco novio para mi mujer	Dana	
2016	The Secret Life of Pets	María	Voice role
2018	Más sabe el Diablo por viejo	Dafne	
2018	El día de la unión	Ximena	
2018	Justice for All	Elaine	
2019	The Secret Life of Pets 2	Additional Voices	Voice role
2020	Las pildoras de mi Novio	Jess	
2021	Perfecto Anfitrión	Clara	
2022	¡Qué despadre!	Helena	

=== Television roles ===
Year	Title	Roles	Notes
2002	Súbete a mi moto	Mariana	Main role; 148 episodes
2004	Soñarás	Estefanía	Main role; 134 episodes
2006	Marina	Marina Hernández	Main role; 168 episodes
2010	El Clon	Jade Mebarak	Main role; 179 episodes
2011	La fuerza del destino	Lucía Lomeli Curiel	Main role; 93 episodes
2011	Generator Rex	Beatriz	Episode: "Phantom of the Soap Opera"
2012	Relaciones peligrosas	Miranda Beatriz Cruz	Main role; 87 episodes
2013	The Bridge	Sara Vega	Episode: "Destino"
2017	Criminal Minds: Beyond Borders	Paola	Episode: "The Devil's Breath"
2017	La querida del Centauro	Ana Velazco	Main role (season 2); 89 episodes
2019	La Bandida	Graciela Olmos	Main role; 62 episodes
2019	La usurpadora	Paola Miranda de Bernal / Paulina Doria	Main role; 25 episodes
2021	¿Quién es la máscara?	Androide	Season 3
2022	María Félix: La Doña	Maria Felix	Main role
2024-present	Casados con hijos	Angie Lo	Main role
2026	El Señor de los Cielos	Prosecutor Huerta	Season 10

== Discography ==
=== Soundtrack ===
Year	Series	Song Title
2011	La fuerza del destino	"La fuerza del destino" (featuring Marc Anthony)
2010	El Clon	"El Velo Del Amor" (featuring Mario Reyes)
2006	Marina	"Nos Volveremos A Ver"

==== As featured artist ====
Title	Year	Peak chart positions		Album
Title	Year	Airplay	Español Airplay	Album
"Resistiré México" (among Artists for Mexico)	2020	15	4	Non-album single

== Awards and nominations ==
Year	Award	Category	Title of Work	Result
2002	Mexican Journalist Circle	Best New Actress	Súbete A Mi Moto	Won
2007	New York ACE Awards	New Female Face	Crazy	Won
2010	Premios People en Español	Best Revelation of the Year	El Clon	Nominated
2010	Premios People en Español	Best Couple (with Mauricio Ochmann)	El Clon	Nominated
2011	TVyNovelas Awards (Colombia)	Best Lead Actress	El Clon	Nominated
2011	Premios People en Español	Best Actress	La Fuerza del Destino	Nominated
2011	Premios People en Español	Best Couple (with David Zepeda)	La Fuerza del Destino	Nominated
2012	Premios Juventud	Girl of my Dreams	La Fuerza del Destino	Nominated
2012	Premios Juventud	Best Theme Novelero	La Fuerza del Destino	Nominated
2012	TVyNovelas Awards	Best Lead Actress	La Fuerza del Destino	Won
2012	Premios People en Español	Best Actress	Relaciones Peligrosas	Nominated
2012	Premios People en Español	Best Couple (with Gabriel Coronel)	Relaciones Peligrosas	Nominated
2020	TVyNovelas Awards	Best Lead Actress	La usurpadora	Won
2020	TVyNovelas Awards	Best Antagonist Actress	La usurpadora	Won

- People En Español named Sandra as "One of the 50 most beautiful people" in 2012.
