= Maritza Bustamante =

Venezuelan actress and model

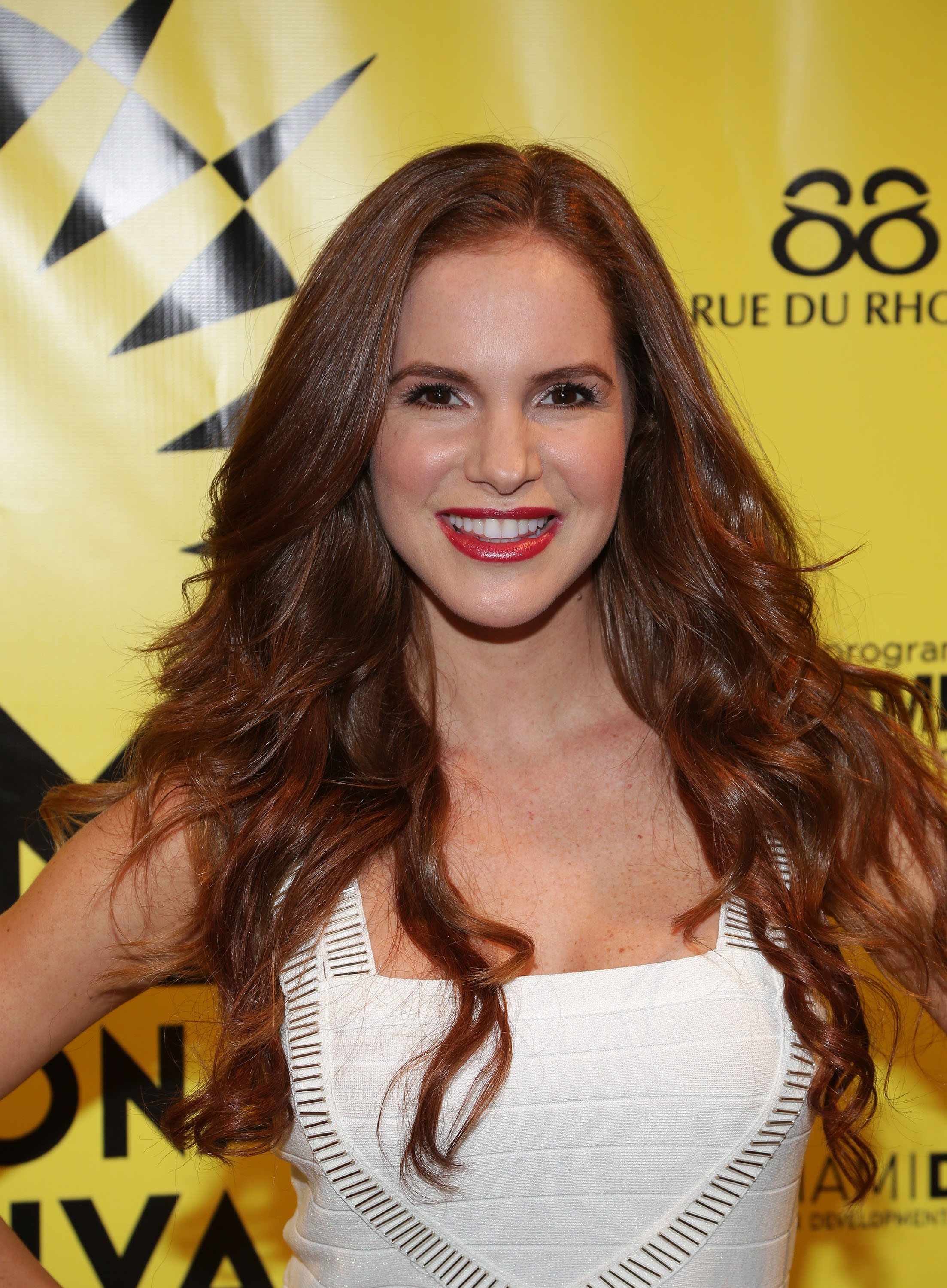
- Bustamante at the 2014 Miami International Film Festival
- Born: Maritza Bustamante; September 26, 1980 (age 45); Caracas, Venezuela
- Occupations: Actress; model; dancer
- Years active: 2000 - Present

Maritza Bustamante Abidar (better known as Maritza Bustamante; born September 26, 1980) is a Venezuelan actress and model. She is mostly known for her participation in Venezuelan telenovelas with the TV network Venevisión.

== Career ==
In 2010, she signed a contract with the TV network Telemundo. Her first soap opera for the network was The dog love.

In 2010, she worked as an antagonist in the soap opera, El fantasma de Elena.

In 2012, she participates in the soap opera, Relaciones Peligrosas, remake of the Spanish series Física o Química.

== Filmography ==
Year	Title	Character	Channel
2000	Más que amor...frenesí	María Fernanda López Fajardo	Venevisión
2000	Guerra de mujeres		Venevisión
2001	Las González		Venevisión
2003	Engañada	Jennifer Cardenás	Venevisión
2004	Ángel rebelde	Mariela Covarrubias	Venevisión
2000	Amarte así	Barbie	
2005	El amor no tiene precio	Federica 'Kika' Mendéz	Fonovideo Production
2006	Mi vida eres tú	Beatriz 'Betty'	Venevisión
2007	Acorralada	Caramelo Vasquez	Univisión Network & Venevisión
2008	Torrente	Ana Julia Briceño Mendizábal	Venevisión
2010	Pecadora	Barbie	Venevisión Internacional
2010	Perro Amor	Daniela Valdiri	Telemundo
2010	El Fantasma de Elena	Corina Santander	Telemundo
2012	Relaciones Peligrosas	Ana Conde	Telemundo
2012	Los secretos de Lucía	Bonny Cabello	Venevisión
2014	Reina de Corazones	Jacqueline Montoya	Telemundo
2016	Eva la trailera	Ana Maria Granados	Telemundo
2017	La fan	Lucia Hernandez/Úrsula Molina vda de Blanco	Telemundo

== Personal life ==
Maritza is the sister of the animator Nelson Bustamante.
