= Gabriel Coronel =

Venezuelan actor (born 1987)

- Born: Gabriel Eduardo Coronel Petrilli; 13 February 1987 (age 39); Barquisimeto, Venezuela
- Occupations: Actor, singer
- Years active: 2007–present
- Spouse: Daniela Ospina (m. 2026)

Gabriel Eduardo Coronel Petrilli (born 13 February 1987) is a Venezuelan actor and singer.

He began his career by participating in theater plays, then in 2007 took part in the casting of Somos tú y yo to join the cast in which he plays Gabriel "Gabo", from there decided to open routes to the United States, where he starred in the telenovela Relaciones Peligrosas as Mauricio Blanco. As star of the telenovela, he was nominated, in 2012, for the first edition of the Premios Tu Mundo and also to Premios People en Español.

== Career ==
=== 2007–12: Somos Tú y Yo and Relaciones Peligrosas ===
Coronel studied music and acting, first at the Conservatory of Music of Lara, centroccidente in Venezuela. He began his career by participating in various modeling campaigns, and then obtained youth roles in Venezuelan telenovelas, such as Somos tú y yo on Venevisión, and its successor, Somos tú y yo: un nuevo día, also on Venevisión. Coronel also portrayed several theater roles during that time.

In 2012 Coronel made his foray into international TV, appearing with the U.S. network Telemundo, in the telenovela Relaciones Peligrosas in the role of Mauricio Blanco, a young man who is attracted to his teacher.

=== 2013: Marido en Alquiler – Debut album ===
Coronel was hired to record Marido En Alquiler, the United States remake of Fina Estampa, as Antonio Salinas, Griselda Carrasco's (Sonya Smith) son who succeeded in his effort to be the only one in his family to go to college. However he said that the character suffers the embarrassment of coming from a poor family and to see his mother working as a handyman.

In the Show he shares credits with Juan Soler and Maritza Rodríguez, also with Kimberly Dos Ramos, who played Patricia Ibarra, Antonio's girlfriend. Coronel and Dos Ramos play young protagonists.

At the end of 2012, Gabriel became the first artist to be signed under a new partnership between Telemundo and record label Warner Music Latina. His debut single, "Desnudo" was released digitally on 23 July 2013 through Warner Music Latina. The music video for the song was filmed in Miami, Fl and released on 13 August. Gabriel's first live performance of the song took place during the 2nd annual Premios Tu Mundo award show, hosted by Telemundo at the American Airlines Arena on 15 August 2013.

== Filmography ==
Television
Year	Title	Role	Notes
2007–2009	Somos tú y yo	Gabriel "El Gago"	Recurring role
2012	Relaciones peligrosas	Mauricio Blanco	Lead role
2013	Marido en alquiler	José Antonio Salinas Carrasco	Main role
2014	Reina de corazones	Francisco "Frank" Marino / Javier Bolívar	Recurring role
2015	Top Chef Estrellas	Himself	Season 2
2015–2016	El Señor de los Cielos	Armando Pérez Ricard	Recurring role
2019	Betty en NY	Nacho	Recurring role
2020	Tu cara me suena	Himself	Season 1
2024	Top Chef VIP	Himself	Season 3
2024	Sed de venganza	Joseph Price	Main Role
2025-present	En casa con Telemundo	Himself	Host

== Theater ==
- La Navidad de Lucy
- Anastasia
- La princesa Kira

== Discography ==
=== Studio albums ===
List of studio albums, with selected chart positions
Title	Album details	Peak chart positions		
Title	Album details	Latin Pop Albums	Top Heatseekers	Top Latin Albums
Desnudo	Released: 23 July 2013; Formats: CD; Label: Warner Music Latin	2	36	14

=== Singles ===
List of singles, with selected chart positions, showing year released and album name
Title	Year	Peak chart positions	Album
Title	Year	Latin Pop Airplay	Album
"Una vez más"	2012	—	Non-album song
"La alegría de vivir"	2013	—	Desnudo
"Desnudo"	2013	29	Desnudo
"Happy"	2013	—	Desnudo
"Yo te amé"	2013	—	Desnudo
"La vida sin ti"	2013	—	Desnudo
"Bailando en el limbo"	2013	—	Desnudo
"La fuerza de mi ser"	2013	—	Desnudo
"Yo te haré feliz"	2013	—	Desnudo
"Llora llora"	2013	—	Desnudo
"Ritual"	2013	—	Desnudo

=== Music videos ===
Title	Year	Notes
"Una vez más"	2012	Song of the telenovela Relaciones peligrosas
"Desnudo"	2013	Song of the telenovela Marido en alquiler
"Yo te amé"	2014	Song of the telenovela Reina de corazones

== Awards and nominations ==
Year	Award	Category	Nominated	Result
2012	Premios People en Español			
2012	Premios People en Español	Best actor	Relaciones peligrosas	Nominated
2012	Premios People en Español	Revelation of the Year	Relaciones peligrosas	Nominated
2012	Premios People en Español	Best Couple (with Sandra Echeverría)	Relaciones peligrosas	Nominated
2012	Premios Tu Mundo		Relaciones peligrosas	
2012	Premios Tu Mundo	Favorite Lead Actor	Relaciones peligrosas	Nominated
2013	Miami Life Awards		Relaciones peligrosas	
2013	Miami Life Awards	Best Actor	Relaciones peligrosas	Won
2013	Premios People en Español			
2013	Premios People en Español	New Talent of Telenovela	Marido en alquiler	Nominated
2014	Miami Life Awards		Marido en alquiler	
2014	Miami Life Awards	Best Young Actor	Marido en alquiler	Nominated
2014	Premios Tu Mundo		Marido en alquiler	
2014	Premios Tu Mundo	Best Supporting Actor	Marido en alquiler	Won
2014	Premios Tu Mundo	¡Qué Papacito!	Marido en alquiler	Won
2015	Miami Life Awards		Marido en alquiler	
2015	Miami Life Awards	Best Young Actor	Reina de corazones	Won
