= La saga, negocio de familia =

- Genre: Telenovela
- Created by: Dario Alberto Dago García
- Written by: Dago García, Paola Cázares, Paola Arias
- Directed by: Juan Carlos Villamizar Delgado, Diego Mejía, Germán Porras, Juan Delgado
- Starring: Robinson Díaz; Diego Cadavid; Frank Ramírez; Juan Carlos Vargas; Luis Fernando Bohórquez; Nicolás Rincón; Manuel José Chávez; Marlon Moreno; Jairo Camargo; Ronald Ayazo; Katherine Vélez; Flora Martínez; María Helena Doering; Isabella Santodomingo; Luis Mesa; Sandra Reyes; Catalina Aristizábal; Martina García; Patricia Castañeda; Ana Bolena Meza; Patricia Ércole; Manuela González; Estefanía Borge; Liliana González; Judy Henríquez; Patricia Vásquez
- Opening theme: Instrumental
- Country of origin: Colombia
- Original language: Spanish
- No. of episodes: 188

Production
- Executive producer: Orlando Jiménez
- Producer: Dago García
- Production location: Bogotá
- Camera setup: Multicamera
- Running time: 45 minutes

Original release
- Network: Caracol TV
- Release: September 20, 2004 – September 29, 2005

Related
- El autentico Rodrigo Leal; El Baile de la vida

La Saga, Negocio de Familia (in English The Saga, Family business) is a Colombian telenovela which aired in 2004 by Caracol TV and then in 2006 by GenTV in South Florida. The show follows the history of the Manrique family, which was prominent in the underworld of Bogotá, Colombia. This telenovela is characterized by an unconventional plot: unlike many others, it is not a love story, but several stories of events that occur through five generations of the same family. Moreover, there is no humor and the plot is marked by death, suffering and crime. It received the "Best Telenovela" award at the Colombian Television Awards in 2005.

== Plot ==
1930: Exile This is the story of the Manrique, a provincial family that moved to Bogotá after one of its patriarchs decided to try his luck in the city. He ended up founding a criminal organization by accident and decided to strengthen it. Then, he tried to reintegrate into society but tragically succumbed after having created an illegal world.

The decade of the 30s brought a radical, violent, and armed political conflict to the country. Tomás Manrique, a man of class and wealthy family, had to flee his home town with his wife Josefina and his son Pedrito. During the night, an armed group unexpectedly barges into a party, killing every male they found to be in the opposing political party. When this war that Tomás had decided not to be a part of had begun, he moves to the capital with his family helped by a worker from the railway station. The worker, Pascual Martinez, leads them to a small inn owned by Magnolia, a woman dedicated to witchcraft. However, Pascual, in complicity with Magnolia, breaks into the family's room and steals their money, after Pascual decides he can be cheated. When Tomás confronts him, he is brutally beaten, but when he recovers from his wounds, Tomás takes revenge by stealing Pascual's gold cuff links from his room. Later, both men settle their differences and go to a brothel owned by Deborah, Pascual's lover. The brothel becomes a haunt for both of them. Helped by Pascual, Tomás accepts a job in a factory that manufactures screws.

One afternoon, a group of thieves enters the factory. Tomás accidentally ends up being the hero when he immobilizes the criminals, winning the respect and trust of his boss Facundo, who allows Tomás, dandy by nature, to enter and desire his wealthy lifestyle, full of luxury and commodity. But Tomás knows that collecting such a fortune means many years of hard work, and he is not willing to wait that long. He decides to rob his boss's house with the complicity of Pascual, a thief and new friend. In order to get the guns for this, they made a deal with a mobster who, in return, asks for part of the loot and takes Pedro, Tomás's son, as a guarantee. Tomás accepts the deal, but things get complicated, and he ends up accidentally killing his boss and also later killing the mobster who lent them the guns, thereby not sharing any of the loot. He rescues his son and gets home with a feeling of having done the right thing.

This marks the beginning of a world of crime in the life of Tomás, and little by little, the Manriques rise to the point of a stable income and well-being through legal and illegal businesses. Tomás's dream of becoming a well-established, honest businessman and gentleman never comes true, and he slowly resigns himself to work in the underworld.

1940s: The Legacy

Ten years later, Pedro has become 20. Pedro falls in love with the daughter of the man who killed the men of his village. Pedro plays poker with the man and with help from Pasqual he gets all of the man's money. His daughter hated Pedro when she found out that her father lost the money she made a deal. The deal was if she could beat him she would get the money back for her father. If she lost she would have sex with him. He almost lost but, wins he tells her he is better than that and that if she wants him to condone her father's debt she has to marry him. Which she accepts.

== Cast ==
- Robinson Díaz as Tomás Manrique (Ernesto Enríquez)
- Diego Cadavid as Pedro Manrique Zárate (joven)/Manuel Manrique Guzmán (joven)/Óscar Manrique Angarita
- Cristian Santos as Pedro Manrique Zárate (niño)
- Katherine Vélez as Josefina Zárate de Manrique
- Flora Martínez as Marlén Romero de Manrique (joven)
- María Helena Doering as Marlén Romero de Manrique
- Frank Ramírez as Pedro Manrique Zárate (Rosendo Enríquez)/Manuel Manrique Guzmán
- Juan Carlos Vargas as Armando Manrique Romero (Francisco Enríquez)/Iván Manrique Zapata
- Luis Fernando Bohórquez as Antonio Manrique Romero (Hermilio Enríquez)
- Isabella Santodomingo as Ana María Guzmán de Manrique
- Sandra Reyes as Pilar de Manrique
- Jonathan Herrera as Manuel Manrique (niño)
- Germán Daniel Villegas as Tito Manrique (niño)
- Nicolás Rincón as Tito Manrique Guzmán (joven)
- Jairo Camargo as Tito Manrique Guzmán
- Sebastián Peñuela as Ernesto Manrique (niño)
- Manuel José Chávez as Ernesto Manrique (joven)
- Ronald Ayazo as Ernesto Manrique
- Catalina Aristizábal as Clemencia Angarita de Manrique (joven)
- Ana Bolena Meza as Clemencia Angarita de Manrique
- Martina García as Helena Angarita de Manrique (joven)
- Patricia Ércole as Helena Angarita de Manrique
- Adriana Romero as Lucrecia Zapata (joven)
- Judy Henríquez as Lucrecia Zapata
- Liliana González de la Torre as Inés Manrique Angarita
- Manuela González as Estela Manrique Angarita
- Estefanía Borge as Claudia Manrique Angarita
- Adriana Arango as Carmenza "Candy" López de Zapata/"Candelaria González"
- Edgardo Román as Ananías Romero "El Capi"
- Marlon Moreno as Pascual Martínez
- Vicky Hernández as Magnolia
- Maribel Abello as Déborah/Lola
- Herbert King as "Kit" Romano Valdés
- Liliana Salazar as Grecia
- Andrés Felipe Martínez as Augusto Faryala
- Carlos Serrato as Roberto Romero/Faryala Jr.
- Juan Pablo Barragán as Elkin
- Fernando Arango as Agente Niño
- Germán Quintero as Tiberio Angarita/Humberto Angarita (Federico Raldes)
- Gilberto Ramírez as Tarcisio
- Humberto Arango as Fernando Benítez
- Fernando Arévalo as Casimiro Ruiz/Facundo López
- Juan Pablo Franco as Héctor Ruiz
- Alejandro Martínez as Felipe "Pipe" Ruiz
- Alejandra Miranda as Hortensia de Ruiz
- Patricia Bermúdez as Carolina Ruiz
- Adriana Ricardo as Andrea Jiménez de Ruiz
- Luis Fernando Múnera as Federico Muñoz
- Consuelo Moure as Amparo de Muñoz
- Luigi Aycardi as Omar Muñoz
- Élmer Valenzuela - Mauricio Muñoz
- Sandra Pérez as Paola Muñoz
- Carlos Barbosa Romero as John Jairo "J.J." Garrido
- Andre Bauth as Enrique
- Álvaro Bayona as Cominito Pérez
- Fernando Solórzano as Aquilino Camargo/"Chicanero" Arzuaga
- Felipe Calero as Pirro Camargo
- Andrea López as Alexa
- Pilar Cárdenas as Gilma
- Marco Antonio López as José Gaitán
- Húgo Armando Aguilera as Roberto Márquez
- Saín Castro as Teniente/Capitán Motta
- Carlos Cifuentes as Doctor Leididi
- David Osorio as Raúl Benítez, recepcionista hotel
- Harold Córdoba as Osvaldo Tovar
- Fernando Corredor as Antuco
- Samara de Córdova as Lilia/Maruja
- Juan Carlos Delgado as Lucho
- Jenny Díaz as Margarita
- Jimmy Vázquez as José Leonardo Vargas
- Mario Duarte as Jaime Angulo
- Alexandra Restrepo as Ginger
- Jorge Herrera as José María Manosalva
- Patricia Vásquez as Herlinda Zapata
- Carolina Cuervo as Yolanda
- John Mario Rivera as Teniente Julián Santamaría
- Sergio González as Rigoleto Castro
- Yuly Ferreira as Marieta Castro
- Diego Giraldo as Genaro
- Armando Gutiérrez as Teófilo Cruz
- Ignacio Hijuelos as Alfredo
- Andrés Huertas as Padre Huertas
- Franky Linero as Abogado Julio Miranda
- Jorge Mantilla as Suárez
- Kike Mendoza as Víctor González/Rodríguez, "Pochola"
- Ramiro Meneses as El Chiqui
- Luis Mesa as Daniel Ochoa
- Wilson Buitrago as Rómulo Almanza
- Margoth Velásquez as Teodolinda
- Álvaro Barrera as Teniente Leopoldo Cárdenas
- Víctor Hugo Ruiz as Carlos Baquero
- David Osorio as Cabo/Teniente Muñoz
- Juan Carlos Arango as Gerardo
- Aura Helena Prada as Betty
- José Manuel Ospina as Álvarez
- Lady Noriega as Natasha
- Guillermo Olarte as Teniente Robles
- Harold Palacios as Arteaga
- July Pedraza as Mariela
- Claude Pimont as Marcel Dumond
- Luis Fernando Potes as Jiménez
- Alfonso Rojas as Carabina
- Marcela Angarita as Lina
- Alejandra Sandoval as Teresa Galindo
- Jairo Sedano as Anastasio
- Paola Suárez as Lupita
- Patricia Castañeda as Patricia Angarita
- Evelyn Santos as Gilma Ortega, "Gigi"
- Rafael Cardoso as López
- Luis Fernando Salas as "Quique"
- Rodrigo Rodríguez as "El Apache"
- Jorge Pérez as Lucio Benítez
- Guillermo Gálvez as Julio Ortiz
- Lucho Velasco as Camilo Cruz, "El Pereza"
- Alicia de Rojas as Doña Virgelina
- Fernando Peñuela as Ever Murillo
- Elkin Díaz as Nieto de 'Chicanero' Arzuaga
- Marcela Carvajal as Marina Guzmán
- Juan Carlos Pérez Almanza as Efraín/Manteca
