= El baño =

El baño may refer to:

- El baño (2005 film), a Chilean black comedy film directed by Gregory Cohen
- El baño (2020 film), a Colombian comedy film directed by Harold Trompetero
- "El Baño" (song), a song by Enrique Iglesias featuring Bad Bunny
