= Búscame =

Studio album by Jencarlos Canela
- Released: November 10, 2009
- Recorded: 2008–2009
- Studio: The Record Plant (Los Angeles, California); The Beach House (Miami Beach, Florida)
- Genre: Latin pop · Latin ballad
- Length: 52:09
- Language: Spanish
- Label: Bullseye Music
- Producer: Rudy Pérez · Rick Stevens · Marco Bissi

Jencarlos Canela chronology
Búscame (2009)	Un Nuevo Día (2011)

Singles from Búscame
- 1. "Amor Quédate" Released: September 14, 2009; 2. "Búscame" Released: April 12, 2010

Búscame is the debut studio album recorded by Cuban-American singer-songwriter and actor Jencarlos Canela. The album was released by Bullseye Records on November 10, 2009 (see 2009 in music). The album features the hit single "Amor Quédate", the theme song from the hit Telemundo telenovela Más Sabe el Diablo. "Búscame" was produced by: Rudy Pérez, a partner in Bullseye Music along with music industry: Rick Stevens and Marco Bissi.

Búscame seems to be the highest album to debut on the Billboard Latin Chart, reaching the #2 spot in the "Latin Pop Albums" in the first week. According to SoundScan.com the albums has sold around more than 8,000 copies.

== Singles ==
1. Amor Quédate - 3:39
2. Búscame - 3:15

== Track listing ==
No.	Title	Writer(s)	Length
1.	"Nadie Como Yo"	Chris Price · Rudy Pérez	3:30
2.	"Búscame"	Rudy Pérez · Marcelo Sánchez	3:15
3.	"Amor Quédate"	Rudy Pérez	3:39
4.	"Porque Aun Te Amo"	Rudy Pérez	4:26
5.	"Sálvame"	Rudy Pérez	3:29
6.	"Tu Veneno"	Rudy Pérez · Marcelo Sánchez	2:49
7.	"No Te Voy a Perder"	Rudy Pérez	3:18
8.	"Más Fuerte Que Yo"	Rudy Pérez	3:43
9.	"Estés Donde Estés"	Jencarlos Canela	3:42
10.	"Quiero Despertar"	Jencarlos Canela	3:50
11.	"Una Lágrima No Basta"	Adolfo Ángel	3:46
12.	"Es Tan Triste"	Rudy Pérez	2:11
13.	"Amor Quédate [Unplugged Version]"	Rudy Pérez	3:38
14.	"Amor Quédate [Salsa Version]"	Rudy Pérez	4:49
15.	"Amor Quédate [Club Version]"	Rudy Pérez	3:33
16.	"Amor Quédate [Multimedia / Video Bonus]"	Rudy Pérez	3:59
Total length:			52:09

== Reception ==
Professional ratings
Review scores
Source	Rating
Allmusic	3/5 stars

Allmusic gave the album a three-star rating, and Thom Jurek compared the song "Nadie Como Yo" to E Street Band for the piano arrangements and the drum beat to Juanes. Jurek also pointed that most of the song composition are pop ballads with "Salvame" and "Quiero Despertar" as the best of these.

== Charts ==
=== Weekly charts ===
Weekly chart performance for Búscame
Chart (2009)	Peak position
US Billboard 200	91
US Independent Albums (Billboard)	7
US Top Latin Albums (Billboard)	2
US Latin Pop Albums (Billboard)	1

=== Year-end charts ===
Year-end chart performance for Búscame
Chart (2010)	Position
US Top Latin Albums (Billboard)	23

== Credits ==
- Album Produced by: Rudy Pérez
- Executive Producer: Rick Stevens
- Co-Executive Producer: Marco Bissi
- Arrangements: Rudy Pérez
- Keyboards, Bass, Drums & Percussion Programming: Rudy Pérez
- Electric & acoustic guitars: Rudy Pérez
- Editing & Comp Engineer: Andrés Bermúdez
- Assistant Engineer: David López
- Mastered by: Bruce Weeden
- Recorded/Mixed at: The Record Plant, Los Angeles, California & The Beach House, Miami Beach, Florida
- Design; Package Design & Art Director: Chick Ciccarelli
