= Amor Quédate =

Single by Jencarlos Canela

from the album Búscame
- Released: September 14, 2009
- Recorded: 2009
- Studio: The Beach House (Miami Beach, Florida)
- Genre: Latin pop · Latin ballad
- Length: 3:41
- Label: Bullseye Records
- Songwriter: Rudy Pérez
- Producer: Rudy Pérez

Jencarlos Canela singles chronology
"Amor Quédate" (2009)	"Búscame" (2010)

Amor Quédate (English: Love Stay) Is the debut single released by Cuban-American singer-songwriter and actor Jencarlos Canela, written and produced by Rudy Pérez, from his upcoming debut studio album Búscame (2009). The song is one of the themes from Telemundo Telenovela's Más Sabe el Diablo.

Jencarlos thought this was a good romantic theme love song, to promote his new album.

== Charts ==
Chart (2009)	Peak position
US Hot Latin Songs (Billboard)	28
U.S. Tropical Songs (Billboard)	30

== Single ==
1. Amor Quédate (Album Version) – 3:41

== iTunes Single – EP ==
iTunes Official Released

1. Amor Quédate (Album Version) – 3:41
2. Amor Quédate (Unplugged Version) – 3:39
3. Amor Quédate (Music Video) – 3:41

== Official Versions & Remixes ==
1. Amor Quédate (Album Version) – 3:41
2. Amor Quédate (Club Version) – 3:34
3. Amor Quédate (Unplugged Version) – 3:41
4. Amor Quédate (Salsa Version) – 4:50
