= Luis Fernando Bohórquez =

Colombian actor

Luis Fernando Bohórquez (born in Bogotá, Colombia), is a Colombian actor.

== Career ==
Was born in Bogotá, Colombia, He studied at the school of dramatic arts and began working as an actor playing small parts in a few films as Colpo di Stadium. Later gained notoriety taking part with featured roles in several telenovelas such as Historias de hombres sólo para mujeres and La Saga, Negocio de Familia.

Meanwhile, he also obtained some roles in films, including that of the main character of Buscando a Miguel. In 2011 was the male lead in the horror film Wake Up and Die and later worked in some television series.

In addition to working as an actor, Bohórquez dedicates itself to activities of sculptor.

== Filmography ==
=== Film ===
Year	Title	Role	Notes
1998	Golpe de estadio	Kidnapped #3	
2000	En mi reloj siempre son las 5 y 15		Short film
2004	Colombianos, un acto de fe		Short film
2005	La gente honrada		
2007	Buscando a Miguel	Miguel Villalobos	Lead role
2009	Los tiempos muertos	Atracador	Short film
2011	Volver a morir	Darió	Lead role
2011	Lecciones para un beso	Rafael Colmenares	

=== Television ===
Year	Title	Role	Notes
1995	Solo una mujer	Iván	
1999	La dama del pantano		
2000	Heroes de turno		
2001	Historias de hombres sólo para mujeres	Manuel	Main cast
2004	La saga: Negocio de familia	Antonio Manrique	Supporting role
2006	Amores de Mercado	Hernán Duarte	Supporting role
2007	Zorro: La espada y la rosa	Javier	Episode: "The Story Begins"
2007	Pocholo	Pedro	
2008	La traición	Armando de Medina	Supporting role
2008-09	Sin senos no hay paraíso	Osvaldo Ternera	Supporting role
2009	Verano en Venecia	Lolo	1 episode
2010	La Diosa Coronada		1 episode
2010	Operación Jaque	Ricardo	Episode: "El secuestro" Episode: "El rescate"
2010	Bella calamidades	Samuel	Episode: "Llegada de Javier Casales"
2011	La Mariposa	Senador Juan Ángel Monsalve	Supporting role
2011	Kdabra	Álvaro	5 episodes
2012	Lynch	Lieutenant Ricardo Ochoa Burgos	7 episodes
