= Undercover Law =

Columbian drama TV series

- Spanish: La ley secreta
- Genre: Drama
- Directed by: Andrés Beltrán; Carlos Mario Urrea; Mateo Stivelberg; Jhon Barrios
- Starring: Viña Machado; Luna Baxter; Juana del Río; Valeria Galviz; Tommy Vásquez; Luis Mesa; Katherine Vélez; Variel Sánchez; Ricardo Vesga; Juan Manuel Mendoza
- Country of origin: Colombia
- Original language: Spanish
- No. of seasons: 1
- No. of episodes: 60

Production
- Executive producer: Juliana Barrera
- Production company: Caracol Televisión

Original release
- Network: Netflix
- Release: 31 August 2018

Undercover Law (Spanish title: La ley secreta) is a Colombian drama television series produced by Caracol Televisión that premiered via streaming on 31 August 2018 on Netflix. It stars Viña Machado, Luna Baxter, Juana del Río, Valeria Galviz, Tommy Vásquez, Luis Mesa, Katherine Vélez, Variel Sánchez, Ricardo Vesga, and Juan Manuel Mendoza. The series is based on a group of women who form a special police force. The production of the series began on 30 October 2017 and it is available in 4K ultra-high-definition television.

It was released through Caracol Televisión from Colombia on 1 October 2019 to January 3, 2020.

== Cast ==
- Viña Machado as Sandra Medina
- Luna Baxter as Tatiana Ariza
- Juana del Río as Amelia Gómez
- Valeria Galviz as María Alejandra Álvarez Bernal
- Sara Pinzón as Kimberly
- Tommy Vásquez as Juan Pablo Davila
- Luis Mesa as Cristobal Porto
- Katherine Vélez as María Emma Maldonado Vargas
- Variel Sánchez as Lerner Jr.
- Ricardo Vesga as Rodrigo Mendez
- Juan Manuel Mendoza as Eduardo Celis
- Camilo Amores as Sergio Gómez
- Tata Ariza as Jenifer Carriazo
- Toto Vega as Francisco Correa
- Wilderman Garcia Buitrago as Diego
- Marcela Vanegas as Marcela Rojas
- Manuela González as Catalina
- Tatiana Rentería as Genoveva
- Patrick Delmas as Simon Binoche
- Maria Cecilia Botero as Bertha
