= El Laberinto de Alicia =

El Laberinto de Alicia may refer to:

- El Laberinto de Alicia (Chilean TV series), a 2011 Chilean action television series
- El laberinto de Alicia (Colombian TV series), a 2014 Colombian telenovela, based on the above
