= Juan Manuel Mendoza =

Colombian actor

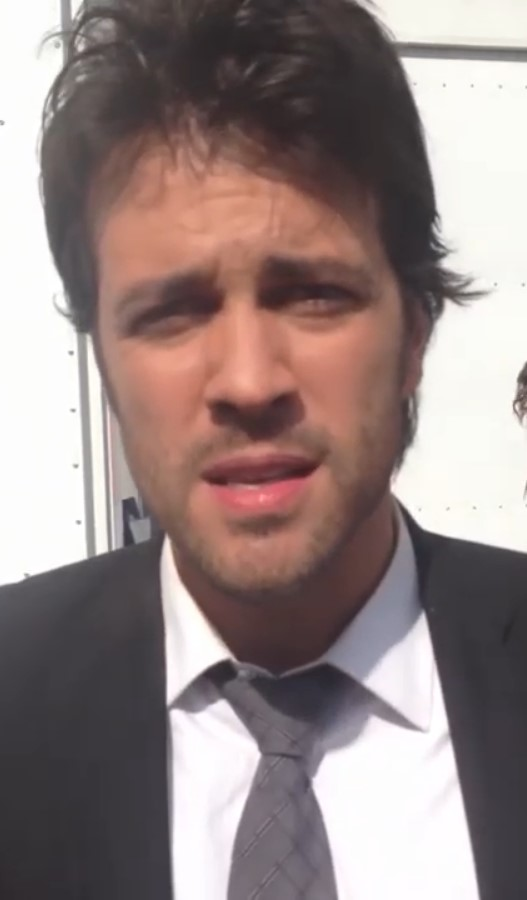
- Born: October 26, 1980 (age 45); Cali, Colombia
- Occupation: Actor
- Years active: 2006–present
- Children: 1

Juan Manuel Mendoza, is a Colombian television actor, known for his work in telenovelas. such as, A corazón abierto, an adaptation of the American medical drama Grey's Anatomy. His role as Esteban Sanínt in La Traicionera, adaptation of the Argentine telenovela Malparida. and for his outstanding roles in Dulce amor as Julián and The Girl. as Dr. Rodrigo Carrera. His most recent project was in 2018 in the Netflix series La Ley Secreta (otherwise known as Undercover Law) where he gave life to Eduardo Celis Alias el Halcón.

== Filmography ==
Year	Title	Role	Notes
2006	Floricienta	Matías	
2009	El penúltimo beso	Ernesto Izquierdo	
2010–2011	A corazón abierto	Jorge Viana	
2011–2012	La Traicionera	Esteban Sanint	
2013–2015	Cumbia Ninja	Martín Mondino	
2014	Niche, Lo que diga el corazón	Amadeo López	
2014	Dulce amor	Julián	
2016	The Girl	Rodrigo Carrera	
2017	El Señor de los Cielos	Andrés Velandia	5 episodes
2018	La ley secreta	El halcon	60 episodes
2019	Siempre Bruja		
2023–2024	The Influencer	Salvador Sarabia	
