= Angeline Moncayo =

Colombian actress and model

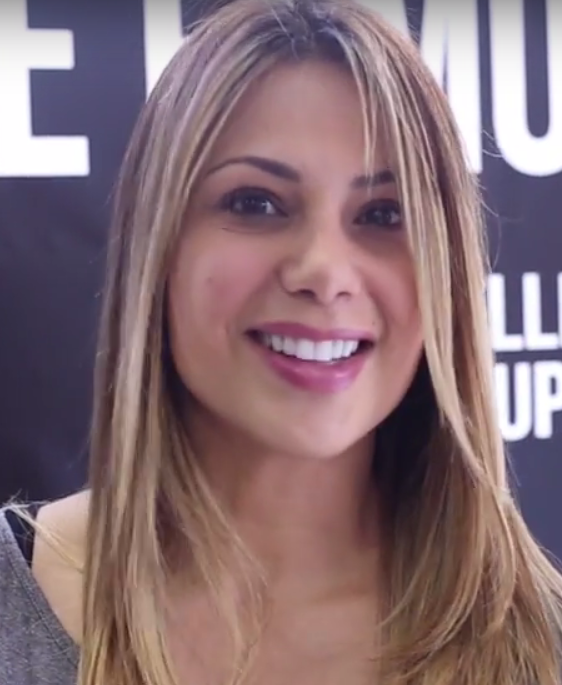
- Born: Angelly Vanessa Moncayo; November 4, 1979 (age 47); Santiago de Cali, Colombia
- Occupations: Actress, entrepreneur
- Years active: 1997–present
- Spouse: Sergio Faggiani (?-?)

Angeline Moncayo (born Angelly Vanessa Moncayo on November 4, 1979) is a Colombian actress and model.

== Filmography ==
Telenovelas
Year	Title	Role	Notes
1997	Pandillas, Guerra y Paz	Valentina	Special Appearance
1998-01	Padres e Hijos	Violeta	Supporting Role
1999-01	Yo soy Betty, la fea	Karina Larson	Recurring Character
2000	A donde va Soledad	Felicia	Supporting Role
2000-01	La Baby Sister	Sofía Pelvis	Supporting Role
2002	Noticias calientes	Tatiana "Tati" Munevar	Supporting Role
2002-03	Siete veces Amada	Dra. Isabela	Supporting Role
2003	Retratos	Alejandra	Supporting Role
2007	Dame Chocolate	María Sánchez	Supporting Role
2008-09	La Dama de Troya	Melinda Contreras	Supporting Role
2008-09	Sin Senos no Hay Paraíso		Special Appearance
2008-10	El Cartel	Giselle	Supporting Role
2009-10	Más sabe el diablo	Marina Suárez/Mario	Supporting Role
2010	La diosa coronada	Zulma	Supporting Role
2011-12	Flor Salvaje	Correcaminos/Elena	Supporting Role
2012-13	Corazón valiente	Maria Laura Aguilar Flores de Ponte	Co-protagonist
2013	Dama y obrero	Gemma Pacheco Maldonado	Supporting Role
2016	LA Viuda Negra 2		supporting role
