= The Mafia Dolls =

Colombian television series

- Genre: Telenovela
- Created by: Andrés López; Juan Camilo Ferrand
- Based on: Las fantásticas by Andrés López and Juan Camilo Ferrand
- Directed by: Luis Alberto Restrepo
- Creative director: Guarnizo Lizarralde
- Opening theme: "Dame tu amor" by Lisaumet and Rap Topo
- Country of origin: Colombia
- Original language: Spanish
- No. of seasons: 2
- No. of episodes: 118

Production
- Executive producer: Cristina Palacio Pombo
- Editors: Fabián Rodríguez; Isabel Cristina Méndez
- Camera setup: Multi-camera

Original release
- Network: Caracol Televisión
- Release: 28 September 2009 – 8 March 2010
- Network: Netflix
- Release: 15 March 2019

The Mafia Dolls (Spanish: Las muñecas de la mafia) is a Colombian telenovela created by Andrés López and Juan Camilo Ferrand and that premiered on Caracol Televisión on 28 September 2009, based on the book Las fantásticas written by the same creators of the series.

On 10 October 2017 it was confirmed that the series would be revived for a second season produced by Caracol Televisión for Netflix, and it released except Colombia on 15 March 2019. The second season of the series aired on Caracol Television from July 8, 2019 to September 30, 2019.

== Series overview ==
Series	Episodes	Originally released		
Series	Episodes	First released	Last released	Network
1	58	28 September 2009	8 March 2010	Caracol Televisión
2	60	15 March 2019		Netflix

== Plot ==
The story deals with the lives of five young friends, Brenda, Olivia, Violeta, Renata and Pamela, who live in the fictional Colombian town of "El Carmen." Throughout the series, they become further and further embroiled in inextricable situations because of their involvement with drug king-pin, Braulio Bermudez, his family and his lieutenants. Bermudez, played by the veteran Colombian actor, Fernando Solórzano, is a "capo" operating out of "El Carmen."

Pamela immigrates to the United States of America to try to get away from trouble and be near her father, who was a pilot and ended up in prison because he was captured by the DEA flying cocaine to the United States. She ends up as a maid but tells Brenda she is happy and having a great life.

Olivia ends up in getting eight years in jail, for having a fake wedding with the notorious Braulio Bermudez, and acquiring some of his property.

Violeta dies when, after Braulio's, now led by Norman since Braulio is in jail, local cartel decides to have a treaty with Nicanor’s cartel.

Renata also dies because, to repay money she owed him, Erick, a former henchman of Braulio, forces her to carry drugs to the United States in her stomach. None of her loved ones ever find out about her death because she has no identification on her person.

Brenda ends up carrying Braulio's child, but he is captured, extradited and sent to a US prison, so that she never sees him again.

== Cast ==
=== Main ===
- Amparo Grisales as Lucrecia Rivas
- Fernando Solórzano as Braulio Bermúdez
- Angélica Blandón as Brenda Navarrete
- Katherine Escobar as Olivia
- Yuly Ferreira as Renata Gómez
- Alejandra Sandoval as Violeta Manrique
- Andrea Gómez as Pamela Rojas
- Andrea Guzmán as Noelia de
- Diego Vásquez as Norman Alberto Zarama
- Julián Román as Erick González
- Juan Pablo Franco as Leonel Giraldo
- Lincoln Palomeque as Giovanni Rosales
- Marcela Valencia as Ximena
- Jessica Sanjuan as Guadalupe Bermudez
- Aura Helena Prada as Carina de Manrique
- María Claudia Torrez as Melisa
- Orlando Valenzuela as Gregorio Manrique
- Mauricio Vélez as Asdrúbal López The Buddha
- Félix Antequera as Nicanor Pedraza
- Julián Arango as Claudio Pedraza
- Carla Giraldo as Janeth
- Paola Rey as Brenda Navarrete
- Juan Carlos Messier as Raúl Jiménez
- Sebastián Peterson as Amín Martínez
- Vicky Hernández as Flor de Navarrete
- Paula Barreto as Martha
- Gary Forero as Orlando Páez
- Juan Manuel Restrepo as Kenny
- Carlos Kajú as William Toledo
- Edwin Maya as Arturo
- Adriana Osorio as Aurora de Gómez
- Jason Chad as DEA Agent
- Camilo Sáenz
- Rodolfo Silva
- Norma Nivia
- Lina Nieto
- Roger Moreno
- Felipe Bernadette

=== Recurring ===
- Julián Caicedo as Uña (season 1)
- Jairo Ordóñez as Mugre (season 1)
- Alejandro López as Alejo (season 1)
- Andrés Sandoval as Nicolás (season 1)
- Franklin Gutierrez as a Prisoner (season 2)
- Jennifer Leibovici as Magaly (season 2)
