= Julián Román =

Colombian actor (born 1977)

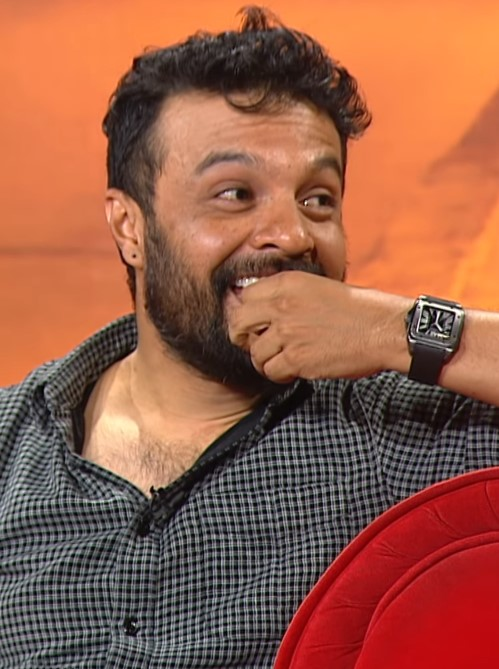
- Román in 2017
- Born: Julián Edgardo Román Rey; 23 November 1977 (age 48); Bogota, Colombia
- Occupation: Actor
- Years active: 1988–present

Julián Edgardo Román Rey (born November 23, 1977) is a Colombian actor, has been involved in theater, film and television.

== Biography ==
His father, actor José Edgardo Román (1950–2022), played Mario Arboleda, the equivalent of Mike Ehremantraut, in the Spanish-language Colombian remake of Breaking Bad, titled Metástasis. Julian was born in Bogota. He began his very young training through ongoing workshops at the district school drama Luis Enrique Osorio, and then continued drama studies, use of space and body language in popular theater in Bógota TPB with renowned teachers such as Adelaida Nieto, Carolina Vivas, Ignacio Rodriguez and Rosario Jaramillo, as well as the theatrical art research laboratory "Take Action" of his father the actor Edgardo Román.

== Filmography ==
=== Film roles ===
Year	Title	Roles	Notes
2003	La primera noche	Wilson	

=== Television roles ===
Year	Title	Roles	Notes
1976	Recordarás mi nombre	Baby	
1991	Cuando quiero llorar no lloro	Young El Negro	
1998	Felisa Romero	The Policeman	Television film
1999	Me llaman Lolita	Lalo Bocanegra	
1999	¿Por qué diablos?	Elías "La Chanda" Guerra	
2001	Amor a mil	Kevin Abelardo McKenzie	
2002–2004	Francisco el matemático	Byron Beltrán	
2005–2006	Los Reyes	Leonardo "Leo" Giovanny Reyes	Main role; 241 episodes
2007–2008	Tiempo final	Inspector Morales / Mono	Episodes: "Malos socios" and "Crimenes legales"
2008–2009	Valentino el argentino	Valentino	Main role; 120 episodes
2009–2010	The Mafia Dolls	Erick	Main role (season 1); 58 episodes
2009–2010	La bella Ceci y el imprudente	Primo González	Main role; 120 episodes
2012–2013	Corazones blindados	Nehemías "Neme" Solipa	Main role; 139 episodes
2013	Tres Caínes	Carlos Castaño "El Comandante"	Main role; 79 episodes
2014–2016	La viuda negra	Richi	Main role (season 1); guest role (season 2)
2015	Lady, la vendedora de rosas	Treinta y ocho	Guest role
2016	Hasta que te conocí	Juan Gabriel	Main role; 15 episodes
2017	El Comandante	Carlos Uzcátegui	Main role; 102 episodes
2018	Nadie me quita lo bailao	Beto Pérez	Main role; 49 episodes
2019	Crime Diaries: Night Out	Salazar	5 episodes
2019–2020	El General Naranjo	El Liso	Main role (seasons 1–3); 52 episodes
2019–2020	El Señor de los Cielos	Joaquín Estrella	Main role (season 7); 69 episodes
2020–2021	De brutas, nada	Guillermo Roble	Main role

== Awards and nominations ==
Year	Award	Category	Nominated works	Result	Ref.
2003	Premios India Catalina	Best Supporting Actor	Francisco el matemático	Won	
2006	Premios India Catalina	Best Supporting Actor	Los Reyes	Nominated	
2006	Premios TVyNovelas (Colombia)	Best Supporting Actor	Los Reyes	Won	
2010	Premios India Catalina	Best actor of soap opera	La bella Ceci y el imprudente	Won	
2010	Premios India Catalina	Best Supporting Actor	Las muñecas de la mafia	Nominated	
2013	Premios India Catalina	Best actor telenovela antagonistic or series	Corazones blindados	Won	
2014	Premios India Catalina	Serial best actor	Tres Caínes	Nominated	
2014	Premios TVyNovelas (Colombia)	Serial best actor	Tres Caínes	Nominated	
2014	Premios TVyNovelas (Colombia)	Best Supporting Actor Series	La Prepago	Nominated	
