= The Influencer =

- Genre: Telenovela
- Created by: Héctor Rodríguez Cuéllar
- Written by: Alexandra Ortíz; Deisy Cardona; Angela González
- Directed by: Andrés Marroquín; Daniel Arenas Samudio
- Starring: Mariana Goméz; Juan Manuel Mendoza
- Theme music composer: Mariana Goméz; Andrea Múnoz "Amuna"; Pablo Ocampo; Nico Legreti
- Opening theme: "Tan Perfecto" by Mariana Goméz & Juan Manuel Mendoza
- Composers: Samuel Lizarralde; Jose Ricaurte Ardila
- Country of origin: Colombia
- Original language: Spanish
- No. of seasons: 1
- No. of episodes: 60

Production
- Executive producer: Juan Carlos Villamizar Delgado
- Cinematography: Sonia Pérez Castro; Edwinson Riaño
- Editor: Wilmar Muñoz Garay
- Production company: Caracol Televisión

Original release
- Network: Netflix
- Release: 13 December 2023 – 21 February 2024

The Influencer (Spanish: La influencer) is a Colombian telenovela created by Héctor Rodríguez Cuéllar and produced by Caracol Televisión. It premiered on Netflix on 13 December 2023. The series stars Mariana Goméz and Juan Manuel Mendoza.

== Plot ==
The series follows Maritza, an aspiring influencer who has a speech disorder. She decides to make a viral video to establish herself and help her father, who is struggling financially. Germen, her boyfriend, suggests her to do an extreme stunt, which she agrees to. However, he betrays her during the broadcast and the whole thing goes wrong. The incident tarnishes Maritza's reputation and from then on she has to work hard to restore her image while dealing with the repercussions and her haters on the internet.

== Cast ==
- Mariana Goméz as María Isabel "Maritza" Matallana
- Juan Manuel Mendoza as Salvador Sarabia
- Luna Baxter as Avril
- Carlos "Pitty" Camacho as Nibardo
- Camilo Amores as Peluche
- Marcela Agudelo as Teresa
- Andrea Gúzman as Yesenia
- Felipe Calero as Quique
- Norma Nivia as Laura
- Daniel Rodríguez as Polo
- Ivan Rodríguez as Castor
- Leonardo Acosta as Aldo
- Alexandra Restrepo as Martha
- José Daniel Cristancho as Nacho
- Paula Estrada as Mafe
- Xilena Aycardi as Paloma
- Viviana Santos as Kamila
- Fiona Horsey as Aida
- Edwin Maya as Germen
