= Eduardo Cuervo =

Mexican actor

Eduardo Cuervo (born August 2, 1977, in Guadalajara, Jalisco) is a Mexican actor. He is best known for his participation in various telenovelas produced by Televisa, such as Abrázame muy fuerte, Amigas y Rivales, and Mujer de Madera.

== Career ==
In 2006, he started working in Telemundo produced serials such as Tierra de Pasiones, shot in Miami, FL, and in 2007 he was part of the young cast of Telemundo's upcoming Pecados Ajenos.
