= Cristal Marie =

- Born: May 26, 1986 (age 40); Santo Domingo, Dominican Republic
- Genre: Latin
- Occupations: Singer; songwriter; actress
- Instrument: Vocals
- Years active: 2005–present
- Label: Independent
- Website: cristalmarie.tumblr.com

Cristal Marie (born May 26, 1986) is a Dominican singer, songwriter, actress and performer who is best known for singing the opening theme of the North American telenovela "Pecados Ajenos" by Telemundo alongside Cuban-American singer Jencarlos Canela.

She has won the Casandra Award (Dominican Republic's highest Honor in the music industry) a Berklee College of Music Award and her song "Confieso" was selected as a winner by the 17th Annual Billboard World Song Contest and as a finalist of the International Songwriting Competition (ISC). She also wrote the soundtrack for the independent film "Sin Social", winner of the Platinum Reel Award at the Nevada Film Festival of 2009. In 2010 she won the Youth Achievement Latin Pride National Award.
