= ¿Por qué diablos? =

- Created by: Gilma Peña; Nubia Barreto
- Developed by: Cenpro TV
- Directed by: Sergio Osorio
- Starring: Manolo Cardona; Victor Mallarino; Marcela Carvajal
- Opening theme: «Reina de mi alma» (Gotas de Rap)
- Ending theme: «Reina de mi alma» (Gotas de Rap)
- Country of origin: Colombia
- Original language: Spanish
- No. of episodes: 126

Production
- Producer: Manuel Peñaloza
- Production location: Colombia
- Camera setup: Multi-camera
- Running time: 40 minutes

Original release
- Network: Canal Uno
- Release: 1 July 1999 – 5 July 2000

Related
- Más Sabe el Diablo

¿Por qué diablos? (literally "Why Devils?", although it can also mean Why the hell?, itself a pun on the main character's nickname, "Diablo") is a 1999-2000 Colombian telenovela produced by Cenpro TV and broadcast on Canal Uno. It starred Manolo Cardona, Marcela Carvajal, Paola Rey, and Victor Mallarino. It was directed by Sergio Osorio.

The telenovela focuses on a poor teenage boy named Juan Cantor (A.K.A. Juan Diablo), part of an international ring of underage thieves. After his best friend dies in a shooting, he decides to avenge his friend's death by killing the head of the organization, La Araña (The Spider). He uses his skills to gain the trust of the Leader and that way gets closer to him. The young man is later sent to a juvenile facility, and there, he falls in love with his psychologist who was also the wife of his boss.

As of May 2008 Telemundo was planning on including a remake of the series in its 2008-09 U.S. prime-time television lineup. It later came to be known as Más Sabe el Diablo, broadcast in 2009.

== Cast ==
- Manolo Cardona as Juan 'Diablo' Cantor
- Marcela Carvajal as Ángela Falla de Carbonell
- Víctor Mallarino as Eduardo 'La Araña' Carbonell
- Paola Andrea Rey as Jazmín 'Jaz' Cordero
- Marcela Gallego as Teresa Cantor
- Consuelo Luzardo as Purita de Carbonell
- Frank Ramírez as Boris Mondragón
- Diego Trujillo as Martín Pedraza
- Carlos Congote as Federico Ponce
- Quique Mendoza as Toño Mondragón
- Ramiro Meneses as Juvenal Torres Useche
- Walter Díaz as Reinerio 'Doggie' Palacios
- Agahta Monazzani as Luisa Carbonell Falla
- Maribel Abello as Claudia Riascos
- Johnny Acero as Aurelio 'Gaviota' Restrepo
- Pilar Álvarez as Faustina "Tina" Cordero
- Jaime Barbini as Samir Riascos
- Jorge Iván Duarte as Freddy 'Gordo' Cordero
- Juan Manuel Gallego as Jhon Freddy 'El Trompo'
- Javier Gnecco as Juan Eduardo Carbonell
- Adriana López as Lili Chaparro
- Gonzalo Zagarminaga as Jordain Simenon
- María José Martínez as Cata
- César Navarro as Ignacio Álvarez 'El Ñato'
- Cecilia Navia as Genoveva Arbeláez
- Freddy Ordóñez as Jesús 'Chucho' Ortiz
- Inés Oviedo as Marlenis de Torres
- Humberto Rivera as Ancizar Gordillo
- Néstor Alfonso Rojas as 'El guajiro'
- Edgardo Román as Edilberto Otálora 'Don Carlitos'
- Julián Román as Rubén 'La Chanda' Guerra
- Jorge Rubiano as Edgar 'La Rata' Romero
- Carolina Trujillo as Lía de Falla
- Germán Castelblanco/Fernando Arévalo as Coronel Arbeláez
- Patricia Tamayo as Martica
- Elkin Córdoba as Fortunato Palacios

== Reception ==
The series is considered an example of depiction of the violence in Colombian society.
