= Ángel de la guarda, mi dulce compañía =

Television program

- Genre: Telenovela; Drama
- Written by: Adriana Barreto; Paola Cazarez
- Directed by: Diego Mejia
- Starring: Diego Ramos; Manuela González; Carlos Ponce; Orlando Miguel; Marcela Angarita; Enrique Carriazo; Ana Bolena Mesa
- Countries of origin: United States; Colombia
- Original language: Spanish
- No. of episodes: 122

Production
- Producer: Dago García
- Production location: Bogotá
- Running time: 42-45 minutes

Original release
- Network: Telemundo; Caracol Televisión
- Release: September 15, 2003 – July 23, 2004

Ángel de la guarda, mi dulce compañía is a Colombian telenovela produced by RTI for Caracol Televisión and Telemundo.

== Cast ==
- Manuela González as Carolina Falla
- Diego Ramos as Miguel Ángel Cruz
- Carlos Ponce as Gustavo Almansa
- Orlando Miguel as Fernando Azula
- Marcela Angarita as Alejandra Valencia
- Juan Carlos Vargas as John Jairo
- Rosemary Bohórquez as Nora "Norita"
- Enrique Carriazo as Benigno Perales
- Natasha Díaz as Yolanda
- Mario Duarte as Rafael
- Hugo Gómez as Antonio Falla
- Sebastián Martínez as John F. Kennedy "Kenny" Perales
- Ana Bolena Meza as Mariela de Perales
- Jorge Arturo Pérez as Brocoli
- Sandra Pérez as Luisa Falla
- Eliana Piñeros as Manuela
- Juan Pablo Barragán as Ricardo
- Sebastian Peterson as Arturo
- Ana María Trujillo as Diana
- Flor Trujillo
- Ginna Acuña
