= Pecados ajenos =

- From left to right: Manuel, Inés, Natalia, Adrián, Elena and Rogelio
- Genre: Romance - Action, Comedy drama, Black humor
- Created by: Eric Vonn
- Developed by: Telemundo Studios, Miami
- Directed by: David Posada; Danny Gavidia
- Starring: Lorena Rojas; Mauricio Islas; Sonya Smith; Catherine Siachoque; Ariel López Padilla; Sebastián Ligarde; Lupita Ferrer; Daniel Lugo; Maritza Rodríguez
- Theme music composer: Alberto Slezynger; Pablo Cáceres; Lalo Paredes Bolarte
- Opening theme: "Dibujemos un Mundo" Performed by Cristal Marie and Jencarlos Canela
- Ending theme: "Sin ti, no sé" Performed by Lorena Rojas
- Country of origin: United States
- Original language: Spanish
- No. of episodes: 167

Production
- Executive producer: Aurelio Valcárcel Carroll
- Producer: Martha Godoy
- Production locations: Miami, Florida
- Camera setup: Multi-camera
- Running time: 42 minutes

Original release
- Network: Telemundo
- Release: October 8, 2007 – June 13, 2008

Related
- Dame Chocolate; Sin Senos no hay Paraíso

Pecados ajenos (A Chance to Love, literally "Other people's sins") is a Spanish-language telenovela written by Eric Vonn and produced by the United States–based television network Telemundo. This limited-run series was shot in Florida by Telemundo Studios, Miami. It is also known as A Chance to Love.

Pecados Ajenos replaced Amor Mío in Telemundo's 10 p.m. (ET/PT) time slot on October 8, 2007. Lorena Rojas and Mauricio Islas were paired together for the first time in this saga of love, marriage, betrayal, parenthood, friendship and passion.

It stars Lorena Rojas and Mauricio Islas; With the antagonistic participations of Sonya Smith, Catherine Siachoque, Ariel López Padilla, Lupita Ferrer and Sebastián Ligarde with the stellar performances of Alicia Plaza, Carlos Camacho, Mildred Quiroz, Chela Arias, Raúl Izaguirre, Maritza Rodríguez, Hannah Zea, Jencarlos Canela, Mariana Torres, Alonso Espeleta, Pablo Portillo, Roberto Plantier, Tali Duclaud and Ximena Duque.

The show was launched, for example, in Poland on Puls TV and in Romania on Acasa TV. In Georgia, channel Rustavi 2 broadcast the novel.

Vonn penned this urban melodrama set in West Palm Beach and Pompano Beach. It features star-crossed lovers who fall in love at the worst possible moment. The show dealt with topics such as homosexuality and homophobia in Hispanic culture, date rape and marital rape, drug addiction and alcoholism, domestic violence, prostitution, abortion, incest, the dangers of religious fanaticism, illegal immigration, mental disorders like schizophrenia and multiple personality disorder, animal cruelty, and the corruption and abuse in women's prisons.

As with most of its telenovelas, the network broadcast English subtitles as closed captions on CC3. Many scenes were shot on location in Virginia Key.

== Telemundo's Story Synopsis ==
Natalia and Adrián are strangers who live in different cities but discover in an instant that they belong together. They were both married to other spouses for more than twenty years, and each has two beautiful young children. Their lives are quite similar—and both are unhappy and frustrated. Destiny brings the two together when they are each on the verge of divorce.

When the pair falls madly in love, they face opposition from Elena (Adrián Matia's hysterical, paranoid and resentful wife), Rogelio, Natalia alcoholic husband who humiliates her, and Inés, who envies and hates Natalia while pretending to be her friend. Meanwhile, Ágata, Natalia's despotic mother-in-law, terrorizes the heroine's life and has stripped her of the fortune which she inherited from her parents. Ágata teams up with Manuel, a treacherous and ambitious villain, to plot Natalia's worst tragedy: separating her from her most beloved treasure, her children.

Natalia and Adrián search for love, companionship, and fulfillment. In the end, it is revealed that the entire story was a dream of Natalia Gaby's while she was in a two-year coma.

== Plot ==
The story begins in West Palm Beach, Florida, when Natalia decides to leave her husband, Rogelio. She is tired of twenty years of domestic violence and marital rape by Rogelio and the constant insults of threats by Ágata, her mother-in-law. Natalia informs Ágata and Rogelio that she and her kids are leaving the mansion that night and that the legal divorce will be taken care of days after. Intent on teaching Natalia a lesson, Ágata calls Inés (Natalia'supposed best friend who actually despises Natalia) and the two agree on carrying a plot they had been planning for months.

That night, Natalia goes to her friend Monica's going-away party at Inés' house. Monica, Natalia and Inés' friend, was hired at a job in Pompano Beach and will be leaving that night. At the party, Inés and Manuel (Inés'lover) spike Natalia's martini and, when she passes out, take Natalia to Inés' room where Manuel rapes her. Inés calls Ágata who arrives shortly after with Rogelio and Natalia's kids, Luis rodrigo and Gloria. From everyone's point of view, it appears as if Natalia and Manuel are having an affair and have just been caught in bed together, as no one believes it is rape. Rogelio, Luis Rodrigo and Gloria, leave in tears with Ágata who thanks Inés. Natalia regains consciousness and breaks a lamp on Manuel's head in anger, killing him. Inés who Natalia still believes to be her friend and has no idea helped plan the whole thing, tells Natalia to run away because the police are coming. Natalia goes to Monica's house, who is packing up to leave for work, and explains everything that just happened. Monica tells Natalia that she should go to Pompano Beach with her while Inés clears up the misunderstanding with the police. Monica Natalia and Monica's friend Georgina leave for Pompano but have a car accident. Monica and Natalia are okay, but Georgina dies inside the exploding car. Because her body is left unrecognizable and because Natalia's ID is left inside the car with her, the police believe it is Natalia the one who is dead.

Meanwhile, in Pompano Beach, Adrian Torres, who works in a magazine ad marketing, is on the verge of divorce with his crazy wife Elena Torres after twenty years of a horrible marriage. Elena is obsessed with the idea of Adrian cheating on her and because of that has physically assaulted many women. Adrian frequents at work. What Adrian doesn't know is that Elena is mentally ill and is unaware that his wife actually has vivid hallucinations of him making out with other women. Nonetheless, Elena has become very dangerous and violent and Adrian believes it is best for him and their kids if they divorced as soon as possible.

Back in West Palm Beach, Ágata has made sure to fill her grandson and granddaughter's minds with lies about Natalia and Manuel's supposed affair. When they receive the news that Natalia died in a car crash while "escaping" to Pompano Beach, only Luis Rodrigo is devastated by the news. Though she never planned on killing Natalia, Ágata is glad about her reported death because that puts an end to the divorce issue. Had the divorce gone through, Natalia would have kept her fortune in its entirety, leaving Rogelio and Ágata with nothing. But now that Rogelio is widowed, he and Ágata have complete control of Natalia's estate. Additionally, Luis's life becomes a living hell at the mansion with Natalia's absence because he is gay and Rogelio beats him for it. Also, Inés discovers that Manuel is not actually dead but hears that Natalia is. However, Natalia gaby calls and Inés learns that she is alive. This foils Inés' plan, who was planning on seducing Rogelio and marrying him now that Natalia was dead. She tells Natalia to pretend to be dead for a while, while she sorts things out with the police, convincing Natalia that the minute she reveals she is alive, the police will arrest her for Manuel's death.

In Pompano, Natalia is staying at Monica's apartment and Monica is working at her job. Her boss is Adrian. One day Adrian pays a visit to Monica's apartment and meets Natalia, instantly becoming mesmerized by her beauty. But Elena has followed Adrian to the apartment. Convinced, in her insanity, that Natalia is another one of Adrian' lovers, Elena tries to shoot her with a handgun, but misses. Adrian apologizes for Elena's abnormal behavior and sends her to an asylum. Adrian and Elenas's kids, Freddy and Denisse (both in college but living at home), are saddened by the news of their mother in an asylum but understand it is for the best. They, too, are going through their own personal problems. Denisse, the oldest, is pregnant by her boyfriend Ricky, who forced her to sleep with him. Freddy who really likes a girl named Maria who always evades him, finds out Maria and her mother are abused and beat at home by Maria's father, a violent sexist man named Anselmo.

Back in West Palm Beach, Inés flor and Rogelio are now married. Ágata, because Inés helped her set up Natalia's rape, is fine with the marriage. Charlie, Inés' son, and Gloria, Rogelio and Natalia' s daughter, like each other but Ágata disapproves of the relationship and the two start dating in secret. Ágata forbids the relationships because Inés has told her that Charlie is actually Rogelio 's son, a product of a short romance Inés and Rogelio had twenty years ago before his marriage to Natalia. Gloria gets pregnant, hoping that a baby would be reason enough for Ágata for force marriage upon them, but upon learning they are siblings and have committed incest, she decides to abort and run away from home. She stays at Elsa's apartment, a friend of hers who ran away from home months ago because she couldn't stand seeing her parents argue all the time. Elsa confesses to Gloria that in order to pay for school and the apartment, she became a prostitute. Elsa convinces an emotionally weak Gloria to become a prostitute too. Natalia who has been keeping in touch with her son Luis all this time, learns from a series of events that Manuel is not dead and that Inés and Ágata her up. She and Adrian who are now unofficially going out, go to West Palm to confront Natalia's enemies. Meanwhile, Elena is out of the asylum.

== Cast ==
Actor	Personaje
Lorena Rojas	Natalia Ruiz Navarro de Mercenario / de Torres
Mauricio Islas	Adrián Torres
Sonya Smith	Elena Sandoval de Torres / de Mercenario
Catherine Siachoque	Inés Vallejo de Mercenacio
Ariel López Padilla	Rogelio Mercenario
Sebastián Ligarde	Manuel Zapata
Lupita Ferrer	Ágata de Mercenario
Daniel Lugo	Don Marcelo Mercenario
Maritza Rodríguez	Karen Vallejo
Alicia Plaza	Mónica Rojas de Ferrara
Carlos Camacho	Saúl Farrera
Chela Arias	Raquel Vda. de Sandoval
Raúl Izaguirre	Eduardo Larios
Mildred Quiroz	Laura de Aguilar
Roberto Huicochea	Anselmo Aguilar
Arianna Coltellacci	Isabella "Chabela"
Mayte Vilán	Marisela Bracamontes
Adela Romero	Melinda Vda. de Gamboa
Nury Flores	Lolita
Raúl Durán	Benito Alejo Gamboa Moctesuma
Mariana Torres	Denisse Torres Sandoval
Rosa de la Mora	Mayté Osorio
Sofía Stamatiades	Gloria Mercenario Ruiz
Alonso Espeleta	Luis Mercenario Ruiz
Jencarlos Canela	Alfredo "Freddy" Torres Sandoval
Roberto Plantier	Charlie Vallejo
Eduardo Cuervo	Ricardo "Ricky" Larios
Julio Ocampo	Ramón Gamboa
Giovanna del Portillo	Daniela
Héctor Soberón	Gary Mendoza
Evelin Santos	Gasparina Godoy
Hannah Zea	Rossy Rojas
Andrés García Jr.	Javier Alfaro
Adela Romero	Melinda
Raúl Durán	Benito Alejo Gamboa Moctesuma
Pablo Portillo	Héctor Acecas
Ximena Duque	María Aguilar
Tali Duclaud	Elsa Alfaro
Natalie Correa	Lucía
Rudy Pavón	Jaime
Ronny Montemayor	Benny Russian
Daniela Vildosola	Angélica Acecas
Ramiro Terán	Fernando Acecas
Claudia Arroyave	Nidia
Carlos Farach	Roberto
Julio Arredondo	Dr. Martínez
Stella Maris Ortiz	Georgina
Eric Santa	
Lorenzo Gómez	
Fabio Melanito	
Lupita Jones	Esmeralda (Actuación Especial)
Daniel René	Antonio "Tony"
Enrique Herrera	Horacio
Ivee Colón	Teresa
Lorenzo Duarte	
Carlos Garin	Norberto
Andrés Mistage	Jeremy
Nelson Steegers	Daniel "Danny"
Cristina Figarola	Lisa Fuentes
Iván Hernández	
Luís Rivas	Diego
Carlos Pítela	Padre Julián
Jorge Hernández	
Xavier Coronel	Marcos Reyes
Giselle Duque	Doris
Ramón Morell	Dr. Solovich
Katherine Fuenmayor	Jenny
Cristian Carabias	Tito
José del Río	Mr. Moore
Esther Orjuela	Actuación Especial"
Ivan Rodríguez Naranjo	Dr. Beltrán
Guadalupe Hernández	Esteban
Jorge Laraburre	Jonathan "Johnny"
Steve Roth	Antonio Sandoval
Alejandro Orendain	Dr. Dorantes
Salim Rubiales	Alejandro
René Gatica	Rogelio Bustamante
Marcos Miranda	Jiménez
Luis Celeiro	Velázquez
Alexandro Danko	Óscar
Nelson Tallaferro	Pedro
Esteban Villareal	Dr. Salvatierra
Sandra Eichler	Tina
Riczabeth Sobalvarro	Dora
Diana Franco	Dolores "Lola"
Gabriel Traversari	Rolando Ortega
Jaime Pavón	Luciano Meléndez
Nelsón Díaz	Eleazar Aguilar
Juan Jiménez	Maximiliano Aranda
Alcira Gil	Amanda
Leandro Fernández

== Changes ==
When Telemundo announced this project in its 2007 upfront presentation, it was titled "El Otro Lado del Amor" ("The Other Side of Love"). The network then launched promotional teasers on July 2, 2007 calling the show "Pecados Ajenos". In addition there were multiple cast departures: Aylín Mújica as Ines Vallejo, Susana Dosamantes as Agata Mercernario, Alex Sirvent, Alfredo Torres (went to Madre Luna ), Géraldine Bazán as Gloria Mercernario (took a role in Victoria) and Alejandro Chabán who simply avoided playing a mild mannered homosexual teenager. Telemundo was quick to premiere Pecados Ajenos in order to replace a newly premiered telenovela Sin Verguenza due to the disappointing ratings it generated within the first two weeks at the time slot.

== International Broadcasters of Pecados ajenos ==
Pays	Chaîne	Titre	Premiere
United States	Telemundo	Pecados ajenos	08 octobre 2007
Dominican Republic	Tele Antillas	Pecados ajenos	
Romania	Acasa TV		17 novembre 2008
Poland	TV Puls	Meandry miłości	19 novembre 2008
Serbia	Prva Srpska Televizija	Љубав и грех	17 march 2008
Mexico	Nueve	Pecados ajenos	
Ecuador	Ecuavisa	Pecados ajenos	
Venezuela	RCTV	Pecados ajenos	
Colombia	RCN Televisión	Pecados ajenos	
Paraguay	SNT	Pecados ajenos	
Lithuania	LNK	Pecados ajenos	
Bolivia	Unitel	Pecados ajenos	
Georgia	Rustavi2		
Bulgaria	bTV	Чужди грехове	18 januari 2008
El Salvador	Canal 2	Pecados ajenos	
Honduras	Canal 6		
Panama	TVN		
Peru	ATV		
Guatemala	Canal 7		
Spain	LaSiete		
Hungary	RTL Klub	Bűnös szerelem	1 octobre 2012

== Production notes ==
Pecados Ajenos title card

Filming of Pecados Ajenos was scheduled to begin in July, 2007, with the debut expected in August. On the set in Southwest Ranches, Florida, the crew worked a 12-hour day, during which they shot one and a half episodes' worth of scenes. Locations included Davie, Wellington, Pompano Beach and Palm Beach, Florida. David Posada and Danny Gavidia directed the series.

=== Product Placement ===
As with many telenovelas it produces in-house, Telemundo used product placement within the show. Best Buy was to appear prominently in the show, with Adrian's son Alfredo working at one of the stores, but this never aired. Also, Toyota was to sponsor a 30-second replay of an important scene at the end of seven episodes. The Pledge and Windex cleaning products did appear in various scenes, as did Walgreens. The debut episode aired commercial-free and sponsored by Kraft Foods' DiGiorno frozen pizzas.
