= Angie Sanclemente Valencia =

Colombian model believed to be the leader of a drug trafficking operation

- Born: May 25, 1979 (age 47); Barranquilla, Colombia
- Other names: "Narco Queen" "Queen of Cocaine"
- Occupations: Model, beauty queen
- Status: Released on 27 September 2013
- Criminal charges: Drug trafficking and racketeering
- Penalty: 6 years imprisonment

Angie Sanclemente Valencia (born 25 May 1979) is a former Colombian beauty queen and lingerie model believed to be the ringleader of one of the world's largest drug syndicates.

== Background ==
Valencia is originally from Colombia. In 2000, she won a Colombian national qualifying competition for the Reinado Internacional del Café (International Queen of Coffee) beauty pageant, but was dethroned two days later when it was discovered that she was married. The title was then awarded to Ximena Andrea García Buitrago.

== Syndicate ==
Valencia's operation is believed to be a "rival empire" to that of her former boyfriend, a Mexican drug baron known as "The Monster". She formed her own cartel after splitting with him. She is alleged to have recruited other models as drug traffickers, whom she is quoted referring to as her "unsuspicious, beautiful angels," paying them up to around $5,000 (£3,200) per trip to transport cocaine from Argentina to England by way of Cancún.

== Investigation ==
Valencia's alleged syndicate was believed to have been exposed on 13 December 2009, when a 21-year-old woman, "Ariel L", was arrested with a suitcase containing 55 kg (121 pounds) of cocaine at Ezeiza International Airport, Buenos Aires, Argentina. "L" made no attempt to hide the drugs inside her bags, leading authorities to suspect the ring had help from employees. She is reported to have been told that no one at the airport would try to stop her, and an investigation was launched to find employees of the airport with possible links to the syndicate. After questioning "L", three additional arrests were made and a warrant was issued for Valencia's arrest. Authorities believed she was still in Argentina after she fled a hotel where she had been staying with her pomeranian. In March 2010 Interpol issued an international warrant for her arrest.

Valencia was finally arrested in Buenos Aires, Argentina, on May 26, 2010, while staying in a local hostel. Police reported that she had registered under a false name and had tried to alter her appearance by dyeing her hair blonde.

She was initially jailed on 27 May 2010 in the "Centro Federal de Detención de Mujeres Unidad número 31" in the city of Ezeiza, Province of Buenos Aires, Argentina. In October of the same year she was moved to the "Instituto Correccional de Mujeres Unidad número 3" also in Ezeiza after she suffered some violent attacks.

She was released from prison and deported back to Colombia on 27 September 2013 after serving only half of her original 6 year and 8-month prison sentence. She is banned from returning to Argentina.

== Popular culture ==
Her story inspired the TV series La Diosa Coronada, produced by RTI Producciones for Telemundo and Caracol Televisión, starring the Colombian model and actress Carolina Guerra as the character of Raquel Santamaría Cruz.
