= La bella Ceci y el imprudente =

Television series

- Genre: Telenovela; Drama
- Written by: César Betancourt; Adriana Barreto; Héctor Rodríguez
- Starring: Julián Román; Manuela González; Javier Gómez; Lincoln Palomeque
- Opening theme: "Cabezote" by Jox
- Country of origin: Colombia
- Original language: Spanish
- No. of seasons: 1
- No. of episodes: 183

Production
- Executive producer: Mauricio Ruiz
- Producer: Juan Carlos Villamizar
- Camera setup: Multi-camera
- Running time: 42-45 minutes

Original release
- Network: Caracol Televisión
- Release: November 23, 2009 – August 26, 2010

Related
- Cerro alegre La impostora

La bella Ceci y el imprudente, is a Colombian telenovela produced by Caracol Televisión. It stars Julián Román and Manuela González. It premiered on November 23, 2009 and ended on August 26, 2010, a total of 183 chapters. The telenovela continues to be a hit worldwide and has been licensed in 22 countries.

== Cast ==
| Actor (s) | Characters |
|---|---|
| Julián Román | Primo Gonzalez |
| Manuela González | Cecilia Ortiz |
| Javier Gómez | Eduardo Saenz Estrada |
| Jossara Jinaro | Kathy |
| Lincoln Palomeque | Juan Antonio Durán |
| Rita Bendeck | Silvia Ortiz |
| Margarita Reyes | Patricia Ortiz |
| Norma Nivia | Andrea Ortiz |
| César Mora | Don Alcides Combariza |
| Germán Escallón | Milton Alfredo Zafra Leguizamón |
| Julieth Restrepo | Myriam González |
| Fabián Mendoza | Arturo Enofain Combariza |
| Aura Helena Prada | Yadira |
| Yolanda Rayo | Janeth Raquel Bravo de Combariza |
| Paola Cairasco | Karen |
| Astrid Junguito | Tulia Vargas |
| Juan David Galindo | Jesus Emilio Rojas |
| Yesenia Valencia | Anabolena Suarez |
| Iván Forero | Herney Camilo Malo Zuñiga |
| Linda Carreño | Teresita Benitez |
| Camilo Sáenz | Alejo Cardona |
| Victor Turpin | Roberto Gonzalez |

== Awards and nominations ==
| Year | Award | Category | Nominated | Result |
|---|---|---|---|---|
| 2010 | Premio India Catalina | | | |
| 2010 | Premio India Catalina | Best telenovela | La bella Ceci y el imprudente | Nominated |
| 2010 | Premio India Catalina | Best actress | Manuela González | Nominated |
| 2010 | Premio India Catalina | Best actor | Julián Román | Won |
| 2010 | Premio India Catalina | Best villain | Rita Bendeck | Nominated |
| 2010 | Premio India Catalina | Best villain | Lincoln Palomeque | Nominated |
| 2010 | Premio India Catalina | Best Story | Cesar Betancourt | Nominated |
| 2010 | Premio India Catalina | Best direction | Germán Porras; Anselmo Calvo | Won |
