= Gotas de Rap =

- Origin: Bogotá, Colombia
- Genres: Hip Hop
- Label: Contra el Muro

Gotas de Rap ("Drops of Rap") were a Colombian rap group from Bogotá. They toured Europe in 1995 and in their songs they rapped in Spanish about the social and political problems in Colombia. Along with Los Generales R&R and La Etnnia, they are considered as the pioneers of Colombian rap music.

In 1999, Gotas De Rap dismantled because of the sudden death of Melisa, the female rapper. She died in a car accident in the United States, leaving the band members and the fans devastated. Not much is known about the rap group but that some members of the group started a Clothing line called "Ayara". One of the rappers from the Band "Donpopo" moved to the Netherlands in 2002 and has started his own music career there.

Gotas de Rap is famous for their song "Reina de mi Alma" featured in the famous Colombian soap opera ¿Por qué diablos?.
