= El inútil =

Colombian telenovela

El Inútil is a Colombian telenovela by Teleset for RCN Television, starring Ruddy Rodriguez, Victor Mallarino, Julian Arango and Manuela Gonzalez in 2001.

== Synopsis ==
Mirando Zapata is a businessman and industrial footwear, a husband, and father of two beautiful daughters. He is married to Ruby.

Miranda, Mirando's older daughter, gets involved with Martin Martinez, a typical child of Daddy and Mommy, who does not have to make any efforts to get what he wants. What Martin does not know is that Ruby, the love of his life, is Miranda's stepmother.

Martin's parents have always been distant with him, leaving his upbringing in the hands of Teresa, his nanny, and her husband Rafael. It was from Rafael, who is party musician, that Martin got his love of music and dance.

Martín was born by caesarean section. The character struggles to take control of his own life, largely because the women around him have not allowed him to make his own decision.

== Cast ==
- Julián Arango as Martín Martínez Köppel
- Ruddy Rodríguez as Rubiela "Ruby" Salcedo de Zapata
- Víctor Mallarino as Mirando Zapata
- Manuela González as Miranda Zapata
- Constanza Duque as Adelaida Köppel de Martinez
- Germán Quintero as Francisco Martínez
- Antonio Sanint as Fernando Fernández
- Janeth Waldman as Rosario de Fernández
- Jorge Herrera as Gerardo Ruiz
- Gerardo De Francisco as Fernán Fernández
- Teresa Gutiérrez as Doña Lucy
- Adriana Ricardo as Mónica Julitza Paternina
- Sebastián Sánchez as Gabriel Gaviria
- Lorena McCallister as Margarita de Gaviria
- Javier Gnecco Jr as Gabo Gaviria
- Patricia Grisales as Úrsula Salcedo
- Jorge Herrera as Gerardo Ruiz
- Juan Pablo Posada as Jerry Ruiz
- Adriana Campos as Jakie Ruiz
- María José Tafur as Lucero Zapata
- Carolina Trujillo as Marinita Vda de Köppel
- Martha Isabel Bolaños as Esmeralda
- Víctor Cifuentes as Concejal
- Santiago Moure as Don Efrain
- Sandra Pérez as Liliana
- Hanna Zea as Dora
- Rosalba Goenaga as Teresa
- Antún Castro as Rafael
- Jorge Monterrosa as Alfredo
- Rosa María Ramírez as Tránsito
- Diana Galeano as Aracelly
- Genoveva Caro as Juanita Holguín
- Anderson Balsero as Roland
- Víctor Hugo Cabrera as Juan de Dios
- Jerónimo Basile as Salvatore
- David Ortiz as Martín (niño)
- Betty Sánchez as Teresa (joven)
- Facio Candia as Rafael (joven)
- Manuel José Chávez as Martín (joven)
- Elkin Díaz
- Hector Barsola asNiño deforme

== Awards ==
=== 2002 TVyNovela Awards ===
- Favorite Antagonist Victor Mallarino

=== 2002 India Catalina Awards ===
- Best antagonist actor Victor Mallarino
