= Roberto Plantier =

Mexican actor

- Born: May 26, 1977 (age 47); Mexico City, Distrito Federal, Mexico
- Occupation: Actor
- Years active: 2004–present

Roberto Plantier (born May 26, 1979, Mexico City, Distrito Federal, Mexico), is a Mexican actor of telenovelas.

== Filmography ==
Television
Year	Title	Role	Notes
2004	La vida es una canción		Lead role Season 1, Episode 110: "La chica del bikini azul" Season 1, Episode 111: "Ese"
2007	Pecados ajenos	Charlie Vallejo	Supporting role
2012	Corazón valiente	Gabriel La Madrid	Special participation
2013-14	Dama y obrero	Ángel García	84 episodes U.S. version 115 episodes International version
2014	En otra piel	Eduardo "Eddie" Santana	Supporting role
2014-15	Tierra de reyes	Horacio Luján	Supporting role
2018	Mi familia perfecta	Vicente	Supporting role
