= Carlos Camacho (actor) =

Colombian actor

Carlos Humberto Camacho
- Born: June 9, 1971 (age 54); Cali, Valle del Cauca, Colombia
- Occupation: Actor
- Years active: 1993 - Present

Carlos Humberto "Pity" Camacho (born June 9, 1971) is a Colombian actor, best known for his participation in numerous telenovelas. He has acted in many telenovelas in his native Colombia, where he started his acting career. His most recent credits include Telemundo's new version of La Viuda de Blanco, and in 2007 he acts in Pecados Ajenos, also a Telemundo produced serial.

== Telenovelas ==
Year	Telenovelas	Role
2024	Betty, la fea: la historia continúa	Pascual
2024	La influencer	Nibardo
2014	Secreto de Confesion	Santiago Sanchez Vega
2014	La Playita	Juan Andrés Rodriguez
2013	Allá te espero	Guido
2013	Crimen con vista al mar	Roberto
2010	La Pola	Francisco Jose de Caldas
2013	La Diosa Coronada	Roger
2011	Colombian Interviews	Alejandro
2010	Frontera	Héctor Jiménez
2010	El Cartel 2	Sebastian Bonera
2009–2010	Más Sabe el Diablo	Horacio Garcia
2007–2008	Pecados Ajenos	Saul Farrera
2006–2007	Decisiones	
2006–2007	La Viuda de Blanco	Dimas Pantoja
2004	Casados Con Hijos	Oscar Pacho
2001-2002	La niña de mis ojos	Gabriel Fuentes
2000-2001	Alicia en el país de las mercancías	Jhon Aris
2001	Amor a mil	Enrique Guerrero
1998-1999	El amor es más fuerte	Pablo Serrano
1997	Destino de mujer	Luis Miguel Restrepo
1996-1998	Prisioneros del amor	Ignacio Menocal / Jorge del Valle
1996	Guajira	Sergio
1994	O Todos en la Cama	Juan Manuel Rios 'El Paisa'
1993	Burlando la ley	Chucho Enrique Guerrero Hernan 'Raton'
