= El baño (2020 film) =

- Theatrical release poster
- Directed by: Harold Trompetero
- Written by: Alejandro Matallana Posada
- Starring: Marcela Carvajal; Carlos Hurtado; Aída Morales; Norma Nivia; Biassini Segura; Ana María Arango
- Cinematography: Paul Cataño
- Production company: Trompetero Producciones
- Release date: December 25, 2020
- Country: Colombia
- Language: Spanish

El baño (lit. 'The bathroom') is a 2020 Colombian comedy film directed by Harold Trompetero and written by Alejandro Matallana Posada. It stars Marcela Carvajal, Carlos Hurtado, Aída Morales, Norma Nivia, Biassini Segura and Ana María Arango. It premiered on December 25, 2020, in Colombian theaters.

== Synopsis ==
In the midst of the confinement that the pandemic has brought us, to those of us who live in family groups or in company, coexistence begins to be a time bomb where there is no space to breathe and free oneself from the pressures of life and relationships with others. THE BATHROOM then becomes the only place where there is individual freedom to vent, to dream, to cry, to keep secrets and intimacies of the life that was led in the days prior to confinement. This is EL BAÑO, a film that narrates the parallel experiences lived by several members of a series of friends who have in common that they were university classmates 15 years ago and now they have to spend 24 hours a day at home while they work and live together. with their loved ones.

== Cast ==
- Marcela Carvajal
- Carlos Hurtado
- Aída Morales
- Diego Camargo
- Franco Bolívar
- Norma Nivia
- Biassini Segura
- Ana María Arango
- Tatán Mejía
- Maleja Restrepo

== Production ==
El baño was filmed in its entirety using the cell phones of the actors and actresses during the period of confinement due to the COVID-19 pandemic in Colombia.
