= Javier Gómez (actor) =

Argentine television actor

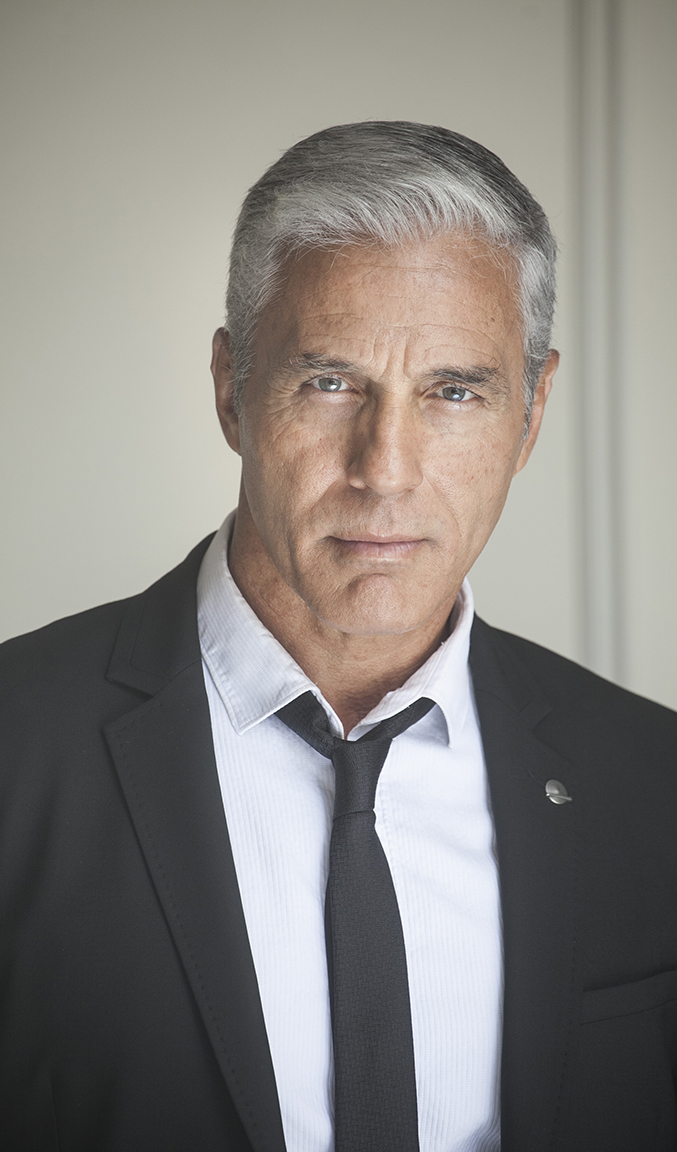
- Born: October 2, 1960 (age 65); Buenos Aires, Argentina

Javier Alejandro Gómez (born October 2, 1960) is an Argentine television actor known for participating in various television channels for telenovelas such as Telemundo, RCN Televisión, Caracol Televisión and TV Azteca. He was born in Buenos Aires.

== Filmography ==
=== Films ===
Year	Title	Role	Notes
1997	Educación sexual en breves lecciones	Unknown role	
2000	Cuando calienta el sol	Unknown role	

=== Television ===
Year	Title	Role	Notes
1993	Valentina	Willy	
1994	Prisionera de amor	Humberto	
1995	María la del Barrio	Rosales	
1995	Caminos cruzados	Mario	
1996	Te dejaré de amar	Sebastián Larios	
1996	Canción de amor	Rodrigo Pinel	
1997	Rivales por accidente	Luciano	
1998	Señora	Eduardo Covarrubias	
1998	Reina de corazones	Germán Andueza	
1999	Marido y mujer	Javier Zanetti	
2000	Golpe bajo	Rodrigo Prado	
2001	Pedro el escamoso	César Luis Freydell	
2002	Vale todo	Marco Aurélio	
2002	Todo contigo	Manuel	Television film
2003	El auténtico Rodrigo Leal	George Quintana	
2004	La mujer en el espejo	Gabriel Mutti	
2006	La diva	Abel Gómez	
2007	Sin vergüenza	Raimundo Montes	
2007	Duas Caras	Dr. Hildalgo	
2009	La bella Ceci y el imprudente	Eduardo Sáenz	
2009	Pasión morena	Lucio Sirenio	
2010	Malparida	Roberto Doval Padre	
2011	Los herederos del Monte	Emiliano López Oberto	
2012	La mujer de Judas	Marcos Rojas	
2013	Destino	Rolando Vargas Montero	
2014	En otra piel	Jorge Larrea / Julián Larrea	
2017–2018	Entreolivos	Mario Fuentes	13 episodes
2017	Venganza	Ramón Piedrahita	
2018	Luis Miguel: The Series	Jaime Camil	5 episodes
2019	El Dragón: Return of a Warrior	Carlos Duarte	

== Awards and nominations ==
Year	Award	Nominated works	Result
2014	3rd Your World Awards for First Actor	En otra piel	Nominated
