= Ezequiel Montalt =

Spanish actor and musician

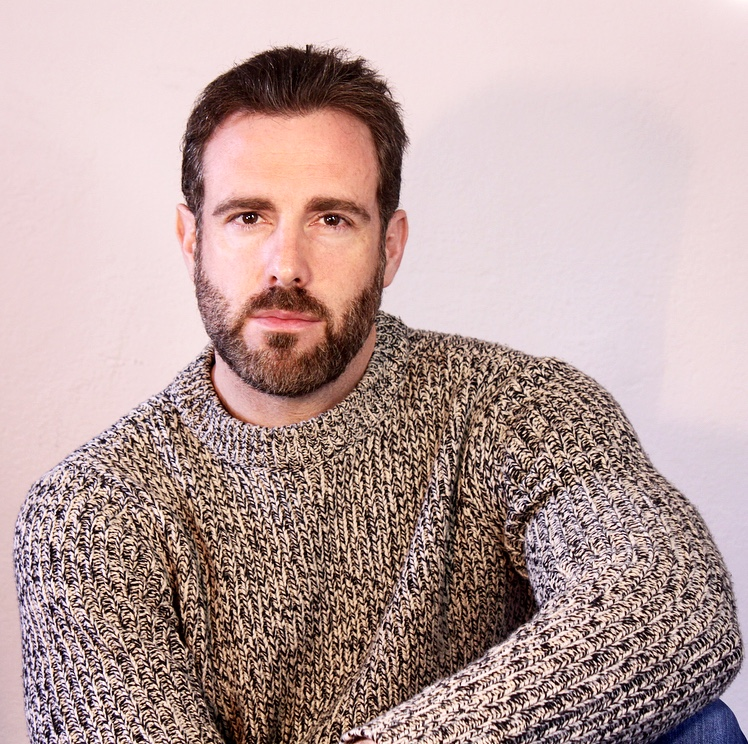
- Montalt in 2018
- Born: Ezequiel Montalt Ros; August 24, 1977 (age 48); Bonrepòs i Mirambell, Valencian Community, Spain
- Citizenship: American
- Occupations: Actor; Musician
- Years active: 2008–present
- Height: 6 ft 3 in (191 cm)
- Spouse: Katherine Rivas Rodriguez (m. 2020)
- Relatives: Vicent Montalt (brother)

Ezequiel Montalt Ros (born August 24, 1977, in Bonrepòs i Mirambell, Valencian Community, Spain) is a Spanish actor.

== Career ==
Montalt started out his career as a singer, trumpet player, composer, and arranger in a jazz band called Ejazz in his hometown. He then decided to pursue an acting career. He is best known for his role in telenovelas (soap operas). He has been in several successful productions.

Montalt studied trumpet at the Conservatory of Music in Valencia (Spain) and graduated from the Academy of ARS Studios in Valencia (Spain) as a sound engineer. He also studied singing, drums, guitar, piano and harmony. He has experience as a singer in various forms of classical and modern music. Later his career would lead him to the world of acting, participating in well-known productions.

Trained as a dramatic actor in "School Foios Municipal Theatre" (Spain), at the Academy of Performing Arts " "El Tutú de la abuela (Spain) 2001-2006, Academy of interpretation for film and television OFF Cinema (Spain) Actor Workshop with Hector Zavaleta - Neutral Academy (Miami), Theatre Workshop with Flavio Caballero – Neutral Accent (Miami)

The theatre actor starred in the 2006 play "Roberto Zucco" by Bernard-Marie Coltes in EMT Foios playing the character of the same name (Spain). In 2007 he starred in the play "Tot tot no se encuentran entre las rosas y los flors Clavells" (Spain). He then moved to the USA where he began to participate in big international telenovelas such as "Alma Indomable", where he played Mauricio Lira, "Mas Sabe el Diablo" playing Cristian Acero and "Perro Amor" as Juan Monsalve.

In 2011 he relocated to Bogota, Colombia where he participated in the telenovela Los Herederos del Monte by Telemundo, televised in many countries with great impact. Ezequiel Montalt plays Pedro del Monte, one of the main characters of the story. The telenovela features a cast of actors such as Mario Cimarro, Marlene Favela, Jose Luis Resendez, Fabian Rios, Jonathan Islas, Roberto Mateos, etc.

He has also participated in the successful Netflix TV series La Reina del Sur, an adaptation of the fourteenth novel of Spanish author Arturo Prez-Reverte. Ezequiel Montalt gives life to a drug trafficker named Jaime Arenas. This telenovela was also an international hit in all countries where it was released, including Spain, where it aired on Antena 3 as a 12-episode miniseries.

In 2013, he was featured in the supporting role of George in Telemundo's U.S.-based telenovela Santa Diabla.

He has also appeared in other important productions such as Reina De Corazones, ¿Quién es quién?, and Sangre de mi Tierra.

== Filmography ==
Television performances
Year	Title	Roles	Notes
2008	Valeria	Ángel Romero	
2008–2009	El Rostro de Analía	Gino	3 episodes
2009–2010	Más sabe el diablo	Christian Acero	
2009	Alma Indomable	Mauricio Lira	
2010	Perro Amor	Dr. Juan Monsalve	
2011	Los herederos del Monte	Pedro del Monte	
2011	La Reina del Sur	Jaime "Jimmy" Arenas	Recurring role (season 1); 4 episodes
2012	Corazón valiente	Teniente Manuel Flores	
2013	Rosario	Dr. Daniel Carvajal	
2013–2014	Santa Diabla	Jorge "George" Millan	Series regular; 85 episodes
2014	Reina de corazones	Juan Balboa "Rocky"	Series regular; 55 episodes
2015–2016	¿Quién es quién?	Armando Samaniego	Series regular; 15 episodes
2017	Sangre de mi tierra	Daniel Fajardo	2 episodes
2022	4ver (CNCO)	Rafael	
2023	Juego de mentiras	Raimundo Edwards	Recurring role
2025	Velvet: El nuevo imperio	Jim	Episode: "El perfume"
