= Lincoln Palomeque =

Colombian actor

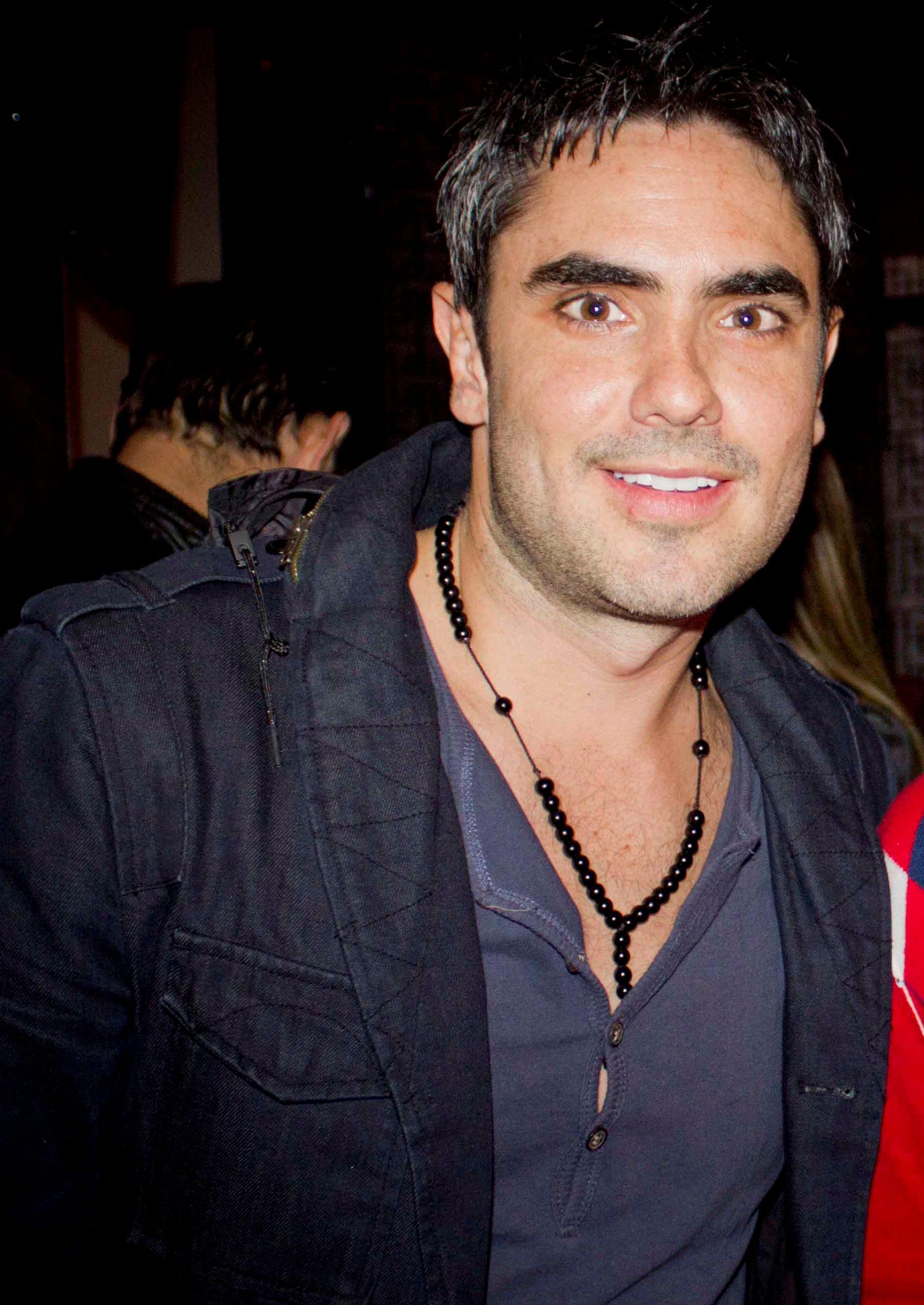
Lincoln Palomeque

Lincoln Palomeque is a Colombian actor.

== Filmography ==
=== Films ===
Year	Title	Role	Notes
2006	Karmma, el peso de tus actos	Álex	Film debut
2014	Estrella quiero ser	Roberto	
2015	El último aliento		

=== Television ===
Year	Title	Role	Notes
1999–2000	Padres e hijos	Javier	Television debut
2000–2001	Francisco el matemático	Ignacio	
2001	Isabel me la Velo	Alejandro	
2002	Siete veces Amada	Reinaldo	
2004	Me amarás bajo la lluvia	Luis Felipe Blanco	
2005	Lorena	Juan Ferrero	
2006	Hasta que la plata nos separe	Nelsón Ospina	
2008	Novia para dos	Adrián Zea / Tono Ríos	
2009	Las muñecas de la mafia	Giovanny	
2009	La bella Ceci y el imprudente	Juan Antonio Durán	
2010	La diosa coronada	Lucas	
2011–2023	La Reina del Sur	Faustino Sánchez Godoy	Supporting role (seasons 1–3)
2011	La mariposa	Richard Leguízamo	
2012	Allá te espero	Javier Linero	
2012	¿Quién eres tú?	Lorenzo Esquivel	
2013	Santa Diabla	Willy Delgado	Supporting role
2014–2016	Señora Acero	Manuel Caicedo	Main role (seasons 1–3)
2021	Café con aroma de mujer	Leonidas Salinas	Supporting role
2023	Fake Profile	David	Main Role

== Awards and nominations ==
Year	Association	Category	Nominated works	Result
2014	Miami Life Awards	Best Young Actor	Santa Diabla	Nominated
