= El laberinto de Alicia (Colombian TV series) =

- Created by: Nona Fernandez
- Written by: Tania Cárdenas y Santiago Ardila
- Directed by: Felipe Cano
- Starring: Marcela Carvajal; Patrick Delmas; Juan Pablo Shuk; Juliana Galvis; Patricia Castañeda; Consuelo Luzardo; Ricardo Vélez
- Country of origin: Colombia
- Original language: Spanish
- No. of episodes: 92

Production
- Production location: Bogotá
- Running time: 60 minutes (with commercials)

Original release
- Network: RCN Televisión
- Release: October 20, 2014 – March 9, 2015

Related
- El estilista; Sala de urgencias; El Laberinto de Alicia (Chile)

El Laberinto de Alicia (Alicia's Labyrinth) is a Colombian telenovela produced and broadcast by RCN Televisión, based on the Chilean telenovela of the same name. It stars Marcela Carvajal, Patrick Delmas and Juan Pablo Shuk, with the participations of Patricia Castañeda, Juliana Galvis, Consuelo Luzardo and Ricardo Vélez.

== Cast ==
- Marcela Carvajal as Alicia Vega
- Patrick Delmas as Manuel Pascual
- Juan Pablo Shuk as Rafael Villegas
- César Mora as Ramón Garmendia
- Patricia Castañeda as Sofía Villegas
- Juliana Galvis as Silvia Vega
- Joavany Álvarez as Efraín León
- Ricardo Vélez as Francisco Borda
- Carlos Mariño as Gregorio de La Fuente
- Consuelo Luzardo as Helena de La Fuente
- Marco Antonio López S. as Hernán Cano
- Manuel Prieto as Emilio Borda Villegas
- Cristina García as Daniela Villegas
- Guillermo Blanco as Santiago León
- Mariana Garzón as Carolina Berrío
- Isabella García as Valentina Borda Villegas
- Maríana Hernandez Doncel as Antonia Pascual Vega
- Juan Pablo Manzanera as Mateo León Vega
- Marianela Quintero as Karen Moncada
- Astrid Hernández as Ana María Franco
- Yesenia Valencia as Diana Anzola
- Kiño as Gumersindo Santos
- Jaime Santos as Álvaro de la Fuente
- Maia Landaburu as Victoria Berrío
- Carlos Betancur Chow as Guardia 2 - Cárcel Garmendia

== Versions ==
- El Laberinto de Alicia (2011), produced by TVN, starring Sigrid Alegría, Francisco Reyes and Marcelo Alonso, with the participations of Mauricio Pesutic and Amparo Noguera.
