= Me llaman Lolita =

- Genre: Telenovela; Romantic; Drama
- Created by: Juana Uribe; Juan Manuel Cáceres
- Written by: Juan Manuel Cáceres; Jorge Elkim Ospina
- Directed by: Luis Alberto Restrepo
- Starring: Carla Giraldo; Manuela González; Marcela Gallego; Zharick León; Marcelo Cezán; Germán Castelblanco; Jennifer Steffens; Santiago Moure; Julián Román; Nórida Rodríguez; Luis Eduardo Arango; Toto Vega; Juan Pablo Franco; Lucas Nieto; Sandra Reyes
- Narrated by: Manuela González
- Theme music composer: Francis Cabrel
- Opening theme: "La quiero a morir" by Dark Latin Groove
- Country of origin: Colombia
- Original language: Spanish
- No. of seasons: 1
- No. of episodes: 198; 99 (International Version)

Production
- Production locations: Mariquita, Tolima, Colombia

Original release
- Network: RCN Televisión
- Release: March 29, 1999 – August 18, 2000

Me Llaman Lolita was a Colombian telenovela between 1999 and 2000. It was written by Juan Manuel Cáceres and Jorge Elkim Ospina and directed by Luis Alberto Restrepo. This telenovela lasted 198 episodes and internationally it had 99 episodes. Starring Carla Giraldo, Manuela González and Marcelo Cezán. The antagonists were Marcela Gallego and Germán Castelblanco.

The series caused some controversy due to its depiction of the romance between Lolita, aged 12 at the start of the series, and Esteban, who is 18 years her senior, which led to the series being censored in Nicaragua and in Guatemala when it was transmitted in those countries.

== Plot ==
Since the birth of Dolores, Lolita falls in love with Esteban. But while Lolita does this, Dolores cannot be indifferent to the attributes of Esteban. The distrust of Rigoberto, the husband of Dolores, obligates Lolita and to Esteban to be separated for many years, without knowing about the immense love that she feels for him. But destiny and the eagerness of revenge pushes him again, this time to live a series of adventures and to be protected from common enemies. But his affection isn't enough, and they are obligated to be separated again, this time for six years, sufficient time so that she is a finished woman, and he understands that Lolita is the only woman in his life... but perhaps a forbidden woman for him, thereby making their love sinful.

== Cast ==
=== Main ===
- Manuela González as Lolita Rengifo Collazos
- Carla Giraldo as Teenage Lolita Rengifo Collazos
- Marcela Gallegoas Carmen Bocanegra de Rengifo
- Zharick León as Margarita "Margara"
- Marcelo Cezán as Esteban Buenahora
- Germán Castelblanco as Rigoberto Rengifo / Édgar Rengifo
- Jennifer Steffens as Eva Bocanegra
- Santiago Moure as Wallberto "Beto" Bocanegra
- Julián Román as Eulalio "Lalo" Bocanegra
- Nórida Rodríguez as Alicia Collazos
- Luis Eduardo Arango as Johnni Caicedo
- Toto Vega as Óscar "Osquitar" Collazos
- Juan Pablo Franco as Iván Banderas
- Lucas Nieto as Diego Mondragón
- Sandra Reyes as Constanza Victoria "Connie"

=== Co-Starting ===
- Valentina Rendón as Sol Ángela Posada Jaramillo
- Víctor Hugo Cabrera as Pacho Minguez
- John Jairo Jaimes as Teenage Diego Mondragón
- Diego Vásquez as Humberto Antonio Corredor Santofimio
- Jhon Bolívar as Henry Blandón
- Miguel Ángel Báes as José María "Pepito" Mahecha
- Víctor Hugo Trespalacios as Jairo "Rulos" Patiño
- Diana Galeano as Lucy de Blandón
- Alcira Gil as Pureza
- Jimmy Vázquez as Julián
- Eduardo Chavarro as Pedro
- Moisés Rivillas as Moisés
- Humberto Arango as Alirio " El Iluminado"
- Julio Correal as Dr. Neira
- Beto Arango as El Oso

=== Special participations ===
- María Fernanda Martínez as Dolores Collazos
- Yuri Pedraza as Magdalena Mondragón
- David Ramírez as Jair
- Gustavo Angarita Jr. as William
- María Irene Toro as Clemencia
- Paulo Sánchez Neira
- Rey Vásquez

== Awards ==
16th India Catalina Awards, presented by the Cartagena Film Festival (2000)

- Best Principal Actor (Marcelo Cézan)

9th Colombian TVyNovelas Awards (2001)

- Best Telenovela of the Year
- Best Supporting Actress (Marcela Gallego)
- Best Female Newcomer (Carla Giraldo)
