= Isabella Santodomingo =

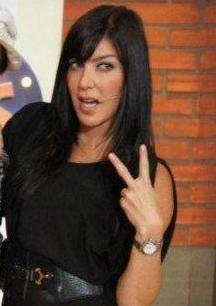
Image of Isabella Santodomingo

Isabella Santo Domingo (or Myriam Isabel Santodomingo, born March 28, 1968, in Barranquilla) is a Colombian actress, writer and daughter of Luis Alberto Santo Domingo Molina and Miryam Martínez and mother of Daniella Ossa.

== Career ==
She has worked as an actress, presenter, journalist, playwright, writer, she also won/was nominated for the following awards: Simón Bolívar, Premios TVyNovelas, India Catalina y Midia de España in the category of Best Actress. She also the director of the journals: Shock and Carrusel. She also created and founded Shock Music Awards (Premios Shock de la Musica). She's author of three best-sellers: Los Caballeros Las Prefieren Brutas, A.M. y F.M and Sexorcismo.

Currently, Isabella is writing her fourth book and she is also in the jury of a reality show called Protagonistas de Nuestra Tele by RCN TV, and is also involved in the production of the second season of the series Los Caballeros Las Prefieren Brutas, which is being produced and filmed in Colombia by Sony Entertainment Television.

Recently, she had an idea and decided to spread the initiative D.A.R (Donar, Ayudar, Recaudar) por Colombia around the social network Twitter in order to help people whose lives have been affected by the rain season in Colombia. After only one week, Isabella had gained the attention of artists like Sofia Vergara, Juanes, Shakira and of sportsmen like Edgar Renteria and Juan Pablo Angel, who donated some of their personal values in order to help Isabella raise around US$350,000 needed to help the people in need.

== Filmography ==
Year	Title	Role
2011	"Los Caballeros Las Prefieren Brutas (2da Temporada)"	Rut Castro
2011	Espejos (Pelicula)	Esther
2010	Decisiones "El Hijo del alma"	Elsa
2008	Chance	Gloria (Protagonist)
20--	El Trato	Esperanza (Protagonist)
20--	Colombianos	Sara Domínguez (Protagonist)
20--	Kalibre 35	Estrella
20--	Por Amor a Gloria	Carolina (Antagonist)
20--	La Saga	Ana Maria
20--	Me Muero Por Ti	Kika (Protagonist)
1998	Perro Amor	Camila Brando (Antagonist)
1997	Fuego Verde	Maria Victoria
1996	Eternamente Manuela	Roberta (Antagonist)
1995	Momposina	Coralina Lux (Antagonist)
1994	Tentaciones	Luzbella (Protagonist)
