= La Diosa Coronada =

TV series based on life of Angie Sanclemente Valencia

- Genre: Telenovela
- Created by: Juan Camilo Ferrand
- Screenplay by: Juan Camilo Ferrand
- Directed by: Rodolfo Hoyos; Miguel Varoni
- Creative director: Piedad Arango
- Starring: Carolina Guerra; Arap Bethke; Jonathan Islas; Carolina Gaitán; Rodolfo Valdés; Margarita Reyes; Carlos Camacho; Luces Velásquez; Alberto Palacio; Valentina Lizcano; John Mario Rivera; Angeline Moncayo; Katherine Porto; Giovanni Galindo; Pedro Falla
- Theme music composer: Miguel de Narváez
- Opening theme: "La Diosa Coronada" by Leandro Díaz
- Original language: Spanish
- No. of seasons: 1
- No. of episodes: 31

Production
- Executive producer: Hugo León Ferrer
- Producer: Madeleine Contreras
- Cinematography: Roberto Cortés; Édgar Neisa
- Editors: Diego Rene García; Mauricio González
- Camera setup: Multi-camera
- Production companies: RTI Producciones; Telemundo Studios

Original release
- Network: Telemundo
- Release: July 26 – September 7, 2010

Related
- ¿Dónde está Elisa?; Alguien te mira

La Diosa Coronada (The Crowned Goddess) is a Spanish-language telenovela produced by the United States–based television network Telemundo and RTI Colombia.

Telemundo is airing the serial from Monday to Friday about 10 weeks. As with most of its other soap operas, the network broadcasts English subtitles as closed captions on CC3. It will air 10:30 p.m. on Telemundo, sharing 1 hour slot with Donde Esta Elisa. It will occupy the whole slot after Elisa ended. From August 28, 2012, the series aired on Zone Romantica in Central & Eastern Europe.

== Background ==
The story is based on Angie Sanclemente Valencia's involvement in the transportation of cocaine from Argentina to Europe.

== Cast ==
=== Main ===
- Carolina Guerra as Raquel Santamaria Cruz
- Arap Bethke as Genaro Castilblanco
- Jonathan Islas as Kevin Avarado
- Carolina Gaitán as Valeria
- Rodolfo Valdés as Darío
- Margarita Reyes as Katya
- Carlos Camacho as Roger
- Luces Velásquez as Doña Matilde Cruz
- Alberto Palacio as Don Neron
- Valentina Lizcano as Adelaida Páez
- John Mario Rivera as Guzmán
- Angeline Moncayo as Zulma
- Katherine Porto as Norida Beltrán
- Giovanni Galindo as Ernesto / Siniestro
- Pedro Falla as Capitán Castro

=== Recurring ===
- Lincoln Palomeque as Lucas
- Diego Narváez Rincón as Kathya's client
- Adriana López as Priscila
- Mafe Barreto as Sofía
