= Jencarlos Canela =

American actor (born 1988)

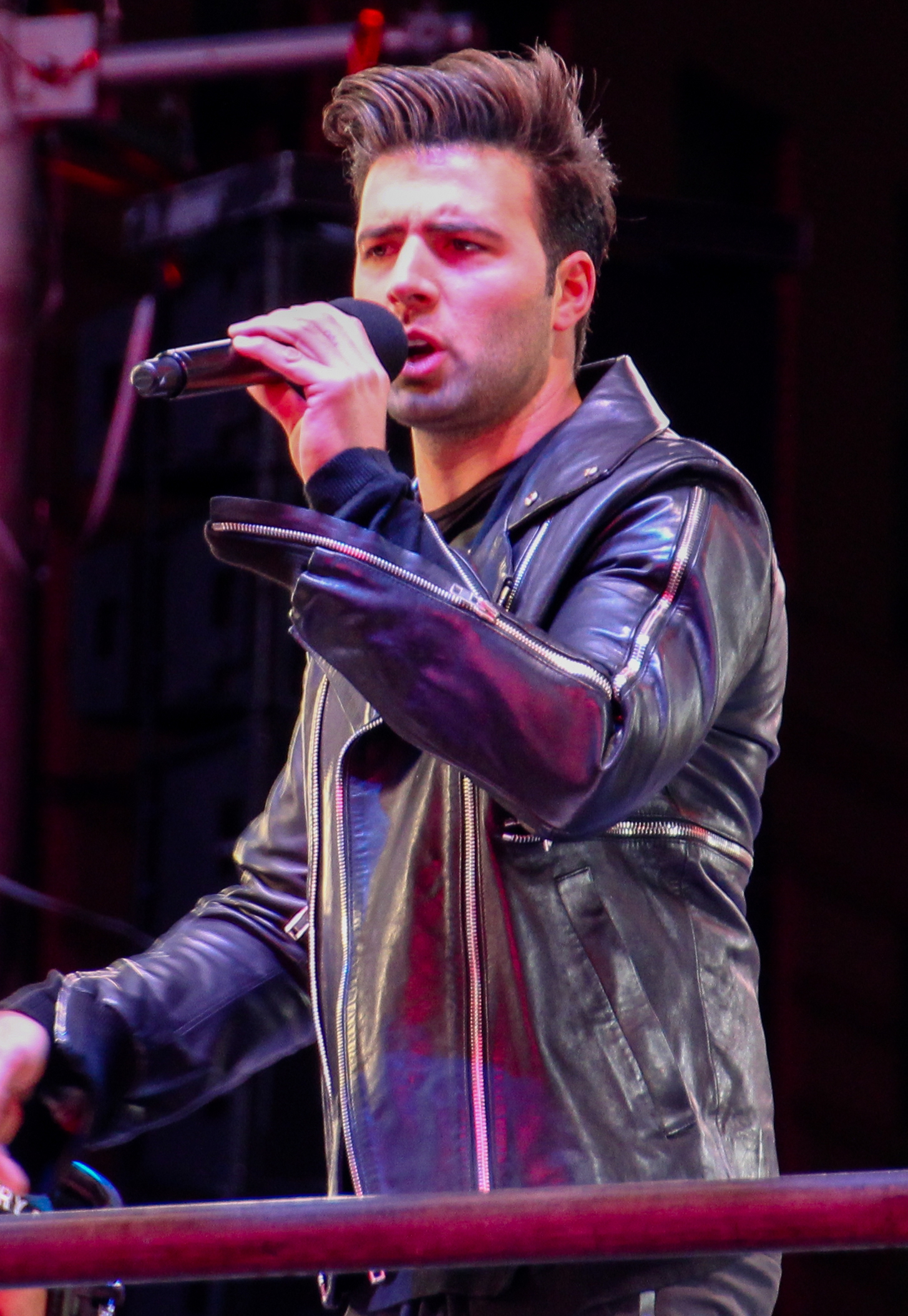
- Canela in 2014
- Born: April 21, 1988 (age 38); Miami, Florida, U.S.
- Occupations: Actor; singer
- Years active: 2000–present
- Children: 1
- Musical career
- Genres: Pop; balada; dance-pop
- Instrument: Vocals
- Label: Universal Music Latin
- Website: www.jencarloscanela.com

Jencarlos Canela (born April 21, 1988) is an American actor and singer. Canela starred in the telenovela Mi corazón insiste en Lola Volcán, and two other telenovelas.

In September 2013, he began a new project called "Scan Me" on his official Vevo account with a series of YouTube videos showing behind the scenes clips as he and his collaborators created his new album.

Canela won Artist of the Year in the 2013 awards show Premios Juventud, and his song "I Love It" won the Song of the Summer award. In the 2014 Lo Nuestro Awards show, Canela's "I Love It" music video was nominated for Video of the Year.

== Early life ==
Canela was born in Miami, Florida, to Cuban parents, Lisette and Heriberto Canela. He is the older brother of actor Jason Canela, and they also have two older siblings, Erick and Annette. Canela refused to follow his father's military footsteps and joined Disney Channel to pursue his dream of being the first Cuban Disney Singer.

== Music career ==
At the age of 12, Canela began his musical career as the lead singer of the group "Boom Boom Pop". After two years of successful participation with the group, he decided to start his solo career in late 2002. Over the following five years, he appeared in several international events including the "Miss World" 2004 and 2005 beauty pageants, "The Latin Fiesta Festival" in Toronto, Canada, and "The CALLE OCHO Festival" in Miami. During this period, he continued his studies of music and acting at the New World School of the Arts (USA), from which he graduated with honors in May 2006.

Ford Motor Company chose Canela as model and singer for its "Ride it Like a Ford" ad campaign where he sang a jingle he'd written. This commercial was broadcast on television in the United States in 2006.

Canela's first two albums were produced by Rudy Pérez at his studio in Miami Beach under the independent label Bullseye Music Entertainment. His first album "Búscame" debuted at #2 in 2009, and in 2011 his second album "Un Nuevo Día" came in at #1 during the first week it was released.

In 2012, Canela, in collaboration with Emilio Estefan, recorded the song "Sueña" for Telemundo's coverage of the 2012 Summer Olympics. It was also to be the official song of Miss America 2013, but a contract dispute with Telemundo led to the song being replaced by "Don't Stop the Party" by Pitbull. In 2012, Canela signed with Universal Music Latin Entertainment.

== Acting career ==
Canela made his acting debut in 2007 as Alfredo Torres in the hit telenovela Pecados Ajenos, in which he collaborated with Dominican singer Cristal Marie to create the theme song for the show. He then went on to appear in Doña Barbara in 2008.

In 2008, he debuted as a theater actor in the critically acclaimed stage musical Miami Libre at the Arsht center. Miami Libre narrates the dreams of a young Cuban who arrives in Miami with the intentions of being a singer, but for that to happen he will have to conquer a series of obstacles that make this work a true example of perseverance. In Miami Libre, Canela acted, performed songs and danced. The play was performed in both English and Spanish.

On January 16, 2009, Canela signed an exclusivity contract with Telemundo. In 2009, Canela was the protagonist as Ángel Salvador in the telenovela Más sabe el diablo. Gaby Espino and Miguel Varoni also starred in the telenovela. In 2010, the movie Más Sabe el Diablo: El Primer Golpe was released, again with Canela, Gaby Espino, and Miguel Varoni.

In 2011, Canela began recording the telenovela Mi corazón insiste en Lola Volcán with Carmen Villalobos. In the Telemundo award show Premios Tu Mundo 2012, the telenovela won the award for Novela of the Year and Canela won the Favorite Lead Actor award.

Canela reappeared in 2013 in the new Telemundo telenovela Pasión prohibida with Mónica Spear. In that same year, the actor won as Favorite Lead Actor for the second time at Telemundo's award show Premios Tu Mundo 2013.

On December 7, 2015, Canela made his debut on English-language television starring in Eva Longoria's NBC show Telenovela. In March 2016, Canela portrayed Jesus Christ in the musical special The Passion on Fox. In 2020, he played Uncle Victor in the Netflix series The Expanding Universe of Ashley Garcia. In 2022 he starred alongside Kevin Hart in a Netflix original film The Man from Toronto.

== Personal life ==
In September 2011, Canela and Gaby Espino (Venezuelan actress and model) did a live chat over the social networking site Twitter, where they confirmed they were in a relationship. They announced that they were expecting their first child together and the godparents would be Cristina Saralegui and Pitbull. Espino gave birth to their son in 2012. On August 26, 2014, both Canela and Espino confirmed on their official Facebook pages that they ended their relationship.

== Filmography ==
=== Film ===
Title	Year	Role	Notes
Más sabe el diablo: El primer golpe	2009	Ángel Salvador / El Diablo	Direct-to-DVD; prequel to novela
Hunted by Night	2010	Brandon	Direct-to-DVD
The Man from Toronto	2022	Agent Santoro	

=== Television roles ===
Title	Year	Role	Notes
Pecados ajenos	2007–2008	Alfredo "Freddy" Torres	Recurring role; 157 episodes
Doña Bárbara	2008-2009	Asdrúbal	Episode: "Lastimar el amor"
Más sabe el diablo	2009–2010	Ángel Salvador / El Diablo / Salvador Domínguez	Main role
Perro amor	2010	Himself	Episode: "Ruegos ahogados"
Mi corazón insiste en Lola Volcán	2011	Andrés Suárez / Andrés Santacruz	Main role; 133 episodes
Pasión prohibida	2013	Bruno Hurtado	Main role; 107 episodes
Telenovela	2015–2016	Xavier Castillo	Main role; 11 episodes
The Passion	2016	Jesus Christ	Television film
Grand Hotel	2019	El Rey	Recurring role; 4 episodes
The Expanding Universe of Ashley Garcia	2020	Victor Garcia	Main role; 14 episodes

== Discography ==
=== Studio albums ===
List of albums, with selected details
Title	Album details	Peak chart positions				Certifications
Title	Album details	Latin Pop Albums	Top Independent Albums	Top Latin Albums	The Billboard 200	Certifications
Búscame	Released: November 10, 2009; Label: Bullseye Music; Format: CD, digital download	1	7	2	91	Certification: Gold
Un Nuevo Día	Released: June 21, 2011; Label: Bullseye Music; Format: CD, digital download	1	15	1	84	—N/a
Jen	Released: May 6, 2014; Label: Universal Music Latin; Format: CD, digital download	4	—	4	—	—N/a

=== Singles ===
List of singles, with selected chart positions, showing year released and album name
Title	Year	Peak chart positions			Album
Title	Year	Hot Latin Songs	Latin Pop Airplay	Tropical/Salsa	Album
"Nadie como yo"	2009	—	—	—	Búscame
"Búscame"	2009	28	10	30	Búscame
"Amor quédate"	2009	—	—	—	Búscame
"Porque aún te amo"	2009	—	—	—	Búscame
"Sálvame"	2009	—	—	—	Búscame
"Tu veneno"	2009	—	—	—	Búscame
"No te voy a perder"	2009	—	—	—	Búscame
"Más fuerte que yo"	2009	—	—	—	Búscame
"Estés donde estés"	2009	—	—	—	Búscame
"Quiero despertar"	2009	—	—	—	Búscame
"Una lágrima no basta"	2009	—	—	—	Búscame
"Es tan triste"	2009	—	—	—	Búscame
"Un nuevo día"	2011	—	—	—	Un Nuevo Día
"Mi corazón insiste"	2011	—	22	—	Un Nuevo Día
"Una señal de amor"	2011	—	—	—	Un Nuevo Día
"Donde estará mi gran amor"	2011	—	—	—	Un Nuevo Día
"Dos amigos"	2011	—	—	—	Un Nuevo Día
"Nos perdimos otra vez"	2011	—	—	—	Un Nuevo Día
"Solo quiero tu amor (All I Need Is Your Love)"	2011	—	—	—	Un Nuevo Día
"Baila Baila" (featuring Pitbull and El Cata)	2011	—	—	6	Un Nuevo Día
"Llévame al cielo"	2011	—	—	—	Un Nuevo Día
"Si supieras cuanto te amé"	2011	—	—	—	Un Nuevo Día
"Aleluya"	2011	—	—	—	Un Nuevo Día
"Dime"	2013	—	—	—	Non-album single
"Enjoy"	2014	—	—	—	Jen
"Irreparable"	2014	—	—	—	Jen
"Tu sombra (with (J Balvin)"	2014	—	—	37	Jen
"Si la ves"	2014	—	—	—	Jen
"I Love It"	2014	—	—	—	Jen
"Bailar contigo"	2014	—	—	—	Jen
"Give It Up Tonight" (featuring Psy and KC and the Sunshine Band)	2014	—	—	—	Jen
"Volveré"	2014	—	—	—	Jen
"Junto a ti"	2014	—	—	—	Jen
"Una noche"	2014	—	—	—	Jen
"Bandera blanca"	2014	—	—	—	Jen
"LLegas tú"	2014	—	—	—	Jen
"Bajito"	2015	—	—	—	Non-album singles
"Eres"	2016	—	—	—	Non-album singles
"Baby"	2016	—	—	—	Non-album singles
"Pa Que Me Invitan" (featuring Charly Black)	2016	—	—	—	Non-album singles
"Cosita Linda" (with Pitbull)	2021	—	—	—	Non-album singles

== Awards and nominations ==
Year	Association	Category	Nominated works	Result
2010	Premios Billboard de la Música Latina	Latin Artist of the Year, New	Himself	Nominated
2011	Premio Lo Nuestro	Breakout Artist of the Year	Himself	Won
2012	Premios Tu Mundo	The Favorite of the Night	Himself	Won
2012	Premios Tu Mundo	Best Novela Soundtrack	Mi corazón insiste	Won
2012	Premios Tu Mundo	Favorite Lead Actor	Mi corazón insiste en Lola Volcán	Won
2012	Premios Tu Mundo	The Perfect Couple (with Carmen Villalobos)	Mi corazón insiste en Lola Volcán	Nominated
2012	Premios Tu Mundo	The Best Kiss (with Carmen Villalobos)	Mi corazón insiste en Lola Volcán	Nominated
2013	Premios Juventud	Song of Summer	"I Love It"	Won
2013	Premios Tu Mundo	Favorite Lead Actor	Pasión prohibida	Won
2014	Premio Lo Nuestro	Video of the Year	"I Love I"	Nominated
2014	Miami Life Awards	Best Male Protagonist	Pasión prohibida	Nominated
2014	Premios Juventud	Song corta-venas	"Irreparable"	Nominated
