= Manuela González =

Colombian actress and model

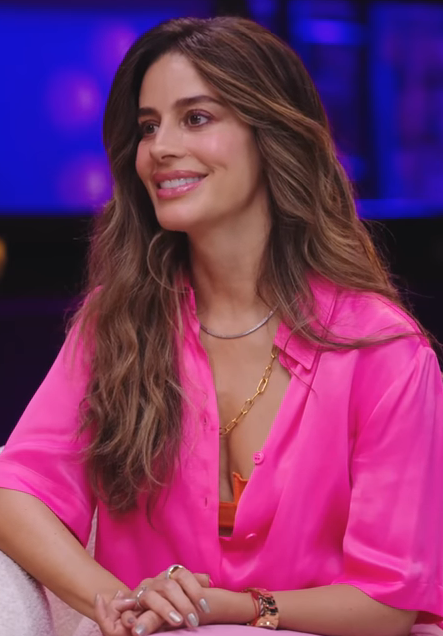
- González in 2026
- Born: January 14, 1977 (age 49); Bogotá, Colombia
- Occupations: Actress, model

Manuela González (born January 14, 1977) is a Colombian actress and model. She is best known for her roles in telenovelas such as Me llaman Lolita, El Inútil, Ángel de la guarda, mi dulce compañía, La Saga, negocio de familia, and En los tacones de Eva. In 2009 she starred in the telenovela La bella Ceci y el imprudente, in which she shared credits with Julián Román. In 2013 she joined the TV series El Señor de los Cielos, which lasted for two seasons.

== Filmography ==
| Year | Title | Character | Notes |
|---|---|---|---|
| 1997 | La mujer en el espejo | | Minor role |
| 1999 | Verano eterno | Margarita | Supporting role |
| 1999 | Me llaman Lolita | Lolita Rengifo (Young) | Young protagonist |
| 2000 | La Baby Sister | Veronica Davíla | Supporting role |
| 2001 | Solterita y a la orden | Valeria Daza | Supporting role |
| 2001 | El Inútil | Miranda Lucia Zapata | Protagonist |
| 2003 | Ángel de la guarda, mi dulce compañía | Carolina Falla | Protagonist |
| 2004 | La saga: Negocio de familia | Estella Manrique | Protagonist |
| 2006 | En los tacones de Eva | Lucia | Supporting role |
| 2008 | Novia para dos | Margarita Vega | Supporting role |
| 2009-10 | La bella Ceci y el imprudente | Cecilia Ortíz | Protagonist |
| 2011 | Popland | Katherina McLean | Antagonist |
| 2012 | Susana y Elvira | Susana | Protagonist |
| 2013 | Mentiras perfectas | Catalina Uribe | Supporting role |
| 2013-14 | El Señor de los Cielos | Lorelay 'Lay' Cadena | Supporting role |
| 2014 | El Chivo | Susana | Co-protagonist |
| 2023-2025 | Fake Profile | Ángela Ferrer | Netflix |
