= Más sabe el diablo =

Television series

- Also known as: El Diablo no es como lo Pintan
- Created by: Jimena Romero; Lina Uribe
- Developed by: Telemundo Studios Miami
- Directed by: David Posada; Danny Gavidia; Leonardo Galavis
- Starring: Gaby Espino; Jencarlos Canela; Miguel Varoni; Karla Monroig; Jorge Luis Pila; Carlos Camacho; Ezequiel Montalt; Roberto Mateos; Angeline Moncayo
- Theme music composer: Juan Carlos Rodriguez
- Opening theme: Más Sabe el Diablo de Amor; Más Sabe el Diablo de Amor (Remix); Amor Quédate song by Jencarlos Canela
- Country of origin: United States
- Original language: Spanish
- No. of episodes: 182

Production
- Executive producer: Aurelio Valcárcel Carroll
- Producer: Martha Godoy
- Production locations: New York City; Miami, Florida; Federal District
- Editor: Hader Antivar Duque
- Camera setup: Multi-camera
- Running time: 42–54 minutes

Original release
- Network: Telemundo
- Release: 25 May 2009 – 12 February 2010

Related
- Doña Bárbara; El Clon

Más Sabe el Diablo (Literally "The Devil Knows More", "Falling Angel" in English-speaking markets) is a successful Spanish-language telenovela produced by the United States–based television network Telemundo. This melodrama features lovers embroiled in intrigue, betrayal, vengeance and unbridled passion. It stars Gaby Espino, Jencarlos Canela and Miguel Varoni. Telemundo says that about 1 million people tuned in each weeknight.

== Production ==
Set in New York (yet mostly filmed in Miami), the serial features the street-wise Ángel, who treats life as a game he plays to win. He tangles with the power-hungry Martín, who is engaged to a stunning, feisty lawyer named Manuela. She decides to defend Ángel, even though Martín wants to destroy him. Neither of the men know that Ángel is Martín's own son. Our hero learns that love is the only key to survival.

Telemundo originally aired the serial Mondays through Fridays from 25 May 2009 premiere to 12 February 2010 finale. As with most of its other soap operas, the network broadcast the English subtitles as closed captions on CC3. The original working title for the show was ¿Por qué diablos? (literally "Why Devils?", although it can also mean Why the hell?), which is the name of an earlier 1999 Colombian telenovela on which it was based. A compressed version entitled "Más Sabe el Diablo the Remix" was to air with English language subtitles on the cable network mun2.

Telemundo added a subplot at the request of the U.S. Government. Perla Beltrán, a character who got a job for the U.S. Census, is used to promote the census to Hispanic Americans, who were (as of 2009) wary of the U.S. Census. The U.S. Census Bureau met with the producers of the series. Don Browne, the president of the television network, said that it maintained "total creative independence" during the process.

== Title ==
The title of the show is a shortened form of a classic Spanish idiom or refrán:

"Más sabe el diablo por viejo que por diablo."

The approximate equivalent translation in English would be:

"The devil knows more because he is old than because he is the devil."

This refrain is meant to underscore the significance of wisdom derived from age and life experience.

== Plot ==
The show starts by telling the story of Esperanza Salvador, working as the maid in the Acero household in Mexico. A young Martín has a secret sexual encounter with Esperanza, whom he ends up impregnating. The Acero family and especially Graciela, Martín's mother, disapprove. Graciela takes Esperanza to an abortion clinic. Esperanza escapes the abortion clinic with the help of the driver and goes to the home of a friend of Graciela's. Esperanza is granted a visa and lives in Miami; she does this in order to get closer to Martín. Determined to fight for Martín's love, Esperanza steals money, her passport, and visa from a vault and escapes to New York City to search for Martín Acero. But Esperanza's life starts turning upside down. A group of men surround her and take her purse with her money, passport, and visa. Left with nothing, Esperanza finds herself lost in translation and ends up in a bus station while going into labor. With the help of Sandro, a bystander, Esperanza delivers Ángel Salvador and from there Esperanza would raise Ángel in New York.

Years later, the streets become a second home for Ángel, where everyone knows him as the Devil (El Diablo). Thanks to his trade as a thief and despite his good heart, he is involved with a gang of expert thieves in large criminal acts; in the end he pays with a jail sentence. Thanks to the jail sentence, he meets Manuela Dávila, an attractive lawyer, who represents him. She pleads with the judge to let him go free and give him an opportunity to rectify his path, without suspecting that he will end up splitting her life in two.

Soon after being released, Ángel is determined to start his life over, free of crimes. But that all changes when he returns to the Cave (La Cueva), a neighborhood bar. Ángel discovers that his mother is indebted to León, the leader of the gang he has always worked for. León paid for Ángel's mother's medical expenses while he was in jail, and the only way to repay the debt is for Ángel to be involved in a robbery at a charity event. Ángel and the rest of the gang have to steal jewelry and merchandise from the show room. Unable to refuse León's requirements, Ángel's only option is to organize the robbery with a detailed and sophisticated plan that is characteristic of his personality. However, fate plays a trick of love and that night changes his life forever.

The robbery brings Manuela and Ángel closer while giving Jimmy the strength to find whoever is responsible for his father's murder, on his last day as an officer. Gregorio, the shooter, is later killed by El Cachorro in an attempt to keep him from talking to the police about the organization.

Ángel continues with the series of robberies while being Manuela's messenger and getting closer to her. Ángel eventually wins her heart and she calls off her marriage to Martín. In Ángel's desperation to finish paying his debt to León as soon as possible, Ángel demands that León pay him more to complete a job that he and "El Topo" arranged. The job is to steal computer chips from a shipment in a van. Coincidentally, Manuela arranges a weekend getaway at the Hamptons in her family's summer home. At the same time, Jimmy accepts Virginia's offer to get away from work and spend the weekend with her in the Hampton's, too. In the Hamptons, Ángel spends time with Manuela, even drawing a sketch of her until Jimmy and Virginia walk in on them, to Jimmy's disgust. Jimmy demands that Ángel leave, because he remembers questioning him in the first robbery where his father was killed. A storm keeps them indoors and Jimmy and Ángel begin to get along.

Ángel leaves early because of his ailing mother, but he lies about it in order to participate in the computer chip robbery. A surveillance camera catches El Caucho's neck tattoo while he is moving the loot from the van to their vehicle. This puts him in trouble and eventually El Caucho turns himself in. In exchange for money, when he gets released he tells the police that El Diablo is the leader of the gang. Police later invade Ángel's home where they find evidence that connects him to the previous robberies. Meanwhile, Ángel's mother has been taken hostage by Martín who finds out from his mother and León that the famous Diablo is indeed his own son. Martín doesn't care and instead arranges for Ángel to commit a robbery at the Hamptons in exchange for his mother's release.

Ángel commits the crime for El Hierro (Martín) but the corrupt police are on his tail as he leaves the house. Ángel notices the cops and rides off on a motorcycle leaving behind the papers El Hierro wanted. Romero and Uribe radio in that Ángel has left and that causes Jimmy and Mike to also chase after Ángel. At a dead end on an abandoned bridge, Ángel surrenders and tries to explain himself but Jimmy tells him to save it. The corrupt cops arrive and fire at Ángel on El Hierro's orders, knocking Ángel off the bridge and into the water and he is presumed dead.

Ángel survived and comes back to get revenge on his father, El Hierro. He hides in the home of a friend, Lucas, whom he met with Manuela at an art museum. Meanwhile, Manuela feels betrayed and lied to, so she marries Martín and tries to forget Ángel, without knowing he is Ángel's father and a criminal. Later she finds out that she is pregnant by Ángel. At first, she plans on aborting the child, but then decides to bring it to term.

Ángel looks for Manuela and reveals to her that he is Martín's son and that he set him up to make him look bad in her eyes. Doubting what Ángel tells her, she takes some of Martín's hair off his comb and swabs his mouth while he is asleep to do a DNA test. After she gets the test that proves that Ángel is Martín's son, she decides to hear the whole story ... and believes him. She tells her best friend Horacio who also believes Ángel. Meanwhile, Martín is trying to get rid of Jimmy, Manuela's brother-in-law, who is getting in the way of his macabre plans, and sets him up to put him in jail. At this time Jimmy's fiancée, Virginia Dávila, is distraught as she marries Jimmy and only a few hours into their wedding, he gets arrested. Manuela decides to tell Virginia her suspicion about Martín being behind all this and Virginia doesn't doubt it one second; she has never trusted Martín.

Martín secretly asked Carmelo to put a GPS radar into Marina's cellphone. One day, Marina and her bodyguard went to La Cueva and she was secretly kissing Cachorro when León found them kissing, so he told Cachorro that Marina was a man at a younger age. Cachorro didn't care about it, when he started to work with El Principe, since Cachorro didn't have money to pay the drugs he bought, León paid El Principe. One day, Christian had found some papers that tell the whole story of Marina. Then, he went to Marina's apartment and asked her bodyguard to bring something he forgot in the car. While he was looking for the papers Christian "needed" Christian told Marina to break something on his head to make it look like Marina just went by. When the bodyguard came back Marina was with Cachorro already. Hours later, Martín knew every single thing about Marina, while at a far train station, Martín found Marina and Cachorro, then he shot both of them.

While Jimmy was in jail, he was almost killed by some drug dealers. He was going to be transferred to another jail, when Ángel and Topo were the drivers of the transfer truck, as part of a plan to help him escape. When the real transferrers told the police that the other drivers were impostors, Ángel, Jimmy, and Topo were chased by some police, but later they were safe in Ángel's apartment.

Over time, Manuela and Ángel made up, and they became a couple again.

Christian Acero, Martín's brother, now tired of covering up for his brother, goes to Horacio and finally confesses to most of Martín's crimes. Horacio asks him to confess in a trial so his brother can be indicted. He also offers to be there for him, as he knows Christian will have to go to jail, too; but Christian decides to leave the country. Martín finds out about this, because their mother, Graciela Acero, alerts him. Martín and Carmelo, his right-hand man, look for Christian and find him in a hotel right outside New York. Carmelo sees Christian giving a messenger an envelope and pays this guy to obtain it. He hands it over to Martín who discovers it is a confession made for Horacio that can be used in a trial. Carmelo murders Christian but makes it look like a suicide; he takes Christian's laptop. What Martín doesn't know is that Christian left a virtual copy of this confession and that Carmelo has conspired with León Beltrán to betray him. When Topo was coming down the street, he heard everything that Carmelo and León were saying. Later, he and Ángel sneaked in León's office and successfully got the laptop.

When a paparazzi reporter told the assistant DA that Salvador Dominguez was Ángel, he went to Ángel's apartment to arrest everybody, but Topo came just in time with Christian's confession, and the assistant DA believed everything they said. When Ángel didn't attend a dinner in Martín's apartment, he sent artwork with a little camera in it. Then, Martín and El Príncipe had a meeting in Martín's apartment. The next day, El Príncipe had another meeting with El Hierro. Neither one knew that El Príncipe's lover was a DEA agent undercover. Before Martín went to the meeting, he watched the news and saw that Salvador was Ángel, then he broke the artwork and saw the camera. He knew he was found out, so he called his mother and told her that they had to leave the country. When Martín did not show up at the meeting with El Príncipe, the police and DEA arrested El Príncipe and his associates. At La Cueva, León was with Carmelo when Mike and Sylvana came in. Carmelo shot Sylvana, but she was wearing a bullet-proof vest and was safe. Mike killed Carmelo and arrested León.

When Martín went to his mother's house, he saw that she had committed suicide, then, when he was going out the door, he saw the spirits of Marina, Cachorro, Christian, Graciela, and Mauricio.

Then, Martín went by himself to the airport to board a private plane, when Ángel remembered that someone at a party had given him a card that has a number to rent private planes. After Ángel left, Jimmy followed him, and he had a gun, just in case. Then Ángel called the Executive Solutions and gave him the address. When Martín got to the airport, the stewardess told him that they only need the pilot to come. Later, a car came, and Martín thought that the person coming out the car was the pilot, but it was Ángel. When they started talking, Martín pointed his gun at Ángel's head when Jimmy came and Martín shot Jimmy on the arm, and Ángel punched him in the stomach so that he dropped the gun. But Martín kicked Ángel, then Ángel fell down and Martín got in the car and almost hit Ángel. While chasing Martín, Ángel shot out one of the tires, and Martín hit an electricity pole before wrecking the car. Accidentally, the gasoline tank was leaking, Martín didn't see it, and while he tried to jump over the fence, he saw the fire coming from the pole, then the car exploded and Martín was caught on fire, and he burned to death.

Weeks later, Manuela had her baby. One year later, there was a party for Daniel's first birthday, Topo was a policeman, Jimmy was the captain, Ángel didn't go to jail, and he didn't need to be called Salvador Dominguez any more. He was called Ángel Salvador. Virginia was the owner of Dávila Enterprises. While at the party, Ángel, Manuela, Daniel, Topo, Perla, Junior, Camilo, Susy, Sandro, Jimmy, Virginia, Lucas, Ariana, Mike, Sylvana, Horacio, and Andres took a happy picture.

=== Prequel ===
After the ending of Más Sabe el Diablo, Telemundo released a Direct-to-DVD prequel El Primer Golpe (The First Heist) where we discover the origins of Diablo, his early years in the streets of New York and the great tragedy which led him to meet his lawyer Manuela Dávila, the love of his life. In a series of key events, never before revealed in the soap opera, we discover that Martín Acero is the secret mastermind who controls Diablo's destiny.

El Primer Golpe tells the story of the trip of Ángel Salvador, Diablo, to Miami with his crew of Topo and Gregorio (as gay lovers), El Ronco (as a business man), and Cachorro (as a nerd) to do an important job and steal five million dollars from the Seminole Hard Rock Hotel and Casino in Hollywood, Florida, after a failed robbery at a CompUSA. During the preparation of the robbery, Ángel falls in love with a mysterious woman named Rene Cardona, the head of the heist operations and her fake wife on the mission as Beatriz Beltrán, who hides a fatal secret: her deal with Acero to obtain the diamond necklace from one of the blackjack tournament players, Ms. Maria Ponce De León, and exchange it with a fake one. But Martín Acero fails to hold up his end of the bargain when he finally obtains the real Star of Rwanda and tells Rene he lied and that the crew won't get out free. Rene fights Martín, immobilizing him and retaining the Star of Rwanda, escaping. Inside the casino, Cachorro and El Ronco get stuck inside the vault due to the alarm, while Diablo escapes to the marina to get the boat ready for his escape. Rene meets up with Diablo on the docks in order to escape with him but Martín in order to get the necklace back shoots her from afar. Police arrive and Martín fearing he'll be caught with a gun in his possession leaves empty-handed. Rene dies in Ángel's arms after he throws the Star of Rwanda into the water with police on scene. Police later tell Diablo to freeze or they'll shoot him. He is seen mourning Rene's death on the docks. The story ends with a scene inside a room where Ángel is talking to someone about his troubles. It is revealed that person is none other than his lawyer Manuela Dávila who said that he has to be a better person and that together they'll find out who is behind Rene's death and the mastermind behind all heists. The prequel series concludes with the death of Martin in a car explosion.

== Cast ==
=== Main cast ===
Actor	Character	Known as
Gaby Espino	Manuela Dávila	Main Heroine, lawyer, in love with Angel, Martin's ex-wife. Marries Angel and has baby named Daniel with him
Jencarlos Canela	Angel Salvador "El Diablo"/ Salvador Dominguez	Main hero, son of Martin and Esperanza, in love with Manuela, father of Daniel
Miguel Varoni	Martin Acero "El Hierro"	Ángel's father, main villain, in love with Marina, Manuela's ex husband.Christian's brother. Dies in a car explosion
Karla Monroig	Virginia Dávila	Manuela's sister, Jimmy's wife. Was addicted to drugs. Pregnant with Jimmy's child at the end
Carlos Camacho	Horacio Garcia	Manuela's business partner and friend
Roberto Mateos	León Beltrán	Boss of the gang, Martin's partner, villain, father of Cachorro brother of Sandro, arrested
Jorge Luis Pila	Jimmy Cardona	Police detective, Virginia's husband, new police department chief
Cristian Carabias	Jose del Carmen Frank "El Topo"	Angel's best friend, was a gang member. Loves Perla, cares for her child.
Eva Tamargo	Ariana Dávila	Anibal's wife/widow – mother of Manuela and Virginia. Stays with Lucas
Leonardo Daniel	Anibal Dávila	Father of Manuela and Virginia, husband of Arianna murdered by Martin
Jimmy Bernal	Lucas Santos	Artist, friend of Manuela/Angel, in love with Arianna, Angel's teacher in the art
Michelle Vargas	Perla Beltrán	Gregorio's girlfriend, has baby with Gregorio, in love with Topo
Esperanza Rendón	Esperanza Salvador	Angel's mother, Susy and Sandro's friend
Angeline Moncayo	Marina Suárez /Mario	Loves Cachorro, Martin's lover, transgender prostitute, murdered by Martin
Jorge Consejo	Lorenzo Blanco	Martin's PR Counselor. Quits his job
Jose Guillermo Cortines	Osvaldo Guerra	District Attorney – Mauricio Lineros' murder trial against Jimmy Cardona, in love with Manuela
Alexa Kuve	Susana "Susy" de Beltrán	Esperanza's friend, mother of Perla, wife of Sandro
Raúl Arrieta	Mike Sánchez	Detective, Jimmy's best friend. Silvana's boyfriend
Carlos Augusto Maldonado	Pablo Simon Sosa "El Ronco"	Gang member
Juan Jiménez	Marco León Beltrán "El Cachorro"	Leon's gang member and son, in love with Marina, murdered by Martin
Carlos Ferro	Gregorio Ramirez	Perla's boyfriend, Angel's friend, murdered by Cachorro by order of Martin
Alberto Salaberri	Mauricio Lineros	Associate & friend of Virginia, murdered by Carmelo by order of Martin
Carlos Perez	Carmelo Gaitán	Martin's chauffeur, accomplice and hitman, shot and killed by Mike
Jeannette Lehr	Graciela de Acero	Martin's mother, villain, commits suicide
Roxana Peña	Nina Lazarus	Manuela's old secretary, in love with Christian
Juan David Ferrer	Sandro Beltran	Husband of Susy, León's brother, father of Perla and Camilo
Ezequiel Montalt	Christian Acero	Martin's brother,, killed by Carmelo by order of Martin
Aneudy Lara	John Blanco 'El Mocho'	Leon's gang member, goes to jail
Talina Duclaud	Silvana Santos	Policewoman, daughter of Lucas Santos, in love with Mike
Patricia Ramos	Raquel	Policewoman, Silvana's friend
Mery de los Rios	Lola	Perla's rival, dancer at Leon's bar
Cindy Luna	Jenny	Lola's friend, dancer at Leon's bar
Alex Fumero	Cirilo Marquez 'El Caucho'	Leon's gang member, accidentally killed by inmate 'El Cuchillo
Sofia Stamatiades	Esperanza Salvador	Young Esperanza, mother of Angel

=== Secondary cast ===
Actor	Character	Known as
Adolfo Aguilar		
Alejandro Acevedo		
Alexander Otaola	Pepe	Private detective, worked for Graciela and Cristian
Alvaro Ruiz	Agent Daniel Cordoba	NYPD Internal Affairs Investigator
Andrea Romero	Andrea Romero	TV Meteorologist, Telemundo 47 – New York
Andres Garcia Jr.	Diego Robledo	Publicist
Ariel Texido	Andres Molina	Manuela's and Horacio's secretary. Gay boyfriend of Horacio
Armando Acevedo		
Carlos Andres Vargas	La Nutria	Criminal
Carlos Garin	Tom	Anibal's attorney, estate planner
Carlos Giron	young Martin Acero	
Carlos Pítela		Priest
Carlos Ponce	Antonio "El Perro" Brando	Cross-character from future novel Perro Amor
Christopher Santos		
Cristina Figarola		Anibal's nurse
Dayana Garroz	"Ada" Adamaris Gracia	Infiltrate DEA's policewoman, drug lord's lover
Eduardo de Alba		
Eduardo Ibarrola	Jose Antonio Frank	Topo's drunk father, villain
Eduardo Wasveiler	Rogeles	Colleague of Virginia
Elizabeth Barón	Nelly	Martin's secretary
Elsa Pestana		
Enrique Arredondo	Jose del Pino	Governor of prison
Enrique Herrera	Pedro Velez	Senator
Ernesto Molina	Julio Cesar Romero	Corrupt detective, arrested
Esteban Villareal	Fausto	Anibal's doctor
Evelin Fores		
Felipe Garces		
Fidel Perez Michel	Falques	Colleague of Virginia
Gabriel Abdala	Zacarias	Friend of Lucas
Gerardo Riveron	Jaime Cardona	Jimmy's father, policeman, killed by Gregorio
Gloria del Valle		
Guadalupe Hernández	Ezequiel	
Hector Fuentes	Luis Martinez	
Hernando Visbal	John	
Idania Diaz		
Isaac Olivera		
Isaniel Rojas	Jota	drug dealer
Ismael Barrios	Dario Uribe	Corrupt detective, arrested
Itzel Ramos	Marlen	
Iván Hernández	Santana	Auditor, colleague of Virginia
Jason Canela		
Jesus Padron		
Jhonatan del Rio		
Joel Sajiun	Ramon	Criminal, worked for Martin
John Gertz	Alan Peterson	A.M.I. Executive, client of Manuela, murdered by Carmelo by order of Martin
Johnny Acero	Jason "El Perro" Torres	Drug dealer, killed by Romero and Uribe
Jorge Ali		Judge: Mauricio Lineros' Murder Case
Jorge Bernal	Jorge Bernal	Telemundo TV interviewer
Jorge Hernandez	Rafael 'El Viejo'	Jail-mate of Jimmy
Jorge Luis García	Detective Mejía	Detective on the Brooklyn police station
Jorge Luis Portales	Contreras	Jailer
Juan Carlos Gutiérrez	El Cuchillo	Criminal, tries to kill Jimmy
Juan Pablo Raba	Julio	
Leandro Fernández	El Trece	Criminal, killed by La Nutria
Leslie Stewart	Isabel Santini	Martin's lover
Lidya Valdes	Concepción Frank	Grandmother of Topo
Lucho Cáceres	Jay Jay	
María Celeste Arrarás	María Celeste	Telemundo TV interviewer
Mariana Da Silva	Anna	Friend of Perla
Marco Figueroa	Felix	Colleague of Cristian
Marcos Miranda		Colleague of Virginia
Marta Gonzalez	Lida	Lorenzo's assistant
Michael M. Matluck	Ralph	Gallery owner, associate of Sara
Miguel Sahid	Aldo Roca	
Nelson Steegers	Freddy	Colleague of Sandro
Nelson Tallaferro (aka Neal Kodinsky)	Jose Vega	Jimmy's right-hand detective, likes Silvana
Omar Torres		
Osvaldo Strongoli		Doctor
Paula Arciniegas		
Pamela Perez		
Rafael Robledo		Doctor
Rafael Yau	Larry	Friend of Lucas
Ramón Morell	Tono	
Rayner Garranchan	Detective Trujillo	
Roberto Huicochea	Evaristo Ortega "El Principe"	Drug lord, arrested, lover of Ada
Rodolfo Castera	El Pirata	Drug lord's right hand, arrested
Rosanna Montenegro	Roxana	Social worker
Roxana Chavez	Ana Lucia Ponte	Friend of Graciela
Rubén Darío Gomez	Rocha	
Salim Rubiales	Francisco 'Cisco'	Criminal
Silgian Castillo		
Sissi Fleitas		Gallery owner, friend of Manuela
Steven T. Robinson	Pedestrian	
Tely Ganas	Marisela Londoño	Anibal's secretary
Victoria del Rosal	Nicole	Martin's lover
Vivi Pineda	Blanca	Maid in Arianna's house
Vivianne Alvárez	Vivianne Alvárez	State Farm Insurance agent
Vladimir Escudero	Zurdo	
Xavier Coronel	Captain Hernando Soto	Jimmy and Mike's boss, attempted murder by Romero and Uribe
Yolly Dominguez	Sofia	Gallery owner, associate of Ralph, friend of Lucas
Lynda Brown		

== See also ==
- List of television shows set in Miami
- Telenovela
