= Marcela Carvajal =

Colombian actress

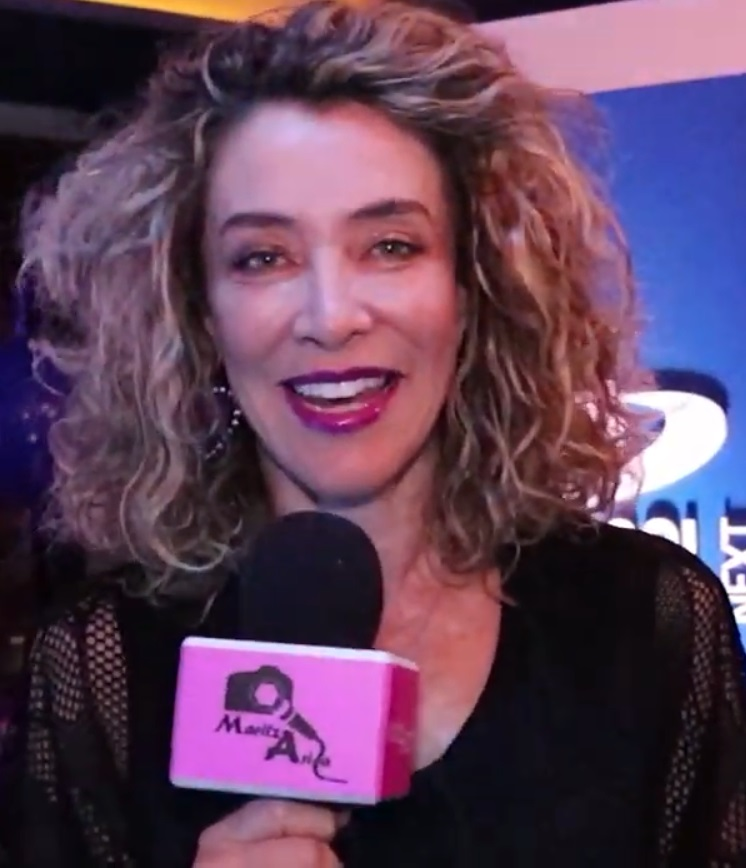
- Born: 28 June 1969 (age 56); Bogotá, Colombia
- Occupation: Actress
- Years active: 1992–present

Marcela Carvajal (born 28 June 1969) is a Colombian actress known for her roles in telenovelas. She began her acting career in theater, touring internationally with groups such as Teatro Balcón and El Grupo before making her television debut in 1992 with the telenovela Espérame al final. Carvajal starred in series such as En cuerpo ajeno and ¿Por qué diablos? Throughout her career, her performances have earned her multiple awards, including a Premios Simón Bolívar de Televisión award, as well as Best Leading Actress honors at the TVyNovelas Awards and the Premios India Catalina.

== Early life and career ==
Marcela Carvajal was born on 28 June 1969 in Bogotá, Colombia. Her career began when she joined theater groups such as Teatro Balcón and El Grupo with which she toured internationally to Norway, Finland, and the Netherlands.

== Career ==
Carvajal made her television debut in 1992 in the telenovela Espérame al final. Later that same year, she continued her acting career by appearing in En cuerpo ajeno alongside Amparo Grisales and Danilo Santos. Carvajal later revealed that she initially felt discouraged on the set of the series; she recalled Grisales expressing displeasure at having to work with an amateur actress, as well as encountering difficulties with the production's hairdressers, who struggled to style her hair. The following year, she starred in ¿Por qué diablos?.

== Awards ==
In 1993, she won the award for Best Actress at the Premios Simón Bolívar de Televisión in 1993 for her role in Maria, Maria. She also received the awards for Best Protagonist Actress at the 2007 TVyNovelas Awards and Best Lead Actress in 23 Premios India Catalina.

== Filmography ==
=== Film roles ===
| Year | Title | Roles | Notes |
|---|---|---|---|
| 2000 | Diástole y sístole: Los movimientos del corazón | Ella | |
| 2006 | Dios los junta y ellos se separan | Rosalba Guzmán de Restrepo | |
| 2007 | Buscando a Miguel | Mónica | |
| 2011 | Locos | Carolina | |
| 2016 | El lamento | Lucía | |
| 2017 | Hjertestart | Pilar | |
| 2017 | Virginia Casta | Antonia | |

=== Television roles ===
| Year | Title | Roles | Notes |
|---|---|---|---|
| 1992 | En cuerpo ajeno | | |
| 1996 | La sombra del deseo | Nina Soler | |
| 1997 | Yo amo a Paquita Gallego | Soledad Gallego | |
| 1999 | ¿Por qué diablos? | Ángela Falla | |
| 2001 | El informante en el país de las mercancías | Alejandra León | |
| 2002–2003 | La venganza | Raquel Rangel de Valerugo | |
| 2003–2004 | Pecados capitales | Fabiana Salinas | |
| 2004 | La saga, negocio de familia | | |
| 2004 | Dora, la celadora | Ximena Urdaneta | |
| 2006 | Hasta que la plata nos separe | Alejandra Maldonado | Main role; 162 episodes |
| 2008 | La Pocima | Andrea | Television film |
| 2008 | Tiempo final | Sheriff | Episode: "La entrega" |
| 2010 | Secretos de familia | Claudia San Miguel | |
| 2012–2013 | Lynch | Major Ángela Fernández de Triana | 11 episodes |
| 2012–2013 | ¿Donde carajos está Umaña? | Ángela Adriana Pizarro Nieto de Umaña / Audrey Falla de Feria | Main role; 140 episodes |
| 2014 | El laberinto de Alicia | Alicia Vega | Main role; 91 episodes |
| 2015 | Laura, una vida extraordinaria | Clarissa Montoya | Episode: "Desde pequeña Laura se sacrifica por su familia" |
| 2017–present | La Nocturna | Esther Chevallier Brandt | Main role (season 1); 105 episodes |
| 2018 | Descontrol | Zoe | Episode: "Romerito" |
| 2019 | Decisiones: Unos ganan, otros pierden | Gloria | Episode: "Los timadores" |
| 2025 | Perfil falso | Laura | Episodes: 1 à 10 temporada 2 |
