= Leandro Fernández (actor) =

Colombian-Spanish actor, musician and director

- Born: Leandro Fernández; Colombia
- Occupation: Writer/Actor/Director/Musician

Leandro Fernández is a Colombian-Spanish actor, musician and director. Son of actor and painter Domingo Fernández Adeba and brother of renowned actor Helios Fernández, and actress and musician Paola Fernández, Fernández studied on "Instituto Departamental de Bellas Artes" in Cali, Colombia, film direction in Madrid, Spain and moved to Miami, FL where he has been promoting the Hispanic theater since his arrival in 1999.

== Career ==
In 1996 he was nominated Best Actor in a Regional Comedy in Claqueta awards in the Framework of International Film Festival in Cartagena, in 1998, traveled to Spain with his own theater group, with the play "Cuentos con Tambor", there he spent a year, performing in various theaters and renowned cultural sites in Spain, working for a leading NGO at the Universidad Complutense, "Solidarios" and the Colombian Embassy.

in 2002 he created the "Grupo de Teatro La Tarumba Miami" that has performed in theaters and most public schools in Miami-Dade County, with works written and directed by him, as "Las Aventuras de Don Quijote", "Cuentos con Tambor", "Coloncontando Don Cristóbal Navegando".

He has participated in series of the most important Hispanic American television channels such as Telemundo and Univision, as "Prisionera", "Al filo de la ley", "Dame Chocolate", "El Rostro de Analía, "El Cuerpo del Deseo", "Más Sabe el Diablo", he taught at the Telemundo reality show: "Protagonistas de la fama VIP", led the Colombian comedy festival held in Miami in September 2006 "Juntos pero no revueltos" In 2007 he directed the segments of humor for Sabado Gigante with Don Francisco and the Stand Up Comedy "Las Mujeres son de Venus y los Hombres son... de Madre". Later he wrote the sequel to "Las Mujeres son de Venus y los Hombres son... de Madre", called "Segundo Round". He has also worked as actor and director on "Juliana, Amante a la Colombiana", "Las Aventuras de Don Quijote", "Colón Contando Don Cristóbal Navegando" y "Cuentos con Tambor" and also as director on "El Insomnio Americano".

He has also interpreted "Santo Pecado" (2010) by Edgar Moreno, directed "Dos Gallinas Sentadas Hablando Pura M" (2011) with Jeannette Lehr and Rosalinda Rodríguez and also "Mujeres de Par en Par" (2011) with Mónica Pasqualotto (Venezuela), Rosalinda Rodríguez (Mexico), Bianka González (Venezuela), Leticia Morales (Argentina), Nadia Rowinsky (Uruguay), Paulina Galvez (Chile), Danly Arango (Colombia) and Paola Fernández (Colombia), "Jodidos pero Contentos" (2012), with Carlos Yustis (Mexico) and Danly Arango (Colombia), "Hombres de Bar en Bar" (2012), with Gabriel Porras (Mexico), Juan David Ferrer (Cuba), Karlos Anzalota (Puerto Rico), Mauricio Renteria (Cuba), Ariel Texido (Cuba) y Laura Termini (Venezuela), "A 2.50 La Cuba Libre" (2012) with Mónica Pasqualotto (Venezuela), Rosalinda Rodríguez (Mexico), Bianka González (Venezuela), Paulina Galvez (Espana) and Danly Arango (Colombia), "Desconectados" with Bianka Gonzalez (Venezuela), Karlos Anzalotta (Puerto Rico), Cristina Ferrari (Venezuela), Flavia Scarpa (Espana), Boris Roa (Chile), Sarah Luz Cordoba (USA), Amylkar (Colombia). He has also directed for "Microteatro" (a project of "Centro Cultural Espanol de Miami") works like: "Armadas hasta los Dientes" written by Indira Paez, "Truculencias" written by Leandro Fernandez and Victor Aaron, "Mujeres Ligeras" written by Indira Paez and "Pin Pan Toda La vida" written by Enio Mejia and Pablo Bautista, "Mucha Mierda" written by Nancho Novo y "La Audicion" written by Indira Paez, which have been selected as the best on their respective seasons.

== Work ==
=== Stage ===
- 2013: Desconectados (Director)
- 2013: Las Mujeres son de Venus y los hombres son de madre (Actor & Director)
- 2013: La Audicíon (The Audition), written by Indira Páez (Director)
- 2012-2013: A 2.50 la cuba libre (Director)
- 2012: Jodidos pero Contentos (Director)
- 2012: Hombres de Bar en Bar (Director)
- 2011: Mujeres de par en par (Director)
- 2011: Dos Gallinas sentadas hablando pura m... (Director)
- 2010: Santo Pecado (Actor)
- 2001-2009: Juliana, Amante a la Colombiana (Actor & Director)
- 2002-2008: Las Aventuras de Don Quijote (Writer, Actor & Director)
- 2008 Milagros de Bergamota (Writer, Actor & Director)
- 2004: El Rey que se Enamoró de la Luna (Writer, Actor & Director)
- 2005-2008: Cuentos con Tambor (Actor & Director)
- 2003: Coloncontando Don Cristóbal Navegando (Writer, Actor & Director)
- 2007-2009: Las Mujeres son de Venus y los Hombres son... de Madre! (Writer, Actor & Director)
- 2009-2010: Las Mujeres son de Venus y los Hombres son... de Madre! - Segundo Round (Writer, Actor & Director)
- 2004-2007: El Insomnio Americano (Director)

=== Filmography ===
- Azúcar
- El Confesor
- Canas al Aire
- Pásela Chévere
- 2005: Decisiones - "¿Y de aquello... nada?"
- Los Pocillos
- Solo de Guitarra
- 2007: Prisionera
- 2006: Al filo de la ley
- 2008: Dame Chocolate
- 2009: El Rostro de Analía
- El Cuerpo del Deseo
- 2009: Más Sabe el Diablo

=== Awards and nominations ===
Awards

- 2012: Especial mention for his performance on "Santo Pecado" - II Festival de Teatro de pequeno formato (FESTPEF)
- 2012: Best text for monologue - Leandro Fernandez/Bernardo Puebla for "Santo Pecado" - II Festival de Teatro de pequeno formato (FESTPEF)
- 2008: Best Actor - Premios NG, Miami
- 2006: UN award for his artistic work
- 2002: Miami City Keys - for his performance on "Juliana Amante a la Colombiana"
- 1996: Best Comedy Actor - Premio Claqueta, Festival de Cine, Cartagena, Colombia
- 1994: Best Actor - Festival Nacional de Teatro, Cali, Colombia

Nominations

- 2009: Best Actor - Miami Life Awards for "Milagros de Bergamota"
- 2006: Best Guest Director - Premios ACE for "Juliana Amante a la Colombiana"
