= Las Brujas de South Beach =

- Brujas title card. (The Power of Three insignia is the same as that used on Charmed).
- Developed by: Valentina Parraga
- Starring: Natalia Streignard; Ana Lucía Domínguez; Jullye Giliberti; Catherine Siachoque
- Country of origin: United States
- Original language: Spanish

Production
- Executive producer: Aurelio Valcárcel Carroll
- Production location: Miami, Florida
- Running time: 45 minutes

Original release
- Network: Telemundo

Three of Florida's four witches. (Jullye Giliberti, Natalia Streignard, and Ana Lucía Domínguez)

Las Brujas De South Beach (The Witches of South Beach) is a Spanish-language telenovela produced by the United States-based television network Telemundo. It stars Natalia Streignard, Ana Lucía Domínguez, Jullye Giliberti and Catherine Siachoque as four alluring women who were sisters in a past life. This fantasy melodrama was expected to debut in 2009, but the project was cancelled.

== Cast ==
- Natalia Streignard - Lola
- Jullye Giliberti - Catalina
- Ana Lucía Domínguez - Eva
- Catherine Siachoque - Damaris
- José Ángel Llamas -
