= Giliberti =

Giliberti may refer to:

- Jullye Giliberti (born 1976), Venezuelan actress
- 6339 Giliberti, a main-belt asteroid
