= Hermosa niña =

- Genre: Telenovela
- Created by: Jimena Romero
- Story by: Bernardo Romero Pereiro
- Directed by: Mario Mitrotti
- Starring: Ana Lucía Domínguez
- Country of origin: Colombia
- Original language: Spanish
- No. of seasons: 1
- No. of episodes: 16

Production
- Executive producer: Samuel Duque Duque
- Production location: Villamaría, Caldas
- Production company: Fox Telecolombia

Original release
- Network: Canal Uno
- Release: 1998

Hermosa niña is 1998 Colombian telenovela created by Jimena Romero from a screenplay by Bernardo Romero Pereiro. The series is produced by Fox Telecolombia (formerly known as Telecolombia) for Canal Uno. It stars Ana Lucía Domínguez as the titular character, it was also the second telenovela in which the singer Fanny Lu participated.

== Plot ==
The story revolves around Antonia Donoso (Ana Lucía Domínguez), a beautiful girl from Villamaría, a small town in Caldas, Colombia. His parents have taken care of their beauty as a precious gift. She is naive and very cheerful. His life could have been better if he had not dabbled on television. At fifteen he had fallen in love with a man 10 years older than her: Tomás Caballero. Television arrived in Manizales with all its technology and looking for a candidate to represent Ana del Campo (famous singer). Antonia, secretly from her parents, signs up to participate and wins.

== Cast ==
- Ana Lucía Domínguez as Antonia Donoso Duarte
- Astrid Junquito Tita Duarte
- Mariangelica Duque as Lady María
- Juan Pablo Franco as Valentín
- Hugo Gómez as Antonia's father
- Fanny Lu as Bianca
- José Luis Paniagua as Obando Durán
- Luis Fernando Salas as Tomás Caballero
- Vanessa Simon as Carolina Cruz
- Janeth Waltman as Carolina's friend
- Jimena Romero Enriquez
