= Voltea pa' que te enamores (2014 TV series) =

- Genre: Telenovela
- Created by: Nora Sánchez-Alemán
- Based on: Voltea pa' que te enamores by Mónica Montañés
- Directed by: Carlos Santos; Otto Rodríguez
- Starring: Pedro Moreno; María Elena Dávila
- Music by: Carlos Mármol
- Opening theme: "Voltea pa' que te enamores" by Manuel Ramos
- Original language: Spanish
- No. of seasons: 1
- No. of episodes: 123

Production
- Executive producers: Cristina de la Parra; Carlos Sotomayor
- Camera setup: Multi-camera
- Production companies: Univision Studios; Venevisión International

Original release
- Network: TC Televisión (Ecuador); Venevisión (Venezuela); Univisión (United States)
- Release: November 11, 2014

Voltea pa' que te enamores (named in English as "Fallen Over Love") is a telenovela produced by Venevisión International in co-production with Univision. It is an adaptation of the Venezuelan telenovela produced between 2006 and 2007 Voltea pa' que te enamores. Filming began in June 2014.

The series starred María Elena Dávila, Pedro Moreno, Mauricio Mejía, Cristina Bernal, Frances Ondiviela and featured Lupita Ferrer in her return to telenovelas.

== Cast ==
- Pedro Moreno as Rodrigo Karam
- Marielena Dávila as Matilda Ramos
- Mauricio Mejía as Santiago
- Cristina Bernal as Gabriela "Brela" Ramos
- Frances Ondiviela as Pilar Amezcua
- Cecilia Gabriela as Aidé Karam
- Harry Geithner as Doroteo Galíndez
- Fernando Carrera as Rómulo Karam
- Emeraude Toubia as Stephanie Karam
- Roberto Mateos as Gavito
- Víctor Cámara as Juan Ramón Amezcua
- Lupita Ferrer as Doña Elena Salas
- Eduardo Serrano as Don José Salas
- William Valdés as Gerardo Ramos
- Gaby Borges as María Del Pilar Amezcua
- Natasha Domínguez as Felicia Amezcua
- Maité Embil as Georgina de la Parra
- Adrián Di Monte as Armando
- Mariet Rodriguez as Michelle
- Mijail Mulkay as Mateo
- Ariel López Padilla as Marco Aurelio
- Alfredo Huereca as Francisco
- Lorena Gómez as Arantxa de la Parra
- Catalina Mesa as Livi
- Ana Sobero as Beatriz Higuiera
- Angela Rincón as Yuli
- Marina Ruiz as Maricarmen Aguirre
- Rosalinda Rodríguez as Remedios
- Samuel Sadovnik as Alexis
- Alberto Salaberry as Alejandro Olmedo
- Daniela Botero as Licd. Julia Basáñez
- Martha Picanes as Beatriz's mother
- Eduardo Ibarrola as Hector
- Enrique Montaño as Raimundo
- Guido Massri as Prof. Samuel Ruiz “Pelón”
- Alejandro Bueno as child of Michelle & Mateo
- Pablo Bueno as child of Michelle & Mateo
