= La ley del silencio =

- Genre: Telenovela; Drama
- Starring: José Ángel Llamas; Flora Martínez; Rodrigo de la Rosa; Jullye Giliberti; Alejandro Chabán
- Country of origin: United States
- Original language: Spanish
- No. of episodes: 32

Production
- Producer: Carlos Sotomayor
- Running time: 42-45 minutes
- Production company: FremantleMedia Latin America

Original release
- Network: Telemundo
- Release: March 15 – May 6, 2005

Related
- Te voy a enseñar a querer

La ley del silencio is an American telenovela produced by FremantleMedia Latin America for Telemundo in 2005.

== Cast ==
- José Ángel Llamas - Padre Javier Castro
- Flora Martínez - Natalia Aguirre
- Rodrigo de la Rosa - Fernando Cardenas
- Jullye Giliberti - Magdalena Aguirre
- Alejandro Chabán - Tomás
- Joaquín Garrido - Pedro
- Lumi Cavazos - Clemencia
- Omar Fierro - Francisco
- Issabella Camil - Julia
- Fernanda Romero - Virginia
- Lilian Tapia - Guadalupe
- Henry Zakka - Luis Alberto
- Julio Bracho Castillo - Ángel
- Liz Gallardo - Manuela
- Chela Arias - Clotilde
- Mónica Lopera - Adela
- José Bardina - Arturo
- Eliana H. Alexander - Amparo
- Sergio Romero - Sebastián
- Cora Cardona - Mercedes
- Mara Croatto - Isabel
- Roger Cudney - Meyer
- Juan Pablo Gamboa - Leopoldo
- Marlon Lara - Jimmy
- Mauricio Ripke - Sata
- Leticia Alaniz - Laura / Recepcionista
- Joe Arquette - Topo
- Ricardo Azulay - Dr. Clark
- Glenn Bradley - Miembro de banda
- Dan Burkarth - Policia & Chofer
- Javier Castillo - Jerry García
- Édgar Castuera - Bombero
- Gerardo Dávila - Manager de restaurante
- Gigi Erneta - Jane
- Carlos Girón - Ramiro
- Rodrigo Gómez - Poncho
- Julián Guevara - Sweety
- Tony Helling - Paulina
- Andrea León - Apache
- John Nikitin - Agente Counts
- Mónica Peña - Enfermera Svenson
- J.R. Ramírez - Mr. A
- Raymond Rivera - Travolta
- Germán Santiago - Tomás
- Mark-Brian Sonna - Dr. José Luis Monsalve
- Craig Taylor - Patrón
- Carolina Vengoechea - Jennifer González
- Ted West - Basura

== Production ==
The series was announced in July 2003. Filming took place in Dallas, Texas and is Telemundo's first telenovela to be produced in high-definition.
