= Aurelio Valcárcel Carroll =

Aurelio Valcárcel Carroll is a television producer and director known for his association with the Telemundo television network. His credits include Tierra de Pasiones, La Viuda de Blanco, Prisionera and Dame Chocolate. He is sometimes billed as Aurelio Valcárcel. He recently worked on Corazón Valiente and El Rostro de la Venganza for Telemundo.

== Credits ==
Post-production director - Telemundo-RTI Producciones

- La Reina del Sur (telenovela) (2010/2011)

Executive Producer - Telemundo

- Amantes del desierto (2001)
- Luzbel esta de visita (2001/2002)
- La Venganza (2002/2003)
- Amor Descarado (2003/2004)
- Prisionera (2004)
- ¡Anita, no te rajes! (2004/2005)
- El Cuerpo del Deseo (2005/2006)
- Tierra de Pasiones (2006)
- La Viuda de Blanco (2006/2007)
- Dame Chocolate (2007)
- Pecados Ajenos (2007/2008)
- El Rostro de Analía (2008/2009)
- Más Sabe el Diablo (2009/2010)
- ¿Dónde Está Elisa? (2010)
- Perro Amor (2010)
- El Fantasma de Elena (2010/2011)
- Alguien Te Mira (2010) (2010/2011)
- Aurora (TV Series) (2010/2011)
- La Casa de al Lado (2011)
- Mi Corazón Insiste (2011)
- Una Maid en Manhattan (2011/2012)
- Relaciones Peligrosas (2012)
- Corazon Valiente (2012/2013)
- El Rostro de la Venganza (2012/2013)
- Dama y Obrero (2013 telenovela) (2013)
- Marido En Alquiler (2013/2014)
- Reina de Corazones (2014)
