= Me muero por ti =

- Genre: Telenovela; Drama
- Created by: J. F. Cascales
- Directed by: Pepe Sánchez; Juan C Wessolossky
- Opening theme: "Si tú quisieras" by Luis Fonsi
- Country of origin: United States
- Original language: Spanish
- No. of episodes: 92

Original release
- Network: Telemundo
- Release: 1999

Me muero por ti is an American telenovela produced by Rubicon Entertainment for Telemundo in 1999.

== Cast ==
- Christian Meier as Alfonso Hidalgo
- Bárbara Mori as Santa
- Alejandra Borrero as Julia
- Isabella Santodomingo as Kathy
- Mara Croatto as Helena
- Jorge Martínez as Don Felipe Rodríguez
- Zully Montero as Margot Hidalgo
- Raúl Xiques as Lorenzo
- Marisol Calero as Jasmina
- Luis Mesa as Luciano
- Maricela González as Fefa
- Carlos Mantilla as Óscar
- Laura Termini as Laura
- Pedro Telémaco as Vicente
- Jonny Nessi as Mark
- Liz Colenadro as Tina
- Jetzabel Montero as Carmen
- Vicente Pasarielo as Darío
- Gloria Kennedy as Sara
- Eduardo Ibarrola
- Irán Daniels as Margarita
- Alexandra Rozo Navarro as Alexandra
- José Capote as Carlos
- Griselda Noguera as Petra
- Sergio Meyer as Rafael
- María Corina Marrero as Clara
