= Pepillo =

Pepillo is a pet form of the Spanish name José. Pepillo may refer to:

== People ==
- Pepillo Salcedo (1816–1814), head of state of the Dominican Republic
  - Pepillo Salcedo, Dominican Republic, municipality in the Dominican Republic named after the head of state
- Pepillo Romero (born 1878), Cuban baseball player
- Pepillo (footballer, born 1916), Spanish footballer born José Díaz Payán
- Pepillo (footballer, born 1934), Spanish footballer born José García Castro
- Pepillo, central character in the 2009 television film Expecting a Miracle
