= Alejandro Chabán =

Venezuelan actor (born 1981)

- Born: Alejandro José Chabán Rodríguez; August 20, 1981 (age 45); Maturín, Venezuela
- Occupations: Actor, host, author, consultant
- Years active: 2001–present
- Relatives: María Alejandra Chabán (sister)

Alejandro Chabán (born Alejandro José Chabán Rodríguez on August 20, 1981), is a Venezuelan actor, television host, author and certified consultant on nutrition and wellness. Chaban has participated in several Latin American telenovelas and series. He also lent his voice for the video game, L.A. Noire, as "Gabriel Delgado".

== Filmography ==
Films
Year	Title	Role	Notes
2004	Amor en concreto	Tony, the boy	
2005	Bettie Page: la chica de las revistas	Armand	
2008	Reservations	Tito	
2010	The Perfect Game	Javier	

Television
Year	Title	Role	Notes
2001	Viva la Pepa	Robe	TV Debut
2001–02	A calzón quitao	Amílcar José	Supporting role
2003	Engañada	Daniel Viloria Ruiz Montero	Supporting role
2004	Prisionera	Ronaldo "Rony" Simancas	Supporting role
2005	La ley del silencio	Tomás	Co-lead role
2006	Monk	Pablo Ortiz	"Mr. Monk Goes to a Fashion Show" (Season 4, Episode 10)
2006–07	Decisiones	Gerardo / Luis	Episode: "Zorro con piel de oveja" Episode: "Eterna juventud"
2008	12 Miles of Bad Road	Julio Vera	Episode: "Pilot" (Season 1, Episode 1); Episode: " The Dirty White Girl" (Season 1, Episode 2)
2008	El Rostro de Analía	Miguel Palacios	Recurring role
2009	Amores de luna 2: Nuevos caminos	Carlos Cuevas	Episode: "Sr. Arenas" (Season 2, Episode 1)
2009	The Mentalist	Snake Gallidos	Episode: "Throwing Fire" (Season 2, Episode 10)
2010–11	Eva Luna	Tony Santana	Recurring role
2011	Mira quién baila	Himself	Season 2
2015–16	¡Despierta América!	Himself	Host

Video Game
Year	Title	Role	Notes
2011	L.A. Noire	Gabriel Delgado	Voice
