= Perro amor (American TV series) =

- Genre: Telenovela
- Screenplay by: Juana Uribe; María Clara Torres; Sebastián Sánchez; Roberto Stopello; Ana María Parra
- Story by: Juana Uribe; Andrés Salgado
- Directed by: Luis Manzo; David Posada
- Creative director: Óscar Cortés
- Starring: Carlos Ponce; Ana Lucía Domínguez; Maritza Rodríguez; Khotan Fernández; Maritza Bustamante; Zully Montero; Elluz Peraza; Víctor Cámara; Rodrigo de la Rosa; Natalia Ramírez; Raúl Arrieta; Martha Picanes; Rosalinda Rodríguez; Carlos Ferro; Dayana Garroz; Silvana Arias; Manolo Coego Jr.; Fred Valle; Roberto Huicochea; Freddy Viquez; Roberto Levermann; Frank Falcon; Carlos Garin; Adrián Carvajal; Marko Figueroa; Veronica Montes; Patricia de León; Paola Campodonico
- Theme music composer: Carlos Ponce; Joel Someillán
- Opening theme: "Perro amor" by Carlos Ponce
- Country of origin: United States
- Original language: Spanish
- No. of episodes: 129

Production
- Executive producer: Aurelio Valcárcel Carroll
- Producer: Jairo Arcila
- Cinematography: Joseph Martínez; Juan Pablo Puentes; Miguel Font
- Editors: Carlos Sarda; Hader Antivar Duque
- Camera setup: Multi-camera
- Production company: Telemundo Studios

Original release
- Network: Telemundo
- Release: January 11 – July 19, 2010

Related
- Niños ricos, pobres padres; El fantasma de Elena; Perro amor (Colombian TV series)

Perro amor (Dog Love) is a Spanish-language telenovela produced by the United States–based television network Telemundo that originally ran in the United States from January to July 2010. This is a Colombian remake of the 1998 Cenpro Televisión daily telenovela Perro amor, written by Natalia Ospina and Andrés Salgado. The 2010 series stars Ana Lucía Domínguez and Carlos Ponce as the two main characters, with Maritza Rodriguez playing the villain. As with most of its other telenovelas, Telemundo broadcast English subtitles as closed captions on CC3.

In 2010, Advertising Age noted that "the narrative arc of Perro amor involves a lot of driving".

== Plot ==
Set in Miami, Florida, Perro amor tells the story of two cousins: Antonio "El Perro" Brando (Carlos Ponce) and Camila Brando (Maritza Rodríguez) who have been sleeping with each other because of a bet they made when they were teenagers. Their pact has resulted in a passionate and adventurous sex life where anything goes. The bet however is under the condition that neither falls in love with the other nor are they allowed to fall in love with anyone else. If either of them falls in love with the other or anyone else, that person loses the bet.

The two have sex on the morning of Antonio's wedding where he is to marry Daniela (Maritza Bustamante), the daughter of his father's business partner. Before Antonio leaves for his wedding, Camila reminds him of their bet, knowing that he wouldn't leave Daniela at the altar since Daniela's dad is the largest investor in their family's construction company. Antonio spots the caterer's daughter, Sofia (Ana Lucía Domínguez) through the window while getting dressed and takes an interest in her. During the wedding ceremony, Antonio goes through with Camila's bet and refuses to say "I do" and leaves Daniela at the altar. Antonio's behavior jeopardizes an important development project that the Brando Family fortune is tied up in, leaving the Brando's on the brink of bankruptcy.

Meanwhile, the cash-pressed Brando Family business deceive Dagoberto (Gerardo Riveron), the representative of the group of poor homeowners who are said to benefit from the project that Daniela's father is investing in. The Brando's take ownership of the houses in the neighborhood however a significant portion of the family are not aware that the houses were built for the poor homeowners as the project was head by Camila and her husband Gonzalo (Rodrigo de la Rosa). The Brando's refuse to pay damages to Dagoberto and he kills himself to avoid facing the neighbors who trusted him. His son, Rocky (Khotan Fernández) an honest young man, who dreams of being a musician vows to take revenge on the Brando family.

The economic future of the construction company, the neighborhood and the family is at stake as a result of Camila and Antonio's bet. Antonio's father, Pedro (Victor Camara), cuts him off for being irresponsible. Antonio learns more about Sofia and her honest upbringing and decides to propose to Sofia in an attempt to show his father that he has matured and is willing to make an honest living but Sofia declines his proposal because of his past behaviors and wants nothing to do with him. Camila, who refuses to acknowledge her love for Antonio tries to win him back by making life impossible for both him and Sofia, whom she hates because Antonio has fallen in love her.

Sometime later it is revealed that Camila is not a Brando at all and that her mother and "father" were just friends since her "father" was closeted. Her biological father is a man named Luigi Dorado, a drifter who mostly takes advantage of women. It is revealed that Luigi knew about Camila and blackmailed her mother for money in return for his 30 years of silence. Around this time Luigi enters into a relationship with Cecilia (Zully Montero), Antonio's grandmother and matriarch of the Brando family as a ploy to scare Camila into thinking that he will reveal he truth of her paternity to Cecilia. It is later revealed that Cecilia knew that her son wasn't Camila's father. Cecilia, suspecting that Luigi's intentions weren't genuine, asks Rosario, Sofia's mother and her best friend, Ligia's daughter to try and find out what Luigi is up to. Luigi deduces Cecilia's plan and attempts to rape Rosario but police arrive before Luigi can commit the act and is sentenced to jail for attempted rape. Camilla, growing tired of Luigi's blackmailing, decides to have him killed. He is attacked by Alejandro Vallejo, a fellow prisoner, paid by Jairo Chaparro in exchange for his freedom. The plan fails as Luigi wasn't killed but injured and Chaparro never intended to free Vallejo and only used him for his dirty work. Later Camila posts Luigi's bail, in hopes that he forgives and forgets about everything that transpired.

Meanwhile Antonio and Sofia grow closer and marry despite Camila's attempts to separate them. Rocky who also has feelings for Sofia, tries to persuade her against marrying Antonio. It becomes apparent that Camila and Rocky's respective feelings for Sofia and Antonio and their meddling are the reasons that the couple always get into arguments and misunderstandings.

Despite his marriage to Sofia, Antonio struggles with his addiction for sex and continues to conduct his trysts with Camila and other women. When Sofia finds out that she's pregnant, she is excited and goes to the club where Antonio works to tell him but finds him having sex with another woman. This infuriates her and struggles with the decision to end her marriage.

Antonio realizes that he loves Sofia and decides to break off the bet with Camila and stop conducting affairs with other women. He decides to seek counseling for his sex addiction. Antonio returns from rehab after six months just as Sofia reaches the last stages of her pregnancy. He makes an effort to be a model father and a good husband but Sofia has grown tired of Antonio's past antics and is determined to file for divorce. Nany, one of Antonio's past lovers comes back in town and tells Antonio about her AIDS diagnosis. Antonio goes into a state of shock and doesn't show up for the birth of his and Sofia's child. Sofia gets upset because she had begun to believe that Antonio has changed and delivers their child, a boy, on her own.

Camila finds out about Nany's status and thinks that Antonio is HIV positive. She tells Sofia that about the Antonio's HIV status and believes that both Sofia and her son are both positive as well. The news about Antonio's HIV status spreads and everyone who had sexual history with both Antonio and Camila are worried that they could be infected too, causing a big problem as Antonio had many sexual partners. After a slight scare, and after several blood tests, it's discovered that everyone is negative. Camilla claims to be positive in an attempt to get closer with Gonzalo after he seemingly started falling for Daniela. Camila and Gonzalo realize that their scheming is catching up to them and plan one final big heist, by selling multiple properties twice, and defrauding every 2nd buyer (being that the first buyer would be the legitimate buyer, and everyone after that, invalid) and keeping the money. But their plot is exposed, and Gonzalo ends up in jail while Camila is kept free after she blamed all of the fraud on him despite being the mastermind behind it all. Camila, now working alone, enlists the help of Chaparro once again. Chaparro decides they need to put all the fraud money that Camila and Gonzalo embezzled and into a bank account in the Bahamas, under a fake name, the fake name being "Alejandro Vallejo", the same prisoner who he promised earlier to release from jail, and didn't. A problem arises, when the Alejandro finds out their plan. He blackmails Chaparro and as a result Chaparro calls for Vallejo's death and has it arranged to look like a suicide. Gonzalo who had just been in the room with Vallejo, realizes that it was not a suicide after all, and that he was ordered to be killed.

Meanwhile Luigi, who has since been in a legitimate relationship with Clemencia, Antonio's mother and Pedro's estranged wife realizes that Camila may be the real criminal behind everything that's going on. It is revealed that Luigi visited Vallejo in prison the day he was murdered and Vallejo told him everything he knew and warned that if he was killed, it would have been Chaparro's doing since Vallejo himself was asked to kill Luigi earlier, he was fully aware of what Chaparro was capable of. Vallejo also revealed and provided proof that Chaparro was behind the money laundering scheme.

Meanwhile Rocky has found success and lets his fame go to his head. He becomes arrogant and unpleasant to everyone around him, only being driven by only two things, revenge on the Brandos for his father's suicide and his love for Sofia. Benny quits the band because of Rocky's behavior.

Antonio, realizing Sofia doesn't want to be with him anymore and refusing to go back to Camila, meets and falls in love with a veterinarian called Miranda (Angélica Celaya). Sofia also gives in to Rocky's advances and falls in love with him and they become engaged. Around this time, Cecilia is suffers from heart disease and is in need of a heart transplant leaving Sofia and Pedro to run the company, trying to undo the bad deeds of Camila and Gonzalo. Gonzalo later exposes Camila and Jairo's plan. When Camila gets word of the developments, she decides she to kill Cecilia in the hospital and nearly succeeds but Cecilia is saved by Antonio and Miranda. Camila's attempt to kill Cecilia only makes her heart transplant more urgent.

Luigi, knowing all the truth, prepares to kill Jairo for all the misdeeds he has committed, and it culminates into a shootout, where Luigi is killed. Luigi turns out to be an organ donor and his heart is given to Cecilia. Cecilia fully recovers and develops a new plan to save her company and resolve the issues of the poor homeowners.

Camila and Jairo team up again to kidnap Sofia's baby and escape from the country but when the police corner her, Camila fatally shoots herself on a boat. Sofia breaks off her engagement to Rocky and reveals she is still in love with Antonio. Antonio proposes to Marinda because he believes that it would be hopeless to pursue Sofia now that she's a married woman but calls off his engagement when he finds out that Sofia never married Rocky. He declares his love for Sofia and the two begin to work on their relationship now that they're both single. Antonio and Sofia get married and live happily together raising their son.

== Main cast ==
Actor	Character	Known as
Carlos Ponce	Antonio "El Perro" Brando	Main Hero, Nicolas' father Camilia's ex-lover/cousin Sofía's ex-husband Miranda's ex-fiancé Was in love with Sofía Pedro and Clemencia's son Cecilia's grandson Married Sofía again in the end
Ana Lucía Domínguez	Sofía Santana	Main Heroine, Nicolas' mother Antonio's ex-wife Rocky's ex-fiancé Was in love with Antonio Angel and Rozario's daughter Alejandro's sister Ligia's granddaughter Married Antonio again in the end"
Maritza Rodríguez	Camila Brando	Main villain, Luigi's daughter ex-lover of Antonio, in love with Antonio, ex-wife of Gonzalo, Goes to jail for fraud, is raped by Jairo, fatally shoots herself on the boat trying to flee the state
Khotan Fernández	Rocky Perez	singer, in love with Sofia Wants revenge in the Brando
Maritza Bustamante	Daniela Valdiri	Fernando's daughter, Antonio's ex-fiancé in love with Gonzalo
Zully Montero	Doña Cecilia de Brando	grandmother of Antonio and Camilla, mother of Pedro Luigi's ex-lover
Elluz Peraza	Clemencia de Brando	mother of Antonio, in love with Luigi, wife of Pedro, villain, later good
Víctor Camara	Pedro Brando	father of Antonio, in love with Veronica, husband of Clemencia Cecilia's son
Rodrigo de la Rosa	Gonzalo Caceres	Camila's ex-husband, in love with Daniela
Natalia Ramírez	Rosario Pinoz de Santana	alegaro and Sofia's mother, in love with Angel Married to angel
Raúl Arrieta	Diego Tamayo	Antonio's friend, later his traitor, has his own radio show
Martha Picanes	Ligia de Pinoz	best friend of Cecilia, Sofia's grandmother Rosario's mother
Rosalinda Rodriguez	Doña Beatriz Caparroso	Benny's mother, having Don Juaco's baby
Carlos Ferro	Benny Caparroso "El Pastelito"	singer, Rocky's best friend, in love with Veronica, Jenifer's ex lover
Dayana Garroz	Viviana	On-air DJ, in love with Juan Camilo
Silvana Arias	Veronica Jessica Murillo "La Vero"	best friend of Sofia, in love with Benny, had a fling with Don Pedro
Manolo Coego	Joaquin Valencia	father of Jennifer and Lorena, in love with Doña Beatriz Has a child with Beatriz
Fred Valle	Fernando Valdiri	Daniela's father Brando's business partner
Roberto Huicochea	Giardinis Murillo	Veronica's father, in love with Beatriz
Freddy Viquez	Jairo Chaparro	Camila's secret lookout in Rocky's neighborhood, villain In love with Camila arrest by the cops
Roberto Levermann	Usnavy Murillo	Veronica's brother
Frank Falcon	Juan Camilo Palacios	Lawyer of the Brando family and boyfriend of Viviana
Carlos Garin	Angel Santana	Sofia's father Rosario's husband and lover
Adrian Carvajal	Alejandro 'Alejo' Santana	Sofia's brother and dated Lorena, drug addict
Marco Figueroa	Marc	sailor, Jennifer's ex-husband and baby daddy
Veronica Montes	Lena	singer, friend of Rocky and Benny, in love with Rocky
Patricia de Leon	Jennifer Lopez	Marc's ex-wife, in love with Benny, sister of Lorena
Paola Campodonico	Lorena Lopez	Jennifer's sister and dated Alejo, ex-girlfriend of Benny

=== Special cast ===
Actor	Character	Known as
Jencarlos Canela	Jencarlos Canela	himself, at Diego's radio show, song Amor Quedate
Raul Izaguirre	Luigi Dorado	father of Camilla, lover of Clemencia (shot 5 times by Jairo died in the hospital)
Yoly Dominguez	Perla Mathis	sex-therapist of Antonio
Angélica Celaya	Miranda	new girl of Antonio, gets attacked by Camila
Alcira Gil	Lidia	mother of Jennifer, first wife of Joaquin, alcoholic
Andres Mistage		Antonio's friend
Jessica Caldrello	Danira	Secretary in Brando Company
Hector Alejandro	Araújo	Lawyer
Charles de la Rosa	Robert Almanza	
Charly Peña	George	
Yami Quintero	Barbara	
Ariel Diaz	Danilo de Mendoza	
Marisela González	Maria	
Jorge Celedon	Jorge Celedon	Himself
Jimmy Zambrano	Jimmy Zambrano	Himself
Carmen Olivares	Milena	
Samir Succar	Usmail Murillo	Veronica Jessica Murillo's brother, Giardinis Murillo's son
Victor Corona	Enrique	
Shafik Palis	Eduardo 'Lalo'	Son of Jennifer and Marc
Edna Roncallo	Cecilia	Rosario's best friend, has DEA
Yina Velez	Nany Mondragon	Camila's best friend, has AIDS

== International Broadcasters of Perro Amor ==
Pays	Chaîne	Titre	Série prémière
Turkey	Star TV Turkey	Aşkın iki yüzü	5 June Monday 2010
United States	Telemundo	Perro amor	11 janvier 2010
Costa Rica	Teletica	Perro amor	
Colombia	Caracol Televisión	Perro amor	
Croatia			
Ecuador	Ecuavisa	Perro amor	
Puerto Rico	Telemundo	Perro amor	11 janvier 2010
Armenia	TheShanttv		
Mexico	Galavisión	Perro amor	
Panama	TVN	Perro amor	
Spain	Nova 9	Perro amor	Perro amor
Dominican Republic	Telesistema 11	Perro amor	
Venezuela	Televen	Perro amor	
Chile	Chilevisión	Perro amor	
Paraguay	SNT	Perro amor	
Israel	Viva		
Argentina	Canal 9	Perro amor	
Peru	ATV	Perro amor	
Albania			
Serbia	Prva Srpska Televizija	Опасне игре	
Slovenia	POP TV		
Bulgaria	bTV/ bTV Lady	Жестока любов	
Romania	Acasa TV		
Lithuania	TV8		
Poland	Novela TV	Pieska miłość	
North Macedonia	Tera TV		
Bolivia	Unitel Bolivia	Perro amor	2014

== United States broadcast ==
- Release dates, episode name and length, and U.S. viewers based on Telemundo's broadcast.

Air date	Number	Title	Rating	Duration
11 January 2010	001	Gran lanzamiento	N/A	57 minutes
12.01.2010	002	Amores de estafa	N/A	42 minutes
13.01.2010	003	Redes seductoras	N/A	42 minutes
14.01.2010	004	Juego de máscaras	N/A	42 minutes
15.01.2010	005	Ruegos ahogados	N/A	42 minutes
18.01.2010	006	Trueque de amor	N/A	42 minutes
19.01.2010	007	Rumbo a la desgracia	N/A	42 minutes
20.01.2010	008	Guerra sucia	N/A	42 minutes
21.01.2010	009	Ángel guardián	N/A	42 minutes
22.01.2010	010	Ilusión del corazón	N/A	42 minutes
25.01.2010	011	Apuesta sexual	N/A	42 minutes
26.01.2010	012	Promesas fallidas	N/A	42 minutes
27.01.2010	013	Trampa de virginidad	N/A	42 minutes
28.01.2010	014	Seducir al Perro	N/A	42 minutes
01.02.2010	015	Perro celoso	N/A	42 minutes
02.02.2010	016	¿Pelea de orgullo?	N/A	42 minutes
03.02.2010	017	Orgullo herido	N/A	42 minutes
04.02.2010	018	Juegos con Sofía	N/A	42 minutes
05.02.2010	019	Sueno de lobos	N/A	42 minutes
08.02.2010	020	Pruebas extremas	N/A	42 minutes
09.02.2010	021	Sorpresa de compromiso	N/A	42 minutes
10.02.2010	022	Viaje desesperado?	N/A	42 minutes
11.02.2010	023	Trampa en vivo	N/A	42 minutes
12.02.2010	024	Amor de un Perro	N/A	42 minutes
15.02.2010	025	Víctima de amor	N/A	42 minutes
16.02.2010	026	Reto de hombría	N/A	42 minutes
17.02.2010	027	Celos retadores	N/A	42 minutes
18.02.2010	028	Perder la partida	N/A	42 minutes
19.02.2010	029	Retar instintos	N/A	42 minutes
22.02.2010	030	Jugadas sucias	N/A	42 minutes
23.02.2010	031	Novia humillada	N/A	42 minutes
24.02.2010	032	Duda en el altar	N/A	42 minutes
25.02.2010	033	Suenos de amor	N/A	42 minutes
26.02.2010	034	Traición y juegos	N/A	42 minutes
01.03.2010	035	Venganza sensual	N/A	42 minutes
02.03.2010	036	Mundo ajeno	N/A	42 minutes
03.03.2010	037	Doble cara	N/A	42 minutes
04.03.2010	038	Guerra de fieras	N/A	42 minutes
05.03.2010	039	Escándalo y elección	N/A	42 minutes
08.03.2010	040	Sin censura	N/A	42 minutes
09.03.2010	041	Gira de discordia	N/A	42 minutes
10.03.2010	042	Trampa de estafas	N/A	42 minutes
11.03.2010	043	Noticia de un embarazo	N/A	42 minutes
12.03.2010	044	Decisión herida	N/A	42 minutes
15.03.2010	045	Estafas culposas	N/A	42 minutes
16.03.2010	046	Ojos de Brando	N/A	42 minutes
17.03.2010	047	Pasado de perros	N/A	42 minutes
18.03.2010	048	Víctima de chantaje	N/A	42 minutes
19.03.2010	049	Juego que enloquece	N/A	42 minutes
22.03.2010	050	Con la misma moneda	N/A	42 minutes
23.03.2010	051	Apuesta y fracaso	N/A	42 minutes
25.03.2010	052	Perro arrepentido	N/A	42 minutes
26.03.2010	053	Acoso sexual	N/A	42 minutes
29.03.2010	054	Secretos de Camila	N/A	42 minutes
30.03.2010	055	Alianzas por amor	N/A	42 minutes
31.03.2010	056	Redes de mentira	N/A	42 minutes
01.04.2010	057	Secreto sexual	N/A	42 minutes
02.04.2010	058	Juego Perdido	N/A	42 minutes
05.04.2010	059	Juego sucio	N/A	42 minutes
06.04.2010	060	Maldad castigada	N/A	42 minutes
07.04.2010	061	Apuesta pública	N/A	42 minutes
08.04.2010	062	Amores sin futuro	N/A	42 minutes
09.04.2010	063	Rivales humilladas	N/A	42 minutes
12.04.2010	064	Humillación ambiciosa	N/A	42 minutes
13.04.2010	065	Ley divina	N/A	42 minutes
14.04.2010	066	Chantaje sentimental	N/A	42 minutes
15.04.2010	067	Límite obsesivo	N/A	42 minutes
16.04.2010	068	Juego de aliados	N/A	42 minutes
19.04.2010	069	Trampas sexuales	N/A	42 minutes
20.04.2010	070	Riesgo y peligro	N/A	42 minutes
21.04.2010	071	Hora cero	N/A	42 minutes
22.04.2010	072	Presa de pánico	N/A	42 minutes
23.04.2010	073	Amor y temor	N/A	42 minutes
26.04.2010	074	Amor en negativo	N/A	42 minutes
27.04.2010	075	Mundo perdido	N/A	42 minutes
28.04.2010	076	Trampas del destino	N/A	42 minutes
30.04.2010	077	Máscaras sensibles	N/A	42 minutes
03.05.2010	078	Deseos ocultos	N/A	42 minutes
04.05.2010	079	Peleas provocadas	N/A	42 minutes
05.05.2010	080	Siguiendo huellas	N/A	42 minutes
06.05.2010	081	Partida de celos	N/A	42 minutes
11.05.2010	082	Juego de culpables	N/A	42 minutes
12.05.2010	083	Trampa de maldad	N/A	42 minutes
14.05.2010	084	Rivales de nuevo	N/A	42 minutes
17.05.2010	085	Sensualidad perdida	N/A	42 minutes
18.05.2010	086	Idilio de fuerzas	N/A	42 minutes
19.05.2010	087	Ojo por ojo	N/A	42 minutes
20.05.2010	088	Guerra por celos	N/A	42 minutes
21.05.2010	089	Juego perdido	N/A	42 minutes
24.05.2010	090	Negocios dudosos	N/A	42 minutes
25.05.2010	091	Víctima de su trampa	N/A	42 minutes
26.05.2010	092	Culpa del perro	N/A	42 minutes
27.05.2010	093	Aliados temporales	N/A	42 minutes
31.05.2010	094	Sentencia de muerte	N/A	42 minutes
01.06.2010	095	Alianza y chantaje	N/A	42 minutes
02.06.2010	096	Pelea de conciertos	N/A	42 minutes
03.06.2010	097	Concierto de promesas	N/A	42 minutes
04.06.2010	098	Provocar celos	N/A	42 minutes
07.06.2010	099	Recoger pasos	N/A	42 minutes
08.06.2010	100	Ira de perro	N/A	42 minutes
09.06.2010	101	Llenarse de motivos	N/A	42 minutes
10.06.2010	102	Promesa final	N/A	42 minutes
11.06.2010	103	Pelea legal	N/A	42 minutes
14.06.2010	104	Trampas delictovas	N/A	42 minutes
15.06.2010	105	Leyes de rencor	N/A	42 minutes
16.06.2010	106	Futuro oscuro	N/A	42 minutes
17.06.2010	107	Aliado de trampas	N/A	42 minutes
18.06.2010	108	Venganza mortal	N/A	42 minutes
21.06.2010	109	Abismo mortal	N/A	42 minutes
22.06.2010	110	Ataque al alma	N/A	42 minutes
23.06.2010	111	Apuestas perdidas	N/A	42 minutes
24.06.2010	112	Veredicto final	N/A	42 minutes
25.06.2010	113	Promesa de mentiras	N/A	42 minutes
28.06.2010	114	Esperanza de Sofía	N/A	42 minutes
29.06.2010	115	Perro derumbado	N/A	42 minutes
30.06.2010	116	Juego de hipocresía	N/A	42 minutes
01.07.2010	117	Sin límites	N/A	42 minutes
02.07.2010	118	Ironía heróica	N/A	42 minutes
05.07.2010	119	Sabotear corazones	N/A	42 minutes
06.07.2010	120	Juego de venganza	N/A	42 minutes
07.07.2010	121	Trampas de mentira	N/A	42 minutes
08.07.2010	122	Perro moribundo	N/A	42 minutes
09.07.2010	123	Apuesta de maldad	N/A	42 minutes
12.07.2010	124	Cartas fallidas	N/A	42 minutes
13.07.2010	125	Promesas falsas	N/A	42 minutes
14.07.2010	126	Juego de muerte	N/A	42 minutes
15.07.2010	127	Perder o ganar	N/A	42 minutes
16.07.2010	128	Boda de fantasía	N/A	42 minutes
19 July 2010	129	Gran final	N/A	42 minutes
