= La viuda de Blanco =

- Created by: Julio Jiménez
- Developed by: Telemundo Studios, Miami; RTI Producciones
- Written by: Patricia Cuba; Jenny Suarez
- Directed by: Julio Jiménez; Luis Manzo; Leonardo Galavis; David Posada
- Starring: Itatí Cantoral; Francisco Gattorno; Zully Montero; Alejandro Felipe
- Theme music composer: Alberto Slezynger; Pablo Caceres
- Composers: Alberto Slezynger; Jose luis Revelo
- Country of origin: United States
- Original language: Spanish
- No. of episodes: 158

Production
- Executive producer: Aurelio Valcárcel Carroll
- Producer: Alicia Avila
- Editor: Ivan Martinez
- Camera setup: Multi-camera
- Running time: 42-45 minutes

Original release
- Network: Telemundo
- Release: July 24, 2006 – March 2, 2007

Related
- La Tormenta; Dame Chocolate

La viuda de Blanco (double meaning: Blanco's Widow and The Widow in White) is an American telenovela that aired on Telemundo from July 24, 2006, to March 2, 2007. It is based on the 1996 Colombian telenovela of the same name. It stars Itatí Cantoral, Francisco Gattorno, Zully Montero, Lilibeth Morillo and Alejandro Felipe.

== Plot ==
A mysterious woman (Amador Blanco's wife) arrives in the town of Trinidad looking for her past. After years of imprisonment for a crime she did not commit, the beautiful widow Alicia Guardiola returns to claim her twin boys, who are being raised by their grandmother, the feared and respected Perfecta Albarracin. Perfecta has no intention of giving up her grandchildren without a fight, and enlists her son, the handsome Sebastian Blanco, to help her. On opposite sides of a battle to claim two precocious boys who share dreams and magical powers, Alicia and Sebastian find themselves falling in love, without even suspecting the dark consequences a relationship between them will bring.

The main conflict is Alicia's desire to get custody of her twins back. Since Alicia was put in prison for murdering her husband Amador, son of Perfecta, Perfecta got custody of Alicia's children. The story starts with Alicia just having been declared innocent of murder and released from prison. But while that is the main conflict, another conflict exists which the audience does not pay much attention to, namely how Perfecta is alienating her children by her drive to dominate them with an unforgiving spirit if they appear in her eyes to have done wrong or offended her. A crisis comes in this conflict as Perfecta realizes her error and speeds in a car to try to reach her daughter Haydee, who is leaving the country. But just before Perfecta's car catches up with Haydee's car, Haydee dies in a car crash. Eventually the audience learns that actually it is Perfecta who is the real viuda de Blanco, not Alicia! For Alicia had never been married to Perfecta's son, a scoundrel who tricked Alicia with a fake marriage using a fake priest. Moreover, we learn that Amador never died; that too was a fake death.

The story embodies a lot of comedy and repetition. The audience hears about what happened through minor characters or reported to others over the phone. The comedy comes to a screeching halt with the tragic death of Haydee. The moral of the story is to treat your children well before death makes that impossible.

== Cast ==
=== Main ===
- Itatí Cantoral as Alicia Guardiola
- Francisco Gattorno as Sebastian Blanco Albarracín
- Zully Montero as Doña Perfecta Albarracín vda. de Blanco
- Alejandro Felipe as Felipe and Duván Blanco Guardiola

=== Recurring ===
- Zharick León as Illuminada Urbina
- Lilibeth Morillo as Haydée Blanco Albarracín
- Flavio Caballero as Justino Briñón
- Jeannette Lehr as Professor Judith Cuestas
- Eduardo Ibarrola as Laurentino Urbina
- Rodolfo Jiménez as Comandante Pablo Ríos
- Manuel Balbi as Megateo
- Michelle Vargas as Valeria Sandoval
- Alfonso Diluca as Hipólto Reboyo
- Nury Flores as Blasina
- Pedro Moreno as Querubín
- Marcela Serna as Clarita
- Martha Pabón as Ofelia

=== Guest ===
- Carlos Camacho as Dimas Pantoja
- Martín Karpan as Amador Blanco Albarracín
- Renato Rossini as Fabio Huster
- Renato Lamborghini as Segundo Extra
