= Helios Fernández =

Colombian-Spanish actor

- Born: Helios Fernandez; August 16, 1940; Barcelona, Spain
- Died: October 2, 2004 (aged 64); Bogotá, Colombia
- Occupations: Actor and TV director
- Spouse: María Eugenia González

Helios Fernández (August 16, 1940 – October 2, 2004) was a Colombian-Spanish actor.

== Life ==
Fernández was born in Barcelona, Spain on August 16, 1940. He considered his primary nationality to be Colombian as he lived in the country for the most part of his life and became a naturalized citizen. He was the son of the actor and painter Domingo Fernández Adeba, brother of musician and also actor Leandro Fernández and Paola Fernández.

He studied in "Instituto Departamental de Bellas Artes" in Cali and was one of the founders of "Teatro Experimental de Cali" with Enrique Buenaventura. He was very well known in Colombia for his TV appearances in La casa de las dos palmas, Garzas al amanecer, Los pecados de Inés de Hinojosa, Amantes del desierto, El vuelo de la cometa and others. He also acted on the stage and served as a television director.

He died October 2, 2004, in Bogotá, Colombia.

== Selected filmography ==
- Sobrevivir (1995)
- La deuda (1997)
- La mujer del presidente (1997)
- Cartas de amor (1997)
- Amantes del desierto (2001)
- Rosario Tijeras (2005)
