= Rebeka Montoya =

American actress

- Born: March 9, 1979 (age 47); Fort Lauderdale, Florida
- Occupations: Actress, Singer

Rebeka Montoya is an American actress. Montoya is known for her recurring role as Delores Padilla in the ABC daytime soap opera, General Hospital, from 2011 to 2012. In 2014 she joined the cast of ABC comedy-drama series, Mistresses, as Antonia Ruiz. In 2004 Montoya had a role in the Telemundo telenovela Prisionera, and later guest-starred in Las Vegas, Castle, Southland, and Psych.

== Early life and career ==
Montoya was born on March 9, 1979 in Fort Lauderdale, Florida. From a Puerto Rican family, Montoya lived in her young adult years on the island, dividing her time between her role as an account executive for a company and her rock band Utopia, which she herself led and produced. In 2002 she was chosen to be part of the cast of the singing competition show Protagonistas de la Música, left everything: her job security, her apartment, her band and her homeland. While in the competition she shared that her favorite music is pop rock and her most admired artists include Shakira and Mariah Carey. She ended up as the female runner-up and appeared in 2 albums released by the show.

After the show ended on January 14, 2003, she continued to work with the show by traveling with the other finalists to promote the soundtrack albums released by the show. After her successful run as a singer, she ventured into the world of acting where she gained fame for role as Patricia in the telenovela Prisionera. She acted in a couple other novelas such as Anita, No Te Rajes but her biggest success came when she began having role in television shows in the United States, most notably for her role as Delores Padilla in General Hospital.

== Filmography ==
Year	Title	Role	Notes
2004	Prisionera	Patricia 'Patty' Salvatierra	Series regular, 150 episodes
2004-2005	¡Anita, no te rajes!	Young Consuelo Guerrero	2 episodes
2006	Convincing Benny	Jesse	Short film
2005-2006	Eve	Lisa	Recurring role, 3 episodes
2006	Las Vegas	Maria Hurtado	Episode: "Coyote Ugly"
2007	Caregiver	Monique	Direct-to-video
2008	Crash and Burn	Mareya	Television film
2008	Dark Reel	2nd AC	
2009	Expecting a Miracle	Television film	Television film
2009	The Gold & the Beautiful	Estelle	
2009	The Storm	Gracia	Television film
2010	Castle	Ana Rivera	Episode: "Suicide Squeeze"
2010	Southland	Mariella Moretta	Episode: "What Makes Sammy Run?"
2011	NCIS: Los Angeles	Hostess	Episode: "Plan B"
2011	Platinum Illusion	Angela	
2011	The Protector	Patty Wyatt	Episode: "Bangs"
2011-2012	General Hospital	Delores Padilla	Recurring role
2012	The Man That Worked	Cecila	Short film
2013	Psych	Rita Quinn	Episode: "No Trout About It"
2013	Anger Management	Carlita	2 episodes
2014-2015	Mistresses	Antonia Ruiz	Recurring role
2017	One Day at a Time	Rebecca	Episode: "Quinces"
2017	Scorpion	Dr. Silva	Episode: "Monkey See, Monkey Poo"
2017	Criminal Minds: Beyond Borders	Ana Sofia	Episode: "La Huesuda"
2017	Grey's Anatomy	Marisela	Episode: "In the Air Tonight"
2021	The Neighborhood	Daisy	Episode: "Welcome to the Splurge"
2021	9-1-1	Leandra Castillo	Episode: "Wrapped in Red"
2022	This Is Us	Julie	2 episodes
2022	Magnum P.I.	Clara Bolton	Episode: "Remember Me Tomorrow"
2023	With Love	Tia Anita	Episode: "Thanksgiving:
2026	High Potential	Mayra Taylor	Episode: "Under the Rug"
