= Khotan Fernández =

Mexican actor

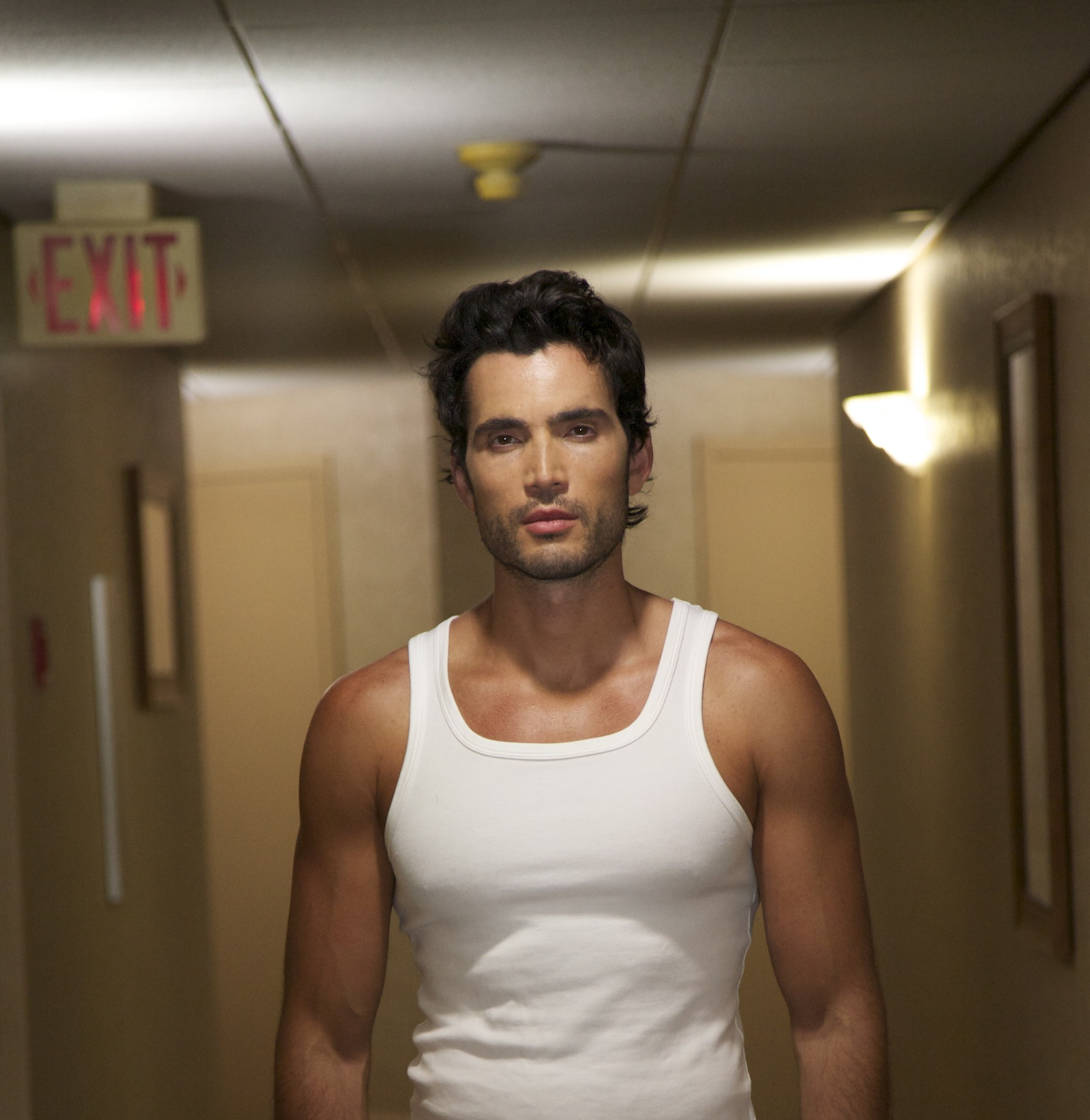
- Born: Khotan Fernández Tapajós; Mexico City, Mexico
- Occupations: Actor, producer
- Children: 1

Khotan Fernández, born Khotan Fernández Tapajós, is a Mexican actor.

== Early life ==
Khotan Fernandez was born in Mexico city, the son of Brazilian actress/singer Rosana Tapajós. While traveling on vacation to Careyes, Mexico, Khotan was called to model for L'Uomo magazine by renowned photographer Nadir. This jump-started a modeling career which then led him to pursue acting. Some of his mentors include Sergio Jiménez, Adriana Barraza and Helena Rojo, a leading film, theater and television actress.

== Career ==
Khotan fernandez is a founding member of Chibal Entertainment. He holds a Bachelor's degree in Film and has begun directing his own projects. Among his directorial endeavors are the acclaimed shorts "Free Will It" and "Private Keys," both of which garnered nominations and awards. Currently, he is involved in his upcoming project "Fruta Verde," a film adaptation of Enrique Sernas' novel of the same title.

Khotan's career journey began in 1998 with a significant role as "Mercurio" in Mi Pequeña Traviesa, a production by Televisa. His versatility and talent led him to various roles in soap operas, including "Ransel" in Preciosa, "Humberto de Astolfi" in Amor Gitano, and "Valentino" in Alma Rebelde. He expanded his horizons by venturing into international soap operas, such as "Pablo" in "Vale Todo," produced by O Globo and Telemundo. Ecuavisa then offered him the lead role as "Alvaro Santos" in Yo vendo unos ojos negros.

In 2006, [Your Name] returned to Mexico to portray "Sergio" in Corazón Partido, a collaboration between Telemundo and Argos. Concurrently, he starred as "Caronte" in the movie El Cartel. Notably, Khotan captivated audiences with his portrayal of the antagonist "Angel" in the Telemundo series Dame Chocolate set in Miami. His talents continued to shine as he played the protagonist "David" in TV Azteca's Eternamente Tuya in 2009. More recently, he brought to life the character "Rocky Paris," an aspiring singer, in the Telemundo series Perro Amor.

In 2012, Khotan made his English-speaking debut with a guest appearance in the Royal Pains episode "Who's Your Daddy". This marked the beginning of a seven-episode stint on the show.Cordero, Rosy (22 August 2012). "Khotan Fernandez Talks 'Royal Pains' & His First English-Speaking Role". Latina.

In 2017, [Your Name] appeared in the music video "Ni Tú Ni Yo" by Jennifer Lopez.

Returning to Telemundo in 2018, Khotan portrayed Max Sullivan, a businessman leading a double life, in the soap opera "Al otro día del muro."

In addition, Khotan was a producer for the film "Iguana like the sun," which holds the distinction of being the first movie ever to premiere at the Palacio de Bellas Artes.

== Filmography ==
Television roles
Year	Title	Roles	Notes
1996	The Guilt	Unknown role	
1997	Mi pequeña traviesa	Ignacio / Mercurio	
1998	Preciosa	Ransel	
1999	Amor gitano	Humberto de Astolfi / Marques de Astolfi	
1999	Alma rebelde	Valentino	
2000	Carita de ángel	Alexis	
2000	Primer amor, a mil por hora	José Crescencio Martínez / Juan Romeo Montesinos	
2001	Primer amor, tres años después	José / Juan Romeo	Television film
2002	Vale todo	Pablo	
2003	Yo vendo unos ojos negros	Álvaro Santos de León	
2005	Corazón partido	Sergio Garza	
2007	Acorralada	Gerardo	
2007	Dame chocolate	Ángel Pérez	
2008	Deseo prohibido	David Ortega	
2009	Eternamente tuya	David Abascal	
2010	Perro amor	Rocky Pérez / Rocky Paris	
2011	El sexo débil	Álvaro Camacho	
2011	Una Maid en Manhattan	Miguel Morales	
2012–2015	Royal Pains	Rafa	7 episodes
2014	Isa	Borroso	Television film
2016	Graves	Arturo del Rey	6 episodes
2017	Girlfriend Killer	Nick Ruiz	Television film
2018	The Assassination of Gianni Versace: American Crime Story	Lazaro Quintana	Episode: "The Man Who Would Be Vogue"
2018	Al otro lado del muro	Max Sullivan	
2018–Present	The Oath (U.S. TV series)	Tito	Recurring role
