= Dame Chocolate =

American Spanish-language telenovela

- Developed by: Perla Farías
- Directed by: Emilia Lamonte
- Starring: Carlos Ponce; Génesis Rodríguez; María Antonieta de las Nieves
- Opening theme: Dame Chocolate by Carlos Ponce
- Country of origin: United States
- Original language: Spanish
- No. of episodes: 150

Production
- Executive producer: Aurelio Valcárcel Carroll
- Producer: Jairo Arcila
- Production locations: Miami, Florida
- Camera setup: Multi-camera
- Running time: 42-45 minutes

Original release
- Network: Telemundo
- Release: March 5 – October 5, 2007

Related
- La Viuda de Blanco; Pecados Ajenos

Dame Chocolate (International Title:Sweet Secret) is an American Spanish-language telenovela, which was produced by the United States-based television network Telemundo and aired from March 5 until October 5, 2007. This limited-run serial stars Génesis Rodríguez as a sweet, simple girl who leaves rural Mexico for Miami in the US to fulfill her destiny in the chocolate business. Elements of this romantic soap opera resemble Ugly Betty, the Tammy films, The Beverly Hillbillies and No Holds Barred.

Lionsgate Home Entertainment and Xenon Pictures released a four-disc DVD set of Dame Chocolate in the US on November 27, 2007. The abridged version runs over 13 hours. It includes English subtitles and carries a TV-PG rating.

== Plot ==
An awkward, shy girl named Rosita Amado (Génesis Rodríguez) grew up in the village of Xochilcacahuatel with humble, uncultured relatives who worship Ek Chuah, an ancient idol. When her grandfather Juan Amado (Héctor Suárez), known as "The Chocolate King", dies, she is the only person left who knows the secret Mayan recipe that built his corporate empire.

While Rosita has a curvaceous body, she also has a big nose and buck teeth. She falls madly in love with charming chocolatier Bruce Remington (Carlos Ponce), the handsome heir to a candy factory, Chocolate Supremo. Their lives will interlace when Juan chooses her to take his place and teaches her the secret recipe. Rosita heads to Florida to fulfill her grandfather's last wish, bringing her deaf great-aunt Dulce (María Antonieta de las Nieves), her uncle, Diosdado (Ricardo Chavez), and the rest of her extended family with her. (Telemundo publicity referred to them as an "assortment" of "uncouth relatives.")

Meanwhile, Bruce's mother Grace Remington (Kristina Lilley), an unscrupulous and overly ambitious woman (and Juan's stepdaughter) is claiming that the factory is near bankruptcy and ruthlessly plots against Rosita, becoming the young girl's most dedicated enemy. Grace wants the inheritance and the secret recipe and enlists the help of her son's lover Samantha Porter (Karla Monroig) to talk Bruce into seducing Rosita. When Bruce realizes that he truly loves Rosita, his mother has already plotted her downfall. Rosita must confront the Remington and fight for her grandfather's legacy. Meanwhile, Ángel Pérez (Khotan), a brutal, dangerous man from the past, threatens Rosita's fresh start.

Rosita finds romance, deception and betrayal as she searches for true happiness in a new world. She learns about the dangers of hatred, jealousy and vengeance. The heroine finds herself caught between two powerful forces: love and chocolate.

To continue the story, Bruce was going to marry Rosita, so of course his mother and Samantha tried to stop it by lying to Rosita and saying that Bruce was actually going to marry Samantha instead of Rosita. Rosita was heartbroken and she left the state with Ángel, swearing revenge on the Remingtons and Samantha Porter. Somewhere in Texas, she escaped an explosion at a restaurant and survived, but her family, friends, and enemies all assumed her dead. Rosita was then kidnapped by a criminal, and met a man who promised to make her better looking.

Rosita went to a show and transformed into a sexy, beautiful lady by way of plastic surgery that fixes her nose and teeth. She met again with Bruce (with her name changed to Violeta) and Bruce was attracted to her and pursued her. Bruce suspected that Violeta is Rosita, but Violeta was clever and didn't let Bruce know who she really was, and avoided showing Bruce her back since Rosita had a birthmark on her back and so did Violeta. All through this, Samantha was jealous that Bruce loved Violeta and ended up dying.

Later on Rosita finds out that Bruce really loves Violeta and tries to leave before it gets any worse, but Bruce kept pestering her and they ended up making love a few times. But Rosita was really afraid of hurting Bruce and ruining him once he finds out that she is really Rosita, and it doesn't help either that later on she begins to suspect that he is in fact innocent, and it was all Grace's fault, and he was oblivious to the plans of her downfall. Rosita then continues on with her plans of revenge and takes legal action against the Remingtons because of all the pain they put her through and how they stole her grandfather's factory away from her, and took her inheritance back. Once Bruce finds out that Violeta and Rosita are the same person, he is very angry, but then spills his heart out to her, and she ends up rejecting him. This leads him to hate her. Bruce, in an attempt to move on, falls mildly in love with, and marries Samantha's twin sister, Debora. Bruce later finds out that Lorenzo, the gardener at his home and the man who saw him grow up and knows everything about him, is in fact his biological father instead of the late Mr. Remington, due to a night spent with Grace Remington herself.

Rosita continues being good friends with Fabián, and this makes Bruce insanely jealous because of how Fabián once told him that he liked Violeta, and he was always by Rosita's side. But besides that fact, Rosita continued to love Bruce and Bruce loved her even though he was married. Rosita realized that she was pregnant with Bruce's child, and when she went to tell the news to Bruce, she encountered Debora at his apartment in nothing but one of Bruce's shirts, and Rosita immediately assumed the worst. So Bruce doesn't find out about the baby until much, much later.

Bruce finds out about the pregnancy one night when he comes to Rosita's house with plans to see Lorenzo, but encounters Rosita in the pool instead. He sees her bare belly and she admits that she is pregnant. Debora and Fabián at least realized that their couples didn't love them, so they vowed to allow Bruce and Rosita space to rekindle their love. Rosita was kidnapped by Ángel and Grace after a party for months until it was almost time for the baby to be born. Rosita told Grace that her child was Bruce's, and she changed her mind about killing the baby because she hadn't known this, so she attacked Ángel so Rosita could escape once she began to go into labor. Grace ended up killing Ángel, in the tussle that ensued and got stabbed herself in the process.

Finally when Rosita escaped from Ángel she found a place to give birth in the basement of a house, Bruce was called by Grace and she told him where Rosita was, and he found Rosita while she was in labor and helped her to give birth to their baby. At the end Ángel died by getting stabbed by Grace's hand, and Grace died because she went a little crazy at the end and followed the face of Juan Amado into a lake and drowned. Bruce and Rosita ended up together again with their child.

== Cast ==
- Carlos Ponce as Bruce Remington - Main hero
- Génesis Rodríguez as Rosita Amado/Violeta Hurtado - Main heroine
- Kristina Lilley as Grace Remington - Mother of Bruce, villain (drowned)
- Ricardo Chávez as Diosdado Amado - Uncle of Rosita, in love with Julia
- Khotan Fernández as Ángel Pérez - Obsessed with Rosita, villain (killed by Grace)
- Karla Monroig as Samantha Porter / Deborah Porter - In love with Bruce, villain (Killed by the police) / Samantha's twin, also in love with Bruce (dies from leukemia)
- María Antonieta de las Nieves as Dulce Amado - Great-aunt of Rosita, mother of Diosdado and Hortensia
- Hector Suarez as Juan Amado - Owner of the Chocolate Factory grandfather of Rosita Amado brother of dulce amado
- Rosalinda Rodríguez as Hortensia Amado - Mother of Azucena, aunt of Rosita, in love with Mauricio
- Eduardo Serrano as Lorenzo Flores / Lorenzo Amado - Father of Bruce, half-brother of Dulce and Juan
- Jullye Giliberti as Julia Arismendi - Best friend of Samantha, in love with Diosdado
- Gustavo Franco as Mauricio Duque - Lawyer, father of Fabián, in love with Hortensia
- Riczabeth Sobalvarro as Eulalia - Maid at Remington mansion, in love with Ángel, then with Anacleto
- Frank Falcon as Dr. Bob - Best friend of Bruce, in love with Ligia
- Jessica Pacheco as Ligia - Maid at Remington mansion, in love with Diosdado, then with Dr. Bob
- Adriana Acosta as Matilde - Maid at Remington mansion
- Taniusha Capote as Azucena Amado - Cousin of Rosita, in love with Jose
- Pedro Moreno as José Gutierrez - In love with Azucena
- Victor Corona as Anacleto - Worker at Remington factory, in love with Hortensia, then with Eulalia
- Carmen Olivares as Carmen - Friend of Hortensia
- Bernhard Seifert as Eduardo - Employee at Remington factory (killed by Ricardo)
- Alvaro Ruiz as Luis - Butler at Remington mansion, transgender
- Jose Ramon Blanch as Ricardo Solis - Lawyer, in love with Julia, villain
- Freddy Viques as Matias - Worker at Remington factory
- Carlos Ferro as José's friend
- Gresssandro as Milton - Deborah and Samantha cousin, villain
- Mauricio Ochmann as Fabián Duque - Photographer, in love with Rosita

== Cast and story changes ==
When Telemundo announced Dame Chocolate in May 2006, the cast included Mauricio Ochmann as Bruce, Zharick Leon as Samantha and Erick Elías as Ángel. All three performers moved to other Telemundo serials. Ochmann left for Marina, Leon went to La Viuda de Blanco and Elias joined Zorro: La Espada y La Rosa. They were replaced by Carlos Ponce, Karla Monroig, and Khotan Fernández. In addition, Venezuelan singer José Luis Rodríguez, father of star Génesis Rodríguez was also announced as part of the cast, but did not appear.

Along with cast changes, Telemundo also made a major story shift. Rosita was originally to love Ángel Pérez, who was engaged to another woman. The story that aired portrayed Ángel as a villainous murderer and sexual predator.

After leaving Marina, Ochmann eventually rejoined the cast of Dame Chocolate. He took the role of Fabián Duque, a fashion photographer who falls for Rosita. His first air date was on June 13, 2007.

== Product placement ==
Telemundo made product placement deals with The Clorox Company, Ford, IKEA, and other companies to promote their brands during the show. Clorox cleaning products can be seen throughout the Remington home, for example. These product placements are digitally altered to match the products available in each country airing the show.

In addition, characters made excursions to Lowe's, Wal-Mart and Universal Studios Florida. Also, IKEA designed two bedroom sets for the show, "designed to reflect the culturally distinct style of two of the Latina characters." It displayed the furnishings in selected stores. The promotion also planned "program vignettes" during the broadcast, featuring actresses Karla Monroig and Kristina Lilley.

Wal-Mart received a "featured role" on Dame Chocolate. Part of an episode was filmed at a supercenter in Hialeah, Florida Wal-Mart also agreed to do promotions in stores and online. The chain previously did a marketing deal for Watch Over Me.

== Production notes ==
As with most of its other soap operas, Telemundo broadcasts English subtitles as closed captions on CC3. Originally, it scheduled 120 installments and extended its run to 130 episodes. This show is also known as Sweet Secret. It is filmed in Miami and some scenes were shot on location on the Rickenbacker Causeway.

The name Dame Chocolate is a bilingual pun. It means "give me chocolate" in Spanish. It also implies that Rosita fills the role of the dame of chocolate, referring to the traditional English title of nobility. Génesis Rodríguez was made less attractive with a false nose and teeth to play the innocent Rosita.

=== Ratings ===
Telemundo touted Dame Chocolate as a ratings success, with May 2007 sweeps ratings up 34 percent among Hispanic adults ages 18–34. The show also won its time slot among those viewers in New York and Miami. The next month, Dame's time slot (which included one soccer preemption) averaged 591,000 core adult viewers (ages 18 to 49), according to Nielsen Media Research.

=== Dame Chocolate in other media ===
Top Chef: Miami shot the "Latin Lunch" episode (in English) on the Remington Mansion exterior set featuring Rodriguez and Lilley, along with Natallia Streignard of Las Brujas de South Beach. Contestants were told to create an authentic Latin meal. The episode debuted on Bravo on July 18, 2007.. One contestant mentions Dame Chocolate is "huge in Mexico", although it was never widely broadcast in that country.
