= Pedro Moreno (actor) =

Cuban actor and model

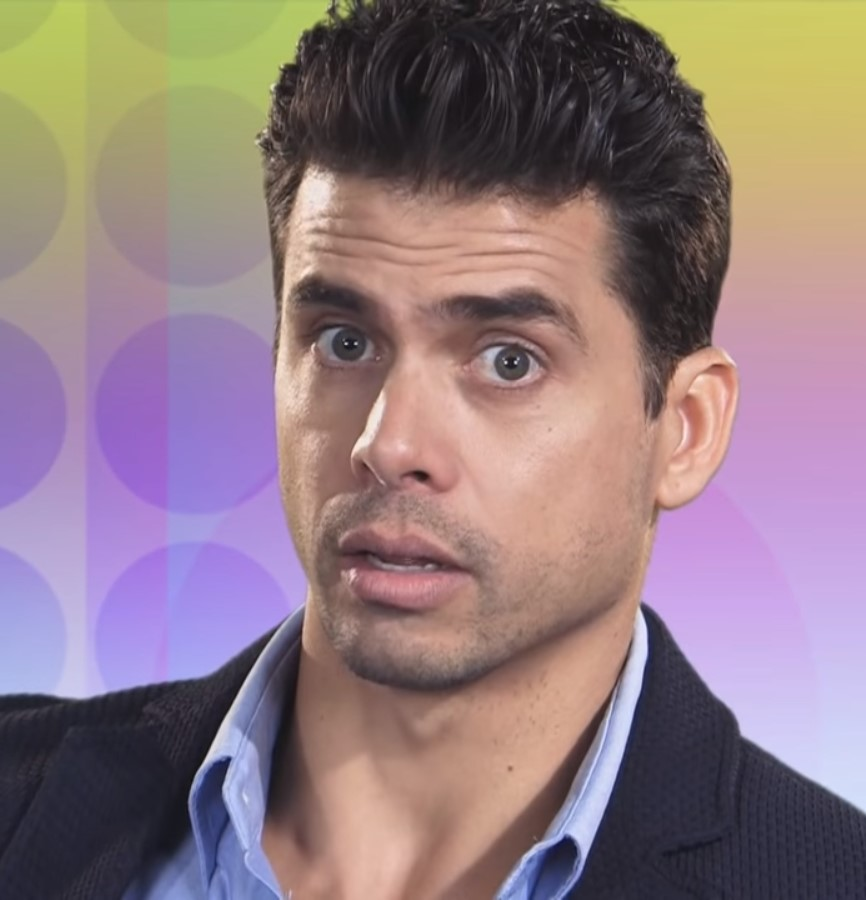
- Moreno in 2014
- Born: September 14, 1980 (age 45); La Habana, Cuba
- Occupation: Actor
- Years active: 2003–present
- Spouse: Bárbara Estévez (m. 2008)
- Children: 3

Pedro Moreno (born September 14, 1980) is a Cuban actor and model. He lives in Miami with his wife and 3 children.

== Career ==
He debuted on a reality show call Protagonistas de novela primera temporada, has worked in telenovelas such as Amor Descarado, La Mujer en el espejo, La viuda de blanco, among others. He was also named by People magazine as one of the 25 most beautiful Hispanic men.

In 2010, participates in the Sacrificio de Mujer telenovela of Venevision, playing Braulio Valdés.

In 2011, he joined the ranks of Televisa, was chosen for the Mexican soap opera Una familia con suerte of the hand of executive producer Juan Osorio. He acts as Enzo Rinaldi, father of Monica Rinaldi (Violeta Isfel).

In 2013 and 2019, participates in the dancing show "Mira Quien Baila" season 4 of Univision and in the telenovela "Cosita Linda" of Venevision acting as a villain named Olegario Pérez.

In 2014, he has a lead role in the telenovela "Voltea Pa' Que Te Enamores" as Rodrigo Karam. At the same year he works as host presenter in 8th season of "Nuestra Belleza Latina".

He returns to Televisa in 2015 for acting as lead role in telenovela "Amor de Barrio". In the 2016, he participates as lead role in telenovela "Tres veces Ana". Also he appeared on the movies "Jesus de Nazareth" and "La hora de Salvador Romero".

He joined the cast of telenovela "Me declare Culpable". Currently, he is in the Mexican version of the hit Broadway musical Chicago, playing the lead male character of Billy Flynn.

== Filmography ==
=== Films ===
Year	Title	Role	Notes
2007	Tómalo suave	Ricky	Television film
2010	Loving the Bad Man	Manny	
2010	Hunted by Night	Boy	
2015	Morir soñando	Vincent	
2016	Jesús de Nazareth	Tomás	
2017	La hora de Salvador Romero	Salvador	

=== Theater ===
Year	Title	Role	Notes
2015	"Broadway Musical Mame"		
2019-2020	"Mexico Broadway Musical Chicago"	Billy Flynn	

=== Television ===
Year	Title	Role	Notes
2002	Protagonistas de novela	Himself	Television debut
2003	Los Teens	Méndez	Recurring role
2003	Amor descarado	Rubén García	Supporting role
2004	La mujer en el espejo	Nino Arrebato	Supporting role
2006	La viuda de Blanco	Querubín	Supporting role
2007	Dame chocolate	José Gutiérrez	Recurring role
2008	El Rostro de Analía	Cristóbal Colón	Recurring role
2010	Burn Notice	Vaughn's Lookout	Episode: "Last Stand" (Season 4, Episode 18)
2011	Sacrificio de mujer	Braulio Valdes	Recurring role
2011-2012	Una familia con suerte	Enzzo Rinaldi	Supporting role
2013	Corona de lágrimas	Juez Corona	9 episodes
2013-2014	Cosita linda	Olegario Pérez	Main cast
2014	Nuestra Belleza Latina	Himself (Host)	(Season 8)
2014	Voltea pa' que te enamores	Rodrigo Karam	Lead role
2015	Hasta el fin del mundo	Ranku	7 episodes
2015	Amor de barrio	Raúl Lopezreina	Lead role
2016-2017	Tres veces Ana	Iñaki Nájera	Main cast
2017-2018	Me declaro culpable	Julián Soberón	Main cast
2021	La desalmada	Caimán	Guest star
2021	Contigo sí	Josué	Guest star
2022	Amor dividido	Amaury Ramirez	Supporting role
2023	Amores que engañan	Carlos Falcón "Charly"	Supporting role
2024	Tu vida es mi vida	Rafael "Rafa" Castillo Ibáñez	Supporting role
2025	A.mar, donde el amor teje sus redes	Gabriel	

== Prizes and awards ==
=== Prizes ===
Year	Prize	Category	Participation in	Results
2012	Premios TVyNovelas	Best co-lead actor	Una familia con suerte	Nominated
2012	People en Español	Best supporting actor	Una familia con suerte	Nominated
2013	Special Beauty Awards	Galán de la televisión	Cosita linda	Winner
2014	50 mas bellos	Actor	People en Español	Winner

=== Awards ===
Year	Award	Organization
2015	Trayectoria como Actor	Asociación Nacional de Locutores de México
2016	Trayectoria artistica	Galeria Plaza de las Estrellas
