= La venganza (2002 TV series) =

- Genre: Romance - Action, Drama, Crime, Suspense, Mystery
- Created by: Humberto 'Kico' Olivieri
- Developed by: Caracol Televisión; Telemundo; RTI Colombia
- Written by: Humberto 'Kico' Olivieri; Luis Colmenares; Gabriela Dominguez; Carolina Diaz
- Directed by: Rodrigo Triana; David Posada; Tony Rodriguez; Aurelio Valcárcel Carroll
- Starring: Gabriela Spanic; José Ángel Llamas; Catherine Siachoque
- Theme music composer: Carlos Ponce; Joel Someillian
- Opening theme: Carlos Ponce
- Ending theme: Carlos Ponce
- Countries of origin: United States; Colombia
- Original language: Spanish
- No. of episodes: 127

Production
- Executive producer: Hugo León Ferrer
- Producers: Andrés Santamaría; Lucero Venegas
- Production locations: Bogotá, Girardot
- Camera setup: Multi-camera
- Running time: 42–45 minutes

Original release
- Network: Caracol Televisión; Telemundo
- Release: November 4, 2002 – May 16, 2003

La Venganza (The Revenge) is a Spanish-language telenovela produced by the United States–based television network Telemundo, Caracol Televisión and RTI Colombia. This limited-run series ran for 127 episodes from November 4, 2002, to May 16, 2003. The soap opera starred Gabriela Spanic, José Ángel Llamas, and Catherine Siachoque.

== Story ==
Helena Fontana—a sick woman in her forties—who is the daughter of Danilo Fontana, one of the two mob bosses in the Caribbean town of Matamoros is getting married with the heartrob Luis Miguel Ariza. But on her wedding night, she realizes that his new husband has been involved with her sister Grazzia, Helena's heart cannot take this and she dies of sorrow. That very same night, Valentina Diaz, who is just a poor but brave woman and a boxer in illegal fights sponsored by the other mob boss, Fernando Valerugo, also dies because of a huge impact on her head during a fight. At the crossroads of both deaths, Helena mysteriously comes back to life in Valentina's body.

Helena notices this and has to ask help of Tobago Christmas, a medium friend of hers, who helps her to get her life back. Nonetheless, Valentina is still an employee for Fernando Valerugo, so Helena—being in Valentina's body—cannot stop boxing and has to train very hard with Valentina's best friend and trainer Brenda Li just to last toe-to-toe against her opponents in every fight she participates in on behalf of Valerugo.

After earning enough money to sustain herself for a while, Valentina goes to the Fontanas' manor as Helena's best friend and using all her knowledge about the Fontanas' family she easily gets the trust of Luis Miguel and Danilo Fontana. Helena's plan is get even with Grazzia and Luis Miguel but soon she realizes the only responsible is her sister Grazzia, who now sees Valentina as a huge threat for her plans with Luis Miguel Ariza and the Fontana's. Grazzia plans to destroy her own father by helping Fernando Valerugo, so she becomes her lover. While in Fontanas' manor, Helena learns that the daughter she had more than twenty years ago with Fernando Valerugo's son Marco Tulio did not die when she was born, so she decides to find her daughter.

Valentina thinks that a young woman in Valerugo's manor named Adoración is her daughter and Valentina's brother, Paquito, is in love with Adoración. However, the suspicion that Adoración is the heir of both the Fontana and Valerugo families, makes her a target — especially for Fernando's wife, Raquel, and their son Alfredo. Therefore, Raquel kidnaps Adoración in order to control her as the potential heir, ignoring that Adoración is, in fact, the daughter of Sebastián (Fernando's brother), who is famous priest of the town. When Father Sebastián picks up the news that his daughter is in danger, he sets out to release her and, in the process, reconnects with Mariaté, Adoración's mother, after years of being apart.

Grazzia then learns that Raquel was using her to leverage an advantage over Adoración's kidnapping gone wrong, so Grazzia orders Raquel to be killed. Roughly at the same time, Luis Miguel finds out that Fernando's goddaughter, Giovanna, might really be Helena's daughter, effectively falling into Fernando's scheme to confuse the Fontana's, that leads them to falsely believe Giovanna is Helena's daughter.

Later, Valentina and Luis Miguel start a romantic relationship; but Felipe, who is Valentina's ex-boyfriend, actively sabotages their relationship under the pretense of protecting Valentina. Grazzia at the time was expecting Fernando's baby but made Luis Miguel believe it was his to keep him under control. As the grand play of her plan, at a bieg social event of the town Grazzia makes a scene in order to blame Valentina for poisoning her and causing her a miscarriage. After this episode both the Fontana's and the Valerugo's go after Valentina to kill her. But Felipe successfully hides her with the help of Tobago Christmas, making everybody believe she is dead while both prepare her revenge, to get her place back as the sole legitimate heir of both families.

After saving Valentina, Felipe manages to get several top secret documents from both families, which he then compiles into a 'black book' that he uses to blackmail both the Valerugo's and the Fontanas, asking for one million dollars to keep the secret. He gets the money and goes to Europe for quite some time with Valentina and her mother, Concepción — Danilo Fontana's former housekeeper, who knows that Valentina Díaz is, in reality, their daughter: Helena Fontana.

Ignoring all this, Luis Miguel just believes Valentina cheated on him and abandoned him, all while Grazzia convinces Fernando to kill him so she can gain the full rights over the Fontanas' wealth. After her plot, Luis Miguel is left to die in a lake but Valentina gets there in time to save him. Luis Miguel eventually escapes Felipe's lair and Valentina gets caught by Grazzia, who locks her in a basement with no food or water until she finally orders to set the house on fire.

Grazzia then believes that Valentina is dead, but Valentina was taken out of the basement right before the explosion by Tobago's husband and a friend of his. Throughout her torture time in the basement, Helena—in Valentina's body—learns that Luis Miguel married her solely because he wanted to get back several properties that Danilo Fontana took away from his parents. She also finds out that the body she owns now is actually the body of her long-lost daughter with Marco Tulio Valerugo. After surviving all that, Helena now wants to destroy all the people who made her miserable for so long, in spite of the fact she is pregnant with Luis Miguel's baby.

== Cast ==
Actor	Character	Known as
Gabriela Spanic	Valentina Valerugo Fontana	Main heroine, boxer, daughter of Helena and Marco Tulio, in love with Luis Miguel
José Ángel Llamas	Luis Miguel Ariza	Main hero, in love with Helena, then Valentina
Catherine Siachoque	Grazzia Fontana	Main villain, daughter of Danilo, sister of Helena, aunt of Valentina
Jorge Cao	Fernando Valerugo	Father of Marco Tulio and Alfredo, grandfather of Valentina
Maria Elena Doehring	Helena Fontana Viso de Ariza	Daughter of Danilo and Concepcion, sister of Grazzia, mother of Valentina
Orlando Miguel	Felipe Rangel	Brother of Raquel, loves Valentina
Carlos Duplat	Danilo Fontana	Father of Helena and Grazzia, grandfather of Valentina
Margalida Castro	Concepcion Fernandez	Mother of Helena
Nury Flores	Tobago Christmas	Visionary, wife of Jovito
Millie Ruperto	Bernardina Perez "Brenda Lee"	Trainer of Valentina
Marcela Carvajal	Raquel de Valerugo	Wife of Fernando, sister of Felipe
Barbara Garofalo	Mariangel Ariza	Daughter of Luis Miguel and Ximena
Guillermo Galvez	Armando	Best friend of Luis Miguel
Luz Stella Luengas	Yolanda "Yaya" Diaz	Mother of Paquito, stepmother of Valentina
John Ceballos	Rosario Paricua	Bodyguard of Danilo and Helena
Pedro Rendon	Francisco Jose "Paquito" Diaz	Stepbrother of Valentina, in love with Adoracion
Ana Maria Abello	Adoracion Valerugo Dominguez	Daughter of Sebastian and Maria Teresa, in love with Paquito
Naren Daryanani	Alfredo Valerugo	Son of Fernando
Victor Rodriguez	Jovito Matute	Husband of Tobago
Yuri Perez	Franky Garcia	Bodyguard and assistant of Fernando
Julio del Mar	Padre Sebastian	Brother of Fernando, father of Adoracion
Natasha Klauss	Sandra Guzmán	Best friend of Grazzia
Ivette Zamora	María Teresa Carballo	Servant of the Valerugos', mother of Adoracion
Vanessa Simon	Giovanna Alfieri	Girlfriend of Armando
Carlos Barbosa	Numa Pompeyo - Aurelio Santaela	Husband of Yaya
Miguel Alfonso Murillo	Americo Montalva / Father Cumbaya	Visionary
Maria Margarita Giraldo	Matilde	Nurse of Concepcion
Germán Rojas	Leonardo Michelotto	Bodyguard of Danilo
Martha Lucía Pereiro	María Luisa Arciniegas	Lawyer and lover of Luis Miguel
Rosemary Bohórquez	Clara Noyo	Ex-girlfriend of Felipe
Raúl Santa	Teobaldo Carmona	Ex-assistant of Danilo
Laura Suarez	Ximena María Benavides de Ariza	Mother of Mariangel
Sebastian Boscán	Marco Tulio Valerugo	Son of Fernando, Father of Valentina
