= Aguamarina =

- Genre: Telenovela; Drama
- Created by: Leonardo Padrón
- Directed by: José Antonio Ferrara
- Opening theme: "Aguamarina" by José David Díaz
- Country of origin: United States
- Original language: Spanish
- No. of episodes: 126

Production
- Producer: Alfredo Schwarz

Original release
- Network: Telemundo
- Release: 1997 – 1997

Aguamarina, is a 1997 American telenovela produced by Telemundo. Was led by Ruddy Rodríguez and Leonardo García with antagonistic action of Mara Croatto.

== Cast ==
- Ruddy Rodríguez as Marina Luna / Aguamarina
- Leonardo García as Diego Quintana
- Mara Croatto as Verona Calatrava
- Fernando Carrera as Ricardo Calatrava
- Zully Montero as Doña Augusta de Calatrava
- Oswaldo Calvo as Don Julio
- Norma Zuñiga as Renata
- Hans Christopher as Watusi
- Denise Novell as Celeste
- Mario Martin as Silverio
- Griselda Noguera as Germanica
- Eduardo Ibarrola as Schwarzenegger
- Marcela Cardona as Pilar
- Lino Ferrer as Giorgio
- Marisol Calero as Penélope
- Alexandra Navarro as Danielita
- Martha Picanes as Patricia Barbosa
- Cristian de la Osa as Juanito
