= Marisol Calero =

Puerto Rican actress and singer (born 1963)

- Born: Marisol Calero; 13 September 1963 (age 62); Ponce, Puerto Rico
- Known for: Actress and singer
- Awards: Star Actress of the Year at the 19th festival of the Arts Critics Awards for her role in Tal para cual

Marisol Calero (born 13 September 1963) is a Puerto Rican actress and singer.

== Early years ==
Calero was born in Ponce, Puerto Rico, on 13 September 1963. As a child, Calero participated in school performances at the Academia del Perpetuo Socorro and briefly in the San Juan Children's Choir. As a teenager she attended the Escuela Libre de Música (Free School of Music) in San Juan where she continued to participate in the dramatic arts. She studied singing from the age of 14 under the sopranos Rina de Toledo, Vilna Echenique and Darysabel Isales.

== Theatrical career ==
She started her professional career with a fino performance in a poetic musical, accompanied by her mother, the actress and politician Marta Font. She was a singer in various civic, college and professional groups. In time she rose to the theatrical horizon in Puerto Rico.

== Singing career ==
In addition to her theatrical career in Puerto Rico, Calero also became a professional singer. Her first hit was "Conmigo no" ("Not with me") in 1986. This was followed by "Duende", "Ojalá", "Te voy a dejar", "Duendes de la noche" and "Frágil". A parody of "Duendes de la noche" became the comedic character Vitín Alicea's signature song, "Hombres en la noche".

As a singer-songwriter, Calero represented Puerto Rico at the OTI Festival 1987 with her song "Soy mujer". She also performed as an actress in Panama in El diluvio que viene.

== US acting ==
At the beginning of the 1990s, Calero moved to Miami, Florida, where she worked telenovelas as well as theater plays. In 1994, she was named Star Actress of the Year at the 19th festival of the Arts Critics Awards for her role in Tal para cual where she performed with Evelio Taillac.

Later she participated in La duda, directed and produced by Carmen Montejo; Rosita la soltera, a play by Federico García Lorca and Hazme de la noche un cuento by Jorge Márquez, directed by Ramón Pareja for the Latin Theatrical Festival in Miami. Calero was concurrently participating in various TV projects such as Aguamarina, starring Ruddy Rodríguez and Leonardo García, Hey Miami and the telenovela Me muero por ti, also filmed in 2000.

== Puerto Rico acting ==
In 1998, Calero starred in Tal para cual at the San Juan Centro de Bellas Artes. She had a role in the movie Under Suspicion, which was filmed entirely in Puerto Rico. In March 2001, Calero was part of Huracán criollo of the dramatist Juan González-Bonilla.

In 2002, Calero was contracted by the Brazilian company Rede Globo for a role in Vale tudo, playing the role of Mercedes, a Mexican mother bringing up an adolescent daughter. A year later, she starred at the Abanico Theater in Coral Gables, Florida in El último de los amantes, the Spanish version of Neil Simon's The Last of the Red Hot Lovers. She starred in the role of four different characters. Prior to her acting in El último de los amantes, she was recognized by the Office of the Government of Puerto Rico in Miami together with Sully Díaz, Mara Croatto, Yolandita Monge and Adamari López.

In 2018, Calero acted alongside Myraida Chaves, Braulio Castillo Jr., Castillo's brother Jorge Castillo and others in a play named Aqui No Hay Quien Viva!.

== Filmography ==
- Aguamarina (1997) TV (series) as Penelope
- Me muero por tí (1999) (TV series) as Jasmina
- Under Suspicion (2000) as Sergeant Arias
- Bala perdida (2003/II), a.k.a. Stray Bullet
- Ángel rebelde as Etelvina Perez (1 episode, 2004)
- Vale todo (2002) (TV series) as Mercedes
- Una historia común (2004) as Clarita
- Manuela y Manuel (2007) as Norma (a.k.a., "Manuela and Manuel" – USA)
- El Fantasma de Elena (2010) as La Nena Ochoa

== Health issues ==
Calero suffered a cranial aneurysm on 21 August 2020 and was hospitalized at HIMA San Pablo hospital in Caguas.

== Personal ==
Calero was married in 2018 to professional boxing promoter and television sportscaster, the well-known Ivonne Class. The couple divorced in 2021.

Calero currently resides in San Juan, Puerto Rico

== See also ==
- List of Puerto Ricans
