= Marielena Davila =

Venezuelan actress and singer

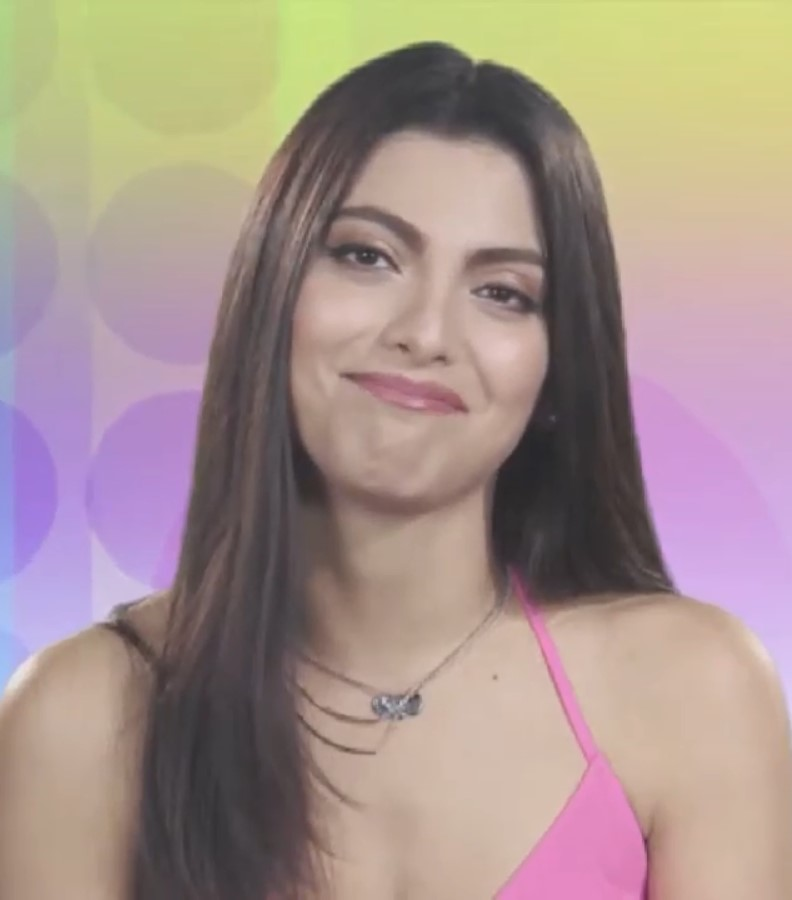
- Davila in 2014
- Born: Maria Elena Dávila Delgado; May 3, 1992 (age 34); Caracas, Venezuela
- Other names: Maria Elena Dávila; Mary Davila-Delgado
- Occupations: Actress, singer
- Years active: 2011–present
- Parent(s): Chiquinquirá Delgado (mother); Guillermo Dávila (father)

Marielena Davila (born May 3, 1992), is a Venezuelan actress and singer from Caracas. She is the daughter of Venezuelan actress Chiquinquirá Delgado and the actor Guillermo Dávila.

== Filmography ==
Film
Year	Title	Role	Notes
2011	The Last Event		Short film
2011	Delusion	The Girl	Short film
2012	Lifeless	Mia	Short film
2015	Audition	Woman / Herself	Documentary

== Telenovelas ==
Year	Title	Role	Notes
2014	En otra piel	Jennifer Andrade	Co-lead role
2014	Voltea pa' que te enamores	María Matilda Ramos Valverde	Lead role
2020	100 días para enamorarnos	Sol	Guest
2021	La suerte de Loli	Jessica	Main cast

== Discography ==
Singles

Title	Year	Album
"Descubriendo el amor"	2014	En otra piel Soundtrack
