= Eternamente tuya =

- Developed by: TV Azteca
- Directed by: Andrés Biermann
- Starring: Fernanda Romero; Andrés Palacios; Marimar Vega; Khotan Fernandez; Verónica Merchant; Mario Zaragoza; Irene Arcilla; Marco Antonio Treviño; Sergio Klainer
- Opening theme: Eternamente tuya by Claudia Sierra
- Country of origin: Mexico
- Original language: Spanish
- No. of episodes: 135

Production
- Executive producers: Pedro Luévano; Martha Pérez Valdez
- Producer: Oscar Guarín

Original release
- Network: Azteca 13
- Release: January 12 – July 17, 2009

Related
- Pobre Rico Pobre; Pobre Diabla

Eternamente tuya (lit. Eternally Yours, international title: Forever Yours) is a Mexican telenovela produced by Oscar Guarín and Azteca, starring Fernanda Romero, Khotan Fernandez, Andrés Palacios, and Verónica Merchant.

== Cast ==
- Fernanda Romero as Antonia
- Marimar Vega as Sara
- Khotan Fernandez as David
- Andrés Palacios as Juan Pablo
- Veronica Merchant as Águeda
- Irene Arcila as Guadalupe
- Marco Antonio Treviño as Jesús
- Rodolfo Arias as Humberto
- Sergio Kleiner as Chon
- Mario Zaragoza as Ramón
- Juan Pablo Medina
- Ana Belena
- Fernando Becerril
- Fernando Alonso as Roberto
- Carmen Madrid as Ernestina
- Emilio Guerrero as Crispín
- Andrea Escalona as Forencia
- Luis Alberto López as Tiburcio
- Juan David Penágos
- Joanydka Mariel
- Flavio Peniche
- Alfredo Herrera
- Fidel Garriga as Mateo
- Rafael Rojas
