= Rodrigo de la Rosa =

Mexican actor (born 1977)

Rodrigo de la Rosa (born August 30, 1977) is a Mexican actor, best known for appearing in several telenovelas. He starred in three successful Mexican telenovas, Daniela 2002, El Alma Herida 2003, and La Ley del Silencio 2005, although he has appeared in musicals such as "Man of La Mancha" (1999), "Jesus Christ Superstar" (2000) and "Les Miserables" (2002-2003) playing the role of "Marius".

He also appeared in an episode of Inspector Mom, and in the 2007 American straight to DVD film Walking Tall: Lone Justice opposite Kevin Sorbo. Also in 2007, he hosted the Mexican talk-show Sin tapujos. In 2010, he starred in the new version of the novela "Perro Amor" and in 2011 in novela "Alguien te mira" as Pedro Pablo Peñafiel. In 2012, he starred ``El Rostro de la Venganza´´ as a prisoner called Leyton alongside David Chocarro, Marlene Favela and Saul Lisazo.
