= Mara Croatto =

Puerto Rican actress

- Born: Mara Croatto; February 2, 1969 (age 57); Caracas, Venezuela
- Spouse(s): Juan Roselló (Married: ??; Divorced: ??); José Ángel Llamas (Married: 2004 - Present)
- Children: 3

Mara Croatto (born February 2, 1969) is a retired Venezuelan-born Puerto Rican actress.

== Early years ==
Croatto is the daughter of Argentine actress Raquel Montero and Puerto Rican (Italian Argentine born) folk singer Tony Croatto. Shortly after her birth in Caracas, Venezuela, her parents decided to move and resettle in Puerto Rico.

She was raised and educated in San Juan. When Croatto was 11 years old, she attended the D'Rose Modeling School, where she took modeling classes. She was an alumna of the Academia del Perpetuo Socorro in Miramar. Croatto has always considered herself a Puerto Rican and publicly identifies herself as such.

== Acting career ==
Croatto started her acting career as a narrator in El Show de Shows ("The Show of Shows") which aired locally on Channel 11. She also worked as a dancer on such television shows Juventud 83 and Juventud 84 during her adolescence.

During her early adulthood, she won a small part in the television show La Pension de Doña Tere (Mrs. Tere Boardinghouse) starring Norma Candal. That year, she also worked in her first mini soap opera in which members of Menudo participated. She played the sister of Ricky Martin's character who happened to be in love with Robby Rosa.

Her first important role in a soap opera was in Cisne Blanco (White Swan) with Deborah Carthy-Deu. Among the other soap operas in which she participated are:

- María María (1989), Julia
- Pobre diabla (1990)
- Marielena (1992), Graciela (Special performance)
- Guadalupe (1993-1994), Diana Zambrano
- Morelia (1995), Sarah (Special performance)
- Aguamarina (1997), Verona Calatrava
- La Mujer de Mi Vida (1998), Katiuska Cardona
- Me muero por ti (1999), Helena
- Gata Salvaje (2002-2003), Eduarda Arismendi - antagonist
- Amor descarado (2003), Chantal
- La ley del silencio (2005), Isabel
- Valeria (2008), Estrella Granados

== Personal ==
Croatto was married to Juan Roselló, the brother of Roy Rosselló, a former Menudo member. She and Roselló have two sons together, Juan Alejandro and Michael Gabriel. On August 29, 2004, Croatto married Mexican actor José Ángel Llamas. They have one son together, Rafael.

In February 2011, Croatto and Llamas became born-again Christians, and they have since quit acting to focus on their service to God.

== See also ==
- List of Puerto Ricans
