= Ana Lucía Domínguez =

Colombian actress

Ana Lucía Domíngez
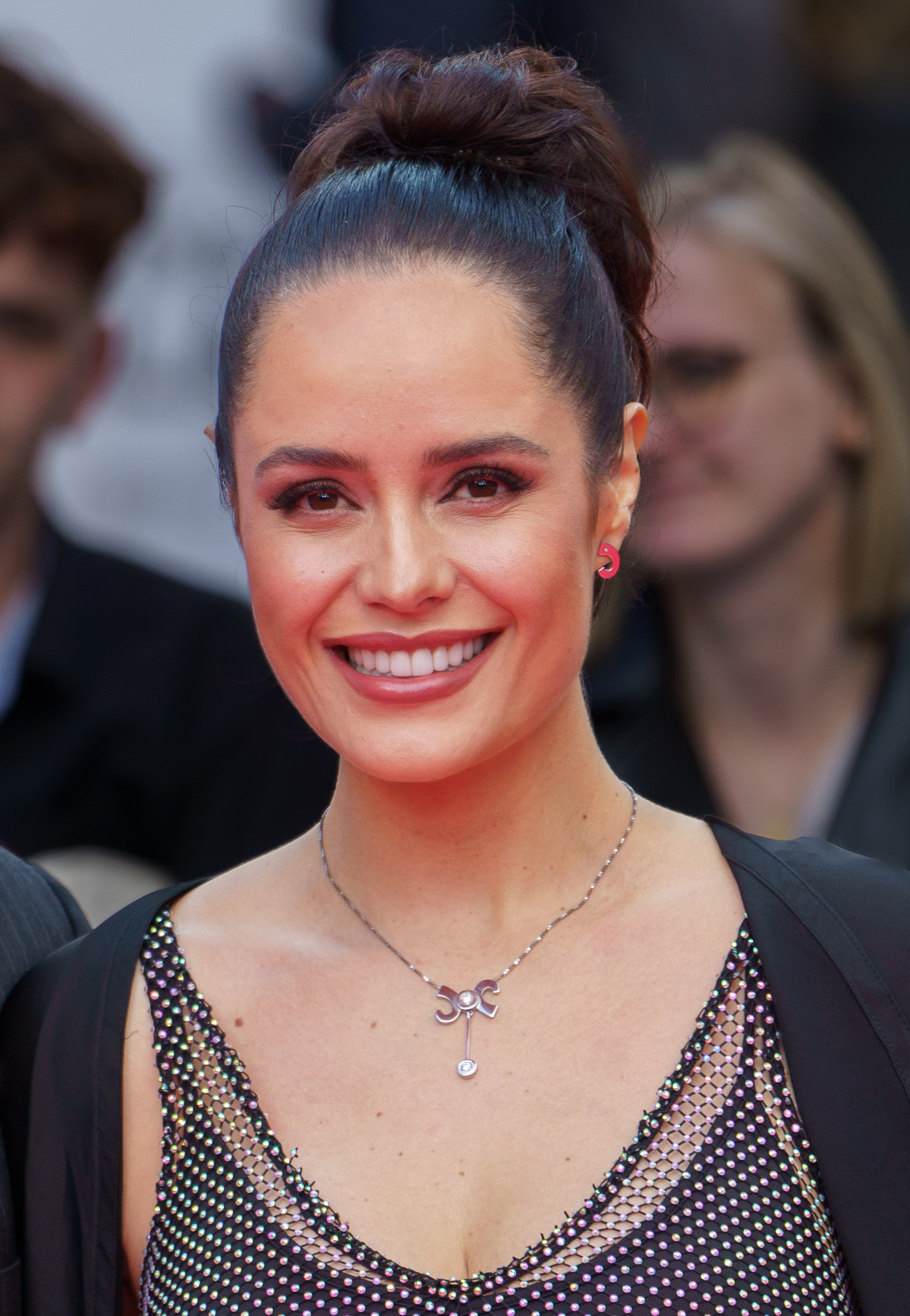
- Domínguez in 2025
- Born: Ana Lucía Domíngez Tobón; December 2, 1983 (age 42); Bogotá, Colombia
- Occupations: Actress; Model
- Years active: 1993–present
- Height: 1.65 m (5 ft 5 in)
- Spouses: David Alberto García (m. 2001; div. 2003) Jorge Cárdenas (m. 2008)

Ana Lucía Domínguez Tobón (born December 2, 1983) is a Colombian actress and model.

== Biography ==
Ana Lucía Domínguez Tobón was born on December 2, 1983, in Bogotá, Colombia. In her home country, she studied acting, speech, and body language.

== Career ==
As a child, Domínguez developed an interest in acting. She saw Margarita Rosa de Francisco playing the part of Gaviota in Cafe con aroma de mujer (Coffee with the smell of a woman) and she wanted to be like her, a multitalented artist who, in addition to acting, also sings and performed as an announcer on television. She began recording commercials for television at nine years of age. Her first television appearance was on the soap opera Padres e hijos (Fathers and sons). Much later, she appeared in De pies a cabeza (From feet to head) and Conjunto Cerrado (Closed Set). Hermosa Niña (Beautiful Girl) was the first series in which she played the leading role. It was at this stage of her life that she decided to focus on acting.

Later, she achieved success as the presenter in Los angeles de la Mega (The Angels of the Mega). Her international debut in telenovelas (soap operas) was in Gata Salvaje (Wild cat), but it was after her part in the telenovela Pasion de Gavilanes (Passion of the Sparrowhawks) that she became internationally established. Her fame grew throughout all of Latin America and Spain, even appearing in the nude on the cover of the well known magazine Interviu (Interview), and the Colombian magazine SoHo on two occasions.

In 2009, she was hired by Telemundo to star in the soap opera Perro Amor (Puppy Love), along with Puerto Rican actor Carlos Ponce and Colombian actress Maritza Rodríguez, for which she moved to Miami; in this same production she was given the opportunity to sing a pair of songs. In the same year, she participated in the Colombian series El Fantasma del Gran Hotel (The Ghost of the Great Hotel). She played the role of Martina in the soap opera La Traicionera (The Treacherous One) on the RCN channel, together with her husband Jorge Cardenas.

== Personal life ==
In 2001, at the age of 18, Domínguez married comedian David Alberto García, who was 14 years older than her, after five years of courtship. The couple divorced two years later.

In 2008, she married Colombian singer and actor Jorge Cárdenas.

== Filmography ==
=== Television ===
Television roles
Year	Title	Role	Notes
1993	De pies a cabeza	Yadira Chacón	
1996	Conjunto cerrado	Manuela	
1998	Hermosa niña	Antonia Donoso	
1999	El fiscal	Fancisca "Frica" Lombana	
2000	Amor Discos	Miryam Isabel Dominguín	
2000	Se armó la gorda	Jackeline Monsalve	
2001	El informante en el país de las mercancías	Cecilia de Castro	
2002–2003	Gata Salvaje	Adriana Linares	
2003–2004	Pasión de Gavilanes	Libia Reyes Guerrero \ Ruth Uribe Santos / Ruth Guerrero Rodríguez	
2004	Te voy a enseñar a querer	Camila Buenrostro	
2005	Decisiones	Alicia	Episode: "La profesora de química"
2006	El engaño	Marcela García / Camila Navarro	
2006	Amores cruzados	María Márquez García	
2007	Madre Luna	Anabel Saldaña	
2007–2008	Mujeres asesinas	Unknown role	2 episodes
2009	El fantasma del Gran Hotel	Irene Buenaventura	
2010	Perro amor	Sofía Santana	
2011–2012	La Traicionera	Martina Figueroa	267 episodes
2013	Las Bandidas	Fabiola Montoya	
2014	Misterio's	Mayra	Episode: "Llamas de sueño"
2015–2019	Señora Acero	Marta Mónica Villalobos “La Tuti”	Recurring role (season 2); main role (seasons 3–5); 134 episodes
2018	Nicky Jam: El Ganador	Rosa	
2021	Who Killed Sara?	Sofía	Recurring role
2022–present	Pálpito	Camila Duarte	14 episodes

== Awards and nominations ==
=== Premios India Catalina ===
Year	Category	Nominated work	Results
2000	Best Actress in a Telenovela/Series	El fiscal	Nominated

=== Premios TV y Novelas ===
Year	Category	Nominated work	Results
2000	Best Actress in a Telenovela/Series	El fiscal	Nominated

=== Premio Mara de Oro Venezuela ===
Year	Category	Nominated work	Results
2003	Best Foreign Actress	Pasión de Gavilanes	Won
