= Rosalinda Rodríguez =

Mexican stage and TV actress

Rosalinda Rodríguez is a Mexican stage, television and film actress known for her work in telenovelas for Telemundo and Venevision, her many stage performances, and her award-winning performance in the short film Interview with Marilyn.

== Early life ==
Rodríguez was born on September 18, 1970, in Tampico, Tamaulipas, Mexico, during Hurricane Beulah.

Her parents are José Rodríguez Cantú and Concepción Cienfuegos de Rodriguez, and she has two sisters and a brother.

She has a bachelor's degree in marketing from the Tecnológico de Monterrey.

== Career ==
Rodríguez began her career as a journalist in 1989 on the newscast Info 7. In 1994 she was promoted to the TV Azteca weather segments.

Meanwhile, she began her stage career with productions like Yerma by Federico García Lorca, Lissistrata by Aristófanes, Our Town by Thornton Wilder, El Marasmo by Hernán Galindo, and Diálogo entre el Amor y un viejo by Rodrigo de Cota.

In 1998, she moved to Miami, Florida, United States, to pursue a career in television and film. She was cast in several soap operas on Telemundo, turning a supporting character like Cantalicia Muñetón into a leading character, which increased her popularity and fan following, as well as award recognitions such as Best Actress, Best Supporting Actress, and Audience's Favorite Actress.

During another hurricane, she met her husband, Kenneth Jenkins, and they welcomed their first child, Kevin José Jenkins, in 2002.

Her career continued with more roles on stage, such as Seis personajes en busca de Autor by Luigi Pirandello, A dos cincuenta la Cuba libre by Ibrahim Guerra, El sueño Americano by Eduardo Pardo, Bodas de Sangre by Federico García Lorca, A Streetcar Named Desire by Tennessee Williams, El Principio de Arquímedes by Joseph María Miró and Mujeres ligeras by Indira Páez, with whom she also worked on the play Mujeres de par en par.

She gained recognition for portraying Doña Rosa Saavedra de Rivera, the mother of the Latin singer Jenni Rivera, in the Telemundo biopic Jenni Rivera: Mariposa de Barrio. In 2019, she received several awards and critics' recognition for her performance in the short film Interview with Marilyn, directed by Agatino Zurría, which earned her the Best Actress award on June 9 at the Independent Short Awards, as well as the 2020 Action on Film International Festival in Las Vegas, Nevada. The Lonely Wolf Film Festival praised her work, stating that "Rosalinda Rodriguez's infectiously charming performance, where she pushes past her Marilyn Monroe facade into her unique quirks and personal magnetism", while the website Short Films Matter stated that "Rosalinda Rodriguez carries the film throughout – her bilingual portrayal of the Latino immigrant actress deserves applause and provides for entertaining viewing."

In 2023, Rodríguez continued her stage work with the production Frida Mía, which she created and performed in New York, Chicago, Monterrey, Bogotá, Cali, and several locations in Florida. In 2024, she was cast in the stage play Papier Maché by Carlos Celdrán, which sold out in Spain.

Year	Production	Producer	Character
2024	La mujer de mi vida	Telemundo	Sharon Gonzalez
2021	Housegirl	Short film	Belen's mother
2019	Interview with Marilyn	AZCAfilms	Marilyn Moreno
2017	Jenni Rivera: Mariposa de Barrio	Telemundo	Doña Rosa Saavedra de Rivera
2015	Bajo el mismo cielo	Telemundo	Laura Morales
2014	Reina de corazones	Telemundo	Carmen Solís
2013	Dama y obrero	Telemundo	Petra García
2011-2012	La casa de al lado	Telemundo	Karen Ortega
2010	Aurora	Telemundo	Pilar
2010	Perro amor	Telemundo	Doña Beatriz Vda. de Caparrozo
2009	Valeria	Venevisión	Hilda de Hidalgo
2007	Dame Chocolate	Telemundo	Hortensia Barraza Amado
2006-2007	Las dos caras de Ana	Canal de Las Estrellas	Úrsula Peralta
2005	El Cuerpo del Deseo	Telemundo	Cantalicia Muñetón de Cerinza
2004 - 2005	Anita no te rajes	Telemundo	Rosario Chayo Guerrero
2004	Prisionera	Telemundo	Wendy "Tarántula" Saladio
2000	La revancha	Venevision	Tula Peña
