= Amantes del desierto =

2002 television series

- Genre: Romance - Action, Drama
- Based on: Amanted del desierto by Julio Jimenez
- Developed by: Telemundo; RTI Colombia; Caracol Television
- Written by: Kiko Olivieri, Andrea López Jaramillo, José Fernando Pérez, Claudia García Giraldo
- Starring: Maritza Rodríguez; Francisco Gattorno; Catherine Siachoque
- Theme music composer: Miguel de Narváez
- Opening theme: 'Dos Corazones, Dos Historias' performed by Julio Iglesias; Alejandro Fernández
- Ending theme: 'Dos Corazones, Dos Historias' performed by Julio Iglesias; Alejandro Fernández
- Countries of origin: United States; Colombia
- Original language: Spanish
- No. of episodes: 121

Production
- Executive producers: Arnaldo Limansky; Hugo León Ferrer
- Producers: Andrés Santamaría; Lucero Venegas
- Camera setup: Multi-camera
- Running time: 42-45 minutes

Original release
- Network: Telemundo; Caracol Televisión
- Release: March 19 – September 4, 2001

Amantes del Desierto (Desert Lovers) is a Spanish-language telenovela produced by the United States–based television network Telemundo, RTI Colombia and Caracol Television. This limited-run series ran for 121 episodes from March 19, 2001, to September 4, 2001.

== Plot ==
A man and a woman who love each other have to confront the world in order to defend their feelings. Andrés Bustamante has been sentenced to twelve years in the gloomy cliff jail. Colonel Miguel Santana's daughter Barbara helps him escape from jail and takes him to the arid desert to hide. They are chased by Miguel Santana who makes them go through many dangerous adventures in search for freedom.

Desert Lovers is a passionate and adventurous love story that takes place between the 1950s and 1960s. It stars Andrés Bustamante as a young, modest doctor, and Bárbara Santana as a woman who was born in a time when very conservative ideas ruled society.

== Cast ==
=== Main cast ===
Actor	Character	Known as
Maritza Rodríguez	Bárbara Santana	Main heroine, stepdaughter of Miguel & Esther & Camila real sister. Wife of Andres. Andrea Bustamante Santana’s mother.
Francisco Gattorno	Andres Bustamante	Main hero, husband of Barbara. Andrea Bustamante Santana’s father.
Catherine Siachoque	Micaela Fernández / Manuela Olivares	Main villain, Alias, ex-housekeeper, ex-wife of Miguel, later killed by Miguel Santana.
Roberto Escobar	Miguel Santana	Colonel of prison "Faralion", stepfather of Bárbara
Ana Soler	Esther de Santana	Ex-wife of Miguel, Bárbara's mother, is killed by Micaela
Edgardo Román	Idelfonso Cubillos	Leutenante in prison "Faralion", villain, gets killed by prisoners
Juan Pablo Shuk	Bruno Salegui	Lover of Micaela, villain, is killed by Micaela
Rolando Tarajano	Santos Libardo / Satanás	prisoner of Cliff jail, brother of Andres
Helios Fernández	Padre Morán	Priest of the Farallon prison
Carlos Barbosa	Francisco de Paula "Pancho" Fonseca	Husband of Bertha
Maria Cristina Gálvez	Bertha de Fonseca	Wife of Pacho
Ricardo González	Tomás "Tomasito" Fonseca	Son of Pacho and Bertha
Agmeth Escaf	Javier Negrete	son of Rafael Negrete, Bárbara's 2nd boyfriend
Víctor Cifuentes	Abelardo Mejía	Leutenante in prison "Faralion", Griselda's husband
Ivette Zamora	Griselda	Bárbara's maid and friend
Margálida Castro	Magdalena Libardo ‘Tania’	mother of Santos
Roberto Mateos	Alejandro García	Barbara's doctor, in love with her
Andrea López	Camila Santana	Agustín's daughter, Bárbara's real sister
Santiago Bejarano	Agustín Santana	brother of Miguel, real father of Bárbara
Roxana Montoya	Andrea Bustamante Santana	daughter of Andres and Bárbara
Leonor Arango	Elena Bustamante	mother of Andres, gets killed at the operation by Cubillos
Raúl Gutiérrez	Sergio Góngora	Rafael's real killer, Javier's lawyer, villain
Patricia Tamayo	Isabel	in love with Javier
Maria Luisa Rey	Maria Gracia	in love with Santos
Alexander Paez	Piraña	"prisoner of "Faralion", friend of Andres, gets killed at the operation by Cubillos
Lucy Martínez	Nemesia	Barbara's helper witch
Carolina González	Filomena	lover of Tomasito
Carlos Hurtado	Toño	owner of the bar in the village Esmeralda
Liliana González	Josefina	wife of Toño, in love with Javier
Sandra Pérez	Trinidad	member of Bruno's gang, gets killed by Cubillos
Alberto León Jaramillo	Jalil	owner of the moving circus
Júlio del Mar	Aurelio León	General of Cliff jail
Fernando Corredor	Guillermo Muñoz	Procuror, Sergio's accomplice, villain, gets killed by Micaela
German Rojas	Damian Fabre	Painter
Martha Suárez	Jamaica	Micaela's maid and her accomplice, witch
Guilied López	Lucía	Blind, in love with Luis Felipe, Idelfonso's love interes
Orlando Pardo	Luis Felipe	Doctor, in love with Lucía, friend of Alejandro
Xiomara Segura	Barbie	Santos' girlfriend, gets killed by Cubillos
Paola Díaz	Sabrina Montenegro	workwoman of Khalil, Tomasito's lover
Vilma Vera	Gertrudis	sister in chapel
Julio Echeverri	Inspector	Agustín's friend
Luís Fernando Ardilla	Pinocho	
Julio Cesar Pachón	Tijeres	"prisoner of "Faralion", friend of Santos
Néstor Alfonso Rojas	El Pulgarcito	in love with Filomena, workman of Fonseca's mine
Olga Cecilia Mendoza	Rita	
Jose Cardeño	Joaquín	
Claudia Rocio Mora	Nelly	Micaela's accomplice nurse
Carlos Zerrato	El Ratón	prisoner of Cliff jail, Lucia's brother
Alejandro Tamayo		a driver, gets killed by Micaela

== International broadcasting ==
Country	Alternate title/Translation	TV network(s)	Series premiere	Series finale	Weekly schedule	Timeslot
Azerbaijan	Səhrada Məhəbbət	ANS TV	2002	2002	Monday to Friday	19:00
Bulgaria	Любов в пустинята	bTV	2001	2002	Monday to Friday	11:00
Georgia	სიყვარული უდაბნოში	Imedi Media Holding	2003	2004	Monday to Friday	18:00
Serbia	Pustinjski ljubavnici	TV Košava	2002	2002	Monday to Friday	19:00
Bosnia and Herzegovina	Pustinjski ljubavnici	RTV USK	2003	2004	Monday to Friday	19:00
Morocco	الحب في الصحراء	2M TV	2003	2004	Saturday to Wednesday	18:00
Somaliland	Jacaylkii Lama-degaanka	Horn Cable Television	2008	2009	Saturday to Wednesday	19:00
