= Villamaría, Caldas =

- Municipality and town
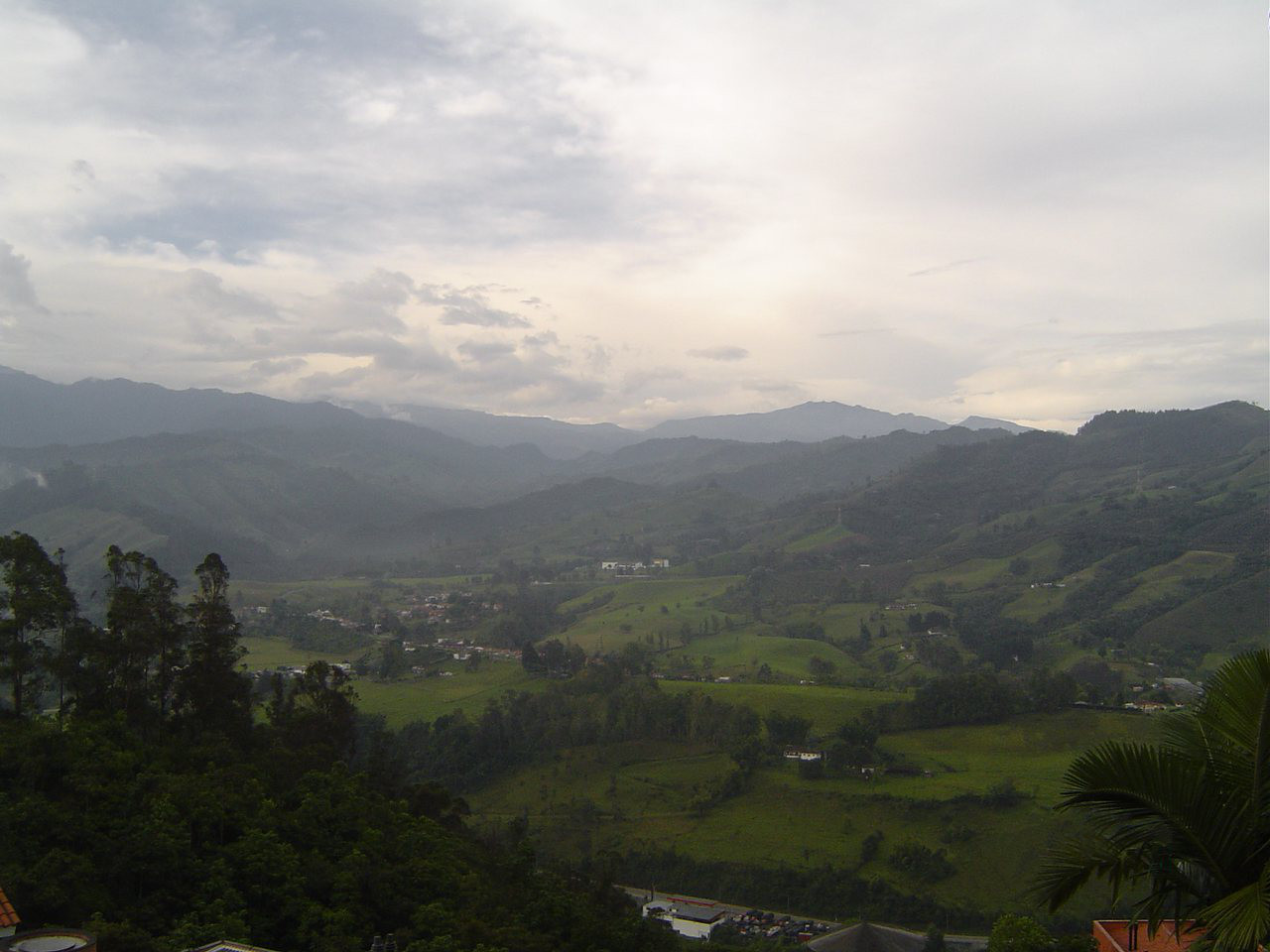

- Flag Coat of arms

- Location of the municipality and town of Villamaría, Caldas in the Caldas Department of Colombia.

- Location in Colombia
- Coordinates: 5°05′52″N 75°30′56″W
- Country: Colombia
- Department: Caldas Department
- Founded: October 19, 1852

Government
  - Mayor: Juan Alejandro Holguin

Area
  - Municipality and town: 455.1 km^{2} (175.7 sq mi)
  - Urban: 4.83 km^{2} (1.86 sq mi)
- Elevation: 1,920 m (6,300 ft)

Population (2018 census)
  - Municipality and town: 64,652
  - Density: 142.1/km^{2} (367.9/sq mi)
  - Urban: 55,894
  - Urban density: 11,600/km^{2} (30,000/sq mi)
- Demonym: Villamariano
- Time zone: UTC-5 (Colombia Standard Time)
- Area code: 57 + 6
- Website: Official website (in Spanish)

Villamaría is a town and municipality in the Colombian Department of Caldas. Located in the Colombian coffee growing axis, it was made part of the "Coffee Cultural Landscape" UNESCO World Heritage Site in 2011.

== Climate ==
The city of Villamaría and the lower parts of the municipality have a subtropical highland climate (Köppen Cfb).

Climate data for Villamaría
Month	Jan	Feb	Mar	Apr	May	Jun	Jul	Aug	Sep	Oct	Nov	Dec	Year
Mean daily maximum °C (°F)	22.8 (73.0)	22.8 (73.0)	22.7 (72.9)	22.0 (71.6)	22.0 (71.6)	21.8 (71.2)	22.7 (72.9)	22.5 (72.5)	22.1 (71.8)	21.3 (70.3)	21.4 (70.5)	22.0 (71.6)	22.2 (71.9)
Daily mean °C (°F)	17.7 (63.9)	17.8 (64.0)	18.1 (64.6)	17.7 (63.9)	17.9 (64.2)	17.5 (63.5)	17.8 (64.0)	17.8 (64.0)	17.4 (63.3)	17.0 (62.6)	17.0 (62.6)	17.3 (63.1)	17.6 (63.6)
Mean daily minimum °C (°F)	12.6 (54.7)	12.9 (55.2)	13.5 (56.3)	13.4 (56.1)	13.8 (56.8)	13.3 (55.9)	12.9 (55.2)	13.1 (55.6)	12.8 (55.0)	12.8 (55.0)	12.7 (54.9)	12.7 (54.9)	13.0 (55.5)
Average rainfall mm (inches)	110.4 (4.35)	116.5 (4.59)	160.5 (6.32)	213.9 (8.42)	224.8 (8.85)	154.1 (6.07)	98.3 (3.87)	95.5 (3.76)	159.1 (6.26)	249.8 (9.83)	232.8 (9.17)	138.5 (5.45)	1,954.2 (76.94)
Average rainy days (≥ 1 mm)	11	12	16	20	20	17	12	11	16	20	19	12	186
Source 1:
Source 2:

While the higher parts of the municipality have an alpine tundra climate (ETH) and the highest part has an ice cap climate (EFH).

Climate data for Las Brisas
Month	Jan	Feb	Mar	Apr	May	Jun	Jul	Aug	Sep	Oct	Nov	Dec	Year
Mean daily maximum °C (°F)	8.6 (47.5)	8.5 (47.3)	8.7 (47.7)	8.5 (47.3)	8.5 (47.3)	8.7 (47.7)	8.6 (47.5)	8.6 (47.5)	8.3 (46.9)	7.7 (45.9)	8.0 (46.4)	8.4 (47.1)	8.4 (47.2)
Daily mean °C (°F)	4.4 (39.9)	4.6 (40.3)	4.8 (40.6)	5.0 (41.0)	5.1 (41.2)	4.9 (40.8)	4.5 (40.1)	4.5 (40.1)	4.4 (39.9)	4.4 (39.9)	4.4 (39.9)	4.5 (40.1)	4.6 (40.3)
Mean daily minimum °C (°F)	0.8 (33.4)	1.0 (33.8)	1.2 (34.2)	1.8 (35.2)	1.9 (35.4)	1.5 (34.7)	0.9 (33.6)	0.9 (33.6)	1.0 (33.8)	1.3 (34.3)	1.5 (34.7)	1.0 (33.8)	1.2 (34.2)
Average rainfall mm (inches)	85.7 (3.37)	83.3 (3.28)	116.7 (4.59)	178.0 (7.01)	189.3 (7.45)	112.3 (4.42)	70.7 (2.78)	73.2 (2.88)	114.7 (4.52)	192.2 (7.57)	145.7 (5.74)	86.7 (3.41)	1,448.5 (57.02)
Average rainy days	14.3	15.7	19.9	23.1	23.3	20.7	17.9	17.5	18.9	24.7	22.8	17.8	236.6
Average relative humidity (%)	89.3	91.7	91.8	93.6	93.4	92.2	90.5	91.2	91.8	92.7	92.2	90.5	91.7
Mean monthly sunshine hours	97.6	85.1	71.9	46.0	53.7	72.6	102.6	98.4	62.4	44.8	62.4	82.8	880.3
Mean daily sunshine hours	3.1	3.0	2.3	1.5	1.7	2.4	3.3	3.2	2.1	1.4	2.1	2.7	2.4
