= Expecting a Miracle =

2009 television film

- Based on: "The Miracle of Dommatina" by Ira Avery
- Screenplay by: Donald Davenport
- Directed by: Steve Gomer
- Starring: Jason Priestley; Teri Polo; Cheech Marin
- Theme music composer: Kevin Kiner
- Original language: English

Production
- Producers: Douglas W. Dean; Jeff Kloss; Larry Levinson; Michael Moran; Randy Pope; Tony Roman
- Cinematography: Maximo Munzi
- Editor: Jennifer Jean Cacavas

Original release
- Network: Hallmark Channel
- Release: January 10, 2009

Expecting a Miracle is a Hallmark Channel original movie that premiered Saturday, January 10, 2009. The movie stars Jason Priestley, Teri Polo, and Cheech Marin. It is directed by Steve Gomer, and is based on the short story "The Miracle of Dommatina" by Ira Avery.

== Plot ==
Pete and Donna Stanhope are a young married couple living in L.A. who are trying to conceive a child. When they discover they are unable to have children due to medical issues, their marriage begins to crumble. They decide to go on vacation and wind up stranded in a small village in Mexico due to car troubles. They meet the charming young boy Pepillo, who was crippled in an accident years before that also killed his parents; Pepillo's adult brother Juan, the village mechanic; Magdalena, Juan's fiancé, who also takes care of the village children; and Father Arturo, the village priest who is helping prepare the "flying machine" for the upcoming fiesta.

Juan tries to fix the car, but the parts he must order are slow to arrive. In the meantime, Pete helps Father Arturo prepare for the annual fiesta, which is to occur in just a few days' time. The main event of the fiesta involves a rickety old lever and pulley system wherein one lucky village child can "fly" around the plaza square. The source of the tradition dates to the village's local saint, who was said to have come to Dommatina many years ago and have been befriended by a young crippled boy when no one else would speak to him. As thanks for his kindness, the saint turned the boy into a dove, who flew around the plaza square three times, and then turned him back into a boy. Upon resuming human form the boy was miraculously cured. It is Pepillo's turn this year to fly, and he confides in Pete his belief that the saint will also cure him after his flight.

Trouble ensues when the flying machine breaks just two days before the event. Pete comes through with his engineering skills and builds a new safer machine. He even sacrifices the car part that had finally arrived so that a crucial central axis part will work. Pepillo gets his chance to fly. Pete and Donna worry about how disappointed Pepillo will be when he is not cured after his flight, and they agree to use their fertility treatment money to pay for a doctor and surgery for Pepillo instead.

However, during the flight Pepillo urges Father Arturo and a local villager to make the flying machine go faster and higher, straining it beyond its capabilities. Pepillo crashes to the ground and hits his hip on the statue of the saint. When he comes to, his leg is miraculously cured. Pete and Donna vow that they have just witnessed a miracle—and promise to still bring Pepillo to the U.S. to "make sure his miracle stays a miracle." Upon returning home, Pete and Donna have decided to adopt a child and are filling out paperwork. Although initially Pete did not think that he could love another child as his own, knowing Pepillo has changed him. However, Donna experiences heartburn and takes one last pregnancy test and finds out that against all odds she is pregnant.

== Cast ==
- Jason Priestley as Pete Stanhope
- Teri Polo as Donna Stanhope
- Shalim Ortiz as Juan
- Rebeka Montoya as Magdalena
- Cheech Marin as Father Arturo
- Kevin Hernandez as Pepillo

== Reception ==
Expecting a Miracle ranked as the #1 cable program of the night, #1 cable movie of the week, and boosted Hallmark Channel to rank #1 in Prime Time for the day. The movie scored a 2.8 household rating with 2.4 million homes, over 3 million total viewers and more than 4.2 million unduplicated viewers.

Star magazine gave the film one and a half stars, calling it "a goopy feel-good movie," and saying "it's enough to take your mind off how terrible an actor Priestley really is."
