= José Ángel Llamas =

Mexican actor (born 1966)

- Born: José Ángel Llamas Olmo; 13 October 1966 (age 59); Mexico City, Mexico
- Occupation: Actor
- Years active: 1996–2010 (as actor); 2011-Present (as pastor)
- Spouse(s): Gaby Cuandón (m. ??; div. 20??) Mara Croatto (m. 2004)
- Children: 3
- Family: María Eugenia Llamas (half-sister)

José Ángel Llamas Olmos (born 13 October 1966) is a Mexican retired actor in telenovelas, perhaps best known for his dual role as Pelluco and Rodolfo in Amor descarado.

His striking good looks made him a heartthrob among his many fans. In February 2011, Llamas and his wife, Mara Croatto, became born-again Christians, when he choose to "turn away from the gods of fame, money and power", quit acting, and focus on serving God. His last role was the lead character of José Luis Bermúdez in the telenovela Prófugas del destino.

Llamas was married to Gaby Cuandón, and they had one son together, Rafael. He married Mara Croatto on August 29, 2004, and they have one son together, Juan Alejandro, and he is step father to her son, Michel Gabriel, from her marriage to Juan "King" Roselló. Llamas is the half-brother of the actress María Eugenia Llamas and author María Victoria Llamas.

== Filmography ==
List of appearances in television series, and films
| Year | Title | Role | Notes |
|---|---|---|---|
| 1996 | Nada personal | Luis Mario Gómez | |
| 1998 | Demasiado corazón | Luis Mario Gómez | |
| 1998 | Amor infiel | Daniel Suárez | |
| 1999 | Háblame de amor | Raúl Antonio Xicoténcatl | |
| 2001 | Cara o cruz | Ismael Serrano | |
| 2002 | Protagonistas de Novela | Host | Episode: "Casting" |
| 2002 | La venganza | Luis Miguel Ariza | |
| 2003 | Amor Descarado | Pedro "Pelluco" Solís / Rodolfo Fuentemayor | |
| 2005 | La ley del silencio | Javier Castro | |
| 2005 | Corazón partido | Adrián Rincón / Santiago Rincón | |
| 2006 | Lotería | Ricardo | Episode: "Ricardo Cuevas único ganador" |
| 2008 | Vivir por ti | Emiliano Marín | |
| 2008 | Amor comprado | Guillermo "Willy" Cantú / Ramiro Cantú | |
| 2009 | Mujer comprada | Miguel Ángel Diaz | |
| 2009 | Alma indomable | Juan Pablo Robles | |
| 2010 | Prófugas del destino | José Luis Bermúdez | |
