= Jullye Giliberti =

Venezuelan actress (born 1976)

- Born: Jullye Katherine Giliberti Cevedo; April 23, 1976 (age 50); Valencia, Venezuela
- Occupation: Actress
- Website: Official Website

Jullye Katherine Giliberti Cevedo (born April 23, 1976 in Valencia, Venezuela) is a Venezuelan actress best known for her roles in telenovelas. She has appeared in several series, including La ley del silencio, Amores de mercado and Prisionera. She played the lovesick Julia Arismendi in Telemundo's Dame Chocolate.

Giliberti was signed to play one of the four title roles in Telemundo's Las Brujas de South Beach in 2007, however, the show was never produced.

== Filmography ==
Telenovelas
Year	Production	Role	Ref.
2018	On the Other Side of the Wall	Lorena Agudelo	
2013	11-11: In My Block Nothing Blocks	Susana Jiménez	
2011	Love again	Rosilda	
2009	If your eyes look at me	Samantha Salaverry	
2007	Sweet Secret	Julia Arismendi	
2006	Love at the Market	Cristina Moreno	
2005	The Code of Silence	Magdalena Aguirre	
2005	Decisions	Nina	
2004	Prisoner	Ignacia 'Nacha' Vergara	

== Personal life ==
Gilliberti is married to Mexican journalist Fernando del Rincón. They began dating in 2007 and married in April 2014. They live in Miami, Florida with their two dogs.
