= Prisionera =

- Created by: Humberto Kico Olivieri
- Developed by: Telemundo Studios Miami
- Written by: Humberto 'Kico' Olivieri, Isamar Hernandez, Luis Colmenares, Carolina Diaz
- Directed by: Leonardo Aranguibel; Luis Barrios
- Starring: Gabriela Spanic; Mauricio Islas; Gabriel Porras
- Theme music composer: Rudy Pérez
- Opening theme: Prisionera by Pilar Montenegro
- Country of origin: United States
- Original language: Spanish
- No. of episodes: 180

Production
- Executive producer: Aurelio Valcárcel Carrol
- Producer: José Vicente Scheuren
- Production locations: Miami, Florida, USA
- Cinematography: Juan Pablo Puentes; Ignacio González
- Editors: Sebastián Jiménez; Macorix Perera
- Running time: 45-50 minutes

Original release
- Network: Telemundo Caracol Televisión
- Release: March 10 – December 6, 2004

Related
- Amor Descarado; La mujer en el espejo

Prisionera is a telenovela made by Telemundo and Caracol Televisión. This telenovela was aired in 16 countries around the world.

== Plot ==
Wrongfully accused of a crime she didn't commit, 16-year-old Guadalupe Santos is sentenced to 30 years in jail, while in jail she gives birth to a baby girl who is taken from her by her older sister Milagros. 15 years later she escapes jail and meets with Daniel Moncada, who turns out to be the brother of the man she was accused of killing. Searching for love, truth and her daughter, Guadalupe finds herself a prisoner of life.

== Cast ==
- Gabriela Spanic as Guadalupe Santos - Main heroine
- Gabriel Porras as Daniel Moncada (II) 111-180 episodes) - Main hero
- Mauricio Islas as Daniel Moncada (I) 1-110 episodes) - Main hero
- Gabriela Roel as Milagros Santos de Salvatierra - Sister of Guadelupe, villain
- Daniel Lugo as Rodolfo Russián - Lawyer of Rosalía, Killed by Lulu, villain
- Ricardo Dalmacci as Francisco 'Pancho' Salvatierra - Husband of Milagros
- Zully Montero as Rosalía Ríobueno viuda de Moncada - Mother of Daniel, Enrique and Ernesto
- Diana Quijano as Lucero 'Lulú' Ríobueno - Wife of Ernesto, Killed by Cobra, main villain
- Marisela González as Antonia 'Tuerta' Pinzon - Accomplice of Lulú, villain
- Carlos Caballero as Cipriano 'Cobra' Armenteros - Accomplice of Rodolfo, Killed by Lulu, villain
- Génesis Rodríguez as Libertad Salvatierra Santos - Daughter of Guadalupe
- Alejandro Chabán as Ronaldo 'Rony' Simancas - Killed by Teodoro "Tedy" Villamizar, villain
- Alfonso Diluca as Florentino 'Tito' Cabello - Servant of family Salvatierra
- César Román as Luis 'Lucho' Villa - Friend of Libertad
- Griselda Noguera as Matilde/Maté - Servant of family Salvatierra
- Gerardo Riverón as Padre Antonio - Reverend friend of family Salvatierra and Moncada
- Félix Loreto as Enrique/Ernesto Riobueno - Husband of Lulú, son of Rosalía, Killed by Lulu (Ernesto)
- Roberto Levermann as Maximo Gallardo - Mexican boyfriend of Monalisa
- William Colmenares as Tatam - Employee dumb of Salvatierra's house
- Carla Rodríguez as Adela Reyes - In love with of Pancho
- Martha Mijares as Mercedes Reyes, mother of Adela and Berenice
- Liz Gallardo as Monalisa García - Servant of family Salvatierra
- Jullye Giliberti as Ignacia 'Nacha' Vergara - Best friend of Guadalupe
- Rebeka Montoya as Patricia 'Patty' Salvatierra - Cousin of Libertad, Friend of Ronnie

=== Other cast ===
- Alexandra Acosta as Helena Montenegro de Moncada, killed by Lulu
- Marcela Serna as Berenice Reyes, killed by Ronnie
- Patricia Álvarez - Sandy Caplan
- Jorge Martínez - Ricardo Montenegro, killed by Cobra
- Ricardo Chávez - Santiago Mesa
- Jana Martínez - Madre Emilia, killed by Cobra
- Nelson Díaz - Inocencio Ramírez/Inocente Romero
- Alcira Gil - Otilia
- Bettina Grand - Sergeant Emilia Robinson, killed by Lulu
- Félix Loreto - Ernesto Ríobueno /Enrique
- Guisela Moro - Amiga de Helena
- Jose Luis Navas - Richard
- Gwendy Rodríguez - Carmela de Los Santos
- Katalina Krueger - Mariana
- Rosalinda Rodríguez - Wendy 'Tarántula' Saladio - Villana
- Yadira Santana - Caridad
- Gonzalo Vivanco - Dr. Alberti
- Carla Sánchez - Trina
- Nury Flores - Samantha
- David Abreu - Orson Valdez
- Marita Capote - Madre de Guadalupe y Milagros
- Sabrina Olmedo - Presa
- Ivonne d´Lize - Madre de Rodolfo
- Julio Ocampo - Rickie
- Álvaro Ruiz - Armando Simancas
- Jorge Hernández - Teniente Orestes Hernández
- Clemencia Velazquez - Jimena
- Morella Silva - Virginia
- Yaxkin Santalucía - Teodoro "Tedy" Villamizar
