= Del Toro (surname) =

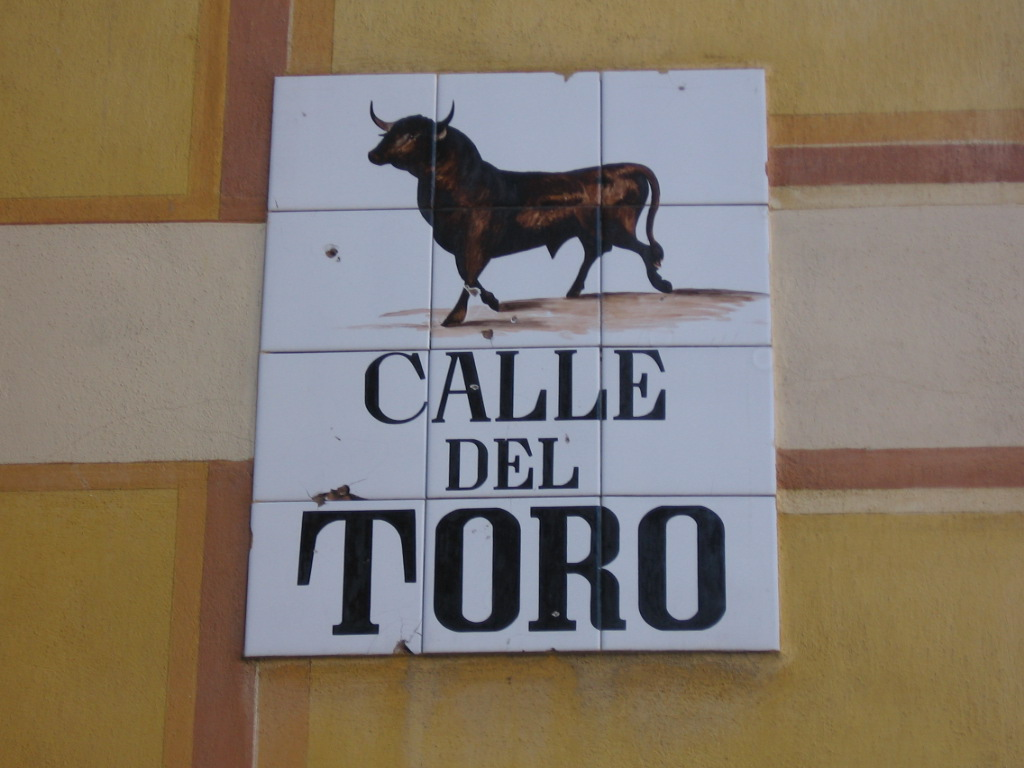
- Artistic street sign in Madrid, Spain.

Origin
- Language: Spanish
- Meaning: "Of the Bull"
- Region of origin: Zamora, Spain

Other names
- Variant forms: Del Toro, del Toro, Deltoro, Toro

Del Toro (Of the Bull in English) is a surname first found in the Castilian province of Zamora in Spain, dating back to the sixteenth century. It is also found in sixty-five communes throughout Italy with a predominant presence in the provinces of Teramo (Abruzzo) and Siena (Tuscany).

- Angelo Del Toro (1947–1994), New York politician
- Arancha del Toro, also known as Arancha Solis (born 1973), Spanish film, television, and theater actress
- Benicio del Toro (born 1967), Puerto Rican actor
- Carlos Del Toro (born 1961), Cuban-born American businessman and U.S. Secretary of the Navy nominee
- Carlos del Toro Orihuela (born 1954), Cuban artist
- David del Toro Jiménez (born 1997), known as David Toro, Spanish footballer
- Emiliano Mercado del Toro (1891-2007), for a while the oldest person in the world
- Emilio del Toro Cuebas (1876-1955), Chief Justice of the Supreme Court of Puerto Rico from 1909 to 1922
- Enrique Campos del Toro (1900–c.1970), Puerto Rican banker and law professor
- Guillermo del Toro (born 1964), Mexican film director
- Homero Del Toro, Jr. (born 1976), Mexican Actor, Executive Director of Operations Aveanna Healthcare
- Herminio Brau del Toro (1922–1998), Puerto Rican lawyer, engineer, professor, writer and industrialist
- Isaac del Toro (born 2003), Mexican cyclist
- Josefina del Toro Fulladosa (1901–1975), the first woman to become a library school professor in Puerto Rico
- Mario Enrique del Toro (born 1966), Mexican politician
- Miguel del Toro (1972–2001), Mexican baseball pitcher
- Miguel Carlos Francisco Alvarez del Toro (1917–1996), Mexican biologist
- Rebeca Pous Del Toro (born 1978), Spanish singer
- Salvador Barajas del Toro (born 1972), Mexican politician
- Tomás del Toro del Villar (born 1959), Mexican politician
- Ulises Rosales del Toro (born 1942), Cuban general and Minister of Agriculture
- Uriel del Toro (born 1978), Mexican actor and model
