= Del Toro =

Del Toro may refer to:

- Del Toro (surname)
- Del Toro Lake, a lake situated in southern Chile
  - Del Toro River
- San Giovanni del Toro, an eleventh-century church in Ravello, Italy
- Bocas del Toro Province, a Panamanian province
