= Elizabeth Gutiérrez =

American actress and model

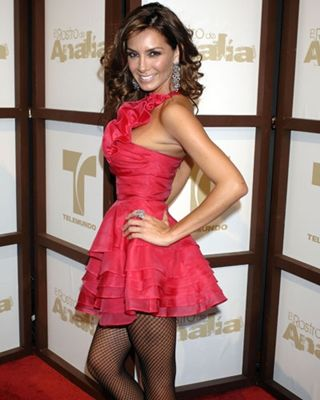
- Gutiérrez at the premiere of El Rostro de Analía in 2008
- Born: Elizabeth Gutiérrez Nevárez; 1 April 1979 (age 47); Los Angeles, California, U.S.
- Occupations: Actress; model
- Years active: 2003–present
- Partner: William Levy (2003–2024)
- Children: 2

Elizabeth Gutiérrez Nevárez is a Mexican-American actress and model. She is best known for playing the leading roles in the telenovelas El Rostro de Analía and El fantasma de Elena.

== Background ==
Gutiérrez was born in Los Angeles, California, to Mexican parents.

While working on Protagonistas de Novela, she began an on-off relationship with fellow contestant William Levy. Their relationship has been on-again, off-again since at least 2003. She gave birth to their son, Christopher Alexander, in 2006, and to their daughter, Kailey Alexandra, on March 6, 2010.

== Career ==
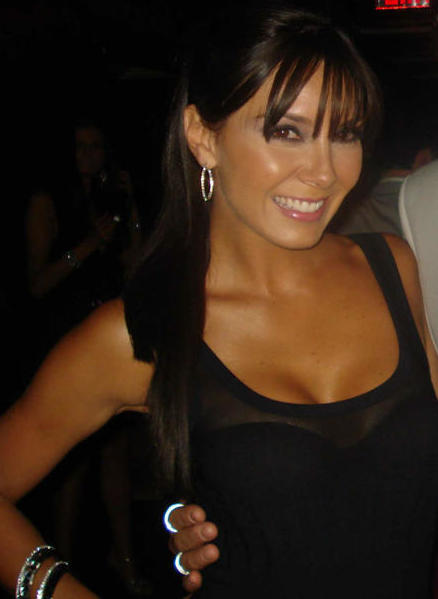
Gutiérrez in 2009

Gutiérrez had early work as a model on The Price Is Right. She participated in the second season of the reality show Protagonistas de Novela.

Gutiérrez began her work with a brief stint as a back up dancer on the TV show Cuanto Cuesta El Show in 2002. She then transitioned to telenovelas in 2005, playing the villain Isabela in Venevision International's Olvidarte jamás. She left the production 12 episodes before its end due to her first pregnancy. The next year she began playing Paola in Acorralada but left to take the lead role in Amor comprado. In 2007, she played the lead role in Isla paraíso, a mininovela of 15 two-minute episodes produced by Venevisión and published online.

In 2008, she took another female lead role, this time in the Telemundo telenovela El Rostro de Analía. The telenovela was broadcast in more than 50 countries; being on one of Telemundo's most popular telenovelas brought Gutiérrez worldwide recognition. In 2009, she turned down the role of Priscila on Bella calamidades to play a villain in the fifth remake of Corazón salvaje. Critics responded favorably to Gutiérrez's performance.

She went on to play the lead in El fantasma de Elena, her third leading role. This telenovela was not as popular as expected in the United States but was more successful elsewhere. It has been sold in 70 countries. She filmed the pilot episode for La Mala, La Buena y La Tonta but left the project in favor of El fantasma de Elena. She also appeared on the Univision reality show Mira quién baila on Univision. In 2012 she accepted the role of Mariana San Lucas, who swung between a father and a son, in El rostro de la venganza, from which telenovela she left early in its presentation.

== Filmography ==
List of appearances in television series, specials, game show and films
Year	Title	Role	Notes
2003	Protagonistas de Novela	Herself	Reality show
2004	Lingerie Bowl	Herself	Reality show
2005	The Price Is Right	Herself	Game show
2006	Olvidarte jamás	Isabella Neira	
2007	Acorralada	Paola Irazábal	
2008	Amor Comprado	Mariana Gómez	
2008	Fotonovela	Melanie / Vanilla	Film
2008–2009	El Rostro de Analía	Ana Rivera (Mariana Montiel) / Ana Lucía "Analía" Moncada / Analía's clone	178 episodes
2009–2010	Corazón salvaje	Rosenda Montes de Oca	102 episodes
2010–2011	El fantasma de Elena	Elena Lafé	117 episodes
2011	Mira quién baila	Herself	Reality show
2012	El rostro de la venganza	Mariana	
2017	Milagros de Navidad	Lolita Martínez	Episode: "Lolita"
2018	El fantasma de mi novia	Elena	Film
2025	Velvet: El nuevo imperio	Sara Sahagún	Guest star
2025	La isla: desafío extremo	Herself	Reality show (season 2; 17th place)
2026	Sin senos sí hay paraíso	Diva Montero	Season 4
TBA	Emergencias. Unidad de vida	TBA	
