= Emergencias. Unidad de vida =

- Genre: Medical drama
- Created by: Carlos Eloy Castro
- Directed by: Nicolas Di Blasi; Luis Sierra
- Starring: Ana Brenda Contreras; Erick Elías
- Country of origin: United States
- Original language: Spanish

Production
- Executive producer: Martha Godoy
- Producer: Minú Chacin
- Production company: Telemundo Studios

Original release
- Network: Telemundo

Emergencias. Unidad de vida is an upcoming American telenovela created by Carlos Eloy Castro for Telemundo. It stars Ana Brenda Contreras and Erick Elías. The series follows Gabriela Serrano, a medical resident who returns to Florida to confront her estranged father while facing a corrupt and troubled hospital system.

== Cast ==
- Ana Brenda Contreras as Gabriela Serrano
- Erick Elías as Camilo Escalante
- Geraldine Bazán
- Ana Belena
- Rodolfo Salas
- Elizabeth Gutiérrez
- Laura Flores
- Mónica Dionne
- David Palacio
- Luis Ernesto Franco
- Arturo Peniche
- Gloria Aura
- Jerónimo Cantillo
- Elena Medina
- Miguel Ferreira
- Paola Fernández
- Pepe Gámez
- Vince Miranda
- Roberto Mateos
- Gloria Peralta
- Emma Ramos
- Sebastián Silva
- Johann Vera
- Sara Linares

== Production ==
On 8 May 2026, the series was announced by Telemundo at their upfront for the 2026–2027 television season. Filming began on 7 September 2026.
