= La isla: desafío extremo season 1 =

Reality show season

La isla: desafío extremo
- Season 1
- Hosted by: Javier Poza
- No. of contestants: 27
- Winner: Adrián Di Monte
- Runner-up: Hubert Riascos
- Location: Turkey
- No. of episodes: 66

Release
- Original network: Telemundo
- Original release: July 30 – October 14, 2024

Season chronology
- Next → Season 2

The first season of the American competitive reality television series La isla: desafío extremo premiered on July 30, 2024, on Telemundo. The season was filmed in Turkey. The season ended on October 14, 2024, when Adrián Di Monte was crowned the winner.

== Format ==
The season places a group of celebrities and civilians in isolated locations throughout Turkey, where they are divided into three teams: the Eagles, the Sharks, and the Panthers. Each week, teams compete for their living conditions, either High Beach with all amenities, Medium Beach with some amenities or Low Beach with no amenities at all. In addition, they will compete for leadership, immunity and rewards. The contestants are progressively eliminated from the game as they are voted out by their fellow contestants. The last contestant standing wins the grand prize of $200,000.

== Contestants ==
24 contestants were initially selected to compete. The first group was announced on July 1, 2024. The second group was announced on July 10, 2024. On August 9, 2024, Monse Castillo entered the game to replace Regina Fernandez. On August 13, 2024, Viviana Michel entered the game to replace Julia Gama. On August 20, 2024, Uriel del Toro entered the game to replace Julián Gil.

Contestant	Age	Occupation	Team			Finish	
Contestant	Age	Occupation	Original	Absorbed	Merged	Placement	Episode
Julia Gama	31	Model and actress	Eagles			Quit (Injury)	7
Regina Fernández	23	Journalism student	Panthers			Quit (Medical condition)	9
Carlos Caquias	30	Personal trainer	Panthers			Quit (Injury)	10
José Sedek	40	Actor	Eagles			1st Eliminated	12
Julián Gil	54	Actor and TV host	Eagles			Quit (Injury)	17
Aylín Mújica	49	Actress	Eagles			2nd Eliminated	18
Carmen Aub	34	Actress	Eagles			3rd Eliminated	24
Gisella Aboumrad	44	Actress	Sharks			4th Eliminated	30
Sergio Mayer	58	Actor and politician	Eagles	Panthers		Quit (Legal obligation in Mexico)	33
Samira Jalil	33	Influencer and TV personality	Sharks	Sharks		Quit (Injury)	34
Chuy Almada	35	Boxer	Sharks	Sharks		5th Eliminated	36
Sebastián Caicedo	43	Actor	Eagles	Panthers		6th Eliminated	42
Adolfo Rodríguez	31	Biologist	Panthers	Panthers		7th Eliminated	48
Valeria Guajardo	26	Fashion designer and TV host	Panthers	Panthers		8th Eliminated	51
Tony Garza	37	Actor	Sharks	Sharks		Quit	52
Alejandro Salgado	24	Model and MMA fighter	Panthers	Panthers		9th Eliminated	54
Cristina Eustace	45	Singer	Sharks	Sharks		10th Eliminated	57
Monse Castillo	27	Entrepreneur	Panthers	Panthers		11th Eliminated	60
Awilda Herrera	32	Influencer	Panthers	Panthers	Merged	12th Eliminated	61
Alba Prado	31	Model and athlete	Panthers	Panthers	Merged	13th Eliminated	62
Viviana Michel	26	Soccer player	Eagles	Sharks	Merged	14th Eliminated	63
Angélica Celaya	42	Actress	Eagles	Panthers	Merged	15th Eliminated	64
Uriel del Toro	46	Actor	Eagles	Sharks	Merged	16th Eliminated	65
Natalia Alcocer	35	Actress and TV personality	Sharks	Sharks	Merged	4th Place	66
Guty Carrera	33	TV personality	Sharks	Sharks	Merged	3rd Place	66
Hubert Riascos	29	TV personality	Panthers	Panthers	Merged	Runner-up	66
Adrián Di Monte	33	Actor	Sharks	Sharks	Merged	Winner	66

== Voting history ==
	Original teams																				Absorbed teams																																				
Week	1				2				3				4				5				6				7									8							9										10						
Episode	3		6		9		12		15		18		21		24		27		30		33		36		39				40	42				45				46	48		50	51				52	54				56	57			58	60	
Eliminated	None (Note: The Elimination Challenge was cancelled and the nominees were safe.)				José				Aylín				Carmen				Gisella				Chuy				Sebastián									Adolfo							Valeria					Alejandro					Cristina				Monse		
Team	Eagles	Sharks	Eagles	Panthers	Eagles	Sharks	Eagles	Panthers	Eagles	Sharks	Eagles	Panthers	Sharks	Eagles	Eagles	Panthers	Sharks	Panthers	Panthers	Eagles	Panthers	Sharks	Panthers	Sharks	Panthers		Sharks		Panthers	Panthers		Sharks		Panthers		Sharks		Panthers	Panthers		Panthers	Panthers		Sharks		Panthers	Panthers		Sharks		Panthers	Panthers		Sharks	Panthers	Panthers	Sharks
Nominated	José Angélica	Tony	Julián Carmen	Regina	José Aylín	Cristina	Angélica Carmen	Valeria	Angélica Aylín	Cristina	Sergio Carmen	Alba	Cristina Gisella	Carmen	Sergio Angélica	Valeria	Gisella Cristina	Monse	Valeria Awilda	Sergio	Angélica	Uriel	Awilda	Chuy	Sebastián		Cristina		Hubert	Awilda		Tony		Hubert		Cristina		Alba	Angélica Adolfo		Awilda Valeria	Hubert		Tony		Awilda	Alejandro Hubert		Guty Natalia		Alba Hubert	Awilda		Cristina	Monse	Angélica	Uriel
Votes	5–3	7–1–1	7–1	7–1–1	4–3–1	6–2	5–3	4–1–1	3-3	5-3-1	5-1	6-1	4–4–1	2–1–1–1	4–1	5–3	6–2–1	2–1–1–1–1–1	5–2–1	4–1	7–3	6–4	6–3–1	7–2	7–4		6–3		None (Note: After winning the Sentencing Challenge, The Sharks chose Hubert to go directly to Elimination Challenge.)	7–2–2		8–1		6-4		6-3		None (Note: After winning the Sentencing Challenge, The Sharks chose Alba to go directly to Elimination Challenge.)	8–7–6		None (Note: After winning the Punishment Challenge, The Sharks chose Awilda and Valeria to go directly to Elimination Challenge.)	6–3		6–2–1		None (Note: After winning the Sentencing Challenge, The Sharks chose Awilda to go directly to Elimination Challenge.)	5–3		6–2		None (Note: After winning the Punishment Challenge, The Sharks chose Alba and Hubert to go directly to Elimination Challenge.)	4–3		5–1–1	None (Note: After winning the Sentencing Challenge, The Sharks chose Monse to go directly to Elimination Challenge.)	4-2	5-1
Voter	Vote																																																								
Adrián		Tony		Adolfo		Cristina				Cristina			Cristina				Cristina					Uriel		Chuy			Cristina					Tony		Hubert	Hubert	Cristina			Adolfo	Adolfo				Tony					Natalia					Cristina			Uriel
Adrián		Tony		Adolfo		Cristina				Cristina			Cristina				Cristina					Uriel		Chuy			Cristina					Tony		Hubert	Hubert	Cristina			Awilda	Awilda				Tony					Natalia					Cristina			Uriel
Alba				Regina				Valeria		Tony		Alejandro				Valeria		Awilda	Valeria		Angélica		Monse		Sebastián					Monse				Alejandro					Angélica	Angélica		Monse					Alejandro					Angélica				Angélica	
Ángelica	José		Julián		José		Carmen		Aylín		Sergio			Carmen	Sergio					Sergio	Awilda		Awilda		Alejandro					Awilda				Hubert					Adolfo	Awilda		Hubert					Hubert					Awilda				Awilda	
Awilda				Regina				Valeria				Alba				Valeria		Alba	Valeria		Angélica		Valeria		Sebastián					Monse				Alejandro					Angélica	Angélica		Monse					Alejandro					Angélica				Angélica	
Guty		Tony				Cristina				Gisella			Cristina				Gisella		Alba			Tony		Chuy			Cristina					Tony				Cristina								Tony					Natalia					Cristina			Uriel
Hubert				Regina				Valeria				Alba	Tony			Valeria		Adolfo	Valeria		Angélica		Valeria		Sebastián					Angélica				Alejandro					Angélica	Angélica		Monse					Alejandro					Angélica	Angélica (Note: To break the tie with Awilda, Hubert decided to give Angélica an extra vote.)	Viviana		Angélica	Uriel
Natalia		Tony				Tony				Cristina			Cristina			Awilda	Gisella					Uriel		Chuy			Cristina					Tony				Cristina								Tony					Guty					Cristina			Uriel
Uriel														None (Note: Due to the fact that he had been in the competition for less than a week, Uriel could not be nominated and was not eligible to vote.)	None					Sergio		Tony		Chuy			Cristina					Tony				Cristina								Tony					Guty					Cristina			Viviana
Viviana									None (Note: Due to the fact that she had been in the competition for less than a week, Viviana could not be nominated and was not eligible to vote.)		None			Carmen	Sergio					Sergio		Tony		Chuy	Alejandro	Alejandro	Cristina			Awilda	Awilda	Tony				Cristina						Hubert	Hubert	Uriel			Alejandro	Alejandro	Guty			Awilda		Cristina		Awilda	Uriel
Monse								None (Note: Due to the fact that she had been in the competition for less than a week, Monse could not be nominated and was not eligible to vote.)				Alba				Valeria		Alejandro	Valeria		Angélica		Awilda		Sebastián					Awilda				Hubert					Adolfo	Awilda		Hubert		Tony	Tony		Hubert		Guty	Guty		Awilda				Angélica	
Cristina		Tony				Tony				Gisella			Gisella				Gisella				Awilda	Uriel	Awilda	Chuy			Natalia					Tony				Natalia								Adrián					Guty					Natalia			
Alejandro				Regina				Valeria				Alba				Awilda		Monse	Awilda		Angélica		Awilda		Sebastián					Awilda				Hubert					Adolfo	Awilda		Hubert					Hubert										
Tony		Chuy				Cristina				Cristina			Gisella				Gisella					Uriel		Chuy			Cristina					Natalia				Cristina								Uriel													
Valeria				Regina				Hubert				Alba				Awilda		Monse	Awilda		Angélica	Tony	Awilda	Tony	Sebastián					Awilda				Hubert					Adolfo	Awilda		Hubert															
Adolfo				Regina				Awilda				Alba				Valeria		Hubert	Valeria		Angélica		Valeria		Sebastián		Natalia	Natalia		Angélica		Tony	Tony	Alejandro		Natalia	Natalia		Angélica	Angélica																	
Adolfo				Regina				Awilda				Alba				Valeria		Hubert	Valeria		Angélica		Valeria		Sebastián		Natalia	Natalia		Angélica		Tony	Tony	Alejandro		Natalia	Natalia		Adolfo (Note: To break the tie with Awilda, Adolfo decided to give himself an extra vote.)																		
Sebastián	Angélica		Julián		Aylín		Carmen		Angélica		Sergio			Sergio	Sergio		Gisella			Sergio	Awilda		Awilda		Alejandro					Awilda																											
Chuy		Tony				Cristina				Gisella	Sergio		Gisella				Cristina					Uriel		Tony																																	
Samira		Tony				Cristina	Angélica			Cristina			Gisella				Gisella					Uriel																																			
Sergio	Angélica		Julián		Aylín		Angélica		Aylín		Carmen			Sebastián	Angélica					Uriel																																					
Gisella		Tony				Cristina				Cristina			Cristina				Tony																																								
Carmen	José		Julián		José		Angélica		Angélica		Sergio			Viviana	Sergio																																										
Aylín	José		Julián		José		Carmen		Angélica		Sergio																																														
Julián	José		Carmen		José		Angélica		Aylín																																																
José	Angélica		Carmen		Aylín		Angélica																																																		
Carlos		Samira		Regina	Sergio																																																				
Regina				Regina																																																					
Julia	José		Julián																																																						

== Episodes ==
No.	Title	Original release date
Week 1: Istanbul
1	"La hora cero"	July 30, 2024
Mission Challenge: In pairs, team members were provided with a map and clue sheet to find the six pieces of the color of their team. The first pair to find the most pieces and raise their flag won the symbol of Istanbul. The Sharks won the challenge.; Territorial Challenge: Four members of each team had six cubes to make a path and walk on them through the course without touching the sand. When they reached the tower with the two remaining cubes for the puzzle, they knocked them down to obtain the eight cubes of the puzzle. Once they got to the perimeter line, the teams completed the partially built puzzle. Afterwards, one member rolled balls down a ramp and hit at least three of them into the boxes. The Eagles won the right to stay at the High Beach. The Panthers and Sharks then competed against each other for the keys to Medium Beach; the former team won and the latter was sent to Low Beach.; Captains' Battle: Team captains Adrián, Julián and Carlos competed with a partner of their choice. Each pair was connected by an elastic band that was anchored to the ground and had to pull as far as possible to collect the number cubes and take them to their board. The captain then used the cubes to form vertically and horizontally the sum of 15. Adrián and Samira won the challenge and received an advantage for an upcoming challenge.
2	"Reto por el castigo"	July 31, 2024
Punishment Challenge: One teammate was inside a hamster ball while two others pushed it around the course. Along the way, the teammate inside the ball had climb on top of the ball and knock down sacks hanging from three poles, which contained hoops. At the end of the course, the fourth team member, with their hands tied, used a metal stinger to guide the hoops through an asymmetrical structure until they were threaded into the wooden post. The Sharks win the challenge and avoid the punishment. The Panthers decide to punish Hubert, while the Eagles punish Aylín and Carmen. The three went to the port to help the local fishermen with their daily chores, which included equipment maintenance, loading, unloading and sorting fish.; Adventure Challenge: Each team of six members held a bar with a basket at each end on their shoulders and walked through thin beams to retrieve sandbags. Afterwards, they returned to the starting point and threw the sandbags up to the platform at the top of the tower. The Sharks won the challenge and enjoyed an evening sailing the waters of the Black Sea in Istanbul.
3	"El juicio de la isla"	August 1, 2024
Immunity Challenge: In each round, four contestants from each team competed. They started tied to a base and had to unroll a flag, tie it to a pole and do the same with another flag, this time crossing a beam. Then, they split up and one teammate climbed onto a platform to extend another flag, which two teammates guided as a ramp to hit balls into baskets. The Panthers won after accumulating three points.; Honor Challenge: In pairs, team members climbed barrels to move around the course and remove all obstacles in order to retrieve the sacks with two buoys inside. Afterwards, they returned to the start of the course by pushing the barrels, and stacked them to insert a rod to complete their base. One teammate had to hit three buoys on the rods. The Sharks, accumulating four points, won the challenge.; At the Trial, the Sharks nominated Tony for elimination, while the Eagles nominated Angélica and José.
4	"Dando guerra"	August 2, 2024
Money Challenge: Four teammates held an unstable base with a ball to start the course. They walked through various obstacles and collected three additional balls along the way. After collecting all four balls, one team member used a blowgun to pop seven balloons. The winners received an extra $15,000. The Sharks won the challenge.; Territory Revenge Challenge: Two teammates started the challenge by wrapping a rope around a wheel to obtain the wooden rods that served as support along the course. Afterwards, they had to fill their vase with water from a pond to carry it through the course. After going through obstacles, the third teammate handed them a second vase with which they poured the water to fill a container and pass the container mark. The Sharks used their advantage, which was to avoid one of the obstacles. The Eagles were unable to defend their territory and moved to Low Beach. The Panthers won the challenge and moved to High Beach, while the Sharks came in second place and moved to Medium Beach.
5	"Traición o estrategia"	August 4, 2024
Power Challenge: The contestants had to transport one by one five cubes to the end of the course; going through a ramp, a balance beam, and a small fence. They used the cubes to build a tower that formed the drawing of a triangle. Afterwards, they shot at the tower to throw all the cubes off the base. Chuy won the challenge.; Reward Challenge: The teams competed for the opportunity to visit a hammam and enjoy a massage and snacks. Three teammates had to break a box that contained a board that served as a bridge to move between logs of the course. Once they reached the end of the course, one teammate had to break another box to retrieve balls, while the other two teammates used boards to make a ramp and roll the balls to their basket. The Panthers won the challenge but it was revealed that team captain Carlos could only choose three teammates to visit the hammam with him. Carlos picked Awilda, Regina and Adolfo.
6	"Por el honor y la salvación"	August 5, 2024
Immunity Challenge: Each team used a log as a ladder to reach two bags, each containing a ball. Afterwards, they used a stick to take down a hanging key that opened a chest containing a bucket with three spheres. Finally, they built a seesaw using their log and the bucket with spheres and a teammate had to shoot two balls into each basket to earn a point. The Sharks won the challenge after scoring three points.; Honor Challenge: Two teammates pushed a carriage, while another pulled it from the front with a harness, around a course to collect six rings. At the end of the course, one teammate climbed on a barrier and threw the rings onto a post to earn a point. The Panthers won the challenge after scoring four points.; At the Trial, the Panthers nominated Regina for elimination, while the Eagles nominated Julián and Carmen. Chuy used his Power Bracelet to save Tony from the Elimination Challenge.: Elimination Challenge: Javier announced that the Elimination Challenge was canceled and the nominees were safe for another week.
Week 2: Cappadocia
7	"Al borde del abismo"	August 6, 2024
Javier announces that Julia Gama suffered an injury and by medical recommendation had to abandon the competition.: Mission Challenge: The teams visited a pottery workshop in Cappadocia where they were taught how to make a vase. One teammate had 10 minutes to replicate the vase shown by Javier. The Eagles won the symbol of Cappadocia.; Territorial Challenge: One teammate walked on a giant dice while three other teammates spun it through the course. They stopped under each of the arcs, climbed the ladder, and retrieved the rings. At the final obstacle, they removed wooden canes blocking their way. Upon reaching the wall, the teams hit their rings on each of the poles while on top of their dice and supported by a metal bar. The Sharks won the keys to High Beach. In the second round, The Eagles won the keys to Medium Beach, while the Panthers were sent to Low Beach.; Captains' Battle: Team captains Carmen, Carlos and Samira start the challenge by stacking a cylinder, a ring, and a golf ball on top of a wooden base. They repeat this process at two more stops in the course and must carry all three stacks to the end of the course. Samira won and received the advantage of removing an obstacle from an upcoming challenge.
8	"Un castigo penoso"	August 7, 2024
Punishment Challenge: Two teammates were tied together and blindfolded while a third member stood on a platform at the end of the course and guided them to find the five pieces of a cube scattered through the course. Once all pieces were found, the teams had to assemble their cube in the fastest time. The Sharks won and avoided the punishment of cleaning horse stables. The Panthers decide to punish Alejandro, while the Eagles punish Angélica and José.; Adventure Challenge: Three teammates were tied by their feet and began the challenge by crossing a mud pit and rolling a ball down a ramp to retrieve it. Afterwards, they crossed a rope maze to reach the shooting line. Once there, they held two bamboo sticks over their shoulders as a ramp to roll the ball to the basket. The Sharks won a hot air balloon ride.
9	"Sin escapatoria"	August 8, 2024
Regina announces that due to a medical problem that prevents her from competing in challenges, she has decided to leave the competition.: Immunity Challenge: Two contestants per team used a sphere to score goals in their own team goal and could use their sphere to prevent another team from scoring a goal. The teams had to score two goals to get a point. The Panthers won the challenge after scoring three points.; Honor Challenge: Two contestants per team used spatulas to transport three disks to the end of the course. Afterwards, they positioned the disks on posts and one teammate had to knock them down using sandbags in order to earn a point. The Sharks, accumulating four points, won the challenge.; At the Trial, the Sharks nominated Cristina for elimination, while the Eagles nominated José and Aylín.
10	"¡Por el dinero y la revancha!"	August 9, 2024
Javier announces that Carlos must abandon the competition due to the severity of his ankle injury. Alba is voted as the Panthers' new captain for the remainder of the week. Javier also reveals that new contestant Monse will join the Panthers as Regina's replacement.: Money Challenge: One teammates began the challenge tied to a tangled rope in a section of the course. After freeing themselves from the rope, they climbed a ladder to retrieve two buckets from the tower. The other teammate filled the buckets with water and passed them back to the teammate at the tower so they could empty them in the container and make the ball inside rise and fall out. The Panthers won the challenge and received an extra $15,000.; Territory Revenge Challenge: Two teammates balanced a scale and dodged obstacles to transport six spheres to the end of the course. They then used 30 pieces of wood to build a tower of ten layers of triangles. The Sharks successfully defended their territory and stayed at High Beach. The Eagles also kept their territory and returned to Medium Beach, while the Panthers remained at Low Beach.
11	"El misterioso poder del brazalete"	August 11, 2024
Power Challenge: The contestants began the course passing over a beam and collecting the four sandbags on top of it. They passed through various obstacles until reaching the shooting range. Using a paddle, they had to shoot their sandbags into the basket. Adrián won the challenge.; Reward Challenge: The teams competed for a traditional Turkish dinner accompanied by a wine tasting. Two teammates must transport six numbered cubes to the other side of the course and use them to build four towers in ascending order. Afterwards, they took a ball and made it bounced on at least three of the towers to get it into the basket. The Sharks won the challenge.
12	"A punto del destierro"	August 12, 2024
Immunity Challenge: Three teammates began the challenge tied together by a rope and made their way through the course until reaching their two other teammates. Afterwards, all five members used the letter blocks to form the word "Cappadocia" in the arch. The Sharks won the challenge after scoring three points.; Honor Challenge: Two teammates were chained by one hand and a foot to a pole. They broke free by walking along a metal ring and reach the top of the it to advance. The pair then searched in the haystacks for the hidden key that would free their third teammate, who was chained to a ladder blocking their way. They continued the course until reaching the shooting range, where they knocked down three wood posts. The Panthers won the challenge.; At the Trial, the Panthers nominated Valeria for elimination, while the Eagles nominated Angélica and Carmen. Adrián used his Power Bracelet to save Cristina from the Elimination Challenge.: Elimination Challenge: The nominees hung a vase on each foot and kept them suspended in the air without touching the ground. José was the first to drop a vase and was eliminated from the competition.
Week 3: Artvin
13	"Nuevo capitán"	August 13, 2024
Mission Challenge: One member per team followed a path where a Tulum was located and had to blow it for ten continuous seconds. The Panthers won the symbol of Artvin.; Javier announces that new contestant Viviana will join the Eagles as Julia's replacement.: Territorial Challenge: Three teammates advanced through the course while trapped inside a fishing net. After passing through the obstacles, they used a rod to hook five fish and hang them on their board. The Panthers won the right to stay at High Beach. In the second round, The Sharks won the keys to Medium Beach, while the Eagles were sent to Low Beach.; Captains' Battle: Team captains Alba, Chuy and Sergio competed with a partner of their choice. Each pair used metal paddles to lift a ball out of the top of a cylindrical cage. After scoring two points, Alba and Adolfo won the challenge and received an advantage for an upcoming challenge.
14	"Puede ser grave"	August 14, 2024
Punishment Challenge: One member per team wore a straitjacket and rolled around the obstacles until reaching the end of the course. Afterwards, they used their heads to put three balls into a sandbox. The Panthers won and avoided the punishment of sleeping in a tractor-trailer full of hay. The Eagles decide to punish Julián, while the Sharks punish Cristina and Tony.; Adventure Challenge: Four teammates began the challenge by passing through various obstacles. At the end of the course, they searched for frisbees inside a sandpit and then hit at least three them in their basket. The Panthers won the opportunity to go whitewater rafting in the Çoruh river.
15	"Fuertes intrigas"	August 15, 2024
Immunity Challenge: At the start of the course, one teammate hooked two poles and knocked them down, they passed underneath a crawl space to collect two more poles and used all four poles to build a bridge and pass over it. In the next section of the course, another teammate retrieved the fifth pole. Once the five poles were collected, each pair placed them on a base and inserted a gutter into the upper rings to slide a ball that would roll into a grid. The Panthers won the challenge after scoring three points.; Honor Challenge: One teammate was strapped to a stretcher, while four other teammates carried them through the course. After passing through the obstacles, the stretcher was placed on a platform and the strapped teammate held a stand with two wooden plates to catch the sandbags thrown by their teammates. Two sandbags had to be caught in order to earn a point. The Sharks won the challenge.; At the Trial, the Sharks nominated Cristina for elimination, while the Eagles nominated Angélica and Aylín.
16	"Desesperados"	August 16, 2024
Surprise Challenge: One teammate climbed a pole to retrieve the flag at the top. Then, the teams used the pole as a ladder to the cross the next obstacle. When reaching the sand pile, they broke through a fence and took the keys to free their fourth teammate. Afterwards, the entire team took a hook from each rope to move their blocks one by one to build a tower on a platform. The Sharks won the challenge after earning two points and each member received an 85-inch TV.; Territory Revenge Challenge: Four blindfolded teammates pulled a cart carrying one of their teammates, who guided them through the course and to the posts where they had pick up the balls found inside the bags. After collecting all the balls, they hooked their cart in the shooting area, where the sixth teammate was suspended in a harness. The team's guide threw balls at the suspended teammate, who had to catch and hold them. Four balls had to be held simultaneously to earn a point. The Sharks won the challenge and moved to High Beach, sending the Panthers to Medium Beach. The Eagles came in third place and remained in Low Beach.
17	"Momentos de tristeza"	August 18, 2024
Javier announces that Julián must abandon the competition due to the recovery time of his torn bicep.: Power Challenge: The contestants began with their legs and arms tied up and searched for three rope knots at the end of the course. They took them back one by one to the starting point and tossed them onto their platform. Hubert won the challenge.; Reward Challenge: The teams competed for the opportunity to attend a traditional festival in Artvin and enjoy local music and food. In pairs, a blindfolded partner began the challenge by unscrewing a wooden bolt and, with the help of a partner who could see, looked for the rings scattered along the course and placed it on their team pole. Three rings had to be collected to earn a point. The Sharks won the challenge and invited Aylín, Carmen and Sebastián to the festival for coming in second place.
18	"No hay marcha atrás"	August 19, 2024
Immunity Challenge: Four teammates knocked down a box, placed it on their support pole and carried it through the course until reaching the tossing area. Then, a contestant launched balls with a slingshot to knock down two towers of balls. The Sharks won the challenge after scoring three points.; Honor Challenge: Two teammates navigated the course by spinning a ball inside a bottomless bowl and keeping it from falling. While spinning the bowl, they passed through various obstacles until reaching the deposit box. Another teammate slid a second ball through a chute and maneuver it so it would land in the final basket. The Panthers, accumulating three points, won the challenge.; At the Trial, the Panthers nominated Alba for elimination, while the Eagles nominated Sergio and Carmen. Hubert used his Power Bracelet to save Alba from the Elimination Challenge.: Elimination Challenge: Each nominee walked on a beam to reach the platform containing 18 pieces of wood. With the help of a pitchfork, they picked up the pieces and carried them from the platform to the base in front of them and built a tower that had to stand for three seconds. Aylín came in last place and was eliminated from the competition.
Week 4: Artvin
19	"El poder de Uriel"	August 20, 2024
Javier announces that new contestant Uriel will join the Eagles as Julián's replacement.: Mission Challenge: One contestant had to memorize the order of traditional elements from the region of Artvin region that were on a table, and then place them on another shelf. The first contestant to arrange the objects in the correct order won the symbol of Artvin. The Sharks won the challenge.; Territorial Challenge: One teammate climbed up a platform, while the other teammates tightened the net so their teammate could cross. Then, they built a bridge using columns so their teammate could walk through the course. The teammate collected cubes from each platform. On the last platform, the team built a tower by arranging the cubes from largest to smallest. The Sharks won the keys to High Beach. In the second round, The Panthers won the keys to Medium Beach, while the Eagles went to Low Beach.; Captains' Battle: Team captains Angélica, Hubert and Natalia stood under an arch that held a metal mesh. They moved two balls that were at the beginning of the arch to a container at the end of it, using only their fingers. Hubert scored two points and won the challenge for the Panthers.
20	"¿Castigo o aventura?"	August 21, 2024
Punishment Challenge: Teammates went through the course holding a cube with the help of two wooden paddles. Without dropping their cube, they crossed the obstacles and collected a second cube. Afterwards, the teams finished assembling their pitching bridge and threw sandbags into the cubes to slide them through the bridge and make them fall down. The Panthers won the challenge and avoided the punishment of doing heavy-duty work at a local farm. Hubert was responsible of deciding which members of the other teams had to serve the punishment; he decided to punish Sergio of the Eagles and Gisella and Natalia of the Sharks.; Adventure Challenge: The teams competed for the opportunity to climb the slope of Mount Karadağ and enjoy a Turkish meal. One contestant, serving as the shooter, stood on the central platform with a member of the opposing team on each side. The shooter threw five balls trying to score as many goals as possible. At the end of the course, there were two goalkeepers, each from a rival team, who were blindfolded and equipped with a shield to block the balls from entering the goal. The Eagles won the challenge.
21	"Rivalidad ardiente entre Panteras"	August 22, 2024
Immunity Challenge: Two teammates rolled their other teammate inside a barrel throughout the course while collecting four bags with balls. At the end of the course, one teammate, with the help a catapult, pitched three balls into the barrel using their foot to score a point. The Panthers won the challenge after scoring three points.; Honor Challenge: Each pair was tied to a harness attached to a counterweight that limited their mobility. They pulled on the rope to stretch it, allowing them to reach the pieces placed on the tables around them. One teammate used a clamp to grab the pieces, while the other helped by maintaining the tension on the tope. Each piece obtained was placed on their table to build a tower. The Eagles, accumulating three points, won the challenge.; At the Trial, the Eagles nominated Carmen for elimination, while the Sharks nominated Cristina and Gisella.
22	"¡Se quiere ir!"	August 23, 2024
Surprise Challenge: A contestant was seated on a rotating base with a coiled rope and one teammate pulled on the rope to make the base spin. The contestant crossed throughout the course and untangled a rope to retrieve the key that opened a coffin containing cubes. The cubes were used to build a tower on the rotating base, with the numerical pattern for their tower indicated on the board. Afterwards, the rope on the base was pulled to deploy their banner. The Eagles won and each member received an all-inclusive Caribbean cruise for two people.; Territory Revenge Challenge: In pairs, teams climbed a net obstacle, knocked down the balls, and gathered them on the other side to advance to the first shooting line where they knocked down six tiles used to assemble a ladder. Afterwards, they crossed to the other side and collected water to pour in their tank that served as a counterweight to open the door. At the second shooting line, the shooter rolled more balls over a ramp and into three holes. The Sharks defended their territory and stayed at High Beach. The Panthers kept their keys to Medium Beach, while the Eagles remained at Low Beach.
23	"Fuerte argumento"	August 25, 2024
Power Challenge: The contestants used a tray to transport balls through the obstacle course and to the candlestick. Once there, they arranged the balls in place and continued to the pitching area, where they made the balls bounce on a cube to dunk them. Chuy won the challenge.; Reward Challenge: The teams competed to receive a letter and photo from their family members. The teams began the challenge by unscrewing the first three logs of the puzzle and crossed the first beam. They untied the fourth log that was hanging and moved on the next beam. Afterwards, they built their puzzle and raised their flag. The Eagles won the challenge. For coming in second place, Chuy and Natalia of the Sharks were picked to also receive letters.
24	"¡A zarpazos!"	August 26, 2024
Immunity Challenge: In pairs, the teams crossed the net to reach a rope braid that they untangled through a mechanism they figured out to get a key. They opened a chest to retrieve the knife with which they cut the rope that released the balls inside the box. With a slingshot, a teammate launched the balls to knock down the targets. The Sharks won after accumulating three points.; Honor Challenge: One contestant from each team faced each other on a balance beam and knocked down their opponent with a combat bar. Whoever managed to knock down their opponent twice won a point. The Panthers, accumulating five points, won the challenge.; At the Trial, the Panthers nominated Valeria for elimination, while the Eagles nominated Sergio and Angélica. Chuy used his Power Bracelet to save Cristina from the Elimination Challenge.: Elimination Challenge: Each nominee assembled two rectangles made up of six pieces each and placed them on their bases. Afterwards, they threw sandbags through them to land on the table on the other side without knocking down the rectangles. Carmen came in last place and was eliminated from the competition.
Week 5: Antalya
25	"Llegan a Antalya"	August 27, 2024
Mission Challenge: One blindfolded teammate with their hands tied up searched through the course for six buried eggs, while their partner told them where to dig. Each egg contained pieces to a puzzle. The Panthers won the challenge.; Territorial Challenge: Two teammates passed through various obstacles and collected four bags with puzzle pieces. Afterwards, they built their puzzle by connecting the circles with the squares of the same color. The Panthers won the right to stay at High Beach. In the second round, The Sharks won the keys to Medium Beach, while the Eagles were sent to Low Beach.; Captains' Battle: Team captains Alejandro, Guty and Sebastián had a board with letters in random order and spelled words given by Javier by sliding the letters along the mechanism. Alejandro scored two points and won the challenge for the Panthers.
26	"¡Sube la temperatura!"	August 28, 2024
Punishment Challenge: Two teammates went across a wooden arch and placed a straw sack on the three beams on the way. Afterwards, they picked up three bags containing a tied key and wooden pieces that were used to assemble a frame. Using their key, the teams unlocked a padlock to retrieve their board and build a seesaw. The seesaw was used to place three balls on top of bases. The Panthers won the challenge and avoided the punishment of spending the night in a small boat offshore without food. Alejandro decided to punish Uriel of the Eagles and Adrián and Guty of the Sharks.; Adventure Challenge: Two teammates caught balls launched by another teammate using a slingshot, with rival teams being able to prevent this from happening. The team that scored the most balls received a point. The Panthers won the challenge after scoring three points and received a scuba diving lesson.
27	"Alto riesgo"	August 29, 2024
Immunity Challenge: In pairs, each team unhooked ten hanging pieces to finish building a bridge. Once they built their bridge they fetched balls to give them to the pitcher. To score a point, the pitcher stood on a beam and threw the balls onto the rails so that they rolled into the basket. The Eagles won the challenge.; Honor Challenge: One teammate, blindfolded and guided by their partner, had to grab the flag attached to their opponent's back. The first person to raise their opponent's flag and lift their hand won a point. After scoring three points, the Panthers won the challenge.; At the Trial, the Panthers nominated Monse for elimination, while the Sharks nominated Gisella and Cristina.
28	"Dura realidad"	August 30, 2024
Surprise Challenge: In a relay game, one teammate took balls one by one and handed them over to their teammate who was tied up to a harness. This teammate passed the balls to the third teammate who placed them in the container. Afterwards, the teammates with the harness used a net to pitch the balls into the basket at the top of a tower. The Eagles won the challenge and each member received a weekend trip to Paris.; Territory Revenge Challenge: In pairs, each team began the challenge by crossing a hanging bridge until reaching the barrels. They rolled the barrels across the line and one teammate stood behind a wall and try to memorize the pattern of twelve figures. Afterwards, the pairs arranged their barrels on the shelf following the pattern from the wall. The Sharks won the challenge and moved to High Beach, sending the Panthers to Medium Beach. The Eagles came in third place and remained in Low Beach.
29	"Se encienden nuevamente"	September 1, 2024
Power Challenge: The contestants stood on beams and balanced a wooden ball over a semicircle. Throughout the challenge they received instructions on the movements they needed to do on the beams. Alba won the challenge.; Reward Challenge: The teams competed for a meal at a restaurant in Kalkan and shopping trip in Kaş. In pairs, the teams transported a cart loaded with geometric shapes across the walkway to the other side of the course. They arranged the pieces so they could pass without getting stuck or falling through the grooved walls. At the end of the course, the pairs placed cubes on a balance sale and balanced them for five seconds. The Eagles won the challenge and invited Alba, Monse and Valeria of the Panthers to their trip for coming in second place.
30	"¿A quién protegerá?"	September 2, 2024
Immunity Challenge: Three teammates must transport a metal container through the course with a mast. Along the way they unhooked three triangles from one arc and hung them on the second arc. At the end of the course, the team pitcher stood on a platform and dunked balls into the metal container. The Sharks won the challenge after scoring three points.; Honor Challenge: In pairs, teammates walked through the course facing each other and connected by two ski-boards. They collected small buckets on the tables throughout the course and used them to build a pyramid. The Eagles won the challenge.; At the Trial, the Eagles nominated Sergio for elimination, while the Panthers nominated Valeria and Awilda. Alba used her Power Bracelet to save Awilda from the Elimination Challenge.: Elimination Challenge: The nominees carried a ball along a rope path and placed it inside a duct at the end of the course. To transport the ball, they used acrylic tubes distributed at four stations along the course. The first four nominees to score three balls were safe. Gisella came in last place and was eliminated from the competition.
Week 6: Antalya
31	"Por el último símbolo"	September 3, 2024
Mission Challenge: In pairs, the teams were quizzed about Turkey and events that happened during the competition. The Sharks had the most correct answers and won the last symbol. With only one symbol earned, the Eagles team was dissolved and its remaining members were absorbed by the other teams. Viviana and Uriel were chosen by the Sharks to join their team, while Sebastián and Sergio were picked by the Panthers. Angélica had the choice on which team to join and she picked the Panthers.; Territorial Challenge: The teams transported balls over a balance beam using a wooden board. At the end of the course, teammates filled buckets with water and used the water to knock down the eight balls resting on two barrels. The Sharks won the right to stay at High Beach, while the Panthers were sent to Low Beach.; Captains' Battle: Team captains Cristina and Valeria received a diagram of a sequence and had a minute to memorize it. Once on the course, they faced a series of tiles that were flipped over and had to reveal, row by row, the location of the red titles that allowed them to advance. Cristina scored two points and won the challenge for the Sharks.
32	"Aunque ya no existen"	September 4, 2024
Punishment Challenge: One teammate was on top of a tower while two other teammates pass them two bags of balls. The teammate to top slid four balls down a pipe while the others took turns and went across the path in zig-zag to reach the end of the line at the same time the ball did so they could catch it. After collecting the balls, teams threw them at a hanging triangle and stabilize all three sides. The Sharks won the challenge and avoided the punishment of being tied up to each other. Cristina decided to punish Adolfo, Awilda, Sergio and Valeria.; Adventure Challenge: In pairs, teams went through the course tied to a harness. In the balance beam zone, the teams used a hook to connect rails in order to advance and collect keys to unlock a bag with balls. Using a bridge controlled by levers, the teams had to dunk two balls into their basket to earn a point. The Sharks won the challenge and were able to go paragliding.
33	"¡Pagando las consecuencias!"	September 5, 2024
Sergio reveals that he will be temporarily leaving the competition to face a legal commitment in Mexico City. Javier informs him that if he does not return as soon as possible he will be automatically disqualified from the game.: Women's Immunity Challenge: In pairs, the teams began the course by crossing a rope and passed through a ramp, took a ball from the basket, and carried it over a plank with holes, preventing it from falling. At the end of the course, the teams must let the ball fall down a transparent tube and into their basket. The Sharks won the challenge.; Men's Immunity Challenge: One teammate collected cubes for their partner and upon receiving the cubes the other teammate placed it on the board to put together four cubes of the same color, avoiding their opponent's blocks. The Panthers won the challenge.; At the Trial, the Panthers nominated Angélica for elimination, while the Sharks nominated Uriel.
34	"Recompensa sin precio"	September 6, 2024
Javier informs the contestants that on doctor's recommendation, Samira must leave the competition.: Surprise Challenge: The teams competed to receive a video message from home. Two teammates walked through various obstacles and collected three cylinders and two prisms so a third teammate could place them on a table. Using elastic bands, all teammates transported their pieces to the final platform of the course, where they stacked them to build a tower. The Sharks won the challenge.; Territory Revenge Challenge: Three teammates transported three cylinders through the course. After facing the obstacles, they placed their cylinders in the marked area to build four baskets. The team shooter rolled balls down a slide aiming to land one in each of the four baskets. The Panthers won the challenge and took over High Beach, while the Sharks were sent to Low Beach.
35	"Fuerza o fortaleza"	September 8, 2024
Power Challenge: The contestants went through the course by walking on stilts. At the first arc, they moved forward by pushing their ring throughout the rope until the end mark. In the second arc, they removed their stilts and used square pieces to build a tower. Adolfo won the challenge.; Reward Challenge: The teams competed for the chance to visit a nightlife spot in Antalya. Two members per team faced each other on a platform in the middle of the sea where they pushed each other with cushions and tried to knock their opponents into the water. The Sharks won the challenge.
36	"Irreversible"	September 9, 2024
Men's Immunity Challenge: In pairs, teams began the challenge by carrying a ball with two tightened ropes and dropping it in their basket. Afterwards, they untangled ropes in front of the gates so they would fall down and advance to the next stage. At the end of the course, they placed four balls, using tightened ropes, on the marked holes in the plank. The Panthers won the challenge.; Women's Immunity Challenge: Two teammates moved throughout the course jumping from ramp to ramp without touching the floor. After reaching the net cage, they moved balls and sandbags to take them out and collect them in a basket. They transported their balls and handed them over to their third teammate who was suspended in the air. This teammate had to dunk three balls into a basket to earn a point. The Sharks won the Challenge.; At the Trial, the Panthers nominated Awilda for elimination, while the Sharks nominated Chuy. Adolfo used his Power Bracelet to save Awilda from the Elimination Challenge.: Elimination Challenge: The nominees were blindfolded and needed to remember a layout of geometric figures on a table, then replicate it on a different table, ensuring it was mirrored in both orientation and placement as the original layout. Chuy was eliminated from the competition.
Week 7: Isparta
37	"¿Quién se va?"	September 10, 2024
Javier informs the contestants that Sergio will not be returning to the competition.: Territorial Challenge: Two teammates went through a crawl pit, pulled a rope to free a metal sphere, and carried it until reaching the wall. They passed the sphere over the wall and took it to the launch tower where the pitcher slid the sphere down a ramp and knocked down pins at the end of the course. The Sharks won the keys to High Beach, while the Panthers were sent to Low Beach.; Javier reveals that Team Captains will no longer be selected through a voting process. Instead, members from the same team will face off against one another in a competition to decide who becomes the Captain. The Captain will then be granted immunity for the entire week.: Total Immunity Challenge: In the first stage, contestants crossed the course blindfolded with the help of a guiding rope. Afterwards, contestants built a puzzle and raised their flag. In the final stage, they climbed a tower and used a hook to catch four rectangles to balance them on a beam. Adolfo and Viviana won the competition.; Captains' Battle: Adolfo and Viviana collected 17 pieces found around the course and used them to build a tower and keep it standing for five seconds. Adolfo won the challenge.
38	"¡Atrapados entre las algas!"	September 11, 2024
Punishment Challenge: Teams loaded cargo onto a wagon on a rail and one contestant pushed the wagon while the other two connected the tracks to move the wagon throughout the course. Afterwards, they used the cargo to build a giant cube with the structure found in the middle of the course. At the end of the course, a contestant entered a cage while their teammates swung the cage to reach the final line and stick six flags in place. The Sharks won the challenge and avoided the punishment of spending the day cleaning seaweed on the Eğirdir lake shore. Viviana decided to punish Adolfo, Alba and Hubert.; Adventure Challenge: Two teammates carried and balanced a ball on a triangular board with holes while avoiding obstacles around the course. At various checkpoints they collected additional balls to add to their board. Afterwards, they shot each of the balls into the basket using an irregularly shaped wood. The Sharks won the challenge.
39	"En la cuerda floja"	September 12, 2024
Women's Immunity Challenge: Four teammates began the challenge by collecting two ropes, used it to assemble a suspension bridge and crossed it. Once reaching the final frame, they untangled the totem and took it with them to the end of the course where they placed it on a circular base and hooked it to the four ropes. Each teammate lifted the base by pulling on each end until hanging it at the top. The Panthers won the challenge.; Men's Immunity Challenge: One member from each team was tied by a harness to a log and from each end of the log, they pushed to force the other back and out of the course. The Sharks won the challenge.; At the Trial, the Panthers nominated Sebastián for elimination, while the Sharks nominated Cristina.
40	"¡Una inyección de fuerza!"	September 13, 2024
Territory Revenge Challenge: In pairs, teams began the challenge by climbing a tower to retrieve a box. They placed the box at the entrance of a tunnel and, with the help of metal rods, they guided it through the obstacles until it fell down the other side. Afterwards, they collected four more cubes and took them to the base of the tower to build stairs, climb them, and solve a puzzle. The Panthers won the challenge and moved to High Beach, while the Sharks were sent to Low Beach.; Sentencing Challenge: Standing on the starting platform, three teammates faced various obstacles to transport four logs through the course. At the end of the course, there were a series of wooden cylinders with colored ends which the teams had to arrange around the perimeter of the wooden structure so that the ends matched by color. The Sharks won the challenge sent Hubert directly to the Elimination Challenge.
41	"Un beneficio con sorpresas"	September 15, 2024
Power Challenge: The contestants rolled a barrel until reaching the slide, where they collected a bag with two pieces of wood. Using the barrel as a step, they slipped their bag to the other side. They went under a crawling pit and picked up two more pieces of wood. At the final structure, they put the four pieces of wood on a beam, untangled a rope and used it to knock down their wooden pieces. Adrián won the challenge.; Reward Challenge: The teams competed to receive a spa day. Four teammates, paired up, used a cloth to launch balls provided by a fifth teammate. The ball had to be launched from one cloth to the other so the teammate could catch it and place it in their basket. Once the basket was filled it raised a platform with a hammer underneath. The teams used the hammer to break open a box containing five keys. They used the keys to unlock five padlocks at the top of a ramp, which caused a container to tip over and spill sand onto their opponents side of the ramp. The Sharks won the challenge.
42	"Con la soga al cuello"	September 16, 2024
Immunity Challenge #1: Teams began the challenge collecting puzzle pieces around the course. Upon reaching the slide, they placed each piece by fitting them using a bamboo stick. When adding new pieces, the first one went up the slide and fell down. The Sharks won the challenge.; Immunity Challenge #2: A teammate got inside a hamster wheel and rolled while two teammates moved them around. After going through obstacles, the teammate inside the hamster wheel climbed on top of the wheel and unhooked a hanging bag. In the second post they pushed both balls with a stick to get them out of the net. They collected a second bag and at the end of the course one teammate pitched balls to dunk them in their basket. The Panthers won the challenge.; At the Trial, the Panthers nominated Awilda for elimination, while the Sharks nominated Tony. Adrián used his Power Bracelet to save Tony from the Elimination Challenge.: Elimination Challenge: The nominees used a special gripper to hold a piece of wood in the air and over a ceramic tile. The nominee who dropped their piece of wood first and break their tile was eliminated. Sebastián lost the challenge.
Week 8: Isparta
43	"Unión o traición"	September 17, 2024
44	"¿Quién se salvará?"	September 18, 2024
45	"Enemigos ocultos"	September 19, 2024
46	"Hubert en peligro"	September 20, 2024
47	"Contra viento y marea"	September 22, 2024
48	"Quedarán sin palabras"	September 23, 2024
Week 9: Çanakkale
49	"Terror en el mar"	September 24, 2024
50	"No apto para cardíacos"	September 25, 2024
51	"¡Se calienta la olla!"	September 26, 2024
52	"¿Podrá sobrevivir?"	September 27, 2024
53	"Callejón sin salida"	September 29, 2024
54	"Decisión dolorosa"	September 30, 2024
Week 10: Çanakkale
55	"Al borde del desespero"	October 1, 2024
56	"Directo a la yugular"	October 2, 2024
57	"Muy preocupante"	October 3, 2024
58	"El blanco perfecto"	October 4, 2024
59	"¿Mito o realidad?"	October 6, 2024
60	"El último encuentro"	October 7, 2024
Week 11: Istanbul
61	"¡Sálvese quien pueda!"	October 8, 2024
Immunity Challenge #1: The contestants collected four balls found on the course and carried them using a wooden wristband. Upon reaching the shooting area, they threw the balls up the ramp to get them to stop in the net. Adrián won the challenge and received an extra $5,000.; Immunity Challenge #2: Chained by hand and foot, the contestants removed cylinders blocking the bridge to cross. When they arrived at the column of numbers, they memorized the order of the numbers and replicated them on the beam to advance to the shooting zone. Once there, they unleashed their hands to stand up five rectangular figures, hooking them with a bamboo cane. Hubert won the challenge and received an extra $5,000.; Javier revealed that the Trial Vote would no longer be to nominate a contestant, but to save a third person from the elimination challenge. Natalia received the most votes and was safe from elimination.: Elimination Challenge: The nominees placed a wooden cube on a support base attached to a stick, which they held with one hand. When instructed to do so, they added an extension to the stick, keeping the figure balanced on its base. Awilda dropped her cube first and was eliminated.
62	"Olla de presión"	October 9, 2024
Immunity Challenge #1: The contestants began the course tied at the waist with a rope. They followed the path of the rope making the necessary movements to untangle themselves. Upon reaching the tower, they used logs to complete a ladder and climbed up. From the tower they threw hoops and had to score three on the pipe that is at ground level. Adrián won the challenge and received an extra $5,000.; Immunity Challenge #2: The blindfolded contestants passed under a rope area and continued moving forward to retrieve a bag of stakes hanging from a pole. At the end of the course, they placed their two stakes in the small holes in the panel, recognizing the surface only through the wooden pieces without using their hands to feel. Hubert won the challenge and received an extra $5,000.; At the Trial, Uriel received the most votes and safe was safe from elimination.: Elimination Challenge: Using only one hand, the nominees held a hanging board by the handle and with the other hand they placed two balls on each of the lines on its surface for a total of eight, keeping them in balance. Alba came in last place and was eliminated.
63	"¡En el ojo de huracán!"	October 10, 2024
Immunity Challenge #1: The contestants took a metal bar and advanced through the course trying not to drop the spheres at each end of the bar. They took the spheres and threw them to the inclined board and made them find their way through the chute until they reached the basket. Guty won the challenge and received an extra $5,000.; Immunity Challenge #2: The contestants began by placing two spheres in a bottomless bowl and carried it through the course while collecting three more spheres along the way. At the end of the course they had to push three rope rings over the ramp to hook them into the stake at the top. Uriel won the challenge and received an extra $5,000.; At the Trial, Natalia received the most votes and was safe from elimination.: Elimination Challenge: Standing on a rocking platform, the nominees built a tower of five cubes at the other end of the platform, keeping their balance with the help of the rope. Once their tower was built, they had to stand behind the marked line on the rocking platform and raise their hand. Viviana came in last place and was eliminated.
64	"El destierro de una gigante"	October 11, 2024
65	"¡No hay mañana!"	October 13, 2024
66	"Un final de película"	October 14, 2024

== Reception ==
The season premiered with a total of 1.30 million viewers. The finale received 0.96 million viewers.
