= Adrián Di Monte =

Cuban actor and singer

- Born: July 31, 1990 (age 36); Santa Clara, Cuba
- Occupations: Actor, singer
- Years active: 2010–present
- Partner: Sandra Itzel (2013-2023)

Adrián Di Monte (born July 31, 1990) is a Cuban television actor and singer.

== Life and career ==
Adrián Di Monte was born in Santa Clara, Cuba. He started his acting career in 2010 with a role in the Univision telenovela, Eva Luna. He later appeared in another telenovela of Telemundo called Aurora, and then in Mi corazón insiste en Lola Volcán, and in 2013 was cast in the recurring role in the Univision telenovela Rosario, playing Ignacio "Nacho" Gómez. In 2014, he appeared on Cosita linda and Voltea pa' que te enamores, an American remake of the Venezuelan telenovelas Cosita rica and Voltea pa' que te enamores. In 2015, he appeared on ¿Quién es quién?, playing Eugenio Hernández. In 2016, he was part of the recurring cast of the series Señora Acero, also known as Señora Acero: La Coyote, playing Abelardo Casáres.

== Filmography ==
Television roles
Year	Title	Roles	Notes
2010	Eva Luna	Humberto	Main cast
2010	Aurora	Unknown Man	Episode: "Gran lanzamiento"
2011	Mi corazón insiste en Lola Volcán	Papi	4 episodes
2013	Rosario	Ignacio "Nacho" Gómez	Main cast
2014	Cosita linda	Santiago Rincón	Main cast
2014	Voltea pa' que te enamores	Armando	
2015–2016	¿Quién es quién?	Eugenio Hernández	Main cast; 89 episodes
2016	Señora Acero	Abelardo Casáres	Recurring role (season 3); 47 episodes
2017	La doble vida de Estela Carrillo	Joe	Main cast; 68 episodes
2017	Bailando por un sueño	Himself	Winner (season 4)
2018	Pequeños Gigantes	Himself	Judge (season 3)
2018	Reto 4 elementos	Himself	Winner (season 2)
2019	Esta historia me suena	Guillermo	Episode: Regálame
2019	Cita a ciegas	Roberto "Bobby" Silva Esquivel	Main cast
2021	Diseñando tu amor	Leonardo	Main cast
2022	La madrastra	Álvaro	Main cast
2023	El maleficio	Jorge	Main cast
2024	La isla: desafío extremo	Himself	Winner (season 1)
2025	La casa de los famosos México	Himself	Housemate (season 3)
