= El Super =

- Directed by: Leon Ichaso; Orlando Jiménez Leal
- Written by: Manuel Arce; Leon Ichaso
- Produced by: Manuel Arce; Leon Ichaso
- Starring: Raimundo Hidalgo-Gato; Zully Montero; Reynaldo Medina; Elizabeth Peña
- Music by: Enrique Ubieta
- Release date: April 29, 1979
- Running time: 90 minutes
- Country: United States
- Languages: Spanish; English

El Súper is a 1979 Spanish-language comedy-drama film directed by Leon Ichaso and Orlando Jiménez Leal, based on a stage play by Iván Acosta. The film is a look at life in the U.S. from the perspective of frustrated Cuban exiles.

== Plot summary ==
Roberto and Aurelia are ten-year exiles from Castro's Cuba, now residing in New York City with their 17-year-old daughter Aurelita. Roberto has become the super of the building in which he lives, with the troubles of his tenants and his overall discontentment with his current living situation driving the plot of the film. He and his wife have trouble understanding their daughter, who smokes pot and likes to disco dance; this is further compounded by the problems she gets into during the latter half of the film, including a pregnancy scare with potentially multiple men.

Roberto spends the majority of the film conversing with other exiles, such as Pancho, a fellow Cuban, and Cuco, an exile from Puerto Rico; he also tries to find a way to move to Miami to escape from New York, as he feels that, despite the escape from Cuba, that this was a waste of his past ten years and seeks to live out the remainder of his life in peace. After Roberto makes his wish come true by finding a factory job in the area, he celebrates both his wife's birthday and the family's moving out with a grand party; the ending of the film has Roberto desperately laughing in the dim basement, playing further into the isolation he's felt in the past decade.

== Reception ==
El Super received positive critical attention for its realistic portrayal of Cuban exile life in the United States. Critics particularly noted its observational style and emphasis on everyday experience rather than conventional plot structure. In a contemporary review for The Washington Post, K. C. Summers described the film as offering a “humorously realistic look at the day-to-day problems of an expatriate,” while also noting its technical limitations. Despite these constraints, Summers emphasized that “quality acting and a message of tolerance and survival comes through.” Critics have also highlighted the film’s episodic structure. A review cited by Rotten Tomatoes noted that the film “does not proceed along a set story line,” but instead is “constructed of a series of realistic and endearing vignettes.” The performances were widely praised, particularly that of Raimundo Hidalgo-Gato in the lead role. According to a Washington Post review by Gary Arnold, the actor delivers “the subtlest performance,” supported by a consistently strong cast. Later critical assessments have emphasized the film’s authenticity and cultural significance. A retrospective consensus highlights its ability to portray exile not as spectacle but as lived experience, capturing themes of nostalgia, frustration, and generational conflict within immigrant families. The film holds a high approval rating among critics, reflecting its enduring reputation as an important early work in Cuban-American and Latino independent cinema.

== Cast ==
- Raimundo Hidalgo-Gato as "El Super"
- Zully Montero as Aurelia
- Elizabeth Peña as Aurelita
- Reynaldo Medina as Pancho
- Juan Granda as Cuco
- Hilda Lee as La China
- Phil Joint as Inspector
- Jaime Soriano as Preacher
