= Amor Comprado =

Spanish language television series

- Genre: Telenovela
- Written by: Verónica Suárez
- Directed by: Yaky Ortega; Tito Rojas; María Eugenia Perera
- Starring: Elizabeth Gutiérrez; José Ángel Llamas; Marjorie de Sousa; Zully Montero
- Opening theme: "Puede Ser" by Grupo Ashta
- Ending theme: "Puede Ser" by Grupo Ashta
- Countries of origin: United States; Venezuela
- Original language: Spanish
- No. of episodes: 123

Production
- Producers: Peter Tinoco; Ana Teresa Arismendi; Arquímedes Rivero; Dulce Terán
- Production locations: Miami, Florida, US
- Running time: 45 minutes
- Production company: Venevisión International

Original release
- Network: Univision
- Release: January 21 – July 8, 2008

Related
- Catalina y Sebastián (1999)

Amor Comprado (English title: Love Contract, literal translation: purchased love, love for sale) is a telenovela written by Verónica Suárez and produced in Miami, Florida by Venevisión International in 2007.

Elizabeth Gutiérrez and José Ángel Llamas starred as the protagonists with Marjorie de Sousa, Zully Montero and Patricia Álvarez as the antagonists.

Univision began airing Amor Comprado at 1PM/12C, replacing Nunca Te Diré Adiós. It began airing in Venezuela on October 29, 2008, via Venevisión Plus at 10:00pm with repeats Monday to Saturday at 1:00pm.

== Plot ==
Young playboy Willy de la Fuente is in a bind. If he doesn't marry by his rapidly approaching 30th birthday, he'll lose his inheritance—something his mean-spirited grandmother Gertrudis is looking forward to. Despite this, he's not interested in marriage because he believes—thanks to his grandmother's constant attacks on his own self-esteem—that women aren't interested in him for anything else but his money.

Mariana's father is imprisoned after accidentally killing a young man who attempted to rape her. She seeks money to hire a lawyer for his defense. Her situation becomes more urgent after her father, who is recovering from a severe beating, remains at risk while in prison.

Willy finally decides to "audition" his next wife. He puts an ad in the paper searching for a wife—much to Gertrudis' consternation. He then meets Mariana, and they hit it off—at least until he discovers that she only married him for the money, which she will not get if she doesn't remain married to him.

Eventually, the two of them really do fall in love, but Gertrudis will go to any length to tear them apart. Willy's pain is her pleasure.

== Cast ==
- Elizabeth Gutiérrez as Mariana Gómez
- José Ángel Llamas as Guillermo "Willy" Cantú de la Fuente
- Marjorie de Sousa as Margot Salinas
- Zully Montero as Gertrudis De La Fuente
- José Bardina as Luciano De La Fuente
- Anna Silvetti as Morgana De La Fuente
- Roberto Mateos as Arturo Garibay
- Karen Senties as Leonora Gómez
- Patricia Alvarez as Natalia
- Julian Gil as Esteban Rondero
- Brianda Riquer as Juliana
- Fernando Carrera as Valentín
- Nelida Ponce as Matilda
- Reynaldo Cruz as Ernesto
- Isabel Moreno as Rosa
- Carlos Garin as Lcdo. Gutiérrez
- Franklin Virgüez as Saladino
- Laura Ferretti as Teresa
- Graciela Doring as Panchita
- Andrés García Jr. as Santiago
- Raul Olivo as Enrique
- Bobby Larios as Hilario
- Adrian Carvajal as Ricardo
- Marianne Lovera as Elena
- Marisela Buitrago as Lisette
- Carlos Augusto Maldonado as Martin
- Julio Capote as Jeremias
- Liannet Borrego as Veronica
- Yami Quintero as Renata
- Ernesto Molina as detective
