= La isla: desafío extremo season 2 =

Reality show season

La isla: desafío extremo
- Season 2
- Hosted by: Héctor Suárez Gomís
- No. of contestants: 18
- Winner: Gary Centeno
- Runner-up: Martín Salvador
- Location: Dominican Republic
- No. of episodes: 46

Release
- Original network: Telemundo
- Original release: October 7 – December 1, 2025

Season chronology
- ← Previous; Season 1

The second season of the American competitive reality television series La isla: desafío extremo premiered on October 7, 2025, on Telemundo. The season features 18 contestants divided into three teams. The season is filmed in the Dominican Republic. Javier Poza did not return as host and was replaced by Héctor Suárez Gomís. The season ended on December 1, 2025, when Gary Centeno was crowned the winner.

== Format ==
The season places a group of celebrities, reality TV stars and civilians in an isolated location in the Dominican Republic, where they are divided into three teams. Each week, teams compete for their living conditions, either High Beach with all amenities, Medium Beach with some amenities or Low Beach with no amenities at all. In addition, they will compete for leadership, immunity and rewards. The contestants are progressively eliminated from the game as they are voted out by their fellow contestants. The last contestant standing wins the grand prize of $200,000.

== Contestants ==
18 contestants will be selected to compete. The first group was announced on September 15, 2025. The second group was announced on September 18, 2025. The third group was announced on September 22, 2025.

Contestant	Age	Occupation	Team			Finish	
Contestant	Age	Occupation	Original	Absorbed	Merged	Placement	Episode
Zoraida Gómez	40	Actress	Eagles			1st Eliminated	6
Elizabeth Gutiérrez	46	Actress	Panthers			2nd Eliminated	12
Fernanda Flores	27	TV personality	Sharks			3rd Eliminated	17
Ximena Herrera	46	Actress	Sharks			4th Eliminated	23
Helen Ochoa	40	Singer	Sharks	Panthers		Quit (Injury)	27
Moi Guiquita	28	Activist and content creator	Eagles	Eagles		5th Eliminated	29
Christian de la Campa	43	Actor	Panthers	Panthers		Quit (Injury)	32
Julieta Grajales	39	Actress	Eagles	Eagles		6th Eliminated	35
Roberto Alejandro	36	Dancer and model	Panthers	Panthers		7th Eliminated	40
Mauricio Islas	52	Actor	Eagles	Eagles	Merged	8th Eliminated	41
José María Galeano	45	Actor	Sharks	Eagles	Merged	9th Eliminated	42
Rodrigo Mata	22	Entrepreneur and paramedic	Sharks	Panthers	Merged	10th Eliminated	43
Paulina Araujo	24	Athlete	Eagles	Eagles	Merged	11th Eliminated	44
Nievelis González	27	TV personality and model	Panthers	Panthers	Merged	12th Eliminated	45
Estefanía Ahumada	34	Actress and TV host	Panthers	Panthers	Merged	4th Place	46
Jason Romo	25	Actor	Eagles	Eagles	Merged	3rd Place	46
Martín Salvador	32	Personal trainer and entrepreneur	Sharks	Eagles	Merged	Runner-up	46
Gary Centeno	36	Actor	Panthers	Panthers	Merged	Winner	46

== Production ==
The season was announced on May 8, 2025. Casting for the season started in June 2025. On August 28, 2025, it was announced that Héctor Suárez Gomís would replace Javier Poza as host of the series.

== Episodes ==
No. overall	No. in season	Title	Original release date
67	1	"Arranca la competencia sin tregua"	October 7, 2025
68	2	"Castigo en puerta"	October 8, 2025
69	3	"Se dicta la sentencia"	October 9, 2025
70	4	"Quieren un cambio a gritos"	October 10, 2025
71	5	"Por equivocación"	October 12, 2025
72	6	"Pelea por la comida"	October 13, 2025
73	7	"El portal a los sueños"	October 14, 2025
74	8	"Privados de la vista"	October 15, 2025
75	9	"Roces entre Panteras"	October 16, 2025
76	10	"Jaque al alma"	October 17, 2025
77	11	"Aquí, la fuerza no basta"	October 19, 2025
78	12	"Pelea inevitable"	October 20, 2025
79	13	"Movida preocupante"	October 21, 2025
80	14	"La guerra no da tregua"	October 22, 2025
81	15	"Un reto verdadero de salvación"	October 24, 2025
82	16	"Fuerte revelación"	October 26, 2025
83	17	"Rumores de traición"	October 27, 2025
84	18	"La supervivencia es lo que cuenta"	October 28, 2025
85	19	"¿Represalias?"	October 29, 2025
86	20	"La inmunidad no los rescata"	October 30, 2025
87	21	"El corazón detrás del guerrero"	October 31, 2025
88	22	"¡Fuertes comentarios!"	November 2, 2025
89	23	"¡Conflicto feroz!"	November 3, 2025
90	24	"Extinción anunciada"	November 4, 2025
91	25	"Proceso de adaptación"	November 5, 2025
92	26	"Confusión"	November 6, 2025
93	27	"Una sorpresa, un adiós"	November 7, 2025
94	28	"Emociones en llamas"	November 9, 2025
95	29	"Sin retorno"	November 10, 2025
96	30	"Muestran los colmillos"	November 11, 2025
97	31	"¡Estrategia peligrosa!"	November 12, 2025
98	32	"Hierve la tierra"	November 13, 2025
99	33	"Guerra frontal"	November 14, 2025
100	34	"Corazones en jaque"	November 16, 2025
101	35	"Visita en medio de la tormenta"	November 17, 2025
102	36	"Quieren sacarlos de su hábitat"	November 18, 2025
103	37	"¡Por última vez!"	November 19, 2025
104	38	"El final se acerca"	November 21, 2025
105	39	"Esta no es cualquier prueba"	November 23, 2025
106	40	"¡Hasta aquí!"	November 24, 2025
107	41	"Se desata la tormenta"	November 25, 2025
108	42	"A un paso del desespero"	November 26, 2025
109	43	"Desenlace en puertas"	November 27, 2025
110	44	"La única opción para salvarse"	November 28, 2025
111	45	"Doscientos mil dólares al horno"	November 30, 2025
112	46	"¡Se acabó!"	December 1, 2025
