= Zully Montero =

Cuban actress (born 1944)

Clara Zully Montero
- Born: January 25, 1944 (age 82); Santo Suarez, Cuba
- Other names: Zully Montero
- Occupation: Actress
- Years active: 1979-2013

Clara Zully Montero (Spanish pronunciation: [ˈklaɾa ˈsuli monˈteɾo]; born January 25, 1944) is a Cuban actress who has worked in television, film, and theatre.

== Biography ==
Montero was born in Santo Suarez, Cuba. At the age of 11, Montero gathered a group of friends and created her own plays, which were presented to family and friends. Her mother noticed her interest in performing, and placed her in La Academia De Arte Dramatico De La Habana (School of Dramatic Arts in Havana, Cuba). When she graduated from school, she participated in a radio talent contest, which was searching for an actress to participate in a radio soap opera. She won the contest and was featured on the show. After the radio soap opera, she went on to do some theater. At the age of 16, she placed her acting career on hold to get married, and gave birth to two daughters, Martha and Elaine. Her life in Cuba was very difficult, and the lack of liberty led to her decision to leave Cuba.

Montero and her husband moved to her uncle-in-law's home in New York, United States, and they worked to provide food and shelter for their family. She worked in a shoe factory, a post card factory, and in clothing factories. During this time, she became pregnant with her third child, Jezabel Montero. Then she decided to study English and take typing classes. She got a job in an import/export company near Wall Street in New York City. There, she bumped into an old friend with whom she had done theater in Cuba. He invited her to his theater group, where she began acting again. Her husband did not approve her acting, and this led to their divorce. She had to work two jobs to maintain her family, but continued working in the theater. There, she began expanding her acting career from theater to television. In 1979, she played Aurelia in the movie "El Super". Then in 1990, she appeared in her first on-screen soap opera, "El Magnate".

== Filmography ==
- El Super (1979) .... Aurelia
- El magnate (1990, TV Series) .... Antonia
- Corte Tropical (1990, TV Series) .... Gloria
- Cape Fear (1991) .... Graciella
- Marielena (1992, TV Series) .... Claudia Sandoval
- Guadalupe (1993, TV Series) .... Luisa Zambrano de Maldonado / Marquesa de Covadonga
- Señora Tentacion (1995, TV Series) .... Marlene
- Aguamarina (1997, TV Series) .... Doña Augusta Calatrava
- Maria Celina (1998, TV Series) .... Isaura Quintero
- Cosas Del Amor (1998, TV Series) .... Mercedes Castro-Iglesias V. de Maticorena
- Me Muero Por Ti (1999, TV Series) .... Margot Hidalgo
- Estrellita (2000, TV Series) .... Ruth Johnson
- A 2.50 La Cuba Libre (2001) .... Doris La Caimana
- Vale Todo (2002, TV Series) .... Lucrecia Roitman-Villain
- El Dulce Pajaro De La Juventud (2003) .... La Princesa Kosmonopolis
- El Huevo Del Gallo (2003) .... Elsa
- A Cuban Christmas Carol (2003) .... Ghost Of Christmas Past
- Prisionera (2004, TV Series) .... Rosalia Riobueno Viuda De Moncada
- Alborada (2005, TV Series) .... Adelaida De Guzman
- Los Proceres (2005) .... Amelia Cisneros
- La Virgen De Coromoto (2006) .... Maria Consuelo
- Full Grown Men (2006) .... Teya
- El Hombre Que Vino Del Mar (2006) .... Claudia
- La viuda de Blanco (2006, TV Series) .... Perfecta Albarracin Viuda De Blanco
- O.K. (2007) .... Milly
- Amor Comprado (2007, TV Series) .... Gertrudis De La Fuente-Villain
- El Rostro de Analía (2008, TV Series) .... Carmen Rodriguez De Andrade-Main villain
- Perro amor (2010, TV Series) .... Cecilia Brando
- El fantasma de Elena (2010, TV Series) .... Margot Uzcátegui, Ruth Marchan (La Reina)
- Aurora (2011, TV Series) .... Catalina Quintana
- Toc/Toc (2012) .... Maria
- Rosario (2012–2013, TV Series) .... Regina Montalban
- Santa Diabla (2013, TV Series) .... Hortencia de Santana
- Cassanova Was a Woman (2016)
- Death of a Fool (2020) .... Irene
