= Fotonovela (film) =

- Directed by: Robert Kubilos
- Written by: Robert Kubilos
- Produced by: Chris Chanowski; Robert Kubilos
- Starring: Rafael Amaya; Elizabeth Gutiérrez
- Cinematography: Euripides Núñez
- Edited by: Pablo Moreno
- Release date: 16 September 2008 (USA)
- Running time: 90 min.
- Language: Spanish
- Budget: $150,000 (estimated)

Fotonovela is a 2008 Spanish-language comedy film directed by Robert Kubilos that was released in the autumn of 2008 (September 16). Its budget is estimated to $150,000. The movie was released on DVD at the same time. It lasts 90 minutes and it is produced under Maya Entertainment.

It stars Rafael Amaya, Elizabeth Gutiérrez and Veronica Diaz.

== Plot ==
Angel Guzman is a Mexican immigrant in the U.S. But, rather than seek work as a laborer, he dreams of fulfilling his artistic passions. When the aspiring young Angel wins a radio contest and becomes an intern to one of L.A.'s premiere photographers, he is convinced that this chance of a lifetime will jump start his career. But, on set, things prove to be more complicated! It turns out that he is not very welcomed by some of his colleagues and possibly too welcomed by some of the ladies. Angel struggles to please a tyrannical boss while dodging the flirtations and temptations of twelve super models. Comedy and romance ensue as Angel finds his place in the world of photography and in the heart of a special woman. At the end, he gets Melanie.

== Cast ==
- Rafael Amaya ... Angel
- Elizabeth Gutiérrez ... Melanie
- Veronica Diaz ... Isabel
- Robert Kubilos ... Claudio
- Richie Mestre ... Julio
- Rene Pereyra ... Paco
- Noelle Perris ... Olga
- Aida Rodriguez ... Ida
- Alex Ruiz ... Raul
- Rodrigo Vidal ... Charlie
- Angel Zermen ... Luis
