= Sin senos sí hay paraíso season 4 =

Sin senos sí hay paraíso
- Season 4
- Starring: Carmen Villalobos; Majida Issa; Catherine Siachoque; Gregorio Pernía
- No. of episodes: 5

Release
- Original network: Telemundo
- Original release: 16 November 2026 – present

Season chronology
- ← Previous; Season 3

The fourth season of Sin senos sí hay paraíso was announced on 25 January 2023. Written by Patricia Rodríguez Reyes, the season is directed by Mónica Botero and Carlos Cock Marín, with Amparo Gutiérrez, Mónica Albuquerque, Jacky Castro and Sergio Mendoza serving as executive producers. It premiered on 16 November 2026.

The season stars Carmen Villalobos, Majida Issa, Catherine Siachoque and Gregorio Pernía.

== Cast ==
=== Returning cast members ===
- Carmen Villalobos as Catalina Santana
- Majida Issa as Yésica Beltrán "La Diabla"
- Catherine Siachoque as Hilda Santana
- Gregorio Pernía as Aurelio "Titi" Jaramillo
- Fabián Ríos as Albeiro Marín
- Estefanía Gómez as Vanessa Salazar
- Carolina Gaitán as Catalina Marín

=== New cast members ===
- David Trejos as José Luis Vargas "Jota"
- Elizabeth Gutiérrez as Diva Montero
- Arturo Barba as Israel Montero
- Sergio Herrera as Camello
- Isabela Amado as Sasha
- Juan Zuluaga as León
- Osvaldo de León as José Antonio Bianchi
- Val Dorantes as Antonella Bianchi
- María Laura Quintero
- Giovanna Romo
- Yankel Stevan as Julián Montero
- Liliana González
- Izzi Rodríguez
- Juana Arboleda
- Nataly Cadavid
- Camila Taborda
- Pablo Astiazarán
- Sandra Zellweger
- Jerónimo Henao
- Adrián Makala

== Episodes ==
No. overall	No. in season	Title	Original release date
241	1	"Bajo fuego"	16 November 2026
242	2	"Rastro fallido"	17 November 2026
243	3	"Trampa y traición"	18 November 2026
244	4	"El precio de la paz"	19 November 2026
245	5	"Sacrificio"	20 November 2026

== Production ==
On 25 January 2023, Telemundo announced at their 2023 lineup presentation that the series had been renewed for a fourth season. After years of delays, filming for the season began on 13 January 2026.

On 18 April 2026, crew members Nicolás Francisco Perdomo Corrales and Henry Alberto Benavides Cárdenas were stabbed to death by Josué Cubillos García while on set in the Los Laches neighborhood in Bogota, Colombia. Cubillos García was subsequently lynched and died after suffering various injuries. Production was immediately suspended and resumed on 23 April 2026. Filming of the season concluded on 16 June 2026.
