= Arancha Solis =

Spanish actress

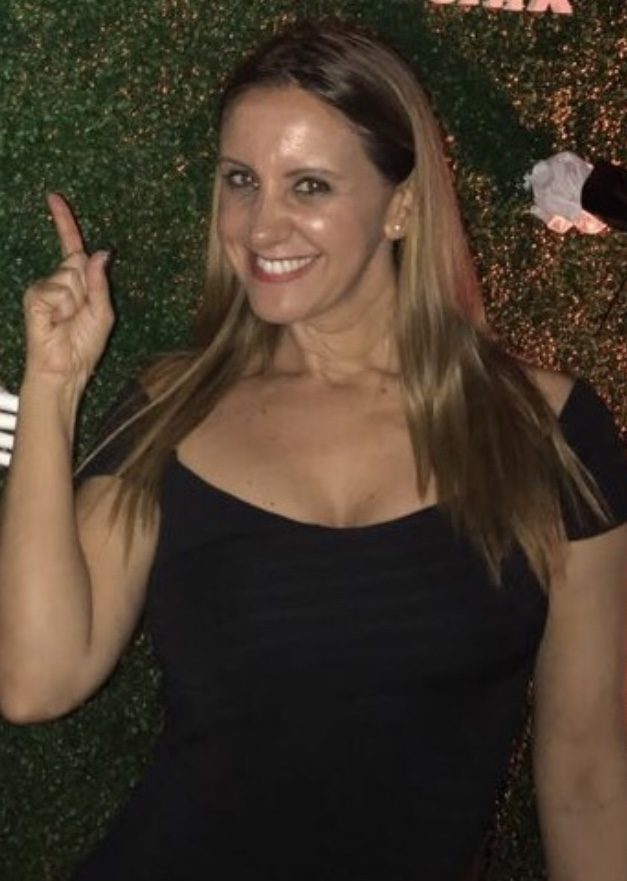
- Arancha at the Premier of Netflix in Mexico, 2017
- Born: María Aranzazu Solís Rodríguez; December 31, 1973 (age 51); Madrid, Spain
- Other names: Arancha del Toro
- Occupation: Actress
- Years active: 1999–present
- Spouse: Roberto Mateos

Arancha Solis (born December 31, 1973), also known as Arancha del Toro, is a Spanish film, television, and theater actress.

== Filmography ==
=== Films ===
Year	Title	Notes
2016	El Tatuaje	Gustavo bolivar
2015	El Justiciero 3	Cine Latino
2015	Las mujeres no callamos	Onu and Venevisión
2009	Piscolabis	Orange Bite
2005	Gran Slalom	Jaime Chavarri
2002	Las Cosas son como son	Jose A Pastor
2002	Insepulta	Metropolis
1999	Volaverunt	Bigas Luna
1997	La femme du cosmonaute	Biz Films and Mate Producciones S.A.
1996	Gran Slalom	Pedro Masó
1995	Hermana, ¿Pero que has hecho?	Pedro Masó
1995	El Seductor	Pedro Masó
1994	Hermana, ¿Pero que has hecho?	Pedro Masó

=== Television ===
Year	Title	Role	Notes
2024	Papá soltero 2.0	La Dire	Vix, Mexico - España
2024	La increíble historia de Julia Pastrana	Brenda	Disney, Mexico - España
2021	De Brutas Nada	Marta	Sony - Amazon, Mexico - Colombia
2021	Si nos dejan	La Dire	W studios - Televisa - Univision, Mexico
2019	Rubi	Ana	W studios - Lemon - Televisa, Mexico
2019	Los Elegidos	Cravan	Sony - Teleste - Televisa, Mexico
2018	Un Poquito tuyo	Irene Leon	ImagenTv - Telemundo, Miami - Mexico
2017	La Bandida	Eduviges	Sony Teleset Mexico
2016	Eva la Trailera	Nora Hernandez	Telemundo, Miami
2015	Dueños del Paraiso	Psiquiatra María	Telemundo, Miami
2014	Reina de corazones	Marta	Telemundo, Miami
1013	Marido en Alquiler	Mónica Ramos	Telemundo, Miami
2011	La Reina del Sur	Carmela	Telemundo and RTI, Colombia
2011	Sacrificio de Mujer	Lucha	Venevisión, Miami
2010	Eva Luna	Marielys	Venevisión, Miami
2010	Pecadora	Consuelo	Venevisión, Miami
2008	Valeria	Yolanda	Venevision, Miami
2003	Luna Negra	Ana	Venevisión, Miami
1998–2002	Compañeros	Laura	Factoría de Ficción Madrid
2000–2001	Hospital Central	Periodista Marta	Telecinco Madrid
1997–1998	Calle Nueva	Mimo	Tve 1 Madrid
1994	Compuesta y sin Novio	Mercedes	Pedro Masó Madrid

=== Theater ===
Year	Title	Notes
2016	¿Dónde está el punto?	Frog Productions, Miami
2015	Habitación 067	Frog Productions, Miami
2014	Malas	Mirku group, Miami
2014	Tres	Mirku Group, Miami
2014	Necrofilia Fina	CEE, Miami
2013	Celotipia	CEE, Miami
2013	Mi amante tu amante	Mirku group, Miami
2012	Yo te amo	Mirku Group, Miami
2012	La Hipoteca	CEE, Miami
2011	No la vuelvas a tocar Sam	CEE, Miami
2007	El último Cuplé	CEE, Miami
2007	Lady Macbeth, Shakespeare	Sala Triangle Madrid
2006	La Casa de Bernarda Alba	Martinez Group, Madrid
2006	Un tranvía llamado deseo	CEE, Miami
2005	El Mago de Oz	Alonso MillánMadrid
2001	Waiting for the parade	Mc Cadden Theater Los Ángeles
