= El Rostro de Analía =

- Theatrical release poster
- Created by: Humberto "Kiko" Olivieri
- Developed by: Telemundo Studios, Miami
- Written by: Humberto "Kiko" Olivieri, Isamar Hernandez, Carolina Diaz, Alejandro Vergara
- Directed by: David Posada; Danny Gavidia
- Starring: Elizabeth Gutiérrez; Martín Karpan; Maritza Rodríguez; Gabriel Porras; Karla Monroig; Zully Montero; Daniel Lugo; José Guillermo Cortines; Gaby Espino
- Theme music composer: Juan Carlos Rodriguez
- Opening theme: Doble Vida performed by Valerie Morales and Wahero
- Country of origin: United States
- Original language: Spanish
- No. of episodes: 178

Production
- Executive producer: Aurelio Valcárcel Carroll
- Producer: Jairo Arcila
- Production locations: Miami, Florida, Los Angeles, California
- Editor: Hader Antivar Duque
- Camera setup: Multi-camera
- Running time: 42-45 minutes

Original release
- Network: Telemundo
- Release: October 20, 2008 – July 16, 2009

Related
- El juramento; Niños ricos, pobres padres

El Rostro de Analía (Spanish pronunciation: [el ˈrostɾo ðe anaˈli.a]; The Face of Analía) is a Spanish-language telenovela produced by the American-based television network Telemundo. It stars Elizabeth Gutiérrez, Martín Karpan, Maritza Rodríguez and Gabriel Porras, with the special appearance of Gaby Espino. Written by Venezuelan writer Humberto "Kiko" Olivieri, the story is loosely based on María, María which starred Alba Roversi and Mexican soap star Arturo Peniche in Venezuela, and was also written by Olivieri. The novela is directed by David Posada and Danny Gaviria; with Jairo Arcila as General Producer and Aurelio Valcárcel Carroll as Executive Producer. Although the novela was set in Los Angeles, Telemundo filmed the serial in Miami, Fl. Through editing it was made to appear as Los Angeles. The network debuted it on October 20, 2008, at the 9 pm (8 pm central) timeslot. NBC added English subtitles as closed captions on CC3 starting in March.

Elizabeth Gutiérrez plays both Mariana and Analía, being the protagonist. The male lead is portrayed by Martín Karpan, while the antagonists include Maritza Rodríguez, Gabriel Porras and Zully Montero. Other major characters are brought to life by Karla Monroig, Daniel Lugo, José Guillermo Cortines, Ximena Duque, Pedro Moreno and Alejandro Chaban. Special participation takes Gaby Espino.

== Plot ==
Mariana Montiel is a young and beautiful executive at the head of ANGEL'S, the executive airline founded by her father. She has been skilled and very shrewd in business but in love she is completely different, since she failed to protect one thing that she loves most: her own marriage. Since she met and fell in love with the good-looking and brilliant architect Daniel Montiel with whom she had a passionate affair that resulted beautiful Adriana, a baby who was a reason of two of them getting married. Marriage in its first phase was happy, Mariana gave all trust to her husband, helping company growth, but Daniel took the rise of his career to continue his single life quoted. Sarah, Mariana's beautiful and sexy cousin, who was always jealous of living in Mariana's shadow, took advantage of Daniel's opportunity, becoming his mistress. Sarah's life goal would be taking Mariana's company position in Angel's. Behind her sophisticated appearance hides an unscrupulous woman, who just wants to get money and power, so she becomes entangled in the affairs of the drug mafia and Ricky Montana, who seeks to use the image of the Airline to launder money. As Sarah's ambition has no limits, she plans to kill her with help of her accomplice Ricky Montana. Montana, as a way to test the loyalty of his lover Analía, who is in fact an undercover agent, orders her to kill Mariana. Analía accepts, but she has no intention to really kill her. Her life goal is to trap Montana, and put him on the electric chair, so she could revenge him for murdering the love of her life. That day, Mariana discovers her husband's infidelity and in a fit of madness and pain, she leaves her anniversary party. Analía gets into her car with the gun to allegedly kill her, but Mariana's car, which was broken, rolls of a cliff. Dr. Armando Rivera and his assistant sees a woman with burned skin and they run to help her. Dr. Armando finds a picture of Analía and decides to rebuild her face, using an experimental procedure of cloning, not knowing that the girl is actually Mariana. Everyone believes that Mariana no longer exists, and her husband and family are destroyed by that fact. Montana trusts Analía again, but he is devastated by the fact that she is not appearing. Armando finds out that Analía was a drug trafficker, stripper and that she was accused for murder, not knowing that she was actually undercover agent, so he decides not to tell her his real identity, because he doesn't know that the girl is Mariana. He calls her Ana, and he doesn't allow her to leave the house. One day she escapes and saves drowning child on the beach confronting her daughter and husband again, but Mariana in the body of Analía doesn't remember them. They fall in love again. Mariana Montiel returns home as her own daughter's nanny, but the criminal history of the true "Analía" will not allow her to be happy. She must live carrying forth the life and crimes of the woman whose face she carries − The Face of Analía.

== Cast ==
Actor	Character	Description
Elizabeth Gutiérrez	Ana Rivera (Mariana Montiel) / Ana Lucía "Analía" Moncada / Analía's clone	Main Heroine. Daniel's wife, Adriana's mother; has an accident with Analía, is saved by Armando and is believed to be Analía, so Armando reconstructs her face after Analía's; Her memory is deleted and is forced to live behind the shadows of Analía's life; Secret agent of the Anti-Narcotic Agency; has an accident with Mariana, survives and is saved by Armando who will keep her and make experiments on her; she manages to escape and takes again the mission of capturing Montana; ends up with Mariana's original face; appears in the novela after 100 episodes (first seen in episode 1 and believed dead in the next episodes); complementary roles: Analía's clone used by Marlene to save Mariana; disintegrates
Martín Karpan	Daniel Montiel	Main Hero. Mariana's husband, Adriana's father, in love with Mariana and Analía, Sarah's ex-lover
Maritza Rodríguez	Sarah Andrade	Main Villain. Mariana's cousin, Ricky's accomplice, Daniel's ex-lover, hates Mariana and Analía; dies by falling of a cliff in a car
Gabriel Porras	Ricardo Rivera "Ricky Montana"	Main Villain. Drug trafficker, Armando's step-son, obsessed with Analía; ends in a jail paralyzed
Karla Monroig	Isabel Martínez	Mariana's best friend, lawyer of the Andrade family, Adriana's godmother, was in love with Daniel, in love with Mauricio.
Zully Montero	Carmen Rodríguez de Andrade "La Griega"	Main Villain. Criminal, serial killer, Ernesto's wife, Sarah's aunt; killed by some patients
Elluz Peraza	Olga Palacios	Miguel and Mariana's mother, was in love with Ernesto, in love with Nelson
Flavio Caballero	Capitan Nelson Lares	Detective, in love with Olga
Flor Núñez	Agustina Moncada	Analía and Camila's mother, Olga's friend
Daniel Lugo	Dr. Armando Rivera	Scientist who accidentally puts Analía's face on Mariana (saved both their lives two times), Ricky's step-father, was in love with Analía and Mariana
Manolo Coego	Celestino "El Gordo" Morales Camacho	Villain. Ricky's lawyer; ends in a jail
Germán Barrios	Ernesto Andrade	Mariana and Miguel's father, Sarah's uncle, Carmen's husband, in love with Olga
Jorge Consejo	Roberto Picano	Dr. Armando's assistant, in love with Chanicua
Andrés García Jr.	Padre Benito Santoya	Priest, his mother was killed by Carmen
José Guillermo Cortines	Mauricio Montiel	Daniel's brother, was in love with Mariana, then in love with Isabel
Pedro Moreno	Cristóbal Colon	Lieutenant who works with Analía, in love with Camila
Evelin Santos	Marlene	Lesbian, was in love with Camila
Chela Arias	Yoya	Adriana's nanny; killed by Carmen
Alvaro Ruiz	Nieves	Chauffeur of the Andrade family, Ernesto's close friend
Gustavo Franco	René Solaz	Villain. Sarah's assistant and uncle; ends in a jail
Víctor Corona	Alfonso Romero "Chino"	Lupe's husband, Ricky's most loyal friend and follower, betrayed him; ends in a jail
Ana Gabriela Barboza	Vicky	Sarah's secretary, Miguel's secretary and best friend, intelligent hacker, in love with Miguel
Alejandro Chabán	Miguel Palacios	Olga and Ernesto's son, Mariana's brother, in love with Camila, Chanicua, and Vicky
Ximena Duque	Camila Moncada	Augustina's daughter, Analía's sister, Miguel's ex-wife, in love with Cristóbal, Cristóbal's wife
Jacqueline Márquez	Chanicua Duarte	Gangster, Pamela's daughter, Analía's friend, was in love with Miguel, then in love with Roberto
Angie Russian	Jasmine	Camila's best friend, betrays her by making love with Cristóbal
Daniela Nieves	Adriana Montiel	Mariana and Daniel's daughter
Gaby Espino	Mariana Andrade de Montiel / Ana Lucía "Analía" Moncada	Special Participation; appears as Mariana with the original face in the first episode and as Analía with the final face in the last episode

== Controversy ==
LaTele Television, a Venezuelan TV network, sued Telemundo, asserting that El Rostro de Analía was stolen from LaTele's telenovela "Maria, Maria".
