= Daniel Lugo (actor) =

Puerto Rican actor (born 1945)

- Born: July 30, 1945 (age 81); Aguadilla, Puerto Rico
- Occupation: actor

Daniel Lugo (born July 30, 1945, in Aguadilla, Puerto Rico) is a Puerto Rican actor.

He has played several prominent parts in telenovelas such as Prisionera, La Hija del Mariachi, El Rostro de Analía, and most recently as Renato Conde in La Casa de al Lado.

== TV series ==
- 1987 - Miami Vice ....Father of Ernesto Lupe
- 1995 - Amores de fin de siglo ....Santiago
- 1996 - Quirpa de tres mujeres ....Juan Cristóbal Landaeta
- 1998 - Reina de corazones ....Ramiro Vega
- 2004 - Prisionera....Rodolfo Russián
- 2006 - La hija del mariachi ....Comandante Leonardo Salas
- 2007 - Pecados ajenos ....Marcelo Mercenario
- 2008 - El Rostro de Analía ....Dr. Armando Rivera
- 2009 - El Capo ....Pacifico Blanco
- 2010 - El clon ....Ali Rashid
- 2011 - La casa de al lado ....Renato Conde
- 2013 - Las Bandidas ....Olegario Montoya'
- 2014 - Nora ....Otoniel Lobo
- 2015 - Escándalos
- 2020 - 100 días para enamorarnos ....Judge Francisco Guzmán
- 2022 - 'Til Jail Do Us Part ....Priest

== Films ==
- 1978 - El enterrador de cuentos
- 1979 - Dios los cría ....Carlos
- 1991 - Andreína
- 1985 - La gran fiesta
- 1986 - Nicolás y los demás ....Paco
- 1994 - Linda Sara ....Gustavo
- 1995 - El final
- 1995 - Manhattan Merengue! ....Don Cosme
- 1997 - La Primera Vez ....Benedicto
- 1997 - Salserín
- 1998 - Amaneció de Golpe
- 1998 - 100 años de perdón ....Valmore
- 1999 - Undercurrent ....Detective Leone
- 2001 - Second Honeymoon .... Antonio
- 2003 - Dreaming of Julia ....Capt.Rosado
- 2004 - Envy ....Italian Minister
- 2005 - My Backyard Was a Mountain ....Gentleman
- 2006 - Meteoro ....Turco
- 2006 - Thieves and Liars ....Carmona
- 2008 - Deception ....Mr. Ruiz
- 2014 - Las vacas con gafas ....Marcelino Sariego
- 2017 - American Made ....Adolfo Calero

== Theater ==
- 2010 - Hairspray .... Wilbur Turnblad.
