= Josefina del Toro Fulladosa =

Puerto Rican librarian

- Born: May 23, 1901; San Juan, Puerto Rico, US
- Died: November 19, 1975 (aged 74)
- Education: Simmons College; Columbia University
- Occupation: Librarian

Josefina del Toro Fulladosa (May 23, 1901 – November 19, 1975) was the first woman to become a library school professor in Puerto Rico and the first woman to serve as director of the University of Puerto Rico library. She was instrumental in developing academic libraries in Puerto Rico and was a strong advocate for the academic status of librarians.

== Early life and education ==
Josefina del Toro Fulladosa was born in San Juan, Puerto Rico, the daughter of Emilio del Toro Cuebas (Chief Justice of the Supreme Court of Puerto Rico from 1909 to 1922) and Josefina Fulladosa. Her mother died when she was four years old; her father encouraged her to pursue her studies. She attended Simmons College in Boston, Massachusetts and received a Bachelor of Science and Librarianship in 1925, becoming the first Puerto Rican graduate. She earned a Master of Library Science from Columbia University in 1938, specializing in bibliography and reference.

== Career ==
Del Toro Fulladosa started working at the University of Puerto Rico, Río Piedras Campus library at the age of 24 as an assistant librarian. After receiving her master's degree in New York, she returned to the University of Puerto Rico. She helped draft a report requesting faculty status for UPR librarians, which was approved unanimously by the board of trustees. During her time at UPR she held a variety of positions, with responsibilities including organizing the reference collection and the Puerto Rico collection; she later become the head of the reference department. In 1964, she was appointed director of the general library, the first woman in that position at the university.

In 1968 del Toro Fulladosa was responsible for establishing the first library school in Puerto Rico, the Escuela Graduada de Bibliotecología. She taught a number of courses there, including reference and library administration.

Del Toro Fulladosa was a frequent speaker and advocate for libraries, touring eight European countries during a cultural trip and serving as a consultant for the American Library Association as well as for the Puerto Rico Department of Education. She was a founding member and the second president of the Sociedad de Bibliotecarios de Puerto Rico (the Society of Librarians of Puerto Rico).

During a sabbatical and her retirement, she edited and prepared two of her father's books for publication.

In 1975, she received the rank of professor emeritus, the first librarian at the University of Puerto Rico to receive the title.

== Legacy ==
The library at the University of Puerto Rico, Río Piedras Campus features the Josefina del Toro Fulladosa Collection of rare materials, including books, manuscripts, and maps in the humanities and social sciences. The collection was founded in 1985.

The Josefina del Toro Fulladosa Award for Research and Magistral Lessons is the highest distinction awarded by the Sociedad de Bibliotecarios de Puerto Rico.
