= Carlos del Toro Orihuela =

Cuban artist (born 1954)

Carlos del Toro Orihuela (born October 15, 1954) is a Cuban artist specializing in engraving, painting and drawing.

Since 1971 to 1975 he studied in the Escuela Nacional de Bellas Artes "San Alejandro", in Havana, Cuba. In 1984 he graduated in Engraving, in the Instituto Superior de Arte (ISA), in Havana, Cuba.

== Individual exhibitions ==
Among his personal exhibitions we can mention in 1979 Exposición Litografías de Carlos del Toro in the Museo Nacional de Bellas Artes, in Havana, Cuba. In 1990 he presented Temperas, in Víctor Manuel Gallery, in Havana, Cuba. In 1991 he also exhibited Graphic Art and Paintings, in Bologna, Italy. In 1994 he made Entresaurios II, in the La Acacia Gallery, in Havana, Cuba. And in 1996 he presented Pintura/Grabado. Carlos del Toro, in the Taller Experimental de Gráfica (TEG), in Havana.

== Collective exhibitions ==
He was part of many collective exhibitions, among them we can mention in 1979 the First Trienal of Engraving Víctor Manuel, in the Galería de La Habana, in Havana, Cuba. In 1983 he was also included in Cuban Painting, in the Japan International Artists Society (JIAS), Yamaguchi Museum/ Hakodate Municipal Hall, Hokkaido, Japan. In 1991 he participated in 18 Peintres de Cuba à Paris, at the Festival de L'Humanité, Paris, France. In 1993 he was one of the selected artist to Internationale Grafick Biennale. Maastricht Exhibition and Congress Center (MECC), Maastricht, Netherlands. He has also participated in numerous group exhibitions in the southeastern United States, including Try Me at The Bottleworks in Athens, Georgia in 2006, Punto de Embarque at Tina Newton Gallery in Birmingham in 2007, Antes Que Nada at the Alabama School of Fine Arts in 2008, and En Cada Barrio Revolución at Avondale Bricks Gallery, also in Birmingham, Alabama, in 2012, and the Ambassador's Residence Show in Atlanta, Georgia in 2013.

== Awards ==
His work as artist has been recognized with a lot of prizes among them can be quoted a Mention gained in the VIII National Young saloon, Museo Nacional de Bellas Artes, Havana, Cuba. In 1982 the second Prize. The literature in visual arts about the Guillen's poetry, Sala Rubén Martínez Villena, Galería UNEAC, Havana, Cuba. He also obtained in 1993 Prize Oswaldo Guayasamín Museum. Encuentro de Grabado'93, Centro Provincial de Artes Plásticas y Diseño, Havana.
