= Reina de corazones (Venezuelan TV series) =

- Genre: Telenovela; Romance; Drama
- Created by: Humberto 'Kiko' Olivieri
- Written by: Humberto "Kico" Olivieri; Marco Tulio Socorro
- Directed by: Tony Rodríguez; Nicolás Di Blasi
- Starring: Emma Rabbe; Roberto Mateos; Daniel Lugo
- Opening theme: "Vuelan" by Mulato
- Country of origin: Venezuela
- Original language: Spanish
- No. of episodes: 123

Production
- Executive producer: Jhony Pulido Mora
- Producer: Hernando Faria
- Production location: Caracas

Original release
- Network: RCTV
- Release: June 1, 1998 – January 30, 1999

Reina de corazones is a Venezuelan telenovela written by Humberto 'Kiko' Olivieri and produced by Radio Caracas Televisión in 1998. This telenovela lasted 123 episodes and was distributed internationally by RCTV International.

Emma Rabbe and Roberto Mateos starred as the main protagonists with Dad Dager, Roberto Moll, Daniel Lugo and Kiara as antagonists.

== Synopsis ==
Reina de Corazones is a love story marked by falsehood, rivalry and excessive ambition. Marlene Paez is a beautiful blond surrounded by a kindly aura paradoxical to her firm and determined character. She transcends many levels of pain and misery to reach international success as a model. But fame is not enough, and her empty heart is divided both by her love for Santiago Porras and her search for the truth about her past. Soon, events conspire to draw her back to Topochal, the town of her birth, at the height of her career.

Santiago Porras is a man of great ideals and passions, who, for the love of Marlene, decides to take the road to priesthood after finding out that his father "El Diablo" is the presumed murderer of her parents. Destiny reunites Marlene and Santiago at the funeral of Marlene's stepmother Dolores. As the beautiful Marlene sheds her first tear, the sky explodes with rain, ending a lengthy and severe drought. Sensing that a miracle has occurred, the amazed and beholden townspeople claim Marlene as queen of their hearts.

Time has changed nothing; the passions of these reunited lovers still smolder. But a strong rivalry between two factions in the town, created and led by Ramiro Vegas and Odilo Santos, begins to intrude on their love. And in their battle for power, the two leaders ignore another true love story, that which bonds their adolescent children Julieta and Federico. Once again, political passions and a darkened past between families threaten to obstruct the purity of love.

Though tortured by their past, Marlene and Santiago share a goal: to dissolve the factions and reunite their beloved Topochal. In his crusade for harmony, Santiago recovers property documents that have been lost and returns the land to the original owners. Righting this wrong enables him to shed the cassock's enormous weight. Now a layman, Santiago goes to Marlene with an open heart, but she rejects him because of his earlier abandonment and with holding of the truth about his past.

To prevent a similar incident from happening again, Marlene and Santiago need to succeed in their quest to uncover truths and reconcile. They need to overcome their personal objective and aim for unity for themselves and their town.

== Cast ==
- Emma Rabbe as Marlene Paez/Sara
- Roberto Mateos as Santiago Porras
- Ricardo Álamo as Jean Paul
- Alberto Alifa as Father Barrientos
- César Bencid as Berensejo
- Marcos Campos as Matute
- Dad Dager as Catalina Monsalve
- Dessideria D'Caro as Maria Gracia
- Albi De Abreu as Federico
- Paola Eagles as Dulce
- Freddy Galavis as Juvenal
- Javier Gomez as Germán Andueza
- Luke Grande as Bartolo
- Francisco Guinot as Padre Servillo
- Carlos Guillermo Haydon as Adriano Vicentelli
- Tomas Henriquez as Fulgencio Cruz
- Kiara as Luisa Elena
- Maria Luisa Lamata as Socorro
- Jeannette Lehr as Elsa
- Daniel Lugo as Ramiro Vega
- Prakriti Maduro as Dayana
- Roberto Moll as Odilo Santos
- Denise Novell as Isabela Cotala
- Amalia Perez Diaz as Solvencia
- Jennifer Rodriguez as Julieta Carolina
- Jose Romero as Gandica
- Tania Sarabia as Zoila Guerra
- Carolina Tejera as Mesalina
- Beatriz Valdes as Salomé de Santos
