= Roberto Mateos =

Mexican telenovela actor

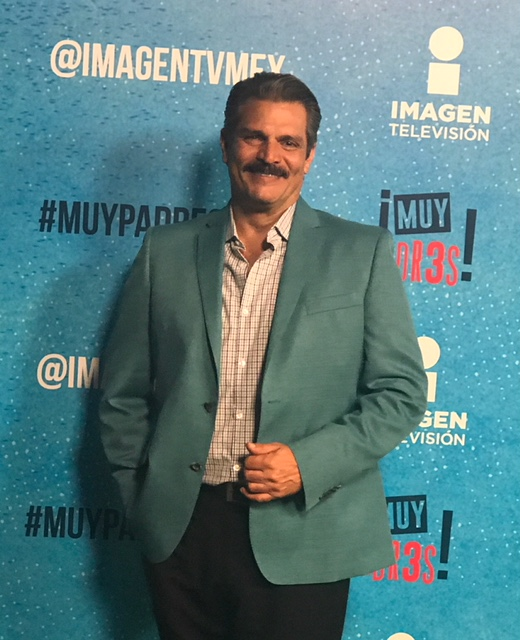
- Mateos at the Premier of Muy Padres, 2017
- Born: April 28, 1963 (age 62); Mexico City, Distrito Federal, Mexico
- Occupation: Actor
- Years active: 1989-present
- Spouse: Arancha Solis
- Children: Mirek Smeke (b. 1996)

Roberto Mateos (born April 28, 1963, in Mexico City, Distrito Federal, Mexico), is a Mexican actor of telenovelas. He is best known for his performance in most successful telenovelas productions such as Televisa, Venevision and Telemundo. He lives in Mexico City and Miami with wife and son.

== Filmography ==
=== Films ===
Year	Title	Role	Notes
1989	Un corazón para dos		Tabasco Films
1992	El beso final		Churubusco, Azteca e Imcine.
1995	Impulsos Asesinos		Producine de México.
1999	Todo contigo	Federico	Univisión Network.
2004	Historias y testigos: ¡Ni una muerta más!	Ernesto Del Valle	Television film
2004	Historias y testigos: Asesino de la galería	Ernesto Del Valle	Television film
2004	Historias y testigos: Propriedad privada	Ernesto Del Valle	Television film
2008	De rodillas	Armando	Cine Mexicano.
2010	Más sabe el diablo: El primer golpe	León Beltrán	Sequel to the telenovela
2013	Contraste	Don Ricardo	Clack Films.
2014	Game by game	Senador Olivares	Briones Brothers Productions.
2015	El Justiciero 3	Marcos	Cine Latino.
2024	Zeta	Esteban	Prime Video España.

=== Television ===
Year	Title	Role	Notes
1993	El peñón del amaranto	Diego	Supporting role
1997	Escándalo	Alfonso de la Rocha	Supporting role
1997	Al norte del corazón	Joel	Supporting role
1998	Reina de corazones	Santiago Porras	Lead role
1999	Carita Pintada	Abdul Abdulah	Supporting role
1999	Marea brava	Marcelo	Supporting role
2000	Hay amores que matan		Supporting role
2000	Milagros	José Antonio Wilson Gómez / José Antonio Echevarría	Lead role
2001	Amantes del desierto	Alejandro García	Supporting role
2002	Vale todo	Rubén	Supporting role
2002	Todo contigo	Federico	TV movie
2003	Ladrón de corazones	Esteban de Llaca	Supporting role
2005	Amarte así, Frijolito	Francisco Reyes	Supporting role
2006	Ni una vez más	Diego	Supporting role
2006	Decisiones	Arístides Giraldo	Episode: "Todos quieren a Niurka"
2007	Acorralada	Francisco "Paco" Vásquez	Supporting role
2008	Amor Comprado	Arturo Garibay	Supporting role
2008-09	Sin senos no hay paraíso	José Miguel Cárdenas	Supporting role
2008	Doña Bárbara	Lorenzo Barquero	Special guest
2009	Más sabe el diablo	León Beltrán	
2010	¿Dónde está Elisa?	Bruno Cáceres	
2011	Los herederos del Monte	Modesto Mardones	Supporting role
2011	Mi corazón insiste en Lola Volcán	Tiberio Guzmán	
2012	El rostro de la venganza	Federico Samaniego	Supporting role
2013	La Madame	Alejandro Puerta	Supporting role
2013-14	Santa Diabla	Patricio Vidal	
2016	Eva la Trailera	Pancho Mogollón	Supporting role
2016	Perseguidos	Hernán Molina	Supporting role
2017	Surviving Escobar	Dixon	Supporting role
2017	Muy padres	Rodolfo Villagrana Robles	Supporting role
2018	Las Buchonas	Vicente Cervantes	
2019	El Dragón: Return of a Warrior	Epigmenio Moncada	
2020	Deudas	Carlos Alberto	Supporting role
2021	Si nos dejan	Facundo Guerra	Supporting role
2022	Implacables: México	Genaro Vidal	Supporting role
2023	De brutas, nada	Manuel	Supporting role
2023	Mrs. Davis	The Pope	Supporting role
2023	Los artistas: primeros trazos	Tito Villar	Supporting role
2024	Mano de hierro	Rafael Ramirez Pereira	Supporting role
2024	Tu vida es mi vida	Alex Castillo	Supporting role
2024	Mi amor sin tiempo	José	Supporting role
2024	Ligeramente diva	Saúl	Supporting role
2025	Juegos de amor y poder		Supporting role
2025	Zeta	Esteban Furiase	Supporting role
