= Del Toro River =

Coordinates: 29°56′32″S 70°4′13″W

Location
- Country: Chile

The Del Toro River is a river of Chile.

== See also ==
- List of rivers of Chile
