= Uriel del Toro =

Mexican actor and model (born 1978)

- Born: August 10, 1978 (age 46); Mexico City, Mexico
- Occupations: Actor; model
- Years active: 2005–present

Uriel del Toro (born August 10, 1978) is a Mexican actor and model. He has carried out exclusive advertising campaigns in Barcelona, Madrid, Hamburg and Milan for brands such as Diesel, Armani and Levi's. He has also worked for Aghata Ruiz de la Prada, Prototype, Nike, Adidas, Calvin Klein and Pepe Jeans among others. During the Fashion Week Mexico 2008 has been awarded the prize for "Best Male Model". On television he has been known for his characters in telenovelas as La que no podía amar, La Impostora, Mariposa de Barrio, and Al otro lado del muro.

== Filmography ==
Film roles
Year	Title	Roles	Notes
2006	Con lujo de detalle	Gabriel	Short film
2008	Casi divas	Conductor	
2012	El arribo de Conrado Sierra	Nazareno del Real	
2016	Amo	Male character	Video short
2017	How to Break Up with Your Douchebag	Novio yogurt 3	
2024	El roomie	Milton	

Television roles
Year	Title	Roles	Notes
2005	Top Models	Paco	
2009	New Generation	Himself	Television host
2009	Adictos	Unknown role	Episode: "Robar"
2010	Niña de mi corazón	Bruno	
2011–2012	La que no podía amar	Hugo	Recurring role; 114 episodes
2013	Mentir para vivir	Pedro	Recurring role; 6 episodes
2014	La Impostora	Rafael Moreno	Recurring role; 116 episodes
2016	Yago	Unknown role	Episode: "Episode 36"
2017	Las 13 esposas de Wilson Fernández	Alejandro Rodriguez	Episode: "Emilia"
2017	Mariposa de Barrio	Juan Rivera 21–34 Years Old	Recurring role; 54 episodes
2018	Al otro lado del muro	Andrés Suárez	Recurring role; 69 episodes
2018–2019	Falsa identidad	José Hernández "Joselito"	Recurring role (season 1); 72 episodes
2021	Malverde: El Santo Patrón	Rodolfo Fierro	5 episodes
2024	El Conde: Amor y honor	Antonio Rodríguez	
2024	La isla: desafío extremo	Himself	
2025	La Jefa	El Cuervo	Guest role
