= Tomás del Toro del Villar =

Mexican politician

- Born: 15 February 1959 (age 67); Guerrero, Mexico
- Occupation: Politician
- Political party: PAN

Tomás del Toro del Villar (born 15 February 1959) is a Mexican politician from the National Action Party. From 2006 to 2009 he served as Deputy of the LX Legislature of the Mexican Congress representing the State of Mexico.
