= La isla: desafío extremo =

- Genre: Reality competition
- Based on: Desafío
- Presented by: Javier Poza; Héctor Suárez Gomís
- Country of origin: United States
- Original language: Spanish
- No. of seasons: 2
- No. of episodes: 112

Production
- Executive producer: Francisco Suárez
- Camera setup: Multi-camera
- Production company: Acun Medya

Original release
- Network: Telemundo
- Release: July 30, 2024 – present

La isla: desafío extremo, or simply La isla, is an American reality competition television series based on the Colombian television series Desafío. The series is hosted by Javier Poza. It premiered on Telemundo on July 30, 2024.

In May 2025, the series was renewed for a second season that premiered on October 7, 2025.

== Format ==
The series places a group of celebrities and civilians in a remote isolated location, where they are divided into three teams: the Eagles, the Sharks, and the Panthers. Each week, teams compete for the condition they will live that week, either High Beach with all amenities, Medium Beach with some amenities or Low Beach with no amenities at all. In addition, they will compete for leadership, immunity and rewards. The contestants are progressively eliminated from the game as they are voted out by their fellow contestants. The last contestant standing wins the grand prize of $200,000.

=== Challenges ===
- Mission Challenge: The teams compete to win the emblem, a symbolic relic of each of Turkey's cities. The two teams with the most emblems before the switch retain their color, name and legacy.
- Territorial Challenge: The teams compete for the best living conditions, with the winners receiving the keys to High Beach, a luxury beach house with air conditioning, pool, hot water and furnished with beds. The meals of their choice are prepared by a chef. The second place team goes to Medium Beach, which provides them with basic necessities for survival, a roof, a small refrigerator, beds and a bathroom, but have a minimum ration of food and water. The third place team receives the keys to Low Beach, which has the worst living conditions, members have to live outdoors or build their own shelter, and have poor food ration and are not provided with water.
- Captains' Battle: Each week a team captain is appointed by vote. The captains face each other in a challenge, and the winner gets an advantage for their team in a challenge of their choice.
- Punishment Challenge: The teams compete to avoid a punishment. The second place team must choose one member of their team to serve the punishment, while the team who comes in last must choose two members to serve the punishment.
- Adventure Challenge: The teams compete to win the opportunity to live a traditional experience of the region where they are located.
- Immunity Challenge: The teams compete for immunity from elimination. After the absorption of a team, there is two Immunity Challenges and the teams nominate one member at the Trial for each Immunity Challenge lost.
- Honor Challenge: The losing teams of the Immunity Challenge compete to determine the number of members each team will nominate in the trial. The winning team will nominate one member, while the losing team will nominate two members. This challenge is discontinued after the absorption of a team.
- Money Challenge: The teams compete to win extra money, separate from the $200,000 grand prize, and can keep it even if they are eliminated from the competition.
- Territory Revenge Challenge: The teams compete once again for the best living conditions. The team living on High Beach must defend their territory against other teams. If they fail to do so, they are expelled and must move to one of the other beaches.
- Power Challenge: The contestants compete individually to win the Power Bracelet and thus save one of the nominees. In the first round, contestants from the same team compete against each other. The two winners from each team advance to the final round. If a nominee wins, they cannot save themselves and must use it on another nominee.
- Reward Challenge: The teams compite for luxuries, food, or trips to local sites.
- Total Immunity Challenge: After a team is dissolved, the remaining teams no longer vote to select their captains. Contestants from the same team compete against each other to win captaincy and total immunity for the week.
- Sentencing Challenge: Teams compete to send a contestant from the opposing team directly to the Elimination Challenge. The contestant chosen is not eligible to be saved with the Power Bracelet.

== Series overview ==
Season	Episodes	Originally released		Location	Contestants	Teams	Winner	Runner–up
Season	Episodes	First released	Last released	Location	Contestants	Teams	Winner	Runner–up
1	66	July 30, 2024	October 14, 2024	Turkey	27	3	Adrián Di Monte	Hubert Riascos
2	46	October 7, 2025	December 1, 2025	Dominican Republic	18	3	Gary Centeno	Martín Salvador

== Production ==
On May 9, 2024, La isla: desafío extremo was announced as part of Telemundo's programming lineup for the 2024–25 television season. That same day, Javier Poza was announced as host of the series. The series premiered on July 30, 2024.

On May 8, 2025, Telemundo renewed the series por a second season. On August 28, 2025, it was announced that Héctor Suárez Gomís would replace Javier Poza as host of the series. The second season premiered on October 7, 2025.

== Reception ==
=== Ratings ===
Viewership and ratings per season of La isla: desafío extremo
Season	Timeslot (ET)	Episodes	First aired		Last aired		Avg. viewers (millions)
Season	Timeslot (ET)	Episodes	Date	Viewers (millions)	Date	Viewers (millions)	Avg. viewers (millions)
1	Sun–Fri 7:00 p.m.	66	July 30, 2024	1.03	October 14, 2024	1.30	0.96
2	Sun–Fri 7:00 p.m.	46	October 7, 2025	1.14	December 1, 2025	TBD	TBD

=== Awards and nominations ===
Year	Award	Category	Nominated	Result	Ref
2025	Produ Awards	Best Adapted Talent and Skill Reality Series	La isla: desafío extremo	Nominated	
