= Yamile =

Yamile or Yamilé is a feminine given name. Notable people with the name include:

== Given name ==
- Yamilé Aldama (born 1972), Cuban triple jumper
- Yamilé Bahamonde (born 1987), Ecuadorian swimmer
- Yamilé Córdova (born 1972), Cuban tennis player
- Yamile Dajud, Argentine-Colombian beauty pageant titleholder
- Yamile Franco (born 1992), Mexican football midfielder
- Yamile Haraoui Ghebalou, Algerian academic
- Yamile Fors Guerra (born 1977), Cuban tennis player
- Yamilé Martínez (born 1970), Cuban basketball player
- Yamile Saied Méndez, Argentine-American author

== Middle name ==
- Brenda Yamilé Jiménez Loya, Mexican actress and model
