= Roberto Levermann =

Mexican actor and writer

Roberto Levermann is a Mexican actor and writer. Born in Mexico City, Mexico, he began his acting career in 1993 on Mexico City's theatrical stages, from that year to 2000 he performed in over 15 plays, some of which were written by himself.

In 2000 he moved to Miami, Florida, where he stayed and made a solid career in the Hispanic TV on the two top Hispanic networks: Telemundo and Univision.

As a writer he has been appointed to be one of the writers for Seguro y Urgente and the head writer for Corriendo y Grabando.

== Telenovelas ==
- Alma Indomable (2009) as Theofilo "Theo"
- Perro Amor (2009) as Usnavy Murillo
- Olvidarte Jamas (2006) as Edelmiro Correa
- Prisionera (2004) as Maximo Gallardo
- ¡Anita, no te rajes! (2005) as Venustiano Gonzalez
- Amor Descarado (2003) as Homero Silva

== Other TV shows ==
- ATM (2005) as Clodomiro de la Garza
- Decisiones (2005) as Lalo
- Loteria (2006) as Isaias London
- Tomalo Suave (2007) as Romulo
- Seguro y Urgente (2007) as Joselo Sanchez
