= Si nos dejan =

Mexican telenovela

- Genre: Telenovela
- Based on: Señora Isabel by Bernardo Romero Pereiro and Mónica Agudelo
- Developed by: Leonardo Padrón
- Written by: Vicente Albarracín; Carlos Eloy Castro; Valentina Sequera; Karla Sainz de la Peña Alcocer
- Directed by: Luis Manzo; Carlos Cock Marín; Pável Vázquez
- Starring: Mayrín Villanueva; Marcus Ornellas; Alexis Ayala; Scarlet Gruber; Isabel Burr; Álex Perea
- Theme music composer: Jose Alfredo Jimenez
- Opening theme: "Si nos dejan" by Belinda & Christian Nodal
- Composers: Jaime Vargas Fabila; Roberto Sánchez Bustos; Álvaro Trespalacios
- Country of origin: Mexico
- Original language: Spanish
- No. of seasons: 1
- No. of episodes: 83

Production
- Executive producer: Carlos Bardasano
- Producer: María Eugenia Fernández
- Editor: Alba Merchán Hamann
- Production companies: W Studios; Televisa

Original release
- Network: Univision; Las Estrellas
- Release: 1 June – 11 October 2021

Related
- Mirada de mujer; Victoria; Ana de nadie

Si nos dejan (English: If They Let Us) is a Mexican telenovela produced by W Studios for Televisa. The series is an adaptation of the 1993 Colombian telenovela Señora Isabel, which most recent popular version was Victoria. The series first aired in the United States on Univision from 1 June 2021 to 11 October 2021. In Mexico, the series aired on Las Estrellas from 1 November 2021 to 20 February 2022.

The series stars Mayrín Villanueva, Alexis Ayala, and Marcus Ornellas.

== Plot ==
Alicia Montiel (Mayrín Villanueva) is married to Sergio Carranza (Alexis Ayala), a prominent journalist in Mexico. They have three children and are perceived as an ideal family in their social circle. Alicia's marriage deteriorates when she discovers that Sergio has been having an affair for three years with Julieta Lugo, his co-host. Alicia pursues a divorce and begins a relationship with Martín Guerra (Marcus Ornellas), a younger journalist who is Sergio's professional rival.

== Cast ==
=== Main ===
- Mayrín Villanueva as Alicia Montiel de Carranza
- Marcus Ornellas as Martín Guerra
- Alexis Ayala as Sergio Carranza
- Scarlet Gruber as Julieta Lugo
- Isabel Burr as Yuridia "Yuri" Carranza
- Álex Perea as José Rafael Fuente "Cholo"
- Lorena Graniewicz as Karina Gómez
- Carlos Said as Gonzalo Carranza
- Isidora Vives as Miranda Carranza
- Mónica Sánchez Navarro as Yaya
- Víctor Civeira as Ángel “Diablo” Rentería
- Jorge Gallegos as Moisés Zapata
- Henry Zakka as Fabián
- Gabriela Carrillo as Carlota Vegas
- Ara Saldívar as Celia "Chela" Ortega
- Solkin Ruz as Lucas Bejarano
- Amairani as Maruja
- Paco Luna as Diego “Culebra”
- Ramiro Tomasini as Gutiérrez
- Natassia Villasana as Marcela Cruz
- Sofia Rivera Torres as Mabel Rangel
- Elissa Marie Soto Bazán as Sofía Guerra
- Roberto Mateos as Facundo Guerra
- Mónica Dionne as Rebecca
- Mauricio Pimentel as Alberto Mujica
- Gabriela Spanic as Fedora Montelongo
- Susana Dosamantes as Eva de Montiel

=== Recurring and guest stars ===
- José María Galeano as Samuel
- Pakey Vázquez as El Toro
- Gerardo Murguía as Julio Tamayo
- Paola Toyos as Prudencia
- Juan Pablo Gil as Francisco
- Karla Gaytán as Luna Cruz
- Claudia Zepeda as Lorena
- Nicole Curiel as Nicole
- Ana Celeste Montalvo as Ariana Mijares
- Marcelo Buquet as Quijada
- Ignacio Ortiz Jr. as Suso
- Arancha del Toro as Ladire
- Manuel Riguezza as Simón Guerra Vegas
- Manuel Castillo as Quique Cruz
- Sonya Smith

== Production ==
The telenovela was presented during the Univision upfront for the 2020–2021 television season. Mayrín Villanueva, Marcus Ornellas, and Eduardo Yañez were announced in the main roles on 2 February 2021. However, on 12 February 2021, it was announced that due to health issues Eduardo Yañez would no longer star in the series and that Alexis Ayala would be his replacement. Filming of the series began on 16 February 2021, with the rest of the cast being announced.

The series was adapted by Venezuelan writer Leonardo Padrón. Principal photography took place at Televisa's San Ángel forums and on location in Mexico City.

== Episodes ==
No.	Title	Original release date	U.S. viewers (millions)
1	"Una vida que cambia"	1 June 2021	1.62
Alícia lives in what seems like a perfect family, her husband, Sergio, is a renowned journalist. A sporadic encounter with Martín will be the beginning of the change, as her life will be about to be destroyed when she discovers Sergio's secret.
2	"Matrimonio destruido"	2 June 2021	1.69
Alicia discovers that Julieta is Sergio's lover. Gonzalo confesses to Yuridia that he has no interest in his medical career. Moisés suspects that Yuridia does not want to marry him. Julieta carries out her plans to get rid of Alicia.
3	"El mejor periodista"	4 June 2021	1.42
Alicia suffers knowing that Sergio was unfaithful to her. Fedora advises Alicia to divorce Sergio in order to have a new life. El Cholo begins to feel a great attraction for Yuridia. Sergio wins the award for the best journalist in Mexico.
4	"Amor ficticio"	7 June 2021	1.48
Sergio is afraid that Julieta will tell the press about their relationship. Martín begins to feel a great attraction for Alicia. Alicia devises a plan to show that Sergio is not the good man he claims to be. Gonzalo decides to start studying to be a chef.
5	"Desesperación"	8 June 2021	1.51
Julieta suffers knowing that Sergio does not plan to divorce Alicia. Alicia seeks psychological help in order to overcome Sergio's betrayals. Sergio devises a plan to avoid losing his family. Alicia plans to tell the press about Sergio’s romance.
6	"Amor a distancia"	9 June 2021	1.46
Martín fears that because of Yuri, Cholo will get out of jail. Gonzalo suspects that Sergio is being unfaithful to Alicia. Gonzalo begins to study gastronomy. Alicia discovers that Martín is interested in her.
7	"Sueños rotos"	10 June 2021	1.47
Fabián asks Julieta to avoid telling the press about her romance with Sergio. Yuri is upset to learn that Moisés is not interested in their relationship. Alicia tells Martín about her dream of being a great theater writer. Martín discovers Sergio and Julieta kissing. Sergio tries to win back his wife with a serenade.
8	"Un regalo muy especial"	11 June 2021	1.32
Sergio asks Alicia to remarry him. Sergio manages to make his children believe that he is a good husband. Fabián assures Sergio that Alicia will not renew her wedding vows. Sofía suspects that Martín is interested in Karina.
9	"Del trabajo a la cama"	14 June 2021	1.70
Julieta is happy to learn that her relationship with Sergio has been exposed. Eva assures Alicia that Julieta is responsible for having told everyone about her relationship with Sergio.
10	"Falso arrepentimiento"	15 June 2021	1.54
Alicia kicks Sergio out of the house, and the family falls apart due to Sergio's infidelity. On the other hand, Tamayo, the president of the channel, orders Sergio and Julieta to face the truth in front of the cameras.
11	"Importante comunicado"	16 June 2021	1.56
Sergio assures viewers that his relationship with Julieta is false. Martín fears that El Cholo will get out of jail. Rebeca assures Fabián that Sergio is not the good man he claims to be.
12	"Enfrentamientos"	17 June 2021	1.67
Eva confronts Julieta to ask her to get away from Sergio. Eva assures Julieta that Sergio is only playing with her feelings. Martín confesses to Montiel the great love he feels for Alicia.
13	"Fuertes decisiones"	21 June 2021	1.70
Lucas asks Sergio to help him get Alicia away from the foundation. Sergio is afraid that Alicia will know that Lucas is his son. Fedora begins to feel a great attraction for Gonzalo. Martín suspects that Sergio wants to get rid of him.
14	"Deshonra"	22 June 2021	1.56
Lucas is upset to learn that Alicia wants to take over the foundation. Sergio discovers that Gonzalo has been expelled from the university. Lucas demands that Sergio fire Alicia from the foundation.
15	"Falso amor"	23 June 2021	1.50
Sergio hits Gonzalo upon hearing him say that he is a bad father. Julieta prepares a plan to make Sergio believe that Martín is responsible for having told everyone about their relationship.
16	"Descuidos"	25 June 2021	1.26
Martín suspects that Alicia is interested in him. Julieta carries out her plans to get rid of Martín. Sergio is upset to learn that Miranda is ill because of Alicia's poor care.
17	"Nuevos problemas"	28 June 2021	1.61
El Cholo asks Zote to help him find out about Yuri's whereabouts. Martín discovers that someone is accusing him of having published the romance between Julieta and Sergio. Sofía suspects that her mother is still in love with Martín.
18	"Mentiras piadosas"	29 June 2021	1.52
Sergio suspects that Martín is interested in Alicia. Fedora asks Gonzalo not to tell anyone that they spent the night together. Julieta assures Gloria that Sergio will divorce Alicia.
19	"Despido injustificado"	30 June 2021	1.48
El Cholo assures Yuri that he is a murderer. Martín makes it clear to Sofía that his relationship with Carlota will never be the same again. Quique enters Carlota's house to steal her belongings. Gonzalo is upset.
20	"Malas decisiones"	1 July 2021	1.51
Julieta assures Sergio that Martín is a bad journalist. Sergio demands that Martín stay away from Alicia. El Diablo decides to quit his job when he learns that Sergio unjustifiably fired Martín.
21	"Amor no correspondido"	2 July 2021	1.43
Sergio tells Alicia that he has a proposal for her to believe in him again, regain her trust and obtain her forgiveness. So that Sergio does not spend his birthday alone, his daughters throw him a surprise party.
22	"Plan de venganza"	5 July 2021	1.33
Julieta carries out her plans to ruin Sergio's birthday party. Fedora is enraged to learn that Gonzalo is dating Lorena. Sergio makes Alicia believe that he has moved away from Julieta. Martín is saddened.
23	"Fuertes traiciones"	7 July 2021	1.67
Facundo confronts El Cholo to discover the whereabouts of his son. Sergio fears that Alicia will discover that he continues to see Julieta. Julieta assures Alicia that Sergio continues to fall in love with her.
24	"Fuertes amenazas"	8 July 2021	1.61
Alicia discovers that Sergio continues to cheat on her. Lucas threatens Sergio with confessing to Alicia the truth about his origin if he does not give him the absolute power of the foundation.
25	"Nuevas oportunidades"	9 July 2021	1.45
Sergio is upset to learn that Alicia wants a divorce. Alicia assures her children that Sergio continues to be in love with Julieta. Carlota convinces Fedora to report Samuel. Eva asks Alicia to try to rebuild her life with Sergio.
26	"Un nuevo romance"	12 July 2021	1.56
El Cholo kisses Yuri to show her the immense love he feels for her. Julieta is upset to learn that Sergio was fired from the channel. Lucas fears that Alicia will discover the bad deals he had for years with the foundation.
27	"Fuera de casa"	13 July 2021	1.61
Alicia asks Segio for a divorce. Gonzalo fights with Samuel after finding out that he abuses Fedora. Alicia tells her children that Sergio kicked her out the house.
28	"Compromisos"	15 July 2021	1.54
Moisés is upset that Yuri canceled the wedding. El Cholo asks his lawyer to help him show that he is not an assassin. Alicia begins to feel a great attraction for Martín.
29	"Formas de amar"	16 July 2021	1.33
After finding out that El Cholo is in love with Yuri, Moisés decides to be Cholo’s new lawyer and that way avoid that he gets out prison. Sergio assures Julieta that he will soon divorce Alicia. Karina gets jealous after knowing that Martín is going out with Alicia.
30	"Sospechas de amor"	19 July 2021	1.76
Sergio is upset to learn that Alicia is dating another man. Miranda begins to feel attracted to El Culebra. Alicia discovers the place where Miranda was hidden. Due to a storm, Alicia and Martín spend the night together.
31	"Exigencias"	20 July 2021	1.70
Samuel hits Fedora upon seeing her arrive home. Sergio asks Alicia to explain why she has a friendship with Martín. Quique's mother suspects that her son is a criminal. Karina assures Carlota that Martín thinks of another woman.
32	"Enfrentamientos"	21 July 2021	1.43
Lucas fires Alicia from the foundation on Sergio's orders. Alicia threatens Lucas with telling Sergio that he is a scammer if he continues to attack her. Diablo assures Martín that Sergio could kill him if he knew that he was in love with Alicia.
33	"Sospechas de amor"	23 July 2021	1.37
Martín asks Alicia to acknowledge her love for him. Yuri is upset to learn that Moisés is El Cholo's new lawyer. Carlota discovers that Martín is in love with Alicia.
34	"Amenazas"	26 July 2021	1.62
Fedora makes Samuel believe that Gonzalo is not her lover to prevent him from killing him. Julieta makes up the news that Sergio has divorced Alicia. Eva asks Sergio to find out if Alicia is dating another man.
35	"Plan de escape"	27 July 2021	1.53
Zote helps El Cholo escape from jail. Fedora fears that Alicia will find out that Gonzalo is her lover. Sergio suspects that Julieta is responsible for breaking the news about his divorce.
36	"Fugitivo"	28 July 2021	1.60
Yuri assures Chela that El Cholo is a good man. Lorena discovers that Fedora is Gonzalo's lover. Nicole assures El Culebra that Miranda is a drug addict.
37	"Humillaciones"	30 July 2021	1.50
Sergio threatens Alicia with taking her children from her if she continues to see Martín. Facundo demands that Mujica imprison El Cholo. Eva humiliates Alicia when she finds out that Martín is her lover.
38	"Decepciones"	2 August 2021	1.60
Sergio threatens the school principal with destroying her reputation if she continues to accuse Miranda of being a drug addict. Rebeca discovers that she suffers from Alzheimer's. Sofía suffers when she sees Martín kissing Alicia.
39	"Amor prohibido"	3 August 2021	1.60
Sofía is upset to learn that Martín is in love with Alicia. Alicia decides to end her relationship with Martín to avoid having more problems with Sergio and her family. Fabián suffers knowing that Rebeca suffers from Alzheimer's.
40	"Mala presentación"	4 August 2021	1.52
Alicia introduces Martín as her boyfriend in front of her family. Sergio is upset to learn that Alicia has divorced him. Alicia confesses to Carlota the love she feels for Martín.
41	"Amor conflictivo"	5 August 2021	1.52
Martín discovers that Sergio is investigating him. Gómez and Fuentes carry out an operation to capture El Cholo. Sofía decides to get away from Martín when she learns that he is rebuilding his life with another woman.
42	"Injusticias"	6 August 2021	1.47
Alicia suffers to learn that Yuri was imprisoned. Moisés asks Mujica to free Yuri. Mujica makes Moisés believe that Yuri is interested in another man. Samuel suspects that Fedora continues to be unfaithful to him.
43	"Ayuda necesaria"	9 August 2021	1.68
Eva is furious when she learns that Alicia's relationship with Martín has been published in the newspaper. Carlota suffers when she sees a photo of Martín kissing Alicia. Julieta asks Sergio to give her the opportunity to live with his children.
44	"Falsos amores"	10 August 2021	1.42
Julieta wants to do a report on Facundo Guerra to improve her career as a journalist. Meanwhile, Alicia goes to therapy with Carlota, who manipulates her into ending her relationship with Martín.
45	"Relación terminada"	11 August 2021	1.50
Alicia decides to end her relationship with Martín. Also, Sergio learns that Julieta will have her own show.
46	"Un nuevo show"	12 August 2021	1.45
El Cholo manages to reconnect with Yuri. During an interview, Facundo assures Julieta that El Cholo is not involved in the murder of his son. Sergio asks El Diablo to investigate Julieta's new show.
47	"Falsas acusaciones"	13 August 2021	1.31
Alicia is surprised to see that Sergio wants to kick her out of her house. Lucas decides to take a DNA test to prove that he is Sergio's son. Sergio asks Quijada for help to ruin Alicia.
48	"Lucha de amor"	16 August 2021	1.64
Alicia tells Marcela how her family gave her a hard time just because she fell in love with Martín. Julieta hires one of the best chefs in Mexico to prepare a very special dinner for Sergio's children.
49	"Nuevos caminos"	17 August 2021	1.64
El Cholo fears that Alicia will discover that he is hiding in his house. Gonzalo denies having a friendship with Laureano and Natalia to prevent Sergio from knowing that he is not studying medicine.
50	"Sospechas de amor"	19 August 2021	1.73
Alicia fears that Martín no longer loves her when she sees him go out with Mabe. The inspector visits Yuri's house to find out if she continues to be an accomplice of El Cholo. Samuel threatens Fedora with killing her if she continues dating Gonzalo.
51	"Disparo accidental"	20 August 2021	1.29
Gonzalo defends Fedora from Samuel's attacks. Gonzalo accidentally shoots Samuel leaving him seriously injured. Julieta continues with the investigation into the murder of Simón.
52	"Reencuentro de amor"	23 August 2021	1.73
Alicia is reunited with Martín. Mujica interrogates Gonzalo to find out if he is responsible for the attempt on Samuel's life. Eva loses a large amount of money at the casino.
53	"Noticia no autorizada"	24 August 2021	1.61
Martín discovers that Facundo signed an authorization to make the interview public. Meanwhile, Alicia goes to Carlota, but Sofía forgets a notebook and Martín returns for it.
54	"Fuerte traición"	26 August 2021	1.65
Alicia is upset to learn that because of Carlota, her relationship with Martín is over. Carlota tells Martín that she still loves him. Fedora takes advantage of Samuel's poor health to kill him.
55	"Amor desenfrenado"	27 August 2021	1.44
Martín spends the night with Alicia. Sergio discovers that Gonzalo left his medical major to become a baker. El Culebra confesses his love for Miranda on his social networks.
56	"Problemas interminables"	30 August 2021	1.70
Yaya finds Miranda passed out in her room. Mabel congratulates Martín for the good work he has done at the TV station. Sergio accuses Alicia of being responsible for Miranda's suicide attempt.
57	"Venganza"	31 August 2021	1.86
Sergio finds Alicia making out with Martín and threatens to take her children away from her. Meanwhile, Samuel has escaped from the hospital and Fedora fears for her life.
58	"Cinismo"	1 September 2021	1.75
Sergio takes Miranda's custody away from Alicia. Sergio kicks Alicia out of his house and assures his children that Alicia is a bad mother. Carlota talks to El Diablo to find out if everything Alicia told her about Sergio is real.
59	"Suplicas"	3 September 2021	1.61
Eva asks Martín to stay away from Alicia to prevent her from losing the luxurious life she has with Sergio. Due to her drunkenness, Carlota and Diablo spend the night together.
60	"Amor imposible"	6 September 2021	1.63
Martín decides to end his relationship with Alicia to prevent her from losing her family. Karina interrogates Quique to find out if he killed Simón. Julieta organizes a party to celebrate that her program was accepted by the TV station.
61	"Incómodos momentos"	7 September 2021	1.70
Sergio arrives home with a moving truck to get Alicia to vacate her house as soon as possible. Facundo tries to make Martín fight for Alicia's love. Moisés makes Yuri believe that he is a good person in order to make her fall in love again.
62	"Falsas declaraciones"	8 September 2021	1.76
Meche fears losing her job if Lucas confesses that he is Sergio's son. Sergio assures Julieta that he never had children out of wedlock. Sergio accuses Alicia of stealing his journalism award.
63	"Injusticias"	9 September 2021	1.65
Alicia believes that Martín abandoned her. Sergio manages to have Martín imprisoned. Yuri fears that Julieta will find out that Cholo is living in her house. Gonzalo tries to solve his problems with Lorena. Moisés discovers that Lucas is Sergio's son.
64	"Culpable o inocente"	10 September 2021	1.55
Julieta discovers that Cholo is living at Sergio's house. Yuri promises Martín that he will help him get out of jail. Lucas threatens Sergio to tell everyone that he is a swindler if he fires him from the foundation.
65	"Sin salida"	13 September 2021	1.82
Julieta asks Cholo to give her an interview to prove that he is not a murderer. Eva discovers that Quique is a criminal. Mujica is upset when he learns that Karina is responsible for Samuel's death.
66	"Malas compañías"	14 September 2021	1.62
With the help of his lawyer, Lucas makes a plan for Sergio to recognize him as his son. Julieta confesses to Mujica that she is responsible for the police capturing Cholo. El Cholo assures Martín that he did not kill his brother.
67	"Justicia"	15 September 2021	1.69
Yuri assures Moisés that El Cholo is her love. Yuri complains to Julieta for exposing her relationship with El Cholo. Yuri gives Mujica the evidence that proves that Martín is not a criminal. Mabe helps Martín to get out of jail.
68	"Nueva campaña"	16 September 2021	1.76
Alicia confronts Sergio and Julieta about the situation Yuri is going through. Meanwhile, Mabe seduces Martín in his celebration of his release.
69	"Amistad destruída"	17 September 2021	1.57
Alicia believes that Gonzalo and Fedora are in a relationship after finding them kissing. Sergio offers Prudencia a large sum of money in exchange for telling the press that Lucas is not his son.
70	"Humillaciones"	20 September 2021	1.87
After Sergio decides to end their relationship, Julieta falls into a deep depression. Martín invites Alicia to his house to spend the night together. Sergio demands Moisés to help him prevent Lucas from proving that he is his son.
71	"Nuevos enemigos"	21 September 2021	1.70
Moisés makes Cholo believe that Yuri agreed to marry him. Fedora suspects that Eva stole one of her most valuable jewels. Martín prepares his trip to Reynosa to find out about his brother's murder.
72	"Fiesta de cumpleaños arruinada"	22 September 2021	1.82
Alicia agrees to live at Rebeca's house. Sergio organizes a party for Miranda's birthday. Moises tells his family that he will soon marry Yuri. Lucas proves to the Carranzas that he is Sergio's son.
73	"Fuertes declaraciones"	23 September 2021	1.81
Alicia discovers that Prudencia was Sergio's lover. Lucas assures his siblings that Sergio always wanted to get rid of him and his mother. Julieta confesses to Sergio that she is expecting his child.
74	"Inesperada noticia"	24 September 2021	1.77
Sergio proposes to Julieta that she lose her baby to avoid ruining her life. Karina assures Alicia that Martín is being unfaithful to her. During the newscast, Julieta announces that she is pregnant.
75	"Falso delito"	27 September 2021	1.91
Julieta publicly announces that she is pregnant with Sergio's child. Yuri believes that Julieta's pregnancy is false. Martín asks Alicia to fight for their relationship. Gonzalo is accused of using drugs and because of this, his father suffers a heart attack.
76	"Prisionero de amor"	28 September 2021	1.87
Sergio faints after learning that Gonzalo is accused of drug trafficking. After the heart attack, Alicia tells Julieta that she has to take more care of Sergio. Sergio confesses to Alicia that he does not love Julieta. Moisés gets Gonzalo out of jail.
77	"Una nueva oportunidad para amar"	30 September 2021	1.77
Sergio asks Alicia to give him a chance to win back his love. Prudencia believes that because of Lucas' lawsuit, Sergio suffered a pre-infarction. Julieta goes to the hospital to see Sergio to complain about how badly his daughters treat her. Yuri discovers that she is pregnant. Martín and Mabe find a video that may be of help in freeing El Cholo.
78	"Fuerte confesión"	1 October 2021	1.87
Rebeca tries to kill Julieta when she sees her hitting Alicia. After learning that Toro killed his son, Facundo looks for a way to get revenge. Fedora shows Alicia a video in which Eva is stealing the money she had saved. Cholo learns that Yuri is expecting his child.
79	"En busca de la verdad"	4 October 2021	1.72
El Cholo refuses to believe that Yuri's son is his. Martin goes to look for Toro at his home to confront him about the death of his brother. Alicia accuses Eva of being a thief. Facundo suspects that Mujica is Toro's accomplice. El Toro asks Mujica to help him leave the country. Martín summons Yuri to talk about Cholo.
80	"Venganza de amor"	5 October 2021	1.74
Sergio decides to end his relationship with Julieta in order to rebuild his life with Alicia. Moisés fears that Yuri will discover that he is being unfaithful. Karina assures Cholo that he will soon be released from jail. Yuri asks Martín to fight for Alicia's love. Julieta interviews Lucas to find out the truth about his origin. The police manage to identify Nicole's phone from where Miranda's video was taken.
81	"Secuestro"	6 October 2021	1.83
Julieta presents Lucas' case nationally. Meanwhile, Moisés threatens Yuri after learning of her pregnancy. Sergio threatens Julieta with destroying her career as a journalist if she continues to accuse him of being a bad father. Martín fears that Toro will hurt Sofía after learning that he kidnapped her.
82	"Amenazas imperdonables"	8 October 2021	1.81
Moisés threatens Yuri to put Cholo in jail if she tries to call off their wedding. Sergio interviews Prudencia to prove to the viewers that he did not sexually abuse her.
83	"Sueños cumplidos"	11 October 2021	2.12
Yuri confesses in front of her family that she is expecting Cholo's child. After being fired from the TV station, Julieta reveals the deals that Sergio had with politicians to be benefited in his newscast. With the information, Sergio also ends up being fired. Alicia asks Lucas to turn himself in for his crimes. Yuri manages to get Cholo out of jail. Alicia decides to give love a chance with Martín. Martín becomes the new news anchor. Alicia fulfills her dream of becoming a writer. After receiving a standing ovation from the people who saw the play she created, Alicia invites Martín on stage to celebrate her triumph, while Sergio watches them from afar, completely regretful for his past actions.

== Reception ==
=== U.S. ratings ===
Viewership and ratings per season of Si nos dejan
Season	Timeslot (ET)	Episodes	First aired		Last aired		Avg. viewers (millions)
Season	Timeslot (ET)	Episodes	Date	Viewers (millions)	Date	Viewers (millions)	Avg. viewers (millions)
1	Mon–Fri 9:00 p.m.	83	1 June 2021	1.62	11 October 2021	2.12	1.61

=== Mexico ratings ===
Viewership and ratings per season of Si nos dejan
Season	Timeslot (CT)	Episodes	First aired		Last aired		Avg. viewers (millions)
Season	Timeslot (CT)	Episodes	Date	Viewers (millions)	Date	Viewers (millions)	Avg. viewers (millions)
1	Mon–Fri 9:30 p.m.	77	1 November 2021	3.4	20 February 2022	4.5	3.98

=== Critical response ===
Critics noted the telenovela's focus on the protagonist's divorce and subsequent independence as a departure from traditional melodramatic formulas. However, some reviewers pointed out that the series occasionally reverted to conventional pacing and tropes in its later episodes.

=== Awards and nominations ===
Year	Award	Category	Nominated	Result	Ref
2022	Produ Awards	Best Short Telenovela	Si nos dejan	Nominated	
2022	Produ Awards	Best Supporting Actor - Superseries or Telenovela	Roberto Mateos	Nominated	
