= Army of Shadows (TV series) =

Upcoming British-French thriller series

- Genre: Thriller
- Inspired by: Army of Shadows by: Joseph Kessel; Army of Shadows; Jean-Pierre Melville
- Written by: Ronan Bennett
- Directed by: Lisa Gunning
- Starring: America Ferrera; Paddy Considine; Kit Harington; Alex Hassell; Susan Sarandon; Olivia Colman
- Countries of origin: United Kingdom; France
- Original language: English

Production
- Executive producers: Paul Gilbert; M-K Kennedy; Ron Halpern; Joe Naftalin; Stephen Wright; Michael Jackson; Ronan Bennett
- Producer: Alison Sterling
- Production companies: StudioCanal; Two Cities Television

Original release
- Network: Channel 4 (United Kingdom); Canal+ (France)

Army of Shadows is an upcoming thriller television series written by Ronan Bennett. It is a reimagining of the Joseph Kessel novel and the 1969 film adaptation of the same name written and directed by Jean-Pierre Melville.

== Premise ==
The series depicts a secret resistance group in the near future United Kingdom that is under de facto American occupation.

== Cast ==
- America Ferrera
- Paddy Considine
- Kit Harington
- Alex Hassell
- Susan Sarandon
- Olivia Colman
- Leila Farzad
- Luther Ford
- Amara Okereke
- Patrick O'Kane
- Anjli Mohindra
- Edward Ashley
- Zoe Telford

== Production ==
=== Development ===
It was announced in August 2025 that Channel 4 and Canal+ had commissioned Army of Shadows, a television series inspired by the novel and the 1969 film of the same name, with Ronan Bennett serving as writer. Executive producers alongside Bennett are Paul Gilbert, M-K Kennedy, Ron Halpern, Joe Naftalin, Stephen Wright, Michael Jackson. Alison Sterling is the series producer. Lisa Gunning was tapped to direct all six episodes.

=== Casting ===
In July 2026, America Ferrera, Paddy Considine, Kit Harington, and Alex Hassell were cast to star in the series. In September, Susan Sarandon and Olivia Colman were among several new announced additions to the cast.

=== Filming ===
Production had begun in July 2026, with filming to occur across Manchester, Liverpool, London, and Paris. Scenes were shot at the Liverpool Town Hall the week of 3 August. Scenes were shot in Ashton-under-Lyne in early September, with production returning to Liverpool to film in Sefton Park later that month.
