= La Nocturna =

Colombian telenovela

- Genre: Telenovela
- Created by: Ana María Parra
- Written by: Ana María Parra; Diego Ezequiel Vivanco
- Directed by: Andrés Marroquín (seasons 1–2); Germán Porras (season 1); Mario Riberro (season 2)
- Creative directors: Guarnizo & Lizarralde
- Theme music composer: Mauricio Rengifo; Alejandro Rengifo; Alejandro González; Andrés Torres
- Opening theme: "La estrategia" by Cali y El Dandee
- Country of origin: Colombia
- Original language: Spanish
- No. of seasons: 2
- No. of episodes: 184

Production
- Executive producers: Juan Carlos Villamizar (season 1); Manuel Peñaloza (season 2)
- Editors: Wilmar Muñoz (season 1); José Luis Oróstegui (season 2)
- Camera setup: Multi-camera

Original release
- Network: Caracol Televisión
- Release: 24 May 2017 – 4 May 2020

La Nocturna (stylized onscreen as La Nocturna: Los sueños nunca duermen for the first season, and La Nocturna: Contigo aprendí for the second season), is a Colombian telenovela created by Diego Ezequiel Vivanco and Ana María Parra, from a screenplay by Ana María Parra. The series revolves around the student life of several characters who, due to circumstances of life, could never finish their dreams of having graduated from university, so everyone ends up attending Graham University, a night university where each of the characters will fulfill their dreams with the help of Esther (Marcela Carvajal) and Mario (Jorge Enrique Abello).

On 3 February 2018, Caracol Televisión confirmed that the series would be renewed for a second season. The production of the second season began in September 2019, and it premiered on 7 January 2020.

== Synopsis ==
=== Season 1 (2017) ===
The series revolves around millions of students in the world who turn to night education as the only way to get ahead. They will be represented by Amelia (Carolina Acevedo), Muriel (Jimena Durá), Luis Herney (José Daniel Cristancho), Faber (Jimmy Vásquez), Ingrid (Yuri Vargas), Germán (Ernesto Ballén), Alejandro (Manuel Prieto) and Doña Pilar (Consuelo Luzardo), who study a technical career at Graham University, with the illusion of fulfilling the dream of obtaining an academic degree that opens the doors in the labor market to improve their quality of life. These eight characters will find countless obstacles, personal and professional, that will test their ability to get ahead in the midst of family, work and economic obligations that they must overcome if they want to become future business managers. Amelia, mother and wife; Muriel, a former secretary; Luis Herney, former convict who works in a workshop; Germán, a peasant boy newly arrived in the city; Faber and Ingrid, two chefs who dream of creating their own restaurant and Doña Pilar, a woman of almost 70 years. They will meet every night in a classroom with the conviction that it is never too late to start over.

=== Season 2 (2020) ===
Mario (Jorge Enrique Abello) and Esther (Marcela Carvajal) return to La Graham another year to complete a new semester in which they plan to inaugurate a new career: Law. In the classrooms, the lives of seven students will be crossed: Don Mariano (César Mora), a retired accountant who feels that it is never too late to fulfill his dream of becoming a lawyer; Alberto (Juan Pablo Llano), escort of an important magistrate; Margarita (Marianne Schaller), mother and wife who wants to show that she can also be a great professional. El Tanque (Jaisson Jeack), a soccer player in the twilight of his career; Valery (Rosmeri Marval), an immigrant who arrives in the country in search of new opportunities; Karen (Michelle Orozco), a young woman who wants to do justice, and Cristian (Brian Moreno), a millennial who sees in Law the opportunity to earn money. In a country that tops the list with the largest number of lawyers in the world, La Graham students and professors will overcome personal, work and economic obstacles, with the dream of graduating from professionals who can improve justice that is not always favorable.

== Cast ==
=== Main ===
- Marcela Carvajal as Esther Chavellier Brandt
- Jorge Enrique Abello as Mario Quiñones Purcell
- Consuelo Luzardo as Doña Pilar Quezada de Linares (season 1)
- Carolina Acevedo as Amelia Ruiz Meluna (season 1)
- Yuri Vargas as Ingrid Acevedo (season 1)
- Jimmy Vásquez as Faber Salazar (season 1)
- Luis Mesa as Octavio Salgar (season 1)
- Carlos Manuel Vesga as José Hernando Osorio (season 1)
- Jimena Durán as Muriel Cáceres (season 1)
- Ernesto Ballén as Germán Jiménez Morales (season 1)
- Manuel Prieto as Alejandro Dangond / Rosaura Miranda (season 1)
- José Daniel Cristancho as Luis Herney Buitrago (season 1)
- Viviana Santos as Victoria "Vicky" Rodríguez (season 1)
- Sebastián Vega as Enrique "Kike" Posada (season 1)
- Antonio Gil as Ernesto Martínez (season 1)
- John Alex Toro as Willington Espinoza (season 2)
- César Mora as Mariano Garzón (season 2)
- Víctor Hugo Morant (season 2)
- Ángela Piedrahíta as Greici Domínguez (season 2)
- Rosmeri Marval as Valery Rosero (season 2)
- Brian Moreno as Cristian Mora (season 2)
- Eileen Moreno as Zayda Tacha (season 2)
- Liliana González (season 2)
- Martín Karpan as José María Collante (season 2)
- Juan Pablo Llano as Alberto Cruz (season 2)
- Marianne Schaller as Margarita Loaiza (season 2)
- Jaisson Jeack as Édgar "El Tanque" Durán (season 2)
- Michelle Orozco as Karen Tacha (season 2)

=== Recurring ===
- Carlos Andrés Ramírez as Ángel Osorio Ruíz
- Javier Ramírez as Raúl Saldarriaga
- Mario Ruiz as Alirio Jiménez
- Paula Barreto as Claudia López
- Juliette Pardau as Lucy

== Reception and criticism ==
=== Season 1 ===
The first episode of the telenovela averaged a total of 7.5 million viewers, thus obtaining fifth place as the least-watched show in Colombia. Despite having obtained a lower average than expected from the telenovela, over the months he managed to improve his average. The final episode obtained a total of 12.0 million viewers, thus becoming the most watched program on 31 October 2017, and occupying the first place in the Caracol Televisión productions and nationwide. The Eligio Palacio website, compared production with others such as Francisco el matemático. He also praised the stories of the characters and the dialogues, stating that the series was reminiscent of the works of Bernardo Romero Pereiro. While the newspaper El Espectador, he emphasized it as "An endearing telenovela". For its part, the Entretengo portal described it as "the best of 2017", after confirming a second season, the portal stressed that it was unnecessary to do another season, indicating that "The second parts have never been good".

== Television rating ==
Viewership and ratings per season of La Nocturna
Season	Episodes	First aired		Last aired		Avg. viewers (millions)	18–49 rank
Season	Episodes	Date	Viewers (millions)	Date	Viewers (millions)	Avg. viewers (millions)	18–49 rank
1	105	24 May 2017	7.5	31 October 2017	12.0	TBD	TBD
2	79	7 January 2020	5.4	4 May 2020	TBD	TBD	TBD
