= Jorge Enrique Abello =

Colombian actor

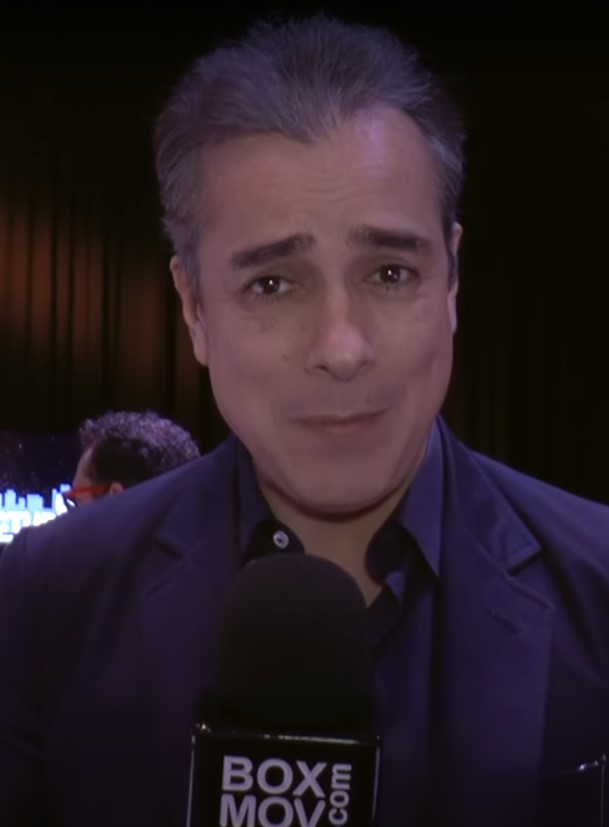
- Jorge Enrique Abello in 2017
- Born: Jorge Enrique Abello Moreno; 28 February 1968 (age 58); Bogotá, Colombia
- Occupation: Actor
- Years active: 1996–present

Jorge Enrique Abello Moreno (born 28 February 1968) is a Colombian actor.

Abello has performed roles in telenovelas, such as: the original version of La viuda de Blanco (The Widow in white) 1996, as "Dr. Dimas Pantoja", opposite Yolandita Monge as "Haydée Blanco", Las Ejecutivas (The Executives) 1996, La mujer en el espejo (The Woman in the Mirror) 1997, Perro amor (Dog Love) 1998, and the leading man in the original version of Yo soy Betty, la fea (I am Betty, the ugly) 1999, opposite leading lady Ana Maria Orozco, Julius 1999, Eco moda (Echo Fashion) 2001, La Costeña y el Cachaco (The coastal girl and the city guy) (2003), Anita no te rajes (Anita don't screw up) 2004, opposite leading lady Ivonne Montero & Merlina, Mujer Divina (2005–06) and En los tacones de Eva (In Eva's heels) (2006), he worked as well in the telenovela Aquí no hay quien viva (no one could live here) in 2008 playing the role of Fernando; this has been his first foreign work. Later on in 2010 he worked in the Colombian version of Greys Anatomy A corazón abierto, as Mauricio Hernandez, the Colombian role for Mark Sloan. Finally in 2012 he played the role of Cristobal in the telenovela ¿Dónde está Elisa? (Where is Elisa?).

== Filmography ==
Films and television
Year	Title	Role	Notes
1996	Las ejecutivas		Television debut
1997	La mujer en el espejo	Camilo Linares	
1998	Perro amor	Diego Tamayo	Lead role
1999-2001	Yo soy Betty, la fea	Armando Mendoza Sáenz	Lead role
1999	Julius, un mundo de sentimientos	Arquitécto	
2001	Ecomoda	Armando Mendoza Sáenz	
2003	La costeña y el Cachaco	Antonio Andrade	Lead role
2004	¡Anita, no te rajes!	Eduardo Contreras	
2006	Merlina mujer divina	Damián Ángel	
2006	En los tacones de Eva	Juan Camilo / Eva María León Jaramillo Viuda de Zuloaga	Lead role
2008	Aquí no hay quien viva	Fernando	Co-lead role
2010	A corazón abierto	Mauricio Hernández	
2012	Aquí no hay quien viva	Fernando	Co-lead role
2013	Crimen con vista al mar	Enrique Zabaleta	Film
2014	Kids Choice Awards Colombia 2014	Himself	Host
2017	La nocturna	Mario Quiñones	Lead role
2023	Ana de nadie	Horacio Valenzuela	
2024	Betty, la fea: la historia continúa	Armando Mendoza Sáenz	
