= Natalia Streignard =

Venezuelan actress (born 1970)

Natalia Martínez-Streignard
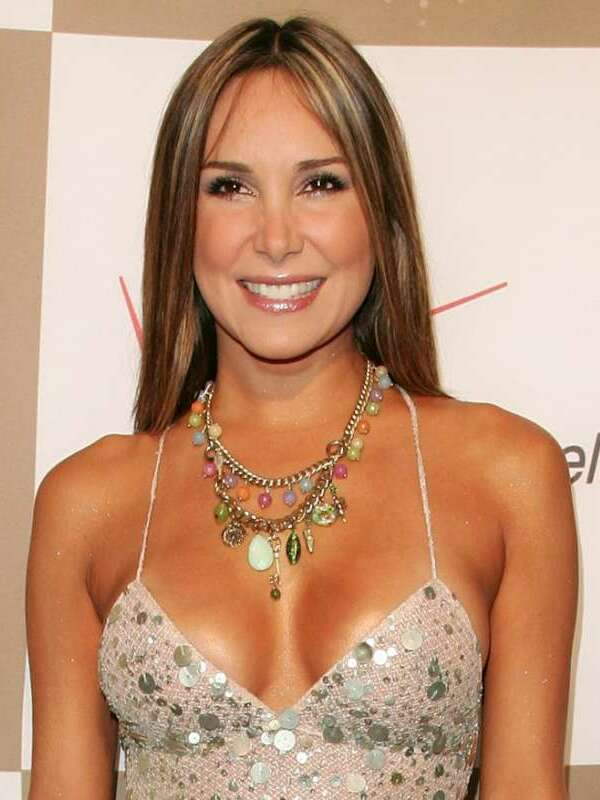
- Martínez-Streignard in 2007
- Born: Natalia Martínez-Streignard y Negri; September 9, 1970 (age 55); Madrid, Spain
- Occupation: Actress
- Years active: 1992–2009
- Spouses: Mario Cimarro (1999–2006); Donato Calandriello (m. 2008)
- Children: 3

Natalia Martínez-Streignard y Negri (born September 9, 1970) is a Venezuelan actress and beauty pageant titleholder who competed at Miss Venezuela 1992. Natalia is best known for her work in successful telenovelas such as El Juramento with Osvaldo Rios, La mujer de mi vida, with ex-spouse Mario Cimarro, Mi destino eres tu with Lucero and Jorge Salinas, and La Tormenta with Christian Meier, in the most famous telenovelas productions of Televisa, Venevision and Telemundo.

== Personal life ==
On June 10, 1999, Streignard married Cuban actor Mario Cimarro, whom she met in 1998 on the set of "La mujer de mi vida". In 2006, Streignard and Cimarro separated and then filed for divorce.

In 2008, she met Donato Calandriello, an Italian businessman. They married on 27 September 2008. They have three children.

== Filmography ==
Year	Title	Role	Notes
2008	El Juramento	Andrea Robles Conde de Landeros	Main role
2005-2007	Decisiones	Laura/Raquel	1 episode
2005	La Tormenta	María Teresa Montilla	Main role
2004	¡Anita, no te rajes!	Ariana Dupont Aristizábal de Contreras	Main cast
2002–2003	Mi Gorda Bella	Valentina Villanueva Lanz de Villanueva/Bella de la Rosa Montiel	Main role
2001	La Niña de Mis Ojos	Isabel Díaz Antoni	Main role
2001	Soledad	Deborah Gutiérrez	
2000	Mi destino eres tú	Sofía Devesa Leyva	
1998	La mujer de mi vida	Barbarita Ruiz de Montesinos	Main role
1996	Sol de Tentacion	Sol Romero	Main role
1995	Dulce enemiga	María Laura Andueza	Main cast
1993	Pedacito de Cielo	Angelina	Main role
