= Laura Termini =

Venezuelan-American actress

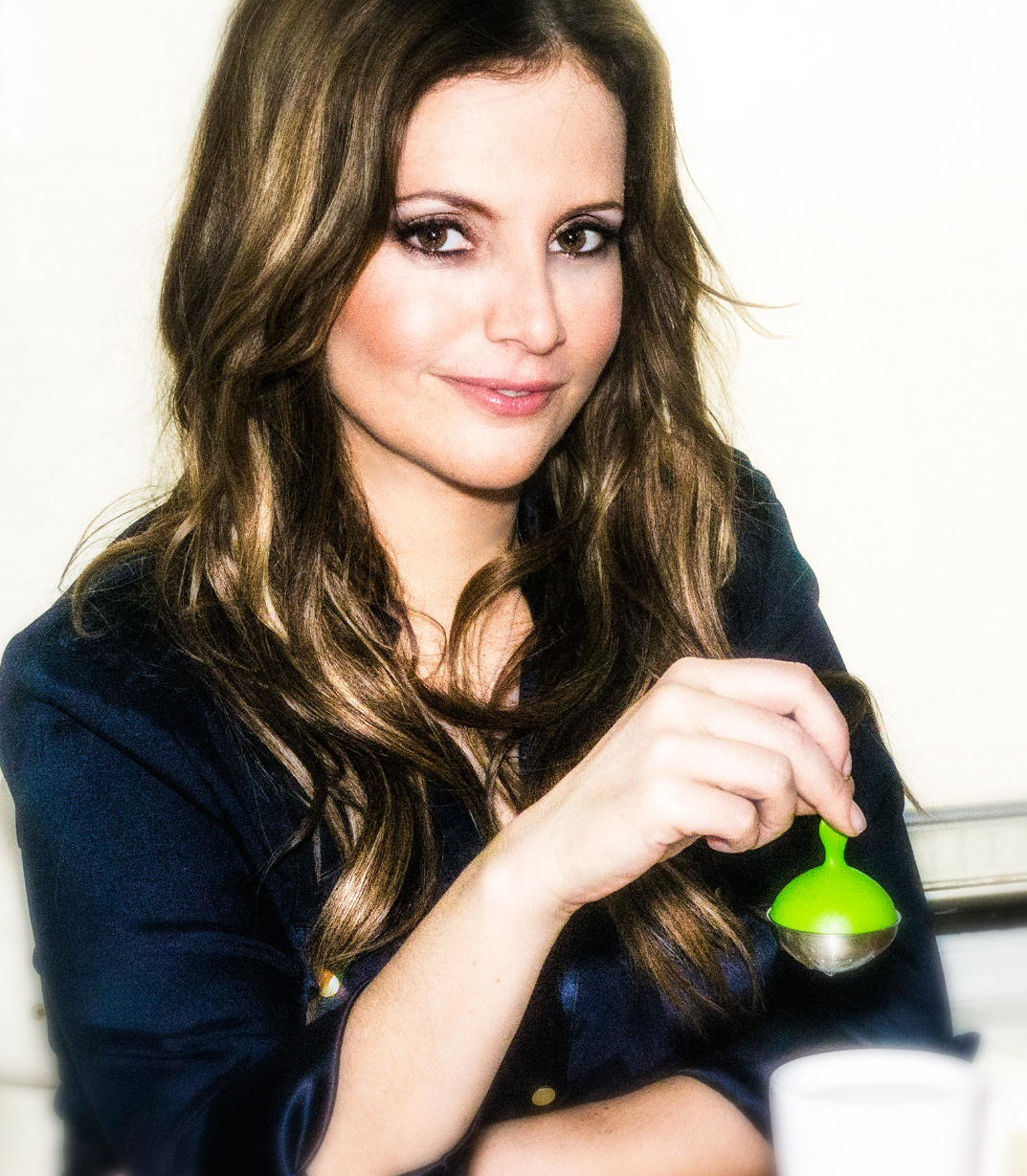
- Born: Laura Cristina Termini; August 3, 1974 (age 51); Caracas, Venezuela
- Occupations: Actress, TV producer, writer

Laura Termini (born August 3, 1974) is a Venezuelan actress, producer, writer, and a Board Certified Health/Beauty Counselor AADP. She is also a contributor to Huffington Post's health and beauty columns. Termini has starred on networks such as Telemundo, Univision, Venevisión, Azteca América. In the world of dubbing, she is best known for being the first voice of Tootie in Latin Spanish in The Fairly OddParents, whom she dubbed in seasons 2 and 3. She was invited to the White House for recognition of her contribution to wellness as one of the Top Latina Bloggers in America. Termini was also one of the Spanish-language voices in President Obama's 2008 Presidential Campaign.

== Early life ==
Termini was born to a Mexican actress Maria Rosa Compañet and an Italian singer Franco Termini. They married in Mexico and moved to Venezuela, where Termini was born. She studied at an American college for a year and moved back and forth between the United States and Venezuela. She has now been living permanently in the United States for over 14 years.

== Career ==
=== Acting ===
At the age of 5, Termini started appearing in various advertisements and was also a singer and dancer in the group The Mini Pops, from a national TV show Sábado Sensacional for 8 years. Until the age of 17, she had starred in almost 20 soap operas on local network. Her record song Laura & Victor sold more than 100,000 copies and was on the Venezuelan Billboard.

After moving to the United States, she continued to appear in the American Spanish soap operas such as Los teens, Amor Descarado, and Anita no te Rajes. She had also appeared as the main characters in the TV movies De Rodillas, Mea culpa. In 2009, she hosted an award-winning radio show Tu mañana for SBS Broadcast radio.

=== Blogging ===
In 2009, Laura began her own Health and Beauty Lifestyle brand called Natural, Organic & Latina, Chicanol.com, in addition to be Salud aL Día and a health columnist for the Huffington Post among others. She is also a Board Certified Health/Beauty Counselor AADP.

== Filmography ==
Year	Title	Role
1985	El sol sale para todos	
1985	Las amazonas	Lalita
1994	Guadalupe	Marilyn
1996	Como tú, ninguna	Uncredited
1998	María Celina	Rocío Ferrante
1999	Me muero por tí	
2001	Radio Pirata	Lucy
2003	Amor descarado	Miriyam
2004	¡Anita, no Te Rajes!	Maggie O'Donnell
2008	Mea Culpa	Maggie
2008	De rodillas	Jenny
2013	Madre Mia	Francis Telamente
