= María Eugenia Rodríguez (model) =

- Born: María Eugenia Rodríguez Noguera; 1973 (age 52–53); Maracay, Aragua, Venezuela
- Height: 1.80 m (5 ft 11 in)
- Beauty pageant titleholder
- Hair color: Light Brown
- Eye color: Brown

María Eugenia Rodríguez Noguera is a Venezuelan model and beauty pageant titleholder. She is the Miss Venezuela International titleholder for 1992 and was the official representative of Venezuela to the Miss International 1992 pageant held in Tokyo, Japan, when she classified in the Top 15 semifinalists.

Rodríguez competed in the national beauty pageant Miss Venezuela 1992 and obtained the title of Miss Venezuela International. She represented the Portuguesa state.

Preceded by Niurka Acevedo	Miss Venezuela International; 1992	Succeeded by Faviola Spitale
