= Olvidarte jamás =

- Created by: Venevisión
- Developed by: Venevisión International; Univision
- Starring: Sonya Smith; Gabriel Porras
- Opening theme: "Olvidarte Jamas" by Pablo Montero
- Ending theme: "Olvidarte Jamas" by Pablo Montero
- Countries of origin: Venezuela; United States
- Original language: Spanish
- No. of episodes: 118

Production
- Production locations: Miami, Florida
- Camera setup: Multicamera
- Running time: 42 minutes

Original release
- Network: Venevisión; Univision
- Release: January 9 – June 7, 2006

Related
- Acorralada

Olvidarte jamás (Always on my Mind) is a 2005 telenovela made by Venevision International in Miami that lasted 118 episodes. The telenovela starred Venezuelan-American actress Sonya Smith and Mexican actor Gabriel Porras. The telenovela was written by Veronica Suarez and Omaira Rivero. It was executively produced by Peter Tinoco and Ana Teresa Arizmendi. It aired on Univision in the United States. The theme song "Olvidarte Jamas" (I Am Not Going To Forget You) was sung by Mexican singer Pablo Montero.

== Synopsis ==
Beautiful Victoria has spent 20 years carrying the weight of an unforgivable wrong done to her and waiting for the perfect moment to get even. When she was just a teenager, poor and naive, she was deceived and seduced by Gonzalo Montero, son of Don Gregorio - the ruthless owner of the ranch where she worked as a peasant, and became pregnant. However, thanks to Gonzalo's infuriated wife, Gladis, who gave Victoria a violent beating, Victoria suffered a miscarriage. Since then, Victoria, who at the time was known by her real name, Luisa, has been obsessed with making the Monteros pay for her pain.

Now a stunning, rich and mature woman, Luisa/Victoria returns to Florida from California (the series was not really shot there) with her adopted daughter, in search of revenge. She begins by getting a job at the Montero ranch, where Gonzalo, Gladis and Don Gregorio are all immediately intrigued by her, as she uncannily reminds them of someone they would rather forget.

However, vengeance doesn't come as easily as Victoria thought, since she never expected love to interfere with her plans. When she meets Diego, a landowner neighbor of the Monteros, it's love at first sight for both. While tough and inflexible on the surface, Diego is really just a bitter man, a victim of a great injustice, in desperate need of affection for which Victoria is willing to give him without bounds. To complicate matters even more, Victoria's daughter, Carolina, finds true love in Alejandro, Gonzalo Montero's son, making Carolina the cousin of Alejandro.

Victoria realizes that if she wants lasting happiness for herself and her daughter, she must finally let go of the hatred she feels for the Monteros, in spite of the fact that they continue hounding her even today. Will she be able to? What will win out in the end: her unflinching desire for revenge, or the power of love?.

== Cast ==
=== Main cast ===
Actor	Character	Known as
Sonya Smith	Luisa Dominguez / Victoria Salinas	Main heroine, adoptive mother of Carolina, in love with Diego
Gabriel Porras	Diego Ibarra	Main hero, in love with Victoria
Martha Julia	Lucrecia Montero	Villain. Daughter of Gregorio, ends in psychiatric clinic
Mariana Torres	Carolina	Adopted daughter of Victoria, daughter of Florencia, in love with Alejandro
Daniel Elbittar	Alejandro Montero	Son of Gladis and Gonzalo, in love with Carolina
Guillermo Murray	Gregorio Montero	Father of Gonzalo, Florencia, Constanza, Lucrecia and Miguel, killed by Gladis
Sebastián Ligarde	Gonzalo Montero	Villain. Son of Gregorio, husband of Gladis
Karen Sentíes	Gladis Montero	Villain. Wife of Gonzalo, mother of Alejandro
Maite Embil	Florencia Montero	Daughter of Gregorio, wife of Martin, mother of Carolina.
Fernando Carrera	Martín de la Nuéz	Artist, husband of Florencia, father of Patricio, friend of Diego, killed by Macario
Elizabeth Gutiérrez	Isabella	Villain. Former prostitute, girlfriend of Alejandro, in love with Patricio, killed by Renato
Paulo César Quevedo	Patricio de la Nuéz	Villain. Son of Martín
Brenda Bezares	Constanza Montero de Terán	Daughter of Gregorio, mother of Gerardo and Bianca
Félix Loreto	Rubén Terán	Husband of Constanza, father of Gerardo and Bianca
Javier Armenteros	Gerardo	Son of Constanza and Rubén
Taniusha Capote	Bianca	Daughter of Constanza and Rubén, in love with Claudio
Rodrigo Vidal	Miguel Montero	Son of Gregorio
Héctor Soberón	Renato Tuluz	Villain. Father of Alejandro
Carmen Daysi Rodríguez	Crista	Villain. Lover of Renato
Adela Romero	Martina	Villain. Maid in Gregorio's house
Carla Rodríguez	Amalia	Friend of Carolina, in love with Germán
Carlos Miguel Caballero	Macario	Villain.
Gloria Zapata	Flora Ibarra	Aunt of Diego
Hilda Luna	Rocío	Maid in Gregorio's house
Yaskin Santalucía	Claudio	Friend of Diego, in love with Bianca
Julio Capote	Salvador "Chema"	Friend of Gregorio and Lencha
Marisela Buitrago	María	Cook in Diego's house, friend of Victoria
Roberto Levermann	Edelmiro	In love with Rocío
William Levy	Germán Torres	Friend of Diego, in love with Amalia

=== Secondary Cast ===
- Eduardo Linares .... Vicente "Chente"
- Candice Michelle .... Layla
- Angel Nodal
- Andhy Mendez
- Ariel Texido - detective
- Brigitte Kali Canales
- Carlos Guerrero .... Manuel
- Enrique Arredondo
- Ernesto Rivas .... Valentín - detective
- Fidel Perez Michel - police officer
- Freddy Viquez .... Samuel- friend of Lucrecia
- Gabriel Morales .... young Alejandro Montero
- Guadalupe Hernández.... El Pastelero
- Hada Bejar .... Lencha Dominguez - grandmother of Luisa
- Johnny Nessy
- Juan Troya .... Ocampo - attorney
- Konstantino Vrotsos .... young Miguel
- Miguel Gutierrez .... Ramon - doctor
- Pablo Montero - singer
- Vicente Passariello - bodyguard of Renato
- Víctor Corona .... Santos
- Virginia Loreto
- William Colmenares .... El Verdugo
- Héctor Eduardo González.... Public Minister.

== Sources ==
- Series Now - Olivdarte Jamas
- Olvidarte Jamás at Internet Movie Database
