= Amor Descarado =

- Genre: Romance, Comedy drama, Telenovela
- Created by: Delia Betancourt and Roberto Stopello
- Developed by: Telemundo Studios; RTI Producciones
- Directed by: David Posada; Sergio Osorio
- Starring: José Ángel Llamas; Bárbara Mori; Ivonne Montero; Victor González
- Opening theme: Amor descarado performed by Los Tucanes de Tijuana
- Countries of origin: United States; Colombia
- Original language: Spanish
- No. of episodes: 125

Production
- Executive producer: Aurelio Valcárcel Carroll
- Producer: Patricio Wills
- Production location: Miami, Florida
- Camera setup: Multi-camera
- Running time: 42 minutes

Original release
- Network: Telemundo
- Release: September 8, 2003 – March 19, 2004

Amor Descarado (Barefaced Love) is a telenovela produced by RTI Producciones and Spanish-language United States–based television network Telemundo, this is a US Hispanic version of Chilean telenovela Amores de Mercado. It was broadcast by Telemundo on September 8, 2003, and ended on March 19, 2004. This telenovela was aired in eight countries around the world.

== Cast ==
- José Ángel Llamas as Pedro 'Pelluco' Solís / Rodolfo Fuentemayor
- Bárbara Mori as Fernanda Lira
- Ivonne Montero as Betsabe Galdames
- Víctor González as Ignacio Valdez. Main villain. Ends in jail, because tried to kill Rodolfo
- Roberto Ahumada Murillo as Martin Lira
- Isela Vega as Nora
- Lupita Ferrer as Morgana Atal. Villain. Stays alone.
- José Bardina as Mr. Clinton
- Gabriela Roel as Matilde García
- Veranetthe Lozano as Elena Rivas "Chamoyada"
- Riccardo Dalmacci as Epigmenio "Chamoy" Solís. Villain. Goes to jail
- Roberto Moll as Camilo Fuentemayor
- Joaquín Garrido as Eliodoro Galdames
- Mara Croatto as Chantal Burgos
- Jeannette Lehr as Pastora Alicia Rubilar
- Virna Flores as Jennifer Rebolledo
- José Luis Franco as Guadalupe “Lupe”
- Paulo César Quevedo as Jonathan Muñoz
- Verónica Terán as Mónica Peralta
- Pedro Moreno as Rubén García
- Mónica Guzmán as Esmeralda Peralta
- Silvana Arias as Constanza 'Coni' Valdez
- Mariana Huerdo as Topacio Peralta
- Kenya Hijuelos as Yesenia Solís
- Melvin Cabrera as Abel Galdames Rubilar
- Christian Tapán as Basilio Concha
- Laura Termini as Miryam
- Alexa Kuve as Ivonne Altamira
- Roberto Levermann as Homero Silva
- Carla Rodríguez as Vicky
- Josué Gutierrez as Bernardo
- Gladys Cáceres as Corina
- Adrián Mas as Dino
- Rolando Tarajano as Ciego Ahumada
- Sabas Malaver as Poncio
- Chao as Pérez Peña
- Gabriel Parisi as Gustavo
- Sergio March as Jose Maria
- Juan Marquez as Bartender
- Elka Peterson as Store Clerk
