= Pedacito de cielo =

- Created by: Marte TV
- Starring: Natalia Streignard; Julio Pereira
- Country of origin: Venezuela
- Original language: Spanish
- No. of episodes: 77

Production
- Production location: Caracas
- Running time: 45 minutes

Original release
- Network: Marte TV
- Release: 1993 – 1993

Related
- Sirena; El paseo de la gracia de Dios

Pedacito de cielo (Little Piece of Heaven) is a Venezuelan telenovela which starred Natalia Streignard and Julio Pereira. It was produced and broadcast on Marte TV in 1993.

== Synopsis ==
The angel Angelina falls in love with Sebastian Henriquez, a worldly man. Sebastian is plotting to avenge his fathers death by marrying the daughter of his enemies who seized control of his father's toy factory after his death. Angelina was sent to Earth on a divine mission to ensure the birth of a miraculous child by finding two young lovers. The romantic relationship between Angelina and Sebastian threatens to ruin both of their endeavors.

The narrative includes themes of hopeless romance, malevolence, ambition, drama, and humor.

== Cast ==
- Natalia Streignard
- Julio Pereira
- Julie Restifo
- Beatriz Fuentes
- Raquel Castaño
- Rebeca Aleman as Libia Rossi
- Javier Valcarcel
