= Miss Venezuela 1992 =

39th edition of the Miss Venezuela competition

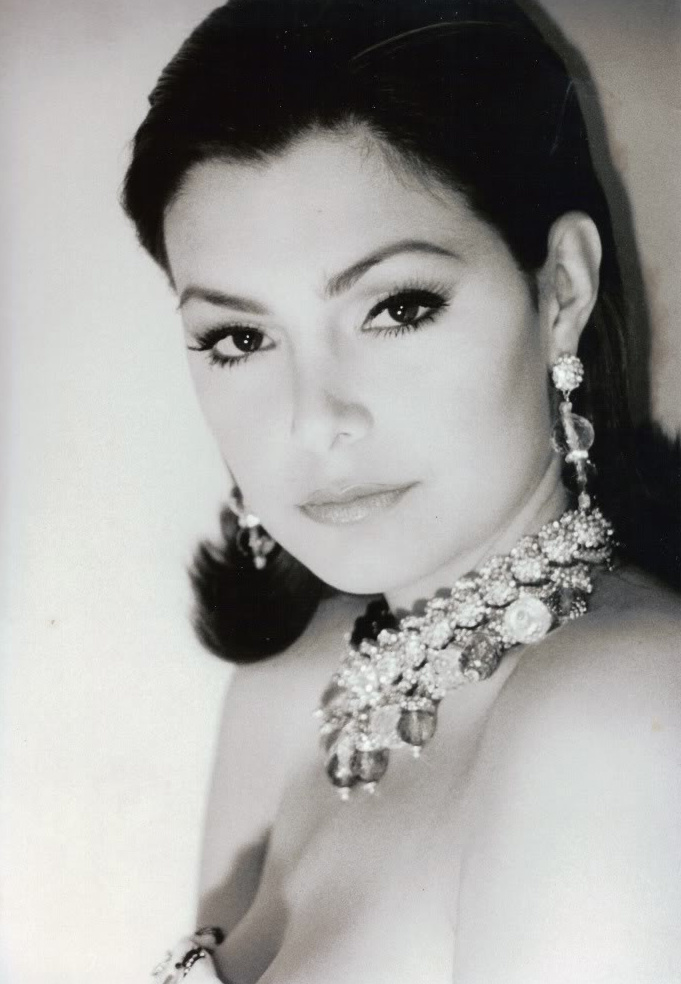
- Milka Chulina
- Date: September 9, 1992
- Presenters: Gilberto Correa; Bárbara Palacios
- Entertainment: Celia Cruz, Isabel Pantoja, Ricardo Montaner, Oscar D'León, Kiara, Floria Márquez
- Venue: Poliedro de Caracas, Caracas
- Broadcaster: Venevision
- Entrants: 30
- Placements: 8
- Winner: Milka Chulina; Aragua
- Congeniality: Delia Hernández; Amazonas
- Photogenic: Milka Chulina; Aragua

Miss Venezuela 1992 was the 39th Miss Venezuela pageant, was held in Caracas, Venezuela on September 9, 1992, after weeks of events. The winner of the pageant was Milka Chulina, Miss Aragua.

The pageant was broadcast live on Venevision from the Poliedro de Caracas in Caracas, Venezuela. At the conclusion of the final night of competition, outgoing titleholder Carolina Izsak, crowned Milka Chulina as the new Miss Venezuela.

== Results ==
=== Placements ===
Placement	Contestant
Miss Venezuela 1992	Aragua – Mika Yelisava Chulina
Miss Venezuela World 1992	Bolívar – Francis del Valle Gago
Miss Venezuela International 1992	Portuguesa – María Eugenia Rodríguez
1st Runner-Up	Zulia – Nelitza León
2nd Runner-Up	Miranda – Natalia Streignard
3rd Runner-Up	Barinas – Vanessa Mittermayer
4th Runner-Up	Carabobo – Laura Gaerste
5th Runner-Up	Mérida – Michelle Badillo

=== Special awards ===
Award	Contestant
Miss Elegance	Delta Amacuro – Pilar Martínez
Most Beautiful Eyes	Zulia – Nelitza León
Best Smile	Bolívar – Francis Gago

== Contestants ==
The Miss Venezuela 1992 delegates are:

- Miss Amazonas - Delia Esperanza Hernández Bolívar
- Miss Anzoátegui - Dayana Coromoto Maltese González
- Miss Apure - Michelle Rivers Peñaloza
- Miss Aragua - Milka Yelisava Chulina Urbanich
- Miss Barinas - Vanessa Beatríz Mittermayer Varguillas
- Miss Bolívar - Francis del Valle Gago Aponte
- Miss Canaima - Tibisay Carolina Navarro Colmenares
- Miss Carabobo - Laura María Gaerste Chaparro
- Miss Cojedes - Mariana López Attanasi
- Miss Costa Oriental - Marián Cassandra Urdaneta Villalobos
- Miss Delta Amacuro - Pilar Martínez Caicedo
- Miss Dependencias Federales - Grisel Massó Cásares
- Miss Distrito Federal - María Cristina Alvarez Gutiérrez
- Miss Falcón - María Alexandra Gámez García
- Miss Guárico - Gabriela Elena Spanic Utrera
- Miss Lara - María Fernanda Briceño
- Miss Mérida - Michelle Coromoto Badillo Páez
- Miss Miranda - Natalia Martínez Streignard-Negri
- Miss Monagas - Pierangela Marinucci Feliciani
- Miss Municipio Libertador - Maria Daniela Medina
- Miss Municipio Vargas - Jezebel Shirley Rabbe Ramírez
- Miss Nueva Esparta - Zulime Yelitza Regnault González
- Miss Península Goajira - Maria Luisa Fernández Parra
- Miss Península de Paraguaná - Liliana Karina Cedeño Rosas
- Miss Portuguesa - Maria Eugenia Rodríguez Noguera
- Miss Sucre - Hevis Scarlet Ortiz Pacheco
- Miss Táchira - Andrea Codriansky Strange
- Miss Trujillo - Luz Marina Belandria
- Miss Yaracuy - Adriana González Pérez
- Miss Zulia - Nelitza Rosa León Ramos
