= La mujer de mi vida (Venezuelan TV series) =

Venezuelan telenovela

- Created by: Mariela Romero
- Directed by: José Antonio Ferrara
- Starring: Natalia Streignard; Mario Cimarro; Lorena Meritano; Anna Silvetti
- Theme music composer: Piero Cassano; José Luis "Caplís" Chacín; Ricardo Montaner
- Opening theme: "La mujer de mi vida" by Ricardo Montaner
- Ending theme: "La mujer de mi vida" by Ricardo Montaner
- Countries of origin: Venezuela; United States
- Original language: Spanish
- No. of episodes: 150

Production
- Executive producer: Alfredo Schwarz
- Production locations: Miami, Florida
- Running time: 45 minutes

Original release
- Network: Venevisión; Univision
- Release: 22 September 1998 – 17 March 1999

Related
- Enamorada; La revancha (2000 TV series)

La mujer de mi vida (The Woman of My Life) is a 1998 telenovela co-produced by Venezuelan television company Venevisión in conjunction with the Miami-based production company Fonovideo.

Natalia Streignard and Mario Cimarro starred as the main protagonists while Lorena Meritano and Anna Silvetti starred as the main villains.

== History ==
From September 23, 1998 to March 17, 1999, Venevisión aired La mujer de mi vida, replacing Samantha, with Calypso replacing it.

From October 26, 1998 to May 28, 1999, Univision aired La mujer de mi vida weekday afternoons at 2 pm/1c, replacing Destino de mujer. The last episode was broadcast on May 28 at 2 pm/1c, with Una luz en el camino replacing it. From November 27, 2001 to April 13, 2002, Univision broadcast reruns of La mujer de mi vida every Tuesday mornings to Saturday mornings at 2 am/1c. From April 16 to May 23, 2002, 2 hour reruns of La mujer de mi vida were broadcast at 1 am/12c, replacing María la del barrio.

== Plot ==
Barbarita Ruiz (Natalia Streignard) is a sweet and modest young woman who works in a fashion boutique in Miami. One day, as part of her job as a seamstress, she goes to the mansion of the rich widow Ricarda Thompson (Anna Silvetti) to do a dress fitting for her. There, she meets her older son Valentino, a single and dishonest man who is always used to getting what he wants. On seeing Barbarita, he is captivated by her beauty and plans on seducing her. But, after spending time with her and getting to know her good nature, he falls in love with her, much to the dismay of her mother who is opposed to the relationship and who goes to great lengths in order to separate the two. However, Barbarita and Valentino get married in a simple and private wedding ceremony.

But on the wedding night, while on their way back from their honey moon hotel, the newlyweds are involved in a car accident that leads to the unfortunate death of Valentino while Barbarita survives with a few bruises. Valentino's powerful mother blames Barbarita for the death of her son, and she creates a cruel plan in order to get revenge: her younger son Antonio Adolfo (Mario Cimarro) will seduce Barbarita; and when she falls in love with him, he will abandon her.

Antonio plans on following her mother's plan to the letter. When Barbarita is convinced that she is truly in love with Antonio, he breaks her heart by revealing the truth that he was only using her to get revenge. Antonio later regrets this action when he discovers that he has fallen madly in love with Barbarita after witnessing her kindness and sweet nature. When Barbarita discovers that she is pregnant with Antonio's child, the two reconcile and become close, their love growing stronger every day.

However, things become complicated for the two when Valentino suddenly reappears back in their lives. He was not actually dead, but rather, he faked his death so that it was not discovered that he had embezzled his family's company fortune. Moreover, Antonio Adolfo was previously engaged to Alexandra Montesinos (Lorena Meritano), the spoilt daughter of a prominent lawyer who is overcome with jealousy and will do anything to ensure that Antonio is hers alone.

Valentino comes back with Katiuska Cardona (Mara Croatto), his former lover who is now posing as his personal nurse. Valentino tries to rebuild his life with his wife and new-born son, but the love Barbarita felt for him has been replaced by the love of his brother. Katiuska becomes increasingly jealous of Barbarita, and after Valentino fails to carry out their scheme of stealing from the Thompsons, she shoots him and frames Barbarita for the crime.

While in prison, it is discovered that Barbarita is legitimate daughter of Severo Montesinos (German Barrios) and Emilia Sulbaran. Emilia's father was opposed to the relationship she had with Severo, and when her baby was born, he gave the child to her nanny who then escaped to the United States from Caracas with the child. All this time, Caridad lied to Barbarita that she was her aunt and that her parents died in a car accident. Also, Emilia has come to the United States to search for her long-lost daughter. Severo is devastated when he discovers that Barbarita is his daughter after he treated her cruelly while he was the leading Prosecutor in her murder case. Her life ruined and her son taken away from her, Barbarita swears revenge against the Thompsons.

On the day that some of the inmates, including Barbarita, are being transported to the main State Prison, a planned escape by some of those inmates gives her the chance to run away. Barbarita is pronounced to be dead when her body isn't found after one of the inmates who was eventually caught stated that she had jumped into a canal filled with crocodiles. Her family, and especially Antonio, are devastated. Actually, Barbarita found solace in the house of her Criminal Defense lawyer Fernando Marín where she hides until her case is appealed and overturned after a witness comes forth and clears her because he gives her an alibi.

With her name cleared, Barbarita returns to her family after she is exonerated. With help from Larry Garcia who has now become a rich man and the fortune of the Thompsons which was put under her name through the help of her lawyer after the Thompson's company became fully bankrupt, Barbarita transforms herself into a sophisticated woman and goes to exact her revenge on the Thompsons who are completely shocked to see that she is actually alive.

== Cast ==
- Natalia Streignard as Barbarita Ruiz, daughter of Emilia and Severo, sister of Alexandra, Caridad's niece and Suzy's cousin, likes then hates Katiuska, loves Antonio Adolfo, mother of Tinito, marries Antonio Adolfo.
- Mario Cimarro as Antonio Adolfo Thompson, youngest son of Ricarda, brother of Valentino, biological son of Santiago, loves then hates Alexandra, loves Barbarita, father of Tinito, marries Barbarita.
- Lorena Meritano as Alexandra Montesinos, Main Villain oldest daughter of Severo, sister of Barbarita, loves Antonio Adolfo, hates Barbarita and Katiuska, aunt of Tinito, ends up in a mental clinic.
- Anna Silveti as Ricarda Thompson, Main Villain, mother of Valentino and Antonio Adolfo, likes then hates Katiuska and Alexandra, hates then likes Barbarita, grandmother of Tinito, later becomes good.
- Mara Croatto as Katiuska Cardona, Villain, good friend of Emilia, loves Valentino, hates then likes Barbarita, hates Ricarda, kills Valentino by shooting him with a gun, ends up in jail.
- Lili Renteria as Emilia Sulbaran, Barbarita's mother, Santiago's friend, Freddy's adopted mother
- Gellerman Baralt as Valentino Thompson, son of Ricarda, brother of Antonio, Barbarita's ex-husband, Tinito's father, Katiuska's lover. Shot in the stomach by Katiuska.
- Nury Flores as Caridad Ruiz, Barbarita's nanny/aunt, Suzy's mother
- German Barrios as Severo Montesinos, Barbarita's and Alexandra's father
- Claudia Reyes as Jessica Duarte Garcia, Renato's wife, Larry's sister-in-law
- Carlos Cuervo as Larry Garcia, Renato's brother, in love with Barbarita. Shot in the chest by Alexandra to prevent the bullet from hitting Barbarita.
- Marcela Cardona as Susy Ruiz
- Ivon D'Liz as Chella
- Omar Moynelo as Santiago, Antonio's biological father, Emilia's old friend, was in love with Ricarda
- Orlando Casin as Pipo
- Rosa Felipe as 'la nana'
- Humberto Rossenfeld as Renato Garcia, Larry's brother, Lola's son, Jessica's husband.
- Steve Roth as Esteban Sotomayor, businessman and ranch owner, Alexandra's former lover.
- Fernando Carrerra as Fernando Marín, Barbarita's Defense lawyer
- Karl Hoffman as Eleazar Reyes, Ricarda's brother, Antonio Adolfo and Valentino's uncle.
- Luis Alberto García....Porfirio, Drug Dealer, Freddy’s friend.
