= Ana de nadie =

Colombian telenovela

- Genre: Telenovela
- Based on: Señora Isabel by Bernardo Romero Pereiro and Mónica Agudelo
- Developed by: Jimena Romero; Gilma Peña
- Written by: Jimena Romero; María J. Acero; Gilma Peña
- Directed by: Luis Carlos Sierra; Olga Lucía Rodríguez
- Starring: Paola Turbay; Sebastián Carvajal; Jorge Enrique Abello
- Theme music composer: Carlos Vives; Andrés Castro
- Opening theme: "Nuestro Secreto" by Carlos Vives
- Composer: Juan Castiblanco
- Country of origin: Colombia
- Original language: Spanish
- No. of seasons: 1
- No. of episodes: 94

Production
- Executive producer: Yalile Giordanelli
- Editor: Marcela Vásquez P.
- Production company: RCN Televisión

Original release
- Network: Canal RCN
- Release: 1 March – 25 July 2023

Related
- Mirada de mujer; Victoria; Si nos dejan

Ana de nadie (English title: Simply Ana) is a Colombian telenovela produced by RCN Televisión. It aired from 1 March 2023 to 25 July 2023. The series is an adaptation of the 1993 telenovela Señora Isabel, which most recent popular version was Si nos dejan. It stars Paola Turbay, Sebastián Carvajal, and Jorge Enrique Abello.

== Plot ==
Ana Ocampo (Paola Turbay) is a 50-year-old woman who will have to face a divorce, after she discovers that her husband, Horacio (Jorge Enrique Abello), is unfaithful with a much younger woman, Adelaida Gómez (Laura Archbold). In the midst of her loneliness, Ana discovers that the end of her marriage will become a second chance for her as she enjoys her new life and becomes a stronger woman. She ends up meeting Joaquín Cortés (Sebastián Carvajal), who, after meeting Ana, assures her that she is the woman of his life. Meanwhile, Horacio realizes that ending his relationship with Ana was a mistake.

== Cast ==
- Paola Turbay as Ana Ocampo
- Sebastián Carvajal as Joaquín Cortés
- Jorge Enrique Abello as Horacio Valenzuela
- Laura Archbold as Adelaida Gómez
- Judy Henríquez as Dolores Viuda de Ocampo
- Ramistelly Herrera as Emma Valenzuela
- Carlos Báez as Pedro Valenzuela
- Ilenia Antonini as Florencia Valenzuela
- Adriana Romero as Genoveva Serrano
- Adriana Arango as Violeta Dávila
- Lucho Velasco as Benjamín Lemus
- Andrés Toro as Luciano Ucross
- Diana Wiswell as Oriana Castro
- Camila Zárate as Magdalena Zea
- Samuel Montalvo as Teo Cortés
- Carmen Rosa Franco as Úrsula Rojas
- Laura Hernández as Ximena Rojas

=== Recurring and guest stars ===
- Ana María Pérez
- Ariana Diaz
- Mónica Botero
- Felipe Barbetti
- Eddy Lozada
- Carlos Quintero
- Óscar Javier Cuesta
- Felipe Fetecua
- Víctor Hugo Morant
- Eduardo López

== Production ==
Filming of the telenovela began on 9 November 2022. The first teaser of the series was shown on 8 February 2023.

== Episodes ==
No.	Title	Original release date	Colombia viewers (Rating points)
1	"Algo se fractura en el corazón de Ana"	1 March 2023	7.1
2	"Entre la espada y la pared"	2 March 2023	6.7
3	"Un día de momentos sorpresa"	3 March 2023	6.4
4	"Adelaida sufre una gran decepción"	6 March 2023	6.5
5	"El paseo de la familia Valenzuela"	7 March 2023	6.7
6	"Un asunto de familia"	8 March 2023	6.1
7	"Adelaida en medio de los hombres Valenzuela"	9 March 2023	6.6
8	"Ximena descubrió algo importante"	10 March 2023	6.9
9	"Un matrimonio al borde del abismo"	13 March 2023	6.5
10	"Una herida que se destapó"	14 March 2023	7.0
11	"No hay cura para un corazón roto"	15 March 2023	6.5
12	"Reconciliación a la vista"	16 March 2023	7.4
13	"Adelaida sigue acechando la vida de Horacio"	17 March 2023	6.6
14	"Ana se encuentra en duda"	21 March 2023	7.4
15	"Un héroe desdibujado"	22 March 2023	7.8
16	"Se acerca un inesperado encuentro"	23 March 2023	6.6
17	"Como el agua y el aceite"	24 March 2023	6.6
18	"Humillación en público"	27 March 2023	7.8
19	"Existe la cura para el mal de amores"	28 March 2023	7.7
20	"No hay vuelta atrás"	29 March 2023	8.1
21	"Sin medir las consecuencias"	30 March 2023	8.2
22	"No digas mentiras, Horacio"	31 March 2023	7.2
23	"Existen las segundas oportunidades"	3 April 2023	7.4
24	"No se puede recuperar el tiempo perdido"	4 April 2023	6.8
25	"Las oportunidades se sobornan"	5 April 2023	6.2
26	"El efecto Joaquín Cortés"	10 April 2023	7.7
27	"El que es, no deja de ser"	11 April 2023	7.8
28	"Los instintos del corazón"	12 April 2023	8.5
29	"Jaque mate"	13 April 2023	7.8
30	"Joaquín es la nueva moda"	14 April 2023	7.8
31	"Los dramas del amor"	17 April 2023	7.8
32	"Vivir sin dar explicaciones"	18 April 2023	8.2
33	"Las mieles del amor"	19 April 2023	8.0
34	"Los líos de la familia Valenzuela Ocampo"	20 April 2023	8.0
35	"El amor duele"	21 April 2023	7.1
36	"Cuando se acabe la indignación"	24 April 2023	8.2
37	"Asumir nuevos retos"	25 April 2023	7.6
38	"En las buenas, en las malas"	26 April 2023	7.6
39	"Las artimañas de Horacio"	27 April 2023	7.4
40	"Líos de amigas"	28 April 2023	7.8
41	"Los espacios dan un respiro"	2 May 2023	8.4
42	"Es hora de vivir plenamente"	3 May 2023	7.8
43	"Decisiones que cambian la vida"	4 May 2023	8.5
44	"Joaquín está contra la espada y la pared"	5 May 2023	7.1
45	"Los problemas llegan a la puerta de Horacio"	8 May 2023	7.6
46	"En juego largo, hay desquite"	9 May 2023	7.8
47	"Joaquín no logra la tranquilidad"	10 May 2023	8.0
48	"En la guerra y en el amor, todo se vale"	11 May 2023	7.2
49	"Ana supera sus miedos en busca de libertad"	12 May 2023	7.3
50	"Bienvenidas las nuevas oportunidades"	15 May 2023	7.0
51	"El respeto se gana con hechos"	16 May 2023	7.0
52	"Los triunfos merecen celebrarse"	17 May 2023	7.0
53	"Las decisiones de vida son difíciles de tomar"	18 May 2023	7.9
54	"Horacio es destronado por Joaquín"	19 May 2023	7.7
55	"Es mejor pensar con cabeza fría"	23 May 2023	7.5
56	"La mala influencia tiene sus límites"	24 May 2023	7.2
57	"Ayudar fortalece el alma"	25 May 2023	7.8
58	"Es tiempo de ser un padre responsable"	26 May 2023	7.8
59	"Las nuevas batallas de Ana"	29 May 2023	8.1
60	"La verdad llega tarde, pero llega"	30 May 2023	8.1
61	"Ana asume problemas que no son suyos"	31 May 2023	7.0
62	"Las malas noticias son las primeras que llegan"	1 June 2023	7.6
63	"Problemas en el paraíso"	2 June 2023	7.3
64	"La duda empieza a nacer"	5 June 2023	7.5
65	"La mentira tiene muchas caras"	6 June 2023	8.1
66	"Se quiebra el castillo de cristal"	7 June 2023	7.8
67	"La desconfianza duele"	8 June 2023	8.6
68	"Armando las piezas del rompecabezas"	9 June 2023	8.3
69	"Ante la intriga, la cabeza da muchas vueltas"	13 June 2023	8.8
70	"Se cae el cuento de hadas de Adelaida"	14 June 2023	8.8
71	"El corazón no aguanta tanto"	15 June 2023	8.6
72	"Viviendo el duelo de la pérdida"	16 June 2023	9.1
73	"Florencia enfrenta su realidad"	20 June 2023	8.8
74	"Hay marcas que el corazón no borra"	21 June 2023	7.7
75	"Quitando la venda de los ojos"	22 June 2023	8.6
76	"Pensamientos que llegan a confundir"	23 June 2023	8.0
77	"La cobardía no deja lucir la verdad"	26 June 2023	8.8
78	"Es mejor enfrentar la verdad"	27 June 2023	8.2
79	"La soberbia de Horacio"	28 June 2023	8.9
80	"Nunca es tarde para pedir perdón"	29 June 2023	8.7
81	"Ana lidia con los problemas de los demás"	30 June 2023	6.8
82	"Buscando libertad y paz"	4 July 2023	8.7
83	"La mala suerte acompaña a Joaquín"	5 July 2023	9.5
84	"Las mentiras caen por su propio peso"	6 July 2023	9.0
85	"Después de la tormenta, llega la calma"	7 July 2023	8.2
86	"Horacio vive su peor momento"	10 July 2023	9.9
87	"En medio de la soledad, Horacio paga su orgullo"	11 July 2023	9.4
88	"Los cambios siempre son bienvenidos"	12 July 2023	9.8
89	"Horacio aprende a valorar a su familia"	13 July 2023	9.4
90	"Llega el comienzo de una nueva historia"	14 July 2023	8.8
91	"La fragilidad de la vida es evidente"	17 July 2023	9.7
92	"La encrucijada de Joaquín"	18 July 2023	9.5
93	"Los para siempre se buscan"	19 July 2023	9.7
94	"La felicidad no tiene un final"	25 July 2023	9.1

== Reception ==
=== Ratings ===
Season	Timeslot (COT)	Episodes	First aired		Last aired		Avg. viewers (in points)
Season	Timeslot (COT)	Episodes	Date	Viewers (in points)	Date	Viewers (in points)	Avg. viewers (in points)
1	Mon–Fri 9:30 p.m.	94	1 March 2023	7.1	25 July 2023	9.1	7.8

=== Awards and nominations ===
Year	Award	Category	Nominated	Result	Ref
2023	Produ Awards	Best Short Telenovela	Ana de nadie	Won	
2023	Produ Awards	Best Lead Actress - Superseries or Telenovela	Paola Turbay	Nominated	
2023	Produ Awards	Best Supporting Actor - Superseries or Telenovela	Jorge Enrique Abello	Nominated	
