= Anita no te rajes =

- Genre: Telenovela
- Created by: Valentina Párraga
- Written by: Axel Herreman; Paul Rodríguez; Roberto Stopello; Perla Farías
- Directed by: Danny Gavidia; David Posada
- Creative director: Piedad Arango
- Starring: Ivonne Montero; Jorge Enrique Abello; Natalia Streignard; Marcelo Cezán
- Music by: Alberto Slezynger
- Opening theme: "Anita no te rajes" by Bacha
- Country of origin: United States
- Original language: Spanish
- No. of episodes: 139

Production
- Executive producers: Alejandro García Ramón; Aurelio Valcárcel Carroll
- Producers: Martha Godoy; Mary-Kathryn Kennedy
- Cinematography: Joseph Martínez; Rafael Puentes
- Editor: Sebastián Jiménez
- Camera setup: Multi-camera
- Production company: Telemundo Studios

Original release
- Network: Telemundo
- Release: September 14, 2004 – April 4, 2005

Anita, no te rajes (Anita, Don't Give Up!) is a Spanish-language telenovela produced by the American-based television network Telemundo. It stars Jorge Enrique Abello, Ivonne Montero and Natalia Streignard. It was written by Valentina Parraga, directed by David Posada and Gaviria; with Martha Godoy and Mary-Kathryn Kennedy as General Producer and Aurelio Valcárcel Carroll as Executive Producer. This telenovela was aired in at least 10 countries around the world.

Although the novela was set in Los Angeles, Telemundo filmed the serial in Miami, Fl. Through [sometimes not so] careful editing it was made to appear as Los Angeles. The network debuted it on September 14, 2004 to April 4, 2005 at the 7 pm (6 pm central) timeslot. Telemundo added English subtitles as closed captions on CC3.

== Plot ==
¡Anita, no te rajes! is a funny story which tells the adventures of Anita, a positive and happy young Mexican girl who never gave up on everything, following her deceased mother's quote: "Las Guerrero no se rajan" (The Guerreros never give up). Anita decides to come to the US without her documents in order to find her aunt, Consuelo Guerrero, the only surviving member of her family.

Consuelo married an important contractor of Irish origins and she is heiress to a huge fortune.

== Cast ==
- Jorge Enrique Abello as Eduardo Jose Contreras - main hero, in love with Anita, spouse of Ariana, son of Emiliano
- Ivonne Montero as Ana 'Anita' Guerrero - main heroine, daughter of Graciela, in love with Eduardo
- Natalia Streignard as Ariana Elena "Dupont" Perez Aristizábal - main female villain, wife of Eduardo, hates Anita
- Marcelo Cezán as David Aristizábal - cousin of Anita, in love with Anita and then with Lucecita
- Elluz Peraza as Consuelo Guerrero / Graciela O'Donnell - mother of Anita and Billy, stepmother of Maggie
- Eduardo Serrano as Emiliano Contreras - father of Eduardo, in love with Graciela
- Isabel Moreno as Cachita Moret - grandmother of Lucecita, ex-friend of Amanda
- Jeannette Lehr as Carlota Aristizábal de Dupont - mother of Ariana, villain, then she goes crazy
- Martha Picanes as Amanda Aristizábal - grandmother of Anita and David, aunt of Ariana, villain, then hero
- Roberto Moll as Abelardo Reyes - father of David, in love with Dulce
- Laura Termini as Maggie O`Donnell - daughter of Tom, hates Anita, half sister of Billy
- Christian Tapán as Padre Francisco - friend of Eduardo
- Giovan Ramos as Ramiro Albornoz - villain, father of the child of Ariana, killed by Ariana
- Alexa Kuve as Dulce Maria Contreras - sister of Eduardo, in love with Abelardo
- Millie Ruperto as Ambar Barros - mother of Angie, in love with Memo
- Andrea Loreto as Angie Barros - daughter of Ambar
- Ruben Camelo as Roque Izquierdo - father of Guadalupe and husband of Nati Izquierdo
- Jana Martinez as Nati Izquierdo - mother of Guadalupe and wife of Roque Izquierdo
- Kenia Gazcon as Guadalupe Izquierdo - daughter of Nati and Roque, in love with Chucho
- Yadira Santana as Mercedes - maid of family Contreras
- Michelle Manterola as Lucecita - best friend of Anita, granddaughter of Cachita, in love with David
- Yaxkin Santalucia as El Chucho - in love with Guadalupe
- Sabas Malaver as Memo Valiente - in love with Ambar
- Jorge Alberti as El Fresa
- Gabriel Parisi as Billy O`Donnell - son of Tom and Graciela
- Daniel Fabius as Tom O`Donnell - spouse of Graciela, dies in a car accident
- Martha Mijares as Zilfides Delgado The Judge
- Enrique Rodriguez as Camilo
- Steve Roth as Plutarco Madrid, main male villain, Arianna's lover and accomplice
