= Ivonne Montero =

Mexican actress and model

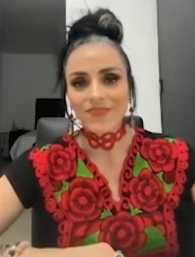
- Montero in 2024
- Born: Ivonne García Macedo Montero; April 25, 1974 (age 52); Mexico City, Distrito Federal, Mexico
- Occupations: Actress; model; singer
- Years active: 1997–present
- Spouse: Fabio Melanitto (m. 2011; div. 2013)
- Children: 1

Ivonne Montero (born Ivonne García Macedo Montero on April 25, 1974) is a Mexican actress, model and singer. She is best known for playing the leading role in ¡Anita, no te rajes! ("Anita, Don't Give Up!") in 2004.

== Biography ==
She has portrayed a wide variety of roles in telenovelas, and has appeared in several serials, including Rosalinda, Las vías del amor, Decisiones and El Juego de la Vida. She played the struggling single mother Maité Contreras in Telemundo's Sin Vergüenza. In 2008, she appeared in the Sci-Fi Original, The Wild Reporter. In October 2008 she returned to Mexico to star in the soap opera called Secretos del Alma on TV Azteca.

In April 2009, she participated in the reality show El Gran Desafio, also on TV Azteca. In 2010 Ivonne starred in the telenovela La Loba alongside Mauricio Islas. She was married to Fabio Melanitto from 2011 to 2013. On May 2, 2013, she gave birth to a daughter, Antonella.

== Filmography ==
Film roles
Year	Title	Role	Notes
2002	El tigre de Santa Julia	Rosa	
2002	Asesino en serio	Yolanda	
2006	Los Pajarracos	Sulama	
2007	Ladrón que Roba a Ladrón	Rafaela	
2007	The Wild Reporter (La reportera salvaje)	Miranda	
2008	Al fin y al cabo	Karla	
2008	Playball	Sofía	
2009	Dating License	Elisabeth	

Television roles
Year	Title	Role	Notes
1997	Alguna vez tendremos alas	Alicia	Guest star
1997-98	Salud, dinero y amor	Ivonne Sanchéz	Supporting role
1999	Nunca Te Olvidaré	Paola Campos	Supporting role
1999	Rosalinda	Celina Barriga #2	Guest star
1999	Alma Rebelde		Supporting role
1999-00	Mujeres engañadas		Supporting role
1999-00	DKDA: Sueños de Juventud	Herself	Guest star
2000	Siempre te amaré	Mercedes "Meche" Gonzáles	Supporting role
2000	La casa en la playa	Katia	Supporting role
2000-01	Por un beso		Supporting role
2000-01	El juego de la vida	Carola Lizardi #1	Supporting role
2001	Diseñador ambos sexos	Bárbara (barwoman)	Episode: "Examen de conciencia Libro III"
2002-03	Las Vías del Amor	Damiana "Madonna"	Supporting role
2003	La familia P. Luche		Episode: "Viaje a Cancún"
2003-04	Amor Descarado	Betsabe Galdames	Main role
2004-05	Anita no te rajes	Ana "Anita" Aristizabal Guerrero	Main role
2008-09	Secretos del alma	Diana Cervantes	Main role
2009	Valeria	María Inmaculada Hidalgo/Coral	Supporting role
2009	Gran Desafío	Herself	Reality show
2010	La Loba	Ángeles Fernández Luna/Ángeles Alcázar Segovia "La Loba"	Main role
2011	Generación	Herself	Host
2012; 2016	La Isla, el reality	Herself	Reality show (seasons 1 and 5)
2013	México baila	Herself	Reality show
2013-14	Hombre tenías que ser	Raquel Lomelí Montemayor	Main role
2016	El Señor de los Cielos	Consuelo "Connie" Limón	Series regular
2017–2018	Las Malcriadas	Rosa Ochoa	Main role
2021	Malverde: El Santo Patrón	Ángeles Serrano	Main role
2022	La casa de los famosos	Herself	Reality show (season 2 winner)
2022	Amores que engañan	Angie	Episode: "Lo virtual no es real"
2023	¿Quién es la máscara?	Pastelito	Reality show (season 5)
2025	Unspeakable Sins	Detective Sofía Curiel	Recurring
2026	La Granja VIP	Herself	Reality show (season 2)

== Awards ==
Year	Awards	Category	Nominee	Result
2003	Premios Diosas de Plata	Revelation Female	El tigre de Santa Julia	Won
2009	Premios Bravo	Best Actress	Secretos del alma	Won
