= Brenda Bezares =

Mexican actress and model

- Born: Brenda Yamile Jiménez Loya; April 26, 1968 (age 58); Monterrey, Nuevo León, Mexico
- Occupations: Model, actress, singer, TV hostess
- Years active: 1981–present
- Spouse: Mario Bezarez (1991-present)
- Musical career
- Genres: Latin; Contemporary

Brenda Bezares (born Brenda Yamile Jiménez Loya; April 26, 1968) is a Mexican actress, singer, TV hostess and former model. She is best known for Vamos a ayudarnos, Liliana and Mi vida eres tú.

== Early life and career ==
Bezares was born in Monterrey, Nuevo León, Mexico. She graduated from the Faculty of Performing Arts in Monterrey, and studied classical dance for two years at the Superior School of Music and Dance of Monterrey. She studied acting with Xavier Marc and director Sergio Jiménez.

Bezares began her modeling career at age 13, participating in fashion shows for prestigious designers and advertising campaigns. Two years later, she started participating in contemporary and jazz dance workshops, as well as in university-level musical comedies such as Vaseline, Cabaret, Así es el show and Un cuento de Navidad.

In 1990, Bazares represented Mexico at the Miss Intercontinental pageant, held in Lagos, Nigeria where she secured the second runner-up and won the Miss Photogenic Award, that opened doors for her to later work on several telenovelas in the United States and Venezuela. She also worked on several shows on regiomontana television.

On June 21, 2012, Bezares presented her first album as a solo singer, which was titled Sueños Cumplidos. The production includes nine tracks in the Latin and contemporary style. This led to the release of her first singles, Demasiado Fuerte (cover version of a Yolandita Monge song) and Yo ya me voy.

== Personal life ==
Bezares married TV Host Mario Bezares in 1991. The marriage produced two children, Alejandro and Alan. Her husband was accused of being involved in the murder of Paco Stanley, and was subsequently imprisoned. Family difficulties continued after his release, until Bezares was invited by a friend to attend a Christian congregation, which led to the couple's conversion to Christianity. In 2013, Bazares suffered a pulmonary embolism from which she recovered, and published an autobiography entitled Demasiado Fuerte, la Novela.

== Filmography ==
Television, Telenovelas, Films
Year	Title	Role	Notes
2002	El show del pueblo	Herself/hostess	TV show
2003/04	Con sello de mujer	Herself/hostess	TV show
2005/06	Olvidarte jamás	Constanza Montero de Terán	Supporting role
2006	La reportera salvaje	Raquel Tovar	TV movie
2007	Liliana	Sofia	Short film
2007/10	Vivalavi	Herself/hostess	TV show
2008	Mi vida eres tú	Marisela Reyes	Supporting role
2008	Vamos a ayudarnos	Aunt Sonia	Short film
2010/11	Dímelo	Herself/hostess	TV show
2011/12	Dimelo cada mañana	Herself/hostess	TV show
2012/13	La mañana es nuestra	Herself/hostess	TV show

== Theatre ==
- Cada oveja con su pareja
- Las consuegras
- Diablos, cuanto Ángel
- Chilaquiles con champagne
- Mi adorada Mimí
- El criado malcriado
- La monja y la golfa
- Sex and the crisis
- Pastores a la diabla 2
- Las Mil y Dos Noches
