= Yamile Haraoui Ghebalou =

Algerian academic and writer

Yamilé Ghebalou-Haraoui
- Born: 1956 (age 69–70); Cherchell, Algeria
- Education: University of Algiers, Lumière University Lyon 2
- Occupations: Academic, writer
- Writing career
- Language: French
- Genres: Poetry, short stories, novels
- Notable works: Kawn, Demeures du Bleu, Grenade, Liban, L'enfance est ma demeure

Yamilé Ghebalou-Haraoui (sometimes spelled Yamile Ghebalou-Haraoui), born in 1956 in Cherchell (Algeria), is an academic and writer from Algeria. She teaches French literature and Maghrebi Francophone literature at the University of Algiers and publishes poetry collections, short stories, and novels.

== Biography ==
Yamilé Ghebalou-Haraoui was born in 1956 in Cherchell. She is a maître de conférences (senior lecturer) in the French Department at the University of Algiers.

She defended her doctoral thesis in literature at Lumière University Lyon 2 in 2005, focused on writing and cryptography in Maghrebi Francophone literature.

== Literary work ==
Yamilé Ghebalou-Haraoui has published collections of poetry, short stories, and novels. She frequently attends book fairs and literary events.

=== Bibliography ===
- Kawn — poetry collection.
- Demeures du Bleu — poetry collection. ISBN 9947838285
- Grenade — short story collection, Chihab Editions. ISBN 9961637119
- Liban — novel, Chihab Editions. ISBN 9961638204
- L'enfance est ma demeure — Frantz Fanon Editions, 2016. ISBN 9931572167
- Paroles interieures — poetry ISBN 9947210081
- L'anniversaire — short story ISBN 9961638239

== Public activities ==
She has participated in literary events (literary cafés, book fairs) and has given public lectures in Algeria.

== Reception and studies ==
Her works are listed in library catalogues (Sudoc, Algerian OPACs) and sold by French-speaking booksellers such as Decitre and Furet du Nord.
