= Mary-Kathryn Kennedy =

American TV producer and media executive

Mary-Kathryn "M-K" Kennedy is an American TV producer and media executive who started her career working on Spanish-language telenovelas produced by the United States–based television network Telemundo. She has been executive producer of Marina, El Juramento and associate producer of ¡Anita, no te rajes!.

In 2024 she was appointed Executive Managing Director of TV Series at STUDIOCANAL, having previously been Netflix's VP Production, Europe.

== Partial filmography ==
=== Executive producer – StudioCanal ===
- Apollo Has Fallen (TBA)
- Army of Shadows (TBA)

=== Executive producer – Telemundo ===
- El Juramento (2008)
- Sin Senos No Hay Paraíso (2008)
- Marina (2006/07)

=== Associate producer ===
- ¡Anita, No Te Rajes! (1998)
