= Bernardo Romero Pereiro =

Colombian actor, director, and writer

Bernardo Romero Pereiro (1944–2005) was a Colombian actor, director, and writer. He was known for his 40 year career on television and his work on numerous Colombian telenovelas, notably Señora Isabel (or Mirade de Mujer) and Escalona. He was also the founder of Producciones Bernardo Romero Pereiro.

== Early life and education ==
Romero was born in 1944, the son of the television director Bernardo Romero Lozano and the actress Anuncia Pereiro (also known as Carmen de Lugo).

== Career ==
He was appointed director of the Teatro Colón by the President of Colombia in 1938. He was the head of the television theatre at the National Television Network. He also worked for Mexico’s TV Azteca and Telemundo in the United States. He directed The Swamp Boy, the first play performed on tv in Colombia.

Romero's television career spanned 4 decades. He was known for his 40 year career on television and his work on numerous Colombian telenovelas, notably Señora Isabel. He is known for his work on the TV series, Dejemonos de vainas, Escalona and Ana de Nadie.

He is also credited with discovering Fernando Gaitán, who's telenovela "Yo Soy Betty, la Fea" (Ugly Betty) would become the most successful.

== Personal life ==
Pereiro was married to actress, Judy Henríquez. He died on 4 August 2005 due to a respiratory failure. He was 61.

== Awards and honours ==
Over the course of his career, Pereiro won numerous awards, including

- Víctor Nieto Lifetime Achievement Award
- Best Director Award at the India Catalina Awards
- Director of the century at the TVyNovelas Awards.
