= Antonio Delli =

Venezuelan actor

- Born: Antonio Delli Rocioli Ferreira; Caracas, Venezuela
- Education: Universidad Central de Venezuela
- Occupation: Actor

Antonio Delli Rocioli Ferreira better known as Antonio Delli is a Venezuelan actor of television, theater, films, announcer and dubbing. Born in Caracas, Venezuela. Delli ventured into television in 2006 in the Venezuelan telenovela Ciudad Bendita.

== Biography ==
Delli began doing theater while studying administration in the Universidad Católica Andrés Bello. However, he decided to leave the university and began to form as an actor in the National Theater Workshop at the Rajatabla Foundation. Later, he graduated with a degree in Social Communication at the Universidad Central de Venezuela.

== Filmography ==
Television performances
Year	Title	Role	Notes
2006	Ciudad Bendita	Gonzalo Venturini	
2008	¿Vieja yo?	Wincho Estaba	
2009	Un esposo para Estela	José Carlos Guerrero	
2011	La viuda joven	Julio Castillo	
2012	Mi ex me tiene ganas	Detective Jose Ernesto Navas	
2013–2014	De todas maneras Rosa	Luis Enrique Macho Vergara	
2014–2015	Escándalos	Unknown	2 episodes
2015–2016	Amor secreto	Carlos Ernesto Ferrándiz Aristizábal	
2016	Entre tu amor y mi amor	Eloy Monserrat	
2017	Prueba de fe	Rodolfo	Episode: "San Dimas"
