= ¿Vieja yo? =

Television series

- Genre: Telenovela; Romance; Comedy
- Created by: Mónica Montañez
- Written by: Mónica Montañez; Elio Palencia; Adriana Franco; Gerardo Blanco
- Directed by: Carlos Izquierdo
- Starring: Mimi Lazo; Adrián Delgado; Marjorie De Sousa; Jean Carlo Simancas
- Opening theme: La Vieja Esa by Chino & Nacho
- Country of origin: Venezuela
- Original language: Spanish
- No. of episodes: 122

Production
- Executive producer: Sandra Rioboo
- Producer: Alejandro León
- Production locations: Caracas; Venevisión Studios
- Cinematography: Carolina de Jacovo
- Editors: Omar Sabino; José Leonardo Suarez
- Running time: 45 minutes
- Production company: Venevisión

Original release
- Network: Venevisión
- Release: September 11, 2008 – March 7, 2009

Related
- Torrente; La vida entera

¿Vieja yo? (English title: Never too late, Lit: Old me?) is a Venezuelan telenovela written by Mónica Montañez and produced by Venevisión in 2008.

On 11 September 2008, Venevisión started broadcasting ¿Vieja yo? weekdays at 9:00 pm, replacing Torrente. The last episode was broadcast on 7 March 2009. The theme for the telenovela La Vieja Esa was sung by Chino & Nacho.

Mimi Lazo and Adrián Delgado starred as protagonists, while Marjorie De Sousa and Jean Carlo Simancas starred as antagonists.

== Plot ==
Margot Ramírez is a fifty-year-old woman who yearns for more from life after being stuck in a boring marriage to Justo, a man who ignores her and who is cheating on her with a younger woman. Although she is physically attractive, she is past her prime, but she is still determined to fulfill her dreams of becoming an actress, seeing her family happy and finding a man who will fulfill her.

One day, Margot applies for a casting call for actors to appear in a commercial for a popular department store where her husband also works. This is a lifetime opportunity for Margot, and she is asked to put her acting skills to the test by posing as the store's new general manager, a scheme created by the store's owner. While working here, she falls in love with José Antonio, the stores owner's grandson, thus making her feel young again. However, their relationship will face rough challenges such as José Antonio girlfriend, Estefania, who cannot understand why he is in love with a woman old enough to be his mother while ignoring her youthful beauty.

== Cast ==
- Mimi Lazo as Margot Batalla de Ramírez
- Adrian Delgado as José Antonio Martínez García
- Marjorie De Sousa as Estefanía Urrutia Blanco
- Jean Carlo Simancas as Justo Ramírez
- Carlota Sosa as Josefina García Bellini Vda. de Martínez
- Carolina Perpetuo as Rosalía Torres de Estaba
- Rafael Romero as Ildemaro Blanco
- Sonia Villamizar as Martha Fuentes
- Rolando Padilla as Fran Meléndez
- Elaiza Gil as Ixora Fuentes
- Antonio Delli as Wincho Estaba
- María Antonieta Duque as Tamara Luján de Meléndez
- Juan Manuel Montesinos as Joaquín Urrutia
- Laureano Olivares as Alberto Sánchez "El Topo"
- Eva Blanco as Clemencia Batalla
- Chelo Rodríguez as Marisol Pérez de Martínez
- Raúl Amundaray as José I Martínez "Don Pipo"
- Alejo Felipe as Ariel Gil
- Caridad Canelon as Aracelis Sánchez
- Mirtha Pérez as La madre de Tamara
- Freddy Galavis as Nemecio Bello
- José Manuel Suárez as Justo "Justito" Ramírez Batalla
- Sindy Lazo as Milagros Urrutia Blanco
- Pastor Oviedo as Diego Sánchez
- Mario Sudano as Yony Frías
- Erika Schwarzgruber as Daniela Estaba Torres
- Erika Santiago as Esperanza Martínez
- Virginia Lancaster as Nancy Peña
- Marjorie Magri as Elizabeth Ramírez Batalla
- Deive Garcés as José Enrique Flores "Cheito"
- Héctor Zambrano as Héctor Bambino
- Regino Giménez as Friita
- Genesis Oldenbug as Mikaela Meléndez Luján
- Daniel Sarcos as Camionero de la colchonería
- Luis "Moncho" Martínez as Camionero de la colchonería
- Edgardo Márquez as Camionero de la colchonería
- Manuel Salazar as Juan Crisóstomo
- Reinaldo José Pérez as Hércules Buendía
- Lisbeth Manrique as Helena
- José Luis Useche as Patrocinio Bracho
- Alejandra Machado as Justicia "Ticia" Ramírez
