= Marisa Román =

Venezuelan actress (born 1982)

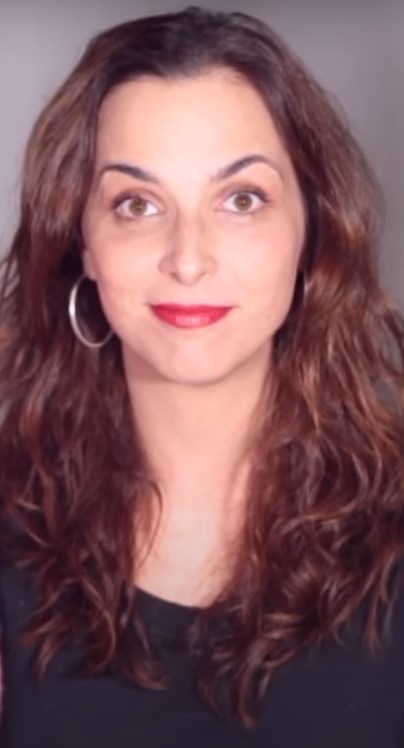
- Román in 2018
- Born: January 30, 1982 (age 44); Caracas, Venezuela
- Occupation: Actress

María Isabel Román Bianchetti (born January 30, 1982) is a Venezuelan actress known for her role in various Venevisión telenovelas written by renowned screenwriter Leonardo Padrón and various theater and film productions.

== Biography ==
Marisa began acting at the age of 9 by acting in children's theater. Her first acting role was in the telenovela Así es la vida in 1998 produced by Laura Visconti Productions for Venevisión. Her major breakthrough role came in 2004 where she played the dual role of twins Verónica and Maria Suspiro in the hit telenovela Cosita Rica written by Leonardo Padrón.

In 2006, she obtained her first protagonist role in the telenovela Ciudad Bendita written by Leonardo Padrón. She would later participate in Leonardo's later telenovelas La vida entera in 2009 and La mujer perfecta in 2010.

After her participation in La mujer perfecta, Marisa moved to Los Angeles in the United States to participate in various film productions and study acting in order to improve on her acting talent.

In 2013, Marisa returned to Venezuela to star as the protagonist of Venevisión's telenovela De todas maneras Rosa.

Apart from her work in telenovelas, Marisa has also participated in various films such as Memorias de un Soldado, The Zero Hour, El Manzano Azul, Elipsis, among others.

== Filmography ==
=== Telenovelas ===
| Year | Title | Role |
|---|---|---|
| 1998 | Así es la vida | Marisol |
| 1999 | La calle de los sueños | Amanda |
| 2000 | Muñeca de trapo | Soledad |
| 2001 | Viva la Pepa | Mariana López |
| 2001 | A Calzón Quitao | Juliana |
| 2002 | Trapos íntimos | María Soledad "Marisol" Lobo Santacruz |
| 2003 | Cosita Rica | Verónica Luján/Maria Suspiro Vargas |
| 2005 | El amor las vuelve locas | Vanessa Conde |
| 2006 | Ciudad Bendita | Bendita Sánchez |
| 2009 | La vida entera | Carlota Duque |
| 2010 | La mujer perfecta | Lucia Reverón |
| 2013 | De todas maneras Rosa | Rosa María Bermudez |

=== Films ===
- Dia Naranja ( 2009)
- The Zero Hour (2010) as Veronica Rojas
- Samuel (2011) as Engracia
- Memorias de un Soldado (2012) as Lucia
- El Manzano Azul (2012) as Isabel Adulta
- Cuidado con lo que sueñas (2013)
- Translucido ( 2016)
- Litlle Square ( TBA)
- All my Tomorrow ( TBA)
