= Intriga tras cámaras =

Venezuelan telenovela

- Genre: Telenovela
- Created by: Henry Galué
- Written by: Carmelo Castro
- Starring: Alexandra Braun; Adrián Delgado; Carlos Guillermo Haydon
- Country of origin: Venezuela
- Original language: Spanish

Production
- Production location: Caracas, Venezuela
- Camera setup: Multi-camera

Intriga tras cámaras is an upcoming Venezuelan telenovela written by Carmelo Castro, from a screenplay by Henry Galué. The series is produced by Quimera Producciones. The filming of the production began in January 2019, was mostly filmed in Caracas, Venezuela, and consists of 60 episodes of one hour. It stars Alexandra Braun, Adrián Delgado, and Carlos Guillermo Haydon.

On 4 May 2020, ABC.com confirmed that production of the telenovela temporarily suspended due to the COVID-19 pandemic in Venezuela.

As of May 2026, Intriga tras cámaras does not have a release date.

== Cast ==
- Alexandra Braun
- Adrián Delgado
- Carlos Guillermo Haydon
- Antonio Delli
- Zandú Montoya as Diego
- Fernanda Zabian as Daniela
- Ana Karina Casanova
- Rafael Oropeza as Jimmy Bustamante
- Martin Almonetti as Ramses
- Simón Pestana
- Gonzalo Velutini
- Carlos Felipe Alvarez
- Antonio Cuevas
- Henry Soto
- Luiseth Materán
- Asdrúbal Blanco
- Gerardo Luongo
- Eudis Ruiz
- Manuel Salazar
- Cesar Bencid
- Jesus Cervo
- William Cuao
- Kenia Carpio
