= My Sweet Fat Valentina =

- Mi gorda bella
- Genre: Telenovela
- Created by: Rossana Negrín
- Written by: Carmelo Castro; José Manuel Espiño; Carmen García Vilar; Indira Páez
- Story by: Carolina Espada
- Directed by: José Alcalde; Luis Padilla
- Creative director: Tania Pérez
- Starring: Natalia Streignard; Juan Pablo Raba; Hilda Abrahamz; Flavio Caballero; Emma Rabbe
- Opening theme: "Poco a poco" by Jeremías
- Country of origin: Venezuela
- Original language: Spanish
- No. of episodes: 178

Production
- Executive producer: Leonor Sardi
- Producers: Ana Vizoso González; Joy Guilarte; Yenni Morales
- Cinematography: Domingo Fuentes; Rafael Núñez
- Editors: Rolando Chávez; Alexis Montero
- Camera setup: Multi-camera

Original release
- Network: RCTV
- Release: November 20, 2002 – September 26, 2003

Related
- Llena de amor

Mi gorda bella (English title: My Sweet Fat Valentina, literally 'My beautiful fat woman' or 'My sweet fat woman') is a Venezuelan telenovela created by Carolina Espada and produced by Radio Caracas Televisión in 2002. This telenovela lasted 178 episodes and was distributed internationally by RCTV International.

Natalia Streignard and Juan Pablo Raba star as the protagonists with Hilda Abrahamz as the main antagonist. The series is the reunion of Raba, Streignard, and Abrahamz, along with Flavio Caballero and Amalia Pérez Díaz after they were cast in La niña de mis ojos in 2001.

== Plot ==
My fat beauty tells the story of Valentina Villanueva Lanz (Natalia Streignard), a sweet and pleasant young woman but with serious problems of overweight who will face great obstacles to achieve her happiness. Its history dates back approximately twenty-five years ago; her family was then one of the most important and distinguished families in Caracas and was made up of her parents, Luis Felipe Villanueva (Manuel Salazar), and his wife, the famous singer Eva Lanz de Villanueva (Mimí Lazo); her paternal uncle, Juan Ángel Villanueva (Flavio Caballero), and her great-uncle, Don Segundo Villanueva (Carlos Márquez).

Juan Ángel, who was already engaged to Camelia "La Muñeca" Rivero (Belén Marrero) —member of a wealthy and distinguished family—, met a beautiful young woman on the beach who introduced herself as Olimpia Mercouri (Hilda Abrahamz) and explained that she had just survived a horrible shipwreck where her parents, two Greek citizens, had died. Juan Ángel was dazzled by the beauty of Olimpia and soon after he married her after breaking his engagement to Muñeca and took her to live in the family mansion.

It was there that the problems began for the Villanueva family; Olimpia and Luis Felipe detested themselves because he suspected that she was not the person she claimed to be. Months later, the two women were mothers: Olimpia had a son, Orestes (Juan Pablo Raba), who is not the son of Juan Ángel but Captain José Manuel Sevilla (Daniel Alvarado), the only true love of Olimpia, and Eva, a daughter, Valentina. Also, in the following years, Olimpia had three more children with her husband: Pandora Emilia (Marianela González), Aquiles (Carlos Felipe Álvarez), and Ariadna Margarita (Aileen Celeste).

After investigating for quite some time, Luis Felipe obtained evidence that Olimpia was an impostor. Her real name was María Joaquina Crespo and she was not a young millionaire of Greek origin, but a port prostitute. However, a small part of her story was true: she had survived the wreck of a yacht in which she worked as a waitress for a marriage of Greek millionaires, Aristotle Mercouri and Olimpia Vasilopoulos, causing her thanatophobia (panic to the ocean) and arsonphobia (fire panic). María Joaquina simply invented that she was the daughter of this marriage and calls herself as her supposed mother.

Unable to bear the thought of losing her new position, Olimpia confronted Luis Felipe when he threatened to unmask her and murdered him by throwing him from the balcony of the mansion before making the evidence disappear. Everyone thought that Luis Felipe's death was a suicide, which sank Eva and Valentina morally and psychologically: the first began to drown her sorrows in alcohol, prompted by Olympia, and the second to compulsively eat and gain more and more weight.

With Luis Felipe dead and Eva turned into a heavy alcoholic, Olimpia stands as the matriarch of the family, since Juan Ángel spends most of his time working or traveling on business. With the excuse of protecting Valentina from her mother, the girl is sent to a boarding school in the interior of Venezuela.

Eighteen years pass, and Valentina's graduation day arrives. Eva, who has managed to fully recover from alcoholism, goes to look for her daughter in her private helicopter. After the party, Eva has to continue with her work as a singer, but when she leaves, the device explodes in the air due to provoked sabotage. by Roque at the request of Olimpia. Heartbroken, Valentina decides to go live with her maternal aunt, Tza-Tza Lanz (Emma Rabbe), but her uncle takes her to live with her at home.

Valentina's life changes when she meets her cousin Orestes, with whom she has been in love since she was a child. Orestes, who will become her protective angel, will be loving and kind to Valentina, but she will also meet new enemies, such as Chiquinquirá "Chiqui" Lorenz Rivero (Norkys Batista), Orestes' whimsical fiancée, or her first cousin, Ariadna. However, Valentina's great enemy will be Olimpia.

Over time, Chiqui's relationship with Orestes breaks down and he begins dating Valentina. The day the couple gets engaged, their ex organizes a surprise party for Orestes, who ends up totally drunk, but in reality, the party was a farce to make Valentina believe that Orestes and Chiqui had gone to bed, which did not happen but Valentina believed it and with a broken heart, she decides to go live in Madrid with Aunt Celeste (Amalia Pérez Díaz).

Upon arriving in Spain, Valentina begins with discomfort, so they turn to the doctor, who after some analysis concludes that she was being poisoned. The poison came from the chocolates that Orestes gave her but it was not she who injected it, but Roque at the request of Olympia, but Valentina believed that it was him, which increases her hatred towards Orestes.

Due to a large amount of poison in her body, Valentina is forced to undergo treatments, exercise, and a strict diet with which, over a year, she loses several kilos. With great resentment towards Orestes and his mother, Valentina is refusing to return to Venezuela and decides to stay in Spain and develop her life working there.

During a work trip for Valentina, the employee who cared for Celeste, who was in very poor health, communicates with her family in Venezuela, with Olimpia who attends and travels immediately to Madrid alone. The employee, without knowing Olimpia, trusts her and leaves her alone with Aunt Celeste, whom she forces to sign some papers during her agony, transferring all of Valentina's money to her.

Filled with hatred, Valentina decides to radically change her appearance, take on another character and return to Venezuela with a new identity, that of Bella de la Rosa Montiel, to take revenge on Olimpia and Orestes and fight for her due. For his part, Orestes, heartbroken, decides to dedicate himself to doing good by stealing from the rich and corrupt to give to the poor, under the mask of a hero called "The Silver Lily", taken from the stories of Captain Seville that Roque told Orestes when he was a boy.

Over time, Bella de la Rosa falls in love with El Lirio de Plata, not knowing that it is Orestes, who in turn feels guilty because he loves Bella and Valentina, without knowing that they are the same person. Over time, the true identity of Valentina is discovered who will fight to recover her fortune stolen by Olimpia, who in turn is unmasked by Juan Ángel who contacted the investigator who had hired his deceased brother to investigate it.

Olimpia, already again as María Joaquina Crespo, is imprisoned and lives an ordeal, her faithful servant Roque on a visit to the prison tells her about his plan to free her and ends up stabbing her to get her out of there. Olimpia resigns herself to death, regrets all the evil she did to her family, but Roque ends up forcing her to flee in a ship, still wounded, to save her from prison.

Already on the ship and running away, Roque and Olimpia have an altercation because he is hopelessly in love with her but Olimpia sees him only as a servant. After her refusal, Roque tries to abuse Olimpia, who defends herself with a weapon, both struggle with the pistol, which causes a shot to escape and hit containers full of gasoline for the ship, which ends up causing an explosion, killing both of them.

Without Olimpia in between, Orestes and Valentina were happy with two children and Valentina recovered all the kilos she had lost.

== Characters ==
Valentina and Orestes - They are cousins who fall in love when Valentina comes to live in Orestes' house once she graduates from high school. The house that they live in is rightfully Valentina's. Her mother and father owned it - but they were both secretly killed by Olimpia. They are the main characters of the show - Valentina is an overweight girl and Orestes is the perfect man.

Olimpia Mercouri de Villanueva - mother of Orestes. She's a bad woman who has fooled her husband and children to think she's a good mother and wife. She hates Valentina - and placed into doubt Orestes' real father. (Valentina and Orestes end up not being related at all)

Juan Angel Villanueva - he's Olimpia's husband, father to Orestes, Pandora, Ariadna and Aquiles. He's brother to Valentina's dead father Luis Felipe (Luis Felipe was killed by Olimpia, his sister in-law). So he's Valentina's uncle. He loves his niece and his children but he's been such a busy man that he's failed to see Olimpia's true face. Recently he's realized that Tza Tza "SaSa" has been in love with him all of her life.

Tza Tza "Sasa" Lanz - she's Valentina's aunt, her sister Eva Lanz was killed by Olimpia. Her only family is Valentina. She owns "la pension," a large modest home that has over 5 rooms. She rents them outand also takes in people who can't pay and finds herself in financial debt.

Franklin Carreño - he's an honest cop who fell in love with Valentina from the moment he first met her. He sees her inner goodness and he gets very upset when people try to take advantage of her sweetness. He's suspected for a while that Orestes might feel more for Valentina than mere friendship. He agrees to date Valentina at her request so people would stop teasing her about being in love with Orestes. While in their fake relationship, he really falls in love with her and breaks it off when he knows he's being used. Still, he defends Valentina. One drunk night ends him in bed with Chiqui - that will begin their relationship. He's also investigating Eva's death (Valentina's mother).

Chiquinquirá "Chiqui" Lorenz Rivero de Villanueva Villain - she's Orestes girlfriend and best friend to Ariadna. She's beautiful, rich, arrogant and completely in love with Orestes. Upset at Valentina for taking Orestes away she gets seriously drunk and ends up bed with Franklin. This starts her metamorphosis and her romance with Franklin. Her parents are Lorenzo Lorenz and Carmela "Muñeca" Lorenz - recently she found out that her mother who is good and honest is not really her mother and she's a product of an affair her father had and "Muñeca” adopted her as her own daughter.

Pandora Villanueva Mercouri - she's the third child of Olimpia & Juan Angel. She's very close to Aquiles, her brother. Pandora saw at the age of 6 her mother kill her uncle Luis Felipe and that has traumatized her. She has 'episodes' of lunacy where she starts screaming and struggling. For this reason she's considered the weird one in the family. She thinks she's doomed to suffer in life and never find happiness because she let her uncle get killed. This all changes when she meets and falls in love with the honest cop Jordi - much to her mother's distaste.

Jordi Rosales - he is Franklin's partner and best friend. He's honest and has no problem telling it like it is. He first sees Pandora when he came to her house with Franklin searching for Valentina. Quickly, he falls in love with her and comes on to her - she thinks he's tasteless and common and quickly gives him the cold shoulder. With all of the problems her brother gets into in the beginning of the novela she often turns to him until he kisses her one day. She denies their love for a while but he convinces her to let him into her heart.

Aquiles Villanueva Mercouri - he's the youngest of the Villanuevas. In the beginning of the novela he's very much a loner and very close with his older sister Pandora. Because he's never had a girlfriend everyone think he's gay; he's even confused himself. When he gets into a fight in school he's expelled, consequentially he's thrown out from his house. Homeless and wandering his only hope lies in his sister who worries sick for him and in Valentina- the cousin he loves a lot. Tza Tza offers him a home with her and Valentina in "La Pension" - there he confesses to Valentina that when he was 11 his mother took him to a prostitute and that's traumatized him with women. He runs away in shame from Valentina and he's found days later unconscious. When he wakes up he has no memory of the last year and under his mother's instigations he's led to believe that Valentina is a bad person and he also believes Fabiola to be his girlfriend but it all changes when he starts seeing Ninfa - their maid in a whole new light.

Beatriz Teresa Carreño “Bea” - she's Franklin's younger sister. She's brave, honest and with Ninfa Valentina's best friend. She's a very humble girl and she adores her 'madrina' Tza Tza. Often she defends Valentina to the people that tease her; then, first, she was in love with Jordi, but later falls in love with Orestes' best friend Alejandro who never notices she's alive until she becomes a make-up artist for the company and she becomes the only person he can trust.

== Cast ==
- Natalia Streignard as Valentina Villanueva Lanz de Sevilla / Bella de la Rosa Montiel - Main Heroine
- Juan Pablo Raba as Orestes Villanueva Mercouri / Orestes Sevilla Crespo / Lirio de Plata Jr. - Main Hero
- Hilda Abrahamz as Olimpia Mercouri de Villanueva / María Joaquina Crespo de Sevilla - Main Villain
- Emma Rabbe as Tza Tza Josefina Lanz Alvarado de Sevilla (Sasá)
- Norkys Batista as Chiquinquira "La Chiqui" Lorenz Rivero de Carreño - Villain, later good
- Marianela González as Pandora Emilia Villanueva Mercouri de Rosales / Pandora Emilia Villanueva Crespo / Hugo Fuguett / Sirena
- Flavio Caballero as Juan Angel Villanueva
- Jeronimo Gil as Franklin de Jesús Carreño Soler
- Luciano D'Alessandro as Roman Fonseca - Villain
- Belen Marrero as Camelia Rivero de Lorenz "Muñeca"
- Felix Loreto as Lorenzo Lorenz "Lolo" - Villain
- Aileen Celeste as Ariadna Villanueva Mercouri/Ariadna Villanueva Crespo de Fonseca - Villain, later good
- Carlos Alvarez as Aquiles Villanueva Mercouri / Aquiles Villanueva Crespo
- Prakriti Maduro as Ninfa del Valle De Julia
- Amalia Perez Diaz as Doña Celeste Villanueva Arismendi de Dupont
- Carlos Marquez as Don Segundo Villanueva Arismendi
- Marcos Moreno as Roque Julia - Villain
- Ana Beatriz Osorio as Beatriz Teresa Carreño Páez
- Hugo Vásquez as Jordi Rosales Visoso
- Sandra Martinez as Fabiola Fonseca - Villain
- Daniel Anibal Blasco as Samuel Robinson
- Mayra Africano as Nereida López - Villain
- Nathalie Cortez as Jessica Lopez "J.Lo"
- Mimi Lazo as Eva Lanz Alvarado vda. de Villanueva
- Kareliz Ollarves as Debora Pereira - Villain
- Laureano Olivares as Careperro
- Rodolfo Renwick as Jorge Campos
- Sonia Villamizar as Natalia
- Aleska Diaz Granados as Vivian Duran
- Daniel Alvarado as Cap. Jose Manuel Sevilla / Lirio de Plata
- Jose Manuel Ascensao as Ezquinaci - Villain
- Ileana Aloma as Pepa Lopez Castro "Pepita"
- Jose Angel Avila as Jose Ignacio Pacheco
- Abelardo Behna as Alejandro Silva
- Kelvin Elizonde as Juan Carlos
- Jeanette Flores as Consuelito
- Edgar Gomez as Comisario Agustín Pantoja
- Jose Carlos Grillet as Daniel Eduardo
- Enrique Izquierdo as Macedonio Ortega
- Dora Mazzone as Angelica (2002)
- Eric Noriega as Benigno Matiz
- Sandy Olivares as Javier
- Martha Pabon as Gladiola Soler vda. de Carreño
- Kristin Pardo as Carmen
- Miguel Angel Perez as Boligoma
- Manuel Salazar as Luis Felipe Villanueva
- Israel Baez as Guillermo Andres
- Gabriela Santeliz as Rita
- Soraya Sanz as Mama Dolores Sánchez (2002)
- Jesus Seijas as Mateo
- Manuel Sosa as Joel - Villain
- Elisa Stella as Doña Elena

== International Remakes ==
=== India ===
Dekho Magar Pyaar Se (2004) - Just as India was the first country to adapt Yo soy Betty, la fea, they also had the first adaptation of Mi Gorda Bella. This romantic comedy focused on a full-figured girl named Nikita Sareen (played by Shweta Agarwal, and later by Shraddha Nigam), who was loved by almost everyone who knew her. Young Nikita turned to food for comfort after she was exiled to a boarding school at an early age. Just when it seemed that fate was about to smile on her, tragedy took her mother's life, so Nikki was forced to live under the same roof with her uncle's menacing wife, Devyani (Reena Wadhwa), who tried everything in her power to rob Nikki of her inheritance. Nikki had two great loves during the course of the series: Karan (Keith Sequeira) and Arjun (Kushal Punjabi).

=== Malaysia ===
Manjalara (2007) - After Malaysians were seduced by the beautiful fat Valentina and her antics in Mi Gorda Bella, a private television station decided to buy the rights from Venezuela's RCTV to produce a local-flavored version of the telenovela called Manjalara. Using the same format, but with a few alterations to suit Malaysian cultural sensitivity, the 75-episode serial was shown every Monday to Thursday at 6.30 p.m. on TV3. The series starred Jehan Miskin, Emelda Rosmila as Manjalara, Sheila Rusly, Mustapha Kamal and former national gymnast Raja Farah.

=== Mexico ===
Llena de amor (2010) - The Mexican remake premiered on May 3, 2010 in Mexico (August 9, 2010 on Univision in the U.S.) and is produced by Televisa. This adaptation stars Ariadne Díaz (Marianela Ruiz y de Teresa Pavón / Victoria de la Garza Montiel), Valentino Lanus (Emmanuel Ruiz y de Teresa Curiel / Emmanuel Sevilla Pérez "Lirio de Plata Jr."), Azela Robinson (Fedra Curiel de Ruiz y de Teresa / Juana Felipa Pérez Fernández de Sevilla), Laura Flores (Ernestina "Netty" Pavón Romero), César Évora (Emiliano Ruiz y de Teresa), Alexis Ayala (Lorenzo Porta-Lopez), and Cecilia Gabriela (Camila "Muñeca" Rivero de Porta-Lopez)

== Songs ==
Other songs

- "La Cita" performed by Jeremías is the background music for Chiqui and Franklin.
- "Supervisior de tus sueňos" performed by A5, also known as A Punto Cinco, is the background music for Pandora and Jordi.
- "Amame" performed by Alexandre Pires in is the background music for Ninfa and Aquiles.
- "Niña Bonita" performed by Maía is the background music for Tza Tza and Juan Angel.
