= Luciano D'Alessandro =

Venezuelan actor and model

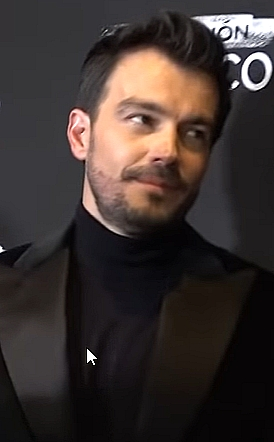
- Born: Luciano D'Alessandro González; January 24, 1977 (age 49); Anzoategui El Tigre, Venezuela
- Citizenship: Colombia
- Occupations: Actor, model
- Years active: 1997–present
- Spouse: Maria Alejandra Requena m.2022

Luciano D'Alessandro González (born January 24, 1977, in Anzoátegui, Venezuela) is a Venezuelan/Colombian actor and model known for his work in various telenovelas.

== Biography ==
Luciano D'Alessandro was born on January 24, 1977, in the Venezuelan State of Anzoátegui. At the age of 16, he graduated high school from the Dr José Rafael Revenga high school and proceeded to Maracay city to study Systems Engineering. But he later found his true passion in acting and moved to Caracas where he started attending castings for television shows and commercials. He studied theater and music with Professor Natalia Martínez, thereby giving him the opportunity to join RCTV's acting academy. His fast acting role was in the Venevisión telenovela Muñeca de trapo.

His first starring role as a protagonist came in 2005 in the RCTV telenovela Amor a Palos.

Luciano has also participated in stage plays such as Hércules, Hollywood Style and Estás Ahí.

In 2014, Luciano became a Colombian citizen. In 2022, Luciano married a Venezuelan news correspondent in Cartagena, Colombia and currently resides in Bogota, Colombia and Miami, USA.

== Filmography ==
Television roles
Year	Title	Role	Notes
2000	Muñeca de trapo	Daniel	Main Antagonist
2001–2002	A calzón quita'o	Abel Ferrer	Supporting Role
2002–2003	Mi Gorda Bella	Roman Fonseca	Main Antagonist
2004	Estrambótica Anastasia	Santiago Borosfky Samaniego	Supporting Role
2005–2006	Amor a palos	Juan Marco Coronel	Main Role
2006–2007	Te tengo en salsa	Carlos Raúl Perroni Montiel	Main Role
2008	Torrente	Reinaldo Gabaldón Leal	Main Role
2010	Los caballeros las prefieren brutas	Ricaldo Altunez	Episode: "¿Sexo, placer o amor?"
2010	Secretos de familia	Alejandro Valencia	Supporting Role
2011	La viuda joven	Christian Humboldt	Main Antagonist
2012	Mi ex me tiene ganas	Alonso Prada	Main Role
2013–2014	De todas maneras Rosa	Felisberto Macho Vergara	Main Role
2015	Celia	Alberto Blanco	Supporting Role
2016	La esclava blanca	Alonso Márquez	Supporting Role
2016–2019	La ley del corazón	Pablo Domínguez	Main role
2019	Decisiones: Unos ganan, otros pierden	Guillermo	Episode: "Sueño en tinieblas"
2020	Operación pacífico	Jorge Camacho	Main role
2021	Enfermeras	Félix Andrade	Main role
2025	Velvet: El nuevo imperio	Raúl de la Riva	
