= Carlos Felipe Álvarez =

Venezuelan actor and model (born 1983)

- Born: August 3, 1983 (age 41); Barquisimeto, Lara, Venezuela
- Occupation(s): Actor, model
- Years active: 2002–present

Carlos Felipe Álvarez (born August 3, 1983 in Barquisimeto, Lara, Venezuela), is a Venezuelan actor and model. He has participated in various television series and telenovelas of Radio Caracas Televisión.

== Filmography ==
Television
Year	Title	Role	Notes
2002	Mi Gorda Bella	Aquiles Villanueva Mercouri	Co-lead role
2004	Estrambótica Anastasia	Nicolás Álvarez Borosfky	Recurring role
2005	Amantes	Francisco	Recurring role
2006-07	Y los declaro marido y mujer	Francisco	Recurring role
2007-08	Toda una dama	Juan Moreira	Recurring role
2010	Libres como el viento	Reinaldo Torres	Recurring role
2010	Que el cielo me explique	Santiago Robles	Lead role
2011	La viuda joven	Josué Calderón Humboldt	Co-lead role
2012-13	Dulce amargo	Jesús Andrés Aguilera	Co-lead role
2015	Piel salvaje	Máximiliano Esquivel	Lead role

Music video
Year	Artist	Title
2018	Reik featuring Ozuna and Wisin	"Me niego"
2017	Daddy Yankee featuring Ozuna	"La Rompe Corazones"
