= Velvet: El nuevo imperio =

- Genre: Drama
- Based on: Velvet by: Ramón Campos; Gema R. María
- Developed by: Sandra Velasco
- Written by: Sandra Velasco; Alejandro Vergara; Laura Sosa; Rossana Negrín; Magda Crisantes; Juan Sebastián Granados; Felipe Silva
- Directed by: Danny Gavidia; Miguel Varoni; Ricardo Schwarz
- Starring: Yon González; Samantha Siqueiros; Carolina Miranda; Chantal Andere; Danilo Carrera
- Theme music composer: Jorge Avendaño
- Opening theme: "Laberintos" by Lucero and Manuel Mijares
- Composer: Enrique Díaz
- Country of origin: United States
- Original language: Spanish
- No. of seasons: 1
- No. of episodes: 92

Production
- Executive producer: Elizabeth Suárez
- Producer: Minú Chacin
- Editor: Hader Antivar
- Production company: Telemundo Studios

Original release
- Network: Telemundo
- Release: 19 May – 24 September 2025

Velvet: El nuevo imperio is an American television series developed by Sandra Velasco for Telemundo. It is based on the 2014 Spanish television series Velvet created by Ramón Campos and Gema R. María. The series stars Samantha Siqueiros, Yon González, Danilo Carrera and Carolina Miranda. It aired from 19 May 2025 to 24 September 2025.

== Premise ==
Ana Velázquez is a talented Mexican designer who, as a child, arrived at the Velvet fashion company in New York after the death of her mother. There, she falls in love with Alberto Márquez, heir to the company, but their relationship is derailed by intrigue and a marriage of convenience with Cristina Otegui.

== Cast ==
=== Main ===
- Yon González as Alberto Márquez
- Samantha Siqueiros as Ana Velázquez
  - Camila Nuñez as young Ana
- Carolina Miranda as Cristina Otegui
- Chantal Andere as Blanca Morales
- Danilo Carrera as Carlos Aristizábal
- Aylín Mújica as Gloria Olivera de Márquez
- Leonardo Daniel as Emilio Velázquez
- Daniella Navarro as Clara Hernández
- Luciano D'Alessandro as Raúl de la Riva
- Osvaldo de León as Mateo Andrade
- Jeimy Osorio as Luisa Ortiz
- Candela Márquez as Margarita Hernández
- Gaby Borges as Valeria Márquez
- Bernardo Flores as Ricardo "Ricky" López
- Carlos Ponce as Esteban Márquez
- Jorge Aravena as Gerardo Otegui
- Sofía Aragón as Bárbara Lascuráin de Otegui
- Josh Gutiérrez as Enrique Otegui
- Sahit Sosa as Pedro López
- Marco León as Max
- Sonya Smith as Pilar Márquez
- Itati Cantoral as Isabel Juárez
  - Ana Wolfermann as young Isabel
- Humberto Zurita as Benjamín Márquez

=== Recurring and guest stars ===
- Prince Royce as himself
- Simone Marval as Jennifer
- Emilia Ceballos as Pepita
- Rafael Caparroso as Ramón
- Jeronimo Badillo Medina as Michael
- Ricardo Kleinbaum as Alessandro
- Rosalinda Rodríguez as Chonita
- Virginia Alvarez as Zoe
- Jacqueline Bracamontes as herself
- Claudio de la Torre as Rodrigo
- Zoey Albert as Susan Sánchez
- Camilo Andres Chaverra as Peter
- Jairo Calero as Andrés
- Athina Marturet as Sophie Blum
- Carlos "Caramelo" Cruz as himself
- Giancarlo Pasqualotto as Oliver
- Roberto Escobar as Francisco Castro
- Gloria Trevi as herself
- Mar Jon as William
- Felicia Mercado as Teresa
- Alexis & Fido as themselves
- Henry Zakka as Lorenzo Spinetti
- Mónica Sánchez Navarro as Emma Cano
- Flor Núñez as Camille Cano
- Lupita Ferrer as Juliette Cano
- Elizabeth Gutiérrez as Sara Sahagún
- Ricardo Chávez as Fernando Sahagún
- Arianne Martin Giron as Mariana
- Carlos Arreaza as Mark
- Jeronimo Cantillo as Randy Brave
- Guillermo Galindo as David Andrade
- Anagabriel Marcoccia as Sofía Márquez
- Karla Monroig as Samantha White
- José Vicente Pinto as Leonardo Brown
- Aniluli Muñecas as Marina Sorrano
- Marjorie Magri as Laura Giliberti
- Eduardo Orozco as Víctor
- Ezequiel Montalt as Jim
- Manu Manzo as Madison
- Carlos Guerrero as Valentín Robalcaba
- Gonzalo Zulueta as Thomas
- Carolina Spichiger as Elena
- Emma Mizrahi as Ángela "Angie" López
- Carla Rodríguez as Megan Ashford
- Ana Bárbara as herself
- Anna Sobero as Hortensia
- Edgar Ojeda as Eleuterio López
- Alejandra Azur as Carol
- Edward Nutkiewicz as Mateo's father
- Víctor Cámara as Enzo Cafiero
- Rodolfo Salas as Marco Cafiero
- Paloma Márquez as Tania
- Alex Angel Rosguer as Chiquetete Martínez
- Pedro Pablo Porras as Jacinto
- Claudia Valdés as Celeste Jones
- Roberto Jaramillo as Lao Pontes
- Sofia Depassier as Mía
- Yuvanna Montalvo as Jules Santéliz

== Production ==
=== Development ===
On 20 November 2024, it was announced that Telemundo had acquired the remake rights to the Spanish television series Velvet and was developing a modern-day adaptation. Filming of the series began on 24 February 2025. That same day, Velvet: El nuevo imperio was announced as the title of the series.

=== Casting ===
On 22 January 2025, Samantha Siqueiros and Yon González were announced in the lead roles, with Danilo Carrera cast in the antagonist role. On 24 February 2025, the rest of the cast was announced, including Carolina Miranda, Chantal Andere and Humberto Zurita. In March 2025, Flor Núñez and Lupita Ferrer were announced in guest roles. On 4 April 2025, Elizabeth Gutiérrez joined the cast.

== Episodes ==
No.	Title	Original air date
1	"Carmín 76"	19 May 2025
2	"Consecuencias"	20 May 2025
3	"La propuesta"	21 May 2025
4	"Una mujer a la altura"	22 May 2025
5	"Dos opciones"	23 May 2025
6	"El vestido de la suerte"	26 May 2025
7	"Mar adentro"	27 May 2025
8	"Amor de lejos"	28 May 2025
9	"El beso"	29 May 2025
10	"El regreso"	30 May 2025
11	"Se rompe la magia"	2 June 2025
12	"Rojo pasión 87"	3 June 2025
13	"Maldito dinero"	4 June 2025
14	"Soltero y sin compromiso"	5 June 2025
15	"La fiesta apenas empieza"	6 June 2025
16	"El mismo vestido"	9 June 2025
17	"La joya de la corona"	10 June 2025
18	"Carmen Garza"	11 June 2025
19	"Todo está dicho"	12 June 2025
20	"Cásate conmigo"	13 June 2025
21	"Migajas de amor"	16 June 2025
22	"Con los ojos en ella"	17 June 2025
23	"Sin tregua"	18 June 2025
24	"Libre"	19 June 2025
25	"La cena de ensayo"	20 June 2025
26	"El vestido de novia"	23 June 2025
27	"Destino o casualidad"	24 June 2025
28	"El ramo de rosas"	25 June 2025
29	"Acosos, celos y una evidencia"	26 June 2025
30	"La declaración de Carlos"	27 June 2025
31	"El collar de dalias"	30 June 2025
32	"Mujer en traje de hombre"	1 July 2025
33	"Esposa legítima"	2 July 2025
34	"Demasiado perfecto"	3 July 2025
35	"La última palabra"	7 July 2025
36	"El cazador y la presa"	8 July 2025
37	"La carta"	9 July 2025
38	"Vestidos insignias"	10 July 2025
39	"Amor expuesto"	11 July 2025
40	"El vestido de los 150 mil dólares"	14 July 2025
41	"Lo que el dinero no compra"	15 July 2025
42	"Juego de seducción"	16 July 2025
43	"No es gran cosa"	17 July 2025
44	"Susurros de alerta"	18 July 2025
45	"La dolorosa verdad"	21 July 2025
46	"Mamá"	22 July 2025
47	"Revelaciones"	23 July 2025
48	"La amenaza"	24 July 2025
49	"La legítima esposa"	25 July 2025
50	"Atelier Spring by Velvet"	28 July 2025
51	"Entre lo siniestro y lo eterno"	29 July 2025
52	"Un comienzo y un final"	30 July 2025
53	"Tic toc tic toc"	31 July 2025
54	"Paz infinita"	1 August 2025
55	"El último adiós"	4 August 2025
56	"El escándalo del día"	5 August 2025
57	"El amor que no fue"	6 August 2025
58	"Distancia a la fuerza"	7 August 2025
59	"Inspiración en disputa"	8 August 2025
60	"Lo inevitable"	11 August 2025
61	"Todo bajo control"	12 August 2025
62	"El perfume"	13 August 2025
63	"El desliz"	14 August 2025
64	"Pacto Secreto"	15 August 2025
65	"Entre reclamos"	18 August 2025
66	"Colección de desprecios"	19 August 2025
67	"Nada que ocultar"	20 August 2025
68	"Con el agua al cuello"	21 August 2025
69	"Bajo condiciones"	22 August 2025
70	"Entre ambiciones"	25 August 2025
71	"Secretos a la luz"	26 August 2025
72	"Yo o el caos"	27 August 2025
73	"El precio de la traición"	28 August 2025
74	"Presa del engaño"	29 August 2025
75	"La verdad golpea"	1 September 2025
76	"Todo en su lugar"	2 September 2025
77	"Amor en ruinas"	3 September 2025
78	"Cómplices del caos"	5 September 2025
79	"La verdad que hiere"	8 September 2025
80	"La vida que yo decidí"	9 September 2025
81	"Entre reproches"	10 September 2025
82	"Las grullas y el rojo carmín"	11 September 2025
83	"Recuerdos indomables"	12 September 2025
84	"El arte de la furia"	15 September 2025
85	"Es mi turno"	16 September 2025
86	"El cazador cazado"	17 September 2025
87	"Mentiras entre rascacielos"	18 September 2025
88	"Con la misma moneda"	19 September 2025
89	"Mensaje oculto"	22 September 2025
90	"Más allá de las palabras"	23 September 2025
91	"Siempre tú y yo"	24 September 2025
92	"Siempre tú y yo"	24 September 2025

== Reception ==
=== Ratings ===
Viewership and ratings per season of Velvet: El nuevo imperio
Season	Timeslot (ET)	Episodes	First aired		Last aired		Avg. viewers (millions)
Season	Timeslot (ET)	Episodes	Date	Viewers (millions)	Date	Viewers (millions)	Avg. viewers (millions)
1	Mon–Fri 9:00 p.m.	92	19 May 2025	1.29	24 September 2025	N/A	N/A

=== Awards and nominations ===
Year	Award	Category	Nominated	Result	Ref
2025	Produ Awards	Best Contemporary Telenovela	Velvet: El nuevo imperio	Won	
2025	Produ Awards	Best Lead Actress - Contemporary Telenovela	Samantha Siqueiros	Nominated	
2025	Produ Awards	Best Lead Actor - Contemporary Telenovela	Yon González	Nominated	
2025	Produ Awards	Best Supporting Actor - Contemporary Telenovela	Danilo Carrera	Nominated	
2025	Produ Awards	Best Producer - Superseries or Telenovela	Elizabeth Suárez, Jacky Castro, Mónica Albuquerque & Juan Ponce	Nominated	
2025	Produ Awards	Best Original Theme Song	Laberintos	Nominated	
2025	Produ Awards	Best Music Composer	Juan Carlos Enriquez	Won	
2025	Produ Awards	Best Art Direction	Pedro de Larrechea	Nominated	
