= Roxana Díaz =

Roxana Díaz may refer to:

- Roxana Díaz (athlete) (born 1981), Cuban track and field sprinter
- Roxana Díaz (actress) (born 1972), Venezuelan television actress
