= Roberto Messuti =

Venezuelan telenovela actor (born 1972)

Roberto Messutti
- Born: Roberto Jesús García Messuti; 10 January 1972 (age 53); Caracas, Venezuela
- Occupation: Actor

Roberto Jesús García Messuti is a Venezuelan telenovela actor. He was born in Caracas on 10 January 1972.

== Biography ==
Roberto developed an interest in acting since a young age. In 1989, he graduated from Colegio La Salle La Colina with a Bachelor in Humanities. In 1995, he received the title of Economist from the Universidad Santa María and later obtained a Certificate in Speech from the Central University of Venezuela.

His first acting debut came in 1997 in the telenovela produced by RCTV titled Llovizna.

== Telenovelas ==
- Las Bandidas (2013) as Tulio Irazabal
- Válgame Dios (2012) as Cayo Castillo Rodriguez
- Dulce Amargo (2012) as David
- La viuda joven (2011) as Matias Humboldt
- Toda una dama (2007) as Ignacio Caballeros
- Amor a Palos (2005) as Rene Cardenas
- ¡Qué buena se puso Lola! (2004) as Oscar Aguirre
- Engañada (2003) as Sergio Monasterios
- Mambo y canela (2002) as Yonson
- Hechizo de Amor (2000) as Silvio Pérez
- Cuando Hay Pasion (1999) as Juan Carlos
- Llovizna (1997) as Eloy
- Destino de Mujer (1997) as Augusto
