= Amor a palos =

Venezuelan telenovela

- Genre: Telenovela; Drama
- Created by: Martín Hahn; Daniel González U
- Starring: Norkys Batista; Luciano D'Alessandro; Emma Rabbe; Alba Roversi; Roberto Messutti; Hilda Abrahamz
- Opening theme: "No Me Lo Vas A Creer" by Maía
- Country of origin: Venezuela
- Original language: Spanish
- No. of episodes: 126

Production
- Executive producer: Jhony Pulido Mora
- Production location: Caracas
- Running time: 45 minutes
- Production company: RCTV

Original release
- Network: RCTV
- Release: September 19, 2005 – April 25, 2006

Amor a palos is a Venezuelan telenovela made by Radio Caracas Television in 2005 and distributed internationally by RCTV International. Its protagonists, Norkys Batista and Lucian D'Alessandro, won the Dos de Oro award for Best actress/actor in a telenovela. It was written by Martín Hahn and executive produced by Jhony Pulido Mora.

== Synopsis ==
In the middle of a cosmopolitan city, lives Ana Jesús Amaral, a decent girl with profound Christian morals is the victim of a misogynistic society.

Convinced that women would be a great power if they had the idea of helping each other, she has the following slogan: "Defend your dignity, woman". She starts a campaign to support a famous journalist Patricia Lara, in a civil case concerning the maintenance of her husband.

In this environment, Ana finds herself once again with Juan Marco Coronel, an innocent love from her childhood and the first man who kissed her. Now that little boy turned into a bright lawyer, and just happens to be the defence attorney in the Patricia Lara case.

Juan Marco is a womanizer whose purpose is to win a bet he made with his friend Luis Lam. Luis bet him $100,000 that he couldn't sleep with 70 women in one year.

Ana Jesús is the seventieth woman he will have to seduce. It will be no simple task, but Juan Marcos is a betting man. On the way towards achieving his goal, he will discover hope and a new opportunity to love. She will meet his match, but destiny will make an unexpected move: she will become pregnant. How can a womanizer conquer the love of his life with lies?

Ana Jesús is a prisoner accompanied by three women who are described as having the ability to influence men.

Greta will discover the most terrible weapons that women have to manipulate men: feelings. Ana Jesús will gain the respect of the man who humiliated her, while always defending a woman's dignity.

Magdalena, in her thirties, with patience and traps will get the man she loves. And finally Miss Revueltas, who in her late single status, will discover the positive side of sharing her bed with a man, on the hunt for her most prized dream, motherhood.

All of them together form a clan of women, who will force men to be the way they imagine them to be which is the ideal man.

== Cast ==
- Norkys Batista as Ana Jesús Amaral
- Luciano D'Alessandro as Juan Marco Coronel
- Hilda Abrahamz as Pamela Jhonson...villain
- Natalia Ramírez as Magdalena Lam De Soriano
- Alejandro López as Jairo Restrepo Moreira
- Emma Rabbe as Virginia Revueltas
- Roberto Messutti as Rene Cardenas
- Dora Mazzone as Auxiliadora Amaral De Moreira
- Eliana López as Oriana Ponce De León...villain, later good
- Nacarid Escalona as Elvirita Quintana
- Javier Valcárcel as Bonifacio Cañas
- Leonardo Marrero as Victorino Soriano...villain
- Miguel Augusto Rodríguez as Beltrán Ponce De León...villain, later good
- Giancarlo Pasqualotto as Luis Lam...villain
- Miguel Ferrari as Numa Custodio Moreira...villain, later good
- Abril Schreiber as Greta Jhonson
- Manuel Sosa as Wilfredo Zapata
- Susana Duijm as Maya Jhonson
- Kiara as Patricia Lara
- Juliet Lima as Rocío Vargas
- Yoletti Cabrera as Doris Salcedo
- Patricia Ramos as Julieta Vargas
- Ivette Domínguez as Thelma Fernández
- Abelardo Behna as Lorenzo Jordán
- Kimberly Dos Ramos as Julieta Soriano Lam
- Gabriel López as Romano Restrepo
- Miguel Gutiérrez as Zacarías Moreira
- Vanessa Montes as Ruthy Moreira
- Belén Peláez as Paola Freitas
- Alexander Espinoza as Fermín Acosta
- Brenda Hanst as Selena Granados
- Yesenia Cuan as Kenya Impala
- Ezzio Cavallaro as El Hombre
- Carly Pinto as Marbella Colorado

== Songs ==
Other songs

- "Buscando un Final" performed by Ilona is the background music for Greta and Wilfre.
- "Amor a Palo Limpio" performed by Kiara feat. Jose Pablo is the background music for Virginia and Jairo.
- "Que Estas Buscando" performed by Axel Fernando is the background music for Magdalena and Rene.
