= Gabriel López (actor) =

Venezuelan singer and television actor (born 1991)

- Born: Gabriel Manuel López Rodríguez; 17 March 1991 (age 35); Caracas, Venezuela
- Occupations: Actor, singer

Gabriel López (born 17 March 1991) is a Venezuelan singer and television actor.

== Biography ==
Gabriel was born in a family with a performing arts background. His father Diony López was an executive producer, singer and songwriter. He began his career at the age of 9 as the host of the kids TV show El Club Disney. His first acting role came at the age of 10 in the RCTV telenovela Trapos íntimos. He later went on to obtain roles in other RCTV telenovelas such as La cuaima, Amor a Palos and La trepadora.

In 2013, he obtained a co-starring role in the Venevisión telenovela De todas maneras Rosa. The telenovela provided a platform to enhance his singing career as he performed the theme song of the telenovela titled Locura de amor.

In 2015, he and his family moved to the United States and he starting working as an actor in Networks such as NBC Telemundo, Nickelodeon and several theatre productions as an actor and producer.

== Telenovelas ==
- 2002: Trapos íntimos as Gabriel Pérez
- 2003: La cuaima as Coco O'Brian
- 2005: Amor a Palos as Romano Restrepo
- 2008: La Trepadora as Yosmir
- 2009: Libres como el viento as Andres
- 2011: El árbol de Gabriel as Saul Navas
- 2012: Mi ex me tiene ganas as Germán Zorrilla Franco
- 2013: De todas maneras Rosa as Reinaldo Bermúdez
- 2014: Nora as Guillermo
- 2015: Piel salvaje as Leandro López-Méndez
- 2017: Mariposa de barrio as Carlos
- 2017: Milagros de Navidad as Luca Ayala
- 2018: Sangre de mi Tierra as Rafael Zambrano
- 2019: Club 57 as Oso/Barba Negra
