= Jane the Virgin (Venezuelan TV series) =

2002 telenovela

- Spanish: Juana la Virgen
- Genre: Telenovela
- Created by: Perla Farías
- Written by: Irene Calcaño; Germán Aponte; Perla Farías; Julio César Mármol; Cristina Policastro; Basilio Álvarez
- Directed by: Nicolás Di Blasi; Tony Rodríguez; Otto Rodríguez; Perla Farías
- Starring: Daniela Alvarado; Ricardo Álamo; Roxana Díaz; Juan Carlos Alarcón; Jonathan Montenegro; Marialejandra Martín
- Music by: Francisco Cabrujas
- Opening theme: "Sólo a tu lado quiero vivir" by Jyve V
- Country of origin: Venezuela
- Original language: Spanish
- No. of episodes: 153

Production
- Executive producer: Jhonny Pulido
- Producer: Hernando Faria
- Production location: Caracas
- Cinematography: Rolando Loewenstein; Rafael Marín
- Editor: Alexis Montero
- Production company: Radio Caracas Televisión

Original release
- Network: Radio Caracas Televisión
- Release: 14 March – 16 October 2002

Related
- Miss Farah; Jane the Virgin

Jane the Virgin (Spanish title: Juana la Virgen) is a 2002 Venezuelan telenovela written by Perla Farías and produced by RCTV. It was distributed worldwide by RCTV International.

Daniela Alvarado and Ricardo Álamo star as the protagonists. Roxana Díaz, Norkys Batista and Eduardo Serrano play the antagonists.

== Synopsis ==
Seventeen-year-old Juana Perez (Daniela Alvarado) is a bright student with a college scholarship to study journalism in the United States. During a routine medical checkup, she becomes pregnant by artificial insemination due to a hospital error. The father of the baby is discovered to be Mauricio de la Vega (Ricardo Álamo), the owner of Positivo fashion magazine. Years before, Mauricio suffered from a chronic illness and after recovering, he had his semen stored in order to fulfill his dreams of having a child with his wife, Carlota Vivas (Roxana Díaz). After learning of the hospital error, Mauricio tries to find the girl who could possibly be carrying his child and his only hope of becoming a father.

When her pregnancy is discovered and causes a scandal, Juana leaves school and finds a job as a photographer at Positivo. She begins to get close to Mauricio while working there, and he begins to fall in love with her, especially after discovering she is the mother of his child. Carlota's inability to give Mauricio a child and the possibility that Juana will take him away from her leads her to do everything possible to keep Mauricio and Juana separated.

Mauricio's business partner, Francisco Rojas (Saul Marin), disappears during Positivo magazine's party, leaving his wife Desirée alone and penniless.

Rogelio Vivas, Carlota's father who owns shares in Positivo, is secretly planning to take over the business from Mauricio and frame him for the death of Francisco. He becomes attracted to Desirée and tries to get close to her, much to the dismay of his wife Amparo. Desirée, who is friends with Carlota, stays at her house, and becomes infatuated with Mauricio.

== Cast ==
- Daniela Alvarado as Juana Pérez
- Ricardo Álamo as Mauricio de la Vega
- Roxana Díaz as Carlota Vivas de la Vega
- Juan Carlos Alarcón as Manuel "Manolito" Ramón Pérez
- Jonathan Montenegro as David
- Marialejandra Martín as Ana María Pérez
- Eduardo Serrano as Rogelio Vivas
- Eliana Lopez as Enriqueta
- Sebastián Falco as Martin
- Leonardo Marrero as Alfredo Vivas
- Manuel Salazar as Salvador
- Miguel Ferrari as Armando
- Flor Elena González as Amparo de Vivas
- Freddy Galavis as Pablo "Popeye"
- Aura Rivas as Azucena de Pérez
- Norkys Batista as Desirée de Rojas
- Verónica Cortés as La Bibi
- Martín Brassesco as Humberto Vivas
- Zhandra de Abreu as Kiara
- Juliet Lima as Brandy Yuleisy
- Laura Muñoz as Shiva
- Gabriel López Medrano as Rafael
- Miguel Ángel Sánz as Nicolás
- Luis Gerardo Núñez as Alfonso
- Saul Marín as Francisco Rojas

== Adaptations ==
- In 2006, Ek Ladki Anjaani Si in India for Sony Entertainment Television.
- In 2010, Majka in Poland for TVN.
- In 2013, La virgen de la calle in Venezuela for RTI Producciones and Televisa.
- In 2014, Jane the Virgin in the United States for The CW.
- In 2015, Turkish version of the series "Juana la Virgen" titled Hayat Mucizelere Gebe (Life Is Full of Miracles, in Turkish) produced by Med Yapım Kanal D and distributed by Sera Film Services
- In 2017, Parthena Zoi Παρθένα Ζωή in Greece for ANT1.
- In 2019, "Bat-El Habetula" (Bat-El the Virgin, in Hebrew בתאל הבתולה) "he:בת אל הבתולה", in Israel for Hot (Israel).
- In 2022, Woori the Virgin (오늘부터 우리는) in South Korea, produced by Creative Leaders Group Eight for SBS TV.
- In 2024, La historia de Juana in Mexico, produced by W Studios for TelevisaUnivision.
- In 2025, Oops! Ab Kya? in India for JioHotstar.
