= La mujer perfecta =

- Genre: Telenovela
- Created by: Leonardo Padrón
- Written by: Leonardo Padrón; Mariana Reyes; Carlos Eloy Castro; Camilo Hernández
- Directed by: César Bolívar; José Luis Zuleta
- Starring: Mónica Spear; Ricardo Álamo; Ana Karina Manco; Eduardo Orozco; Marlene De Andrade; Manuel Sosa; Marisa Román; Flavia Gleske; Jean Carlo Simancas; Mariaca Semprún; Albi De Abreu; Guillermo García; Eduardo Serrano
- Opening theme: "La mujer perfecta" by Hany Kauam
- Country of origin: Venezuela
- Original language: Spanish
- No. of episodes: 139

Production
- Executive producer: José Solano Rodríguez
- Production location: Caracas
- Cinematography: Jorge Fernández, Felipe López, Jorge Medina
- Editors: Fernando Rodríguez Carillo, Miguel Sánchez, Rigel Sosa Andrade
- Production company: Venevisión

Original release
- Network: Venevisión
- Release: September 1, 2010 – March 14, 2011

Related
- Harina de otro costal; La viuda joven

La mujer perfecta (English title: The Perfect Woman) is a Venezuelan telenovela created by Leonardo Padrón and produced by Venevisión.

Mónica Spear and Ricardo Álamo star as the main protagonists with Ana Karina Manco and Jean Carlo Simancas playing the main antagonists. Marlene De Andrade, Marisa Román, Flavia Gleske and Mariaca Semprúm star as co-protagonists.

== Story ==
This is a story about six women who will go to great lengths in order to become every man's desire: the perfect woman. Micaela Gómez (Monica Spear) is a peculiar girl who has never fallen in love, until she becomes a personal assistant of the best plastic surgeon in the country, Santiago Reverón (Ricardo Álamo). Micaela has a form of autism called Asperger syndrome, and as a result, people around her do not understand her and confuse her as a crazy person. The arrival of Micaela to Infinito, the esthetic centre, will disturb Santiago, who is well known as Dr. Botox. Santiago is married to Gala Moncada (Ana Karina Manco) an acting mythical diva, and one of the most desired women in the country. She stands out as Santiago's best work, and she is almost perfect. But the years begin to harass her, and she turns more compulsive and obsessive when she realises that her career is fading away and that her husband has set his eyes on a woman of unusual characteristics.

Eva Gómez (Marlene De Andrade) is Micaela's older sister who works as an instructor at a modelling academy teaching other women how to be beautiful. In the past, Eva participated in Miss Venezuela but did not even make it to the finalists. Happily married to Nené López, a national football star, her life changes when she meets Cruz Mario Polanco, a business magnate who decides to conquer her, arguing that all women have a price. Polanco lures Eva using his riches and power, and works to separate her from Nené.

Lucía Reverón (Marisa Roman) is Santiago's sister. She tells everyone she wants to be a model, and even registers for classes at an acting academy, but she has hidden motives. One day she meets a man who is three times senior to her: Guillermo Toro, a brilliant psychologist who often treats patients with addiction to cosmetic surgery. To their surprise, they fall in love with each other fiercely. The problem is not only the enormous difference in age that brings scandal in their friendships, but this man was the great love of her mother 25 years ago; her passion was hidden and buried. When Maruja Reverón, her mother, meets again with Guillermo, she will want to recover this love. But this time the opponent will be her own daughter.

Carolina Toro (Flavia Gleske) is Guillermo's daughter, who is obsessed with becoming a fashion model, and goes through diets and weight loss pills in order to be perfect. She is married to Beto, who works as Polanco's bodyguard. But after crossing paths with Daniel Sanabria, a plastic surgeon working at Infinito, they begin a fierce love affair. The only problem is he is the husband of Renata Volcán, the owner of the modelling academy where she studies.

Shirley, whom everyone refers to as La popular Shirley (Mariaca Semprún) is Micaela and Eva's sister, dreams of becoming famous, and enrolls at the modeling academy to achieve fame. But her poor talent has relegated her to the most anonymous of jobs: extra. Her unscrupulous aunt tries unsuccessfully to place her in all possible castings, movies and telenovelas, until she decides to venture her into another profession where she can become a queen: the world of the escort service girls. It is a pity that love hides in the modest shoes of Lucho Montilla, a charismatic Professor of Arts in Oratory, to whom she has declared hatred at first sight.

== Cast ==
=== Main cast ===
- Mónica Spear as Micaela Gómez
- Ricardo Álamo as Santiago Reverón
- Ana Karina Manco as Gala Moncada
- Eduardo Orozco as Larry Corona
- Marlene De Andrade as Eva Gómez
- Manuel Sosa as Javier "El Nené" López
- Marisa Román as Lucía Reverón
- Flavia Gleske as Carolina Toro
- Jean Carlo Simancas as Crúz Mario Polanco
- Mariaca Semprún as Shirley Gómez
- Albi De Abreu as Lucho Montilla
- Guillermo García as Daniel Sanabria
- Eduardo Serrano as Guillermo Toro

=== Also main cast ===
- Alba Roversi as Minerva León
- Carolina Perpetuo as Renata Volcán
- Ana María Simón as Karla Troconis
- Jerónimo Gil as Beto Pimentel
- Elba Escobar as Estrella Valdés
- Julie Restifo as Antonella Montiel
- Beatriz Valdés as Maruja Reverón
- Gustavo Rodríguez as Saturno Luna
- Milena Santander as Presentación Gómez
- Héctor Manrique as Willie Troconis
- Manuel Salazar as Rolando Gómez
- Andreína Yépez as Bambi Valladares
- Alejandro Corona as Tarzán Valladares
- Claudia La Gatta as Isabella Andrade
- Carlos Arráiz as Marlon Pájaro
- Magaly Serrano as Keyla

=== Recurring cast ===
- Martin Peyrou as Emerson Hinojosa
- Anabela Troconis
- Jesús Nunes as Quintín
- Sandra Yajure as Celina
- Grecia Augusta
- Alicia Hernández
- Mayela Cáldera
- Yuvanna Montalvo as Chantal
- María Alesia Machado
- Kristel Krause
- Lili Tarabella as Daniela Corona Troconis

=== Guest actors ===
- Marco Antonio Alcalá as Jorge Sánchez
- Rafael Romero as Comisario Pereira
- Laureano Olivares as Yerson
- Hernán Iturbe as Jefe de mesoneros
- Marcos Moreno as DT del equipo de fútbol
- Ligia Duarte as Madre de Karla
- Cristhian González as Hermano de Lucho
- Mario Sudano as Toribio "El Gran Tsunami"
- Guillermo Pérez as Rubén
- Edgard Serrano as Comisario Perales
- Miguel Gutierrez as El malandro Ramón
- José Madonía as Dr. Augusto Linares
- Esmeralda Yaniche as Modelo
- Flory Diez as Model
- Pedro Pablo Porras as Ricardo
- Esperanza Magaz as Olga Diaz
- Rosalinda Serfaty as Raquel Rojas
- Daniela Bascopé as Arelis
- Maricarmen Sobrino as Herself
- Roque Valero as Himself
- Daniela Alvarado as Herself
- Osmel Sousa as Himself
- Leonardo Villalobos as Himself
- Hany Kauam as Himself
- Santiago Cruz as Himself
- Gilberto Santa Rosa as Himself
- Mimí Lazo as Herself
- Catherine Fulop as Herself
- Hilda Abrahamz as Herself
- Damián Genovese as Himself / Cirilo
- Abril Schreiber as Herself
- Luis David Díaz as Himself
- Tania Sarabia as Herself
- Giselle Reyes as Herself
- Carmen Julia Álvarez as Herself
- Yordano as Himself
- Cuarto Poder as Himself
