= Miguel Augusto Rodríguez =

Venezuelan actor and model (born 1977)

- Born: Miguel Augusto Rodríguez Garrido; 20 October 1977 (age 47); Caracas, Venezuela
- Occupation(s): Actor, model

Miguel Augusto Rodríguez Garrido (born in Caracas on 20 October 1977) is a Venezuelan actor and model.

He has appeared in several telenovelas for RCTV and Venevisión.

== Career ==
Rodríguez began his career modelling for an agency in Caracas.

His acting career began when he went for a casting call conducted by RCTV. He was then given a scholarship to study acting at Luz Columba RCTV's acting school. He studied under acting-professor Ospino, and this is the time he discovered his passion for acting.

His first acting role was in the telenovela La mujer de Judas in 2003. He has also acted in telenovelas in the United States, including Sacrificio de Mujer for Venevisión International and Aurora and La Casa de al Lado for Telemundo.

In 2012, he returned to Venezuela to play the role of Eulogio Parra in the telenovela Válgame Dios.

=== Telenovelas ===
- 2013: De todas maneras Rosa (Venevisión) as Eduardo Revete
- 2012: Válgame Dios (Venevisión) as Eulogio Parra
- 2011: La Casa de al Lado (Telemundo) as Omar Blanco
- 2011: Sacrificio de Mujer (Venevisión International) as Jorge
- 2010: Aurora (Telemundo) as Dr. Williams
- 2007: Toda una dama (RCTV) as Lucas Gallardo
- 2005: Amor a Palos (RCTV) as Beltrán Ponce De León
- 2004: Estrambotica Anastasia (RCTV) as Leon Borofsky Castellanos "El Monje Asesino"
- 2003: La mujer de Judas (RCTV) as Pitercito
- 2002: Trapos íntimos (RCTV) as Chato
