= Norkys Batista =

Venezuelan actress, model and former beauty pageant titleholder

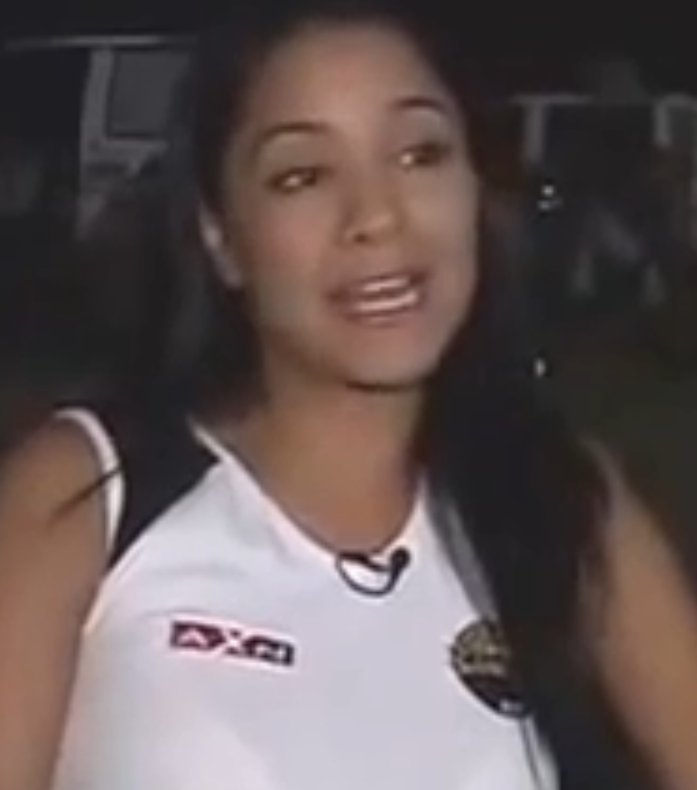
- Norkys Batista
- Born: Norkys Yelitza Batista Villarroel; August 30, 1977 (age 48); Caracas, Venezuela
- Occupations: Actress, Model
- Height: 5 ft 8 in (1.73 m)
- Spouse: Leonardo Luttinger (m. 2003; div. 2010)
- Website: Official site

Norkys Yelitza Batista Villarroel (born August 30, 1977) is a Venezuelan actress, model and beauty pageant titleholder.

== Early life ==
Norkys was born in Caracas, Venezuela adopted by stepfather Luis Batista, a chief of staff of a company, and Migdalis Villarroel Batista, a housewife. She was raised in a low-income neighborhood in southwestern Caracas together with her 8 siblings.

Norkys rose to fame after becoming the first runner-up during the Miss Venezuela 1999 competition. She continued participating in beauty pageants and became first runner-up in the Reinado Internacional del Café pageant in 2000 where she was voted Most Beautiful Face and followed on to win the Miss Atlántico Internacional 2000 and Miss Latina Internacional 2000 respectively.

== Career ==
She started her career by doing television commercials while studying Business Administration at the Universidad Nacional Experimental Simón Rodríguez. On television she continued working as a model on RCTV's shows such as Gente de la Manaña, Atrevete a Soñar as well as being co-host of the show La Tropa de Vacaciones on the same channel.

Norkys got her first acting role on the telenovela Juana La Virgen produced by RCTV in 2002. In 2004, she got her first starring role in the telenovela Estrambotica Anastasia where she played the role of triplets. In 2014, she joined Venevisión where she participated as a co-star in the telenovela Mi ex me tiene ganas and in 2013 played the role of the villain in the telenovela De todas maneras Rosa.

She currently continues touring in Venezuela and other countries with her stage play Orgasmos with actor Xavier Muñoz. In 2014, she launched her underwear and bathing suit fashion line.

== Personal life ==
After two years of dating, Norkys married dentist, model and actor Leonardo Luttinger on May 3, 2003. She gave birth to their son, Sebastian Luttinger Batista on January 20, 2006.

== Filmography ==
=== Television ===
| Year | Title | Role | Notes |
|---|---|---|---|
| 2002 | Juana La Virgen | Desireé Rojas | Antagonist |
| 2003 | Mi Gorda Bella | Chiquinquirá Lorenz Rivero "La Chiqui" | Antagonist |
| 2004 | Estrambótica Anastasia | Anastasia Valbuena de Borosfky / Alexandra Valbuena / Catalina Valbuena | Main Role |
| 2005 | Amor a Palos | Ana de Jesús Amaral | Main Role |
| 2008 | La Trepadora | Victoria Guanipa Salcedo | Main Role |
| 2009 | Esto es lo que hay | Yolanda González de Oropeza | Main Role |
| 2011 | Flor Salvaje | Zhara | Supporting Role |
| 2012 | Mi ex me tiene ganas | Miranda Atenas de Miller | Co-Protagonist |
| 2013 | De todas maneras Rosa | Andreína Vallejo | Antagonist |
| 2015 | Una Maid en Paitilla | Yolanda Franco | Main Role |
| 2016 | Corazón traicionado | Malena Corona Sotillo | Co-Protagonist |
| 2017 | Prueba de Fe Episode:Juan Pablo II | Dra Ana Teresa Arismendi | Main Role |
| 2024 | La mujer de mi vida | Evelyn del Río | Antagonist |
| 2025 | Top Chef VIP | Herself | Contestant (season 4) |

=== Films ===
- 2006: Miranda
- 2007: 13 segundos
- 2008: El Sr. Presidente

=== Theatre ===
- Orgasmos

== Awards and nominations ==
| Year | Award | Category | Telenovela | Result |
|---|---|---|---|---|
| 2007 | Premios Dos de Oro | Actress of the Year | Amor a palos | Won |
| 2013 | Premios Inter | Actriz principal del año | Mi ex me tiene ganas | Won |
| 2013 | Premios Inter | Best Villain | De todas maneras Rosa | Nominated |
