= Que el cielo me explique =

- Genre: Telenovela
- Created by: Cristina Policastro
- Written by: José Vicente Spataro; Zaret Romero; Yutzil Martínez; Gloria Soares; Daniel Rojas; Cristina Policastro
- Directed by: José Alcalde
- Starring: Marianela González; Carlos Felipe Álvarez; Roxana Díaz; Juan Carlos Alarcón
- Opening theme: "El juego" by Natascia, Waika MC and Bob Cat
- Country of origin: Venezuela
- Original language: Spanish
- No. of episodes: 66

Production
- Executive producer: Leonor Sardi Aguilera
- Producer: Ana Vizoso González
- Production location: Caracas
- Production company: RCTV

Original release
- Network: Televen
- Release: April 6 – June 28, 2011

Que el cielo me explique (English title:A match made in heaven) is a Venezuelan telenovela produced by Radio Caracas Television in 2010 based on a story written by Cristina Policastro.

Marianela González and Carlos Felipe Álvarez starred as the protagonists with Roxana Díaz and Juan Carlos Alarcón as antagonists. The telenovela also marked the return of Caridad Canelón and Rebeca González in an RCTV production.

== Plot ==
Tania is a young urban woman, suspicious and somewhat individualistic, who like most of the inhabitants of violent cities lives with the neurosis and the fear of becoming a victim of the underworld, until she lives an experience that changes her perception Of the world: they assign an important mission of redemption and love to save Santiago.

Santiago, a dedicated and responsible police, lives a tragic fact that separates him violently from his girlfriend Violeta. From being a romantic, kind, joyful and dreamy man, Santiago has a unique and imperative design: revenge. He places his solidarity and ethics on the side of resentment, rather than putting them on the side of law. Now he wants to do away with all those he suspects of his misfortune. It is filled with fury and swears to commit a cold, calculated and overwhelming revenge.

Tania and Santiago, two opposing poles with found realities, will give rise to a struggle that is none other than the reflection of a society lacking in values. He, marked by hatred and revenge. She, after a strong experience, transformed into a woman with a message of peace, will seek at all costs to cleanse the negative and dark feelings present in the life of Santiago.

== Cast ==
- Marianela González as Tania Sánchez
- Carlos Felipe Álvarez as Santiago Robles
- Roxana Díaz as Glenda Núñez
- Juan Carlos Alarcón as Carlos Patiño
- Estefanía López as Yuni Gómez
- Caridad Canelón as Raiza Morales
- Aroldo Betancourt as Rubén Llano
- Mónica Spear as Violeta Robles
- Rebeca González as Rosa Roncayolo
- Nany Tovar as Beatriz
- Yoletti Cabrera as Marilú Roncayolo
- Ricardo Bianchi as Tomás Sanabria "Tomy"
- Héctor Peña as Gaetano Morales "El Tano"
- Sandra Díaz as Mayte Sanabria
- Kimberly Dos Ramos as Karen Montero
- Juan Pablo Yépez as Ernesto Valdés
- Christian Barbeitos as Gerardo Ruíz
- Francisco Medina as Francisco
- Eben Renán as Douglas "El Dogo"
- José Medina as El Cacri
- Alessandra Guilarte as Delvalle Sosa
- Andreína Caro as Ana Guanipa
- Enrique Izquierdo as Trosky
- José Mantilla as Comisario Aguirre
- Frank Guzmán as Miky Balboa
- Eughlymar Sierra as Adelita
- Luis Olavarrieta as El Doctor
- Gonzalo Velutini as El Padre de Tania
