= De todas maneras Rosa =

Venezuelan telenovela

- Genre: Telenovela; Drama; Romance
- Created by: Carlos Pérez
- Written by: Carlos Pérez; José Vicente Quintana
- Directed by: Yuri Delgado
- Starring: Marisa Román; Ricardo Álamo; Norkys Batista; Luciano D'Alessandro; Gustavo Rodríguez
- Opening theme: Locura de Amor by Gabriel López
- Ending theme: Cuando se Rompe un Corazón by Malanga
- Country of origin: Venezuela
- Original language: Spanish
- No. of episodes: 120

Production
- Executive producer: Carolina de Jacovo
- Producer: Francisco De PAscuale
- Production locations: Caracas; Isla Margarita
- Editor: Jean Carlos Mosquera
- Camera setup: Multi-camera
- Production company: Venevisión

Original release
- Network: Venevisión
- Release: June 25, 2013 – January 17, 2014

Related
- Mi ex me tiene ganas; Corazón Esmeralda

De Todas Maneras Rosa (International title: Love Gone Crazy, Literally: Anyway Rosa) is a Venezuelan telenovela written by Carlos Pérez for Venevisión.

Marisa Román and Ricardo Álamo star as the main protagonists while Norkys Batista, Luciano D'Alessandro, Gustavo Rodríguez and Beba Rojas star as the main antagonists.

Venevisión began broadcasting De todas maneras Rosa from June 25, 2013 at 10:00 pm. Since 8 July, De todas maneras Rosa was moved to be broadcast at 9 pm. The last episode was broadcast on January 17, 2014 with Cosita Linda replacing it the following week. Production of De todas maneras Rosa officially began on January 29, 2013 in Caracas.

== Plot ==
De todas maneras Rosa revolves around the romantic relationship between Rosa (Marisa Román) and Leonardo Alfonso (Ricardo Álamo). However, an unforeseen tragic event will change Rosa's personality. Rosa's baby son dies in an accidental explosion, and this incident changes her personality completely. She becomes sympathetic, intelligent and charming. Doctors study her case and conclude that these are not signs of coping with a tragedy, but rather the symptoms of a mental disorder.

Ten years pass without Rosa seeing Leonardo. Rosa comes back to Venezuela after years of studying in London in order to look for a job to take her mother Alma (Virginia Urdaneta) for treatment. She meets Luis Enrique (Antonio Delli), a gay man who hires her to pretend to be his girlfriend in front of his family and friends, so that he can show his father that he is a macho man. Luis Enrique's father, Anselmo (Gustavo Rodriguez) is a man running a secret shady business in the city. The twist comes when she discovers that Leonardo is Luis' brother, and that the child she thought was lost is actually alive and living as the youngest son of the Macho Vergara family.

== Cast ==
=== Main cast ===
Actor	Character
Marisa Román	Rosa María Bermúdez
Ricardo Alamo	Leonardo Alfonso Macho Vergara
Norkys Batista	Andreína Vallejo
Luciano D'Alessandro	Felisberto Macho Vergara
Nohely Arteaga	Santa Bermúdez
Gustavo Rodríguez	Anselmo Macho Vergara
Adrian Delgado	Carlos Arturo Ruiz
Antonio Delli	Luis Enrique Macho Vergara
Beba Rojas	Ada Luz Campanero
Yuvanna Montalvo	Inocencia Bermúdez
Alexander Da Silva	Rafael Chrinos "El Turco"
Juliette Pardau	Patricia Macho Vergara
Gabriel López	Reinaldo Bermúdez
Erick Ronso	Ramon Sarmiento
Miguel Augusto Rodríguez	Eduardo Revete
Adriana Romero	Magaly Quiroz
Janset Rojas	Auristela Fullop
Michelle Taurel	Luisa "Lucha" Evarista Martínez González
Zhandra De Abreu	Estela Bellomo
Jose Romero	Benito Castañeda
Karla Pumar	Violeta
José Vicente Pinto	Tomás Arnaldo Robles
Francisco Medina	Nicolás
Jorge Luis Torres	Esteban Vallejo
Andrés Gómez	Enzo Rinaldy
Eva Blanco	Francis Perales
Manuel Salazar	Eliezer Ramos
Maria Antonieta Ardila	Helena Vergara de Macho
Roberto Lamarca	Genaro Barreto
Virginia Urdaneta	Alma Blanca Bermudez
Yugui Lopez	Hector Arisguieta
Marisol Matheus	Margarita Chirinos
Nattalie Cortez	Sofia Vallejo
Juan Carlos Gardie	Bernardo Garmendia
Rosmel Bustamante	Daniel Jesus Macho Quiroz
Arturo de Abreu	Anselmito Macho Fullop
Sareni Siplenko	Karla
María Antonieta Uribe	Silvia
Cristal Fernández	Vicky
Gabriel de Jesús	Pedro Antonio Macho Vergara
Rossanny Lanza	Farmaceutica

=== Guest actors ===
Actor	Character
Yul Bürkle	Asdrubal Arevalo
Germán Anzola	Dr.
Imperio Zammataro	University Professor
Grecia Navas	Dra. Rita
Raul Amundaray	Nibaldo Dijacomo
Guillermo Pérez	Raúl
Deive Garcés	Ignacio

== Awards ==
Awards and nominations
Year	Award	Category	Nominated	Result
2013	Premios Inter 2013	Telenovela of the year	De Todas Maneras Rosa	Nominated
2013	Premios Inter 2013	Original Story	Carlos Pérez	Nominated
2013	Premios Inter 2013	Best Principal Actor	Luciano D'Alessandro	Won
2013	Premios Inter 2013	Best Principal Actress	Marisa Román	Nominated
2013	Premios Inter 2013	Best Supporting Actor	Gustavo Rodriguez	Nominated
2013	Premios Inter 2013	Best Supporting Actor	Antonio Delli	Nominated
2013	Premios Inter 2013	Best Supporting Actress	Yuvanna Montalvo	Nominated
2013	Premios Inter 2013	Newcomer	Gabriel López	Nominated
2013	Premios Inter 2013	Best Actress Disclosure	Juliette Pardau	Nominated
2013	Premios Inter 2013	Original theme song	Gabriel López	Won
2013	Premios Inter 2013	Executive Director	Yuri Delgado	Nominated
2013	Premios Inter 2013	Best Telenovela Writer	Carlos Pérez	Nominated
2013	Premios Inter 2013	Villain of the year	Norkys Batista	Nominated
2013	Premios Inter 2013	Best Wadrobe	Anick Corro	Nominated
