= El Diario de Bucaramanga =

- Official movie poster.
- Directed by: Carlos Alberto Fung
- Written by: Carlos Alberto Fung
- Produced by: Simon Pestana
- Starring: Simon Pestana, Albi De Abreu
- Cinematography: Juan Toledo
- Edited by: Armando Bohorquez
- Distributed by: Amazonia Films
- Release date: December 2013
- Running time: 128 minutes
- Countries: Venezuela, Colombia, Francia
- Language: Spanish

El Diario De Bucaramanga is a 2013 historical Venezuelan/Colombian film directed by Carlos Alberto Fung, in his fiction directorial debut. Starring Simon Pestana, Albi De Abreu, and Alexander Leterni.

The film was released in December 2013. Since 2025 the movie is available on Amazon Prime Video.

== Plot ==
In 1828, the Liberator Simón Bolívar, along with his General Staff in Bucaramanga, awaited news from the Ocaña Convention, where Colombia's constitutional future would be decided. These were crucial days, fraught with tension, intrigue, and political betrayals, spearheaded by General Francisco de Paula Santander.

== Cast ==
- Simón Pestana as Simón Bolívar
- Ana Karina Casanova as Manuela Sáenz
- Alexander Leterni as Coronel Fergusson
- Luis Mesa as Francisco de Paula Santander
- Gerardo Luongo as Carlos Soublette
- Albi De Abreuu as Daniel Florence Oleary
- Patrick Delmas as Luis Peru de la Croix
- Antonio Cuevas
- German Anzola as General Herrera
- Eduardo Guino as Doctor
- Felix Loreto as Domingo Mutis
- Marcos Alcala
- Henry Soto

== Production ==
The production began in the middle of 2012, some production locations include Caracas, Paris and Santa Marta.

The movie its the first productrion of lead actor Simon Pestana as executive producer.

== Critics ==
El Tiempo newspaper noticed the movie had important historical value..
