= Estrambótica Anastasia =

- Genre: Telenovela
- Created by: Martín Hahn
- Written by: Martín Hahn; Neyda Padilla; Daniel González; Verónica Álvarez; Karín Valecillos; Freddy Goncalves
- Directed by: José Alcalde
- Starring: Norkys Batista; Juan Pablo Raba; Mayra Alejandra; Gustavo Rodríguez
- Opening theme: En Tu Cruz Me Clavaste by Chenoa
- Country of origin: Venezuela
- Original language: Spanish
- No. of episodes: 146

Production
- Executive producer: Jhony Pulido Mora
- Producer: Mileyba Álvarez
- Production location: Caracas
- Production company: RCTV

Original release
- Network: RCTV
- Release: April 15 – November 13, 2004

Related
- ¡Qué buena se puso Lola!

Estrambótica Anastasia is a Venezuelan telenovela developed by Martín Hahn and produced by Radio Caracas Television in 2004.

Norkys Batista and Juan Pablo Raba starred as the protagonists with Dora Mazzone, Miguel Augusto Rodríguez as the antagonists.

== Plot ==
Anastasia is a beautiful woman who came from humble beginnings and whose dreams become reality when, thanks to her extravagant personality, she gets a well known jewelry company out of bankruptcy. This generates her millions of dollars with her work as a model. Anastasia becomes the Borosfky family's good luck charm. However, she meets Aureliano and that whole glamorous world will become her worst nightmare. Once in search of her freedom, Anastasia will meet the dark side of the Borosfky dynasty and will reveal one by one the secrets hidden behind the Cross of Dreams, an accursed jewel, valued at millions of dollars, which belonged to the Empress Catherine II of Russia. Terrorized and anxious to save herself, she will suffer an attack that ends the life of one of her sisters, whose body will disappear along with a large part of the Borosfky inheritance. This tragedy will cause Anastasia to return to the Borosfky mansion to try to figure out the plan carried out against her. While this occurs, Aureliano will become her most fervent ally and the only man who can make her dream again.

== Cast ==
- Norkys Batista as Anastasia Valbuena de Borosfky/Alexandra/Catalina
- Juan Pablo Raba as Aureliano Paz
- Mayra Alejandra as Yolanda Paz
- Gustavo Rodríguez as Don Toño Borosfky
- Dad Dager as Violeta Silva
- Saul Marin as Ovidio Borosfky
- Hilda Abrahamz as Constanza
- Flavio Caballero as Aquiles
- Dora Mazzone as Agripina
- Manuel Salazar as Teobaldo
- Kiara as Bromelia
- Luciano D'Alessandro as Santiago
- Crisol Carabal as Gregoria
- Ivan Tamayo as Maco
- Marianela González as Maria Gracia
- Yoletty Cabrera as Pia
- Rodolfo Renwick as Mateo
- Gabriela Santeliz as Demetria
- Prakriti Maduro as Clementina
- Carlos Felipe Alvarez as Nicolas
- Kareliz Ollarves as Emilia Margarita
- Miguel Augusto Rodriguez as Leon
- Freddy Aquino asJoseito
- Cesar D' La Torre as Leandro
- Daniela Navarro as Yadira
- Susana Kolster as Claudia
- Israel Baez as Eduardito
- Verushka Scalia as Manuela Fast

== Music ==
- "En Tu Cruz Me Clavaste" is sung by Spanish singer Chenoa who made a guest appearance on the show as herself.
- "Eso" by Argentine singer Axel Fernando which is the theme for Anastasia and Aureliano
- "Luz" by Spanish singer Miguel Nandez, which is the theme for Santiago and Violeta.
