= Susej Vera =

Venezuelan actor and model (born 1976)

- Born: 14 June 1971 (age 54); Caracas, Venezuela
- Occupation: Actress

Susej Vera (born on June 14, 1971 Venezuela,) is a television actress, singer and model. She has, since 2001, appeared in several telenovela television series that have been broadcast in several countries.

== Filmography ==
- Mi ex me tiene ganas (2012) Rebeca Patiño "Queca"
- La Viuda Joven (2011) as Macarena Black
- Torrente (telenovela) (2008) as Corina Pereira.
- Ciudad Bendita (2006) as Valentina.
- Sabor a ti (2004).
- ¡Qué buena se puso Lola! (2004) as Amanda.
- La Mujer de Judas (2002) as Lorena.
- La niña de mis ojos (2001) as Amparo Rotundo.
