= Juliet Lima =

Venezuelan actress

- Born: Julie Esmeralda Lima Pérez; November 19, 1981 (age 43); Caracas, Venezuela
- Occupation: Actress

Julie Esmeralda Lima Pérez is a Venezuelan actress known for her roles in telenovelas. She was born in Caracas on 19 November 1981.

She was previously married to actor Jonathan Montenegro with whom she acted in the telenovela Juana la virgen. They have a daughter together who is called Antonella Alessandra Montenegro Lima

== Filmography ==
=== Telenovelas ===
- Para verte mejor (2016)
- Corazón Esmeralda (2014) - Vanessa Villamizar
- Dulce Amargo (2012)- María Gabriela Montes "La Maga"
- Natalia del Mar (2011) - Perla Uzcátegui Lopéz
- Libres como el viento (2009) - Tibisay Pacheco
- Camaleona (2007) - Natalia Ruíz
- Te Tengo en Salsa (2006) - Patricia Palacios
- Amor a Palos (2005) - Rocío Vargas
- La Cuaima (2003) - Daysi Chacón
- Juana la virgen (2002) - Brandy
- La Soberana (2001) - Petra
- Viva la Pepa (2001)
- Hay Amores Que Matan (2000)
- La calle de los sueños (1999)

=== Film ===
- Er conde jones (2012)
