= Anabell Rivero =

Venezuelan model and actress (born 1968)

- Born: Anabell Rivero Blanco; July 10, 1968 (age 56); Caracas, Venezuela
- Occupation: Actress

Anabell Rivero Blanco (born July 10, 1968) is a Venezuelan model and actress who was born in Caracas on July 10, 1968. Since she began her career, she has participated in various telenovelas.

== Telenovelas ==
- Volver a Vivir (1996) as Zorayda
- Los amores de Anita Peña (1996)
- La Llaman Mariamor (1996)
- Niña Mimada (1997)
- Cuando Hay Pasion (1999) as Michelle Adriana Malavé Betancourt
- Muñeca de trapo (2000) as Ana Karina Ballesteros
- Lejana como el viento (2000) as Tatiana
- Viva la Pepa (2001) as Celina Requena
- Amor Del Bueno (2004) as Eliana
- Voltea pa' que te enamores (2007) as Betzaida "Betzaidita" Conde (La Talla Cero)
- Torrente (2008) as Valeria Velutini
- ¿Dónde está Elisa? (2012) as María Antonia León
- Dulce Amargo (2012) as Cristina Malavé
