= El manzano azul =

- Directed by: Olegario Barrera
- Starring: Miguel Ángel Landa; Gabriel Mantilla; Rosario Prieto; Marisa Román; Albi De Abreu
- Release date: 17 March 2012; (Caracas)
- Country: Venezuela
- Language: Spanish

El manzano azul (lit. 'The Blue Apple Tree') is a Venezuelan film directed and written by Olegario Barrera and released in 2012.

== Plot ==
The film stars Diego, an 11-year-old city boy, marked by serious emotional shortcomings, who is forced to spend a vacation with his grandfather Francisco (Miguel Ángel Landa), whom he barely knows, on a small farm located in the mountains of the Venezuelan Andes.

In the midst of an environment that he finds hostile, with no television, no cell phone, even no electricity and a bone-chilling cold, Diego lives an experience that marks him for life. The adventure involves his grandfather and an apple tree that strangely decided to be blue and keeps, near its roots, a great secret.
