= Manuel Sosa (actor) =

Venezuelan actor

- Born: Manuel Sosa Morales; 28 October 1983 (age 42); Caracas, Venezuela
- Other name: Coko Sosa
- Occupations: Actor, Singer
- Website: http://www.cokososa.com/

Manuel Vicente Sosa Morales (born 28 October 1983) is a Venezuelan actor known for his roles in various telenovelas.

== Biography ==
He was a former member of the musical group Calle Ciega before he left to participate in the telenovela Mi Gorda Bella.

In late 2012, he released his first single from his upcoming album titled Dame.

=== Personal life ===
Manuel Sosa is publicly known with the nickname "Coko". He has two children: "Danielito" (official name: Daniel Alejandro) born on 29 October 2007 from his relationship with super model Shannon de Lima (born on 6 January 1989) and Sofia, born on 8 October 2008 from his relationship with fellow actress Mirela Mendoza. In 2011 "Coko" had a brief relationship with co-star Sabrina Salvador while filming the telenovela Natalia del Mar.

== Filmography ==
=== Telenovelas ===
Year	Title	Role
1998	Hoy te Vi	
1998	Reina de Corazones	
2000	La calle de los sueños	José Luis
2003	Mi Gorda Bella	Joel
2004	¡Qué buena se puso Lola!	Romerito Santos
2005	Amor a Palos	Wilfredo Zapata
2007	Mi prima Ciela	David Espinoza Urdaneta "El Vido"
2008	Calle luna, Calle sol	Manuel Augusto Mastronardi García
2010	La mujer perfecta	Javier Tiberio López "Nené"
2011	Natalia del Mar	Luis Manuel Moncada

=== Film ===
- Pasión de mil amores (2013)
- La hija de Juana Crespo (2006)

=== Animation ===
- Aji Picante
