= Mi ex me tiene ganas =

Television series

- Genre: Telenovela; Mystery; Romance; Drama
- Created by: Martín Hahn
- Written by: Martín Hahn; Ana Teresa Sosa; Carolina Mata; Giuliana Rodríguez; Daniel González
- Directed by: Yuri Delgado
- Starring: Daniela Alvarado; Luciano D'Alessandro; Lilibeth Morillo; Norkys Batista; Winston Vallenilla; Guillermo Garcia; Carlos Montilla; Miguel Ferrari; Jonathan Montenegro
- Opening theme: Amor de mis amores by Lilibeth Morillo
- Ending theme: Amor de mis amores by Lilibeth Morillo
- Country of origin: Venezuela
- Original language: Spanish
- No. of episodes: 159

Production
- Executive producer: Sandra Rioboo
- Producer: Romina Peña
- Production location: Caracas
- Running time: 45 minutes
- Production company: Venevisión

Original release
- Network: Venevisión
- Release: May 16 – December 5, 2012

Related
- El árbol de Gabriel; De todas maneras Rosa

Mi ex me tiene ganas (English title: My Ex Wants Me) is a Venezuelan telenovela written by Martín Hahn and produced by Venevisión in 2012.

Daniela Alvarado and Luciano D'Alessandro star as the protagonists with Norkys Batista, Lilibeth Morillo, Winston Vallenilla and Jonathan Montenegro starring as co-protagonists while Guillermo Garcia, Carlos Montilla, Miguel Ferrari and Eileen Abad as antagonists.

On May 16, 2012, Venevisión started broadcasting Mi ex me tiene ganas weeknights at 9:00 pm, replacing El árbol de Gabriel. The last episode was broadcast on December 5, 2012. Production of Mi ex me tiene ganas began on February 9, 2012, in Caracas. Promos began airing on Venevisión from April 8, 2012. The theme song of the telenovela Amor de mis amores is written and sung by co-star Lilibeth Morillo.

The premiere episode in Venezuela obtained an audience share of 52%.

== Plot ==
Pilar, Soledad and Miranda are three friends whose lives are about to change when they happen to meet their ex-boyfriends.

Pilar meets Alonso Prada, her former boyfriend who abandoned her years ago and he is now a successful professional. Miranda is a model that meets her former husband. She is now married to the billionaire Kevin Miller, Miranda yearns for a child, but her husband, who already has 2 daughters from a previous marriage, does not want any more children. Therefore, she toys with the idea of her ex-husband Spartacus fathering her desired baby. Soledad is a divorced woman and make-up artist who still lives with her ex-husband so that she can be able to provide for her two daughters. She finally sees an opportunity of happiness when she meets her former lover Pablo Naranjo who has become a male underwear model.

These three women, who have encountered men who made them unhappy in the past, now see new chances of happiness. However, the strange disappearance of socialite Antonia Paris leads to the appearance of a mysterious serial killer referred to as Los Brujos Assessinos who creates the mystery plot of the story. Furthermore, Pilar's chances of happiness with Alonso are hindered by his wife Karen Miller who is extremely jealous and is not willing to give Alonso a divorce. While they continue investigating the mystery surrounding the serial killer, the events change the course of their lives.

== Cast ==
=== Main ===
- Daniela Alvarado as Pilar La Roca
- Luciano D'Alessandro as Alonso Prada
- Guillermo García as Cornelio Mena
- Norkys Batista as Miranda Atenas de Miller
- Carlos Montilla as Kevin Miller
- Winston Vallenilla as Espartaco Sansegundo
- Lilibeth Morillo as Soledad Linares de Cordero
- Miguel Ferrari as Jaime Cordero
- Jonathan Montenegro as Pablo Naranjo
- Eileen Abad as Karen Miller Holt de Prada

==== Secondary ====
- Amanda Gutiérrez as Dolores de La Roca
- Caridad Canelón as Felipa Franco
- Crisol Carabal as Amanda Atenas
- Hilda Abrahamz as Lucrecia Holt de Miller
- Gustavo Rodríguez as Valentin La Roca
- Rolando Padilla as Bautista Zorrilla
- Carolina Perpetuo as Antonia Paris
- Miguel de León as Franco Rosas
- Mariaca Semprún as Talía Flores
- Sheryl Rubio as Stefany Miller Holt
- Susej Vera as Rebeca Patiño
- Kerly Ruíz as Kristel Manzano
- Martin Brassesco as Gustavo Rivas
- Gabriel López as Germán Zorrilla Franco
- Saúl Marín as Jesús Muñoz
- Martha Track as Dorís Espino
- César Flores as Antonio Torres
- Andreína Carvó as Alessandra Morales
- Carla García as Helena Cordero Linares
- Meisbel Rangel as Andrea Prada La Roca
- Bárbara Díaz as Georgina Cordero Linares
- Carlos Dos Santos as Enrique Prada Miller "Kike"
- Juan Diego Bracho as Ángel Sansegundo Patiño "Angelito"
- Esther Orjuela as Zoraida Ortiz
- Juan Carlos García as Bruno Lincuestenin
- Rosalinda Serfaty as Claudia
- Javier Paredes as Alirio Lobo
- Gonzalo Cubero as Shaman
- Alejo Felipe as Lorenzo Estrada
- Flor Elena González as Margot Londoño
- Marisol Matheus as Esposa de Lorenzo Estrada
- María Fernanda Pita as Valery Estrada
- Luis Perdomo as Himself
- Eulalia Siso as Emma Colorado
- Daniel Rodriguez as Dr. Almeida
- Alexander Montilla as Abogado Siso
- Gustavo Silva as Francisco Hernandez
- Antonio Delli as Detective Jose Ernesto Navas
- Paula Woyzechowsky as Verónica Álvarado
- Ivette Dominguez as Vicky Aurora Patiño
- Dolores Heredia as Margarita Lobo
- Margarita Hernández as Carlota Naranjo
- Dora Mazzone as Petra Paris

== Soundtrack ==
=== Track listing ===
No.	Title	Performer(s)	Length
1.	"Amor de mis Amores"	Lilibeth Morillo
2.	"La despedida"	Julio César
3.	"Es imposible"	Matheus10
4.	"Niña Mujer"	Group Treo
5.	"Se te nota"	Andres Cepeda
6.	"Sin ti"	Javier Zalez
