= Flávia Gleske =

Venezuelan model and actress

- Born: Flavia Alejandra Gleske Fajin; 15 May 1978 (age 48); Caracas, Venezuela
- Occupation: Actress

Flavia Alejandra Gleske Fajin (born 15 May 1978), better known as Flavia Gleske, is a model and actress from Venezuela.

== Personal life ==
Flavia dated fellow actor Jerónimo Gil and they have two children together, Allison Gil Gleske and Alan Gil Gleske. However, the couple broke up after Jerónimo ran his car through Flavia's apartment front door.

In 2013, Flavia was cast in Venevisión's telenovela Corazón Esmeralda.

== Filmography ==
Telenovelas
Year	Title	Role
1998	Así es la vida	Annabell
1999	Enamorada	Patty Parker
2001	Felina	Lula
2001	A Calzón Quitao	Lilita
2002	Trapos íntimos	Zoe Guerrero
2004	¡Qué buena se puso Lola!	Dora Fabiana Estrada
2005	Ser bonita no basta	Topacio Martínez
2006	El desprecio	Clara Inés Santamaría
2007	Mi prima Ciela	Maite Esperanza Muñoz Avila
2009	Libres como el viento	Raquel Luciente de Azcárate
2010	La mujer perfecta	Carolina Toro
2012	Válgame Dios	Dinorah González
2014	Corazón Esmeralda	Fernanda Salvatierra Pérez
2015	Piel salvaje	Octavia Esquivel
2016	Entre tu amor y mi amor	Carmen Aristizabal
2017	Ellas aman, ellos mienten	María Teresa Díaz
