= Entre tu amor y mi amor =

- Genre: Telenovela
- Created by: Carlos Pérez
- Written by: Carlos Pérez; Grecia Augusta Rodríguez
- Directed by: Yuri Delgado
- Starring: Daniel Elbittar; Rosmeri Marval; Simón Pestana; Carlota Sosa
- Opening theme: "Y estoy vivo" performed by Daniel Elbittar
- Country of origin: Venezuela
- Original language: Spanish
- No. of episodes: 111

Production
- Executive producer: Carolina De Jacobo
- Producer: Elizabeth Cermeño
- Production locations: Mérida; Caracas; Archipiélago Los Roques
- Cinematography: José Pérez
- Camera setup: Multi-camera

Original release
- Network: Venevisión
- Release: June 15 – November 28, 2016

Related
- Lo imperdonable; Corazón que miente

Entre tu amor y mi amor (English: Separated by Love) is a Venezuelan telenovela written by Carlos Pérez for Venevisión. It premiered on June 15, 2016, with the final episode airing on November 28, 2016.

The series stars Rosmeri Marval as Sol, Daniel Elbittar as Alejandro, Simón Pestana as Heriberto and Carlota Sosa as Reina.

== Plot ==
Sol is a young woman from the countryside who moves to the city in search of a better life. She meets Alejandro Monserrat and falls in love with him. But she later discovers that his mother Reina, is the woman who swindled her parents’ money and had them killed when she was just a baby. Now she will have to struggle to get justice and fight for her love with Alejandro.

== Cast ==
=== Main ===
- Rosmeri Marval as Sol Buendía
- Daniel Elbittar as Alejandro Montserrat Caicedo
- Simón Pestana as Heriberto Madroño
- Carlota Sosa as Reina Caicedo de Montserrat

==== Secondary ====
- Juan Carlos García as José Domingo Morales
- Eileen Abad as Beatríz Alicia Monserrat Caicedo
- Antonio Delli as Eloy Monserrat
- María Antonieta Duque as Ricarda Blanco / Rika White
- Marialejandra Martín as Columba Buendía de Morales
- Yuvanna Montalvo as Aída Cárdenas Del Risco
- Greisy Mena as Maricielo Morales
- Alexander Da Silva as Carlos "Carlucho" Machado Blanco
- Flávia Gleske as Carmen García
- Erick Ronsó as Sergio Tabares
- Roberto Lamarca as Augusto Machado
- Raquel Yánez as Yuliska Galindo
- Nacho Huett as Padre Ramón Echezuría
- Ornella de la Rosa as Bárbara Monserrat
- Hecham Aljad as Cristo José Morales Estévez "Torombolo"
- Vanessa Suárez as Giselle Eugenia Machado Blanco
- Erika Santiago as Ana Isabel Domínguez
- Grecia Augusta Rodríguez as Raquel Benítez
- Héctor Peña as Rómulo Alarcón
- Jhosuees Villarroel as Hugo Pernalete
- Maira Alexandra Rodríguez as Beatriz "Betty" Casares
- Gabriel Correa Guzmán as Víctor Hugo Monserrat
- Gibson Domínguez as Juan Luis
- Leonardo Pantoja as Lito
- Shaiara Pineau as Déborah Cristina

=== Guest ===
- Nohely Arteaga as Raula Buendía
- Gustavo Camacho as Servando
- Marycarmen Sobrino as Doctora Meneses Ravelo
- Virginia Urdaneta as Directora del penal
- Dayra Lambis as Magaly de Tabares
- Natalia Monasterios as Doctora Lucía Moreno
- Ángel Cueva as Dr. Benigno Dávila
- America Zerpa as Juana

== Production ==
Series production began on September 14, 2015 and ended on June 3, 2016. The series is written by Carlos Pérez with Carolina De Jacobo as executive producer. According to Carlos Pérez the title of the telenovela is inspired by the famous bolero "Perdón", composed by Pedro Flores.

=== Casting ===
On September 16, 2015, actress Yuvanna Montalvo confirmed through her Instagram account, she would be part of the telenovela as an antagonist.
