= Simón Pestana =

Venezuelan actor

Simón Pestana is a Venezuelan television actor known for portraying various characters in Venezuelan telenovelas, including Heriberto Madroño in the telenovela Entre tu amor y mi amor and Carlos Enrique Ibáñez in the telenovela Para verte mejor. He provided the voice of Simón Bolívar in the 2017 animated movie Pequeños héroes.

== Filmography ==
Film
Year	Title	Role	Notes
2005	El Caracazo	Argenis Falcón	
2013	El Diario De Bucaramanga	Simón Bolívar	Film based on historical facts from the diary written by Louis Peru de Lacroix about the last years of Simón Bolívar in Bucaramanga, Colombia, and the division of Gran Colombia. Pestana received a Best Actor award from Villa del Cine for his interpretation of Simón Bolívar.
2017	Pequeños héroes	Simón Bolivar	

Television roles
Year	Title	Role	Notes
1989	La revancha	Argenis	
1989	Fabiola	Unknown role	Young performance
1991	Mundo de fieras	Amadeo Bustamante	
1992	Cara sucia	José Grigorio	
1994	Morena Clara	Armando	
1994–95	Pura sangre	Aarón De Sousa	Main role; 168 episodes
1996	Chiquititas	Andrés / Andy	
1996	Amor sagrado	Simón Casenave	
1999	Carita pintada	Diego Cáceres / Rodrigo Cáceres	Main role
2000	Angélica pecado	Marcelo Córdoba	
2001–02	La niña de mis ojos	Esteban Olivares Díaz	Main role; 129 episodes
2005	Con toda el alma	Santiago Lozada	
2011	Hotel De Locuras		Main Role
2015	Guerreas y Centauros	Pietro	Main Role, 150 episodes
2016	Entre tu amor y mi amor	Heriberto Madroño	Main role; 86 episodes
2017	Para verte mejor	Carlos Enrique Ibáñez	
TBA	Intriga Tras Camara	Maximiliano	Main Role, 60 episodes
