= Mi prima Ciela =

- Genre: Telenovela
- Screenplay by: Gililiana Rodríguez; José Luis Contreras; José Tomás Angola; Iraida Tapias; Gennys Pérez
- Story by: Pilar Romero
- Directed by: Tony Rodríguez; Luis Padilla
- Creative director: Erasmo Colón
- Starring: Mónica Spear; Manuel Sosa; Flavia Gleske; Jerónimo Gil; Guillermo Pérez; Raquel Yanez
- Music by: Francisco Cabrujas
- Opening theme: "Es tu amor" by Hany Kauam
- Country of origin: Venezuela
- Original language: Spanish
- No. of episodes: 152

Production
- Executive producer: Leonor Sardi
- Producers: Ana Vizoso González; Jesenia Colmenarez; Ifigenia Rivas; Yenny Morales
- Production location: Caracas, Venezuela
- Cinematography: José Luis Franco; Hancel González; Carlos Martínez; César Guilarte; Juan González; Joel Ortega; José Guía
- Editor: Ray Suárez
- Camera setup: Multi-camera

Original release
- Network: RCTV; RCTV Internacional
- Release: May 2 – December 17, 2007

Related
- Te tengo en salsa; Toda una dama; Elizabeth

Mi prima Ciela (My Cousin Ciela) is a Venezuelan telenovela produced and broadcast by RCTV in 2007. It is a remake of two Venezuelan telenovelas, Elizabeth and Maite, both produced by the same channel in the 1980s based on a story written by Pilar Romero.

Monica Spear and Manuel Sosa as the main protagonists, and co-starring Flavia Gleske, Geronimo Gil, Raquel Yanez and Guillermo Perez.

== Plot ==
Graciela Andreína is a young woman in her final year of high school and lives with her two cousins Maite and Silvia, and they all form an inseparable trio. Silvia discovers she is pregnant by Rafael, a young person working in the business ran by Graciela's parents. At first nobody accepts Rafael because he is an ex-convict, but when he runs off with Silvia to get married, everyone is forced to accept him. Maite will have to fight her mother who wants her to become a doctor to follow her dream of studying music. Once she gets into music school, she meets Abel, and with him, she endures a love filled with misunderstandings and suffering.

Graciela, who is affectionately called Ciela discovers that she was adopted even though her parents have tried to keep the secret from her. Ciela meets David, an attractive young man with a flawed character, and they fall in love and get married. However, Ciela is diagnosed with bone marrow failure, Ciela does not stop fighting for her happiness.

== Cast ==
- Mónica Spear as Graciela Andreína Zambrano Ávila "La Ciela"
- Manuel Sosa as David Espinoza Urdaneta "El Vido"
- Flavia Gleske as Maite Esperanza Muñoz Ávila
- Jerónimo Gil as Abel Méndez
- Raquel Yanez as Silvia Constanza Toscani Ávila
- Guillermo Pérez as Rafael Rengifo
- Amanda Gutiérrez as Ileana Ávila
- Daniel Alvarado as Alberto Zambrano
- Flor Núñez as Gimena Ávila de Zambrano
- Nacho Huett as Cristóbal Acosta
- Claudia Moreno as Fernanda Rendiles
- Crisbel Henríquez as Nancy Ruiz
- Adolfo Cubas as Esteban Espinoza
- Margarita Hernández as Arminda Ávila viuda de Toscani
- Loly Sánchez as Azucena de Méndez
- Belén Marrero as Bernarda Urdaneta
- Elena Toledo as Rocio Tejera
- Francis Rueda as Tirsa
- Jorge Palacios as Roberto
- Adita Riera as Sor Esperanza Ávila "Sor Canario"
- Leopoldo Regnault as Flavio Méndez.
- Betty Ruth as Aurelia de Muñoz
- Juan Carlos Martínez as Marco Antonio
- Jesús Cervó as Héctor Bermúdez
