= Torrente (TV series) =

- Also known as: Torrente: ¡un torbellino de pasiones!
- Genre: Telenovela; Romance; Drama
- Created by: Neida Padilla; Benilde Ávila
- Written by: Neida Padilla; Benilde Ávila; Manuel Mendoza; Daniel González
- Directed by: Claudio Callao; Omar Hurtado; José Luis Zuleta
- Starring: Maritza Bustamante; Luciano D'Alessandro; Anabell Rivero; Félix Loreto; Eduardo Orozco; Zair Montes; Ivan Tamayo
- Theme music composer: Franco de Vita
- Opening theme: Palabras del corazón by Franco de Vita
- Country of origin: Venezuela
- Original language: Spanish
- No. of episodes: 130

Production
- Executive producer: Manuel Federico Fraíz-Grijalba
- Producers: Alejandro Salazar; Thais Campos; Rosmar Molero; Lenín Feliche; Rafael Hernández
- Production locations: Gran Sabana, Bolivar State
- Cinematography: Jhonny Febles
- Editors: Mario Scata; Juan Silva; Carlos Ortega Santos
- Production company: Venevisión

Original release
- Network: Venevisión
- Release: January 4, 2008 – September 9, 2017

Torrente: ¡Un torbellino de pasiones! (English title:Torrente: A Storm of Passion) is a Venezuelan telenovela written by Neida Padilla and Benilde Ávila which was produced by Venevisión in 2008 - 2017.

On January 4, 2008, September 9, 2017, Venevisión started broadcasting Torrente weekdays at 9:00pm, replacing Arroz con Leche. The last episode was broadcast on September 9, 2008 with ¿Vieja yo? replacing it.

Maritza Bustamante and Luciano D'Alessandro starred as the protagonists, while Anabell Rivero and Félix Loreto starred as the antagonists.

== Plot ==
Ana Julia Briceño is an OB-GYN who is happily married to Reinaldo Galbadon, a pediatrician. She has everything she can ask for: a good job, a loving husband and the friendship provided by her best friend, Valeria Velutini. However, she cannot bear children due to a medical problem affecting her uterus. When she discusses the issue with her friend Valeria over Reinaldo's refusal to hire a surrogate, Valeria offers a suggestion: that she become the surrogate, on condition that Reinaldo does not find out about it.

Valeria then gets implanted with one of Ana Julia's eggs that has been fertilized by Reinaldo's sperm. However, the situation changes when Ana Julia is involved in a plane crash that leaves here with a severe case of memory loss. Everyone on board of the plane is considered dead. Devastated, Reinaldo and Valeria find comfort in each other's arms, leading them to spend the night together. After this, Valeria's pregnancy starts showing, and she tells Reinaldo that he is the father, without telling him the truth that Ana Julia is the biological mother of the child that she is carrying.

Meanwhile, in the Amazon jungle, Ana Julia is being cared for by Bayardo Santa Cruz, the man who rescued Ana Julia. After a turn of unfortunate events that sees Ana Julia land in jail, she finally recovers her memory and through the help of Bayardo, escapes back home. But when she finally reaches home, she is shocked to find out that her husband and best friend are a couple while, unknown to Reinaldo, they have built a life based on a lie. Ana Julia and Valeria now become rivals, as Ana Julia tries to regain what is rightfully hers while Valeria tries to hold onto the life that she has created with Reinaldo.

== Cast ==
=== Starring ===
- Maritza Bustamante as Ana Julia Briceño Mendizábal de Gabaldón
- Luciano D'Alessandro as Reinaldo Gabaldón Leal

=== Also starring ===
- Eduardo Orozco as Juan "Juancho" Gabaldón Leal
- Zair Montes as Charí Santa Cruz
- Anabell Rivero as Valeria Velutini
- Damián Genovese as Sebastián Gabaldón Leal
- Gioia Arismendi as Maruja Briceño Mendizábal de Gabaldón
- Iván Tamayo as Bayardo Santa Cruz
- Gioia Lombardini as Rebeca Mendizábal
- Carlos Villamizar as Lorenzo Gabaldón
- Marcos Moreno as Atilio Rengifo
- Jose Luis Useche as Hairo Vallejo
- Zhandra De Abreu as Paola Vettini
- Susej Vera as Corina Pereira de Gabaldón
- Gonzalo Cubero as Ortega
- Pedro Durán as Pacheko
- Félix Loreto as Cayo Gabaldón
- Verónica Ortiz as Nikdalia
- Carolina Motta as Baniba / María Ruíz
- Yina Vélez as Patrisia
- Jessika Grau as Verónica Méndez
- Beatriz Fuentes as Margarita
- Christian McGaffney as Benjamín
- Liliana Meléndez as Rosita
- Marisol Matheus as Martina
- Vanesa Mendoza as Sofía
- Cesar Flores as Arturo Freitas
- Mayra Africano as Nueke/ Domitila
- Belén Peláez as Mariela
- Desideria D'Caro as Claudia Moreno
- Monica Pasqualotto as Tamara Domínguez
- Mauricio González as Omar Araulfo
- Rodolfo Drago as Yanis Alarcon

== Venezuela broadcast ==
- Release dates, episode name & length, based on Venevisión's broadcast.

Air Date	Number	Episode Title	Duration
April 4, 2008	001	Comienzan las sorpresas	43 minutes
April 5, 2008	002	Ana Julia esconderá un gran secreto	42 minutes
April 7, 2008	003	Un trágico accidente	42 minutes
April 8, 2008	004	El dolor se hace presente…	44 minutes
April 9, 2008	005	¿Sobrevivirán?	43 minutes
April 11, 2008	006	Se despiertan emociones	42 minutes
April 12, 2008	007	El destino hace sus jugadas	42 minutes
April 14, 2008	008	Padre e hijo se enfrentan	41 minutes
April 15, 2008	009	Los peligros de la selva	42 minutes
April 16, 2008	010	La boda	40 minutes
April 17, 2008	011	Empieza el tormento	41 minutes
April 18, 2008	012	El encuentro	40 minutes
April 19, 2008	013	Los conflictos	41 minutes
April 21, 2008	014	Todo en la vida se sabe	43 minutes
April 22, 2013	015	Las víboras lanzan su veneno	42 minutes
April 23, 2008	016	La venganza	40 minutes
April 24, 2008	017	Las sorpresas del destino	43 minutes
April 25, 2008	018	Destino inovidable	41 minutes
April 26, 2008	019	Fuerte atracción	41 minutes
April 28, 2008	020	¡Embarazada!	45 minutes
April 29, 2008	021	En la boca del lobo	42 minutes
April 30, 2008	022	La emboscada ¿se salvarán?	43 minutes
May 2, 2008	023	Vida o muerte	40 minutes
May 5, 2008	024	Ana Julia es atormentada	43 minutes
May 6, 2008	025	La Propuesta	40 minutes
May 7, 2008	026	Entre la espada y la pared	42 minutes
May 8, 2008	027	Se oficializa el compromiso	40 minutes
May 9, 2008	028	Ana Julia” podrá recuperar su identidad?	40 minutes
May 10, 2008	029	Las dudas y la intriga crecen	42 minutes
May 12, 2008	030	Se reencuentran las almas gemelas	43 minutes
May 13, 2008	031	Atilio se entera de una terrible verdad	42 minutes
May 14, 2008	032	Se aprovechará de la situación	44 minutes
May 15, 2008	033	Juancho decide divorciarse	40 minutes
May 16, 2008	034	¿Lo logrará?	42 minutes
May 17, 2008	035	Surgen sentimientos inesperados	41 minutes
May 19, 2008	036	Sucesos inesperados le ocurren	40 minutes
May 20, 2008	037	Ana Julia escapar	43 minutes
May 21, 2008	038	Valeria se confiesa	41 minutes
May 22, 2008	039	¿Estará viva?	41 minutes
May 23, 2008	040	Reinaldo no sabrá qué hacer	44 minutes
May 26, 2008	041	Valeria sospecha de la muerte de Ana Julia	43 minutes
May 27, 2008	042	¿Quién ganará la guerra?	42 minutes
May 28, 2008	043	Reinaldo averiguar la verdad?	42 minutes
May 29, 2008	044	Padre Lorenzo se encuentra con Chari	41 minutes
May 30, 2008	045	Reconocerá Cayo Gabaldón a la Monja	42 minutes
May 31, 2008	046	Capitulo 45	41 minutes
June 2, 2008	047	Le resultará la estrategia a Maruja	41 minutes
June 3, 2008	048	Ana Julia aplica sus conocimientos	42 minutes
June 4, 2008	049	¿Qué planea Maruja?	41 minutes
June 5, 2008	050	El secreto de Valeria	41 minutes
June 6, 2008	051	Las consecuencias del infarto	43 minutes
June 7, 2008	052	El hijo de Ana Julia	41 minutes
June 9, 2008	053	Juan y Corina ¡al descubierto!	42 minutes
June 10, 2008	054	Sorpresas que trae la vida	41 minutes
June 11, 2008	055	Cara a cara	41 minutes
June 12, 2008	056	Ana Julia y Valeria	42 minutes
June 13, 2008	057	Ana Julia se enfrenta a su destino	41 minutes
June 14, 2008	058	¿Amiga del alma?	43 minutes
June 16, 2008	059	Un pacto	41 minutes
June 17, 2008	060	Se desata el Torrente	42 minutes
June 18, 2008	061	Sebastián descubre la verdad	41 minutes
June 19, 2008	062	¿Será develado el secreto?	41 minutes
June 20, 2008	063	Las andanzas de Juancho	42 minutes
June 21, 2008	064	Valeria acorralada	41 minutes
June 23, 2008	065	Sebastián busca a su hijo	42 minutes
June 24, 2008	066	¿Logrará escapara Bayardo?	41 minutes
June 25, 2008	067	Encuentros clandestinos	41 minutes
June 26, 2008	068	Se descubren las maldades de Paola	41 minutes
June 27, 2008	069	Padre e hijo se enfrentan	41 minutes
June 28, 2008	069	Capitulo 69	42 minutes
June 30, 2008	070	¿Se revelará el secreto?	42 minutes
July 1, 2008	071	Los celos de Baniva	41 minutes
July 2, 2008	072	¿Con quién se quedará Ana Julia?	42 minutes
July 3, 2008	073	Decisiones	41 minutes
July 4, 2008	074	Paola regresa a la vida de Sebastián	41 minutes
July 7, 2008	075	Cayo se entera de la verdad	42 minutes
July 8, 2008	076	Regresa	41 minutes
July 9, 2008	077	Reinaldo es atacado por los celos	41 minutes
July 10, 2008	078	Una misteriosa mujer	42 minutes
July 11, 2008	079	Ana reclama a su hija	41 minutes
July 12, 2008	080	Se unen dos grandes enemigos de Cayo	41 minutes
July 13, 2008	081	Chari se enfrenta a su padre	42 minutes
July 15, 2008	082	Un beso apasionado	41 minutes
July 16, 2008	083	¿ Bayarado se encontrará con su peor enemigo?	41 minutes
July 17, 2008	084	Maruja busca la verdad	42 minutes
July 18, 2008	085	¿Juancho se enterará del engaño?	41 minutes
July 19, 2008	086	Saldrá con vida Bayardo	43 minutes
July 21, 2008	087	Un torbellino de pasiones	41 minutes
July 22, 2008	088	Andrea Carolina	42 minutes
July 23, 2008	089	Reinaldo le invade los celos	41 minutes
July 24, 2008	090	Ana Julia se quiere divorciar	42 minutes
July 25, 2008	091	¡El ataque!	41 minutes
July 26, 2008	092	¿Saldrá la verdad a la luz?	41 minutes
July 29, 2008	093	¿Cuál será el anuncio de Cayo?	41 minutes
July 30, 2008	094	La furia se apodera de Cayo Gabaldón	42 minutes
July 31, 2008	095	Chari recibe un milagro	41 minutes
August 1, 2008	096	El video	42 minutes
August 2, 2008	097	Ana Julia huye a la selva	42 minutes
August 4, 2008	098	Capitulo 98'	41 minutes
August 5, 2008	099	La vida de Bayardo corre peligro	41 minutes
August 6, 2008	100	¿Cayo descubrirá la maldad de Claudia?	42 minutes
August 7, 2008	101	¿Se produce un enfrentamiento?	41 minutes
August 8, 2008	102	La maldad de Valeria no tiene límite	42 minutes
August 9, 2008	103	Reinaldo creerá lo que le dice Ana Julia?	41 minutes
August 11, 2008	104	Entre la espada y la pared	41 minutes
August 12, 2008	105	Una prueba puede aclarara todo	42 minutes
August 13, 2008	106	La caución judicial	41 minutes
August 14, 2008	107	La prueba de ADN	42 minutes
August 15, 2008	108	Valeriaaplica su nuevo plan	42 minutes
August 16, 2008	109	El cocinero	41 minutes
August 17, 2008	110	¿Se aclarará todo?	42 minutes
August 18, 2008	111	¿Saldrá ileso Cayo del tiroteo?	41 minutes
August 19, 2008	112	¡Se rompe el silencio!	41 minutes
August 20, 2008	113	Se descubre el expediente	41 minutes
August 21, 2008	114	Verdades revelan las intenciones de Valeria	42 minutes
August 22, 2008	115	Pondrán en prisión a Bayardo?	41 minutes
August 23, 2008	116	¿Cómo terminará todo?	42 minutes
August 24, 2008	117	Disputas y discusiones entre Valeria y Reinaldo	41 minutes
August 25, 2008	118	La verdad revelan	42 minutes
August 26, 2008	119	Afloran los sentimientos	41 minutes
August 27, 2008	120	Decision importante	42 minutes
August 28, 2008	121	La passion es verdad	41 minutes
August 29, 2008	122	¿Habrá terminado para siempre este amor?	41 minutes
August 30, 2008	123	¿Se divorciarán?	42 minutes
September 1, 2008	124	¿Cómo terminará este encuentro?	42 minutes
September 3, 2008	125	¿Cómo terminará este torbellino de pasiones?	41 minutes
September 4, 2008	126	Atropeda	41 minutes
September 5, 2008	127	¿Qué le pedirá a cambió de salvar la vida de su hija?	41 minutes
September 6, 2008	128	¿Terminará en tragedia este encuentro?	41 minutes
September 8, 2008	129	Penúltimo capítulo de Torrente	42 minutes
September 9, 2008	130	Gran final	45 minutes
