= Roxana Díaz (actress) =

Venezuelan actress

Roxana Diaz
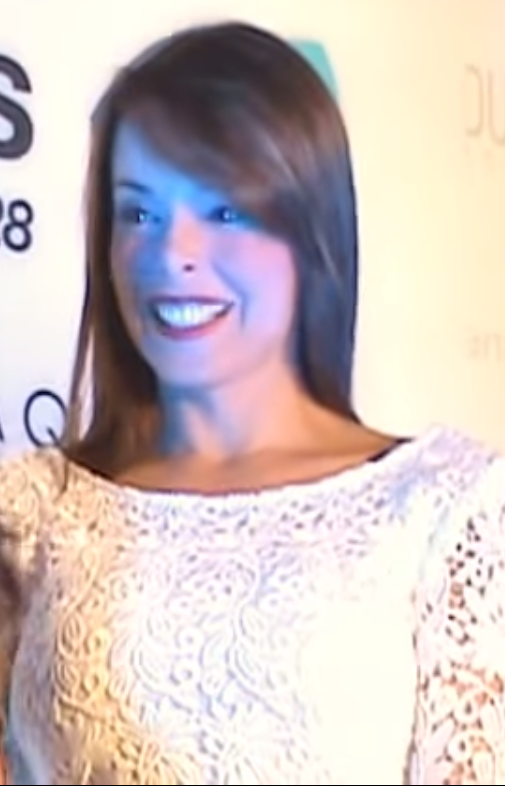
- Roxana Díaz in 2013
- Born: Roxana Diaz Burgos; February 20, 1972 (age 53); San Felipe, Venezuela
- Occupation: Actress
- Partner: Carlos Guillermo Haydon (2013–present)

Roxana Díaz Burgos (born February 20, 1972) is a Venezuelan television actress. She participated in Miss Venezuela 1992 and has worked in several novels, series and movies.

== Filmography ==
=== TV series ===
Year	Title	Character	Note
2023	Dramáticas	Sofía Díaz	
2012-2013	Dulce Amargo	Bárbara Aguilera	Co-protagonist
2011-2012	El árbol de Gabriel	Sofía Alvarado	Main Antagonist
2011	Que el cielo me explique	Glenda Nunez	Main Antagonist
2008	Pobre millonaria	Damiana Grissanti	Main Antagonist
2006	Por todo lo alto	Morana Bastardo	Main Antagonist
2004	¡Qué buena se puso Lola!	Dolores Estrella Santos	Protagonist
2002	Juana la Virgen	Carlota Vivas de De la Vega	Main Antagonist
2001	Carissima	Avril Zurli	Protagonist
2000	Mis 3 hermanas	Margarita Álvarez de Estrada	Main Antagonist
1999	Cuando Hay Pasion	Betania Malavé	Antagonist
1998-1999	Aunque me Cueste la Vida	Teresa Larrazabal	Protagonist
1996-1997	La llaman Mariamor	Genobeba Manturano / Mariamor	Protagonist
1995	Angeles y arcangeles	Gabriela	
1994	La Hija del Presidente	Pamela Alvarado	Main Antagonist
1993	Sirena	Porfiria	Antagonist

=== Movies ===
- La Señora de Cárdenas (2003)
