= ¡Qué buena se puso Lola! =

- Genre: Telenovela; Drama
- Written by: José Manuel Peláez
- Directed by: Renato Gutiérrez; Luis Padilla
- Starring: Roxana Díaz; Jerónimo Gil; Flavia Gleske; Carlos Olivier
- Opening theme: "¡Qué buena se puso Lola!" by Tártara
- Country of origin: Venezuela
- Original language: Spanish
- No. of episodes: 140

Production
- Executive producer: Carmen Cecilia Urbaneja
- Producer: José Gerardo Guillén
- Production location: Caracas
- Running time: 42-45 minutes

Original release
- Network: Radio Caracas Televisión
- Release: February 10 – September 14, 2004

¡Qué buena se puso Lola! (How hot Lola got!) is a Venezuelan telenovela written by José Manuel Peláez and produced by RCTV. It starred Roxana Díaz and Jerónimo Gil, and with the participation of Flavia Gleske antagonistic.

== Plot ==
Dolores Santos Estrella is a simple and devoted nurse working in a modest clinic. Jorge Avellaneda is the best surgeon cosmetic main center of the country. Both have very different lifestyles, tastes, and opinions. However, fate will unite in marriage shortly after they met. Motivated by his perfectionist spirit, want to make it an ideal beauty and unable to convince her to operate, lied and tricked into surgery leads up into an almost perfect woman, as if he were Dr. Frankenstein. She betrayed and transfigured now fight to reclaim their dreams making Jorge, now hopelessly in love with her, not left him nothing to fight to regain his love, just as everyone says: "¡Qué buena se puso Lola!".

== Cast ==
- Roxana Díaz Burgos as Dolores Estrella Santo
- Jerónimo Gil as Jorge Benavides Avellaneda
- Emma Rabbe as Argelia Leon
- Carlos Olivier as Fernando Estrada
- Roberto Mesutti as Oscar Aguirre
- Flavia Gleske as Dora Fabiana Estrada
- Leonardo Marrero as Amilcar Rincón
- Nacarid Escalona as Luisita Paz
- Sebastián Falco as Celedonio
- Carlos Guillermo Haydon as Julio Bravo
- Amanda Gutiérrez as Casta Benavides
- Juan Carlos Gardié as Romero Santos
- Rosario Prieto as Luz Elena Aguirre
- Luis Gerardo Núñez as Max Rodriguez
- Francis Rueda as Pura Avellaneda
- Haydee Balza as Denisse de la Iglesia
- Gioia Lombardini as Beatriz
- Raquel Castaños as Elisa Gonzalez de Santos
- Deyalit López as Xiomara Caballero
- Jesus Cervo as Fidias
- Manuel "Coko" Sosa as Romerito Santos
- Susej Vera as Amanda
- Yelena Maciel as Anita
- Lady Dayana Nuñez as Candida Santos
- Emerson Rondon as El Sapo
- Aracelli Prieto as Doña Flor
- Enrique Izquierdo as Comisario Ibarra
- Christian Bronstein as Ender Corredor
- Nathan Bronstein as Efren Corredor
- Ángela Hernández as Sabina
- Christina Dieckmann as Ella misma
- Wanda D'Isidoro as Mary Poppins
