= La niña de mis ojos =

- Title card
- Genre: Telenovela
- Created by: Alidha Ávila
- Written by: Ana Carolina López; José Manuel Peláez; Ana Teresa Sosa; Zaret Romero
- Directed by: José Alcalde; Luis Padilla
- Creative director: Tania Pérez
- Starring: Lilibeth Morillo; Simón Pestana; Natalia Streignard; Juan Pablo Raba
- Opening theme: "Con ella" performed by Cristian Castro
- Country of origin: Venezuela
- Original language: Spanish
- No. of episodes: 129

Production
- Executive producer: Leonor Sardi
- Producers: Ana Vizoso González; Yenny Morales
- Cinematography: Ignacio González; Juan González
- Editor: Tirso Padilla
- Camera setup: Multi-camera
- Production company: RCTV

Original release
- Network: RCTV
- Release: October 24, 2001 – May 15, 2002

Related
- La soberana; La mujer de Judas

La niña de mis ojos ("The Girl of My Eyes") is a Venezuelan drama telenovela created by Alidha Ávila for RCTV and distributed by Coral Pictures and, RCTV International. It stars Lilibeth Morillo, Simón Pestana, Natalia Streignard and, Juan Pablo Raba.

== Plot ==
Esteban Olivares (Simón Pestana) is a man condemned to not be happy since he lost his memory and part of his life. María de la Luz Centeno (Lilibeth Morillo) is the apple of her eyes, a recurring image of her lost past and which he ignores, is the mother of her son.

Esteban loved in his adolescence to María de la Luz, but an accident separated them leaving him amnestic. Rosaura, her mother, who does not love her son's girlfriend for being a humble class, takes him to the United States where Esteban finishes his engineering studies.

Meanwhile, María de la Luz, is helpless and pregnant. Without being able to get news of Esteban, María de la Luz has a son Sebastián (Alberto Faría) whom she must raise alone. Alejandro (Juan Pablo Raba), his unconditional friend offers him marriage.

On the day of her wedding, MarÍa de la Luz crosses the church with another couple. This is Esteban and his new girlfriend, the millionaire Isabel (Natalia Streignard) with whom he marries that day. Esteban does not recognize María de la Luz who disillusioned marries Alejandro. Fate will reunite them again, and Esteban will fall in love with María de la Luz without suspecting that it is La niña de mis ojos.

== Cast ==
=== Starring ===
- Lilibeth Morillo as María de la Luz Centeno
- Simón Pestana as Esteban Olivares
- Natalia Streignard as Isabel Díaz Antoni
- Juan Pablo Raba as Alejandro Rondón

=== Also starring ===
- Rosalinda Serfaty as Camila Olivares Sucre
- Hilda Abrahamz as Mercedes Aguirre
- Flavio Caballero as Cristóbal Díaz Antoni
- Amalia Pérez Díaz as Consuelo Landaeta de Olivares
- Carlos Arreaza as Juan Carlos Rondón Ramírez
- Victoria Roberts as Flora Martínez
- Iván Tamayo as Juan Manuel Linares Ponce
- Margarita Hernández as María Delfina Miralles
- Ivette Domínguez as Albertina Ramírez de Rondón
- Gisvel Ascanio as Rosaura Girón
- Marcos Campos as Fernando Garcés
- Alejandro Mata as José Miguel Rondón
- Eric Noriega as Plácido
- Marianela González as Mariana Aguirre
- Óscar Cabrera as Federico
- Susej Vera as Amparo Rotundo
- Yamilé Yordi as Laura Olivares
- Carlos Camacho as Gabriel Fuentes
- Alberto Faría as Sebastián Centeno

=== Recurring ===
- Aileen Celeste as Sandra
- Dora Mazzone as Paula

=== Special guest stars ===
- Hernán Díaz as Himself
- Benjamín Lafont as Himself
- Gonzalo Carré as Himself
