= Manuel Salazar (actor) =

Venezuelan actor

- Born: July 25, 1956 (age 70); Caucagua, Miranda, Venezuela
- Years active: 1990 —

Manuel Salazar (born 25 July 1956, Caucagua, Miranda, Venezuela) is a Venezuelan actor. Salazar is internationally known from his role as the nice police, Salvador, in Coral telenovela Juana la virgen.

== Filmography ==
=== TV series ===
- Intriga tras Camara ( TBA)
- De todas maneras Rosa (2013)
- Los secretos De Lucia ( 2013)
- La Mujer Perfecta ( 2010)
- Estrambótica Anastasia (2004)
- La Invasora (2003)
- Mi gorda bella (2002)
- Juana la virgen (2002)
- Carissima (2001)
- Mis 3 hermanas (2000)
- Mariú (2000)
- Luisa Fernanda (1999)
- Reina de Corazones (1998)
- Cambio de Piel (1998)
- Las Dos Dianas (1992)
- Piel (1992)
- Emperatriz (1990)

=== Movies ===
- Locos y Peligrosos ( 2017)
- Death in Berruecos ( 2017)
- Corphus Cristhi( 2014)
- Muerte En Alto Contraste ( 2010)
- Manuela Sáenz (2000)
- 100 años de perdón / Little Thieves, Big Thieves (1998)
- Desnudo con naranjas / Nude with Oranges (1994)
