= Juan Carlos García (actor) =

Venezuelan actor and model (born 1971)

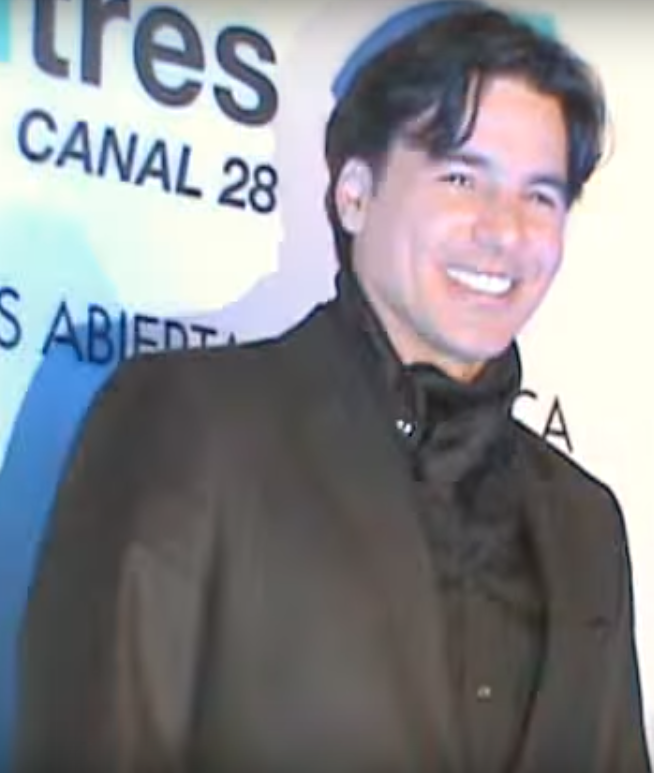
- Juan Carlos García in 2013
- Born: Juan Carlos García Pajero; January 4, 1971 (age 55); Caracas, Distrito Capital, Venezuela
- Occupations: Model, Actor
- Spouse(s): Monica Pasqualotto (2001-2008); Yuvanna Montalvo (2011-present)

Juan Carlos García Pajero (born January 4, 1971, in Caracas, Venezuela) is a Venezuelan actor and model known for his roles in telenovelas for RCTV and Venevisión.

== Biography ==
García completed his primary education at San Ignacio Secondary school and in the Villanueva School where he obtained his bachelor's degree. Soon, he began studying Mechanical Engineering at Universidad Metropolitana. But two years later he decided to switch to Civil Engineering at the Universidad Santa María.

His career began after he was noticed while accompanying his girlfriend to a TV commercial casting. After trying his hand at modeling, he landed his first commercial and quickly achieved success in Venezuela. He modeled for prominent fashion brands such as Tommy Hilfiger, Christian Dior, Giovanni Scutaro, among others.

After establishing a successful modeling career, García transitioned into acting and made his acting debut in the telenovela Jugando a ganar.

In December 2011, García married fellow actress Yuvanna Montalvo in a ceremony at Isla Margarita.

== Filmography ==
=== Films ===
Year	Title	Role	Notes
2008	Amor letra por letra	Pizzero	Debut film
2010	Habana Eva	Jorge	

=== Television ===
Year	Title	Role	Notes
1998	Jugando a ganar		Television debut
2000	Angelica pecado	Paolo	Recurring role
2000	Mariú	David Marcano	Recurring role
2001	Carissima	José Thomas Uriola	Uncredited
2003	La mujer de Judas	Salomon Vaisman	Lead role
2003	La Invasora	Sergio Martínez Aldana	Lead role
2004	Besos robados	Alejandro Pomar	Lead role
2005	El amor las vuelve locas	Memo	Recurring role
2008	Arroz con leche	Rodrigo	Recurring role
2009	Los misterios del amor	Juan Andrés Román / Jason Martínez	Lead role
2011	La viuda joven	Jeremías Miranda	Lead role
2012–13	Dulce amargo	Rubén Ascanio	Co-lead role
2014	La virgen de la calle	Alfredo Rivas	Recurring role
2015	Amor secreto	Rodrigo Basáñez	Lead antognist
2016	Entre tu amor y mi amor	José Domingo Morales	Recurring role
