= Marjorie Magri =

Venezuelan actress and model

- Born: May 2, 1986 (age 40); Caracas, Venezuela
- Occupations: Actress, model
- Years active: 2005–present

Marjorie Magri (born on May 2, 1986, in Caracas, Venezuela) is a Venezuelan actress and model.

== Filmography ==
=== Television ===
Year	Title	Role	Notes
2005	Con toda el alma	Karín	Television debut
2007	Aunque mal paguen	Tamara	
2008	¿Vieja yo?	Elizabeth Ramirez Batalla	
2009	Un Esposo para Estela	Clara Morales	
2011	La viuda joven	Karelis Abrahamm	
2013	Las Bandidas	Amparo Montoya	Co-lead role
2014	La virgen de la calle	Desiree Rojas	Main antagonist
2016	Piel salvaje	Astrid Salamanqués	Main antagonist
2025	Velvet: El nuevo imperio	Laura Giliberti	Guest star
