= La viuda joven =

- Genre: Telenovela
- Created by: Martín Hahn
- Written by: Zaret Romero; Daniel González; Giuliana Rodríguez; Juan Carlos Duque
- Story by: Martín Hahn
- Directed by: Yuri Delgado
- Creative directors: Carlos Medina; Clelly Arevalo
- Starring: Mariangel Ruiz; Verónica Schneider; Luis Gerónimo Abreu; Juan Carlos García; Luciano D'Alessandro
- Opening theme: "¿Será que tengo la culpa?" performed by Chino & Nacho and Luis Enrique
- Country of origin: Venezuela
- Original language: Spanish
- No. of episodes: 142

Production
- Executive producer: Sandra Riobóo
- Producer: Romina Peña
- Production locations: Caracas, Venezuela
- Cinematography: José Luis Hernández; Lupe Villalobos
- Camera setup: Multi-camera

Original release
- Network: Venevisión
- Release: March 16 – September 7, 2011

Related
- La mujer perfecta; El árbol de Gabriel

La viuda joven (English title: The Young Widow) is a Venezuelan telenovela written by Martín Hahn and produced by Venevisión in 2011.

Mariángel Ruiz and Luis Gerónimo Abreu as the protagonists while Verónica Schneider, Astrid Carolina Herrera and Beba Rojas star as the antagonists.

== Plot ==
"The Young Widow" is about a mysterious woman who has become a celebrity by marrying Baron Von Parker. She has an enormous fortune inherited from her last three husbands. With no known family, the Baroness "Inma Von Parker" is an enigmatic woman of extraordinary beauty that captivates men with incredible magnetism and charm. Her calm personality and self-control give her the ability to handle all situations around her, but also make her a suspect of having murdered her former husbands; however, nobody has ever been able to prove this. "Alejandro" is a police detective of humble origin, with a bright career in the Homicide Unit. Marked by betrayal, "Alejandro" has remained unmarried because of the woman who left him heartbroken.

"Inma Von Parker" is suspected of orchestrating the death of her fourth husband. The press, the "Humboldt" family, and the Police Force are constantly, almost aggressively, seeking any clues that would finally help to clarify the secret of "The Young Widow" and expose her for the murderer that everybody thinks she is. The case is assigned to detective "Alejandro Abraham". Here the tragic past that both of them share comes to light. Inma sees her salvation in the man who she once loved, but the detective "Abraham" does not feel the same way any more. "Alejandro" is too hurt, so he takes on the case against the woman who unexpectedly disappeared from his life – leaving him waiting at the church's altar during their wedding celebration- promising to get revenge upon her, and reveal her truly evil face to the world. Despite taking several years to get over the incident, ironically, after nine years, Inma reappears just as he meets "Abril Armas", a charming woman who has renewed his life and reawakened in him the hope of making a home.

The crime perpetrated against Inma Von Parker's latest husband is a puzzle. Another husband dead. Another case out of which she comes victorious. Everything points to "Inma Von Parker", but there's nothing concrete to incriminate her. Then, several questions rise up in Alejandro's mind, bothering him like a stone in a shoe: is Inmaculada innocent or guilty?.

The Baroness tries to get the detective emotionally wrapped, for she knows that their once great love is also their great enemy. A relationship of love and fear, passion and mistrust. Alejandro is obsessed with finding ways to catch Inmaculada or her accomplice. The detective is about to solve the riddle, but each time a witness can unravel part of the mystery, something happens to them: they vanish, change their minds, or die.

Alejandro has to choose between a passionate love or serene love, a mysterious woman or a devoted wife.

== Cast ==
=== Main cast ===
- Mariángel Ruiz as Inmaculada "Inma" Rojas Vda. de Von Parker "La Baronesa"
- Verónica Schneider as Abril Armas
- Luis Gerónimo Abreu as Alejandro Abraham
- Juan Carlos García as Jeremías Miranda. Villain
- Luciano D'Alessandro as Christian Humboldt. Villain

=== Also starring ===
- Miguel de León as Vespasiano Calderón
- Astrid Carolina Herrera as Ivana Humboldt de Calderón. Villain
- Carlos Mata as Ángel Abraham
- Carlos Cruz as Rogelio Galíndez
- María Antonieta Duque as Iris Fuenmayor / Vilma Bravo
- Iván Tamayo as Simón Madero
- Rafael Romero as Tirso Damasco
- Javier Vidal as Federico Humboldt
- Eva Blanco as Elda Lugo
- Sonia Villamizar as Peggy Pardo-Pardo
- Beba Rojas as Vicenta Palacios de Humboldt. Villain
- Antonio Delli as Julio Castillo. Villain

=== Supporting cast ===
- José Luis Useche as Domingo Parada
- Paula Bevilacqua as Grecia Burgos
- Elio Pietrini as Don Elías
- Jose Romero as Leonel Hernández
- Yelena Maciel as Luna Sosa / Ruth Luna "La Pelusa"
- Sheryl Rubio as Sofía Carlota Calderón Humboldt
- Carlos Felipe Álvarez as Josué Calderón Humboldt
- Marjorie Magri as Karelis Abraham
- Aileen Celeste as Vanessa Humboldt de Castillo
- Susej Vera as Macarena Black. Villain
- Eleidy Aparicio as África Porras
- Claudio de la Torre as Enmanuel Madero. Main Villain. Serial-killer.
- César Flores as Pedro. Villain
- Crisbel Henríquez as Claudia Pardo-Pardo
- Josette Vidal Restifo as Julie Castillo Humboldt
- Stephanie Cardone as Sonia. Villain
- José Vicente Pinto as Rosario Tabares
- Andreína Carvó as Sandra Reverón
- Guillermo Roa as Sebastián Madero
- Meisbel Rangel as La niña fantasma
- Roberto Messuti as Matías Humboldt. Villain
- Hans Christopher as Peter Von Parker
- Ray Torres as Orlando
- Jean Carlo Simancas as Salomón Grum "El Pelúo" / Diego Luna
- Carlos Guillermo Haydon as Thomas Rulfo. Villain
- Prakriti Maduro as Clarisa.

Villain

- Beatriz Vázquez as Rita
- Jaime Araque as Salvatore Bonvicini
- Diana Marcoccia as Janet "Neta" Calderón Humboldt
- Catherina Cardozo as Francesca Bonvicini
- Alejo Felipe as Pascual Bonvicini
- Manuel Salazar - Ernesto
- José Vieira - Denis Rodríguez
- Emma Rabbe as Dra. Penélope Arrechero
- Gustavo Rodríguez as Ignacio
- Edgard Serrano as Asistente de la Viuda Negra

== Reception ==
- In its final episode La viuda joven was a resounding success and had a 79% viewer share (Of 100 television stations, 79 were tuned to the channel) and 15 points rating. It had been years since Venevision had such a large audience share. Venezuelan audiences were locked in from start to finish to see who was the murderer in this story.
- In Georgia this telenovela began on June 22, 2011 on Rustavi 2 TV at 19:45. From September 12, it was removed from prime-time to 18:45. After 115 episodes it was rescheduled to weekends at 17:00.
- In Mexico on Cadenatres, the morning schedule was changed from 9am to prime time at 8pm due to the large tuning obtained.
- La Viuda Joven on youtube was most watched in Venezuela, Ecuador and Georgia.
