= Yuvanna Montalvo =

Venezuelan model and actress (born 1988)

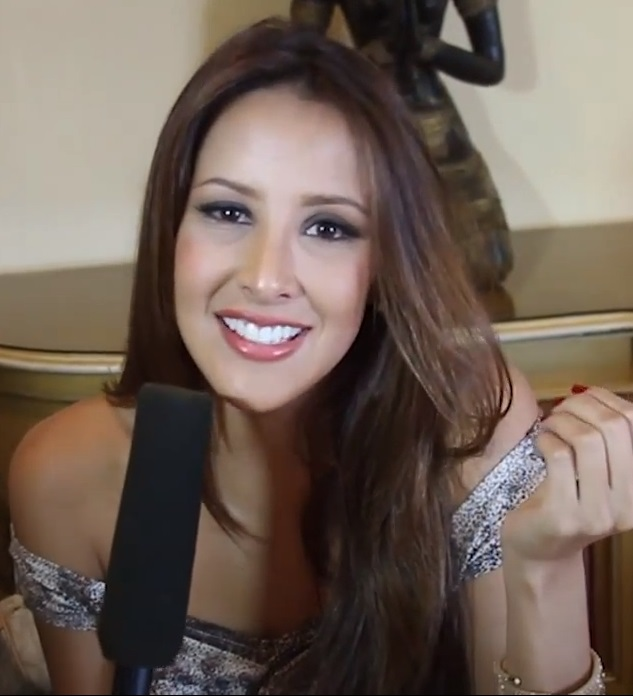
- Born: March 15, 1988 (age 38); Mexico City, Mexico
- Occupations: Model, Actress
- Spouse: Juan Carlos García

Yuvanna Montalvo (born 15 March 1988) is a Venezuelan model and actress.

== Biography ==
She began her acting career in 2007 with a guest role in the teen telenovela Somos tu y yo. Since then, she has appeared in several telenovelas produced by Venevisión such as La mujer perfecta and Válgame Dios where she was one of the co-stars.

In 2011, she married her boyfriend and fellow actor Juan Carlos García. The couple announced they had welcomed a baby girl in February 2017 .

In 2013, she became an advertising model for Chicas Polar.

She starred in the telenovela De todas maneras Rosa in 2013.

== Filmography ==
Television
| Year | Title | Role |
|---|---|---|
| 2007-2008 | Somos tu y yo | Yuvanna |
| 2009 | Somos tú y yo: Un Nuevo Día | Yuvanna |
| 2010 | La mujer perfecta | Chantal |
| 2012 | Válgame Dios | Mayerling Torres de Bracho |
| 2012 | Los secretos de Lucía | Giselle |
| 2013 | De todas maneras Rosa | Inocencia Bermudez |
| 2016 | Entre tu amor y mi amor | Aída Cárdenas Del Risco |
