= Muñeca de trapo =

- Genre: Telenovela; Romance; Drama
- Created by: Inés Rodena
- Written by: Rodolfo Boyandjián; Ana Teresa Sosa; Neida Padilla
- Directed by: Gracio D'Angelo; Luis Padilla
- Starring: Karina Orozco; Adrián Delgado; Eduardo Serrano; Rodolfo Drago
- Opening theme: Muñeca de trapo by Jose A. Bordell
- Ending theme: Muñeca de trapo by Jose A. Bordell
- Country of origin: Venezuela
- Original language: Spanish
- No. of episodes: 138

Production
- Executive producer: Miguel Angel Villasmil
- Producer: Carolina de Jacobo
- Production location: Caracas
- Camera setup: Multi-camera
- Running time: 41-44 minutes
- Production company: Venevisión

Original release
- Network: Venevisión
- Release: 20 February – 18 August 2000

Related
- La gata (1968); Cara sucia (1992); La gata (2014)

Muñeca de trapo is a Venezuelan telenovela produced by Venevisión in 2000. It was adapted from the 1968 telenovela La gata written by Inés Rodena. Rodolfo Boyandjián, Ana Teresa Sosa and Neida Padilla wrote this new adaptation.

On February 20, 2000, Venevisión started broadcasting Muñeca de trapo weekdays at 9:00pm. The last episode was broadcast on August 18, 2000.

Karina Orozco and Adrián Delgado starred as the main protagonists with Rodolfo Drago and Rebeca González as the main antagonists.

== Plot ==
Destiny plays a cruel trick on Laurita Arteaga. Born into a wealthy family, she is separated from them as a baby due to the evil schemes of Luis Felipe Montesinos who due to jealousy, steals away her father's fortune and murders her mother while putting the blame on him. Eugenio Arteaga, her father, is sent to jail for a crime he didn't commit. On the day Laurita's mother is murdered, her nanny arrives in their house when the crime is being committed, and as she attempts to escape with the baby, Luis Felipe follows her in his car and hits her. Lying helpless, they are later found by the nursemaid's mother Doña Coromoto who raises up Laurita. Years later, Laurita has grown into a young woman who is being exploited by her foster mother Doña Coromoto by being sent out to look for scraps to sell and also newspapers. In the slum where they live, Laurita has been nicknamed "rag doll" by the neighbors because of her beauty and noble hears. One day, Laurita comes face to face with Alejandro Montesinos, the son of the man who ruined her father's life. Despite their social differences, they fall in love with each other. Once again, the Montesinos family will bring suffering to Laurita. But she will be reunited with her father and come back to get revenge on those who wronged her in the past.

== Cast ==
- Karina Orozco as Laurita Arteaga
- Adrián Delgado as Alejandro Montesinos
- Rodolfo Drago as Luis Felipe Montesinos
- Eduardo Serrano as Eugenio Arteaga
- Esperanza Magaz as Doña Coromoto
- Rebeca González as Ernestina Montesinos
- Anabell Rivero as Ana Karina
- Francisco Mariño as Sergio Montesinos
- Lourdes Martínez as Adriana Montesinos
- Carlos Omaña as Padre Pitcher
- Marcos Campos as David
- Lourdes Martínez as Adriana Montesinos
- Magaly Serrano as Yahaira
