= List of programs broadcast by RCTV =

This is a list of programs formerly broadcast by Radio Caracas Televisión (this list includes Radio Caracas Televisión's original productions only).

== Currently broadcast by RCTV ==
=== News ===
- Alerta (1975–1999; 2006–2010)
- Los Chismes De La Bicha (2007–2010)
- La Entrevista (2001–2010)
- El Observador (1953–2012)

=== Telenovelas ===
- Por todo lo alto
- Camaleona
- Mujer con pantalones
- La Invasora
- Hoy te vi
- Niña mimada

=== Reality ===
- Ají Picante (2000–2010)
- Casting RCTV (2004)
- Date con Todo (2006)
- Fama y Aplausos / Fama Sudor y Lágrimas (2001–2007)
- Justicia Para Todos (1999–2000)
- Montados en la olla (2008–2010)
- La Pareja Dispareja (2008)

=== Talk show/variety ===
- A Puerta Cerrada (1983–1997; 2007–2010)
- Un Angel En El Observador (1999–2007)
- Cita Con Las Estrellas (2003)
- De Boca En Boca (1999)
- Loco Video Loco (1992–2010)
- Momentos RCTV (2007)
- Poniendo La Comica (2007)
- Radio Rochela (1961–2010)
- Sábado Espectacular (1968–1971, 1989–1990, 1999)
- Sábado Mundial (1992–1995)
- El Show de Renny (1958–1959; 1961–1962; 1964–1965; 1967–1971)

=== Game show ===
- Al Pie de la Letra (2006–2007)
- Aló RCTV (1999–2000)
- Aprieta y Gana (2000–2006)
- Arranca (2005–2006)
- Avízzzpate (1999–2000)
- Concurso Millonario (1986–1988)
- El Precio Justo (2002-2004)
- ¿Quién Quiere Ser Millonario? (2000–present)

=== Documentary ===
- Bitácora (1994–present)

== Formerly broadcast by RCTV ==
=== News programs ===
- La Voz de la Revolución (1958)
- Tertulia (1962)
- Primer Plano (1976–1986; 1987–1994; 1995; 1996; 1997-????; 200?-2004; 2006)
- Lo de Hoy es Noticia (1983-199?)
- Dicen y Hacen (1998)
- El Observador Junior (1999–2001)

=== Drama/soap opera ===
- Kaleidoscopio (1953–1957)
- Anecdotario (1953–1954)
- Teatro del Lunes (1954–1956)
- Gran Teatro (1954–1955)
- Ciclorama (1954)
- Cuentos del Camino (1954–1955)
- Candilejas (1954–1955)
- Camay (1954)
- Palmolive (1956)
- La Única (1957)
- La Novela LM (1957)
- Mi Hermano Satans (1957)
- Detrás del Telón (1957)
- Tinieblas en el Corazón (1958)
- Luz y Sombras (1958)
- El Primer Milagro (1958)
- El País Perdido (1958)
- El Castillo de Hierro (1959)
- Su Mala Hora (1959)
- Ante la Ley (1960)
- El Precio de Una Vida (1961–1963)
- La Novela del Hogar (1964)
- La Novela de Pasion (1964)
- La Novela Romantica (1964)
- El Derecho de Nacer (1965) (based on the Mexican version)
- La Tirana (1964)
- Historia de Tres Hermanas (1964)
- Yo Compro a Esa mujer (1965)
- Amor sin Fronteras (1965) (original version aired on Venevision) (1992)
- Chinita, mi amor (1965)
- Cimarron (1965)
- Clemencia (1966)
- Cuando el Cielo es Más Azul (1966)
- El Alma no tiene Color (1966)
- El Engaño (1967)
- La Cruz de Palo (1967)
- La historia de un Canalla (1967)
- La Indomable (1967, last aired in 1975)
- La Italianita (1967–1968)
- La Posada Maldita (1968)
- Los Ojos que Vigilan (1968)
- Mama Trompeta (1968)
- Mariana Montiel (1969)
- Mi Secreto me Condena (1969)
- Selva, la Virgen de Barro (1969)
- Tormenta de Pasión (1969)
- Un Pedazo de Cielo (1970)
- Doña Bárbara (1975)
- Estefania (1979)
- Raquel (1979)
- La Hija de Juana Crespo (1977)
- La Señora de Cárdenas (1977)
- La Fiera (1978)
- Abandonada (1978)
- Alejandra (1971)
- Boves, El Urogallo (1971)
- Campeones (1971)
- Carolina (1976)
- Canaima (1972)
- Cristina (1972)
- El Hombre de la Máscara de Hierro (1972)
- La Comadre (1979)
- La Balandra Isabel Llegó esta Tarde (1979)
- La Indomable (1975)
- La Trepadora (1975)
- Mabel Valdez (1975)
- Mariela, Mariela (1975)
- O.K. (1977)
- Piel de Sapa (1978)
- Pobre Negro (1978)
- Sabrina (1976)
- Sacrificio de Mujer (1977)
- Silvia Rivas, divorciada (1977)
- Sobre la Misma Tierra (1971)
- Soltera y sin Compromiso (1978)
- Sonia (1976)
- Tormento (1977)
- Tuya Para Siempre (1974)
- TV Confidencial (1977)
- Valentina (1979)
- Elizabeth (1980)
- Muñequita (1980)
- Natalia de 8 a 9 (1980)
- Mi Hijo Gabriel (1980)
- Gómez I (1980)
- Gómez II (1981)
- Marielena (1981)
- Luz Marina (1981)
- Luisana Mia (1981)
- El Esposo de Anaís (1981)
- Angelito (1981)
- La Señorita Perdomo (1982)
- Qué pasó con Jacqueline? (1982)
- Kapricho S.A. (1982)
- La Goajirita (1982)
- Claudia (1982)
- Leonela (1983)
- Chao Cristina (1983)
- Marta y Javier (1983)
- Bienvenida Esperanza (1983)
- Ciclo de Oro de Rómulo Gallegos (1984)
- La Salvaje (1984)
- Marisela (1984)
- Topacio (1984)
- Azucena (1984)
- Rebeca (1985)
- Adriana (1985)
- Cristal (1985–1986)
- Atrévete (1986)
- La Dama de Rosa (1986)
- La Pasion de Teresa (1987)
- La Intrusa (1987)
- Primavera (1988)
- Señora (1988)
- Alma Mia (1988)
- Abigail (1988)
- Rubi Rebelde (1989)
- Pobre Negro (1989)
- El Engaño (1989)
- Amanda Sabater (1989)
- Alondra (1989)
- De Mujeres (1990)
- Carmen Querida (1990)
- Anabel (1990)
- Gardenia (1990)
- Caribe (1990)
- El Desprecio (1991)
- Eva Marina (1992)
- Kassandra (1992–1993)
- Por Estas Calles (1992–1994)
- Dulce Ilusión (1993)
- De Oro Puro (1993–1994)
- Pura Sangre (1994)
- Entrega Total (1995)
- Amores de Fin de Siglo (1995)
- El Desafío (1995)
- Ilusiones (1995)
- La Inolvidable (1996)
- Volver a Vivir (1996)
- Los Amores de Anita Peña (1996)
- Maria de los Angeles (1997)
- Niña mimada (1998)
- Cambio de Piel (1997–1998)
- Aunque me Cueste la Vida (1998)
- Reina de Corazones (1998)
- Hoy te Vi (1998)
- Luisa Fernanda (1998–1999)
- Mujer Secreta (1999)
- Carita Pintada (1999)
- Mariú (2000)
- Hay Amores Que Matan (2000)
- Mis Tres Hermanas (2000)
- Angelica Pecado (2000)
- Carissima (2001)
- Viva la Pepa (2001)
- La Niña de mis ojos (2001)
- La Mujer de Judas (2001)
- La Soberana (2001)
- A Calzon Quitao (2001)
- Juana la Virgen (2002)
- Trapos Íntimos (2002)
- Mi Gorda Bella (2002)
- La Cuaima (2003)
- La Invasora (2003)
- ¡Qué buena se puso Lola! (2004)
- Negra Consentida (2004)
- Estrambotica Anastasia (2004)
- Mujer con pantalones (2005)
- Ser Bonita no Basta (2005)
- Amantes (telenovela) (2005)
- Amor a Palos (2005)
- Por todo lo alto (2006)
- El Desprecio (2006)
- Yo Los Declaro Marido y Mujer (2006–2007)
- Te Tengo en Salsa (2006–2007)
- Camaleona (2007)
- Mi Prima Ciela (2007)
- Toda Una Dama (2007–2008)
- La trepadora (2008)
- Nadie me diga como quererte (2008–2009)
- Calle luna, Calle sol (2009)
- Libres como el viento (2009)
- Que el cielo me explique (2010)
- La hija del panadero (2010)
- La Dama De Rosa (2010)

=== Reality ===
- Justicia Para Todos (1999–2000)
- Súper Diente por Diente (2000–2006)
- Fama y Aplausos/Fama Sudor y Lagrimas (2001–present)
- El Resuelve (2002–2006)
- Casting RCTV (2004)
- Date con Todo (2006)
- Duelo de Famosos (2006)
- Montados en la Olla (2008–present)

=== Variety ===
- Valores Humanos (1953–1967)
- El Show de las Doce (1954–1964)
- Week-End con las Estrellas (195?-19??)
- Debutantes Phillips (195?-19??)
- Lo de Hoy (1954–1983)
- El Show de Renny (1958–1959; 1961–1962; 1964–1965; 1967–1971)
- El Show de Joselo (1964-1972; 1981)
- Renny presenta... (1965–1970)
- Sabado Espectacular (1968–1970)
- Popy (1973–1986)
- Sopotocientos (1972–1974)
- Estudio 30 (1983–1984)
- Fantástico
- Cállate con Carlos Sicilia (1989–2000)
- 900 Risas (1991–2001)
- Supercrópolis (1992-1994)
- Hay que Oír a los Niños (1993–1999)
- Gente de la Mañana (199?-199?)
- La Casa de las Sorpresas (1998–1999)
- Atrevete a Soñar (1998–2003)
- Aló RCTV (1999)
- A Gozar (1995–2001)
- Emilio Punto Combo (2000-2001-2009)
- Sonoclips (1988?-1994?)
- La inimaginable imaginación (1983?-1985?)
- El show de Juan Corazón (Mid 80's)

=== Game show ===
- Concurso Millonario (19??-198?)
- Aprieta y Gana (2000–2002)
- Avízzzpate (200?-200?)
- El Precio Justo (2002-2004)
- Arranca (2005–2006)
- Al Pie de la Letra (2006–2007)

=== Documentary ===
- Expedición (1986–1998)
- Archivo Criminal (1990-1995; 1999-2002)
- Archivos del más Allá (2002-2004)
- Pantalla de Plata

== Other ==
- Hablan las Cartas (1999–2006)
- Mochileros (200?-present)
- 50 y Palante (2003)
