= La soberana =

Television series

- Title card
- Genre: Telenovela
- Created by: Xiomara Moreno
- Based on: La Regenta by Leopoldo Alas y Ureña
- Written by: Xiomara Moreno; Basilio Álvarez; José Manuel Espiño; Rossana Negrín; Javier Moreno
- Directed by: Renato Gutiérrez; Nicolás Di Blasi
- Creative director: Erasmo Colón
- Starring: Eileen Abad; Albi De Abreu; Nacho Huett
- Opening theme: "A escondidas" by Emanuel Ortega
- Country of origin: Venezuela
- Original language: Spanish
- No. of episodes: 118

Production
- Executive producer: Víctor Fernández
- Producer: Jaime Dos Reis

Original release
- Network: Radio Caracas Televisión
- Release: May 12 – October 23, 2001

Related
- Angélica pecado

La soberana is a Venezuelan drama telenovela created by Xiomara Moreno, based on the Spain novel La Regenta written by Leopoldo Alas y Ureña. It stars Eileen Abad, Albi De Abreu, and Nacho Huett. It is distributed by RCTV International and Coral Pictures. The series tells the story of Ana and Álvaro, two young people who will face the toughest adversities to fight for the immense love they have had since they were children.

== Plot ==
The Andean town of Vetusta is a hive of gossip and hypocrisy that Ana Ozores will come to know very well. Cradled in poverty despite being the daughter of the powerful Emiliano Ozores, Ana is collected by her paternal aunts, Águeda and Rosa Ozores. Although Ana is the apparent heir of the family fortune, her aunts, especially Águeda, humiliate her by reminding her of being a bastard. Ana seeks solace in a romance with Álvaro Mesías, but when he goes to study far, Ana's life with her aunts becomes intolerable. Don Víctor Quintana, Vetusta's most powerful man, asks for Ana's hand and she accepts it, happy to be able to flee her home. However, his marriage life will be a martyrdom, aggravated by the return of Álvaro; When he learns of Anna's betrayal, he vows revenge. Ana finds a way to prevent Víctor from compelling her to fulfill her conjugal duties, but still, she must remain with him. To top it all two problems arise in his life: Vetusta arrives at the seminarian Angel, an alleged stepbrother of Ana, who comes to dispute the inheritance of his father. Likewise, Chery Benavides, a woman of the world who is interested in Álvaro, also arrives.

== Cast ==
=== Main ===
- Eileen Abad as Ana Ozores
- Albi De Abreu as Álvaro Mesías
- Nacho Huett as Ángel Ozores
- Flor Núñez as Águeda Ozores
- Roberto Moll as Don Víctor Quintana
- Alicia Plaza as Rosa Ozores
- Luis Gerardo Núñez as Ramón Linares
- Marlene De Andrade as Pura Benavides de Linares
- Eliana López as Felipa Linares
- Ámbar Díaz as Teresa Mesías
- Miguel Ferrari as Benedicto
- Flor Elena González as Dulce de Mesías
- Juan Carlos Gardié as Eleazar Mesías
- Marcos Moreno as Rufino
- Jenny Noguera as Eusebia Gómez
- Joel Borges as Jaime Ríos
- Leonardo Marrero as Hermes
- Rodolfo Renwick as Doctor Dange
- Elisa Stella as Inginia Domínguez

=== Recurring ===
- Javier Paredes as López
- Gabriela Santeliz as Mirna
- Francis Romero as Señora Mijares
- Vito Lonardo as Padre Rómulo
- Gerardo Soto as El Barbero
- Hernán Mejía as Lorenzo

=== Special guest stars ===
- Daniela Bascopé as Chery Benavides
- Carlos Guillermo Haydon as Pancho Pepe Benavides
- Juliet Lima as Petra

== Production ==
The telenovela is set in Venezuela in the 1950s. The outdoor production began in February, when they moved to San Pablo del Río in Táchira state, to record the first episodes of the telenovela. There were also days in Mérida and several nearby towns of Caracas, where the architecture was lent to settle a town of time these replaced the Andean for the following chapters.
