= Los misterios del amor =

Venezuelan telenovela

- Genre: Telenovela
- Created by: Alberto Barrera Tyszka
- Written by: Alberto Barrera Tyszka; Neida Padilla; Juan Carlos Duque; Anisbely Castillo
- Directed by: Yuri Delgado
- Starring: Sabrina Seara; Juan Carlos García; Eileen Abad; Eduardo Orozco; Alba Roversi
- Opening theme: Me he enamorado by Rafael Brito
- Country of origin: Venezuela
- Original language: Spanish
- No. of episodes: 113

Production
- Executive producer: Carolina de Jacovo
- Producer: Francisco De Pasquale
- Production location: Caracas
- Cinematography: Eunice Padilla
- Editors: Carlos Jaimes; Jesus Remis; Juan Silva; Carlos Ortega
- Running time: 45 minutes
- Production company: Venevisión

Original release
- Network: Venevisión
- Release: 13 May – 8 October 2009

Related
- La vida entera; Un esposo para Estela

Los misterios del amor (English title: The mysteries of love) is a Venezuelan telenovela written by Alberto Barrera Tyszka and produced by Venevisión in 2009.

On May 13, 2008, Venevisión started broadcasting Los misterios del amor weekdays at 9:00 p.m., replacing La vida entera. The last episode was broadcast on October 8, 2009.

Sabrina Seara and Juan Carlos García star as the main protagonists, while Eileen Abad and Eduardo Orozco star as villains.

== Plot ==
Francisca Náranjo is a nurse who is hopelessly in love with Juan Andrés Róman, the director of the clinic where she works. Juan Andrés has never noticed or paid any attention to Francisca. However, through a twist of fate, Juan Andrés meets a taxi driver named Jason Martínez who looks exactly like him. Juan Andrés convinces Jason to take his place for a single afternoon so that he can obtain the opportunity to handle personal issues. It is through this exchange that Jason falls in love with Francisca the moment he sees her. Jason is completely convinced that Francisca is the love of his life.

But what seemed to be a simple game of amusement for Juan Andrés turns into a complete nightmare when he is forced to go into hiding after a series of unexpected circumstances, therefore leaving Jason to occupy his life and in a position which he cannot handle. Meanwhile, the love between Francisca and Jason continues to grow. Little does she know that the man she thinks she has finally fallen in love with isn't Juan Andrés.

== Cast ==
=== Main ===
- Sabrina Seara as Francisca Naranjo
- Juan Carlos García as Jasón Martínez/ Juan Andrés Román
- Eileen Abad as Isabella Román
- Alba Roversi as Déborah Salazar/ Francisco Gutiérrez
- Eduardo Orozco as Octavio Urbaneja
- Iván Tamayo as Emilio Pimentel

=== Supporting ===
- Mónica Pasqualotto as Maricruz Fernández de Santéliz
- Jerónimo Gil as Edwin Santéliz
- Albi De Abreu as Gabriel Acosta
- Wanda D'Isidoro as Vanessa García de Acosta
- Ana Maria Simón as Laura
- Ámbar Díaz as Zuleyma
- Rhandy Piñango as Vladimir Quintana
- Deyalit López as Amarelys
- Carmen Alicia Lara as Nayibe Martínez
- Giancarlo Pasqualotto as Daniel
- Catherine Cardozo as Lisbeth
- Flor Elena González as Diana Román
- Nattalie Cortéz as Alicia Naranjo
- Aura Rivas as Trina
- Maria Antonieta Ardila as Carlita
- Ly Jonaitis as Karolina
- Freddy Aquino as Wilfer Linares
- Hernan Iturbe as Orlando
- Sandra Yajure as Carmen
- Juan Miguel Hernández as Kabubi
- Michelle Nassef as Jimena Pimentel
- Cristhian González as Christian
- Karin Hernández as Shirley
- Samuel Egui as Kruger Martinez
- Ameliè Redondo as Sofía
- Jessika Grau as Manuela García
- Ana Karina Casanova as Mercedes
- Antonio Delli as Marcelo
- Eva Blanco as Mireya
- Yulene Iturrate as Abogada de Jasón
- Carlos Guillermo Haydon as Rodrigo Delgado
