= Por todo lo alto =

Venezuelan telenovela

- Genre: Telenovela
- Created by: Vivel Nouel
- Written by: Vivel Nouel; Carolina Mata; Manuel Mendoza; Yutzil Martínez; José Vicente Spataro
- Directed by: Otto Rodríguez
- Starring: Marianela González; Winston Vallenilla; Roxana Díaz; Jerónimo Gil
- Opening theme: "Desde que llegaste a mí" by Olga Tañón
- Country of origin: Venezuela
- Original language: Spanish
- No. of episodes: 120

Production
- Executive producer: Carlos Lamus Alcalá
- Producer: Marco Godoy
- Production location: Caracas
- Production company: RCTV

Original release
- Network: RCTV
- Release: March 2 – September 25, 2006

Related
- El Desprecio

Por todo lo alto is a Venezuelan telenovela produced by Radio Caracas Television in 2006 based on a story written by Vivel Nouel.

Marianela González and Winston Vallenilla starred as the protagonists with Jean Carlo Simancas, Roxana Díaz and Sheyene Gerardi as the villains.

== Plot ==
The San Miguel Arcángel Airport located in the Caribbean is the setting of this love story led by three airport stewards: Anabela Marcano, Morana Bastardo and Dulce María Hidalgo. These women struggle to manage their own lives and make their own way in a world dominated by men.

Anabela dreams of being a professional pilot like her late father, who died in a mysterious plane crash. While planning how to achieve his dream, pretends to settle for employment in the airline Alas del Caribe. In her desire for freedom, Anabela decides to flee her home with Humberto, a mediocre pilot who seduces her with the false promise of helping her in her Aeronautical studies.

In Anabela's plans, Rubén Alegría, who possesses the same dream as herself, has the unconditional support of his humble parents, Divina and Bienvenido, and sisters, Celia and Cruz. Everyone encourages Rubén to fulfill his dreams even though no one understands Rubén's lack of enthusiasm for popular music and much less share his strange obsession with flying, as everyone in the family suffer from vertigo.

Morana is the veteran head of the Alas del Caribe stewardesses. Ignacio has an ambition of power and is also lover of Ignacio Urquiaga, owner of the Lince airline, direct competition of the first. However, everyone is unaware that Morana is half-sister to Humberto, Anabela's boyfriend, and that she is the only person for whom Morana feels a sincere and disinterested love. In his many attempts to rid himself of his rival, Morana will use Enrique Álvarez, a competent, respected instructor pilot, who is blindly in love with her.

Dulce María, the third protagonist, also chooses to take a little traveled road by becoming an aircraft mechanic for the airline "Lince". Contrary to what her name indicates, she is a sullen, homeless-looking girl, very ungrateful, who has secretly fallen in love with Alcides Urquiaga, the son of her boss, a heartthrob heartthrob.

Alcides devotes every spare hour to his true passion, music, behind his severe father, Ignacio Urquiaga; He demands that his son fulfill the family tradition of becoming a pilot, like all men in the family, without realizing that his son has a very severe vertigo that prevents him from boarding an aircraft.

In the turbulent world of aviation, where competition and professional strife, adventure and unbridled romance reign, the three women will each drive their fate to their particular sky, using their own weapons to reach it.

== Cast ==
- Marianela González as Anabela Marcano
- Winston Vallenilla as Rubén Alegría
- Roxana Díaz as Morana Bastardo
- Jerónimo Gil as Alcides Uriquiaga
- Ámbar Díaz as Dulce María Hidalgo
- Sheyene Gerardi as Sonia
- Jean Carlo Simancas as Ignacio Uriquiaga
- Marialejandra Martín as Divina Alegría
- Daniel Alvarado as Bienvenido Alegría
- Ricardo Bianchi as Tomás Torres "Totó"
- Aileen Celeste as Victoria Bermúdez de Torres
- Sandro Finoglio as Enrique Álvarez
- Luis Gerardo Núñez as Arturo Alcántara
- Marlene Maseda as Lucía de Alcántara
- Margarita Hernández as Violeta de Uriquiaga
- Cayito Aponte as Viejo "El Carrizo"
- Gioia Lombardini as Lucía Carrizo de Cantaclaro
- Estefanía López as Cruz Alegría
- César Román as Zarataco
- Daniela Navarro as Chacha Martínez
- Sandra Martínez as Reina Patricia Hidalgo
- Carmen Alicia Lara as Celia Alegría
- Juan Carlos Martínez as Zuzú
- Eric Noriega as Tirso
- Aleska Díaz-Granados as Ifigenia
- Enrique Izquierdo as Lucho
- Liliana Meléndez as Finita
- Natalia Romero as Nereida
- Andreína Mazzeo as Martita
- Ileana Alomá as Gladys
- Luis Olavarrieta as Torcuato Pérez
- José Madonía as Rómulo
- Eduardo Orozco as Humberto Bastardo
