= Paula Woyzechowsky =

Venezuelan actress

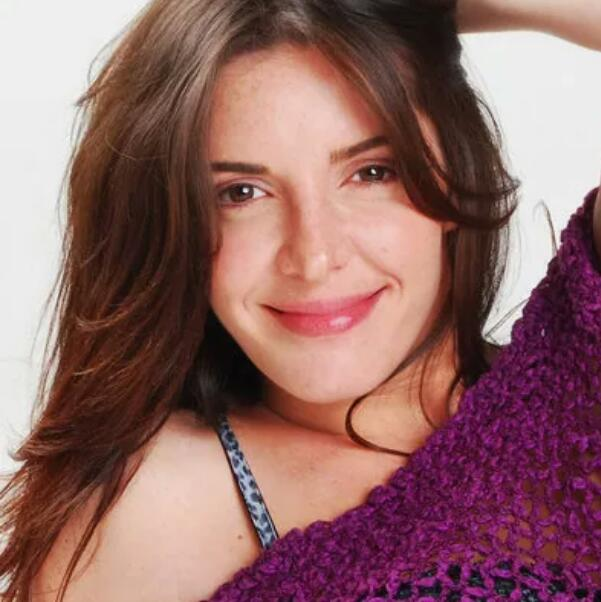
- Woyzechowsky in 2016
- Born: Paula Cristina Woyzechowsky Gutiérrez; Caracas, Venezuela
- Occupation: Actress
- Years active: 1991–present

Paula Cristina Woyzechowsky Gutiérrez is a Venezuelan actress, who debuted on 1991 on La Pandilla de los 7. She has worked on television, theater and film.

== Biography ==
Woyzechowsky was born in Caracas, Venezuela. At age 12 she debuted on the television series La Pandilla de los 7, produced by RCTV, and on 2001 she participated on the sitcom Planeta de 6, produced by Televen. Woyzechowsky has appeared on several telenovelas on Venevisión, starting on 2006 with Ciudad Bendita, followed by Arroz con leche on 2007, La vida entera on 2008, El árbol de Gabriel on 2011, and Mi ex me tiene ganas on 2012.

Woyzechowsky starred in the movies 3 Hijos y un Vestido in 2007, and Días de Poder in 2010.

On 2012 she participated in La Ratonera, a Spanish adaptation of The Mousetrap, produced by Nohely Arteaga and Catherina Cardozo.

== Telenovelas ==
Year	Title	Role
2006	Ciudad Bendita	Rosita
2007	Arroz con Leche	Yurika
2008	La vida entera	Perla
2011	El árbol de Gabriel	Gloria Falcón
2012	Mi ex me tiene ganas	Verónica Alvarado
2014	Corazón Esmeralda	Elia Magdalena Salvatierra Palacios

== Series ==
Year	Title
1991	La Pandilla de los 7
2001	Planeta de 6

== Theater ==
- La Fábula del Insomnio
- Amor Maternal
- La Más Fuerte
- El País de Caramelo
- Santa Claus en Apuros
- Usted tiene ojos de mujer fatal
- El Diario de Ana Frank
- Ely
- Intervalo
- Caja de Agua
- Instintos
- El Público
- Así Que Pasen Cinco Años
- Las Mil y Una Noches
- La Ratonera

== Film ==
- 3 Hijos y un Vestido (2007)
- Días de Poder (2010)
