= El Infierno de Gaspar Mendoza =

- Directed by: Julio Balam
- Written by: Julio Balam
- Starring: Alberto Alifa
- Cinematography: Alberto Alifa
- Production company: Villa Del Cine
- Release date: 2015
- Country: Venezuela
- Language: Spanish

El Infierno De Gaspar Mendoza is a Venezuelan movie produced by Fundación Villa. It was started by Alberto Alifa, Vicente peña, Diana Marccocia, and Luis Abreu, among others. Set fifteen years after the federal war, an elderly man tries to live in peace, but is haunted by a ghost of his past in the war. This film was the first movie of Juliao Balam.

The movie had a domestic release in 2015.

== Plot ==
The movie takes place in 1878. After the end of the Federal War, Captain Gaspar Mendoza leads a life of austerity and effort with his family in an old mansion in the interior of Venezuela. Although Gaspar has done everything possible to leave that tragedy behind, it will be his daughter, Maria Eugenia, who seems to revive it through terrible nightmares that mercilessly harass her.

== Cast ==
- Alberto Alifa
- Vicente Peña
- Diana Marcoccia
- Luis Abreu

== Reception ==
The film received mixed reviews from critics in national theaters.

== Production ==
The film was shot in several cities, such as Barquisimeto, Paracotos, Valencia, and Caracas. Actor Alberto Alifa acted as Executive producer.
