= Arroz con leche (TV series) =

- Genre: Telenovela
- Created by: Doris Seguí
- Written by: Doris Seguí; Mariana Reyes; Camilo Hernández; Carlos Eloy Castro
- Story by: Doris Seguí
- Directed by: Yuri Delgado; Sergio Martínez; Fabio Velásquez
- Starring: Eileen Abad; Marlene De Andrade; Alba Roversi; Juan Carlos García; Luis Gerónimo Abreu; Carlos Cruz; Henry Soto; Manuel Salazar; Jean Carlo Simancas; Astrid Carolina Herrera
- Opening theme: "Arroz con leche" performed by Rafael "El Pollo" Brito
- Country of origin: Venezuela
- Original language: Spanish
- No. of episodes: 155

Production
- Executive producer: Carolina De Jacobo
- Producers: Juan Carlos Farfán; Elizabeth Cermeno; Wilfredo Mast; Damaris Padilla; Ángel Ruiz
- Production locations: Caracas, Venezuela
- Cinematography: José Perez
- Editors: Carlos García; Orlando Manzo; Juan Silva

Original release
- Network: Venevisión
- Release: August 17, 2007 – March 31, 2008

Arroz con leche (English: Three Sisters) is a 2007 Venezuelan telenovela written by Doris Segui for Venevisión and distributed internationally by Venevisión International.

Eileen Abad, Marlene De Andrade, and Alba Roversi star as the main protagonists, accompanied by Juan Carlos Garcia, Luis Gerónimo Abreu, Henry Soto, and Carlos Cruz.

== Plot ==
Arroz con Leche revolves around the lives of three sisters as they try to find love in their unhappy lives. In the process, they discover that the path to discovering love is very difficult. Wenclaso is an older man left to raise his three daughters Belen, Amanda and Teresa alone after the death of their mother, Manuela. The three sisters have lived in the shadow of their deceased mother after their father still idolized Manuela even after her death.

Teresa (Alba Roversi) is an intellectual, radio presenter married to Jose Manuel "Chepo" (Manuel Salazar), a man who is unfaithful to her. Her marriage is in crisis, and she finds herself in a situation whereby she cannot use the relationship advice that she gives to her listeners to solve her own situation.

Amanda (Marlene De Andrade) is a housewife married to Thomas (Carlos Cruz), a sexist man who only thinks of himself. Frustrated by only being seen as a housewife and mother of two, she gets an opportunity of running a beauty salon in order to prove that she can also be successful in business. However, she finds true love with Rodrigo(Juan Carlos Garcia), an unhappily married man whose wife Cecilia is extremely jealous and threatens their newly found love.

Belén (Eileen Abad) is the youngest of the sisters who is left pregnant after discovering that her husband Danton (Henry Soto) is a polygamous man with three other marriages in which none of the women are aware that their husband has other wives.

== Cast ==
- Eileen Abad as Belén Pacheco de Morales
- Marlene De Andrade as Amanda Pacheco
- Alba Roversi as Teresa Pacheco
- Luis Gerónimo Abreu as Simón Herrera
- Juan Carlos García as Rodrigo
- Mónica Pasqualotto as Cecilia (Villain, turns good. Divorces Rodrigo)
- Anastasia Mazzone as Isabela (Villain, ends up in a madhouse)
- Manuel Salazar as José Manuel "Chepo"
- Alejandro Mata as Wenceslao
- Astrid Carolina Herrera as Abril
- Henry Soto as Dantón Morales (Villain. Abandons his 3 wives and escapes to Colombia)
- Carlos Cruz as Tomás (Villain. Divorces Amanda in the end)
- Ileana Jacket as Margot Ferretti (Villain. Ends up alone and poor)
- Zoe Bolívar as Mireya
- Cindy da Silva as Victoria
- Elaiza Gil as Estrella
- Milena Santander
- Jean Carlo Simancas as El Chef
- Ana María Simón es Sylvia
- Paula Woyzechowsky es Yurika
- Erika Schwarzgruber es Eugenia
