= Tomasa Tequiero =

Venezuelan telenovela

- Genre: Telenovela
- Created by: Doris Seguí
- Written by: Carlos Eloy Castro; Mariana Reyes; Anisbely Castillo; Doris Seguí
- Directed by: César Bolívar
- Starring: Gledys Ibarra; Carlos Montilla; Nohely Arteaga; Carlos Cruz
- Opening theme: La negra Tomasa by Luke Grande and Cotur
- Country of origin: Venezuela
- Original language: Spanish
- No. of episodes: 125

Production
- Executive producer: Sandra Rioboó
- Producers: Damarys Padilla; Elizabeth Cermeño; Ángel Ruiz; Ricardo Martínez; Juan Carlos Farfán
- Production locations: Caracas, Venezuela
- Editors: Carlos García; Yerson Rivas
- Camera setup: Multi-camera
- Production company: Venevisión

Original release
- Network: Venevisión
- Release: 7 October 2009 – 6 April 2010

Related
- Un Esposo para Estela; Harina de Otro Costal; Enamorándome de Ramón

Tomasa Tequiero is a Venezuelan telenovela written by Doris Seguí and produced by Venevisión between 2009 and 2010. On October 7, 2009, Venevisión began broadcasting Tomasa tequiero at 9:00 pm, replacing Un Esposo para Estela.

Gledys Ibarra stars as the main protagonist, accompanied by Carlos Montilla, Carlos Cruz, María Antonieta Duque and Emma Rabbe.

== Plot ==
For most of her adult life, Tomasa has served the Paredes family, and she has been a cheerful, good-hearted servant towards them. Her only son, Ramón, works in Colombia. Tomasa has practically raised up the two daughters of the Paredes family, Fabiana and Miguelina, as if they are her own. Tomasa is satisfied with her simple, uncomplicated life, and she couldn't wish for more. But soon, her life is going to be turned upside down due to several events. First, her son Ramón will return from Colombia to stay in Caracas. Secondly, her employers, the Paredes, are involved in an airplane accident, and she discovers that she is the sole beneficiary of their life insurance policy worth two million dollars. Tomasa will be transformed from a simple maid to a millionaire.

However, not everything will go smoothly for Tomasa, as people will begin to view her differently once they discover that she has a lot of money. Tomasa will now have to stand by her strong principles and watch over her family and protect them from the greed of others. Her life becomes even more complicated with the introduction of Severo Bustamante, a romantic love interest who is in debt and will try to get close to Tomasa in order to obtain some of her money. Severo is a relative of the Paderes, and his compulsive gambling habits have led to his unstable financial situation. Moreover, Severo will attempt to conquer Tomasa, but he is married to Virginia who is a model of a perfect housewife. Virginia will become one of Tomasa's enemies after discovering that her husband is about to leave her in order to pursue a relationship with Tomasa. Antonio, Severo's brother will also enter Tomasa's life. At first doubtful as to why the Paredes left their money to a maid, he soon discovers that family and love are what is important – especially to Tomasa. However, their potential love will be ruined by the return of Roxana, Severo's ex-wife who abandoned him and their seven-year-old son in order to run away with her lover.

== Cast ==
=== Main cast ===
- Gledys Ibarra as Tomasa Tequiero Montiel
- Carlos Montilla as Severo Bustamante
- Nohely Arteaga as Virginia de Bustamante
- Carlos Cruz as Antonio Bustamante
- Maria Antonieta Duque as Roxana
- Emma Rabbe as Emilia Ferrara

=== Also as Main ===
- Laureano Olivares as Ramón Tequiero Jaramillo Montiel
- Elaiza Gil as Margarita Paredes
- Rafael Romero as Agustín
- Daniela Navarro as Fabiana Paredes Bustamante
- Abril Schreiber as Miguelina Paredes Bustamante
- Rolando Padilla as Jorman de Jesús
- Beatriz Vásquez as Floritex Carrera
- Cesar Román as Oswaldo Bustamante
- Jose Manuel Suárez as Jorge Bustamante
- Patricia Schwarzgruber as Sofía Arango
- Alejandro Mata as Don Pedro

=== Supporting cast ===
- Loly Sánchez as Martirio Paredes
- Carmen Julia Álvarez as Pascualina
- Roberto Lamarca as Perucho
- Fernándo Villate as Cariaquito
- Adriana Romero as Blondinet
- Jose Luis Useche as Perfecto
- Sindy Lazo as Susana
- Rosmel Bustamante as Francisco "Chicho" Bustamante
- Claudio De La Torre as Francisco Hurtado
- Pedro Pablo Porras as Rudelio
- Marco Antonio Alcalá as Bobby Jabón
- Vanessa Di Quattro as Darling Guadalupe
- Janset Rojas as Verónica
- Susy Herrera as Sara
- Virginia Lancaster as Yamilca
- Sonia Villamizar as Katiuska Bustamante de Paredes
- Henry Soto as Rómulo Paredes
- Ligia Duarte as Greta
- Rodolfo Drago as Marlon
- Moisés Berroterán as Exenobel
- Rhandy Piñango as Augusto
