= Llovizna (TV series) =

Venezuelan television program

- Genre: Telenovela; Romance; Drama
- Created by: José Simón Escalona
- Written by: Johnny Gavloski; Marianella Yánez; Rossana Negrín; María Helena Portas; Iris D. Dubs
- Directed by: José Alcalde
- Starring: Scarlet Ortiz; Luis Fernández; Caridad Canelón; Javier Vidal; Pablo Martín
- Opening theme: Solamente Fuego by Samuel
- Country of origin: Venezuela
- Original language: Spanish
- No. of episodes: 145

Production
- Executive producer: Victor Fernández
- Running time: 45 minutes
- Production company: RCTV

Original release
- Network: RCTV
- Release: March 25, 1997 – February 10, 1998

Llovizna is a Venezuelan telenovela produced by RCTV in 1997 based on a story written by José Simón Escalona.

Scarlet Ortiz and Luis Fernández starred as the main protagonists.

== Plot ==
Llovizna is the name of a beautiful eighteen-year-old girl raised by Marhuanta Sánchez, a former prostitute and companion of Llovizna's grandfather, Caruachi del Río. Caruachi, an ex-convict and now a steel worker, gave baby Llovizna to Marhuanta, without revealing that she was his granddaughter. Llovizna's biological mother, Caruachi's daughter, Rosplandor, was murdered immediately following her birth in an effort to hide a relationship she had with Pio Heres, the owner of the steel mill. As Pio was hoping for a son, Llovizna's life was spared, and she was given to Marhuanta to raise as her own child. On his deathbed, Caruachi reveals to Llovizna that Pio robbed him of his investment in the steel mill 20 years prior, and that Pio is responsible for the death of her mother. As he breathes his last breath, he begs Llovizna, as his sole heir, to recover her share of the steel mill that was taken away from him years ago, before Pio had him unjustly imprisoned for the death of Llovizna's mother. Caruachi's tragic accident in one of the furnaces at the steel mill, compels Llovizna to seek his job, in order to keep the promise she made to her dying grandfather, to expose Pio Heres for all of his wrongdoing. Here, Llovizna will fall hopelessly in love with Orinoco Fuego, a handsome, young and rebellious steel worker. Jesus Ferrer, many years ago, left his humble family, and ambitiously studied under the tutelage of Pio Heres, who had many years awaited the birth of a son. Jesus changed his name from Caroni Fuego and left behind his mother and younger brother, Orinoco. Fate and circumstances will force Llovizna to set her feelings for Orinoco aside, when she leaves the furnaces and accepts a job with the new general manager of the steel empire, Mr. Jesus Ferrer. Here Llovizna begins to unravel the lies that the now seriously ill Pio has used to cover the death of her mother and the robbery of her grandfather's rights in the steel mill. When Pio is exposed for his crimes and threatens Orinoco's life, Llovizna, in an attempt to save her true love, marries Jesus.

Llovizna is the name of the story of youth who want to better themselves and the struggle to achieve their goals and lives. It is a story where honest work, education, solidarity and friendship are the moving forces that frame all of the characters. It is the impulse of such a powerful love that makes their conquest possible.

== Cast ==
- Caridad Canelón as Marhuanta Sánchez
- Scarlet Ortiz as Yolanda Llovizna Sanchez
- Luis Fernández as Orinoco Fuego
- Javier Vidal as Pío Heres Briceño
- Elisa Escámez as Nieves Fuego
- Mildred Quiroz as Diamante Falcón Heres
- Pablo Martín as Jesus Ferer
- Yoletty Cabrera as Soledad Barrancos
- Juan Carlos Baena as Luis Luis
- Erika Medina as Siria Degredo
- José Ángel Urdaneta as Patrio Morales
- Catherine Correia as Salvaje Callao
- Alberto Alcala as Manteco
- Jenny Quintas as Babilonia Degredo
- Alfonso Medina as Lanzarote Niño
- Natalia Capelletti as Concordia
- Henry Castañeda as Guasipati
- Roberto Messutti as Eloy
- Nacarid Escalona as Alejandra de Hipolito
- Winston Vallenilla as Jose Miguel Andueza
- Tatiana Capote as Almaneser
