= Sheyene Gerardi =

Venezuelan and Italian actress and producer

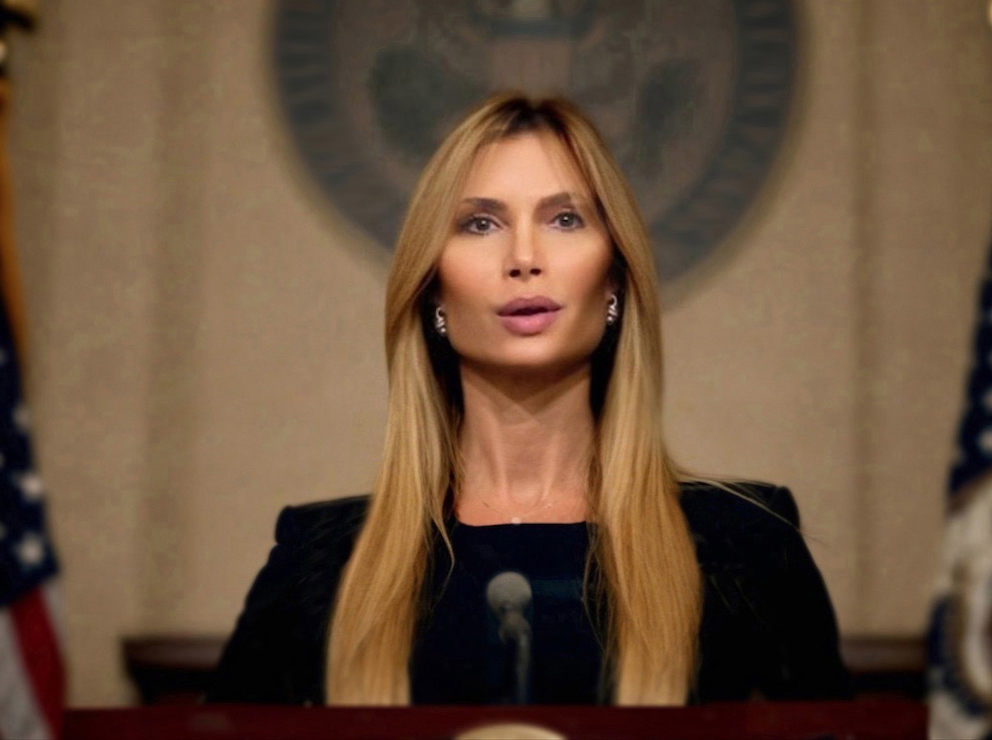
- Born: April 13; Caracas, Venezuela
- Occupation: Former actress
- Years active: 1998–present
- Height: 5 ft 6 in (168 cm)
- Board member of: International Political Science Association and the committee on professional ethics, rights, and freedoms; American Society of International Law
- Partner: Single
- Children: None
- Family: Both parents killed in a car Accident. No living relatives
- Awards: Meridiano de Oro (1 award); 2 de Oro (2 awards); Imagen Awards (1 award)
- Website: sheyenegerardi.net

Sheyene Gerardi (born April 13) is an Italo-Venezuelan former actress, producer, and media proprietor.

== Early life and family ==
Sheyene Gerardi was born in Venezuela, she holds dual-citizenship from her mother's home country of Italy.

== Entertainment career ==
Her career as a professional model began in conjunction with her medical education; prior to attending university she represented her school in mathematics and chemistry competitions. Gerardi studied medicine at the Universidad Central de Venezuela. She worked as a model part time and participated in the Miss Venezuela pageant. During her time at the university, a TV producer discovered Gerardi, and she won a starring role on a popular soap opera series that was broadcast internationally. Gerardi has worked in more than 30 countries, including Russia, Germany, Peru, Ecuador, Colombia, and Puerto Rico. A non-profit charity foundation in Barlovento, Venezuela, the Sheyene School, is named after her.

Gerardi has won the 2 de Oro award, the Meridiano de Oro award and the Imagen Awards, and was given the key to the city of Barlovento.

== Business career ==
Later in her career, Gerardi founded the Sheyene Gerardi Network (SGN), a platform for entertainment content raising awareness of the space revolution. On March 9, 2020, Gerardi began hosting a cable television show entitled To the Moon and Back with Sheyene Gerardi, in which she presents cutting-edge technological developments. She also served as executive producer for the series.

In 2017, Gerardi established a robotics company, Sheyene Technology, to commercialize her robotics product lines of autonomous mining vehicles and self-driving cars for industrial and commercial uses. It also has product research and development operations in Connected and Autonomous Vehicles (CAV) and for deployment on in situ planetary and lunar missions. The company is headquartered in Silicon Valley, California, with offices in Shanghai and Barcelona, and its clients include government agencies in the United States. Sheyene Technology is a wholly-owned subsidiary of the Sheyene Gerardi Family Office.

== Academia ==
In April 2020, Gerardi enrolled in a degree in political science at the University of Naples Federico II. She is a member of the International Political Science Association (IPSA) and its committee on professional ethics, rights, and freedoms. She is also a member of the American Society of International Law.

Gerardi was formerly a member of L'association française de science politique (AFSP), and the Women's International League for Peace and Freedom.

== Personal life ==
In 2006, Gerardi's mother and father were killed in an automobile accident, leaving her with no living family. A year later, she was diagnosed with advanced lymphoma stage IV, a very rare type of cancer with only 60 cases reported worldwide with no survivors. The cancer spread throughout 85% of her body and doctors gave her three months to live. During her chemotherapy treatments, Gerardi worked in two films in Mexico, including La virgen de la caridad del cobre. Six months later, in Santa Juanita de Los Lagos, Gerardi began three years of chemotherapy, during which she suffered no hair loss.

Gerardi grew up as an avid fan of racing; her father, Edgar García, was a renowned explorer and a racing car driver in Venezuela. In 1974, García led an expedition to Mount Roraima, resulting in the discovery of 11 new scorpion species, one of which, Neochactas garciai, was named in his honor for his contribution to the understanding of scorpion species. Gerardi is a certified yacht captain and owns a yacht named after her in Florida.

== Filmography ==
Year	Title	Role
1998	Hoy te vi	Perla
1998	Niña mimada	La Araña
2003–2004	La Invasora	Yoly
2004–2005	Mujer con pantalones	Guillermina Peréz
2006–2007	Por todo lo alto	Sonia
2007–2008	Camaleona	Susana Rincón
2008–2009	La virgen de la caridad del cobre	Martha
2010–2011	Santa Juanita de los lagos	
2012–2013	Esta noche tu night	Host
2013–2014	Los Implicados	Host
2014–2015	A tacon quitao	Host
2017–2018	Noticiero Telemundo	Anchor
2020	To the moon and back with Sheyene Gerardi	Host/ Executive Producer
