= Dad Dáger =

Venezuelan actress

- Born: Dad Cristina Dáger Pieri; August 12, 1967 (age 58); Caracas, Distrito Capital, Venezuela
- Occupation: Actress
- Years active: 1992−present
- Children: Mathías Ribalta Dáger

Dad Dáger (born August 12, 1967, Caracas, Distrito Capital, Venezuela) is a Venezuelan actress. She is known for her roles in telenovelas of Telemundo and RCTV.

== Filmography ==
=== Television ===
Year	Title	Role
1992	Por estas calles	Maestra Andrade
1993	De Oro Puro	Rovenna
1994	Pura sangre	Aurita Guillén
1995	Ilusiones	Rosa Córdoba
1996	La inolvidable	Azucena
1998	Reina de corazones	Catalina Monsalve
1999	Mujer secreta	Cecilia Valladares
2000	Mis 3 hermanas	Silvia Estrada Morandi
2001	Viva la Pepa	Yakionassi Guaramato
2002	Trapos íntimos	Manuela Andueza / Soledad Andueza de Lobo
2004	Estrambotica Anastasia	Violeta
2005	Amantes	Leonor Rivera
2007	Camaleona	Claudia Ferrari de Luzardo / Octavia Ferrari
2008	Isa TKM	Estela Ruiz
2009	Libres como el viento	Ivanna Galván
2012	Relaciones peligrosas	Clementina de Maximo
2013	Marido en alquiler	Paloma Ramos
2014–2015	Tierra de reyes	Miranda Luján Saldívar
2017	La Fan	Patricia
2017	Sangre de mi tierra	Susan

=== Cinema ===
Movie	Director	Role	Year
Desautorizado	Elia K Scheneider	Raquel	2010
Fray Martin De Porras	Raimundo Calixto	Juanna de porres	2007

== Personal life ==
Dad Dáger has a son, who was born in 2010.
