= Gledys Ibarra =

Venezuelan television actress (born 1960)

- Born: Gledys Coromoto Ibarra Ramírez; November 19, 1960 (age 65); Maturín, Monagas, Venezuela
- Occupation: Actress
- Years active: 1985–present
- Spouse: Martin Smith (m. 2014)

Gledys Ibarra (born November 19, 1960) is a Venezuelan television actress.

== Filmography ==
=== Films ===
Year	Title	Role	Notes
1986	Asesino nocturno		Film debut
1986	Seguro está el infierno		
1994	Santera	Belén	
1995	Sicario, la ley de la calle	Carlota	
1996	La nave de los sueños		
2007	13 segundos	Mamá de María	
2010	Taita Boves	María Trinidad	
2015	The Path of the Sun	Europa	

=== Television ===
Year	Title	Role	Notes
1985	Cristal	Tomasa	Television debut
1987	La intrusa	Belinda	
1987	La pasión de Teresa		
1988	Selva María		
1988	La Muchacha del circo		
1988	Abigail		
1989	Pobre negro	Encarnación	
1990	Gardenia		
1992	Por estas calles	Eloina Rangel	
1995	Amores de fin de siglo	Luna Camacho	
1996	Volver a vivir	Carmen Teresa	
1998	Aunque me cueste la vida	Tía Porcia	
1999	Mujer secreta	Micaela Rojas	
2000	Hay amores que matan	Aleluya Sotomayor	
2000	Angélica pecado		
2003	La mujer de Judas	Marina Batista	
2003	Cosita rica	Patria Mía	
2005	El amor las vuelve locas		
2006	Ciudad Bendita	Mercedes Zuleta "La Diabla"	
2008	La sucursal del cielo	Eufrosina Mena	
2008	La vida entera	Pasión Guerra	
2009	Tomasa Tequiero	Tomasa Tequiero Montiel	Lead role
2011	La Bruja	La Negra	24 episodes
2013	Rosario	Antonia	
2013	Grachi	Mirna	21 episodes
2013	Santa Diabla	Elisa Lozano	
2015	Piel salvaje	Madre Isabel	
