= Crisol Carabal =

Venezuelan actress

- Born: Crisol Celeste Caraballo Carreño; January 11, 1969 (age 57); Caracas, Venezuela
- Other name: Crisol Carabal
- Occupation: Actress
- Years active: 1988-present
- Spouse: Alessandro Nerilli (2007-present)
- Parent: Alejandro Caraballo

Crisol Celeste Caraballo Carreño best known as Crisol Carabal (born 11 January 1969) is a Venezuelan television and theater actress known for her roles in telenovelas.

== Career ==
Crisol began her artistic career through reciting poems on a television show called Cuánto Vale el Show transmitted by RCTV, and started her acting career by obtaining small roles in RCTV telenovelas. She was trained in acting by actress Amalia Pérez Díaz and through this, she obtained her first acting role in the telenovela Abigail where she played the role of Charito, the best friend of the titular character played by Catherine Fulop. The telenovela became a major hit that year and was transmitted in various countries around the world.

In 1995, she obtained her first starring role in the telenovela Ilusiones alongside Vicente Tepedino.

In 2006, she played the villain in Venevisión's telenovela Los Querendones where she played the cold hearted OB/GYN Dr. Gloria Millares. She recorded several telenovelas with Venevisión in the following years namely Aunque mal paguen and La vida entera. She then relocated to Canary Islands, Spain with her husband, magician Mago Sandro.

In 2012, Crisol returned to Venezuela to participate in the telenovela Mi ex me tiene ganas to play the villain Amanda Atenas.

== Personal life ==
Her father is the poet Alejandro Caraballo. Since 2007 she is married to Alessandro Nerilli a magician. In 1997, Crisol was diagnosed with a brain tumor and underwent surgery which was successfully removed.

== Telenovelas ==
- 1988: Selva María as Daniela
- 1988: Abigail as Charito
- 1992: Por Estas Calles as Bettysabel
- 1993: Dulce Ilusión as Sarita
- 1994: Pura Sangre as Yomira Sarmiento
- 1995: Ilusiones as Marisol Palacios
- 1997: Maria de los Angeles as Alba Griselda Basanta Vargas
- 1998: Luisa Fernanda (telenovela) as Miriam Linares
- 2000: Mariú as Amanda Galvez Escorza
- 2000: Angelica pecado as Veronica
- 2002: Mambo y canela as Lolita
- 2003: Trapos íntimos as Angela Chacón
- 2004: Estrambotica Anastasia as Gregoria Borosfky
- 2005: Ser Bonita No Basta as Michelle
- 2006: Los Querendones as Gloria Millares
- 2007: Aunque mal paguen as Malinka
- 2008: La vida entera as Titina San Juan
- 2012: Mi ex me tiene ganas as Amanda Atenas

== Films ==
- 2003: La señora de Cárdenas as Angélica

== Theater ==
- 2004: Confesiones de Mujeres de 30
- 2009: ¿Estás ahí?
