= Aunque me Cueste la Vida =

- Genre: Telenovela; Romance; Drama
- Created by: Salvador Garmendia; Martín Hahn
- Written by: Salvador Garmendia; Martín Hahn; Annie Van Der Dys; Valentina Saa
- Directed by: Olegario Barrera
- Starring: Carlos Montilla; Roxana Diaz; Franklin Virgüez; Gledys Ibarra; Julie Restifo; Carlota Sosa
- Opening theme: Como un hechizo by Carlos Montilla
- Country of origin: Venezuela
- Original language: Spanish
- No. of episodes: 126

Production
- Executive producer: Leonor Sardi Aguilera
- Producer: Armando Reverón Borges
- Production location: Caracas
- Production company: RCTV

Original release
- Network: RCTV
- Release: July 22, 1998 – February 9, 1999

Related
- Niña mimada

Aunque me cueste la vida (English title:Though It Might Cost Me My Life) is a Venezuelan telenovela written by Salvador Garmendia and Martín Hahn and produced by Radio Caracas Televisión in 1998. This telenovela ran for 126 episodes and was distributed internationally by RCTV International.

Roxana Diaz and Carlos Montilla star as the main protagonists with Julie Restifo, Franklin Virgüez and Catherine Correia as the antagonists.

== Synopsis ==
On the day of the Festival Of The Moon, a gypsy predicts that the soulful heiress Teresa Larrazabal will meet three men. The mystical ”spell of the stardust” will unmask one who will help her, one who will destroy her and one who will be the love of her life. But the spell undergoes a sinister twist at the hands of the embittered Belgica Michelena. She casts a terrible sentence on the innocence of true love, hurling Teresa toward an unwilling fate as her pawn in a mysterious game of seduction, sorcery and revenge.

Belgica unites a powerful hatred for Teresa’s father Teofilo, the lover who spurned her, with the power of the gypsy’s incantation. But her plan to use sons, Vicente and Pedro Armando, as instruments of her vengeance goes awry when Vicente falls in love with Teresa, challenging both his mother and the supernatural forces that oppose them. It is decreed that Vicente will die if Teresa surrenders to his love. Defiant in their quest to resist Belgica’s depravity, Teresa and Vicente join hands and hearts to undo the evil of the prophecy.

As they travel through the Magic Forest, the characters follow the path toward the secret that could free them. Their journey brings them into conflict with the forces shaping their fate, as they seek to overcome the obstacles preventing them from reaching their goal.

== Cast ==
- Carlos Montilla as Vicente Valbuena Michelena
- Roxana Diaz as Teresa Larrazábal
- Franklin Vírgüez as Don Teófilo Larrazába
- Gledys Ibarra as Porcia Larrazába
- Julie Restifo as Belgica Michelena
- Carlota Sosa as Blanca
- Catherine Correia as Julia Larrazába
- Winston Vallenilla as Pedro Armando Reverón
- Juan Carlos Alarcón as Modesto
- Ricardo Bianchi as Edmundo Berrisveitia
- Nacarid Escalona as Elida
- Alfonso Medina as Polonio
- Dalila Colombo as Martirio Larrazabal

== Trivia ==
- The theme song to Aunque me Cueste la Vida is "Como un Hechizo", performed by Carlos Montilla.
- Belgica Michelena was the basis for Tatum O'Neal's character in the MyNetworkTV serial Wicked Wicked Games.
- Same song title written by Alberto "Negrito Del Batey" Beltran, of the Dominican Republic, in the 60s.
