= Trapos íntimos =

Television series

- Genre: Telenovela; Romance
- Created by: Valentina Párraga
- Written by: Valentina Párraga; Manuel Mendoza; Neida Padilla; José Vicente Quintana; Ana Carolina López; César Rojas
- Directed by: Luis Manzo
- Starring: Marlene De Andrade; Carlos Montilla; Gabriela Vergara; Alfonso Medina
- Opening theme: "Cha Cha muchacha" by Rubén Rada
- Country of origin: Venezuela
- Original language: Spanish
- No. of episodes: 160

Production
- Executive producer: Carmen Cecilia Urbaneja
- Producer: José Gerardo Guillén
- Production location: Caracas
- Production company: RCTV

Original release
- Network: RCTV
- Release: 3 October 2002 – 20 August 2003

Related
- Juana la virgen; Amorcito corazón (2011)

Trapos íntimos (English title:Designs of Love) is a Venezuelan telenovela written by Valentina Párraga and produced by Radio Caracas Television in 2002.

Marlene De Andrade, Carlos Montilla, Gabriela Vergara and Alfonso Medina starred as the protagonists with Dad Dáger as the antagonist.

In 2011, Televisa produced a remake of Trapos íntimos titled Amorcito corazón.

== Plot ==
Fernando Lobo is a young widower with a strong character who thinks that no one can replace his late wife Soledad Andueza. As a father of three daughters, he decides to move to Caracas. On the other hand, Isabel Cordero is a beautiful and willful interior designer, who works as an art teacher. On the eve of sleeping with her boyfriend for the first time, fear grips her, and the experience becomes a disaster that marks her life. Fernando begins a new life as General Manager of a well-known brand "Caricia",

unsociable and strong character, who thinks that no one can replace his late wife, . Father of three daughters, Fernando decides to move to Caracas . For her part, He has a boyfriend, but on the eve of sleeping with him for the first time, fear grips her and experience becomes a disaster that will leave her marked for life.

After closing his cycle as oil manager, Fernando begins a new life as General Manager of the well-known brand "Caricia", an underwear factory owned by his mother-in-law, the autocratic Federica de Andueza. Fernando hates changing from working in the oil industry to working in the feminine world.

== Cast ==
- Marlene De Andrade as Isabel Cecilia Cordero
- Carlos Montilla as Fernando Lobo Santacruz
- Gabriela Vergara as Lucía Lobo Santacruz
- Alfonso Medina as William Guillermo Pinzón "Willy"
- Dad Dáger as Manuela Federica Andueza / Soledad Andueza de Lobo
- Flavia Gleske as Zoe Guerrero
- Amanda Gutiérrez as Federica Ruíz Vda. de Andueza
- Alicia Plaza as Beba Solís
- Leonardo Marrero as Jorge Luis Solís
- Iván Tamayo as Felipe Ferrer
- Saúl Marín as Cecilio Monsalve
- Juan Carlos Gardié as Elmer Rosas Rojas
- Nacarid Escalona as Doris Day Montiel
- Rosario Prieto as Eulalia Pinzón
- Francis Rueda as Carmen Teresa Cordero
- Carlos Guillermo Haydon as Mauricio Rossi
- Eduardo Orozco as Juan "Juancho" Febres
- Marisa Román as María Soledad "Marisol" Lobo Andueza
- Yelena Maciel as María de Lourdes "Mariló" Lobo Andueza
- Maria Gabriela de Faría as María Fernanda "Marifer" Lobo Andueza
- Gabriel López as Gabriel Pérez "Tuqueque"
- Ivette Domínguez as Guillermina Azuaje
- Alejandro Mata as Gumersindo Cordero
- Araceli Prieto as Sor Ernestina González
- Émerson Rondón as Ramón "Moncho" Pérez
- Gerardo Soto as Nicolás "Nico" Santacruz
- Jesús Cervó as Pancho Ruíz
- Lady Dayana Núñez as Bárbara Eulalia "Barbarita" Pinzón
- Noel Carmona as Álvaro Mejías Parissi
- Crisol Carabal as Ángela Chacón
- Yugui López as El Goajiro
- Nacho Huett as Ricardo "Ricky" Pinzón
- José Luis Zuleta as Inspector Idrogo
- Aura Rivas as Elia Morón Figuera
