= Mujer con pantalones =

Television series

- Genre: Telenovela
- Created by: Julio César Mármol
- Written by: Julio César Mármol jr. Ana Teresa Sosa; Carmen García Vilar; César Rojas; Raúl Valladares
- Directed by: Tony Rodríguez
- Starring: Marlene De Andrade; Mark Tacher; Winston Vallenilla; Alfonso Medina
- Opening theme: "Mujer encantadora" by Simón Gómez
- Country of origin: Venezuela
- Original language: Spanish
- No. of episodes: 221

Production
- Executive producer: Marco Godoy Ramírez
- Producer: Carlos Lamus Alcalá
- Production location: Caracas
- Production company: RCTV

Original release
- Network: RCTV
- Release: November 14, 2004 – August 10, 2005

Mujer con pantalones is a Venezuelan telenovela created by Julio César Mármol and produced by Radio Caracas Television in 2004.

Marlene De Andrade and Mark Tacher starred as the protagonists with Winston Vallenilla and Alfonso Medina as co-protagonists and Eduardo Orozco as the antagonist.

== Plot ==
María Isabel Torrealba "Micel" begins secretly working in her father's factory for two weeks, and she begins an affair with Juan José, her supervisor who doesn't know she is a Torrealba. Using a fake name, María Isabel begins investigating her older brother Vladimir who she suspects of extorting the peasants in the area. María also meets Salvador Diego Vega, her childhood friend whose father was a partner in the factory. Micel will have to navigate a world dominated by men up to the point of her willingness to sacrifice her feelings to achieve her goals so that she becomes "the woman wearing the pants".

== Cast ==
- Marlene De Andrade as María Isabel Torrealba / "Micel"
- Mark Tacher as Salvador Diego Vega Andonegui
- Winston Vallenilla as Juan José Rondón
- Alfonso Medina as Neptalí Moreno Michel
- Sheyene Gerardi as Guillermina Pérez
- Daniel Alvarado as Pedro Pablo Torrealba
- Julie Restifo as Cristina Galué de Torrealba
- Wanda D'Isidoro as Leticia Hewson
- Eduardo Orozco as Vladimir Torrealba Galué
- Jalymar Salomón as Paulina Torrealba Galué
- Flor Elena González as Candelaria de Lisboa
- Margarita Hernández as Teresa "Teresita" Galué
- Aura Rivas as María Benita Guerra
- Javier Valcárcel as José Gregorio "Goyo" Lisboa
- Yajaira Orta as Doña Dulia Andonegui
- Mirtha Pérez as Tibaide Rondón
- Estefanía López as Fernanda Rondón
- Aileen Celeste as Esther Paulini
- Paula Bevilacqua as Amaranta Torrealba Galué
- Oscar Cabrera as Alfredito Lisboa
- Cristal Avilera as Clementina
- Crisbel Henríquez as Eliana Contreras
- Andreína Álvarez as Linda Bombón
- Marcos Campos as Evaristo Lisboa
- Jeanette Flores as Camila "Camilita" Briceño
- José Ángel Ávila as José María Estupiñán
- César Bencid as Toribio Bertoloto
- Simón Gómez as Gerardo Enrique Rondón
- Andreína Mazzeo as Coromoto Olivares
- Christian Chividatte as Eusebio Montiel
- María Gabriela Maldonado as Daniela Romero (niña)
- Carlos Arreaza as Armando López
- Deyalit López as Lorena
