= Carlos Montilla =

Venezuelan television and theater actor (born 1962)

- Born: Carlos Gregorio Montilla Sánchez; 21 August 1962 (age 64); Caracas, Venezuela
- Occupations: Actor, musician
- Website: www.carlosmontilla.net

Carlos Montilla (born 21 August 1962) is a Venezuelan television and theater actor known for his roles in various telenovelas and theater productions.

== Biography ==
He was born to Reina Isabel and Teófilo and is the second of three brothers.

Carlos began his academic studies in the United States after obtaining an academic scholarship to study at the Pacific Lutheran University in Washington. While there, he enrolled in an acting class and developed an interest in acting. He returned to Venezuela to enroll in drama school. During this time, he attended various acting workshops with renowned actors where his interest in acting grew.

Montilla is also a singer with his first album titled De ahora en adelante. The first single from the album, "Loba Herida", was the main theme of the telenovela La loba herida in which he had a starring role. The album was certified gold in Spain.

== Telenovelas ==
- Topacio (1984) as Rafaelote
- Alma mía (1988) as Luis Gustavo
- Primavera (1988) as Salvador
- Rubí rebelde (1989) as Diego
- Carmen Querida (1990) as Arturo
- La loba herida (1992) as Macuto Algarbe
- Sirena (1993) as Adonis Diniz
- Aunque me Cueste la Vida (1998) as Vicente
- Mariú (2000) as Emiliano Galvez Escorza
- Carissima (2001) as Gabriel Santuario
- Trapos íntimos (2002) as Fernando Lobo Santacruz
- El amor las vuelve locas (2005) as Pablo Martinez
- Ciudad Bendita (2006) as Darwin Manuel
- La vida entera (2008) as Cristóbal Duque
- Tomasa Tequiero (2009) as Severo Bustamante
- El Fantasma de Elena (2010) as Darío Girón
- Mi ex me tiene ganas (2012) as Kevin Miller

== Films ==
- La Magica Aventura de Oscar (2000)
- The Boatman (2015) as Norberto
- Spark (2016)
- Samland (2022) as JJ

== TV SERIES ==
- The Sentinel ( 1 episode)
- Jane The virgen ( 2016)

== Discography ==
- De ahora en adelante (1992)
