= Eduardo Orozco =

Venezuelan actor

- Born: Eduardo Alonso Orozco León; March 12, 1980 (age 46); Caracas, Venezuela
- Occupation: Actor

Eduardo Alonso Orozco León (born 3 March 1980) is a Venezuelan actor known for his participation in telenovelas for RCTV, and most recently Venevisión. He was born in Caracas to father Eduardo Orozco who worked as a journalist and mother Coromoto Alonso.

He began his acting career at the age of seven by participating in several commercials.

== Filmography ==
=== Film ===
Year	Title	Role
2007	La hija de Juana Crespo	Unknown role
2011	El tren del no olvido	Juan Carlos
2015	Hasta que la muerte nos separe	Mike Moose

=== Television ===
Year	Title	Role	Notes
2001	A calzón quita'o	El Chami Novio	
2002	Trapos íntimos	Juancho Febres	
2002	Hoy	Himself	Television host
2003	La Invasora	Enrique Cárdenas	
2005	Mujer con pantalones	Vladimir Torrealba Galué	
2006	Por todo lo alto	Humberto Luzardo	
2006	Te tengo en salsa	César Román Perroni Montiel	
2008	Torrente	Juan "Juancho" Gabaldón Leal	
2009	Los misterios del amor	Octavio	
2010	La mujer perfecta	Larry Corona	137 episodes
2012	Válgame Dios	Ignacio "Nacho" Castillo	
2013–14	Santa Diabla	Arturo Santana	110 episodes
2015	Escándalos	Aureliano Mendoza / Ángelo	2 episodes
2018	Mi familia perfecta	Felipe	2 episodes
2025	Velvet: El nuevo imperio	Víctor	Recurring role

== Theater ==
- Soltero, Casado, Viudo y Divorciado (2010)
- Hercules (2008)
- Alicia en el País de las maravillas (1987)
