= María de los ángeles =

Television series

- Genre: Telenovela; Romance; Drama
- Created by: Julio César Mármol
- Directed by: Olegario Barrera; Otto Rodríguez
- Starring: Lilibeth Morillo; Marcelo Cezán; Alba Roversi; Franklin Virgüez
- Opening theme: Inmenso by Felix Valentino
- Ending theme: Inmenso by Felix Valentino
- Country of origin: Venezuela
- Original language: Spanish
- No. of episodes: 113

Production
- Executive producer: Jhony Pulido Mora
- Producer: Hernando Faría
- Production location: San Sebastián

Original release
- Network: RCTV
- Release: April 1 – August 9, 1997

Related
- Los amores de Anita Peña

María de los Ángeles is a Venezuelan telenovela written by Julio César Mármol and produced by RCTV in 1997. The telenovela lasted for 113 episodes and was distributed internationally by RCTV International.

Lilibeth Morillo and Marcelo Cezán starred as the main protagonists with Alba Roversi, Vicente Tepedino and Alba Roversi as the main antagonists.

== Plot ==
Set in the Venezuelan countryside, the story begins with a pact of love between 2 children: Orquídea and Radamés who swear eternal love for each other to the Virgin Mary. As they grow older, their love becomes stronger. But their destinies change forever when Orquídea's powerful step-father Don Teófilo Córdoba plans to marry her off to Vladimir Arévalo, a rich, older businessman with a son from a previous marriage. Orquídea is disgusted with the idea and plans to run off with Radamés, a humble worker at her step-father's hacienda. However, they are caught, and as a means of breaking up their relationship forever, the cruel Teófilo forces Radamés to become a witness at Orquídea's wedding, leading her to believe that he betrayed her. After the wedding celebration, Orquídea plans to run away but is locked up by Bernardo, Teófilo's trusted servant, and her new husband abuses her. Filled with rage, Orquídea swears revenge. One night, by bribing Bernardo, she locates her step-father at his lover's hut and sets fire to it, and Teófilo dies from smoke inhalation. Next, Orquídea proceeds to get revenge on Radamés by having him captured and using an ax, cuts off the hand he used to sign her marriage certificate as a witness. She then orders him to leave the hacienda.

Meanwhile, Héctor Córdoba, Orquídea's older step-brother and Teófilo's heir, is having a secret affair with the humble Rosalinda Vargas, the daughter of a fisherman. With Rosalinda expecting a child, Héctor informs Vladimir about his plans to marry her. But just before the birth of his daughter and after discovering that Orquídea planned the death of his father, he dies in a car accident. Distressed, Rosalinda goes to the hacienda and meets Orquídea who realises that her child will be the sole heir of the whole property, thereby impending her plans. She cruelly chases Rosalinda out of the hacienda and orders her goons to go after her in the forest to kill her and her child. Luckily, Rosalinda meets a Dominican priest who helps her give birth to a girl whom he baptises María de los Ángeles. In order to protect the child, Rosalinda takes María to a nearby convent in order to protect her. She then moves to another town to hide her sad and dark past where she meets and marries Radamés. Orquídea also gives birth to a baby girl, Andrea, the product of her marital rape.

María grows up in the convent raised up by the nuns, but she always questioned her origins and decides to look for her parents. She meets Jorge De la Rosa, a young peasant raised by Indians in the forest and falls in love with him. Orquídea who has now become one of the most powerful women in the region, discovers that María de los Ángeles is her niece, and decides to use her spoilt step-son Rodrigo to seduce her and marry her in order to have rightful claim to the Córdoba fortune. She becomes infuriated when she discovers Radamés, the only man she has ever loved, is married to Rosalinda, and decides to make her and her daughter suffer. After framing her for a crime she didn't commit and having her sold as a sex slave, María is presumed to be dead. However, she appears years later, transformed and powerful, to punish her cruel Aunt Orquídea and claim her rightful fortune.

== Cast ==
- Lilibeth Morillo as María de los Ángeles Córdoba Vargas
- Marcelo Cezán as Jorge De la Rosa / Jorge Basanta Salazar
- Alba Roversi as Orquídea Córdoba Escalante
- Franklin Virgüez as Radamés Basanta
- Flor Núñez as Rosalinda Vargas de Basanta
- Crisol Carabal as Alba Griselda Basanta Vargas
- Vicente Tepedino as Rodrigo Arévalo
- Martín Lantigua as Don Teófilio Córdoba
- Ricardo Álamo as Rogelio Vargas
- Loly Sánchez as Francisca Salazar
- Alberto Rowinsky as Vladimir Arévalo
- Tomás Henríquez as Bernardo Perales
- Carlos Cruz as Héctor Córdoba Escalante
- Verónica Ortíz as Andrea Arévalo Córdoba
- Carlos Villamizar as Adán Espinoza
