= Dulce amargo =

Venezuelan telenovela

- Genre: Telenovela
- Created by: Iris Dubs
- Based on: Los treinta by Marcelo Leonart, Nona Fernández, Hugo Morales and Ximena Carrera
- Written by: Verónica Bellver; Jose Vicente Quintana; José Manuel Peláez
- Directed by: Olegario Barrera; José Manuel Carvajal; Miguel Pineda; Luis Gaitán
- Creative director: Ana Rosa Gallegos
- Starring: Scarlet Ortiz; Erik Hayser; Fernando Noriega; Alejandra Ambrosi; Juan Carlos García; Roxana Díaz; Juan Carlos Martín del Campo; Alejandra Sandoval; Anabell Rivero; Carlos Guillermo Haydon
- Opening theme: "Una vida" by Leonel García
- Original language: Spanish
- No. of episodes: 120

Production
- Executive producer: Juan Pablo Zamora
- Producer: Mileyba Álvarez
- Editors: Cacho Briceño; Ray Suárez
- Camera setup: Multi-camera
- Production companies: Cadenatres; Televen

Original release
- Network: Televen
- Release: October 31, 2012 – April 2, 2013

Dulce Amargo (Bittersweet) is a Venezuelan telenovela produced and aired on Televen in co-production with Mexican channel Cadena Tres and distributed internationally by Telemundo. It is a remake of the Chilean telenovela Los treinta, which is adapted by Venezuelan writer Iris Dubs. Official production of Dulce Amargo began on June 11, 2012, and premiered on October 31, 2012 in the prime-time hours.

Scarlet Ortiz and Erik Hayser star as the main protagonists with Fernando Noriega and Juliet Lima as the main antagonists. The co-protagonists include Roxana Díaz, Juan Carlos Martín del Campo, Alejandra Ambrosi, Carlos Guillermo Haydon, Alejandra Sandoval, Juan Carlos García, and Anabell Rivero. This is the reunion project of Scarlet Ortiz and Roxana Díaz after Mis 3 Hermanas.

It is the second telenovela produced in high definition by Televen after Nacer Contigo, and the first to be co-produced with Cadena Tres. The cast is composed of Venezuelan, Mexican, and Colombian actors.

== Plot ==
Dulce Amargo focuses on five couples and their daily struggles. The main couple are Mariana and Nicholas, who are about to celebrate their seven-year anniversary. Mariana, overwhelmed by the concern that she can develop a hereditary mental illness, decides to leave her husband and son to make them avoid the pain of seeing her suffering. But soon after, she will be unwittingly captivated by a new passion, and behind this romance will hide the madness of a psychopath. Nicholas and Mariana's friends try to help, but they must first resolve their own conflicts, including infidelity, jealousy, ambition, and addiction.

Dulce Amargo is a contemporary love story, full of suspense and excitement, in which the fall in love, as in real life, can be bitter sweet.

== Cast ==
=== Starring ===
- Scarlet Ortiz as Mariana Wilhelm
- Erik Hayser as Nicolás Fernández
- Fernando Noriega as Diego Piquer
- Alejandra Ambrosi as Camila Ramos
- Juan Carlos García as Rubén Ascanio
- Roxana Díaz as Bárbara Aguilera
- Juan Carlos Martín del Campo as Juan Ángel Custodio
- Alejandra Sandoval as Sofía Hidalgo
- Anabell Rivero as Cristina Malavé
- Carlos Guillermo Haydon as Héctor Linares Alcantará

=== Also starring ===
- Oriana Colmenares as Andrea Hidalgo
- Carlos Felipe Álvarez as Jesús Andrés Aguilera
- Juliet Lima as María Gabriela Hernández / La Maga
- Cristóbal Lander as Julio César Bueno
- Beatriz Vásquez as Claudia de la Rosa
- Flor Elena González as Adoración Díaz
- Daniel Alvarado as Benito Montilla

=== Recurring ===
- Aileen Celeste as María Fernanda "Mafer" Aguero
- Gavo Figueira as Raymond Calzadilla
- Mariam Valero as Hortensia
- José Mantilla as Licenciado Albarrán
- Georgina Palacios as Laura Bello
- Elvis Chaveinte as El Loco Pereira
- Alejandro Díaz as Fernando
- Mariano Medina as Daniel Fernandez Wilhelm
- Arianna Lattierri as Lucía Linares Ramos
- María Verónica Ciccarino as Isabella Custodio Aguilera

== Awards and nominations ==
Year	Award	Category	Nominated	Result
2013	Premios Inter 2013	Best Telenovela	Dulce Amargo	Nominated
2013	Premios Inter 2013	Best Actress	Scarlet Ortiz	Nominated
2013	Premios Inter 2013	Best Supporting Actor	Juan Carlos García	Won
2013	Premios Inter 2013	Best Supporting Actress	Roxana Díaz	Won
2013	Premios Inter 2013	Best Actor of Revelation	Alejandro Díaz	Nominated
2013	Premios Inter 2013	Best Actress of Revelation	Oriana Colmenares	Nominated
2013	Premios Inter 2013	Best Song of telenovela	Leonel García	Nominated
2013	Premios Inter 2013	Better Executive Director	Olegario Barrera	Won
2013	Premios Inter 2013	Best Soap Opera Writer	Iris Dubs	Won
2013	Premios Inter 2013	Photography	Michelle Montes	Won
2013	Premios Inter 2013	Best Villain or Villain of the year	Fernando Noriega	Nominated
2013	Premios Inter 2013	Wardrobe	Helena Rivas	Nominated

== Versions ==
- Los treinta – telenovela made in 2005 by TVN, written by Marcelo Leonart, Nona Fernández, Hugo Morales and Ximena Carrera; and starring Francisco Melo, Alejandra Fosalba, Katyna Huberman, Malucha Pinto, Álvaro Espinoza, Luz Valdivieso, Andrés Velasco, and Juan José Gurruchaga
- Jura – telenovela made in 2006 by SIC, starring Ricardo Pereira and Patrícia Tavares
