= Jerónimo Gil =

Venezuelan actor

- Born: Jerónimo Javier Gil Manzanares; June 8, 1973 (age 51); Carúpano, Venezuela
- Occupation: Actor

Jerónimo Gil (born June 8, 1973) is a Venezuelan actor.

Jerónimo dated fellow actress Flavia Gleske and they have two children together, Allison Gil Gleske and Alan Gil Gleske. However, the couple broke up after Jerónimo ran his car through Flavia's apartment front door.

== Telenovelas ==
- 1998: Hoy te Vi as Johnny Fuentes
- 1999: Mujer Secreta as Danilo Bejarano
- 2000: Mis 3 Hermanas as Dr. Gustavo Martínez
- 2000: Angélica Pecado
- 2001: A Calzón Quitao as Paulino Almeida
- 2001: Carissima as Hector Coronel
- 2002: Mi Gorda Bella as Franklin Carreño
- 2004: ¡Qué buena se puso Lola! as Jorge (Benavides) Avellaneda
- 2006: Por todo lo alto as Alcides Urquiaga
- 2007: Mi prima Ciela as Abel Méndez
- 2009: Condesa por Amor as Fernando
- 2009: Los misterios del amor as Edwin Santeliz
- 2010: La mujer perfecta as Beto Pimentel
- 2012: Nacer Contigo as Caín Bermúdez
- 2015: Amor Secreto as Dr. Edgar Ventura
