= Salvador de mujeres =

- Genre: Telenovela; Drama
- Created by: Marcela Citterio
- Directed by: Gabriel González; William Barragán; Rolando Ocampo
- Starring: Carlos Guillermo Haydon; Alejandra Sandoval; Ruddy Rodriguez; Roberto Vander
- Opening theme: "El Amor" by Tito El Bambino
- Countries of origin: Venezuela; Colombia
- Original language: Spanish
- No. of episodes: 120

Production
- Executive producer: Alejandra Gallego
- Production company: Venevisión

Original release
- Network: Venevisión
- Release: 7 April – 28 June 2010

Salvador de Mujeres (Salvador:A Knockout Lover) is a 2010 Venezuelan telenovela produced by Venevisión. The telenovela was entirely shot in Colombia

Carlos Guillermo Haydon and Alejandra Sandoval star as the main protagonists with Ruddy Rodríguez portraying the main antagonist.

== Plot ==
Salvador “El Tigre” Valdez is a successful boxing champion whose career is ruined after he refuses to sign a deal with a mafia kingpin. As an act of revenge, he is framed so that he loses the national boxing championship and he is suspended from boxing for ten years. Now, Salvador is forced to seek other forms of income. He gets a job in a gym owned by Josefina Álvarez, a powerful and sophisticated woman who offers him a proposal he is forced to accept due to his serious financial problems. Salvador becomes a paid gigolo for some of the richest women in the city, and he now moves from being a champion in the boxing ring to being a champion in the bedroom.

However, Salvador's main goal is to conquer the heart of Socorro Alvarez Castillo, Josefina's and Julio César's daughter. Socorro is a beauty queen and model stuck in a failed marriage and she views Salvador as uncouth and beneath her standards. But with time, she also begins to fall in love with him. However, their love will be threatened by Josefina, who has also fallen in love with Salvador, her creation and manipulation tool.

== Cast ==
- Carlos Guillermo Haydon as Salvador Valdez "El Tigre"
- Alejandra Sandoval as Socorro Álvarez Castillo.
- Ruddy Rodríguez as Josefina Álvarez.
- Roberto Vander as Julio César.
- Carina Cruz as Lula Valdez.
- Yul Bürkle as Manuel.
- Franklin Virgüez as Don Carlos.
- Orlando Miguel as Felipe.
- Diana Ángel as Charo.
- Alberto Quintero as Fernando.
- Maleja Restrepo as Bárbara Valdez
- Pilar Álvarez as María viuda de Valdez.
- Vicente Tepedino as Gonzalo.
- Pedro Rendón as Andres.
- Katherine Escobar as Isabel Hernández.
- Gabriel Ochoa as "Ramiro Álvarez Castillo".
- Ana Bolena Mesa as "Mercedes".
- Shirley Marulanda as "Elena".
- Morella Zuleta as "Victoria".
- Helga Díaz
