= Mariú =

Venezuelan telenovela

- Genre: Telenovela; Romance; Drama; Frameup; Action
- Created by: Julio César Mármol
- Written by: Julio César Mármol; Laura Bottome; Melida Cristina Mármol
- Directed by: Olegario Barrera/Otto Rodriguez
- Starring: Daniela Alvarado; Carlos Montilla; Sonya Smith
- Opening theme: Perdóname Todo by Amaury Gutiérrez
- Country of origin: Venezuela
- Original language: Spanish
- No. of episodes: 113

Production
- Executive producer: Jhonny Pulido Mora
- Producer: Hernando Faría
- Production location: Caracas
- Editor: Ray Suárez
- Production company: RCTV

Original release
- Network: RCTV
- Release: 17 November 1999 – 14 June 2000

Related
- Luisa Fernanda; Hay amores que matan; La mujer sin rostro

Mariú is a Venezuelan telenovela produced by RCTV in 1999. It based on the telenovela La mujer sin rostro written by Julio César Mármol in 1984. Daniela Alvarado and Carlos Montilla starred as the main protagonists.

== Synopsis ==
María Eugenia Sampedro, simply known as Mariú is mistakenly caught up in the murder of Coralia Lozada de Gálvez the beloved wife of Emiliano Gálvez. In a story of obsessive persecution, frustration, passion and desire, Mariú will fall in love with Emiliano, her prosecutor. She must choose between keeping the love of her life through silence or losing him by revealing her true identity.

== Cast ==
- Sonya Smith as Coralia Lozada de Gálvez
- Daniela Alvarado as Maria Eugenia Sampedro
- Carlos Montilla as Emiliano Galvez Escorza
- Crisol Carabal as Amada Gálvez Escorza
- Dora Mazzone as Tibizaida Morales
- Henry Soto as Heriberto Bracho
- Vicente Tepedino as Malaquías Navarrete
- Iván Tamayo as Padre Justino Mata
- Verónica Ortiz as Aurora Gálvez Escorza
- Dessideria D'Caro as Ambar Sanayo
- Carlos Villamizar as Alejandro Gálvez
- Dalila Colombo as Piedad Sampedro
- Manuel Salazar as Jeremías Hidalgo
- Francis Rueda as Grecia Buenaventura de Lozada
- Jorge Palacios as Cornelio Lozada
- Martín Lantigua as Benigno Garcisilva
- Albi de Abreu as Marco Tulio Cárdenas
- Estefanía López as Andreina Reyes
- Carlos Guillermo Haydon as Romerito
- Francis Romero as Romelia Bernal
- Freddy Galavís
- Rosario Prieto
- Juan Carlos García as David Marcano
- Winston Vallenilla as Dr. Leonardo Izaguirre
- Yamilé Yordi as Cinthia Galvez Lozada
- Daniel Alvarado Jr as Juan de Dios Galvez
- Jesus Cervo
- Marcelo Cézan
- Eduardo Gadea Pérez as Alfonso Vicario
- Humberto García as Celso Sierra
- Samuel González as Roberto Reyes
- Nacho Huett
- Danny Jimenez
- Ricardo Malfatti
- Herminia Martínez as Anna Mercedes
- Sandy Olivares as Carlos
- Marielena Pereira as Mileidy
- Aracelli Prieto
- Leopoldo Regnault as Lazaro Reyes
- Alberto Rowinsky
- Freddy Salazar
- Jose Uriastegui
- Dilia Waikaran
