= Carlos Cruz (actor) =

Venezuelan actor

- Born: Carlos Alberto Cruz Castillo; December 21, 1960 (age 65); Caracas, Venezuela
- Occupation: Actor
- Years active: 1989–present
- Known for: Olegario Perez in Cosita Rica
- Children: twins Numan and Ivana

Carlos Cruz (born December 21, 1960, in Caracas, Venezuela) is a Venezuelan actor, best known for appearing in telenovelas.

== Filmography ==
=== Films ===
Year	Title	Role	Notes
1996	Aire Libre	Pedro Montanar	
1996	Lejos de África	Paco Romero	
2008	El enemigo	Benigno Robles	
2014	Corpus Christi	Miltón Ventura	
2015	El Malquerido	Portabeles	
2019	Historias Minimas	Padre	

=== Television ===
Year	Title	Role	Notes
1989	Rubí rebelde		Television debut
1989	Alondra		
1990	Caribe	Simon Caratti	
1990	De mujeres		
1990	Carmen querida		
1992	Por estás calles		
1993	De oro puro		
1995	Amores de fin de siglo	Nazario	
1995	Entrega total		
1997	María de los Ángeles	Héctor	
1999	Carita pintada	Eleazar Medina	
2000	Mis 3 hermanas	Augusto Estrada Rossi	Lead role
2001	Viva la Pepa	King Guagancó	
2001	A calzón quitao	Pedro Elías Ferrer	Lead role
2003	Cosita rica	Olegario Pérez	
2005	Soñar no Cuesta Nada	Dr. Zabaleta	
2005	Se solicita príncipe azul	Santiago Rivas	
2006	Ciudad Bendita	Baldomero Sánchez	
2008	Arroz con leche	Tomás Chacón	
2008	¿Vieja yo?		
2008	La vida entera	Próspero Bermúdez	
2009	Tomasa Tequiero	Antonio Bustamante	
2011	La viuda joven	Rogelio Galindez	
2011	El árbol de Gabriel	Maximiliano Reyes	
2013	Las Bandidas	Matacán	
2014	Nora	Raúl Carvajal	
2015	Piel salvaje	Ezequiel López-Méndez	Antagonist
