= Joselo =

Venezuelan actor and comedian

- Born: José Manuel Díaz Márquez; September 27, 1936; Barbacoas, Aragua
- Died: January 5, 2013 (aged 76); Caracas
- Occupations: Actor, comedian
- Years active: 1959–2012
- Notable work: El Show de Joselo; Humor con Joselo

José Manuel Díaz Márquez (September 27, 1936 – January 5, 2013) was a Venezuelan actor and comedian in television and film.

== Biography ==
Born in Barbacoas, Aragua, he was the younger brother of the singer and composer Simón Díaz. He played professionally under the name Joselo.

Initially, Joselo tried to emulate his older brother, although the ease of doing jokes about the daily life of the Venezuelan people set the course of his artistic career.

Joselo debuted on the popular sitcom Radio Rochela in 1959, aired by Radio Caracas Televisión, until it agreed on a long-term arrangement to keep him at the network by making him producer of his own weekly show, El Show de Joselo (1964–1972, 1981), which later was broadcast on Venevisión and was renamed Humor con Joselo (1973–1980, 1984–1993).

For nearly three decades, Joselo developed a significant number of characters in his weekly sitcom, effectively creating stereotypes and popular codes, conveniently remodeled and refined, achieving a deep approach to the lower and middle classes. Among his most popular characters are El Pavo Lucas, Madam Cosmetic, El Adeco y el Copeyano, El Dr. Chimbín, El Mendigo, El Doctor Pensamos, El Viejito de la Marabunta, El Licenciado Protocolo Esparragoza and El Roquero.

Joselo also played leading roles in Venezuelan and Mexican cinema, including El raspado and Yo, el gobernador, under the direction of René Cardona, Jr., and El reportero (1968), directed by Rafael Baledón.

In addition, he featured on radio and even recorded popular gaitas with his brother Simón under the guide of producer Hugo Blanco.

Joselo died in 2013 in Caracas, at age 76, after suffering from a liver illness.

== Selected filmography ==
Year	Title	Character	Director	Country	Refs
1964	El raspado	n/a	René Cardona, Jr.	Venezuela/Mexico	
1965	Yo, el gobernador	n/a	René Cardona, Jr.	Venezuela/Mexico	
1968	Operación carambola	as himself	Alfredo Zacarías	Mexico	
1968	Un extraño en la casa	as himself	Alfredo Zacarías	Mexico	
1968	El reportero	n/a	Rafael Baledón	Mexico	
1976	Los muertos sí salen	n/a	Alfredo Lugo	Venezuela	
1978	Pa' mí tú estás loco	n/a	César Cortez	Venezuela	
1979	El fascista, la beata y su hija desvirgada	Juan Gutiérrez de la Macorra	Joaquín Coll Espona	Spain/Venezuela	
1979	Reconcomio	n/a	Alfredo Lugo	Venezuela	
