= Lilibeth Morillo =

- Born: Lilibeth Rodríguez Morillo; June 12, 1969 (age 57); Caracas, Venezuela
- Origin: Venezuela
- Occupations: Singer, actress, hostess
- Years active: 1989–present
- Website: www.lilibethmorillo.com

Lilibeth Rodríguez Morillo (born June 12, 1969 in Caracas) is a Venezuelan singer, songwriter, actress and television host. She is the daughter of singer and actress Lila Morillo and famous singer José Luis Rodríguez "El Puma".

== Biography ==
Lilibeth began her career when she joined the cast of the telenovela Maribel alongside her sister Liliana Rodriguez and mother Lila Morillo.

She represented Venezuela in the OTI Festival 1990 with the song "Sé mujer".

In 2012, she starred in the Venevisión telenovela Mi ex me tiene ganas where she sang the theme song titled Amor de mis amores.

In 2015, she released her album titled Puerto seguro.

== Discography ==
- 2015: Puerto seguro

== Filmography ==
=== Soap operas (telenovelas) ===
| Year | Telenovela | Role | Notes |
|---|---|---|---|
| 1989 | Maribel | Andreína Colmenares | |
| 1991 | Mundo de fieras | Tamara Soriano | |
| 1992–1994 | Por estas calles | Yesenia | |
| 1994–1995 | Pura sangre | Corazón Silvestre | |
| 1997 | María de los Ángeles | María de los Ángeles Córdova Vargas | |
| 1998 | Enséñame a querer | Adriana Márquez | |
| 1999 | Enamorada | Cristina Guillén | |
| 2000–2001 | Viva la pepa | María José Maneiro "Mari Pepi" | |
| 2002 | La niña de mis ojos | María de la Luz Centeno | |
| 2005 | El amor las vuelve locas | Fernanda Santana | |
| 2006 | La viuda de Blanco | Haydée Blanco Albarracin | |
| 2008 | Alma Indomable | Abigail Richardi | |
| 2010 | Redención de amor | Perla Miranda/Pura Miranda | |
| 2012 | Mi ex me tiene ganas | Soledad Linares de Cordero | |

=== Series ===
- Decisiones
- Capítulo: Adictos
- Year: 2005
- Canal: Telemundo
- Lotería
- Capítulo: Dos Evas para un Adrían
- Año: 2006
- Canal: Telemundo

=== Movies ===
- Chao Cristina (RCTV, 2006) – Cristina

=== Programs ===
- Noche de estrellas: Premio lo Nuestro 2004 (2004)
- El gordo y la flaca (2003)

=== Contests ===
- Camino a la fama (2007) – Jurado (Televen)
