= Te tengo en salsa =

- Genre: Telenovela
- Created by: Ana Teresa Sosa; Neida Padilla
- Written by: Germán Aponte; Carmelo Castro; Daniel González; Verónica Álvarez; Manuel Mendoza
- Directed by: José Alcalde
- Creative director: Ana Rosa Gallegos
- Starring: Estefanía López; Luciano D'Alessandro; Eduardo Orozco; Mirela Mendoza
- Opening theme: "Te tengo en salsa" by Golpe bajo
- Country of origin: Venezuela
- Original language: Spanish
- No. of episodes: 100

Production
- Executive producer: Jhonny Pulido
- Producer: Mileyba Álvarez
- Production location: Caracas
- Cinematography: Mario Rinaldi
- Editor: Carlos Briceño

Original release
- Network: Radio Caracas Televisión
- Release: November 22, 2006 – May 1, 2007

Related
- Y los declaro marido y mujer; Mi prima Ciela

Te tengo en salsa is a Venezuelan telenovela created by Ana Teresa Sosa and Neida Padilla that premiered on RCTV on November 22, 2006, and ended on May 1, 2007. It stars Estefanía López, Luciano D'Alessandro, Mirela Mendoza, and Eduardo Orozco.

== Cast ==
=== Starring ===
- Estefanía López as Adriana Palacios
- Luciano D'Alessandro as Carlos Raúl Perroni Montiel
- Eduardo Orozco as César Román Perroni Montiel
- Mirela Mendoza as Ninoska Valladares

=== Also starring ===
- Hilda Abrahamz as Gioconda Chaparro
- Gigi Zancheta as Matilde Guillén De Palacios
- Kiara as Azalea Montiel De Perroni
- Roberto Moll as Salvatore Perroni
- Iván Tamayo as Humberto Sánchez
- Julio Pereira as Emiliano Palacios
- Gustavo Rodríguez as Emerson Chaparro
- Wanda D'Isidoro as Beatrice Perroni
- Juliet Lima as Patricia Palacios
- Alejandro Otero as Ignacio Fustinioni
- Emerson Rondón as Mauricio Arcaya
- Yoletty Cabrera as Francesca León
- Reinaldo Zavarce as Diego Sánchez
- Cristina Dacosta as Victoria Palacios
- Jeanette Flores as Clarisa López
- Claudia Moreno as Raiza Castañeda
- Sebastián Díaz as Mélgikson Chaparro
- Michelle Taurel as Alicia Rivero
- Jéssica Rodríguez as Vanessa Regalado
- Vanessa Flores as Sonalí Castillo
- Omaira Abinade as Leticia Pérez

=== Special participation ===
- Natasha Moll as Yuritzi Del Carmen Chaparro
- Luis Alfredo Olavarrieta as Yonlenon Chaparro
- Juan Carlos Lobo as Joel Morales
- Alicia Hernández as Desireé Salcedo

=== Guest stars ===
- Gabriel Fernández as Luciano Guillén
- Martha Olivo as Mamá Juana
