= A calzón quita'o =

Television series

- Genre: Telenovela; Romance; Drama
- Created by: Carlos Pérez
- Written by: Carlos Pérez; José Pulido; Angie Caperos Otxoa; José Vicente Quintana; Francisco Boza
- Directed by: Yuri Delgado
- Starring: Alba Roversi; Carlos Cruz; Jerónimo Gil; Jennifer Rodríguez
- Opening theme: A calzón quita'o performed by Oliver
- Country of origin: Venezuela
- Original language: Spanish
- No. of episodes: 152

Production
- Executive producer: Carmen Cecilia Urbaneja
- Producers: Armando Reverón Borges; José Gerardo Guillén
- Production locations: Caracas, Venezuela
- Cinematography: Adriana Bautista
- Editor: Tirso Padilla
- Camera setup: Multi-camera

Original release
- Network: RCTV
- Release: August 8, 2001 – March 15, 2002

A calzón quita'o (English title: The Naked Truth) is a Venezuelan telenovela written by Carlos Pérez and produced by RCTV in 2001. The telenovela was distributed internationally by RCTV International.

On August 8, 2001, RCTV started broadcasting A calzón quita'o weekdays at 9:00 p.m. The last episode was broadcast on March 15, 2002 with Juana la Virgen replacing it the following day.

Alba Roversi and Carlos Cruz star as the main protagonists with Jennifer Rodríguez, Jerónimo Gil and Nacarid Escalona as the antagonists.

== Plot ==
Pedro Elias and Clara are two souls who are meant for each other. Pedro is a brilliant lawyer that works for the common people while Clara is a passionate and courageous journalist. However, both of them are suffocated by their marriages. Pedro is married to Aida, a selfish and superficial woman who always blames him for working without pay and Clara to Paulino, a corrupt government official. When Clara is sent to do a story on a lawyer who defends the poor and the free, the two will come together to find happiness fulfilling one of their greatest desires: to promote a future of justice and hope in a region plagued by corruption. They star in this unique story told honestly, openly and reservations, simply ... the whole naked truth.

== Cast ==
- Alba Roversi as Clara Inés Ramírez
- Carlos Cruz as Pedro Elías Ferrer
- Jennifer Rodríguez as Cira Montoya
- Jerónimo Gil as Paulino Almeida
- Nacarid Escalona as Aída Berroterán de Ferrer
- Amanda Gutiérrez as Carmen Elena de Ramírez
- Leopoldo Regnault as Don Julio Ferrer
- Haydée Balza as Doña Rafaela de Ferrer
- Eduardo Gadea Pérez as Gobernador Contreras
- Manuel Escolano as Luis Rodríguez
- Rosario Prieto as Doña Celeste de Contreras
- Marian Valero as Lola Arismendi
- Luciano D´Alessandro as Abel Ferrer
- Leslie Correa as Regina Ferrer
- Alejandro Chaban as Amílcar José Almeida
- Alex Sánchez as Alejandro Izquierdo
- Luis Daniel Gómez as Careconflé
- Eduardo Orozco as Cabo San Román
- César Bencid as El Viejo Cruz
- Rosa Palma as Natalí
- Ana Beatriz Osorio as Zulaima
- Luis Fernández as Juan Antonio Contreras
- Marisa Román as Juliana
- Gabriel Fernández as Máximo Villaluisa
- Jessica Cerezo as Carlotica
- Dora Mazzone as Paula
- Flavia Gleske as Lilita
- Rodolfo Renwick as Salvatore
- Ileana Alomá as Amarilis
- Kristin Pardo as Gabriela
- Jesús Cervo as Capitán Cedeño
- Adriana Azzi as Ella Misma
- Katyuska Rivas
- Ogladih Mayorga
- Daniel Bailer as Mogollón
