= Catherine Correia =

Venezuelan television actress

- Born: Catherine Josefina Correia Barrera; January 28, 1975 (age 50); Caracas, Venezuela
- Occupation: Actress
- Years active: 1995–2003

Catherine Correia (born January 28, 1975), is a Venezuelan television actress. She has worked as an actress of telenovelas for Radio Caracas Televisión. She is best known for Carita pintada, Viva la Pepa and La cuaima. She began her acting career in 1995 and ended in 2003.

== Filmography ==
Television
Year	Title	Role	Notes
1995	El desafío	Teresita	
1995	Entrega total	Agatha	
1997	Llovizna	Salvaje Callao	
1998	Cambio de piel	Ana Virginia Arismendi	
1998	Aunque me cueste la vida	Julia Larrazábal	
1999	Carita pintada	Aurora Pabuena	Lead role
2001	Viva la Pepa	Pepita Lunar	Lead role
2003	La cuaima	Carmen "Carmencita" Meléndez	Lead role
