= Marlene de Andrade =

Venezuelan model and actress

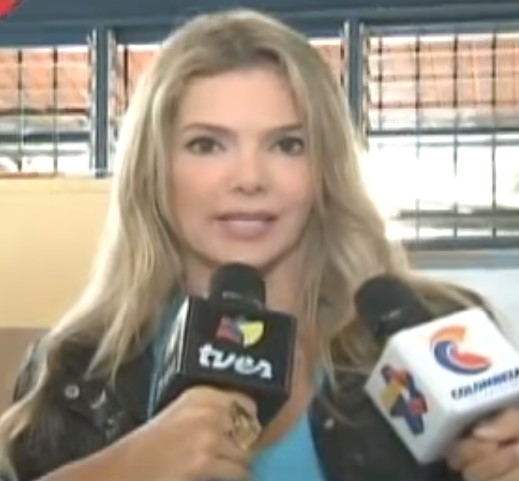
- Born: Zita Marlene de Andrade de Sousa; July 14, 1977 (age 49); Caracas, Venezuela
- Occupation: Actress
- Spouse: Winston Vallenilla (2005-present)
- Children: Winston Alexander Vasenilla

Zita Marlene de Andrade de Sousa Vallenilla (born Zita Marlene de Andrade de Sousa on July 14, 1977) is a Venezuelan actress, model and presenter and wife of Winston Vallenilla.

== Biography ==
Upon graduating from high school, Marlene began studying pharmacy at the Universidad Central de Venezuela. Her studies were interrupted when she entered into the Miss Venezuela Pageant in 1997. After participating in this event, she formally launched a career as a model and entered one of the modeling agencies in Venezuela. For several months, she worked as a photographic model in several countries such as Colombia, Dominican Republic, United States, Aruba and Japan.

After returning to Venezuela, she attended casting session by RCTV and was cast as a villain in the telenovela Carita Pintada. This was her first acting role. When filming of the telenovela ended, she enrolled in acting classes with Professor Nelson Ortega.

While filming the telenovela Mujer con pantalones in 2005, she met her current husband Winston Vallenilla. In August 2011, their first child, a son named Winston Alexander was born.

In 2008, she was cast as the villain of Leonardo Padrón's telenovela La vida entera.

In 2010, Marlene became an advertising model for Chicas Polar.

== Telenovelas ==
Year	Title	Role
1999	Carita Pintada	Pipina Hoffman
2000	Mis 3 Hermanas	Bárbara Solís Quintero
2001	La Soberana	Pura Benavides de Linares
2003	Trapos íntimos	Isabel Cordero
2005	Mujer con pantalones	María Isabel Torrealba
2006	Y los declaro marido y mujer	Elizabeth Zamora
2007	Arroz con Leche	Amanda Pacheco
2008	La vida entera	Lalymar "Laly" Falcón
2010	La mujer perfecta	Eva Gómez Valdés

== Films ==
- Una abuela virgen (2007)
