= La Invasora =

Television series

- Genre: Telenovela; Romance
- Created by: Iris Dubs
- Written by: Iris Dubs; Cristina Policastro; Zaret Romero; Germán Aponte; César Rojas
- Directed by: Otto Rodríguez
- Starring: Daniela Alvarado; Juan Carlos García; Sheyene Gerardi; Mimí Lazo; Jean Carlo Simancas; Rosalinda Serfaty
- Opening theme: "Alucinado" by Tiziano Ferro
- Country of origin: Venezuela
- Original language: Spanish
- No. of episodes: 150

Production
- Executive producer: Mariana Drujo
- Producer: Vladimir Salazar
- Production location: Caracas
- Production company: RCTV

Original release
- Network: RCTV
- Release: September 29, 2003 – April 14, 2004

Related
- Mi Gorda Bella; ¡Qué buena se puso Lola!

La Invasora (English title:My secret guest) is a Venezuelan telenovela developed by Iris Dubs and produced by Radio Caracas Television in 2003.

Daniela Alvarado and Juan Carlos García starred as protagonists with Rosalinda Serfaty, Jean Carlo Simancas, Mirela Mendoza and Carlos Arreaza as antagonists.

== Plot ==
Mariana is a young woman whose life changes drastically when her mother discovers that her step-father Alberto Maldonado put her photos on an internet website called sinvidaprivada.com. Mariana runs away and decides to hide in the house of Sergio, the man of her life where she will invade his life without him knowing about it.

== Cast ==
=== Main ===
- Daniela Alvarado as Mariana del Carmen Guerra
- Juan Carlos García as Sergio Martínez Aldana
- Mimí Lazo as Inés Guerra
- Jean Carlo Simancas as Ignacio Martínez Aguiar
- Rosalinda Serfaty as Alicia Fuentes Manso
- Fedra López as María Teresa Aldana
- Javier Vidal as Alejandro Reyes

=== Recurring ===
- Mirela Mendoza as Ana Victoria Fuentes
- Eliana López as Sofía Reyes Galié
- Carlos Arreaza as Reynaldo Fuentes
- Estefanía López as Maryuri Briceño
- Eduardo Orozco as Enrique Cárdenas
- Hugo Vásquez as José Miguel Briceño
- Manuel Salazar as Alberto Maldonado "El Beto"
- Carmen Julia Álvarez as Rosario Díaz
- Leopoldo Regnault as Jesús Briceño
- Freddy Galavis as Don Pedro
- Betty Ruth as Francisca
- Simón Gómez as Juan Carlos
- Josemith Bermúdez as Merly
- Líber Chiribao as Iván Robles
- Paula Bevilacqua as Vanessa Martínez Aldana
- Milagros Boullosa as Verónica
- Génesis Blanco as María Virginia Martínez Aldana
- Ángelo Goncalves as Diego Maldonado Guerra
- David Gutiérrez as Alán Reyes Galié
- Alexander Montilla as González
- José Romero as El Jhonny
- José Félix Cárdenas as Prof. Villegas
- Ana Gabriela Barboza as Raquel
- Zoe Bolívar as Magdalena
- Alejandro Palacios as Karl
- Nacho Huett as Guillermo
- Cristal Avilera as Kathy
- Alfonso Medina as Sebastián
- Ana Beatriz Osorio as Yadira
- Vicente Tepedino as Maximiliano Quiroz
- Linsabel Noguera as Xiomara
- Julio Pereira as Héctor Lander
- Sheyla Gutiérrez as La Mariposa
- Alessandra Guilarte as Abogada
- María Alejandra Requena as Pesentadora de Talk Show
