= Mujer secreta =

Television series

- Genre: Telenovela; Romance; Drama
- Created by: Alidha Ávila
- Written by: Alidha Ávila; José Manuel Peláez; Josefina Jordan; Sandra Caula; Ezequiel Borges
- Directed by: José Alcalde
- Starring: Carolina Tejera; Juan Carlos Vivas; Mariano Álvarez; Alba Roversi; Luis Fernandez
- Opening theme: "Como un Aleluya" by Sergio Dalma
- Ending theme: "Como un Aleluya" by Sergio Dalma
- Country of origin: Venezuela
- Original language: Spanish
- No. of episodes: 126

Production
- Executive producer: Andrea Gouverneur
- Producer: Wladimir Giménez
- Production location: Caracas
- Production company: RCTV

Original release
- Network: RCTV
- Release: June 2 – October 26, 1999

Related
- Carita Pintada

Mujer secreta (English title: Secret Woman) is a Venezuelan telenovela written by Alidha Ávila and produced by Radio Caracas Televisión in 1999. This telenovela lasted 126 episodes and was distributed internationally by RCTV International.

Carolina Tejera and Juan Carlos Vivas starred as the main protagonists with Mariano Álvarez and Alba Roversi as the antagonists.

== Synopsis ==
Eugenia is a beautiful and gentle woman trapped in an abusive marriage to her husband Gustavo Landaeta. She struggles to find herself, love and happiness as she debates whether to leave her husband or not as she blames herself for her husband's failures even though she knows that his mother Carlota who had a role to play in his current brutal behaviour and insecurities. Eugenia fears leaving Gustavo and being free to end up trapped in another prison. But her destiny changes when she meets Bernardo Valladares, Gustavo's cousin and one of the heirs to the Valladares group of banks. Eugenia feels safe and secure in Bernardo's arms and is able to forget her troubles. Although they love each other, they know their love is impossible due to Gustavo's emotional instability and ruinous ambition, and José Manuel, Bernardo's father who is also secretly in love with Eugenia and desires to make her his wife.

== Cast ==
- Carolina Tejera as Eugenia Sánchez de Landaeta
- Juan Carlos Vivas as Bernardo Valladares
- Mariano Alvarez as José Manuel Valladares
- Alba Roversi as Esperanza Salvat
- Carlos Camara Jr. as Javier Espinoza
- Luis Fernandez as Gustavo Landaeta
- Carlos Marquez as Don Julio Valladares
- Dad Dager as Cecilia Valladares de Espinoza
- Sebastián Falco as Jesus Beltran
- Maria Cristina Lozada as Yolanda de Valladares
- Herminia Martinez as Carlota Zanetti de Landaeta
- Rosario Prieto as Evencia de Romero
- Margarita Hernandez as Clemencia Hidalgo Ollarvide
- Leopoldo Regnault as Jose Clemente Bejarano
- Manuel Escolano as Esteban Itriago
- Ambar Diaz as Yuraima
- Alfonso Medina as Marcos Romero
- Betzabeth Duque as Manuela Itriaga
- Antonio Cuevas as Rodolfo Romero
- Aitor Gaviria as Asdrubal España
- Mirela Mendoza as Fatima Romero
- Solmaira Castillo as Ana María de Itriago
- Gabriela Santeliz as Adelaida Bejarano
- Leonardo Marrero as Orlando Contreras
- Jeronimo Gil as Danilo Bejarano
- Malena Alvarado as Magola
- Frank Spano as Alvaro Gil
- Mauricio Antonucci as Simon Romero
- Jorge Aravena as Sebastian Palacios
- Joel Borges as Pecas
- Martin Brassesco as Alexis Salgueiro
- Ivonne Conte as Celina
- Alejo Felipe as Horacio Santana
- Gaspar 'Indio' González as Celio
- Gledys Ibarra as Micaela Rojas
- Ralph Kinnard as Walter Newman
- Vito Lonardo as Paredes
- Gerardo Soto as Alfonzo Ponte
