= Viva la Pepa =

- Genre: Telenovela
- Created by: Valentina Párraga
- Screenplay by: Manuel Mendoza; Germán Aponte; Neida Padilla; Irene Calcaño
- Directed by: Olegario Barrera; Renato Gutiérrez; Otto Rodríguez
- Creative director: Rosa Helena Arcaya
- Starring: Catherine Correia; Lilibeth Morillo; Julie Restifo; Juan Pablo Raba; Juan Carlos Alarcón; Carlos Olivier; Flavio Caballero; Eduardo Serrano
- Opening theme: "Viva la Pepa" performed by Porfi Jiménez
- Country of origin: Venezuela
- Original language: Spanish
- No. of episodes: 197

Production
- Executive producer: Jhonny Pulido
- Producers: Hernando Faria; Olegario Barrera
- Production location: Caracas
- Editor: Alexis Montero
- Production company: RCTV

Original release
- Network: Radio Caracas Televisión
- Release: November 22, 2000 – August 7, 2001

¡Viva la Pepa! is a Venezuelan telenovela written by Valentina Párraga and broadcast by Radio Caracas Television between 2000 and 2001.

Catherine Correia, Lilibeth Morillo and Julie Restifo starred as the main characters, accompanied by Juan Pablo Raba, Juan Carlos Alarcón, Carlos Olivier and Flavio Caballero. Dad Dáger and Eduardo Serrano starred as antagonists.

== Cast ==
- Catherine Correia as Josefina Lunar Pepita
- Lilibeth Morillo as María José Maneiro Mari Pepi
- Julie Restifo as Josefa Lunar Pepa
- Juan Pablo Raba as Luis Ángel Perdomo
- Juan Carlos Alarcón as Luis Raúl Graziani
- Carlos Olivier as Pedro Galán "Perucho"
- Flavio Caballero as Gonzalo Iturriza
- Eduardo Serrano as Ulises Graziani
- Dora Mazzone as Yiya Bencecry
- Henry Soto as Ismael Bencecry
- Alfonso Medina as José de Jesús "J.J" Moncada
- Desideria D'Caro as Fedora de Graziani
- Mirela Mendoza as Susana Bencecry
- Eduardo Gadea Pérez as Rafael Perdomo
- Victoria Roberts as Rosario Morales
- Gonzalo Cubero as Jean François
- Virginia Vera as Cándida
- Anabell Rivero as Celina Requena
- Beatriz Fuentes as Violeta Ruíz
- Ramón Castro as Alberto Amengual "Bobby"
- Émerson Rondón as Rodríguez
- Freddy Galavis as Lorenzo
- Carlos Cruz as King "Guaguancó"
- Dad Dáger as Yakionassi Guaramato
- Bebsabe Duque as Yesenia Maneiro
- Bárbara Garófalo as Reinita
- Juliet Lima as Angélica
- Lila Morillo Mari Chucha Maneiro
- Humberto García as El Sr. Girón
- Kristin Pardo as Coralia
- Rosa Palma as Inés Briceño
- Gabriel Parisi as Inspector Medina
- Araceli Prieto as Mercedes
- Marisa Román as Mariana López
- Elena Toledo as Lissette Pinto
- Verushka Scalia as Doctora León
- Iván Romero as Matías
- Rhandy Piñango as Lindombi Guaramato
