= Carita Pintada =

Television series

- Genre: Telenovela
- Created by: Valentina Párraga
- Written by: Germán Aponte; Irene Calcaño; Romano Rodríguez
- Directed by: Yuri Delgado; Luis Enrique Díaz
- Starring: Catherine Correia; Simón Pestaña; Marlene De Andrade; Hilda Abrahamz
- Opening theme: "Píntame" by Elvis Crespo
- Country of origin: Venezuela
- Original language: Spanish
- No. of seasons: 1
- No. of episodes: 126

Production
- Executive producer: Leonor Sardi
- Producers: Armando Reverón Borges; Ana Vizoso González
- Production locations: La Guaira; Caracas
- Cinematography: Willie Balcazar
- Running time: 45 minutes
- Production company: RCTV

Original release
- Network: RCTV
- Release: August 25, 1999 – April 14, 2000

Related
- Mujer secreta; Hay amores que matan; De que te quiero, te quiero (2013)

Carita pintada is a Venezuelan telenovela written by Valentina Párraga and produced by Radio Caracas Televisión in 1999. The series lasted 126 episodes and was distributed internationally by Coral Pictures.

Catherine Correia and Simón Pestana starred as the main protagonists (with Simón playing a dual role as both protagonist and main antagonist) with Marlene De Andrade, Eliana López and Fernando Flores as the villains.

== Synopsis ==
The birth of the stunningly beautiful Aurora Pabuena is shrouded in mystery, and her life becomes a confusing maze of inexplicable deception, jealousy and danger. Left on the steps of the Church of San Rafael de la Peña, the infant Aurora is found by and taken under the loving wing of the delightful Candelaria, who happily raises Aurora as her own. Aurora's real mother is Irene, who sinks into a 20-year-old alcoholic haze after the newborn Aurora is taken from her. Irene's father, textile magnate Vicente, is responsible for the bastard child's disappearance, and his servant Elodia, the only one to know the truth, eventually blackmails him. Irene uncovers the plot and, upon discovering what happened to her child, rediscovers her own strength. The broken-down alcoholic emerges as a determined, powerful woman focused on one goal: finding Aurora.

Irene's nephews, the identical twins Diego and Rodrigo, are as different as night and day. They meet Aurora under amusing circumstances instigated by the lazy, disrespectful Rodrigo. Diego's goodness captivates Aurora, who immediately falls in love with him, but Rodrigo's crude playfulness soon turns dark and deceitful. A tragedy occurs, and Aurora is forced to escape to the city. Years of confusion and heartache follow, but the mystery begins to unravel once Aurora becomes a model for the "Carita Pintada" line of clothing that Irene has designed for Vicente's textile firm.

Aurora reunites with Diego, but all is not as it seems. What follows is a twisted web of obstacles that stands in the way of their happiness. By finally discovering her true identity, Aurora affirms the strength of an independent women who has the courage to follow their own heart. Supported by Candelaria's devotion, she reunites with Irene and is finally blessed with Diego's true love.

== Cast ==
- Catherine Correia as Aurora Pabuena
- Simón Pestana as Diego Caceres/Rodrigo Caceres
- Elluz Peraza as Irene Caceres
- Hilda Abrahamz as Candelaria Pabuena
- Luis Gerardo Nuñez as Martin Sucre
- Javier Vidal as Tadeo Vargas
- Fernando Flores as Vicente Caceres
- Eliana Lopez as Francoise Pabuena
- Carlos Cruz as Eleazar Medina
- Ricardo Bianchi as Alberto Sandoval
- José Gabriel Gonsalves as Luigi
- Elisa Stella as Belén de Medina
- Eduardo Gadea Perez as Teofilo
- Marlene De Andrade as Pipina Hoffman
- Rodolfo Renwick as Andres Figuera
- Virginia Vera as Elodia
- Violeta Aleman as Margot
- Nacarid Escalona as Karin Lopez
- Gonzalo Cubero as Father Francisco 'Pancho' de Asis Martínez
- Nacho Huett as Abdul Pabuena
- Henry Castañeda as Carlos Pereira
- Marcos Morffe as Paolo Pabuena
- Jeannette Lehr as Pilar
- Jessica Cerezo as Genesis
- Paola Eagles as Vallita Pabuena
- Carolina Muziotti as Kimberly
- Ivette Dominguez as Medusa
- Reina Hinojosa as Jessica
- Flavio Caballero as Jean François Sagmann
- Gabriel Parisi as Leo
- Roberto Mateos as Abdul Abdulah
- Julie Restifo as Conchetta de Rossi
- Carlos Olivier as Paolo Richi/Paolino Rossi
- Alba Roversi as Piera Bernal
- Rosa Palma as Damelys
- Juan Carlos Gardie as Cheo Salazar

== Later adaptation ==
This telenovela was remade in Mexico in 2013 as De que te quiero, te quiero, produced by Televisa.
