= Luis Gerónimo Abreu =

Venezuelan actor

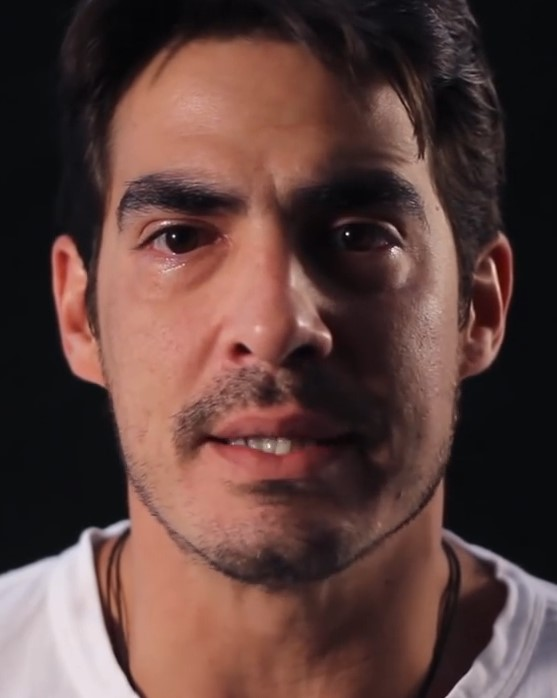
- Abreu in 2014
- Born: Luis Gerónimo Abreu Ascanio; 7 September 1972 (age 53); Caracas, Venezuela
- Occupation: Actor
- Years active: 1979–present
- Spouse: Claudia La Gatta (m. 2010)

Luis Gerónimo Abreu Ascanio (born 7 September 1972) is a Venezuelan actor best known for his performance in telenovelas.

== Biography ==
Luis Gerónimo Abreu was born in Caracas on 7 September 1972 to Luis Abreu, an actor and theater director and Haydée Ascanio, television and film screenwriter and producer. He began his acting career at an early age through the influence of his parents that were in the performing arts.

Abreu's mother took him to several of her film sets, thereby exposing Luis to the world of acting. His first acting job was at the age of 5 years in the Román Chalbaud film Bodas de papel alongside José Bardina and Marina Baura.

Abreu started his television career with his participation in the Venevisión telenovela Amor de Abril starring Eduardo Serrano. After this, he dedicated his time in participating in small roles in television miniseries and forming part of production crews and management.

Later, he returned to telenovelas in 2001 by landing a role in Leoandro Padrón's telenovela Amantes de Luna Llena. This served as a platform for the start of his international career. He got a starring role in a Peruvian telenovela titled Éxtasis. Afterwards, he returned to Venezuela to participate in a movie titled Plan B and to enter the cast of telenovela Cosita Rica produced by Venevisión in 2003 which became a hit that year. He then travelled to Mexico to participate in the TV Azteca telenovela La hija del jardinero. From Mexico, he moved to Colombia to play a role in Telemundo's telenovela La Tormenta in 2005.

Abreu returned to Venezuela to star in several Venevisión telenovelas such as Ciudad Bendita in 2006, Arroz con Leche in 2007 and La vida entera in 2008.

He obtained another starring role in 2009 in the telenovela Un Esposo para Estela alongside Daniela Alvarado. The telenovela was very successful in Venezuela where it maintained high broadcast ratings.

In 2011, he was cast as the protagonist in Martin Hahn's mystery telenovela alongside former beauty queen and Miss Venezuela winner Mariángel Ruiz in La viuda joven. The telenovela became a major hit that year.

In 2014, Abreu was cast as the main protagonist of Venevisión's telenovela Corazón Esmeralda alongside Irene Esser, Flavia Gleske and Jorge Reyes.

== Personal life ==
On 17 April 2010, Luis married his girlfriend, actress and model Claudia La Gata. Their wedding was televised live on the television show Super sábado sensacional. On January 17, the couple welcomed their first child, a son whom they named Salvador Abreu La Gatta.

== Filmography ==
=== Film roles ===
Year	Title	Roles	Notes
1979	Bodas de papel	Gustavito	
2002	Plan B	Gutiérrez	
2007	Miranda regresa	Younger Salim	
2014	Liz in September	Carlos	
2018	Death in Berruecos	Alejandro Godoy	
2018	La noche de las dos lunas	Alonso Aragón	
2022	Un Cupido Sin Punteria	Aquiles	
2023	Relatos Del Exilio	Jorge	
2024	Hambre		

=== Television roles ===
Year	Title	Roles	Notes
1988	Amor de Abril	Unknown role	
1995	Dulce enemiga	Unknown role	
1996	Pecado de amor	Unknown role	
1998	Jugando a ganar	Unknown role	
1998–1999	El país de las mujeres	Salvador Falcón	
2000–2001	Amantes de luna llena	Cristóbal Caballero	Recurring role; 76 episodes
2003	La hija del jardinero	Alfredo Anzola	
2005–2006	La Tormenta	Miguelón Camacho	
2006–2007	Ciudad Bendita	Jorge Venturini "Grillo"	
2008–2009	La vida entera	Guillermo Maduro	
2008–2009	Arroz con leche	Simón Herrera	Series regular; 155 episodes
2009	Un esposo para Estela	Adriano Filipo Alberti Menocal	Main role; 120 episodes
2011	La viuda joven	Alejandro Abraham	Main role; 142 episodes
2013	Los secretos de Lucía	Rubén Olmedo	
2014	Corazón esmeralda	Juan Andrés Montalvo Cordero	Main role; 138 episodes
2017	El Chema	Nelson Martínez	Recurring role; 36 episodes
2017	Para verte mejor	Onofre Villahermosa	Series regular; 92 episodes
2018	El Señor de los Cielos	Nelson Martínez	Recurring role (season 6); 2 episodes
2019	Bolívar	Simón Bolívar	Main role; 60 episodes
TBD	Dramáticas	TBA	

== Theater ==
- Mátame (2013)
