= Luisa Fernanda (TV series) =

- Genre: Telenovela; Romance; Drama
- Created by: Xiomara Moreno
- Written by: Luis Colmenares; Rossana Negrín; Xiomara Moreno
- Directed by: Otto Rodríguez
- Starring: Scarlet Ortiz; Guillermo Perez; Flavio Caballero; Dora Mazzone
- Opening theme: Más De Lo Que Pedi by Marta Sánchez
- Country of origin: Venezuela
- Original language: Spanish
- No. of episodes: 130

Production
- Executive producer: Carmen Cecilia Urbaneja
- Producer: José Gerardo Guillén
- Production location: Caracas
- Cinematography: Elisete De Andrade

Original release
- Network: RCTV
- Release: February 3 – August 24, 1999

Luisa Fernanda is a Venezuelan telenovela developed by Xiomara Moreno and produced by Radio Caracas Televisión in 1999. The telenovela is a free version of the radionovela Muchachas de hoy written by Inés Rodena.

Scarlet Ortiz, Desideria D'Caro, Crisol Carabal and Guillermo Perez starred as the protagonists with Dora Mazzone and Ricardo Álamo as antagonists.

== Plot ==
Three women will fall in love without thinking of the consequences of their passions. One of them is Luisa Fernanda, a rich, capricious and spoilt girl who is ignored by her father Ignacio Riera who despite being one of the most successful lawyers in Caracas is an alcoholic. The second is Alejandra, her friend, who claims to have found Fabian, the man of her dreams without knowing he is married. The third is Miriam, a girl from the countryside whose parents make sacrifices to fund her university education. She makes everyone believe she is rich but find it hard keeping appearances.

Luisa Fernanda falls in love with Professor Rodolfo Arismendi who begins teaching at the university where she studies law. Rodolfo is the boyfriend of Professor Alicia, an unscrupulous woman who pretends to be an angel in front of Rodolfo but is envious of Luisa Fernanda and hates her. To get back at Alicia, Luisa Fernanda makes a bet to seduce Rodolfo and take him away from her, but she ends up falling in love with him instead. The women’s brave pilgrimage empowers them to learn as they go, ultimately amassing the wisdom and inner strength necessary for finding the purity and power of real love.

== Cast ==
- Scarlet Ortiz as Luisa Fernanda Riera
- Guillermo Perez as Rodolfo Arismendi
- Flavio Caballero as Ignacio Riera
- Crisol Carabal as Miriam Linares
- Beatriz Valdes as Dinora Rodriguez
- Dora Mazzone as Alicia Suarez
- Henry Soto as Fabian Salgado
- Dilia Waikaram as Juanita
- Manuel Salazar as Vicenzio
- Humberto Garcia as Justo
- Chony Fuentes as Liliana de Arismendi
- Ricardo Álamo as Miguel Enrique
- Dessideria D'Caro as Alejandra
- Yul Bürkle as Gustavo Cazan
- Yoletty Cabrera as Gladys
- Gladiuska Acosta as Bombon
- Julio Cesar Castro as El Topo
- Gabriela Babino as Dubraska
- Ivan Tamayo as Mauricio Toscano
- Carlos Guillermo Haydon as Victor
- Maria Eugenia Favaro as Leticia Toscano
- Jennifer Milano as Laura Negrin
- Johnny Zapata as Taxista
- Angel Javier Bastardo as Picture
