= Eileen Abad =

Venezuelan actress and model (born 1973)

- Born: Eylin Antonieta Perez Arguinzones; November 15, 1973 (age 52); Caracas, Venezuela
- Occupations: Actress, Model
- Spouse: Carlos Guillermo Haydon (2002–2013)

Eileen Abad (born November 15, 1973) is a Venezuelan actress and model who has acted in several telenovelas and films.

== Biography ==
Abad studied drama at the Escuela de Artes Escénicas Juana Sujo. Her work in Venezuelan as well as Mexican and Colombian telenovelas has gained her recognition. Some of the most famous productions she took part in included Por estas calles, Amores de fin de siglo, Contra viento y marea, Calipso, Niña Mimada, El amor de mi vida (TV Azteca).

Among the awards she has received are Las Palmas de Oro (best performance, 99 México), Premio Nacional Casa del Artista as a young actress of the year (1998) and second in La Orden Francisco Fajardo.

She has participated in many big screen productions like Un tiro en la espalda (1995), Tokyo Paraguaipoa (1996), Entre mentiras (1996) Piel (1998) and Puras Joyitas (2007) are some of the highlights.

In 2010 she acted in the Telemundo series La Reina del Sur filmed in Miami, Mexico, Colombia and Morocco

=== Filmography ===
Films

- Un Tiro en la Espalda
- Tokyo Paraguaipoa
- Antes de Morir
- La Primera Vez
- Piel
- Entre Mentiras
- Puras Joyitas

=== Telenovelas ===
Year	Title	Character	Notes
1993	Por estas calles		
1995	Amores de Fin de Siglo		
1997	Contra Viento y Marea	La Nena	Supporting Role
1998	Niña mimada	Patricia Echegaray	Protagonist
1998	El amor de mi vida	Patricia	Main Antagonist
1999	Calypso	Yolanda Pujol de Martinez	Co-protagonist
1999	Besos prohibidos	Florencia	
2000	Angélica Pecado	Malena Vallejo	Co-protagonist
2001	La Soberana	Ana Ozores	Protagonist
2004	Negra consentida	Isadora Russian	Co-protagonist
2005	La Tormenta	Valentina Ayala	Supporting Role
2007	Arroz con Leche	Belén Pacheco de Morales	Protagonist
2009	Condesa por Amor	Ana Paula	Protagonist
2009	Los misterios del amor	Isabella Román	Main Antagonist
2010	Los Victorinos	Lucía	Supporting Role
2012	Mi ex me tiene ganas	Karen Miller	Antagonist
2013	Las Bandidas	Miriam	Special Appearance
2014	La virgen de la calle	Ana María Pérez	Co-protagonist
2016	Entre tu amor y mi amor	Beatríz Alicia Monserrat Caicedo	Antagonist

=== List of Unitarians ===
She has performed at Unitarian comedies like

- La Madre María de San José
- Doble Vida
- Felizmente Casada
- La Confesión
- Sagrada Familia
- Leonor
- La Vida es una Cebolla
- Decisiones

=== Theatre ===
- Intriga y Amor (Schiller) as Lady Milford,
- El Casamiento Forzoso (Molière) as Dorimea
- Las Preciosas Ridículas (Molière) as Madelón
- La Señorita Julia (August Strimbert) as Julia
- Fuenteovejuna (Lope De Vega) as Laurencia
- La Hora Menguada (Romulo Gallegos) as Enriqueta
- Altitud 3200 (Julien Lucharle) as Zizi

== Modeling ==
Eileen Abad has had a successful modeling career both in her native country and in other Latin American publications and specially in Mexico.
