= Carlos Guillermo Haydon =

Venezuelan actor and model (born 1976)

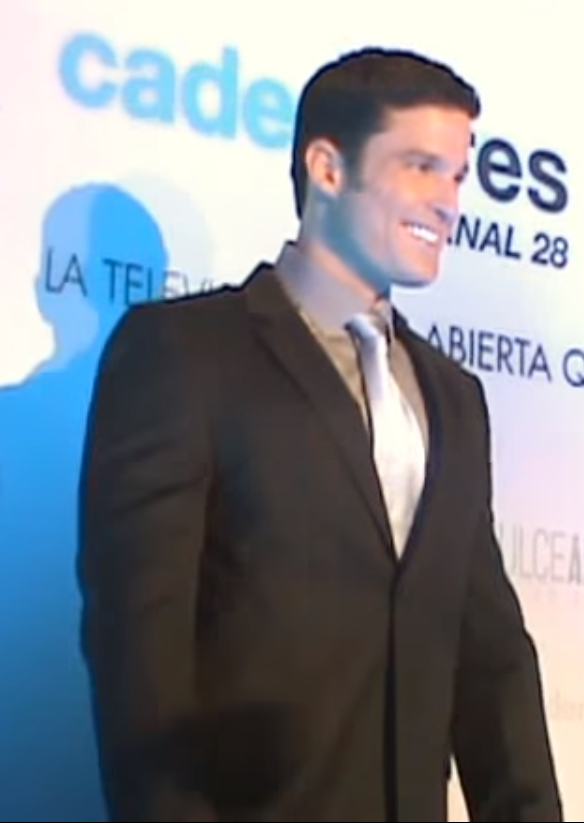
- Carlos Guillermo Haydon in 2013
- Born: Carlos Guillermo Haydon Otamendi; March 25, 1976 (age 49); Caracas, Venezuela
- Occupations: Actor, model
- Spouse: Eileen Abad (2002–2013)
- Partner: Roxana Díaz Burgos (2013–present)

Carlos Guillermo Haydon Otamendi (born March 25, 1976) is a Venezuelan actor and model known for his role in telenovelas. He is the nephew of Marcel Granier, CEO and Chairman of RCTV.

== Biography ==
Before venturing into acting, Carlos studied Advertising and Marketing at the Instituto Nuevas Profesiones. He started his acting career by working as a model in fashion shows and appearing in commercials while studying acting. He got an opportunity to study with acclaimed acting coach Nelson Ortega at Luz Columba, RCTV's acting school.

In 2010, he starred as the protagonist in the telenovela Salvador de Mujeres where he played a boxer and gigolo.

== Personal life ==
In 2002, Carlos began a relationship with fellow actress Eileen Abad. On 30 November 2007, they were officially married at Santa Ana de la Lagunita Church. In 2011, the couple welcomed their first child, a son named Christopher.

However, the couple began divorce proceedings in January 2013 citing irreconcilable differences and Carlos' ongoing relationship with his co-star in the telenovela Dulce Amargo, Roxana Díaz.

== Telenovelas ==
Year	Title	Role
1996	Sol de Tentación	
1998	Reina de Corazones	Adriano Vicentelli
1999	Luisa Fernanda (telenovela)	Víctor
2000	Mariú	Romerito
2000	Angélica Pecado	Darío Godoy
2001	La Soberana	Pancho Pepe Benavides
2002	Trapos íntimos	Mauricio Rossi
2004	¡Qué buena se puso Lola!	Julio Bravo
2006	Y los declaro marido y mujer	Efraín Tovar
2009	Si me miran tus ojos	Fernando
2010	Salvador de Mujeres	Salvador Tigre Valdez
2011	La viuda joven	Tomas Rullfo
2011	Corazón Apasionado	Diego Lozada
2012	Dulce Amargo	Hector Linares
2014	Escándalos	Ángel Lozada
2015	Vivir para Amar	Franco (A.K.A. "Hulk")
