= La vida entera =

- Genre: Telenovela
- Created by: Leonardo Padrón
- Written by: Carlos Eloy Castro; Camilo Hernández; Leonardo Padrón; Mariana Reyes; Elba Escobar; Jorge Lira
- Directed by: Luis Alberto Lamata; José Luis Zuleta; Édgar Liendo
- Creative director: Tania Pérez
- Starring: Anastasia Mazzone; Jorge Reyes; Carlos Montilla; Marlene De Andrade; Carlos Mata; Beatriz Valdés; Gustavo Rodríguez
- Theme music composer: Roque Valero
- Opening theme: "Las lágrimas aprender a reír" by Roque Valero
- Country of origin: Venezuela
- Original language: Spanish
- No. of episodes: 133

Production
- Executive producer: Consuelo Delgado
- Producers: Juan Carlos Farfán; Elizabeth Cermeno; Damaris Padilla; Wilfredo Mast; Ángel Ruiz
- Production locations: Caracas, Venezuela
- Cinematography: José Perez
- Editors: Moisés Guédez; Antonio Parada
- Camera setup: Multi-camera

Original release
- Network: Venevisión
- Release: March 9 – May 12, 2009

Related
- ¿Vieja yo?; Los misterios del amor

La vida entera (English title: For a lifetime) is a Venezuelan telenovela written by Leonardo Padrón and produced by Venevisión.

Production officially began in September 2008. On March 9, 2009, Venevisión began airing La vida entera at 9:00 pm, replacing ¿Vieja yo?. The finale was aired on May 12, 2009, with Los misterios del amor replacing it the following day. Univision aired La vida entera from April 5, 2010, at 6:00 pm.

Anastasia Mazzone and Jorge Reyes star as the protagonists while Marlene De Andrade stars as the antagonist. Carlos Montilla, Carlos Mata, Beatriz Valdés and Gustavo Rodríguez starred as stellar performances.

== Plot ==
Julieta Torres, known by her friends as 'Kotufa' (popcorn), is a social communication university student who is required to submit a thesis project on her favorite journalist. She approaches Salvador Duque, a handsome and intelligent journalist, who she admires a lot. Salvador works in Brazil and is only in Venezuela for a couple of days for a family party, when he meets Julieta. He shortly starts working at his father's newspaper. But the Duque Family also runs a women's magazine publication titled "Exquisita" . With time, the two fall in love with each other as they interact over their love of journalism and magazine publication.

Their growing love becomes complicated when Salvador's uncle, Cristóbal Duque also falls in love with Julieta. Cristóbal and Julieta meet the same day Salvador and Julieta meet. Julieta crashes Cristobal's car, where Cristobal falls in love with Julieta. Cristobal makes up things and follows Julieta so he could see her. Laly Falcón who is Salvador's girlfriend, does everything to separate the two lovers. Laly is an ambitious executive who wants to keep Salvador at her side in order to utilise his family's influence in the publishing business, especially considering that Salvador's father Napoleón Duque is a dominant figure in the publishing industry while his strict and demanding mother Olimpia is the editor-in-chief of the magazine where Julieta begins to work as an intern.

La vida entera explores the complex personal and professional relationships developed in workplace while looking at the intrigues and romances that surround the publishing business.

== Cast ==
=== Main ===
- Anastasia Mazzone as Julieta Torres “Cotufa”
- Jorge Reyes as Salvador Duque
- Carlos Montilla as Cristóbal Duque
- Marlene De Andradeas Laly Falcón
- Carlos Mata as Facundo Montoya
- Beatriz Valdés as Olimpia Duque
- Gustavo Rodríguez as Napoleón Duque

=== Also Main ===
- Crisol Carabal as Titina San Juan
- Carlos Cruz as Próspero Bermúdez
- Gledys Ibarra as Pasión Guerra
- Marisa Román as Carlota Duque “Tata”
- Roque Valero as Miki Mata
- Luis Gerónimo Abreu as Guillermo Maduro
- Tania Sarabia as Primitiva
- Lourdes Valera as Rosa Coronel†
- Héctor Manrique as Licenciado Merchán
- Daniela Bascopé as Natalia Montoya
- Henry Soto as Segundo Durán
- Roberto Lamarca as Tamanaco
- Beatriz Vázquez as Luz Mediante
- Basilio Alvarez as Philip Adelso Centeno
- Paula Woyzechowzky as Perla Reyes
- Mariángel Ruiz as Valentina Mata
- Mariaca Semprum as Mariví
- Adolfo Cubas as Javier
- Andreína Yépez as Tesoro
- Adriana Romero as Lupe
- Alejandro Corona as Canelón
- Pedro Durán
- Paula Beivilacqua as Vilma Trocónis
- Iván Romero as Severino
- Fernando Villate as Máximo Cuenca
- Cristóbal Lander as Gustavo
- Yina Vélez as Clarita
- Ligia Duarte
- Anna Massimo
- Elba Escobar as Cordelia
- Daniela Maya as Lucía Durán
- Cesar D' La Torre as Juancito
- Carlos Dagama as Daniel Torres
