= Un esposo para Estela =

- Genre: Telenovela
- Created by: Carlos Hernández
- Based on: Vendaval by Ángel del Cerro
- Screenplay by: Camilo Hernández; Elio Palencia; Elba Escobar
- Directed by: Claudio Callao
- Creative director: Daniela Ecarri
- Starring: Daniela Alvarado; Luis Gerónimo Abreu
- Music by: Franco de Vita
- Opening theme: "No se olvida" performed by Franco de Vita
- Country of origin: Venezuela
- Original language: Spanish
- No. of episodes: 120

Production
- Executive producer: Manuel Federico Grijalba
- Producer: Alejandro Salazar
- Production locations: Caracas, Venezuela; Curaçao
- Editors: José Leonardo Suárez; Omar Sabino
- Camera setup: Multi-camera

Original release
- Network: Venevisión
- Release: September 16, 2009 – March 5, 2010

Related
- La mujer del Vendaval

Un esposo para Estela (A Husband for Estela) is a Venezuelan telenovela written by Camilo Hernández based on an original story by Ángel del Cerro and produced by Venevisión in 2009. The telenovela was distributed internationally by Venevisión International.

Daniela Alvarado and Luis Gerónimo Abreu star as the protagonists while Carlota Sosa, Christina Dieckmann, Maria Antoineta Castillo and Carlos Julio Molina star as the antagonists. The telenovela was originally titled Vendaval de Amor before being changed to Un esposo para Estela.

== Plot ==
In the town of San Jacinto del Morichal, Estela Morales is a young orphan who owns a hacienda in ruins and buried in debt called "El Vendaval". Upon the death of her mother, Estela discovers she needs to get married in order to collect the inheritance her mother left. Desperate and seeking to get the money as the only way of saving the farm, she places an advertisement in the newspaper seeking for suitable candidates for a husband. Among the many men who respond to the announcement is Adriano Alberti (Luis Gerónimo Abreu) who is the heir of an international chain of hotels. He is the candidate who knows or knew her.

A month ago, the two had met on the island of Curaçao during a masquerade party. She wanted to die, he wanted to forget. For one night, these two had sex. The next day, the woman disappeared without a trace. Adriano woke up only to discover that an expensive necklace belonging to his family was no longer in the safe. Adriano decided to go to El Vendaval to recover the jewel he thinks Estela stole, but in reality he wants to prove that she is innocent.

== Cast ==
- Daniela Alvarado as Estela Morales
- Luis Gerónimo Abreu as Adriano Alberti
- Marcos Moreno as Feliciano Fundora
- Violeta Alemán as Herminia Morales
- María Antonieta Castillo as Maria Claudia Morales
- Carlos Julio Molina "Trece as Romulo Guevara
- Marjorie Magri as Clara Morales
- Antonio Delli as José Carlos Guerrero
- Bebsabé Duque as Cristina Vega
- Sonia Villamizar as Ornella Guerrero
- Carlota Sosa as Lic. Ricarda Roldan de Norigea
- Karl Hoffman as Mario Alberti
- Stephanie Cayo as Rogeila Guerrero/ Patricia Alberti
- Javier Valcárcel as German Urquiza
- Verónica Ortiz as Elvira Domínguez
- Martin Brassesco as Felipe Vega
- Eulalia Siso as Aitana Alberti
- Reina Hinojosa as Gilda Domínguez
- Christian Mc Gaffney as Delfín Fundora
- Greisy Mena as Malena Alberti
- Erick Noriega as Pio Doce
- Anahí as Roberta
- Guillermo García as Dorian Delgado
- Mauro Boccia as Dante Delgado
- Ludwig Pineda as Emeterio Peréz
- Christina Dieckmann as Jennifer Noriega Roldán
- Jesús Miranda "El Chino" as El Purri
- Adriana Prieto as Celeste
- Alicia Plaza as Pricilla
- Leopoldo Regnault
- Amalia Laurens
- Macarena Benitez
- Melisa Alvarez
- Regino Jiménez

== Version ==
- La mujer del Vendaval with Ariadne Díaz and José Ron for Televisa.
