= Niña mimada =

Television series

- Genre: Telenovela; Romance; Drama
- Created by: Valentina Párraga
- Written by: Sonia Nobre de Melo; Germán Aponte; Irene Calcaño
- Directed by: José Alcalde
- Starring: Jean Carlo Simancas; Carlos Cámara Jr. Marcelo Cezán; Eileen Abad; Alba Roversi
- Opening theme: Más que ayer by Marcelo Cezán
- Country of origin: Venezuela
- Original language: Spanish
- No. of episodes: 112

Production
- Executive producer: Carmen Cecilia Urbaneja
- Producer: José Gerardo Guillén
- Production company: RCTV

Original release
- Network: RCTV
- Release: February 11 – July 21, 1998

Niña mimada is a Venezuelan telenovela written by Valentina Párraga and produced by Radio Caracas Televisión in 1998. This telenovela lasted 112 episodes and was distributed internationally by RCTV International.

Eileen Abad and Marcelo Cezán starred as the main protagonists with Carlos Cámara Jr. and Scarlet Ortiz as the antagonists.

== Synopsis ==
Patricia Echegaray is a pampered child, who is forced to marry a ruthless business man in order to save her family’s fortune. She escapes and then meets Angel, a handsome and simple man, who teaches Patricia to appreciate every single thing of nature and life. But for Angel and Patricia the road to happiness will be paved with sinister secrets, limitless greed, and a hidden past.

== Cast ==
- Jean Carlo Simancas as Aurelio Echegaray
- Carlos Cámara Jr. as Joaquin Iriarte
- Marcelo Cezan as Angel Custodio
- Eileen Abad as Patricia Echegaray
- Alba Roversi as Natalia Jorda
- Sebastián Falco as Idrogo
- Scarlet Ortiz as Federica
- Dora Mazzone as Rosalia
- Ricardo Álamo as José 'Cheo' Mogollon
- Sheyene Gerardi as La Araña
- Virginia Lancaster as Cecilia Echegaray
- Eliana Lopez as Eme Eme
- Guillermo Perez as Vladimir Mogollon
- Francis Rueda as Margarita Mogollon
- Alejandra Salomon as Afrodita del Carmen
