= Winston Vallenilla =

Venezuelan television host and actor (born 1973)

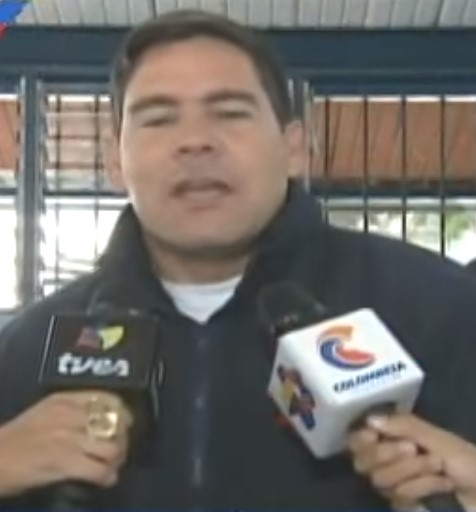
- Winston Vallenilla (2017)
- Born: Winston Teofilactes Vallenilla Hazell; September 22, 1973 (age 52); Caracas, Distrito Capital, Republic of Venezuela
- Occupations: Television host and actor
- Spouse: Marlene De Andrade

Winston Vallenilla (born Winston Teofilactes Vallenilla Hazell; September 22, 1973) is a Venezuelan television host and actor. Vallenilla is President of TVes (Televisora Venezolana Social), a Venezuelan television station managed by a foundation associated with the Venezuelan Ministry of Communications and Information. He is known and fiercely criticized for his political views and support of Chavismo. He was defeated as the 2013 PSUV candidate for mayor in the municipality of Baruta.

== Biography ==
Vallenilla was born in Caracas on 22 September 1973. In 1996, he participated in the Mister Venezuela competition. He ran unsuccessfully for the mayor of the Baruta municipality in 2013. and, as a political ally and supporter of Nicolás Maduro, was later named president of TVes.

He has been criticized for his messages regarding the political situation in Venezuela, and for calling opposition protests in Venezuela a "show"; Maduro responded that Vallenilla is an excellent man, and that critics are "envious".

== Personal life ==
Vallenilla is married to Zita Marlene de Andrade de Sousa (a.k.a. Marlene De Andrade), an actress. They met during the filming of the telenovela Mujer con pantalones in 2005. In August 2011, their first child was born.

== Filmography ==
Presenter

- Aló RCTV (RCTV)
- Aprieta y gana
- Animalia
- La Guerra de los sexos

Telenovelas

- 2012: Mi ex me tiene ganas as Espartaco Sansegundo
- 2006: Por todo lo alto as Ruben Alegría
- 2005: Mujer con pantalones as Juan José Rondón
- 2000: Mariú as Dr. Leonardo Izaguirre
- 1998: Aunque me Cueste la Vida as Pedro Armando Reverón
- 1996: La Llaman Mariamor as Jhonny
- 1992: Cara Sucia as Freddy
