= Bolívar (TV series) =

Colombian TV series

- Also known as: Bolívar, una lucha admirable
- Genre: Historical drama Telenovela; Biographical drama
- Created by: Juana Uribe
- Screenplay by: Juana Uribe; María Clara Torres; Ricardo Aponte; Leonor Sardi
- Story by: Camilo Uribe; Isabel Arroyo
- Directed by: Luis Alberto Restrepo; Andrés Beltrán; Jaime Rayo
- Creative directors: Guarnizo & Lizarralde
- Country of origin: Colombia
- Original language: Spanish
- No. of seasons: 1
- No. of episodes: 63

Production
- Executive producer: Asier Aguilar
- Editor: Fabián Rodríguez
- Production company: Caracol Televisión

Original release
- Network: Netflix (Worldwide); Caracol Televisión (Colombia)
- Release: 18 September – 20 December 2019

Bolívar, una lucha admirable (English: Bolívar, an admirable fight), or simply Bolívar, is a Colombian Spanish-language historical drama television series created by Juana Uribe, based on the life of Venezuelan liberator Simón Bolívar. The series stars Luis Gerónimo Abreu as Bolívar as an adult, José Ramón Barreto as Bolívar as a young man, Irene Esser as Bolívar's wife María Teresa del Toro, and Shany Nadan as his lover Manuela Sáenz. Maximiliano Gómez stars as Bolívar as a child. It was released on Netflix worldwide, except for Colombia, on 21 June 2019, followed by its debut in Colombia on Caracol Televisión on 18 September 2019.

The show is made up of 60 episodes that document the events of Bolívar's life from the age of seven until his death, primarily focusing on his formation as the liberator of several South American countries and his romantic engagements. However, the cast and crew also describe the show as an attempt to remove the veil of heroism covering the man and re-humanize him.

It was popular in Latin America, but the telenovela style and format alienated international viewers. Before its release, the show was publicly criticized by Venezuelan president Nicolás Maduro, with commenters believing he was concerned that a less legendary image of Bolívar would further reduce his popular support.

== Plot ==
The series features the life of Simón Bolívar in three stages, all played by different actors.

=== Book 1 ===
In his youth, Simón enjoys all the luxuries of a criollo life until his mother, then grandfather, die, leaving his future in the hands of his lecherous uncle Carlos, who also terrorizes the Bolívar slaves with the connivance of the corrupt judge Rivera. Simón, an active child, finds it hard to respond to traditional tutelage and is put under the care of a free-thinker, Simón Rodríguez, watching as the Spanish crown punishes dissenters. As he ages into young adulthood, he initially joins the military, but finds more success as a statesman, and travels to Spain to both further his education and seek the title afforded his name.

=== Book 2 ===
Arriving in Spain, Simón moves in with two of his wayward uncles while he is taught by a tutor. He fails to win back the family's noble title from the Court, but impresses the Queen, who orders Rivera's removal as judge and his replacement by Felipe, who enters into an illicit affair with Simón's sister Maria Antonio. Simón meets María Teresa del Toro and marries her after a overcoming opposition from her father and a jealous suitor. Upon arriving in Venezuela, María Teresa helps out at Simón's hacienda and is well regarded by the slaves; however, she dies after contracting yellow fever while purchasing back Simón's house slave Matea. Simón vows he will live in her spirit and never marry again.

Simón travels to Paris to drown his sorrows and is reunited with Simón Rodríguez, while his uncle Carlos dies destitute in Venezuela. Simón is encouraged to recover by his friends, and ultimately enrages Napoleon's adopted son enough to have himself firmly barred from the city; he returns to Venezuela to meet with the Caracas junta trying to govern Venezuela and propose a movement to independence. However, his efforts are thwarted by the vain Francisco de Miranda, leading to the Spanish reconquering Venezuela, but not before Simón has Miranda captured by the Spanish in revenge for the latter attempting to negotiate a last-minute surrender. Simón reestablishes himself in New Granada and leads a second campaign to liberate Venezuela, but is thwarted again by political jealousies and flees to Jamaica as the Spanish return.

In Ecuador, a young Manuela Sáenz gets into trouble at her convent. As she grows up, she is scarred after witnessing the Quito Revolution, but resolves to support the independence movement. Her father Simón arranges for her to be taken in by a sympathetic uncle who is also a priest. Manuela ends up sleeping with a Royalist soldier who takes advantage of her political views and pretends to be a revolutionary. The resulting scandal leads to Manuela being taken in by her stepmother, who teaches her how to act with caution. Manuela reluctantly accepts an offer of marriage from an English doctor, James Thorne, and the two move to Lima.

=== Book 3 ===
An adult Simón returns to Venezuela and camps out in the Llanos aided by Generals José Antonio Páez, and Francisco de Paula Santander as well as a force of British Legionnaires that include Colonel Daniel O'Leary, who becomes Simón's loyal chronicler. Simón fails to convince Páez to accompany him on his campaign to liberate New Granada, but the latter agrees to send some of his best soldiers under Jose Rondon to accompany Simón and Santander. After a grueling march through the Andes, Simón defeats the Spanish at Vargas Swamp and Boyacá before liberating Bogotá. As he sets off towards Peru, Simón appoints Santander as vice president to rule on his behalf in Colombia, but Santander's struggles to establish law and order in the new Gran Colombia come into conflict with Simón's constant demands for resources to remove the Spanish from South America altogether.

Manuela returns to Quito and helps out Simón's forces in the Battle of Pichincha. She catches Simón's attention at a ball, sparking a long-term romance that culminates with her being Simón's constant companion despite opposition from James, Lima's high society, and Colonel José María Córdova. With the Spanish defeat at the Battle of Ayacucho, Simón returns to Bogota, followed afterwards by Manuela. Their relationship is interrupted by Simón's continuing conflict with Santander and his supporters, culminating in the Septembrine Conspiracy in which Simón, with Manuela's help, narrowly survives a plot to assassinate him by Santander's supporters. Despite Santander being exiled as punishment, Simón is worn out by the ongoing political conflict, his failing health, and the death of Córdoba. He resigns shortly afterwards and prepares to go into exile abroad as Gran Colombia breaks apart, only to die in Santa Marta as Manuela grieves at being unable to accompany him.

== Cast and characters ==
An extensive cast list was published in July 2019 by Peruvian outlet El Comercio. In March 2018, Caracol announced members of the cast.

- Luis Gerónimo Abreu as Simón Bolívar
  - José Ramón Barreto as Young Simón
  - Maximiliano Gómez as Child Simón
- Shany Nadan as Manuela Sáenz
- Rosmeri Marval as María Antonia Bolívar Palacios
- Erick Rodríguez as Pablo Clemente Palacios
- Fernando Lara as José Miguel Camacho (Estanislao Vergara)
- Adrián Makala as José Palacios (mayordomo)
- Irene Esser as María Teresa Rodríguez del Toro y Alaysa
- Mauro Donetti as Feliciano Palacios de Aguirre y Ariztía-Sojo y Gil de Arratia
- Álvaro Bayona as Carlos Palacios y Blanco
- Juan Ángel as Bernardino del Toro Alayza
- Nohely Arteaga as María de la Concepción Palacios y Blanco
- Bryan Ruiz as Juan Vicente Bolívar
- Leónidas Urbina as José Antonio Páez
- Hans Martínez as Francisco de Paula Santander
- Juan Fernando Sánchez as José María Córdova
- Jefferson Quiñones as Dionisio Bolívar
  - Adolfo Murillo as Child Dionisio
- Mauricio Mejía as Juan José Rondón
- Ed Hughes as Daniel Florencio O'Leary
- Juan Carlos Ortega as General James Rooke
- Abril Schreiber as Pepita
- Adelaida Buscato as Lucía
- Carlos Gutiérrez as Joaquín Montesinos
- Bárbara Perea as Hipólita Bolívar
- Margoth Velásquez as Tomasa
- Jorge Sánchez as Luis Tinoco
- Ana Harlem as Matea Bolívar
- Juan de Xaraba as José Patricio de Rivera
- Pablo Soler as Secretario Oídor
- Laura Leyton as Juana Nepomucena
- Giroly Gutiérrez as Doctor Virgilio Trespalacios
- Pedro Roda as Soldado Ponte
- Esperanza Rivas as Mirta María
- Carlos Andrés Ramírez as Antonio Nariño
- Manuel Vallejo as Víctor
- Félix Antequera as Francisco de Miranda
- José María Galeano as Felipe Martínez

== Production ==
=== Development ===
The show was one of Colombia's most expensive to produce ever, with its producers describing it as the "most ambitious series in the history of Colombian television." It was created by Caracol and co-produced with Netflix, which has a global distribution deal for the series; Netflix has previously distributed several Caracol shows, including The Girl, The Queen of Flow, Undercover Law, and Surviving Escobar: Alias JJ. The show is not dubbed into English, unlike other Spanish-language media on Netflix, but has subtitles in English, Portuguese, and Spanish.

According to Semana, Caracol did not use deadlines when creating the series, instead letting their teams work to make the show as good as it could be. Additionally, as the landmark series produced for the company's 50th anniversary and the bicentennial of independence, it was reportedly given "unequaled scrutiny". The producers considered many influences and potential creatives for the show, looking at the best of Colombian telenovelas like Yo soy Betty, la fea, and talent including screenwriter Julio Jimenez and actor Diego Álvarez. Ultimately, Juana Uribe was chosen to be showrunner and head writer. Uribe then brought on two historians, a researcher, and three writers "who had read practically every biography in existence" about Bolívar. Rather than a straight telenovela, the show has been described as an historical biography or period drama, as well.

As a period drama, the show used costume design to present the period accurately; the hats worn by Manuela have been described as exact to the different locales she inhabits, as well as period. Shany Nadan also commented that because of the different views on personal appearance at the time, "it did not matter if [she] showed up with rumpled hair" to film, as that is how it would have been in reality.

=== Casting and characterization ===
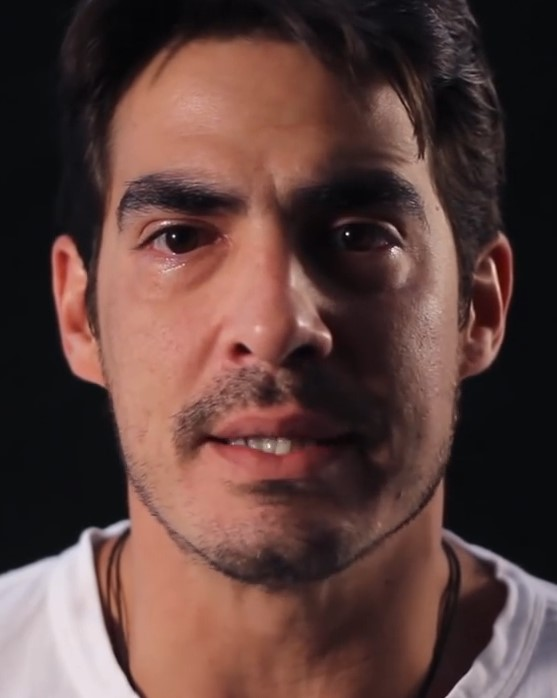
Luis Gerónimo Abreu plays the oldest iteration of Simón Bolívar, and worked on creating his character with fellow actor José Ramón Barreto

On 7 March 2018, José Ramón Barreto and Irene Esser were confirmed as protagonists of the first part of the story. Luis Gerónimo Abreu was confirmed for the second part, along with Shany Nadan to depict Manuela Sáenz. Of the three actors to play Bolívar, only one is not Venezuelan: the Colombian actor Maximiliano Gómez. About 400 actors are used in the series, with 6,000 extras.

The storytelling intention during the conception of the series was discussed by Abreu in interviews. According to BBC Mundo, the show "intersperses the story of the young and orphaned Bolívar and the angry, idealistic and passionate Bolívar"; in his interview, Abreu said that the creative team did this because they "wanted to humanize him, with his defects and his mistakes, [...] Because Bolívar was not a bronze superhero like the statues, but a human being, rather small and modest, who without superpowers became a superhero of flesh and blood."

To create the character, Abreu, Barreto, and the writers and directors had meetings where they built their version of Bolívar. They designed him in a way to bring him down to a realistic level rather than be the hero taught in history classes, because, according to Abreu, Venezuelan people think "he was a superhero or that he had a space hammer or that a radioactive spider bit him", referring to popular Marvel Comics superheroes. Barreto explains this further, saying that while he felt honored to play the hero he grew up with, he also hoped that the series would allow people to interrogate Bolívar's life and "question for themselves the cult that has been given to 'the military, the boots, the leaders'." Barreto says he hopes for this because of the nation's political crisis, saying that Venezuela in 2019 "doesn't need a liberator [...] We need 30 million liberators, a population who become aware of the historical moment we are in and who do not wait for a liberator. That would be a mistake. We need to mature as a society so as not to repeat those historical errors."

As with Bolívar, Nadan indicates there was the same aim to give her role as Manuela Sáenz a more complex characterization, saying that the production "wanted her to be fascinating and charming, strong but feminine, cunning and strategist, fresh but passionate, proud but also dedicated and generous". She explains that to embody Manuelita, she trained with three acting coaches for several months, exploring what made her the person she was, as well as taking horseback riding lessons. Abreu has said that the show presents an image of Manuela that reinforces the value of women in war.

Barreto was contacted about casting when his telenovela, Para verte mejor (in which he was also co-lead with Abreu), was ending in 2017. To help him land the role, he borrowed a stallion from a friend's club to practice riding on, dressing up as Bolívar to make a demonstration video of his skills and his passion to get the iconic image of Bolívar correct that he sent to the producers. After being cast, he was given more formal horseback riding lessons, as well as combat ones. Of his casting, Barreto says he expected to get the role of Juan Vicente, though he auditioned for Simón, because he does not think he looks like Simón Bolívar; on the press tour he used this story to tell people in Colombia that, unlike what many are used to in the region, television may now be casting more by talent than appearance.

=== Filming ===
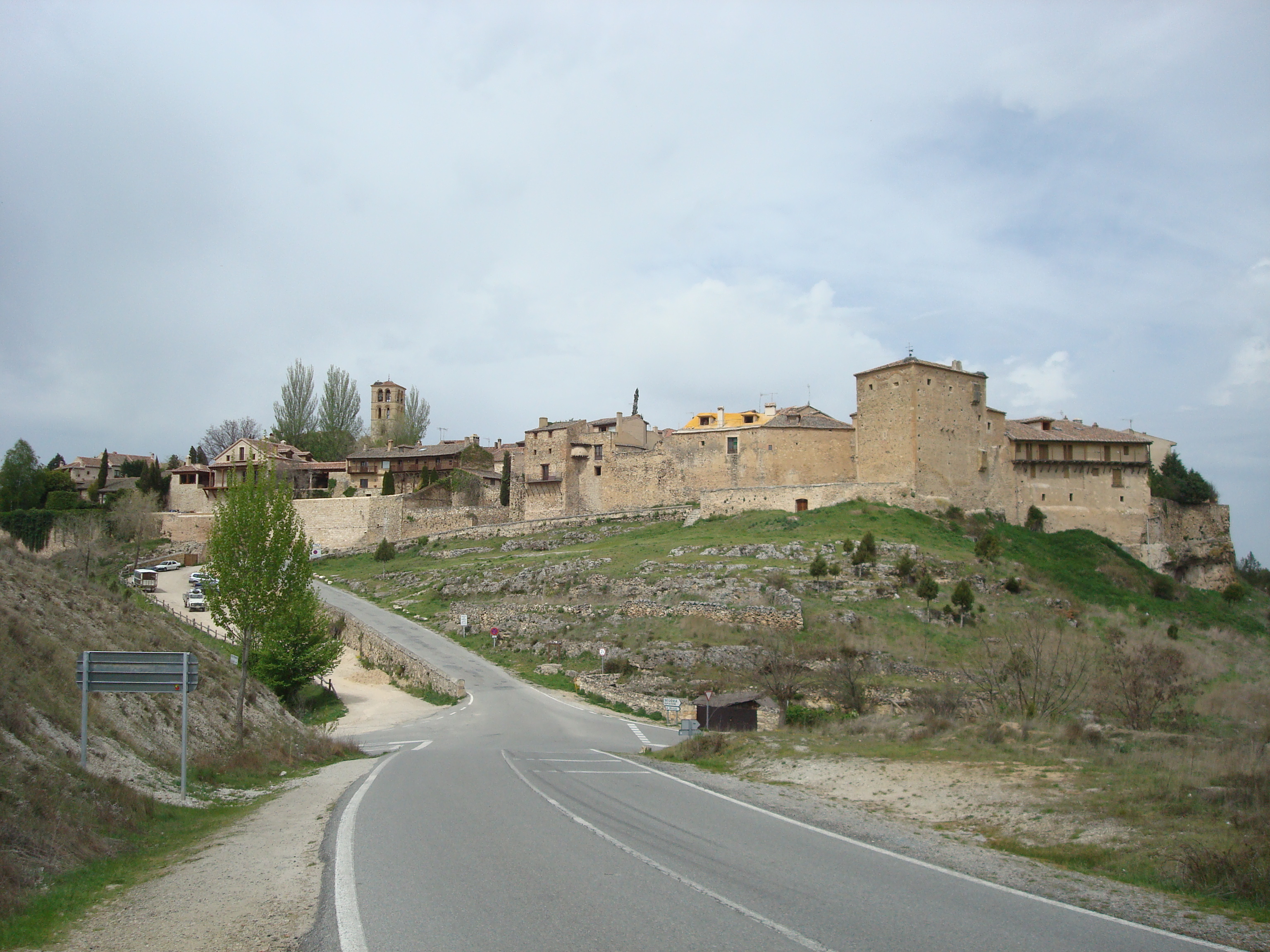
The del Toro's La Sierra retreat was filmed in Pedraza, with the producers describing it as frozen in time

Filming of the series began on 7 March 2018 in Cartagena, Colombia. The series was shot primarily in Colombia, featuring cities such as Villa de Leyva, Monguí, Santa Fe de Antioquia, Calí, Popayán, and natural areas in the Los Nevados National Natural Park, El Páramo de Oceta, as well as the Eastern Plains of Colombia. In May 2018, Caracol, with the assistance of local production by Galdo Medio, began filming in Spain. Scenes in Spain were shot in Toledo, with the production also being able to shoot some scenes on the Lavaderos de Rojas estate; in Aranjuez; and in Pedraza. Some parts of the series were filmed between the border of Venezuela and Colombia. Three production units were used, with simultaneous filming lasting from March through September 2018.

Producer Asier Aguilar says that finding locations to recreate the colonial settings was difficult, but that trying to find locations for certain historical moments set in Venezuela was harder because of the country's biodiversity; as an example, Aguilar says that they had to recreate a low-lying coastal Vargas swamp in a town near Boyacá, 3,000 metres up in the Andes mountains.

== Reception ==
=== Critical response ===
While some critics found elements of the show enjoyable, many responses have focused on questions of historical accuracy, production value, and the length of the series, knowing it was to be first released around the world.

John Serba's Decider episode one review notes that it covers a lot of history in a short time, with humorous remarks like mentioning that Simón is "not yet 13, but will be by the end of the episode" and suggesting that "[a]t this rate, we'll get back to the revolution in about 30 or 40 episodes". Despite this, Serba was impressed at the money and care put into the show, describing the detail of the soldiers' uniforms and the many background extras in every scene. He settles on calling the show "a soap opera at heart", and notes that though "[t]he production isn't chintzy like a soap opera, [the] 60 episodes must have been cranked out in a similarly quick, efficient manner" – though he writes that the most soap opera-like element is its "uber-melodramatic tone". Serba commends the historical accuracy, but worries that the necessary commitment to 60 episodes may be off-putting for U.S. and UK audiences, who are used to much shorter series and miniseries. On the Decider rating scale, which is either "skip it" or "stream it" (based on video-on-demand terminology), Serba concludes that it is worth it to "stream it".

Kahron Spearman for The Daily Dot was less complimentary. He establishes various historical views of Bolívar and says that "his story deserves an abundance of space, depth, and dignity", criticizing Netflix and Caracol for different elements of the production that he sees as preventing this, including their decision that "an unreasonable 60-episode schedule was something the people required". Compared to Serba, Spearman believes that there was not enough money and care given to the series, and that a shorter run with the same budget would have allowed them to pay more attention to detail; he also comments that so much of the budget was spent on grand orchestral music for even mundane moments that it "proves bloated and silly", and begins to criticize the dialogue writing before suggesting "lazy translations" have muddied this aspect of the show. He does say that the acting is "stronger" than he expected from a telenovela, and specifically congratulated Abreu for "manag[ing] to humanize Bolívar to a great extent", but still concludes that the show's production values and telenovela style make it difficult to watch, especially with a "laborious" 60 episodes of 50 minutes each to be viewed.

An article on the series by famous Venezuelan historian Inés Quintero at analysis aggregator Prodavinci shared some of the same concerns as Spearman, styling her criticism as an argument against the biographical historical drama genre in general through examples of the show, calling it "a story, not history" and saying that while its lack of production value doesn't help, "the fundamental reason" for her to not like the show is a pretense of historical accuracy when its true intentions are "to entertain and engage". Quintero suggests that choosing the flashbacks of the first episode were a tactic used to make the viewers' first image of Bolívar be that of a revolutionary hero, rather than a boy, and accuses the show of creating characters as more interesting and diverse than the real people.

Ecuadorian newspaper El Universo and their media reviewer "Mr Smith" moved away from historical accuracy and reviewed the show as a work of television. Smith said he "forgives" Gómez, the child Simón, for his character, as he had to deal with the "uninteresting" writing of the first few episodes, and commends the other Bolívars, Barreto and Abreu, for their "remarkable job reflecting the eccentricities, convictions and boldness, as well as the sensitivity" of the character. Smith questions why the childhood years were not left out or only included in flashbacks, especially as they serve little to the plot, but writes that "[t]he art direction is pure quality" enough to make him interested in the period where history books have failed. Reviewing more of the series than his counterparts, Smith also describes the chemistry between Abreu and Nadan, who plays the third iteration of Bolívar's lover Manuela Sáenz, positively.

Juancho Parada for El Tiempo questioned if the series was necessary, saying that it was only created for the bicentennial of Colombia's independence and criticizing almost every element of its production and storytelling, as well as saying that the promotional tour was too short to gather interest. Parada suggests that there are other films and series made about Bolívar that are better in terms of production and accuracy that audiences could already watch.

=== Popular response ===
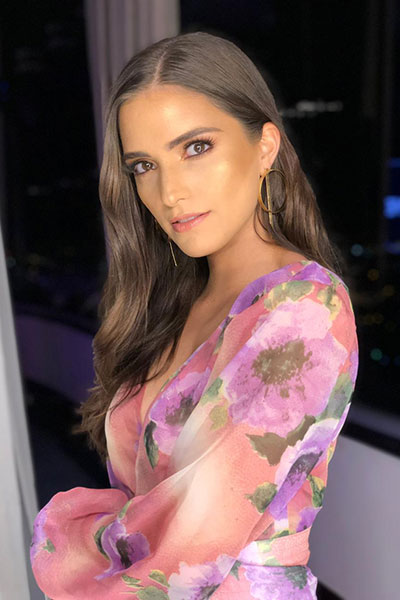
Shany Nadan has received honors in her home country for her depiction of Manuela Sáenz; both are Ecuadorian

The public response to the show was seen as very positive in Latin America, but it was not as well appreciated in the United States; Semana suggests that this is because of the 60-episode format that is unfamiliar to many of these viewers and seen as too long. However, Abreu thinks that the show was relatively popular worldwide based on his own measurement scale, saying that he is "full of pride" that "on Wikipedia, the first month it aired, it [Bolívar] was among the most searched words".

A former mayor of the Ecuadorian city Guayaquil, Jaime Nebot, watched the show and enjoyed the performance of Guayaquil-born actress Shany Nadan so much that he recommended her to the current mayor, Cynthia Viteri, to be given an official honor. She received the medal of Guayaquil at the time and then, shortly before the Colombian broadcast of the show, was named Tourism Ambassador of Ecuador by President Lenín Moreno.

Venezuelan historian Inés Quintero questioned the historical accuracy of the series and pointed out multiple inaccuracies, such as the fact that Pablo Clemente y Palacios (Bolivar's uncle) was intellectually disabled, that Josefa Tinoco (his brother Juan Vicente's wife) was the daughter of the foreman of the San Mateo Hacienda, or that the whole family lived together in the hacienda. Quintero also criticized the historical simplification, including the representation of the Spaniards as the main villains or that of Francisco de Miranda as a traitor to the cause of independence.

=== Maduro criticism ===
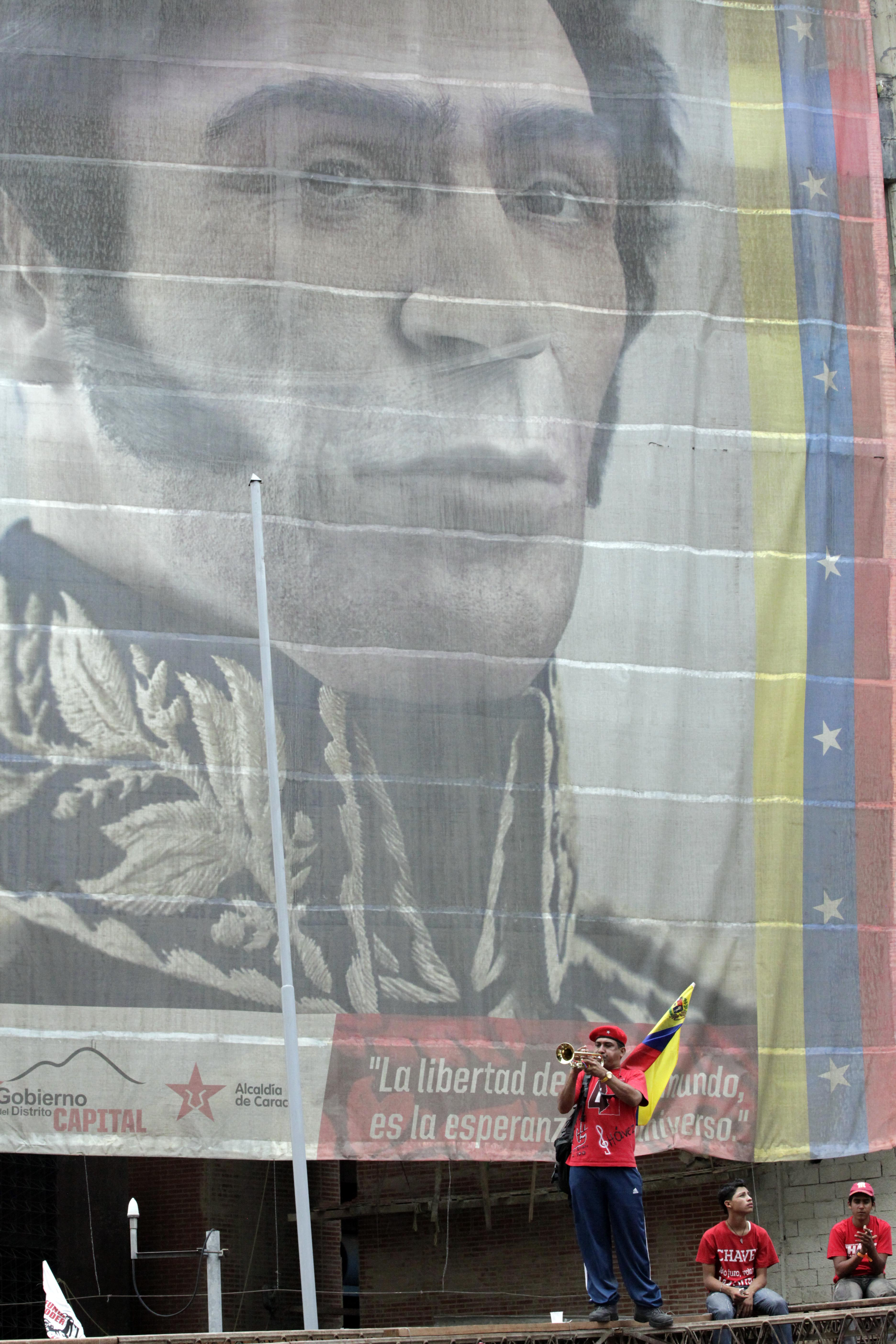
Nicolás Maduro's first inauguration was celebrated with a giant banner of Bolívar

Before the series premiered, it was heavily criticised by Venezuelan President Nicolás Maduro, who was angry about potential defamation, wanting to preserve Bolívar's image and tell everyone that Bolívar was Venezuelan, not Colombian, saying the other country was "running a hate campaign". Abreu, who plays the adult Bolívar in the show, responded to this comment by saying "You will have to watch it first before saying if you like it or not, and we will accept that opinion then, that is what free speech is"; he also said: "I think you have issues that are much, much more important to deal with, though". Nadan, playing the adult Manuela Sáenz, responded more diplomatically by saying that "everyone is free to view the series in their own way". In August 2019, Maduro apologized for his comments and congratulated the actors for their performances.

Analyzing Maduro's criticism, historian Omar Galíndez spoke to BBC Mundo, suggesting that Maduro's "excessive zeal" to control the narrative surrounding Bolívar comes from a Chavist skepticism; that Hugo Chávez' revolution used the ideals and legendary status of Bolívar for its political gain, which, while highly criticized, forms the ideological basis for Maduro's power and support. Diario Las Américas has also stated that they believe Maduro's statements came from a place of wanting sole guardianship of Bolívar's image and a fear of Colombia and the United States using the show to try and overthrow him, additionally noting the politically-sensitive time of its release. One media writer to mention political context, though not acknowledging concern that the show could be politically-motivated, was Brett White, in a series overview; he agrees with Abreu's response, linking to the Wikipedia page about the 2019 Venezuelan presidential crisis in a comment saying that he does not have space to explain, "but let's just say that Maduro has a lot more to be worried about than a Netflix series."

Semana described Maduro's criticism of the show as an example of the Streisand effect; by discrediting it before it was even released, he interested more people in Latin America in watching it.

BBC Mundo wrote in July 2019 that "Maduro's statement dominated the first reviews" of the show. In his review of the first episode, John Serba of Decider comments on Maduro's response, noting that Bolívar liberated more than just Venezuela. In Kahron Spearman's highly critical The Daily Dot review, he says that "[i]t's not often that a Netflix series creates political strife", as Maduro's accusations of Colombia had, but assured that though Maduro worried about the series disrespecting Bolívar, "[t]hat's not what he needed to be concerned about", slating the show for its quality and adding that "Maduro had a point". In their medium-focused review, El Universo jokes that they will leave accuracy criticisms to the experts or to "the fan that is President Maduro, who has already made a few comments".

== Television broadcast ==
The entire first season was first released on streaming service Netflix on 21 June 2019; the series went to air in Colombia on 18 September 2019.

In September 2019 before the show began broadcasting in Colombia, members of its cast took a press tour around the country to promote it. A launch party was held in Cali.

Viewership and ratings per season of Bolívar
Season	Episodes	First aired		Last aired		Avg. viewers (millions)	18–49 rank
Season	Episodes	Date	Viewers (millions)	Date	Viewers (millions)	Avg. viewers (millions)	18–49 rank
1	63	18 September 2019	11.7	20 December 2019	8.1	10.25	TBD

=== Episodes ===
The episodes shown on Netflix and in Colombia have differences. Additionally, on Netflix, the episodes are untitled.

No.	Title	Original release date	Colombia viewers (millions)
1	"Empezó la historia más esperada: Bolívar, el hombre, el amante, el libertador"	18 September 2019	11.7
Title in English: "So begins the most-awaited history: Bolívar, the man, the lover, the liberator"
2	"La ambición y la vileza de Carlos Palacios no tiene límites"	19 September 2019	10.7
Title in English: "The ambition and vileness of Carlos Palacios is limitless"
3	"¿Se volverán a ver?, Bolívar se separa de su maestro Simón Rodríguez"	20 September 2019	10.4
Title in English: "Will they see each other again?, Bolívar is separated from his teacher Simón Rodríguez"
4	"¡Buen viento!, Simón Bolívar parte a España en búsqueda de un título noble"	23 September 2019	12.0
Title in English: "Bon voyage!, Simón Bolívar departs for Spain in search of a noble title"
5	"Bolívar cruzó el océano para encontrar la dulzura en los ojos de una mujer"	24 September 2019	11.4
Title in English: "Bolívar crossed an ocean to find sweetness in a woman's eyes"
6	"¿Se robará el amor de María Teresa?, Bolívar deja en ridículo a Lorenzo de Ulloa"	25 September 2019	12.8
Title in English: "Who will steal the affections of María Teresa?, Bolívar ridicules Lorenzo de Ulloa"
7	"Ruin y traicionero, Lorenzo de Ulloa enloda el nombre de Simón Bolívar"	26 September 2019	11.6
Title in English: "Sly and treacherous, Lorenzo de Ulloa muddies the name of Simón Bolívar"
8	"El amor de Bolívar por María Teresa no da espera"	27 September 2019	10.5
Title in English: "Bolívar's love for María Teresa grows restless"
9	"¡Hasta que la muerte los separe!, Bolívar y María Teresa se casan"	30 September 2019	10.9
Title in English: "Till Death Do They Part!, Bolívar and María Teresa wed"
10	"Bolívar llega con María Teresa a Caracas para reclamar lo que le pertenece"	1 October 2019	11.7
Title in English: "Bolívar arrives in Caracas with María Teresa to reclaim that which is his"
11	"¿Qué ocurrirá?, María Teresa contrajo una fiebre maligna"	2 October 2019	12.1
Title in English: "What's occurring?, María Teresa contracts a malign fever"
12	"Una siniestra pesadilla se repite, el Libertador pierda a su amada esposa"	3 October 2019	11.9
Title in English: "A sinister nightmare repeats itself, the Liberator loses his beloved wife"
13	"¿Ahogará Bolívar sus penas con un nuevo amor?"	4 October 2019	11.5
Title in English: "Can Bolívar drown his sorrows in a new love?"
14	TBA	7 October 2019	12.5
15	"Carlos Palacios fallece en su propia miseria"	8 October 2019	12.7
Title in English: "Carlos Palacios falls at the hand of his own misery"
16	"¿María Antonia aceptará irse a Cuba con el oidor Felipe Martínez?"	9 October 2019	11.4
Title in English: "Will María Antonia accept judge Felipe Martínez' Cuba proposal?"
17	"Bolívar forma la Sociedad Patriótica"	10 October 2019	12.7
Title in English: "Bolívar forms the Sociedad Patriótica"
18	"La Sociedad Patriótica librará su primera batalla"	11 October 2019	11.7
Title in English: "The Sociedad Patriótica will fight their first battle"
19	"Miranda le da la espalda a Simón Bolívar en medio de una batalla"	15 October 2019	11.8
Title in English: "Miranda abandons Simón Bolívar in the middle of battle"
20	"Bolívar recorre los pueblos del Magdalena reclutando gente para su ejército"	16 October 2019	11.4
Title in English: "Bolívar travels the towns of Magdalena to recruit his army"
21	"¿Bolívar accederá a cambiar su estrategia de lucha?"	17 October 2019	11.3
Title in English: "Will Bolívar be able to change his plan of action?"
22	"Bolívar hará todo lo necesario por consolidar la República de Venezuela"	18 October 2019	10.5
Title in English: "Bolívar has done everything necessary to unite the Republic of Venezuela"
23	"Indoblegable, El Libertador se marcha de Venezuela para planear su ofensiva"	21 October 2019	11.9
Title in English: "Unbreakable, The Liberator leaves Venezuela to plan his offensive"
24	"Bolívar sobrevive a un tenebroso atentado contra su vida"	22 October 2019	9.6
Title in English: "Bolívar survives a mysterious attack on his life"
25	"¡A todo galope!, Bolívar llegó por la libertad de los pueblos"	23 October 2019	10.4
Title in English: "Charging in! Bolívar arrives for the freedom of the people"
26	"Bolívar saca la espada, pero con argumentos demuesta su liderazgo"	24 October 2019	11.0
Title in English: "Bolívar draws his sword, but leadership is shown with words"
27	"¿Pepita aguantará junto a Bolívar los obstáculos que imponen la causa?"	25 October 2019	9.9
Title in English: "Will Pepita and Bolívar endure the obstacles in their path?"
28	"¿Se enamoró Santander de Feliza Mora?"	28 October 2019	10.6
Title in English: "Has Santander fallen in love with Feliza Mora?"
29	"¡Inmenso general!, Santander no defraudó y llegó con más de un millar de hombres"	29 October 2019	10.4
Title in English: "Great general! Santander doesn't betray and arrives with more than a thousand men"
30	"De la adversidad florece la vida: Nació la bebé salvadora"	30 October 2019	10.9
Title in English: "Life springs from adversity: the savior baby is born"
31	"Feliza pasa por alto a Santander y a Bolívar para estar en el campo de batalla"	31 October 2019	9.4
Title in English: "Feliza discards Santander and Bolívar to fight on the battlefield"
32	"Llegó la hora, Bolívar y sus hombres librarán la Batalla del Pantano de Vargas"	1 November 2019	10.4
Title in English: "The time has come, Bolívar and his men will fight the Battle of Pantano de Vargas"
33	"¿Abandonará el ejército patriota al malherido general Rooke?"	5 November 2019	9.5
Title in English: "Does the wounded patriot general Rooke abandon the army?"
34	"¡Con la frente en alto!, el ejército patriota venció en el Puente de Boyacá"	6 November 2019	9.2
Title in English: "With heads held high!, the patriot army wins at Puente de Boyacá"
35	"¡Bolívar entró triunfante a Santa Fe!"	7 November 2019	10.5
Title in English: "Bolívar arrives in Santa Fe triumphant!"
36	"¿Se frustrará la campaña libertadora de Bolívar en Quito y Lima?"	8 November 2019	9.3
Title in English: "Is Bolívar's liberation campaign impeded in Quito and Lima?"
37	"¡Simón Bolívar y Manuelita Sáenz al fin se conocieron!"	12 November 2019	10.3
Title in English: "Simón Bolívar and Manuelita Sáenz finally meet!"
38	"¡Bolívar y Manuelita se dejaron llevar por la pasión!"	13 November 2019	9.5
Title in English: "Bolívar and Manuelita are carried away with passion!"
39	"Por la causa patriota, Santander y Dionisio tienen un altercado"	14 November 2019	9.1
Title in English: "For the patriotic cause, Santander and Dionisio fight"
40	"¿Obtendrá la libertad el patriota Humberto López?"	18 November 2019	10.6
Title in English: "Will the patriot Humberto López win his freedom?"
41	"El Libertador y el Protector juntos. Bolívar y San Martín se conocen"	20 November 2019	9.5
Title in English: "The Liberator and the Protector together. Bolívar and San Martín meet"
42	"James emprenden camino a Guayaquil en busca de Bolívar y Manuelita"	21 November 2019	9.7
Title in English: "James is on the way to Guayaquil in search of Bolívar and Manuelita"
43	"Desde la cima de un volcán, Bolívar declaró que la libertad es imparable"	22 November 2019	10.1
Title in English: "From the top of a volcano, Bolívar declares that freedom is unstoppable"
44	"Marcela desolada encontró en Don Gervasio un apoyo genuino"	25 November 2019	10.7
Title in English: "Marcela the desolate finds genuine support in Don Gervasio"
45	"¿Santander apoyará a Bolívar en el Congreso en su intención de liberar a Perú?"	26 November 2019	9.1
Title in English: "Santander supports Bolívar in Congress in his intention to liberate Peru?"
46	"Santander se ve atrapado en una terrible encrucijada"	27 November 2019	9.0
Title in English: "Santander is trapped in a terrible crossroads"
47	"¡Qué viva el general!, Bolívar luchó por la libertad de Perú"	28 November 2019	8.7
Title in English: "Long live the general! Bolívar fights for the independence of Peru"
48	"Santander les presenta a los ciudadanos su plan de educación pública"	29 November 2019	9.1
Title in English: "Santander presents his public education plan to the citizenry"
49	"Bolívar y Manuelita vuelven a sentir el fulgor de la pasión como antes"	2 December 2019	8.6
Title in English: "Bolívar and Manuelita feel the glow of passion again, just like before."
50	"¡Bolívar llegó a Bogotá y el pueblo lo recibió con alegría!"	3 December 2019	9.2
Title in English: "Bolívar goes to Bogotá and the people receive him with joy!"
51	"La Gran Colombia está en riesgo y Bolívar tendrá que viajar a Venezuela"	4 December 2019	9.7
Title in English: "Gran Colombia is in peril and Bolívar must go to Venezuela"
52	"Bolívar viaja hasta Venezuela para negociar con Páez"	5 December 2019	8.8
Title in English: "Bolívar goes to Venezuela to negotiate with Páez"
53	TBA	6 December 2019	9.3
54	TBA	9 December 2019	9.7
55	"¿Atraparán al máximo responsable del asesinato del padre Ardila?"	10 December 2019	9.6
Title in English: "Will they catch the mastermind behind the murder of Father Ardila?"
56	"El pueblo de Bogotá enardecido reclama justicia por la muerte del sacerdote"	11 December 2019	9.7
Title in English: "The enraged people of Bogotá demand justice for the death of the priest"
57	"El Libertador descubrió que gobernar es un ejercicio ingrato"	12 December 2019	9.3
Title in English: "The Liberator discovers that governing is a thankless exercise"
58	"La asamblea sesionó: ¿Cuál constitución ganará, la de Bolívar o la de Santander?"	13 December 2019	9.1
Title in English: "The assembly is in session: Which constitution will win, that of Bolívar or that of Santander?"
59	"Manuelita prepara una fiesta para celebrar los 45 años de Bolívar, ¿asistirá?"	16 December 2019	7.6
Title in English: "Manuelita prepares a feast to celebrate Bolívar's 45 years, will he attend?"
60	"Bolívar se siente furioso e increpa a Manuelita por su comportamiento"	17 December 2019	6.9
Title in English: "Bolívar is furious and rebukes Manuelita for her behavior"
61	"Los conspiradores fraguaron un siniestro plan: el magnicidio de Bolívar"	18 December 2019	7.8
Title in English: "The conspirators hatch a sinister plan: the assassination of Bolívar"
62	"La audacia de Manuelita Sáenz le salvó la vida a Simón Bolívar"	19 December 2019	8.0
Title in English: "Manuelita Sáenz' audacity saves the life of Simón Bolívar"
63	"Llegó a su fin la historia de un héroe admirable, Bolívar: El hombre, el amante, el libertador"	20 December 2019	8.1
Title in English: "The story of an admirable hero comes to an end, Bolívar: The Man, the lover, the liberator."

== Awards and nominations ==
Year	Award	Category	Recipient	Result	Ref.
2019	Produ Awards	Super Series	Bolívar	Won	
2019	Produ Awards	Opening Theme	Bolívar	Nominated	
2019	Produ Awards	Director	Luis Alberto Restrepo, Andrés Beltrán and Jaime Rayo	Nominated	
2019	Produ Awards	Producer	Asier Aguilar	Nominated	
2019	Produ Awards	Showrunner	Juana Uribe	Nominated	
2019	Produ Awards	Writer	Juana Uribe	Won	
2019	Produ Awards	Musical Composer	Jox	Nominated	
2019	Produ Awards	Lead Actor	Luis Gerónimo Abreu	Nominated	
2019	Produ Awards	Supporting Actress	Irene Esser	Won	
2019	Produ Awards	Revelation Actor	Maximiliano Gómez	Nominated	
