= María Teresa Rodríguez del Toro y Alaysa =

Wife of Simón Bolívar

María Teresa Rodríguez del Toro y Alayza
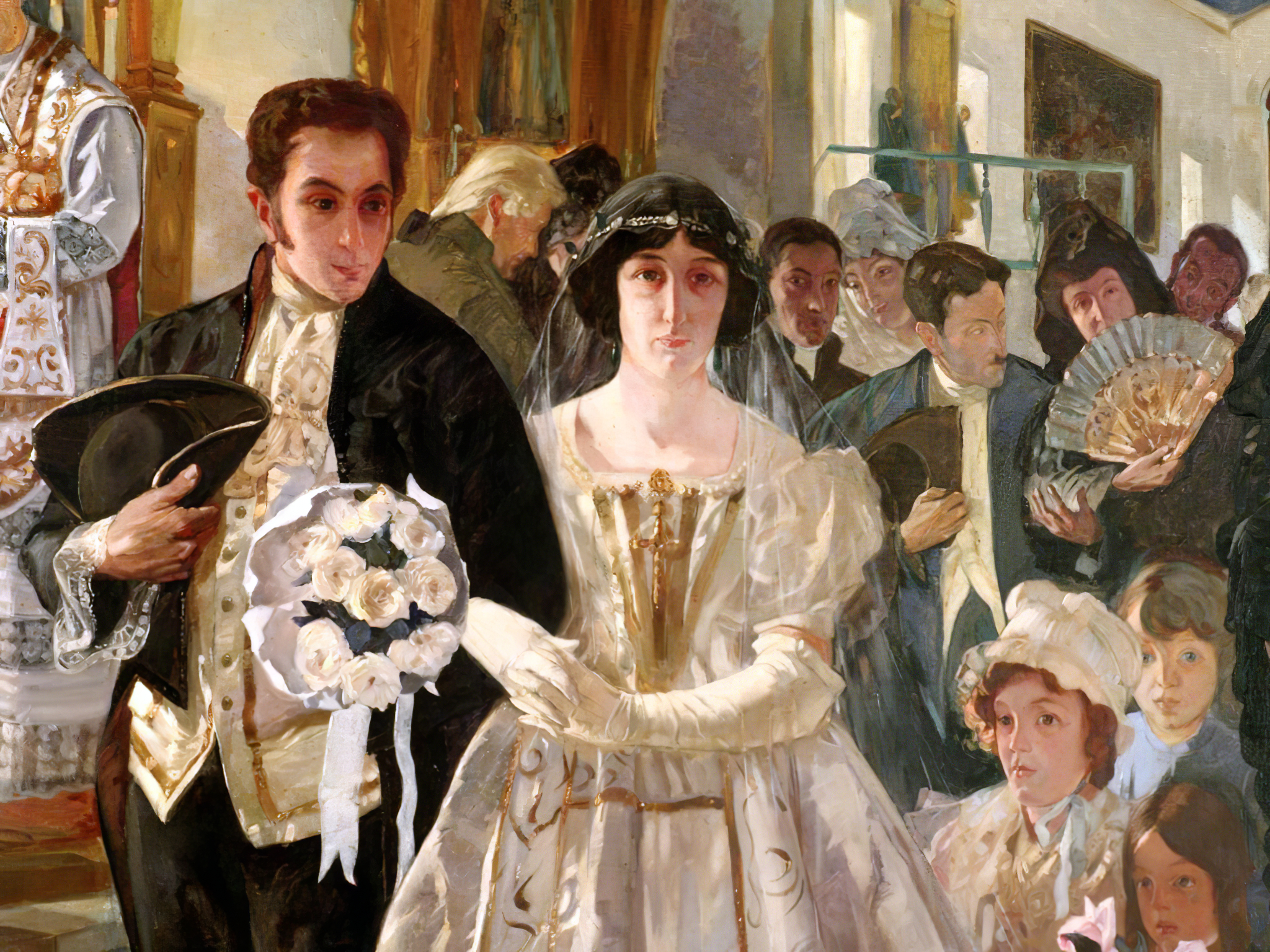
- Wedding of Bolívar and María Teresa Rodríguez del Toro Alayza
- Born: María Teresa Josefa Antonia Joaquina Rodríguez del Toro Alayza; October 15, 1781; Madrid, Spain
- Died: January 22, 1803 (aged 21); Caracas, Captaincy General of Venezuela, Spanish Empire
- Cause of death: Yellow fever and Malaria
- Resting place: Metropolitan Cathedral of Saint Anne
- Spouse: Simón Bolívar (m. 1802; died 1803)
- Parent(s): Benita de Alayza Medrano; Bernardo Rodríguez del Toro Ascanio

María Teresa Josefa Antonia Joaquina Rodríguez del Toro Alayza (Note: Alternatively spelled 'Alaysa' or 'Alaiza') (15 October 1781 – 22 January 1803), was the Spanish-born wife of Simón Bolívar. After only two years of engagement and eight months of marriage, she died after contracting yellow fever at 21 years of age. Bolívar swore and kept his promise to never remarry. According to historians, and to Bolívar himself, her death was a turning point in his life that put him in the path to become the liberator of six Hispanic American nations and the forefather of the Hispanic American integration process.

== Biography ==
María Teresa was the only daughter of Bernardo Rodríguez del Toro y Ascanio, born in Caracas, Venezuela in the heart of a family with origins in Teror, Canary Islands, and Benita de Alayza Medrano, from Valladolid, Spain. She was born in Madrid on 15 October 1781, during the reign of Charles III. María Teresa was deeply linked to Caraquenian society. Her father was the son of the second Marquess del Toro, Francisco Rodríguez del Toro e Isturiz (Governor and Captain General of the Province of Venezuela), and brother of the third Marquess, Sebastián Rodríguez del Toro y Ascanio (Major of Caracas), whose title was inherited by María Teresa's first cousin Francisco Rodríguez del Toro (who would become the first Commander in Chief of Venezuela's independence army). By her mother's side, María Teresa was a niece of the Marquess of Inicio and Count of Rebolledo. Upon her mother's death, María Teresa, though of a young age, took care of her brothers and helped her father and her cousin, Pedro Rodríguez del Toro, in matters related to the administration of goods and haciendas. Various studies and biographies gloss the recreation of the myth of María Teresa:

To date no portraits of her have appeared, and consequently her few images are entirely the figment of the artists' imagination, who were apparently unaware of the general description of her physical appearance that implied a strong resemblance to her light-eyed first cousin, usually blue or greenish. The aforementioned resemblance with her cousin María del Pilar also leads us to think of her as blonde or of fair brown hair.

— Rafael L. Fuentes Carvallo,

=== Relationship with Simón Bolívar ===
María Teresa met Simón Bolívar in Madrid in 1800. Bolívar had been sent to Spain at the age of 17 to continue his studies. Bolívar was living at the time at the residence of the Marquess de Ustariz, Jerónimo de Ustáriz y Tovar, whom Bolívar called his "tutor". There he met María Teresa, who was two years his elder, and with whom he was related throughout various family lines. In August 1800, María Teresa accepted Bolívar's courtship, who described her as "a jewel without defects, valuable without calculation." María Teresa's father took his daughter to Bilbao and a short while later, in March 1801, Bolívar also moved to that city, and then to Paris.

On 5 April 1802, upon returning to Spain, Bolívar proposed formally to María Teresa. It is speculated that María Teresa's father, appeased by the formal engagement, and added to the value of Bolívar's estate at 200,000 duros, gave his permission and blessing to the couple. Bolívar proposed to María Teresa that they would marry that same year at the Port of A Coruña. Shortly after, on 30 March 1802, Bolívar granted Pedro Rodríguez del Toro the power of attorney to subscribe in his name the marriage contract. In consideration of "her distinguished birth, her virginity, her personal qualities" and her disposition to leave Spain to accompany Bolívar, his lawyers placed a value on María Teresa of 100,000 reales, approximately a tenth of Bolívar's fortune.

=== Wedding ===
After having obtained permission from the king and the habitual ecclesiastical admonitions to do so, they married in Madrid on Wednesday, 26 May 1802, in the now-demolished church of San José on the corner of the Libertad and Gravina streets, and which is often confused with the church of the same name located on Alcalá street, where the parish of San José was transferred to in 1838. (Note: Due to this transfer of the parish and its documentary archive, the new temple has a commemorative plaque on its façade that claims to have been the space where the nuptial union took place, although in reality it was never like that. This is a historical error since according to official records, the marriage occurred in the old Parish Church of San José, which was, as has been said, in the current Gravina street, corner of Góngora, where, also, a small plaque between two windows recalls that the temple that united Simón Bolívar and María Teresa de Rodríguez del Toro in 1802 stood on that place.) The marriage certificate reads as follows:

In the town of Madrid on the twenty-sixth day of the month of May of one thousand eight hundred and two, in the Parish Church of San Jose, I, Mr. Isidro Bonifacio Romano, Senior Lieutenant of the Cure of the same, having proceeded with the dispatch of Mr. Dr. Juan Bautista of Expeleta, Pro. Vicario Ecco. Of this referred town and its party. Given in the twentieth of the same month and year, countersigned by Diego Alonso Martín, his notary, which shows that the three reprimands from the Sto. Council of Trent, for the just causes that concurred for it; received the just consents; After asking the other questions and necessary requirements and not having resulted in any impediment, I married in Ecclesial Facie, by words of the present that make Don Simón Bolívar, a native of the city and Bishopric of Caracas in America, son of Don Juan Vicente Bolívar and his legitimated wife Doña María de la Concepción Palacios (now deceased) with Doña María Teresa Rodríguez del Toro, a native of this aforementioned town, daughter of Don Bernardo Rodríguez del Toro y Ascanio and Doña Benita Alaiza Medrano (now deceased) preceded the necessary requirements, Don Pedro Rodríguez del Toro, Mr. Marqués de Inicio and others were present as witnesses, together I watched them and gave the nuptial blessings according to the ritual and signed it. Don Isidro Bonifacio Romano.

Twenty days later, the couple moved to La Coruña. On 15 June 1802, the recently married couple left to Caracas, where they arrived the 12 July at La Guaira. There María Teresa was welcomed not only by Bolívar's family, but by her own Rodríguez del Toro relatives. After a short stay in Caracas, at the Casa del Vínculo y del Retorno, located on a corner of the Caracas Plaza Mayor, today named Bolívar Square, they moved to Bolívar's estate in San Mateo. A few months later, María Teresa fell sick to "malign fevers," identified indistinctly in the present day as yellow fever or paludism. The couple then returned to the Casa del Vínculo in Caracas, where she died on 22 January 1803, after eight months of marriage and two years of engagement.

=== Death and promise ===
After having lost his parents as a child, and having lived a lonely childhood, María Teresa represented for Bolívar a last and definitive attempt to lay down emotional roots, an attempt marked by tragedy. The pain caused by this unexpected and premature death would lead Bolívar to avoid any close emotional bond in the future.

Bolívar, in 1828, described with these words the emotional and affective situation in which he found himself when in 1802 he returned to Venezuela:«Then my head was full of the fumes of the most violent love and not of political ideas ». The same he affirms in other testimonies. For example, in a letter to his friend Pedro Joseph Dehollain he mentioned that when he married, he became a "happy entity who joyfully sang the height of his happiness with the possession of his Teresa." Teresa was the affective center of her husband's life. He had gone through the death of his father and then his mother and his grandfather. Teresa was the fundamental human bond with whom he hoped to share life, dreams, projects. That is why he explained to Perú de la Croix: "I loved my wife very much." Teresa's disappearance had to cause a deep crisis: "I have lost her and with it her sweet life." "Pain for a single moment leaves me no consolation to seek", "deplorable and sad fate to which I am condemned." The state he was in was pathetic. He was submerged in a deep sadness and his character changed.

— Tomás Polanco Alcántara, Simón Bolívar, Essay of Biographical Interpretation Through his Documents

The oath of not remarrying again that Bolívar pronounced at that time is considered by his biographers as a rebellious act against the pain derived from the unconditional surrender of his emotional defenses. Even though he would have many lovers in the future, he faithfully fulfilled his promise.

The unexpected death of María Teresa is a hard and decisive blow in Bolívar's life that plunges him into the deepest pain ... Again he runs into misfortune and knows how to appeal to his deep energy to face it and move on. In the future, though, he will not give pure and permanent love to any woman, neither will any of his lovers bind him permanently.

— Luis José Silva Luongo, Bolívar, Everyone's Inheritance,

Bolívar's desperation led to fears that he would take his life. Bolívar, however, made a second trip to Europe to mitigate his immense grief. In Madrid he had a moving reunion with his father-in-law, Bernardo, which Bolívar would always remember. In company of María Teresa's first cousin Fernando Rodríguez del Toro, Bolívar travelled to Paris, where he came into contact with his old teacher Simón Rodríguez. This encounter would be of vital importance to Bolívar's life since Rodríguez, observing the anguish of his former disciple, guided him into political interests as a way to overcome the void left by María Teresa's death. Per his own words, this would lead him to follow "Mars' chariot" instead of "Ceres' plow." In 1828, analyzing the influence his wife's death had on him, Bolívar confesses:

If I had not been a widower, perhaps my life would have been different; I would not be General Bolívar or the Liberator, although I agree that my genius was not to be mayor of San Mateo.

— Simón Bolívar,

In relation to María Teresa's death the eminent Spanish biographer Salvador de Madariaga wrote:

This sudden end of the retired and personal life of a twenty-one-year-old girl has perhaps been one of the key events in the history of the New World.

— Salvador de Madariaga, Bolívar,

=== Resting place ===
Upon her death, María Teresa's remains were buried in the Bolívar family pantheon at the Caracas Cathedral with Bolívar's parents and forebears. When Bolívar's remains were repatriated from Santa Marta, Colombia, in December 1842, they were buried right next to his wife's. There they remained for 34 years until 28 October 1876, until when Bolivar's body was transferred to the National Pantheon. Simultaneously, a series of sculptures were started for María Teresa and Bolívar's parents, which would be located in the Holy Trinity Chapel in the Metropolitan Cathedral of Caracas. These were entrusted to Italian sculpturist Pietro Tenerani. In 1930 an allegorical sculpture by Victorio Macho showing Bolívar protecting his wife and parents was added to the monument.

== Portrayals in high and popular culture ==
In French composer Darius Milhaud's opera Bolívar, María Teresa is depicted as the hero's big love, whose soul awaits Bolívar when he dies at the end of the final act.

María Teresa and Bolívar's relationship was portrayed by María Valverde and Edgar Ramírez in Alberto Arvelo's 2013 film The Liberator.

In the fourth episode of the third season of the Spanish TV series, El Ministerio del Tiempo, Bolívar is aided by the time-travelling agents to find María Teresa. This is considered fundamental to trigger the series of events that would make Bolívar the Liberator of South America.

The relationship is also portrayed by the joint Netflix-Caracol Television series Bolívar with Irene Esser and José Ramón Barreto in the roles of María Teresa and Simón Bolívar.
