= Río Caribe =

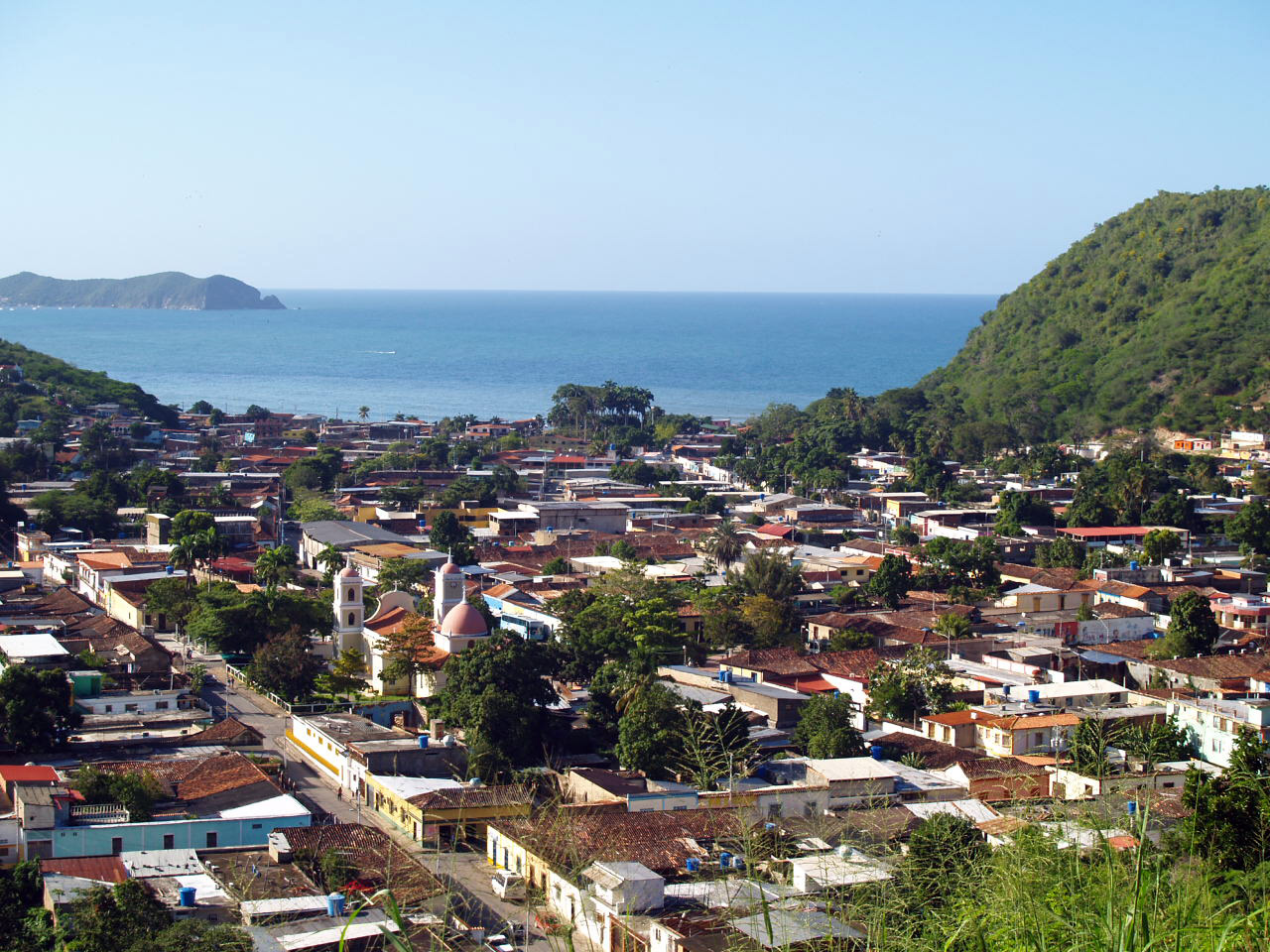

- Location within Venezuela
- Coordinates: 10°42′3″N 63°6′31″W
- Country: Venezuela
- States: Sucre
- Founded: 1713

Population (2001)
  - Total: 13,667
  - Demonym: riocaribero(a)
- Time zone: UTC-04:30 (VST)
  - Summer (DST): UTC-04:30 (not observed)

Río Caribe is a fishing town located 22 kilometers (about 14 miles) from Carúpano, Sucre State, in Eastern Venezuela. It is the capital city of the Arismendi municipality.

== History ==
Río Caribe was founded on 1713 with the name of San Miguel de Río Caribe. The town was the second establishment of the Spaniards in the Sucre State. During the 19th century, it received many immigrants from Italy and Corsica.

== Life ==
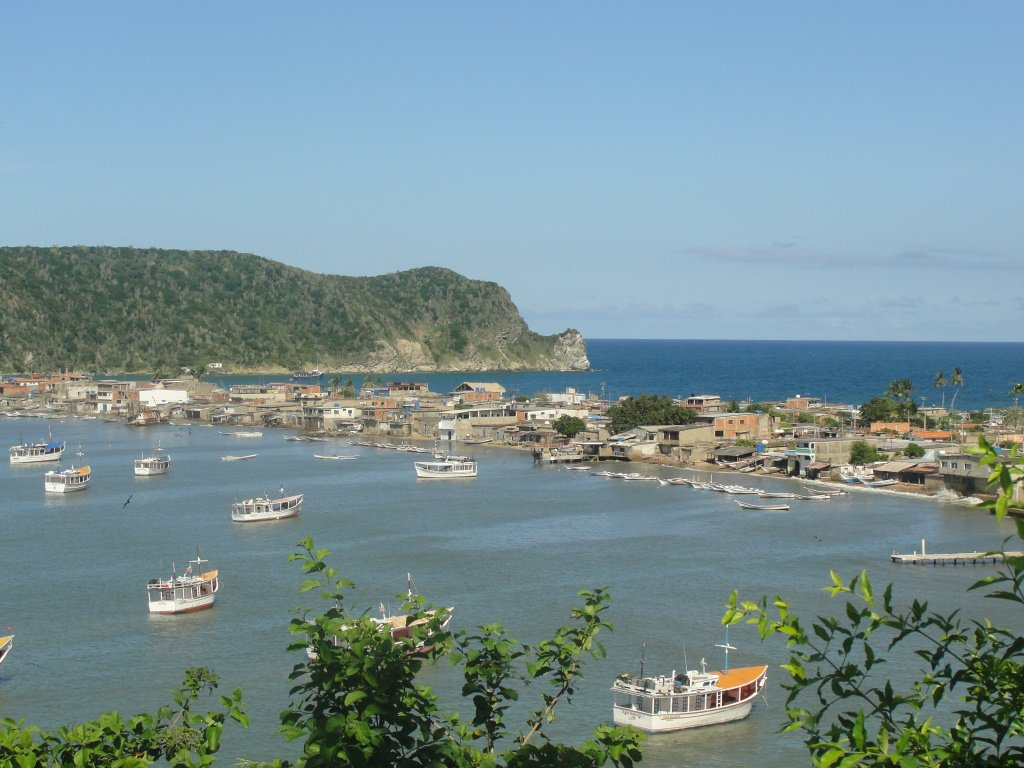
View of the beach.

Río Caribe has a port of national and international cabotage, that allows the development of a thriving fishing industry, including seafood processing and packing. Also, it has commercial and banking facilities as well as other amenities for tourists and visitors. The town serves as point of entry to the region beautiful beaches—such as Playa Medina and Playa Pui Pui.

Río Caribe is called by some the City of the Masters of Cacao, because of the nearby Hacienda Agua Santa. This old plantation produces one of the best cocoa beans of the country, well known both nationally and internationally. Also, the Hacienda offers guided visits where tourists can observe the whole production process, from the plantation to the drying of cacao. These guided visits usually culminate with the tasting of a chocolate prepared in the same property. In addition to cacao, the region also produces banana and maize.

The region is also rich in natural gas and light petroleum reserves, with an important one located about 30 kilometers (some 19 miles) off its shores.

== Landmarks ==
The Church of Río Caribe represents one of the best examples of Spanish Colonial architecture. It was erected in 1717 and reconstructed in 1919. Also, the town has preserved most of its Spanish colonial houses, many of them built during the late 19th century.

Other important landmarks are found in nearby locations, such as the chapels of El Calvario and San Miguel Arcángel.

== Notable people ==
Río Caribe is the hometown of Venezuelan Major League Baseball relief pitcher Germán González, who played for the Minnesota Twins during the 1988 and 1989 seasons and Irene Esser, Miss Venezuela 2011.

== See also ==
- Venezuela
- Sucre State
- Germán González
- Irene Esser
