= Los Medallistas =

- Genre: Drama
- Created by: César Augusto Betancur
- Written by: Yanira Sánchez; Mayra Henao; Elena Valencia
- Directed by: Luis Orjuela Cortes; Juan Carlos Vásquez; Mónica Cifuentes
- Starring: José Ramón Barreto; Paola Valencia; Mayra Luna
- Composer: Samuel Lizarralde G.
- Country of origin: Colombia
- Original language: Spanish
- No. of seasons: 1
- No. of episodes: 64

Production
- Executive producer: Juan Carlos Villamizar Delgado
- Editor: José Luis Oróstegui
- Production company: Caracol Televisión

Original release
- Network: Caracol
- Release: 8 February – 15 May 2023

Los Medallistas (English title: Golden Dreams) is a Colombian drama television series produced Caracol Televisión that aired from 8 February 2023 to 15 May 2023. The show is produced by Juan Carlos Villamizar, and directed by Luis Orjuela, Juan Carlos Vásquez, and Mónica Cifuentes. The series is based on real events about the lives of three athletes who achieved Olympic Glory. It stars José Ramón Barreto, Paola Valencia, and Mayra Luna.

== Plot ==
The series follows the lives, struggles and achievements of Yuri Alvear (Mayra Luna), Ingrit Valencia (Paola Valencia) and Óscar Muñoz (José Ramón Barreto), three Olympic medalists born in different regions of Colombia and from families of limited economic resources.

== Cast ==
- José Ramón Barreto as Óscar Muñoz
- Paola Valencia as Ingrit Valencia
- Mayra Luna as Yuri Alvear
- Víctor Hugo Trespalacios
- Yeimy Paola Vargas
- Julio Pachón
- Indhira Serrano as Gabriela Valencia
- Nancy Murillo
- Leo Sosa Fuentes
- Karoll Márquez
- Gary Forero
- Dubán Prado
- Diana Herrera
- Felipe Londoño as Wilson Muñoz

== Production ==
The production of the series revolves around the 2020 Summer Olympics, and was confirmed on 15 October 2019. Filming of the series concluded on 21 December 2019.

== Ratings ==
Season	Timeslot (COT)	Episodes	First aired		Last aired		Avg. viewers (in points)
Season	Timeslot (COT)	Episodes	Date	Viewers (in points)	Date	Viewers (in points)	Avg. viewers (in points)
1	Mon–Fri 10:30 p.m.	31	8 February 2023	N/A	15 May 2023	4.2	3.9

== Episodes ==
No.	Title	Original release date	Colombia viewers (Rating points)
1	"Los Medallistas empiezan a afrontar los primeros problemas de sus vidas"	8 February 2023	N/A
2	"Los Medallistas reafirman sus pasiones y empiezan a tener relevancia en sus deportes"	9 February 2023	3.8
3	"Los Medallistas enfrentan grandes batallas en sus vidas personales"	10 February 2023	4.2
4	"El amor empieza a tener efectos y consecuencias en la vida de Íngrit, Óscar y Yuri"	13 February 2023	4.2
5	"Empiezan a aparecer piedras en el camino, pero también victorias para Ingrit, Oscar y Yuri"	14 February 2023	4.1
6	"Julio puede llevar a Ingrit Valencia a tomar malas decisiones"	15 February 2023	N/A
7	"Ingrit Valencia se entera que está embarazada y decide renunciar a todo"	16 February 2023	4.0
8	"Yuri Alvear y Óscar Muñoz tienen un nuevo encuentro con el amor"	17 February 2023	4.0
9	"Los Medallistas reciben golpes bajos que los harán replantearse la vida"	20 February 2023	3.6
10	"Los Medallistas deben afrontar nuevos retos en sus vidas, ¿soportarán la presión?"	21 February 2023	4.0
11	"Los Medallistas reciben buenas noticias, pero la felicidad no dura mucho"	22 February 2023	3.8
12	"Los Medallistas destacan al competir, pero sus vidas personales no parecen mejorar"	23 February 2023	4.1
13	"Ingrit recibe una oferta para participar en peleas clandestinas"	24 February 2023	3.6
14	"Óscar Muñoz se ve envuelto en un problema con la justicia"	27 February 2023	4.1
15	"¿Yuri Alvear intenta darle una nueva oportunidad al matrimonio?"	28 February 2023	3.5
16	"Óscar Muñoz hace su mejor esfuerzo en competencia a pesar de su problema de salud"	1 March 2023	3.9
17	"Yuri Alvear debe elegir entre su familia y su futuro en el deporte"	2 March 2023	4.0
18	"¿Óscar Muñoz por fin tendrá suerte en el amor?"	3 March 2023	4.0
19	"Julio no se rinde en su intento de recuperar a Ingrit, pero ella descubrirá la verdad"	6 March 2023	N/A
20	"Yuri mejora su relación con la profesora, pero su hermano sufre un accidente"	7 March 2023	N/A
21	"Ingrit Valencia se da nuevamente una oportunidad en el amor con el profesor Saúl, pero no todo es color de rosa"	8 March 2023	3.8
22	"Óscar Muñoz es sorprendido por su familia, pero Oliva arruina todo"	9 March 2023	N/A
23	"Yuri Alvear e Ingrit Valencia se conocen: una de ellas demuestra su admiración"	10 March 2023	N/A
24	"Ingrit Valencia y Óscar Muñoz se esfuerzan por demostrar su talento"	13 March 2023	N/A
25	"Ingrit Valencia recibe una gran noticia, pero su mamá podría estar en problemas legales"	14 March 2023	4.4
26	"Yuri Alvear se lesiona gravemente una rodilla y su futuro deportivo está en peligro"	15 March 2023	4.0
27	"El Profesor Marín, Ingrit y Lady son víctimas de un robo durante su viaje a Panamá"	16 March 2023	N/A
28	"Ingrit Valencia y el profesor deben irse del hotel, pero encuentran una solución"	17 March 2023	N/A
29	"Yuri Alvear se rehúsa a darle más ventaja a sus oponentes deportivos"	21 March 2023	N/A
30	"¿Ingrit Valencia acepta vivir de nuevo con Julio en la casa de sus padres?"	23 March 2023	N/A
31	"Los Medallistas llegan a los Juegos Interamericanos de Guadalajara a luchar por sus sueños"	24 March 2023	N/A
32	"Otilio debe confesarle a Francy que apostó toda la prima por la competencia de su hijo"	27 March 2023	N/A
33	"Pastor intenta contarle a Gabriela la situación que está ocurriendo con Beatriz, pero ella lo interrumpe"	28 March 2023	N/A
34	"Ingrit Valencia logra mejorar su relación con el reportero deportivo"	29 March 2023	3.9
35	"Pastor busca desesperadamente la ayuda de Ingrit Valencia"	30 March 2023	N/A
36	"Saúl Marín le propone matrimonio a Ingrit Valencia, ¿aceptará?"	31 March 2023	N/A
37	"Yuri Alvear y Fernanda son sorprendidas por amores del pasado"	3 April 2023	3.9
38	"Los Medallistas empiezan una nueva etapa, pero la vida los sorprende"	4 April 2023	N/A
39	"Norbey y Arnoldo se encuentran en graves problemas"	5 April 2023	N/A
40	"Yuri Alvear le asegura a Sabrina que no tiene tiempo para pensar en Manuel"	10 April 2023	3.5
41	"Fernanda le pide a Óscar Muñoz que regrese a Valledupar"	11 April 2023	N/A
42	"Aunque está en Valledupar, Óscar Muñoz no para de pensar en Fernanda"	12 April 2023	N/A
43	"Ingrit Valencia descubre que la vida de Ricky está en grave peligro"	13 April 2023	N/A
44	"Ingrit Valencia y Leidy viven uno de los lutos más grandes de sus vidas"	14 April 2023	3.7
45	"Yuri Alvear es retenida por las mujeres de la cárcel de Jamundí"	17 April 2023	N/A
46	"Yuri Alvear es liberada al finalizar el motín que se armó en la cárcel"	18 April 2023	N/A
47	"El profesor Coral le advierte a Óscar que Fernanda lo está controlando"	19 April 2023	N/A
48	"Julio sigue luchando por reconquistar a Ingrit Valencia"	20 April 2023	3.6
49	"Óscar Muñoz y Yuri Alvear ponen en peligro su rendimiento en las competencias"	21 April 2023	N/A
50	"Yuri Alvear y Óscar Muñoz se encuentran y hablan de sus problemas personales y las competencias"	24 April 2023	N/A
51	"Yuri Alvear disputa, en Londres, un combate que podría darle una medalla olímpica"	25 April 2023	N/A
52	"Óscar Muñoz logra ganarse una medalla en los Juegos Olímpicos de Londres 2012"	26 April 2023	N/A
53	"Yuri Alvear se casa con Juan, pero nada es color de rosa"	27 April 2023	N/A
54	"La familia de Yuri Alvear recibe una maravillosa noticia"	28 April 2023	3.5
55	"Óscar Muñoz le pide a Estefanía que deje de acosarlo"	2 May 2023	N/A
56	"Yuri Alvear se enfrenta a su esposo y Óscar debe hacerle frente al acoso de Stephany"	3 May 2023	4.0
57	"Óscar Muñoz logra aclarar la situación con la mamá de Stefanía"	4 May 2023	N/A
58	"Ingrit Valencia se reencuentra con Yuri y debe cuidar la salud de su mamá"	5 May 2023	3.9
59	"Yuri Alvear no recibe buenas noticias durante su estadía en Rusia"	8 May 2023	N/A
60	"Yuri Alvear habla con su familia y les dice que se va a separar de Juan"	9 May 2023	3.7
61	"Los Medallistas triunfan en Veracruz, pero sus vidas siguen teniendo líos"	10 May 2023	3.7
62	"Ingrit Valencia afronta diversos problemas en su vida personal, pero victorias en el boxeo"	11 May 2023	N/A
63	"Los Medallistas irán a Brasil, pero antes se despiden de sus familias y recuerdan sus infancias"	12 May 2023	4.0
64	"Ingrit Valencia, Óscar Muñoz y Yuri Alvear dan la pelea de la vida para cumplir sus sueños"	15 May 2023	4.2
