= BBC Mundo =

Spanish-language news service

- Type: Website
- Country: United Kingdom
- Availability: Worldwide
- Endowment: Foreign and Commonwealth Office, UK
- Owner: BBC
- Key people: Julia Zapata
- Launch date: 1938
- Official website: www.bbc.com/mundo

BBC Mundo (Spanish for BBC World), previously known as the BBC Latin American Service, is part of the BBC World Service's foreign language output, one of 40 languages it provides.

== History ==
The first BBC broadcast in Spanish took place on 14 March 1938, when the BBC's Latin American Service (el Servicio Latinoamericano de la BBC) was launched, initially airing 15-minute radio transmissions in Spanish and Portuguese. The service was launched in response to broadcasts by the governments of Nazi Germany and fascist Italy, which had begun a strong propaganda campaign aimed at Latin America. Lord John Reith, Director-General of the BBC, made a speech on the day to welcome the Spanish-speaking listeners.

Following the installation of new transmitters, the service was extended to three, and later to four, hours a day. The BBC also arranged rebroadcasts by a number of local stations across Latin America. Chilean-born pianist and composer Norman Fraser was responsible for music programming until 1943.

The Mexican writer Elena Poniatowska remembers how her mother told her about her trust in the BBC: "We lived in México and she looked frenetically for news about the war because my father was at the frontline". The first Spanish service journalists remembered those times as really tough. They witnessed the destruction of their studio, then in Broadcasting House (later the service was moved to Bush House along with BBC's other language services, where it stayed until 2012).

When World War II began, the BBC Latin American Service was important in countering propaganda from Axis Power radio networks. The BBC broadcast news and information in favour of the Allies, along with information about the situation of the occupied countries under Nazi Germany, and the persecution of Europe's Jewish population.

After the war, the Latin American service's broadcasts expanded, and features and arts programming returned. One such notable addition was Carrusel Londinense, with live orchestras, singers, and comedians entertaining the audience. Radio dramas were also a success — e.g., the adaptation of Cervantes' Don Quixote de La Mancha.

The next decades were shaped by news about the Cold War, the Cuban Revolution and the Cuban Missile Crisis, and the race for space supremacy. However, the BBC's Spanish-language radio also gave a lot of prominence to culture thanks to journalists such as Juan Peirano, Eduardo de Benito, Julio García, and Jackie Richards.

Shortwave radio transmissions became vital to Latin America during the 1970s when most of the countries in the region were under military rule. Many people tuned in to the BBC during times of political crisis and military coups, as in Chile in the aftermath of September 1973.

== Falklands War and after ==
The BBC Latin American Service's credibility was put in the spotlight when the UK went to war with Argentina over the Falkland/Malvinas Islands. Despite the fact that BBC World Service was funded by the British Foreign Office, BBC journalists did their best to deliver unbiased coverage of the conflict, reporting Argentine statements and claims without comment.

The even-handed approach of the BBC had its critics at home — including the government. The BBC defended its position by declaring, for example, that "it is not the BBC's role to boost British troops' morale", and that "the widow in Portsmouth is no different from the widow of Buenos Aires".

When the British government took control of one BBC transmitter on Ascension Island to broadcast the propagandist Radio Atlántico del Sur, "the BBC reacted and warned people, especially its audience in Argentina, that English propaganda was about to broadcast instead of impartial information", remembers the Argentine writer Osvaldo Soriano.

The Argentine government tried to interfere with the BBC's shortwave transmissions, jamming them and issuing a decree forbidding radio stations in Argentina to contact the BBC's Latin American Service for interviews.

The BBC's service in Spanish expanded during the 1990s when satellite technologies allowed more access to the service across the continent. Interactive programmes flourished, among them El Circuito, which broadcast opinions and messages of thousands of listeners and was a source of great anecdotes.

The spread of satellite transmissions as well as the emergence of the web and the competition with television channels resulted in the decline of shortwave broadcasting in the region. The BBC's Spanish-language radio programmes such as El Circuito, Enfoque, Estudio Abierto, Vía Libre, Fútbol Europa, and Notas de Jazz became available for listening across Latin America via local radio stations. The BBC's Spanish-language news website was created.

== BBC Mundo ==
On 10 October 2005, the BBC Latin American Service officially changed its name to BBC Mundo, the BBC's service for the Spanish-speaking world. It is part of BBC World Service. The website offers news, information, and analysis in text, audio, and video.

BBC Mundo has its headquarters on the fifth floor of the BBC's New Broadcasting House in London. The BBC's Spanish service also has a newsroom in Miami, offices in Buenos Aires and México City, and reporters in Washington DC, Los Angeles, Havana, Caracas, Bogotá, Santiago, Quito, Lima and Madrid. BBC Mundo benefits from the international newsgathering strength of the BBC, which has journalists in more places than any other international news broadcaster.

The service's website was born in 1999 as a debate site – a single page dedicated to encouraging a weekly discussion of specific subjects on the global news agenda.

"There were only two of us working on the site at the time, the site was neither supposed to nor able to reflect the changing news. The Clinton/Lewinski scandal hit in the middle of a week where the page was encouraging debate on a totally different topic, highlighting beautifully how extremely difficult it is to not update a BBC-branded site continuously and retain credibility", remembers Julia Zapata, first editor of the site and later Head of BBC Mundo until 2009.

The BBC then decided to allocate funding for 24/7 news websites in Spanish, Russian, Chinese, and Arabic. The first major wave of change involved recruitment, training, and staffing and resulted in the creation of the site indexes needed to deliver full 24/7 region-specific, interactive, and multimedia coverage.

"The next stage were years of consolidation, editorial growth and creative experimentation. This culminated with the combined World Service language websites winning a 2007 Webby Award, and BBC Mundo winning the prestigious Ortega y Gasset Online Journalism award in 2007", said Zapata. However, less than a month after winning the award, a major budget cut across the World Service was announced. As a result, BBC Mundo radio broadcasts were reduced. According to Julia Zapata, one of the immediate benefits of the 2007 budget cuts "was to allow [BBC Mundo] to focus completely on the website and produce high-impact output such as the NarcoMéxico special, which won two BBC Global News awards for multimedia production in 2008". Radio broadcasts ceased in 2011.

From 2012, BBC Mundo was headed by Hernando Alvarez who took over from Hilary Bishop. He also later became Head of the Americas Hub of BBC World Service. Today, bbcmundo.com has a news philosophy based on creative angles and thorough analysis, which complement the information its audience receives in their own countries.

Alvarez says that one of the key distinguishing features of BBC Mundo is "the range of its editorial remit, where technology, science, health, art, and culture are treated with the same relevance as current-affairs stories. Whatever is the subject of the BBC Mundo coverage, it challenges pre-conceptions and gets to the core of the issue".

The website has syndication partnerships with major news websites across Latin America: MSN portals (Latam, Argentina, Chile, Peru, Colombia, Costa Rica, Latino USA and Prodigy Mexico), TERRA portals (Mexico, USA Latino, Argentina, Chile, Peru, Colombia, Spain), and BING portals (Mexico, Latam, Argentina, Chile, Peru, Colombia, Spain, Latino USA); and prominent newspapers, magazines and websites such as El Comercio (Peru), La Tercera (Chile), La Nacion (Argentina), El Nacional (Venezuela), Semana (Colombia), Animal P (Mexico), El Mostrador (Chile), Ecuavisa (Ecuador), Caracol (Colombia), Analitica (Venezuela), 24horas.cl (Chile), Noticias24 (Venezuela); and YouTube.

At the beginning of 2014, 15 years after its creation, bbcmundo.com had over 8.5 million monthly unique visitors who read its stories, follow its live texts, watch its videos, and share their comments via its Facebook and Twitter accounts.
