= Irene Esser =

Venezuelan actress, model, and beauty queen

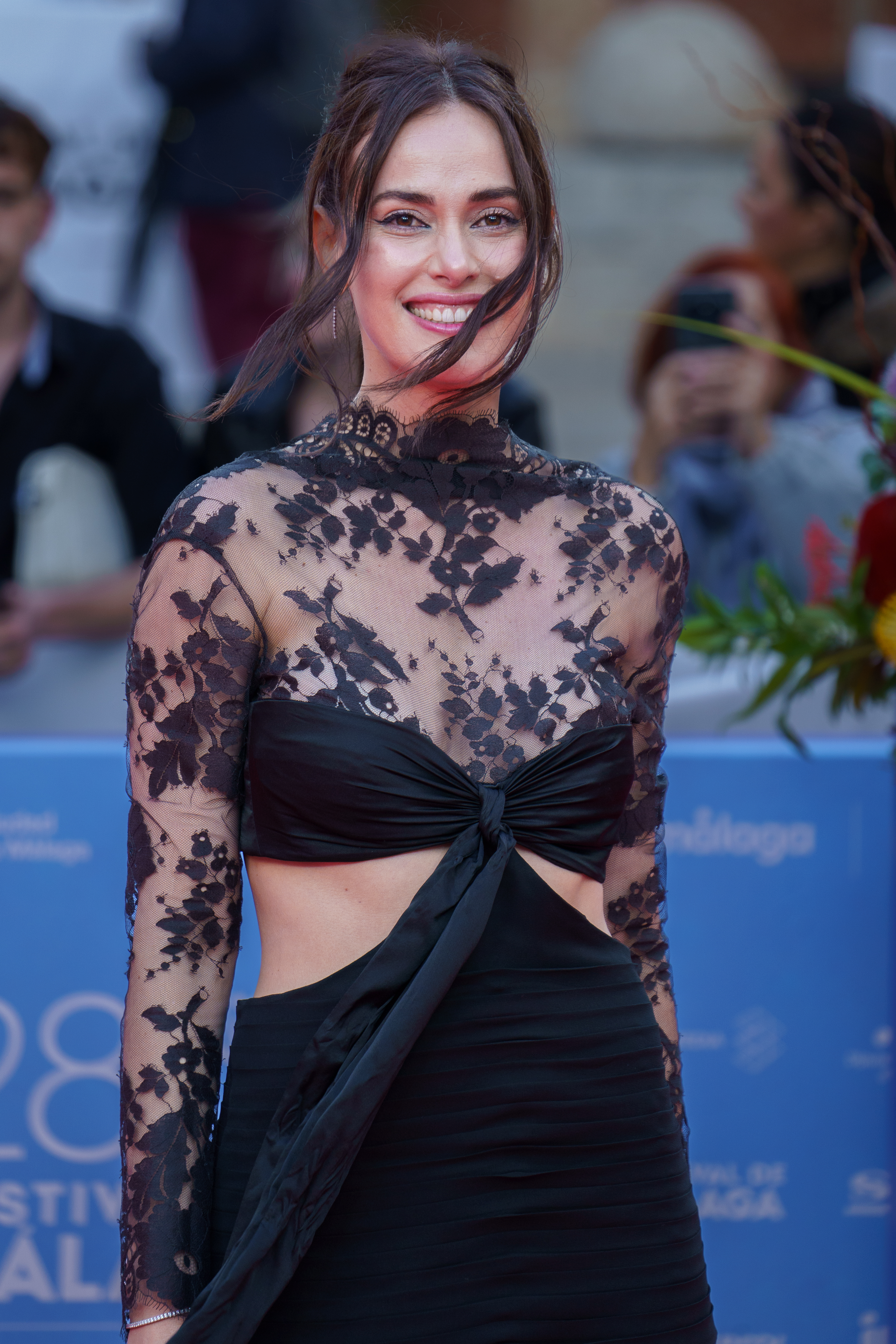
- Esser in 2025
- Born: Irene Sofia Esser Quintero; 20 November 1991 (age 34); Ciudad Guayana, Bolívar, Venezuela
- Height: 1.78 m (5 ft 10 in)
- Beauty pageant titleholder
- Title: Miss Sucre 2011; Miss Venezuela 2011
- Major competitions: Miss Venezuela 2011 (Winner); Miss Universe 2012 (2nd Runner-Up)

Irene Sofía Esser Quintero (born 20 November 1991) is a Venezuelan actress, model and beauty pageant titleholder who was crowned Miss Venezuela 2011. Esser grew up in Río Caribe, Sucre, Venezuela. She represented Venezuela in Miss Universe 2012, finishing as 2nd Runner-Up.

== Personal life ==
Irene Esser was born in the city of Puerto Ordaz, but has studied and lived in the town of Río Caribe, located in the state of Sucre, since she was a little girl. Her father, Billy Esser Bonta, is an important cacao businessman, owner of Hacienda Bukare, founded in 1997. After graduating from "Andres Bello High School" in Carupano, she moved to England, where she took a course at Shrewsbury College.

== Pageantry ==
=== Miss Venezuela 2011 ===
Esser, who stands 1.79 m (5 ft 10 in), competed as Miss Sucre, one of 24 finalists in her country's national beauty pageant Miss Venezuela 2011, held on 15 October 2011 in Caracas, where she obtained the Miss Elegance award and became the third Miss Venezuela winner from Sucre, gaining the right to represent her country in Miss Universe 2012.

=== Miss Universe 2012 ===
Esser represented Venezuela at the Miss Universe 2012 pageant on 19 December 2012, in Las Vegas, Nevada, USA, where she finished as 2nd Runner-Up behind Janine Tugonon (Philippines) and winner Olivia Culpo (USA). She was one of the favorites to win the pageant. However, she faltered during the final question round and finished in third place. She has outdone two prior Miss Venezuela Marelisa Gibson (who failed to place) and Vanessa Gonçalves (who finished in the Top 16).

When asked by judge Diego Boneta "If you could make a new law, what would it be and explain why?", Esser responded:

I think that any leyes (laws) there are in Constitution or in life, are already made. I think that we should have, uh, a straight way to go in our similar, or, eh, in our lives as is this. For example, I'm a surfer, and I think that the best wave that I can take is the wave that I wait for it. So please do our only, eh, law that we can do. Thank you Vegas!

Esser was criticized by media, mocked by Craig Carton, Don Geronimo, Lili Estefan, Perez Hilton, Pablo Ramírez, Raul De Molina, amongst other personalities for her incomprehensible response and a video of her final question and answer became popular on YouTube. Her answer was even compared to Caitlin Upton's infamous response to her final question.

== Filmography ==
In 2013, Irene was cast to star in the Venevisión telenovela titled Corazón Esmeralda alongside Luis Gerónimo Abreu.

Year	Title	Role	Notes
2014	Corazón esmeralda	Beatriz Elena Beltrán	Lead role
2015	Piel salvaje	Camila Espino / Isabel Blanco	Lead role
2019	Bolívar	María Teresa Rodríguez del Toro y Alaysa	Lead role

Awards and achievements
Preceded by (Brazil) Priscila Machado	Miss Universe 2nd Runner-Up; 2012	Succeeded by (Ecuador) Constanza Báez
Preceded by Vanessa Gonçalves	Miss Venezuela; 2011	Succeeded by Gabriela Isler
Preceded by Adriana Kuper	Miss Sucre; 2011	Succeeded by Ingrid Smith
