= Germán González (baseball) =

Venezuelan baseball player (born 1962)

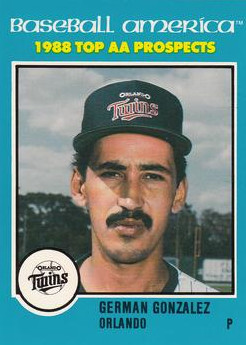
- González in 1988
- Pitcher
- Born: March 7, 1962 (age 64); Rio Caribe, Sucre State, Venezuela
- Batted: Right Threw: Right

MLB debut
- August 5, 1988, for the Minnesota Twins

Last MLB appearance
- September 25, 1989, for the Minnesota Twins

MLB statistics
- Win–loss record: 3–2
- Earned run average: 4.11
- Strikeouts: 44
- Stats at Baseball Reference

Teams
- Minnesota Twins (1988–1989)

Germán José González (born March 7, 1962) is a Venezuelan former Major League Baseball (MLB) relief pitcher.

== Career ==
He played for the Minnesota Twins (1988–89). He batted and threw right-handed.

In a two-season career, González compiled a 3–2 record with 44 strikeouts and a 4.41 ERA in 50.1 innings.

== See also ==
- List of players from Venezuela in Major League Baseball
