= José Ramón Barreto =

Venezuelan actor and singer (born 1991)

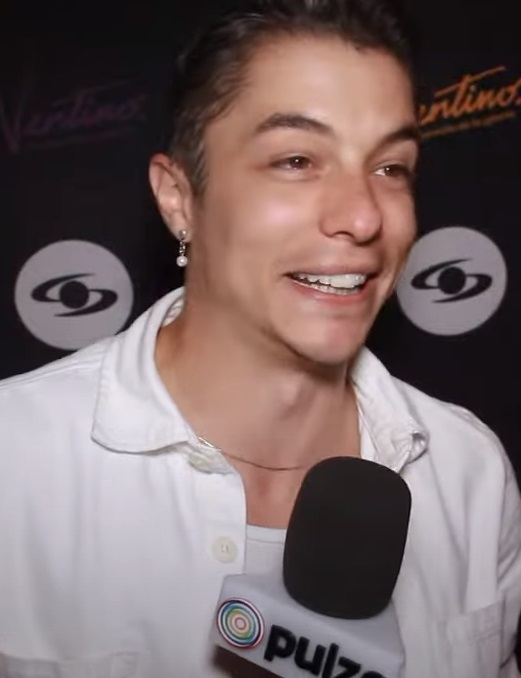
- Barreto in 2023
- Born: José Ramón Barreto Jové; August 2, 1991 (age 35); Caracas, Venezuela
- Other name: JR
- Occupations: Actor, director, singer, dancer
- Years active: 2006–present

José Ramón Barreto (born August 2, 1991 in Caracas, Venezuela), is a Venezuelan actor and singer.

== Filmography ==
=== Film ===
Year	Title	Role	Source
2013	Luisa		
2023	Simón	Antonio	
2023	Retratos Del Exilio		
2024	Visceral	Jhon	
2024	Vuelve a la vida		
2025	Un Viaje De Pelicula	Victor	
2027	La Teoria Di Grace	Santiago	

=== Television ===
Year	Title	Role	Source
2006	Túkiti, crecí de una	Jefferson	
2008	La trepadora	Chabeto	
2009	Calle luna, Calle sol	Francisco José Rodríguez	
2010–11	La Banda	Jhonny	
2011	El árbol de Gabriel	Deibis Arriagae	
2014	Corazón esmeralda	Miguel Blanco	
2015–16	A puro corazón	Alejandro Rodríguez	
2017	Para verte mejor	Guillermo Luis	
2019	Bolívar	Simón Bolívar	
2019	Sharon la Hechicera	Ab. Daniel Segale	
2022	Arelys Henao: Canto para no llorar	Wilfredo Hurtado	
2023	Los Medallistas	Óscar Muñoz	
2023	Ventino: El precio de la gloria	Manolo Cano	
2026	Doc	Dr. José Ramos	
