= Para verte mejor =

Television series

- Genre: Telenovela
- Created by: Mónica Montañes
- Written by: Mónica Montañes; Doris Seguí; Gerardo Blanco; María Isoliett Iglesias
- Directed by: Yuri Delgado
- Starring: Michelle de Andrade; José Ramón Barreto; Luis Gerónimo Abreu
- Opening theme: "Para verte mejor" by Grupo Allián
- Country of origin: Venezuela
- Original language: Spanish
- No. of episodes: 93

Production
- Executive producer: Sandra Riobóo
- Producer: Romina Peña
- Production locations: Caracas, Venezuela
- Camera setup: Multi-camera
- Production company: Venevisión

Original release
- Network: Venevisión
- Release: July 25 – December 5, 2017

Related
- Tres veces Ana

Para verte mejor is a Venezuelan telenovela written by Mónica Montañes and produced by Sandra Riobóo for Venevisión. The series is starring Michelle de Andrade as Ana, José Ramón Barreto as Guillermo and Luis Gerónimo Abreu as Onofre. It premiered on July 25, 2017 and ended on December 5, 2017.

== Plot ==
Several families move into an apartment building with their illusions, fears and secrets. Unbeknownst to the residents, their seemingly friendly neighbour, Onofre Villahermosa, is actually a criminal and a murderer who has installed hidden cameras throughout the building to monitor and manipulate the residents, while trying to ensure no one discovers his identity.

Several years before, Ana de los Ángeles had a chance encounter with Guillermo who helped to heal her pet dog after it had an accident in the countryside, and it was love at first sight for the two of them. When they meet years later, Ana is engaged to Guillermo's cousin Cristóbal, while he is married and has a young daughter.

There are multiple romantic relationships that are depicted, involving characters from various age groups, alongside the challenges those characters face in those relationships.

== Cast ==
=== Starring ===
- Michelle de Andrade as Ana de los Ángeles Barranco Mora
- José Ramón Barreto as Guillermo Luis
- Luis Gerónimo Abreu as Onofre Villahermosa / Pedro Pérez "El Fantasma"
- María Antonieta Duque as Lázara Martínez
- Rafael Romero as Venancio Ruíz
- Sonia Villamizar as Nancy Sosa de Ibáñez
- Simón Pestana as Carlos Enrique Ibáñez
- Patricia Schwarzgruber as Marilda Cienfuegos
- José Manuel Suárez as Luis "Luisito" Martínez
- Adrián Delgado as Cristóbal Andrés Blanco
- Aroldo Betancourt as Pablo Barranco
- Laureano Olivarez as Rafael "Rafucho" Tadeo
- José Luis Zuleta as Beltrán Parra
- Dora Mazzone as María José Mora de Barranco
- Eulalia Siso as Carlota Miguelina Martínez
- Juan Carlos Gardié as Jairo Jesús Bracho
- Félix Loreto as Conrado Sosa Bermúdez
- Liliana Meléndez as Pura de Bracho
- Adriana Romero as Clara Cienfuegos de Parra
- Edmary Fuentes as Micaela Martínez
- Melissa Álvarez as Mireya
- Michael Reyes as Carlos "Carlitos" Ibañez Sosa
- Karlis Romero as Purita Bracho
- Mandi Meza as Yenny Coromoto
- Ángel Casallas as Pedro "Pedrote" Martínez
- Alejandra Machado as Patricia Patricia Ibáñez Sosa
- Libby Brien as Cristina
- Alessandro Bastidas as Mario
- Jonathan Manrique as Jonathan

=== Guest appearance ===
- Javier Vidal as Onofre Villahermosa
- Daniela Alvarado as Danielita
- Carmen Julia Álvarez as Alicia Leal de Blanco
- Alejandro Mata as Fernando Blanco
- Josué Villae as Claudio Gallardo Núñez
- Jordán Mendoza as Suárez
- Yugui López as Perro de agua
- Marycarmen Sobrino as Olga Villahermosa

== Production ==
=== Casting ===
On May 13, 2016 Sheryl Rubio and José Ramón Barreto were confirmed as the protagonists of the series, In July 2016, Rubio confirmed her departure from production due to the current problems and insecurity that occur in Venezuela and explained:

I went for the situation of the country, it is not easy; The people in Venezuela are suffering ".

After the incident Monica Montañés had to rewrite the character that would play Rubio, because she had been working with the character based on the actress for months. On August 12, 2016, Venevisión reported that Michelle de Andrade would be Sheryl Rubio's replacement in the telenovela and would be the main protagonist of the series. Andrade was in Brazil, when he was called by his manager to assist in the casting of production.
