= Adrián Makala =

Mexican actor (born 1975)

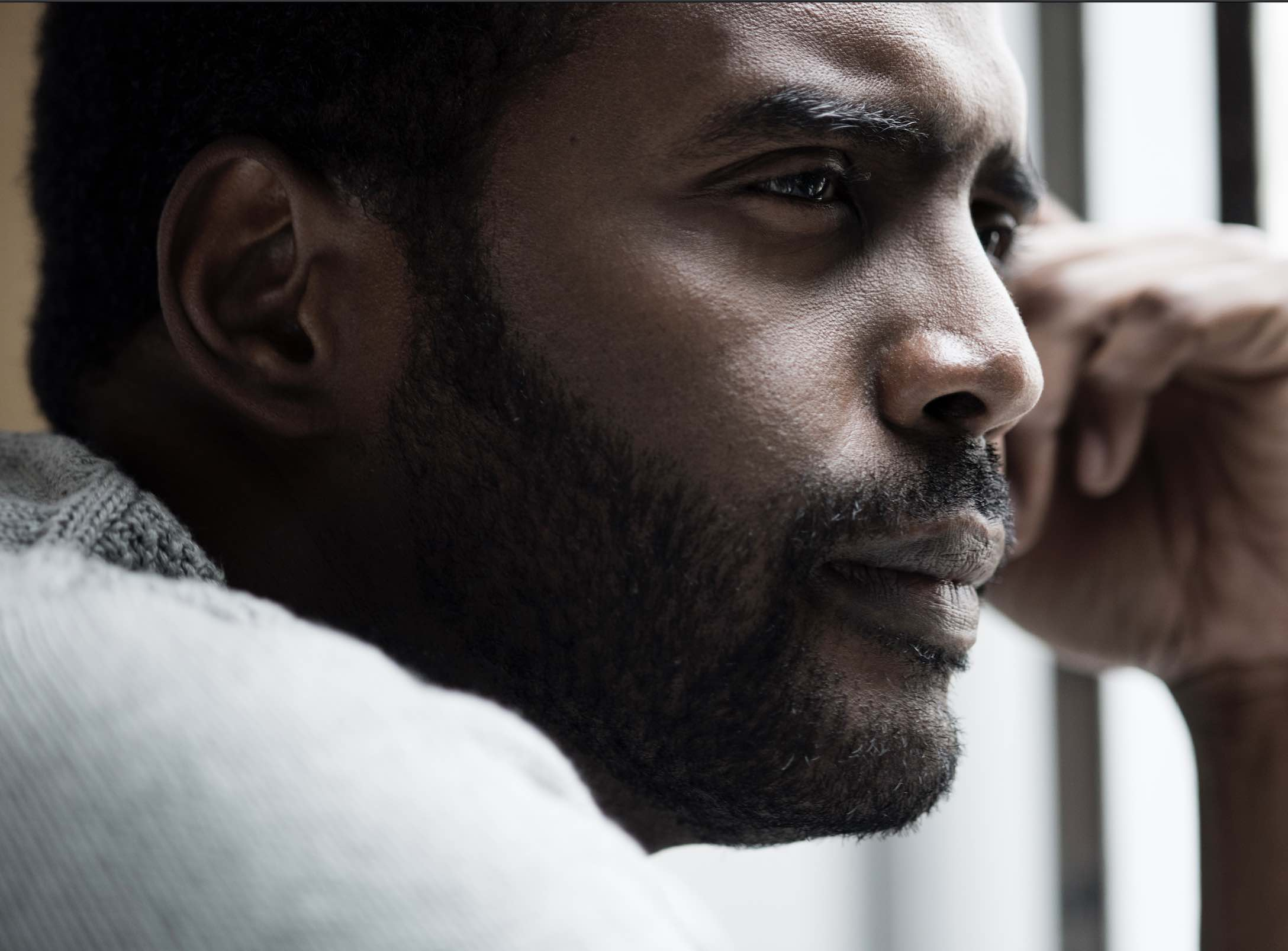
- Adrián Makala
- Born: Adrian Berthram McCalla Rivera; December 14, 1975 (age 49); Mexico City, Mexico
- Occupation: Actor
- Years active: 1996-present

Adrian Berthram McCalla Rivera (born 1975), known professionally as Adrián Makala, is a Mexican actor. He has appeared in the Motion picture film Of Original Sin and the telenovela Mar de Amor on Televisa and the TV series "Los Simuladores" for Sony Entertainment Television.

Makala was born in Mexico City, Mexico, to Panamanian parents who were on medical scholarships. He was raised in Panama by his grandmother until the age of 11, when he returned to Mexico. Makala attended various acting schools in Mexico City.
