= Miss Venezuela 2011 =

58th edition of the Miss Venezuela competition

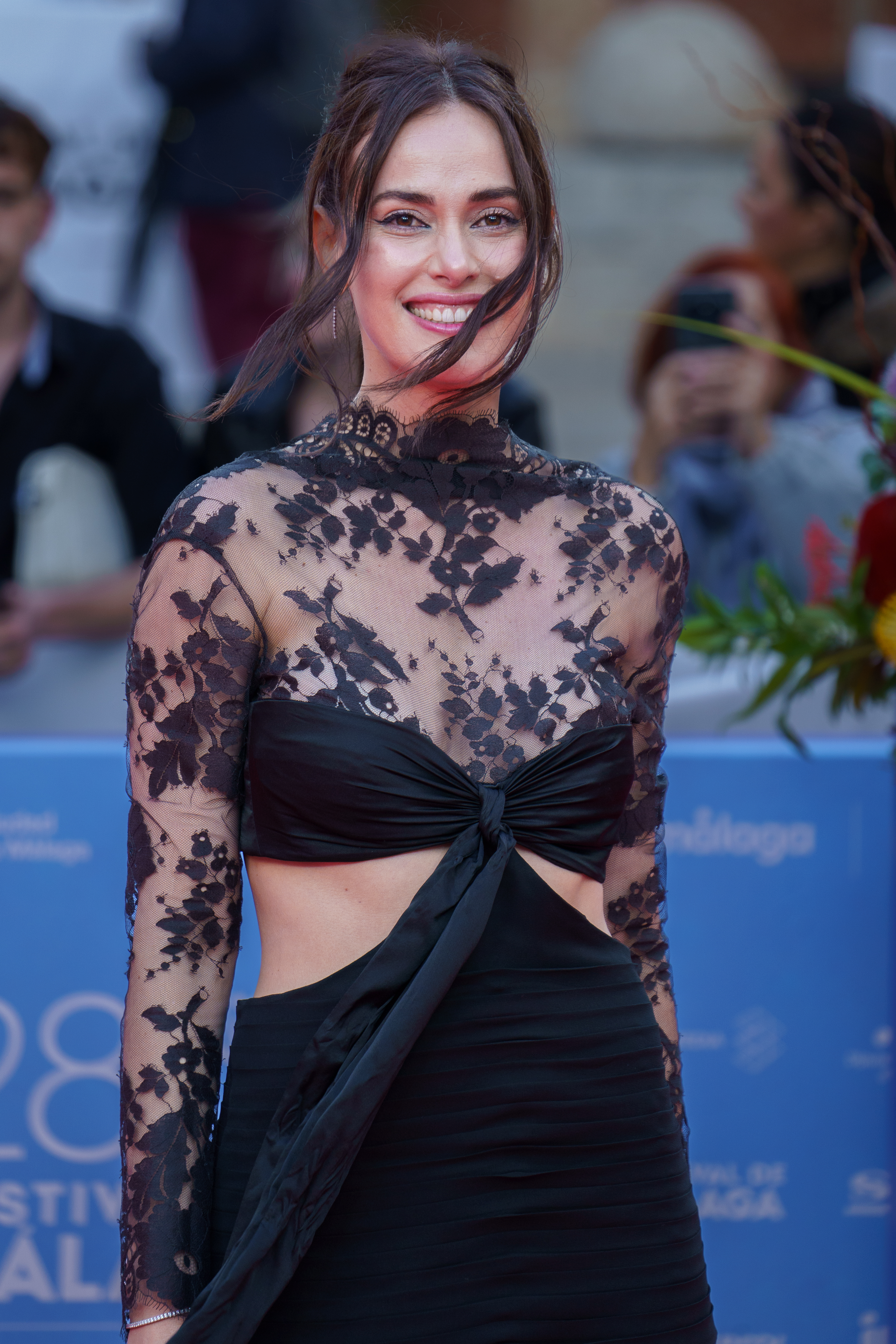
- Irene Esser, Miss Venezuela 2011
- Date: October 15, 2011
- Presenters: Leonardo Villalobos; Daniela Kosán
- Entertainment: Luis Fonsi; Chino & Nacho; Ana Isabelle; Oscarcito; Venezuela Viva
- Venue: Estudio 1 de Venevisión, Caracas, Venezuela
- Broadcaster: Venevisión; Venevision Plus; DirecTV; Univision
- Entrants: 24
- Placements: 10
- Winner: Irene Esser; Sucre
- Congeniality: María Gabriela Quiñones (Nueva Esparta)
- Photogenic: Gabriella Ferrari (Distrito Capital)

Miss Venezuela 2011 was the 58th Miss Venezuela pageant, held at the Estudio 1 de Venevisión in Caracas, Venezuela, on October 15, 2011.

Vanessa Gonçalves crowned Irene Esser of Sucre as her successor at the end of the event. Esser represented Venezuela at Miss Universe 2012 and was placed as the second runner-up.

== Results ==
=== Placements ===
Color key

- Declared as Winner
- Ended as Runner-up
- Ended as one of the Finalists or Semi-finalists

Placement	Contestant	International Placement
Miss Venezuela 2011	Sucre – Irene Esser	2nd Runner-Up
Miss Venezuela World 2011	Distrito Capital – Gabriella Ferrari	Unplaced
Miss Venezuela International 2011	Guárico – Blanca Aljibes	Top 15
Miss Venezuela Earth 2011	Yaracuy – Osmariel Villalobos	Miss Earth – Water
Runner-Up	Carabobo – Isabela Ramos	
Top 10	Lara – Carla Rodrigues; Miranda – María Isabel Zamora; Nueva Esparta – Gabriela Quiñones; Táchira – Milagro Manrique; Zulia – María Gabriela Criollo	

=== Special awards ===
Award	Contestant
Miss Photogenic	Distrito Capital – Gabriella Ferrari
Miss Elegance	Sucre – Irene Esser
Miss Congeniality	Nueva Esparta – María Gabriela Quiñoness
Best Evening Gowns	Anzoátegui – Catiuska Zapata (Designed by Douglas Tapia); Sucre – Irene Esser (Designed by Gionni Straccia); Yaracuy – Osmariel Villalobos (Designed by Nidal Nouaihed)

=== Gala Interactiva de la Belleza (Interactive Beauty Gala) ===
This preliminary event took place on September 17, 2011, at the Estudio 1 de Venevisión, co-hosted by Mariángel Ruiz and Winston Vallenilla. For the first time, the winners were elected by the audience on Twitter and Miss Venezuela web page. The following awards were given:

Award	Contestant
Miss Belleza Integral (Miss Integral Beauty)	Distrito Capital – Gabriella Ferrari
Mejor Cuerpo Dermocell (Dermocell Best Body)	Barinas – Astrid Lozada
Mejor Presencia (Best Presence)	Distrito Capital – Gabriella Ferrari
Miss Naturalidad (Miss Naturality)	Táchira – Milagro Manrique
Miss Pasarela (Best Catwalk)	Vargas – Sara Coello
Miss Personalidad (Miss Personality)	Bolívar – Fanny Ottati
La Piel Mas Linda Beducen (Beducen Most Beautiful Skin)	Portuguesa – Andrea Baptista
Miss Rostro L'Bel (L'Bel Most Beautiful Face)	Guárico – Blanca Aljibes
Miss Interactiva (Miss Interactive)	Zulia – María Gabriela Criollo
