= Radio Atlántico del Sur =

British radio station during the Falklands War

- London; United Kingdom
- Broadcast area: Falkland Islands
- Frequencies: 9700 & 9710 kHz
- Branding: Llevando la verdad al frente ("Bringing Truth to the Front")

Programming
- Language: Spanish

Ownership
- Owner: Ministry of Defence

History
- Founded: 13 May 1982
- First air date: 19 May 1982
- Last air date: 15 June 1982

Technical information
- Power: 250 kW
- Transmitter coordinates: 7°56′S 14°25′W

Radio Atlántico del Sur ("Radio South Atlantic", abbreviated as both RAS and RAdS) was a short-lived radio station that existed during the 1982 Falklands War. Using a BBC transmitter located on Ascension Island, it broadcast in Spanish towards the occupied Falkland Islands but could also be received in mainland Argentina, other parts of the Southern Cone and beyond. It was created on 13 May 1982 by the United Kingdom's Ministry of Defence to "demoralise Argentine troops occupying the Falklands (particularly conscript troops) so reducing willingness to resist".

== History ==
=== Background ===
The Argentine invasion of the Falkland Islands archipelago on 2 April 1982 had a tremendous impact on the BBC World Service. World Service broadcasts to Spain had been closed down shortly before, and cutbacks in the Latin American service were planned. The invasion revitalised its Spanish-language services: more news bulletins, analysis programmes, increased hours and more presenters. The BBC strove to maintain a neutral and impartial editorial line – instructions were issued to avoid using terms such as "our" to describe British forces, for example – which earned it the displeasure of Prime Minister Margaret Thatcher.

At the start of the war, a number of Argentine radio stations rebroadcast content from the BBC's Latin American service, but a decree from the ruling military junta quickly banned them. The junta also ordered the jamming of the BBC's shortwave transmissions, in both English and Spanish, but the operation was largely unsuccessful and the signals could still be heard without hindrance in Argentina and neighbouring countries.

=== Operation Moonshine ===
Given the BBC's reluctance to abandon its impartiality, the Thatcher government ordered the creation of Radio Atlántico del Sur under the code name "Operation Moonshine" (later "Operation Pinochio" after the station had gone live). Against the corporation's protests, the Ministry of Defence commandeered a World Service transmitter at the Atlantic Relay Station on Ascension Island. The BBC issued a press release the same day, making it clear that it was not involved in the operation and, incidentally, identifying the provenance of the transmissions. (Note: The statement read: "The Ministry of Defence this morning contacted the BBC to make available one of the transmitters at the Atlantic relay station at Ascension Island... The BBC will accordingly make a transmitter available to the Ministry of Defence for its own broadcasting purpose.")

Following the Argentine surrender, Peter Blaker, then a minister of state in the Ministry of Defence, told the House of Commons on 8 July 1982 that said that the station's aim "was to make the Argentine forces on the Falkland Islands aware of events in the South Atlantic and of world news and opinion on the crisis, free of the censorship of the Argentine Government". It had a staff of 24 members of the armed forces and four civilians, and cost around £10,000 a week to run. Programmes were produced at a facility on Dean Stanley Street in Westminster and conveyed by radio link – and later by telephone lines – to Ascension.

== Transmissions ==
Radio Atlántico del Sur transmitted on shortwave in the 31-metre band. Evening broadcasts, on 9710 kHz, lasted three hours, and an hour-long morning transmission on 9700 kHz was added later. Using the BBC's 250-kilowatt Ascension Island transmitter, a total of 28 evening broadcasts and 19 morning broadcasts were made.

The station first went on the air at 23:00 UTC (20:00 in Argentina and the Falklands) on 19 May, with a mix of programmes such as news bulletins (including local news from Argentine cities), football results, messages purporting to be from Argentine mothers to their sons deployed in the islands, popular music (such as Argentina's 1982 football World Cup song and tracks by Julio Iglesias, Abba and Cliff Richard) and a "sentimental break" with an "attractive girl presenter".

== Reception ==
The signal was heard in South America and as far away as Canada and Australia. British intelligence reports confirmed that Argentine soldiers listened to and enjoyed the broadcasts, but it is unclear whether they had any impact on morale. An Argentine intelligence report intercepted by the British was critical of, at least, the linguistic authenticity: "The language used was closer to that of Central Americans and lacked the idiomatic knowledge of Argentine Spanish."
