= List of works by Román Chalbaud =

Román Chalbaud filmography
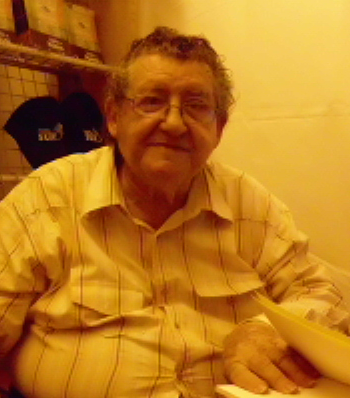
- Chalbaud in 2011

Releases
- ↙Films: 33
- ↙Television series: 26
- ↙Theatre plays: 19

Román Chalbaud worked in Venezuelan film, television and theatre, starting in 1951 and continuing to direct, write, and produce works until his death in 2023. Though most famous for his Golden Age films, he is also renowned in Venezuela as part of the "Holy Trinity" of theater for his contributions not only in playwriting, but also in direction and production. Besides these, he wrote and created many television series and telenovelas, and occasionally acted in both his own and his contemporaries' works. Chalbaud's continuing work into his old age may be due to his affiliation with the successive Venezuelan governments, which have funded his works since such programs began.

== Film ==
=== As director ===
Year	English title	Original title	Country	Length	Notes
1959	Adolescence of Cain	Caín Adolescente	Venezuela	121 minutes	First film as a director; adaptation of own play
1963	Grown Up Tales/Tales for Adults	Cuentos para Mayores	Venezuela	93 minutes	Anthology film
1971	Chévere, or the Victory of Wellington	Chévere o la Victoria de Wellington	Venezuela	26 minutes	Short film, made on 16mm
1974	The Burning of Judas	La quema de Judas	Venezuela / México	97 minutes	adaptation of own play
1975	Sacred and Obscene	Sagrado y Obsceno	Venezuela	120 minutes	"-"
1977	The Smoking Fish	El Pez que Fuma	Venezuela	120 minutes	adaptation of own play
1978	Carmen, who was 16	Carmen, la que contaba 16 años	Venezuela	107 minutes	adaptation of Carmen
1979	The Flock of Angels	El rebaño de los ángeles	Venezuela	124 minutes	
1979	Paper Anniversary	Bodas de Papel	Venezuela	125 minutes	
1982	Crab	Cangrejo	Venezuela	103 minutes	
1983	The Drunken Pussycat	La Gata Borracha	Venezuela	149 minutes	
1984	Crab II	Cangrejo II	Venezuela	103 minutes	won Best Director in Venezuela
1985	Hardware mouse	Ratón de Ferretería	Venezuela	103 minutes	adaptation of own play
1986	Manon	Manon	Venezuela	103 minutes	Also producer and writer; adaptation of Manon Lescaut
1987	The Black Sheep	La Oveja Negra	Venezuela	103 minutes	Also writer
1990	Flaming Knives	Cuchillos de Fuego	Venezuela / Spain	103 minutes	Also writer
1990	Joseph Conrad: Heart of Darkness	El corazón de las tinieblas	Spain / Venezuela		
1995	Body of evidence	El cuerpo del delito	Venezuela	75 minutes	TV film. Written by David Suárez
1995	Our lady of Coromoto	Nuestra señora de Coromoto	Venezuela	80 minutes	TV film. Written by Mariela Romero and Freddy Salvador Hernández
1997	Pandemonium, Hell's capital city	Pandemonium, la capital del infierno	Venezuela	103 minutes	Also writer, based on his stage play Vesícula de Nácar
2005	El Caracazo	El Caracazo	Venezuela	110 minutes	Also producer; won 2005 Glauber Rocha Prize
2009	Zamora, free land and free men	Zamora: Tierra y hombres libres	Venezuela	135 minutes/ 204 minutes	Two versions exist: a shorter theatrical version and a longer cut made for television
2011	Days of Power	Días de poder	Venezuela	103 minutes	
2015	The Insolent Plant	La planta insolente	Venezuela	103 minutes	
2023	Pretty Baby Doll	Muñequita Linda	Venezuela		Post-production

=== As assistant director ===
Year	English title	Original title	Director	Country	Length	Notes
1951	Six Months of Life	Seis meses de vida	Víctor Urruchúa	Venezuela / México	109 minutes	
1953	Light in the High Plains	Luz en el páramo	Víctor Urruchúa	Venezuela / México	90 minutes	

=== As screenwriter ===
Year	English title	Original title	Director	Country	Length	Notes
1972	When I want to cry, I don't	Cuando quiero llorar no lloro	Mauricio Walerstein	Venezuela / México	103 minutes	

=== As producer ===
Year	English title	Original title	Director	Country	Length	Notes
1987	The Years of Fear	Los Años del Miedo	Miguelangel Landa	Venezuela	103 minutes	Executive producer, also actor
TBC	The Smoking Fish	El Pez que Fuma	Jorge Souki			In production; remake of 1977 film

=== As actor ===
Year	English title	Original title	Director	Country	Role	Notes
1986	An Oriental Night	Una noche oriental	Miguel Curiel	Venezuela		
1998		Ver a Hilda Vera				Special
2015	Scrap Metal	Scrap Metal	William Escalante	Venezuela	Policia	TV movie
2017		Cabrujas en el país del disimulo	Antonio Llerandi, Belén Orsini	Venezuela	Himself	Documentary

== Television ==
Year	English title	Original title	Country	Original Broadcast	Length	Notes
1953		Donde nace el recuerdo	Venezuela			
1954	The Venezuelan Story	El Cuento Venezolano	Venezuela			
1954-55		Teatro en el Tiempo	Venezuela			
1956		La piel de zapa	Venezuela			
1956	Crime and Punishment	Crimen y castigo	Venezuela			Adaptation
1956		Niebla	Venezuela			
1957		Marianela	Venezuela			
1957		Bodas de sangre	Venezuela			Adaptation
1965		La tirana (1965)	Venezuela			Writer only
1971		Barbara	Venezuela			
1972		La doña (1972)	Venezuela/México	Radio Caracas Television (RCTV)/Galavisión (Mexico)		
1972	A Woman's Sacrifice	Sacrificio de mujer (1972)	Venezuela	RCTV		
1973		La hija de Juana Crespo	Venezuela	RCTV		
1973-74		La trepadora	Venezuela			First TV adaptation of La Trepadora by Rómulo Gallegos
1974		Boves, el Urogallo	Venezuela	RCTV		Based on a novel by Francisco Herrera Luque
1979		La comadre	Venezuela	RCTV/Coral Pictures		Also writer
1980	The Assassination of Delgado Chalbaud	El Asesinato de Delgado Chalbaud	Venezuela	RCTV		About the life and murder of Carlos Delgado Chalbaud
1991	Joseph Conrad	Conrad, el rajá de los mares	Venezuela/France/ Spain	Televisión Española	70 minutes	Miniseries based on the life of Joseph Conrad; also known as El rajá de los mares
1992	The History of Venezuelan Film	La Historia del Cine Venezolano	Venezuela	Venevisión	90 minutes	Part of the Cuadernos Lagoven series; documentary TV film co-directed with Henry Páez
1996		El perdón de los pecados	Venezuela			
1996		Nuestra Señora de Coromoto	Venezuela			
2000		Amantes de Luna Llena	Venezuela			1 episode
2001		Guerra de mujeres	Venezuela			
2002		Las González	Venezuela			
2002		Aguas turbulentas	Venezuela	Venevisión		Writer only
2005		Amores de Barrio Adentro	Venezuela	Canal 8		52 episodes (all)

== Theatre ==
Year	English title	Original title	Theater Company	Notes
1952	The Young Ones	Los Adolescentes		First play; winner of Ateneo de Caracas
1953	Horizontal Walls	Muros Horizontales		
1955	Young Cain	Caín Adolescente		First long play
1957	Requiem for an Eclipse	Requiem para un Eclipse		
1960		Cantata para Chirinos		
1961	Sacred and Obscene	Sagrado y Obsceno		
1962		Las Pinzas		
1962	Coffee and Orchids	Café y Orquídeas		
1965	The Burning of Judas	La quema de Judas		
1967	The Terrible Angels	Los Ángeles Terribles		
1968	The Smoking Fish	El Pez que Fuma		
1972	Hardware mouse	Ratón en Ferretería		
1974	The Cinderella of Anger	La Cenicienta de la Ira		
1980		El Viejo Grupo		
1981		Todo Bicho de Uña		
1981		La Cigarra y la Hormiga		
1992		Vesícula de Nácar		
1993		La Magnolia Inválida		
1996		Reina pepeada		
