= Cuentos para mayores =

1963 Venezuelan film

- Directed by: Román Chalbaud
- Release date: 1963

Cuentos para mayores (lit. Stories for seniors) was the second film by Venezuelan director Román Chalbaud. It was released in 1963 and was his first collaboration with José Ignacio Cabrujas. It was also his last feature film until the mid-1970s, during which time he devoted himself to television and theater, writing plays such as La quema de Judas and El pez que fuma, which he later made into films.

== Production ==
Cuentos para mayores is an anthology film, a genre popular around the 1960s and consisting of several sections that may or may not be related to each other by theme or character. Segments of these films could be directed by different authors and served as a platform for those who did not have the experience or resources to raise the financing for a solo feature film. In the case of anthologies with a single director, these could be an artistic decision or a way to expose in a single exhibition several short films that otherwise would not reach the general public.

In the case of Cuentos para mayores, the film is divided into three parts entitled La historia del hombre bravo, Los ángeles del ritmo and La falsa oficina del Supernumerario, in which Chalbaud experiments with different narrative threads, atmospheres and styles.

== Plot ==
Fragments of the film

=== La historia del hombre bravo ===
Similar to Adolescence of Cain, a humble couple in a Caracas slum cannot afford to buy medicine for their sick daughter. Filled with helplessness, the father decides to injure himself at work to claim workers' compensation, but after returning home he discovers that his daughter has died.

=== Los ángeles del ritmo ===
A group of young musicians who lead a marginal life and commit misdemeanors try to get work as a band even though they do not have the right instruments. When they get a contract someone lends them the instruments but they are arrested before they show up when they decide to serenade the band leader's girlfriend, whom their parents have forbidden them to see.

=== La falsa oficina del supernumerario ===
A congressional clerk is mistaken for a congressman and takes financial advantage of his position while attending to the people's requests. The clerk flees upon discovery and finds that his affair is celebrated by those around him.
