= América Alonso =

Venezuelan actress (1936–2022)

- Born: María Golajovski Zaira; 4 December 1936; Kruševac, Yugoslavia
- Died: 14 May 2022 (aged 85); Miami, Florida, U.S.
- Occupation: Actress

María Golajovski Zaira (4 December 1936 – 14 May 2022), better known as América Alonso, was a Venezuelan actress. She had an artistic career of more than four decades, acting in telenovelas, theater and films.

== Career ==
She was the only child of immigrants of the Russian Revolution, an opera singer and an industrial engineer. During World War II and the Nazi invasion of the country, she and her family were interned in a concentration camp. Her father died before she was seven years old. In 1948 she emigrated to Venezuela, where she attended elementary school at the Nuestra Señora de Guadalupe School in Sabana Grande, Caracas. A few meters from the school, at the performing arts school, she channeled her artistic interest through the actress and theater teacher Juana Sujo, with whom she also improved her Spanish.

She began her training in radio; later, she had her theatrical debut with Nuestra Natacha in 1952 and worked in Alejandro Casona's Teatro del Pueblo, and then in television, in Televisora Nacional de Venezuela. Later, in 1953, she participated in the launching of Radio Caracas Televisión (RCTV), with Los Gavilanes. Her first contract was for 800 bolivars per month. RCTV suggested that she adopt the name América, after her emigration destiny, and to change her Yugoslavian surname for that of the Cuban dancer Alicia Alonso.

One of her most remarkable roles was in the film Cangrejo, directed by Román Chalbaud, as well as La Gata Borracha, also directed by Chalbaud; Una noche oriental, by Miguel Curiel; and Seguro está el infierno, by José Alcalde. Among her participations in television productions are Sopotocientos, La Cruz del Diablo, Sangre Indómita, Soledad, La Loba, Cumbres Borrascosas and El Escándalo. She also collaborated with the theatrical director Daniel Uribe Osío.

== Personal life ==
Her first marriage in 1959 was with producer and publicist Mario Bertoul. From the union she had her sons Roberto and Alejandro Bertoul; one lives in Miami and the other in Santiago de Chile. Alonso also had four grandchildren. She later married Daniel Farías, who also dedicated himself to the theater arts. América lived with her children in Miami.
