= La planta insolente =

2017 Venezuelan film

- Film poster
- Directed by: Román Chalbaud
- Written by: Luis Britto García
- Starring: Roberto Moll; Juliana Cuervos; Alexander Solórzano; Hans Christopher; Julio Mota; Aura Rivas; Antonieta Colón; Alfredo Medina; Dimas González; José Luis Márquez; José León; Jorge Canelón; Laureano Olivares
- Cinematography: Vitelbo Vásquez
- Music by: Federico Ruiz
- Distributed by: Fundación Villa del Cine
- Release date: 2017
- Running time: 90 minutes
- Country: Venezuela
- Language: Spanish

La planta insolente (lit. 'The insolent plant') is a 2017 Venezuelan film directed by Román Chalbaud. The film depicts the tenure of Venezuelan President Cipriano Castro. It was a box-office flop and received generally negative reviews from critics.

== Plot ==
The film depicts the tenure of Venezuelan President Cipriano Castro, and the title is based on his quote: "The insolent plant of the foreigner has desecrated the sacred soil of the fatherland", his response to the Venezuelan crisis of 1902–1903, when European nations blockaded Venezuelan shores after Castro refused to pay foreign debts and damages.

== Production ==
The idea for the movie stated in 2009 when, during the premiere of Zamora: Tierra y hombres libres, President Hugo Chávez suggested to make a film about Cipriano Castro to Chalbaud and Luis Britto García, both of which had worked in the film as director and screenwriter, respectively.

== Cast ==
- Roberto Moll
- Juliana Cuervos
- Alexander Solórzano
- Hans Christopher
- Julio Mota
- Aura Rivas
- Antonieta Colón
- Alfredo Medina
- Dimas González
- José Luis Márquez
- José León
- Jorge Canelón
- Genesis Mata
- Laureano Olivares

== Release ==
The movie was a box-office flop, failing to recoup the funds invested. The theaters where it was screened were empty and it was quickly withdrawn.

== Reception ==
Venezuelan film critic Sergio Monsalve said that the movie, along with Chalbaud's late work El Caracazo, Días de poder and Zamora: Tierra y hombres libres, tarnished Chalbaud's career and accomplishments as a filmmaker, saying that they were produced to please the Bolivarian Revolution and the ruling party, and panned the film.

Writing for Revista Florencia, Crissia Contreras criticized several aspects of the film, particularly its script and visual effects. Contreras writes that Cipriano Castro's and Juan Vicente Gómez' dialogues lacked depth and that Britto fails to depicts them faithfully, something particularly troublesome being two of the most important characters in Venezuelan history: Castro, leader of the Restorative Liberal Revolution, and his compadre Gómez, who would rule Venezuela for 27 years and described by writer Francisco Herrera Luque as the founder of the modern Venezuelan state. Crissia also stated that the movie's special effects were bad, suggesting that the country's film production was far from acceptable standards, and that extras, and even main actors, failed to depict fundamental aspects of the Liberal Restorative army, such as the Andean accents.
