= La fiera =

La fiera may refer to:

- La fiera (Mexican TV series), 1983 Mexican telenovela
- La fiera (Venezuelan TV series), 1978 Venezuelan telenovela
- La fiera (Chilean TV series), 1999
- La Fiera, Mexican wrestler (1961–2010)
- La Fiera FC, American indoor soccer team based in Hidalgo, Texas
