= La señora de Cárdenas =

- Title card
- Genre: Telenovela
- Created by: José Ignacio Cabrujas
- Written by: José Ignacio Cabrujas; Julio César Marmol; Fausto Verdial
- Directed by: Juan Lamata
- Starring: Doris Wells; Miguel Ángel Landa
- Theme music composer: Fernando and Juan Carlos
- Opening theme: "Si me olvidarás" by Fernando and Juan Carlos
- Country of origin: Venezuela
- Original language: Spanish
- No. of seasons: 1
- No. of episodes: 7

Production
- Executive producer: Juan Lamata
- Producer: Hernán Pérez Belisario
- Editors: Reinaldo Palacios; Vicente Andazora

Original release
- Network: Radio Caracas Televisión
- Release: March 5 – March 14, 1977

La señora de Cárdenas is a Venezuelan telenovela written by José Ignacio Cabrujas and produced by RCTV in 1977. The telenovela became the first in a series of telenovelas referred to as the cultural telenovela because they reflected the reality of Venezuelans in areas such as marriage and intimate family life.

Doris Wells and Miguel Ángel Landa starred as the main protagonists.

== Plot ==
Pilar is a young and beautiful woman who has been happily married for 9 years and works hard to create a happy family. She is completely confident in the fidelity of Alberto, her husband and the father of her daughter. On the day of her wedding anniversary, Pilar discovers a note in her husband's shirt saying I love you, Fanny. For the first time, Pilar begins feeling insecure, jealous, filled with doubt, and finally, surprise and the disappointment of finding out that Alberto has another woman. Torn, Pilar confesses her feelings to her friend Liana while Alberto promises Fanny he will get a divorce but deep down he knows he still loves Pilar, but he is still confused since with Fanny he gets to experience passion and the freshness of a new life while with Pilar the stability of a home and daily routine.

Liana tries to convince Fanny to stay away from Alberto until she discovers she is expecting his child. But Fanny later on lies about the father of her child claiming that its Alfredo's, Alberto's best friend and the husband of Angelica, Pilar's sister. Alfredo is the owner of the newspaper where Fanny and Alberto work, and he has so far been unable to have a child. Pilar eventually discovers the truth and decides to leave Alberto and file for divorce. This complicates things further as Alberto begins to seek the companionship of women near him, and he forms a friendship with Liana which later turns them into lovers. Pilar is disgusted when she finds out about this betrayal, and she ends her friendship with Liana.

Pilar then decides to rebuild her life, and she begins working for the handsome Damián Galvés who offers his support. Pilar is no longer Mrs. Cárdenas but simply a woman who decided to rebuild her life and to have met a wonderful man like Damián whom she later marries. Some time later, Pilar is in the park with her son and bumps into Alberto who already has another girlfriend whom he introduces to her. They both part ways as good friends as Pilar remains happily with her son.

== Cast ==
- Doris Wells as Pilar Rodríguez De Cárdenas
- Miguel Ángel Landa as Alberto Cárdenas
- Marisela Berti as Fanny Muñoz
- María Teresa Acosta as Estela De Rodríguez
- Rafael Cabrera as Alfredo Montalvo
- Chony Fuentes as Angélica Rodríguez De Montalvo
- Cecilia Villarreal as Liana
- Hugo Pimentel as Pedro Rodríguez
- Mauricio González as Andrés Rodríguez
- Mahuampi Acosta as Elvira De Cárdenas
- Susanita Henríquez as María Elena Cárdenas Rodríguez
- Tomás Henríquez as Dr. Enrique Perdomo
- Gioia Lombardini as Eva Muñoz
- Héctor Mayerston as Damian Gálvez
- Aurora Mendoza as Doña Ana
- Rolando Barral as Jhonny
- Francis Rueda
- Loly Sánchez as Perla
- Freddy Galavis as Fonsequita
- Yolanda Muñoz as Rosario De Perdomo
- Marina Baura as Silvia Rivas
