= El rebaño de los ángeles =

- Directed by: Román Chalbaud
- Starring: Mary Soliani; Alicia Plaza; Ángelo Urdaneta; Tania Sarabia; Antonieta Colón; Flavio Caballero; Hilda Vera; Miguel Ángel Landa
- Release date: 1979
- Country: Venezuela
- Language: Spanish

El rebaño de los ángeles is a Venezuelan film by director Román Chalbaud. It was released in 1979 and is based on a play by the same film maker.

== Plot ==
Ingrid, a 16-year-old student at Samuel Robinson High School, has not overcome the impact of her mother's death in recent months and has barely continued to attend classes with an evident communication crisis. Life in the family has become difficult due to the demands of Asdrúbal, Ingrid's mother's last partner. The terror of the maternal image dominates Ingrid's life, turning into a permanent sense of guilt as she feels watched and harassed by Asdrúbal.
