= Zamora: tierra y hombres libres =

2009 Venezuelan film

- Film poster
- Directed by: Román Chalbaud
- Written by: Luis Britto García
- Starring: Alexander Solórzano; Daniela Alvarado; Katiuska Huggins; Erick Ekvall; Antonio Machuca; Antonio Cuevas; Rafael Humberto Carrillo; Antonio Delli; Manuel Escolano; Asdrúbal Meléndez; Freddy Salazar; Luigi Sciamanna; José Torres; Dilia Waikaran; Francis Rueda; Sebastián Falco; Mariana Gil; Vito Lonardo
- Cinematography: Vitelbo Vásquez
- Music by: Francisco Cabrujas
- Distributed by: Centro Nacional Autónomo de Cinematografía, Fundación Villa del Cine
- Release date: 2009
- Running time: 128 minutes
- Country: Venezuela
- Language: Spanish

Zamora: tierra y hombres libres (lit. 'Zamora: Land and Free Men') is a 2009 film directed by Venezuelan director Román Chalbaud. The film is named after and depicts Ezequiel Zamora, general of the liberals during the Federal War in Venezuela between 1859 and 1863.

== Cast ==
- Alexander Solórzano
- Daniela Alvarado
- Katiuska Huggins
- Erick Ekvall
- Antonio Machuca
- Antonio Cuevas
- Rafael Humberto Carrillo
- Antonio Delli
- Manuel Escolano
- Asdrúbal Meléndez
- Freddy Salazar
- Luigi Sciamanna
- José Torres
- Dilia Waikaran
- Francis Rued
- Sebastián Falco
- Mariana Gil
- Vito Lonardo

== Reception ==
Venezuelan film critic Sergio Monsalve said that the movie, along with Chalbaud's late work El Caracazo, Días de poder and La planta insolente, tarnished Chalbaud's career and accomplishments as a filmmaker, saying that they were produced to please the Bolivarian Revolution and the ruling party.
