= Hanging of Judas =

Hanging of Judas may refer to:

- The death of Judas Iscariot as related by the Gospel of Matthew
- A ritual related to the burning of Judas that is practiced in some cultures near Easter
