= Ratón de ferretería =

1985 Venezuelan film

- Film poster
- Directed by: Román Chalbaud
- Screenplay by: Ibsen Martínez
- Based on: Ratón de ferretería by Román Chalbaud
- Starring: Miguel Ángel Landa; Yenny Noguera; Rafael Briceño; Alejandro Corona; Tania Sarabia
- Cinematography: Miguel Curiel
- Edited by: José Alcalde
- Release date: 1985
- Country: Venezuela
- Language: Spanish

Ratón de ferretería (English: Hardware Store Mouse or Mouse On) is a Venezuelan play written by Román Chalbaud, and the film adaptation directed by Chalbaud and written for the screen by Ibsen Martínez. While the play is considered an important and impressive work of theatre within Chalbaud's canon, the film has less significance in his filmography. It was a box office and critical disappointment, with Martínez's contributions particularly panned.

== Story ==
The title refers to a proverbial phrase and implies extreme hunger; the story is one of social criticism. In the story, the main character is successful in the world of television, becoming wealthy, but has a poor social life. He frets over his career because he believes he is meant to become a serious writer.

Interviewed later, Chalbaud said that the protagonist of Ratón de ferretería was written as a frustrated artist, a symbolic character type he also used in other works including Los ángeles terribles, Pandemonium, and Sagrado y obsceno. In Ratón de ferretería the protagonist "wants to be a novelist like García Márquez, and what he's doing is writing telenovelas". Such characters were commentaries on the standards and consumption of Venezuelan popular media.

== Play ==
The play was premiered in the 1970s. Chalbaud wrote it as a return to theatre after some time working exclusively in film. It is considered one of the most important theatre works written by Chalbaud, and Federico Pacanins of El Nacional wrote that it demonstrates "Chalbaud's unique mastery in bringing his dramatic work to theatrical life". It is pseudo-autobiographical. The play is identified as one of Chalbaud's "profoundly social theatre" works, considered rebellious towards the Venezuelan state's social indifference of the middle of the 20th century.

A review of themes of homosexuality in Chalbaud's plays, edited by prominent culture journalist Edgar Antonio Moreno Uribe, commented on Ratón de ferretería as a development in social theme within Chalbaud's theatrical canon. The article said it was his first work that reflects on human nature's response to society rather than treating the effects of society on human behavior as "predominat[ing]", that "it is no longer the environment that conditions, but rather the system of alarms and defenses that an individual has in relation to that environment, as Isaac points out". Chalbaud would repeat his use of the different themes, in analyzing individualistic situations, with the play El Viejo Grupo. This pair of plays are seen as "transitional texts to works of greater maturity", leading to the films he made afterwards.

== Film ==
The film is a comedy and was released on 30 April 1985. It was directed by Chalbaud from a screenplay by Ibsen Martínez, and starred Miguel Ángel Landa, Yenny Noguera and Rafael Briceño; Landa and Briceño were among Chalbaud's frequent collaborators. The film begins as "a light comedy" before becoming more dramatic when Adonai (Landa) falls into crisis. Within Chalbaud's filmography it is considered a minor work. Film critic and writer Alfonso Molina acknowledged that Chalbaud's dramas were his biggest films, with his comedies (namely Ratón de ferretería) typically being small in comparison. Molina also wrote that, despite being less impactful and even with Martínez's script, Ratón de ferretería still carried the characteristic hallmarks of a Chalbaud film; Molina criticized Martínez's screenwriting by saying it "was nothing more than some inconsequential babbling."

It was entered to represent Venezuela at the Havana Film Festival in December 1985, where it attracted a large crowd but did not receive applause. In a contemporaneous review for El Nacional, Anubis Galardy wrote that the film began with thematic fluidity but lost this, and its fundamental story arc, due to the excessive attention given to a romantic sub-plot added to the script. Galardy felt the contradictions the film set itself up to explore, regarding the production and consumption of mass media, "take a backseat." The review also criticized the acting, with the exception of Landa. It felt Chalbaud's use of humor to engage an audience with the themes was successful, and that the cinematography "in general, did its job." Cuban magazine Revolución y Cultura called the film "an insipid comedy".

Venezuelan filmmaker César Bolívar reflected that "many" believed Ratón de ferretería would be successful, but that it was one of Chalbaud's few box office failures. Writer and journalist Guadi Calvo noted that Chalbaud directed the film late in his independent filmography, and that "it added nothing to his career"; Chalbaud would make his triumphant return the following year, instead, with Manón, his adaptation of Manon Lescaut. Ratón de ferretería was also broadcast in miniseries format on RCTV.
