= Piel salvaje =

- Genre: Telenovela
- Created by: Martín Hahn
- Written by: Daniel González; Giuliana Rodríguez; Daniel Rojas; Martín Hahn
- Story by: Julio César Mármol
- Directed by: César Manzano; Manuel Díaz Casanova; José Manuel Carvajal
- Creative director: Tania Pérez
- Starring: Irene Esser; Carlos Felipe Álvarez; Carlos Cruz
- Opening theme: "Vengo" performed by Bacanos
- Country of origin: Venezuela
- Original language: Spanish
- No. of episodes: 120

Production
- Executive producer: Mileyba Álvarez Barreto
- Production location: Caracas
- Editors: Ray Suárez; Iván García; Alejandra Mejías
- Camera setup: Multi-camera

Original release
- Release: February 2 – July 25, 2015

Related
- La Fiera (1979); Pura sangre (1994)

Piel salvaje (English title: Wild Skin ) is a Venezuelan telenovela produced by RCTV for Televen. It is based on the telenovelas La Fiera and Pura Sangre written by Julio César Mármol, José Ignacio Cabrujas and Salvador Garmendia. The new version is adapted by Martín Hahn.

Irene Esser and Carlos Felipe Álvarez star as the main protagonists while Carlos Cruz and Marjorie Magri star as the main antagonists.

Televen began broadcasting Piel salvaje on 2 February 2016. On March 28, 2016, the telenovela debut in Africa on the channel Eva dubbed in English and Portuguese.

== Plot ==
Camila Espino is an impulsive young woman who spent her childhood on the streets before moving to an orphanage as a teenager. She later finds a job at the cosmetic company Mascarada owned by Ezequiel López Méndez who has for years been at war with Fausto Aragón de la Rosa, owner of Capricho, a rival cosmetic company. Camila falls in love with Maximiliano, Ezequiel's son. But their love will be tested by the bitter enmity between the López Méndez and Aragón de la Rosa families, and as Camila continues the search for her birth mother, she will begin to uncover the secrets of the rivalry between these two powerful families.

== Cast ==
=== Main ===
- Irene Esser as Camila Espino
- Carlos Felipe Álvarez as Maximiliano Esquivel
- Carlos Cruz as Ezequiel López Méndez

==== Secondary ====
- Flavia Gleske as Octavia Esquivel
- Estefanía López as Amelia Aragón de la Rosa
- Marjorie Magri as Astrid Salamanqués
- Beba Rojas as La Chila Pérez
- Michelle Taurel as Julia López Méndez
- Gabriel López as Leandro López Méndez

=== Recurring ===
- Amanda Gutiérrez as Elda de Salamanqués
- Kiara as Patricia de Aragón de la Rosa
- Julie Restifo as Marcelina Esquivel
- Gledys Ibarra as Madre Isabel
- Rolando Padilla as Luciano Salamanqués
- Javier Vidal as Fausto Aragón de la Rosa
- Rafael Romero as Alberto Torrealba
- Cayito Aponte as Padre Tiziano
- César Román as Roger Aragón de la Rosa
- Carlos Camacho as Celso Urdaneta
- Ángel Casallas as Axel Infante
- Daniel Vásquez as Gregorio Aragón de la Rosa
- Ángel David Díaz as Sebastián López Méndez
- Fabiola Arace as Rosario Pérez
- Augusto Nitti as Javier López Méndez
- Patricia Amenta as Yelí González
- Germán Anzola as Fernando Aragón de la Rosa
- Mariely Alcalá as Doris Lugo
- Andrés Aponte as Santiago
- Asier Brightman as Moisés "Moi" Castro
- César Maluenga as Jesús "Chuchi" Merchán
- Laureano Olivares as Roberto
- Myriam Abreu as Miriam Dorantes
- Dora Mazzone as Rosa Blanco
