= El Caracazo (film) =

2005 film by Román Chalbaud

- Directed by: Román Chalbaud
- Written by: Rodolfo Santana
- Starring: Fernando Carrillo; Yanis Chimaras; Simón Pestana; Pedro Lander; Mimi Lazo; Beba Rojas
- Edited by: Sergio Curiel
- Music by: Federico Ruiz
- Distributed by: CONAC
- Release date: 2005
- Running time: 110 minutes
- Country: Venezuela
- Language: Spanish
- Budget: VEN 3,000,000,000

El Caracazo is 2005 Venezuelan historical film that deals with the events of El Caracazo, the name given to a series of riots and lootings in and around Caracas on 27 February 1989. The film was produced and directed by the veteran Venezuelan filmmaker Román Chalbaud. It is a documentary drama, not only about the titular tragedy but also putting it in historical perspective. The film cost 3 billion bolívares (approximately US $1 130 500 at the time), provided by the Ministry of Culture.

== Story and narrative ==
The film opens in August 2002, when the activist Simon Petrov is reading the declaration from the Inter-American Court of Human Rights that ordered the Venezuelan government to compensate the families of those murdered in the riot that changed the nation, el Caracazo of 27 February 1989. Everyone at the meeting then recalls the tragic event, the film built around stories told to camera by actors and the real people, and images of the violence. The film is largely told from the perspective of a broken family; Mara and her daughter Alejandra in the present, a pregnant Mara and her fiance Alejandro in the past, who is killed in El Caracazo.

Told in two intersecting narratives — the washed out memories and the brightly coloured facts — the story also reflects on the political situation of the time, and the repercussions still affecting the country in the present. Not only do the characters seem insecure of their memories from both before and during el Caracazo, the film was released in 2005 and so the Venezuelan audience were acutely aware that the number of deaths was never fully counted and that their government never faced punishment or awarded the ordered compensation, leading reviews to call the film timely and necessary to keep the memory alive. Frédérique Langue also mentioned in a 2006 article that the film contains hints at a "known national reality" and some "very specific references", including allusions to the rise of Hugo Chávez in the intervening years. She then adds that it would be unlikely the film could be successful outside of Venezuela due to this.

== Production ==
The film was shot as a documentary, and though, as in many documentaries, some of the interviews and scenes were "staged", these were still inspired by the peoples' real experiences and emotions. However, at least one source has referred to the film as "a fictional look back to [el Caracazo]". In the film, particularly for the recreation of scenes of rioting and massacre, there are 134 principal actors, and 5000 extras: the most performers ever in a Venezuelan film. It was shot on 35mm film, chosen for its visual properties by cinematographer José María Hermo.

A riot scene from the film, with dozens of 'rioters' and a bus that they push over then set alight

In an interview, Chalbaud said that the first scenes shot were done at the Teresa Carreño Cultural Complex, and the last scenes were outside the Central University of Venezuela, showing the repression of a student protest in Plaza Venezuela. Though production only saw one suspension of filming for rain, the importation of explosives from Los Angeles for the special effects needed caused difficulties, causing the original schedule to be discarded and shooting done when it was possible. The filming of many of these violent scenes required a heavy police and even military presence on location.

The Venezuelan Ministry of Culture requested 24 copies of the film when it was released, and Chalbaud delivered these himself. The Ministry had contracted Chalbaud to make the running time of the film at least 90 minutes, funding what was the biggest budget in Venezuelan cinema. This was part of the Chávez attempt called "Bolivarian Cinecitta", funding films that promoted Bolivarianism. It has been reported as the only film made about the historic event, though at least three others have been made, more contemporaneously.^{:40-41}

== Response ==
Internally, the film saw a low admission rate, of 70,000 people, in keeping with the reduced viewership for Venezuelan films. However, Variety compared this to the 2006 Venezuelan film El Don, which drew over 400,000 people.

It won the Glauber Rocha prize at the 2005 Havana "International Festival of New Latin American Cinema". It was shown at the 2006 San Sebastián International Film Festival as part of the Latin American films not released in Spain official selection, at the 2006 Miami Latin Film Festival, and at the 2006 Trieste Film Festival.

It has been suggested that the films relatively positive critical reception in Latin America was due to critics being supportive of the opposition who denounce the event and its political fallout, it has also sometimes been stigmatised as a "film for activists" only.

The film is "Chávez's favorite". Luisela Alvaray connects this and other parts of the film's release and production to place it within what is described as "part of a wider trend in state-funded cinema and academia that revisits history from a chavista perspective"^{:fn 77} in order to reinvent history for political gain in the present. Chalbaud was criticized for the film, with the media in Venezuela "losing respect" for him after its release because of their perception that he had become "a director serving the government" rather than an artist. Venezuelan film critic Sergio Monsalve said that the movie, along with Chalbaud's late work Zamora: tierra y hombres libres, Días de poder and La planta insolente, tarnished Chalbaud's career and accomplishments as a filmmaker, saying that they were produced to please the Bolivarian Revolution and the ruling party. Another critic, Pablo Abraham, has called the film a "poorly-conceived manifesto" while conceding that it was "unworthy" of being directed by Chalbaud, though Abraham does write that the film is "unpalatable" because of Chalbaud: with him at the helm it is "full of an irritating militarist ideology".
