= Días de poder =

2011 Venezuelan film

- Film poster
- Directed by: Román Chalbaud
- Written by: Román Chalbaud; José Ignacio Cabrujas
- Cinematography: Vitelbo Vásquez
- Music by: Francisco Cabrujas
- Distributed by: Fundación Villa del Cine
- Release date: 2011
- Running time: 95 minutes
- Country: Venezuela
- Language: Spanish

Días de poder (lit. 'Days of power') is a 2011 film directed by Venezuelan director Román Chalbaud.

== Plot ==
The film follows revolutionary leader Fernando Quintero who, after the fall of the dictatorship of Marcos Pérez Jiménez, rises to power. His son Efraín, inherits his old convictions and becomes an active opponent of the government and his own father.

== Cast ==
- Gustavo Camacho
- Theylor Plaza
- Paula Woyzechowsky
- Gladys Prince
- Manola García Maldonado
- Antonieta Colón
- Germán Mendieta
- Vito Lonardo
- Francis Rueda
- Julio César Mármol

== Reception ==
Venezuelan film critic Sergio Monsalve said that the movie, along with Chalbaud's late work El Caracazo, Zamora: Tierra y hombres libres and La planta insolente tarnished Chalbaud's career and accomplishments as a filmmaker, saying that they were produced to please the Bolivarian Revolution and the ruling party.
