= ¿Qué pasó con Jacqueline? =

- Genre: Telenovela; Drama
- Created by: Alicia Barrios; Gustavo Michelena
- Directed by: César Bolívar
- Starring: Doris Wells; Jean Carlo Simancas
- Opening theme: Tú y Yo by Emmanuel
- Country of origin: Venezuela
- Original language: Spanish
- No. of episodes: 48

Production
- Executive producer: Nicolás Di Blasi
- Producer: Hernando Faría
- Production location: Caracas
- Production company: RCTV

Original release
- Network: RCTV
- Release: June 17 – August 1, 1982

¿Qué pasó con Jacqueline? (English title: What happened to Jacqueline?) is a Venezuelan telenovela created by Alicia Barrios and Gustavo Michelena which was broadcast by Radio Caracas Television in 1982. The telenovela lasted for 48 episodes.

Doris Wells starred in the dual role of Ana/Jacqueline alongside Jean Carlo Simancas as the protagonists.

== Plot ==
Ana and Jacqueline are two orphaned twins. Ana suffers from a heart disease, and she is always assuming her sister's identity, to the point that she manipulates her way into taking Jacqueline's place in her marriage to architect Alejandro Ascanio. Jacqueline suffers an accident where her face gets disfigured, and she reappears with a new identity calling herself Melissa Vidal after reconstructive surgery. Her goal then becomes to conquer her husband again and to expose her twin sister who took over her identity.

== Cast ==
- Doris Wells
- Jean Carlo Simancas
- Víctor Cámara
- Liliana Durán
- Elba Escobar
- Félix Loreto
- Carlos Márquez
- Yajaira Orta
- Alicia Plaza
