= La gata borracha =

1983 Venezuelan film

- Theatrical release poster
- Directed by: Román Chalbaud
- Release date: 1983
- Country: Venezuela

La gata borracha (lit. The Drunken Pussycat) is a 1983 Venezuelan film by director Román Chalbaud. It featured music from the Billo's Caracas Boys with voices of Mirtha Pérez, Nelson Ned and Agustín Irusta for the musicalization.

== Plot ==
A bank clerk bored with his marriage meets a prostitute. His wife discovers the relationship and the situation becomes more and more complicated. Being in this situation, he commits a crime.

== Cast ==
- América Alonso
- Miguel Ángel Landa
- Alba Roversi
- Bárbara Teyde

== See also ==
- List of Venezuelan films
