= Doris Wells =

Venezuelan actress

- Born: Doris María Buonafina; October 28, 1943; Caripito, Venezuela
- Died: September 20, 1988 (aged 44); Caracas, Venezuela
- Occupations: Actress, writer, producer
- Years active: 1964–1986
- Notable work: La fiera, La señora de Cárdenas, Oriana
- Spouse: William Risquez Iribarren
- Children: Marielba, Xavier, Verónica
- Awards: Golden Camera – Cannes Film Festival (1985, for Oriana)

Doris Wells (born Doris María Buonafina; 28 October 1943 – 20 September 1988) was a Venezuelan actress, writer and producer.

Her best-known television appearances were in Campeones, La trepadora, La Hora, Historia de tres hermanas, Renzo el Gitano, Amor Salvaje, Regina Carbonell, El Mulato, La señora de Cárdenas and La fiera. After the last of these, Wells announced her definitive retirement from soap operas and she debuted as writer and producer with the television movie Porcelana (in 1981). In 1985 she played the protagonist in the film Oriana (written by Fina Torres), which won the Golden Camera at the Cannes Film Festival. She retired from television in 1986 shortly after hosting the game show Concurso millonario, and died in Caracas.

== Personal life and death ==
Wells was born in Caripito, harbour town and oil centre at the northeast coast. She and her husband, William Risquez Iribarren, a wealthy lawyer, had three children (Marielba, Xavier and Verónica). Wells died on 20 September 1988, aged 44, from a rare illness, called Foils.

== Filmography ==
=== Television ===
Year	Title	Role
1964	Historia de tres hermanas	Reyna Montero
1965	La tirana	
1965	Corazon Salvaje	Aimee
1966	Renzo, El Gitano	
1967	Amores de juventud	
1968	Dos mujeres	
1968	El Mulato	
1969	Corazon de madre	
1971	Barbara	Bianca
1971	Regina Carbonel	Regina Carbonel
1972	Sacrificio de mujer	Irene
1973	Raquel	Raquel Rivera
1975	La Trepadora	Victoria Guanipa
1975	Pobre Negro	Ana Julia/Luisana Alcorta
1976	Campeones	Pura
1977	La señora de Cárdenas	Pilar de Cárdenas
1978	Soltera y sin Compromiso	
1978	La fiera	Isabel Blanco
1979	La Comadre	Aurora
1982	¿Qué pasó con Jacqueline?	Ana/Jacqueline/Melissa
