= La quema de Judas =

1974 film

- Film poster
- Directed by: Román Chalbaud
- Written by: José Ignacio Cabrujas; Román Chalbaud (play)
- Starring: Miguel Ángel Landa
- Release date: 19 November 1974
- Country: Venezuela
- Language: Spanish

La quema de Judas (lit. 'The burning of Judas') is a 1974 Venezuelan drama film directed by Román Chalbaud, adapting one of his plays. It was entered into the 9th Moscow International Film Festival. The film was a critical and commercial success and constituted a "rebound" in the career of the filmmaker.

== Cast ==
- Miguel Ángel Landa (as Miguelángel Landa)
- Claudio Brook
- María Teresa Acosta
- Hilda Vera
- Arturo Calderón
- William Moreno
- Rafael Briceño
- Eladio Lares

== Production ==
The play the film adapts "used an actual murder in one of the poorer barrios of Caracas to construct his plot leading to this dramatic people's celebration."

The film was noted for featuring the political jail of El Helicoide in its background, "directly connecting the huge abandoned structure with the city's social miseries."

== Reception and themes ==
Ann Marie Stock noted the film's "biting humour" and its "truly cinematic dramaturgy", qualities that were lacking in the director precedent and first film effort, Adolescence of Cain.

The film "focuses on the daily struggles of the marginalised sectors" of Caracas.

== Legacy ==
The film, a considerable commercial success, was "heralded by many critics as signalling a new era in Venezuelan cinema".

== See also ==
- Burning of Judas
