= Cuchillos de fuego =

1990 Venezuelan film

- Spanish: Cuchillos de fuego
- English: Flaming Knives
- German: Todeslied der Apachen: Cuchillo, Ein roter Krieger nimmt Rache
- Directed by: Román Chalbaud
- Written by: Chalbaud, David Suárez
- Based on: Todo bicho de uña by Chalbaud
- Produced by: Miguel Ángel Landa
- Starring: Miguel Ángel Landa; Dora Mazzone; Jonathan Montenegro
- Cinematography: José María Hermo
- Edited by: Sergio Curiel
- Music by: Federico Ruiz
- Production companies: TVE Televisión Española, Gente de Cine
- Release date: 11 April 1990
- Running time: 96 minutes
- Countries: Spain, Venezuela
- Language: Spanish
- Box office: 11,752,817 bolívares

Cuchillos de fuego is a Venezuelan film released in 1990. It was directed by Román Chalbaud based on his theatre play Todo bicho de uña, where a young man, David, seeks revenge on his mother's rapist and murderer. In the film, which is styled like a Western, a stop-motion animated children's drawing of the young David crying over his mother's body is used to tell parts of the story. After searching through the Andes for ten years, he kills several Apaches for his revenge.

In its theatrical release it was viewed by 367,652 people.

== Production ==
The film stars Miguel Ángel Landa, who also produced it, as well as Marisela Berti, Javier Zapata, Charles Barri, Natalia Martínez, Gabriel Fernández, Dora Mazzone, Jonathan Montenegro, Gabriel Martínez, and Raúl Medina.

Despite being a Spanish co-production, it was not released in Spain.

== Response ==
The film has been praised for its mix of diverse themes, like melodrama and fantasy. However, its use of Freudian references was seen as simple, with the film overall described as "somewhat indigestible".

It has been assessed as thematically aligned with Chalbaud's other films, despite being a different genre. In this respect, it features "mirage-like memories" of David's mother;^{:46} masks and costumes used to show illusion and performance of characters thematically;^{:46-47} pop music in the background used to layer simple meaning;^{:47} the religious name (David) for its protagonist;^{:48} and the use of myths, specifically the "fairytale of the abandoned child".^{:52}
