= Pura sangre (Venezuelan TV series) =

- Genre: Telenovela; Romance; Drama
- Created by: Julio César Mármol
- Written by: Julio César Mármol; Reinaldo Rodríguez; Armando Coll; Julio César Mármol Jr. Constantino Estévez; Manuel González
- Directed by: Olegario Barrera; Otto Rodríguez
- Starring: Lilibeth Morillo; Simón Pestana; Carlos Villamizar
- Theme music composer: Joel Leonardo
- Opening theme: Enfurecida by Luis Silva
- Country of origin: Venezuela
- Original language: Spanish
- No. of episodes: 168

Production
- Executive producer: Alejandro Sánchez L.
- Producer: Henry Márquez

Original release
- Network: RCTV
- Release: October 8, 1994 – May 26, 1995

Related
- Alejandra; El desafío; Piel salvaje (2015)

Pura sangre (Thoroughbred) is a Venezuelan telenovela produced by Radio Caracas Television in 1994 based on the telenovela La fiera produced by the same channel in 1978 and written by Julio César Mármol.

Lilibeth Morillo and Simón Pestana starred as the main protagonists with Carlos Villamizar as the antagonist.

== Plot ==
In the town of San Rafael del Limón, the Paredes and Sarmiento are wealthy landowner families caught in a war. Abraham Paredes is a womanizer who only married once, but had children with several women: First, with Belinda de Sousa, a mute woman, with whom he had his son Aarón De Sousa, second, with Anastasius, who has epilepsy caused by falling off a horse when he was a child. Lastly, Damian, Derián and Eloisa who were born from his marriage with the deceased Eloísa who died at childbirth.

On the other hand, Numa Pompilio Sarmiento is the head of the other family. His children and nephews support him in his fight against the Paredes. Mauricio, the eldest, is full of vengeance just like his father, together with his cousin Numa Pompilio. His youngest son Abelardo arrives into the town from the city, and falls madly in love with Eloisa Paredes. Yomira, the only daughter of Numa Pompilio, suffers from the memory of her former love Damián Paredes who arrives to the town from the capital transformed into a priest, adding conflict to the relationship.

In the middle of this conflict appears Corazón Silvestre, a beautiful peasant who has learnt to survive the harshness of the Zulian plains. When Aaron meets her, he is attracted to her personality and decides to transform her rebel heart to turn her into a lady. But he discovers he cannot marry her since he is engaged to marry Maria Angélica Guillén, a beautiful, wealthy, refined woman from Maracaibo who will become a cruel rival for Corazón.

== Cast ==
- Lilibeth Morillo as Corazón Cristina Silvestre
- Simón Pestana as Aarón De Sousa
- Carlos Villamizar as Abraham Paredes
- Guillermo Ferrán as Numa Pompilio Sarmiento
- Crisol Carabal as Yomira Sarmiento
- Vicente Tepedino as Damián Paredes
- Sebastián Falco as Julio Boscán
- Victoria Roberts as María Angélica Guillén
- Rosario Prieto as Estacia Briceño
- Lilian Rentería as Agripina Bravo
- Leida Torrealba as Mercedes Silvestre
- Julio Mota as Arcángel Corrales
- Jessica Brown as Eloísa Paredes
- Rolando Padilla as Abelardo Sarmiento
- Alberto Alcalá as Mauricio Sarmiento
- Janín Barboza as Evelia Corrales
- Carlos Acosta as Derián Paredes
- William Colmenares as Anastacio Paredes
- Wilfredo Cisneros as Rafael Sarmiento
- Francis Rueda as Belinda De Sousa
- Carmencita Padrón as Nelly
- Dante Carlé as Reinaldo Guillén
- Mimí Sills as Esther Moreno De Guillén
- Perla Vonasek as América de Sarmiento
- Dad Dáger as Aurita Guillén
- Jeanette Flores as Giselita Briceño
- Samuel González as Peligro
- Reina Hinojosa as Lídia de Acopini
- Reinaldo Lancaster as Emilio Guillén
- Natasha Moll as Tinita
- Marcos Moreno as Marcos de Acopini
- Freddy Salazar as Padre Ignacio
- Franco Colmenares as Modisto François
- Rafael Marín
- Leonardo Marrero
- Tony Rodríguez as Tiberio Sarmiento
- Ricardo Gruber as El Turco
