= Alicia Plaza =

Venezuelan actress

Alicia Plaza Tariffi, born April 30, 1957, in Caracas, Venezuela, is a Venezuelan actress. She has worked in various telenovelas, and most recently she has participated in various productions in Miami, Florida.

== Filmography ==
=== Films ===
- 1979: El rebaño de los ángeles
- 1982: Mosquita muerta
- 1984: Adiós Miami
- 1983: La casa de agua
- 1985: El atentado
- 1998: 100 años de perdón : Rita
- Atenea y Afrodita
- 2006: Chao Cristina (RCTV) : Lucía

=== Telenovelas ===
- 1979: Rosángela (Venevisión) : Rosita
- 1982: ¿Qué pasó con Jacqueline? (RCTV)
- 1982: Jugando a vivir (RCTV) : Eloísa Peña
- 1983: Bienvenida Esperanza (RCTV) : Meliza Acuña
- 1985: La graduación de un delincuente
- 1990: Pobre diabla (CANAL 13) : Bárbara
- 1992: Por estas calles (RCTV)
- 1994: Alejandra (RCTV) : Morella
- 1995: Ilusiones
- 1996: Los amores de Anita Peña (RCTV)
- 1998: Reina de corazones (RCTV) : Virtudes
- 2000: Hay amores que matan (RCTV) : Mónica de Montenegro
- 2001: La soberana (RCTV) : Rosa Ozores
- 2002: Trapos íntimos (RCTV) : Beba Solís
- 2004: Negra consentida (RCTV) : Herminia Meaño de Nascimiento
- 2006: Mi vida eres tú (Telemundo) : Adela
- 2007: Acorralada (Venevisión) : Bruna Pérez
- 2007-2008: Pecados ajenos (Telemundo) : Mónica Rojas
- 2009: Un esposo para Estela (Venevisión) : Priscila
