= Alejandra (TV series) =

- Genre: Telenovela; Romance; Drama
- Created by: Delia Fiallo
- Directed by: Luis Manzo
- Starring: María Conchita Alonso; Jorge Schubert
- Opening theme: "Piel y seda" by María Conchita Alonso & Ilan Chester "Embustero" by María Conchita Alonso
- Country of origin: Venezuela
- Original language: Spanish
- No. of episodes: 153

Production
- Executive producer: Carlos Lamus
- Producer: Hernando Faría

Original release
- Network: RCTV
- Release: February 9 – October 7, 1994

Related
- Rafaela (1977); Roberta (1987); Rafaela (2011)

Alejandra is a Venezuelan telenovela produced by Radio Caracas Television in 1994 based on the telenovela Rafaela written by Cuban writer Delia Fiallo.

María Conchita Alonso and Jorge Schubert starred as the protagonists.

== Plot ==
Alejandra Martínez is a beautiful and intelligent young woman who has dedicated her life to the medical profession in order to rise above her humble origins. She believes children are a burden and source of obstacles, as happened with her mother Caridad Martínez who had 5 children from different men, believing that men could save her from her loneliness, but all left her. After a year of medical internship and social work in the rural areas of her country, Alejandra returns to her neighborhood in Caracas where she gets a job at a local hospital. There, she will face the director, famous surgeon Alejandro Antúnez where she reveals to him that she is his illegitimate daughter and she is determined to prove she does not need him to succeed. Everyone at the hospital, including Alejandro, respect Alejandra, except for Luis Jose Báez, a medical intern from Argentina who is macho and a womanizer. The attraction between Alejandra and Luis José will be hidden under the constant conflicts they have. But after a brief relationship, Alejandra discovers she is pregnant, thus repeating her mother's story.

Mireya, the wife of Luis José, arrives in Caracas from Argentina to win her husband back. Obsessed with the fear that Luis José will abandon her because she is older than him, she has spent years playing with his emotions making him believe he is to blame for the death of their son although she was the one who provoked an abortion. Discovering Alejandra is expecting her husband's child, she looks for ways to eliminate her. She seeks the support of Morela, the selfish and arrogant wife of Alejandro Antúnez. Morela always knew about Alejandra's existence, but never told her husband so that he could pay more attention to their daughter Alicia, a repressed child who ends up falling into alcoholism.

== Cast ==
- María Conchita Alonso as Alejandra Martínez
- Jorge Schubert as Luis José Báez
- Raquel Montero as Mireya de Báez
- Manuel Escolanoas Alfredo
- Cecilia Villarreal as Morela de Antúnez
- Raúl Xiquéz as Alejandro Antúnez
- Oswaldo Mago as Víctor Acuña
- Alicia Plaza as Ileana
- Reina Hinojosa as Gisela
- Ana Castell as Caridad Martínez
- Eduardo Gadea Pérez as Diógenes
- Angélica Herrera as Belén Martínez
- Ricardo Bianchi as Raúl Herrera
- Félix Loreto as Porfirio
- Loly Sánchez as Rosalba Martínez
- Ericka Medina as Alicia Antúnez
- Rafael Romero as Chucho Martínez
- Flor Elena González as Domitila Fonseca
- Antonio Machuca as Tulipán
- Iván Tamayo as Carlos Alberto Medina
- Haydi Velázquez as Arelis Bustamante de Medina
- Laura Términi as Niurka
- Franchesca Términi as Luly
- Juan Carlos Láres as Chamito
- Nelson Bustamante as Nelson Bustamante
- Rosario Prieto as María de Bustamante
- Esperanza Magaz as Rosario
- Tania Sarabia as Isabel

== Versions ==
In 2011, Televisa in Mexico produced their own version titled Rafaela starring Scarlet Ortiz and Jorge Poza.
