= Burning of Judas =

Easter-time Christian ritual

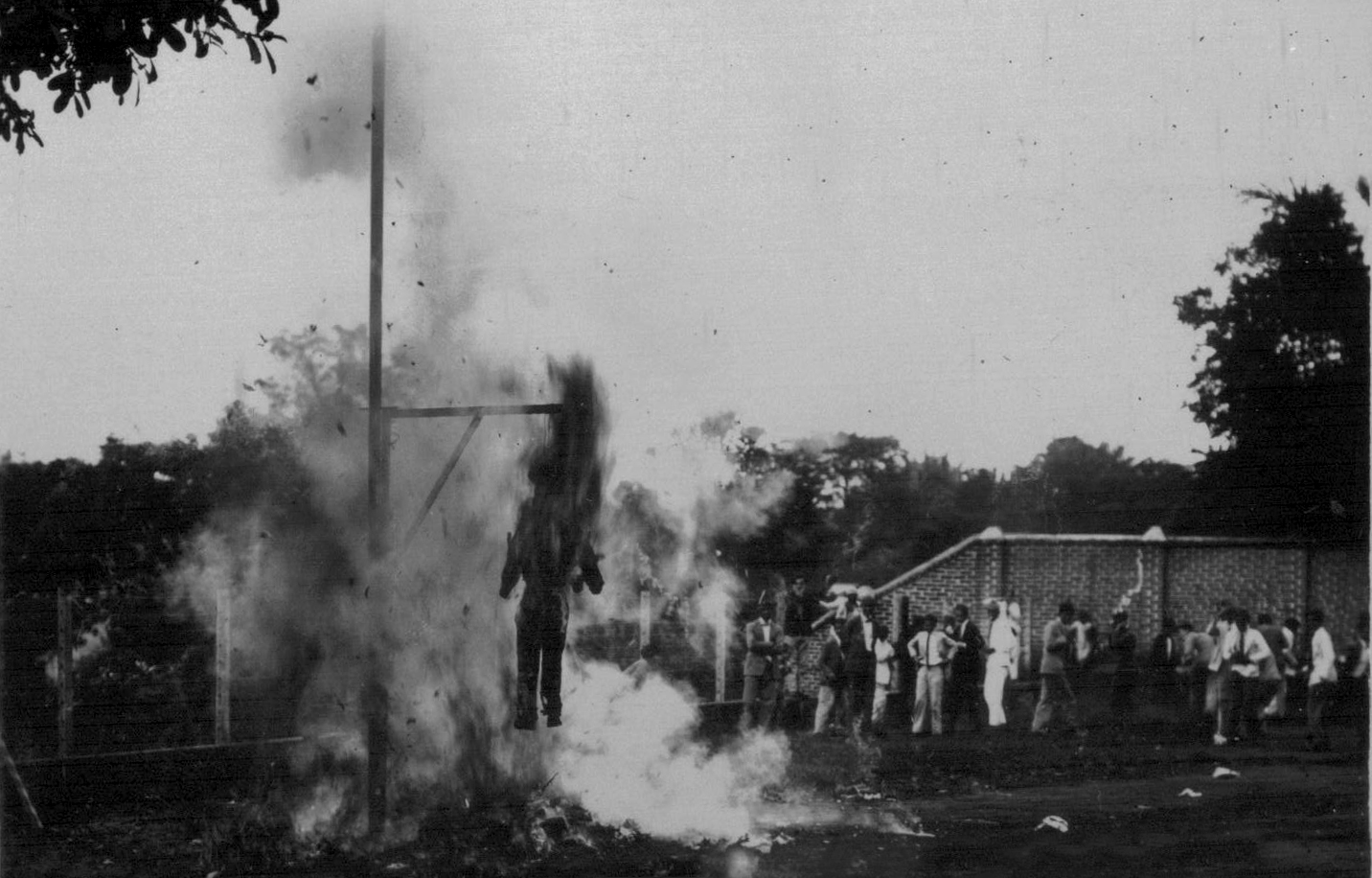
Burning of Judas in Juiz de Fora, Brazil, 1909

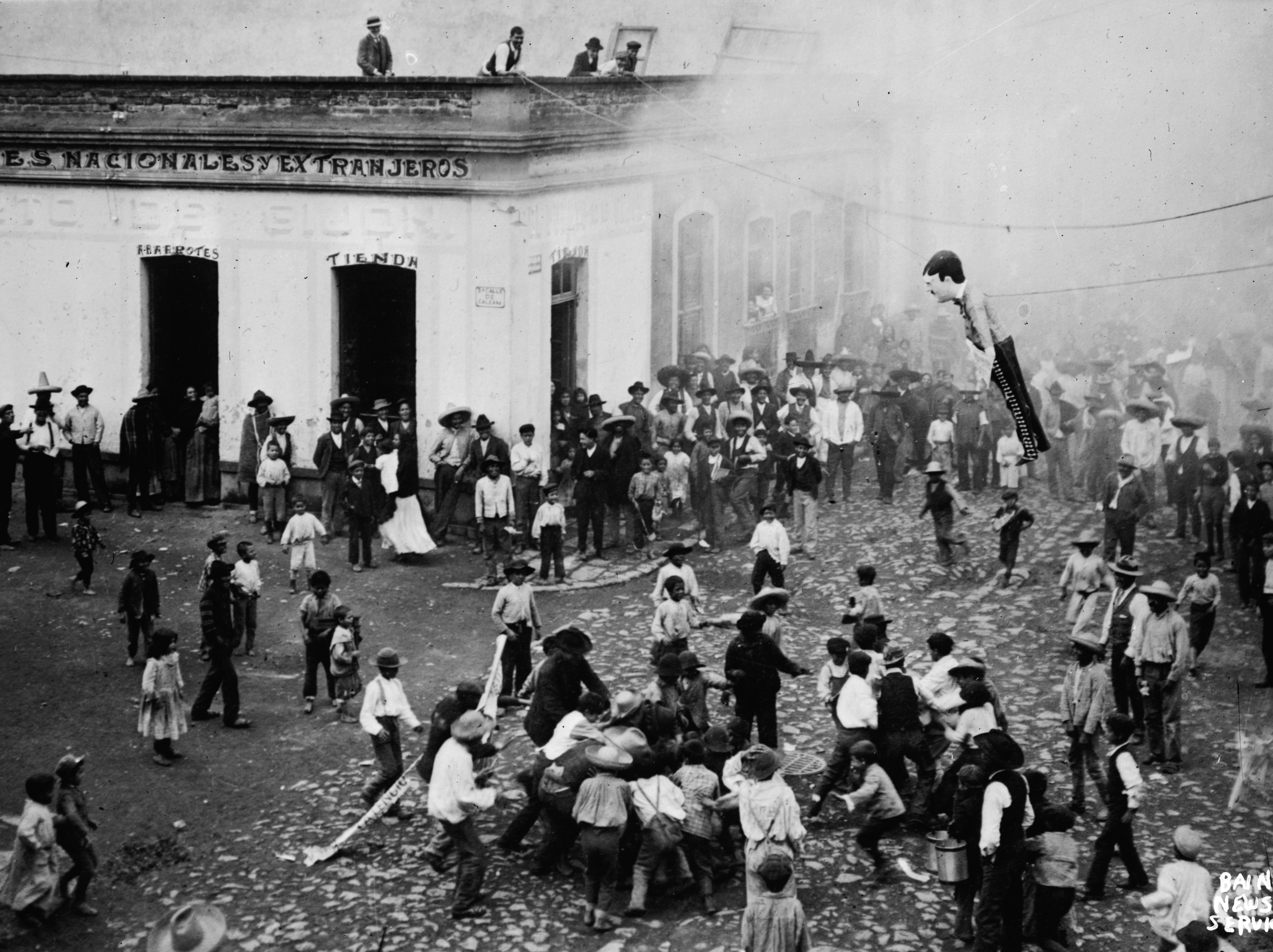
Judas hanged in effigy, Mexico City, early 20th century

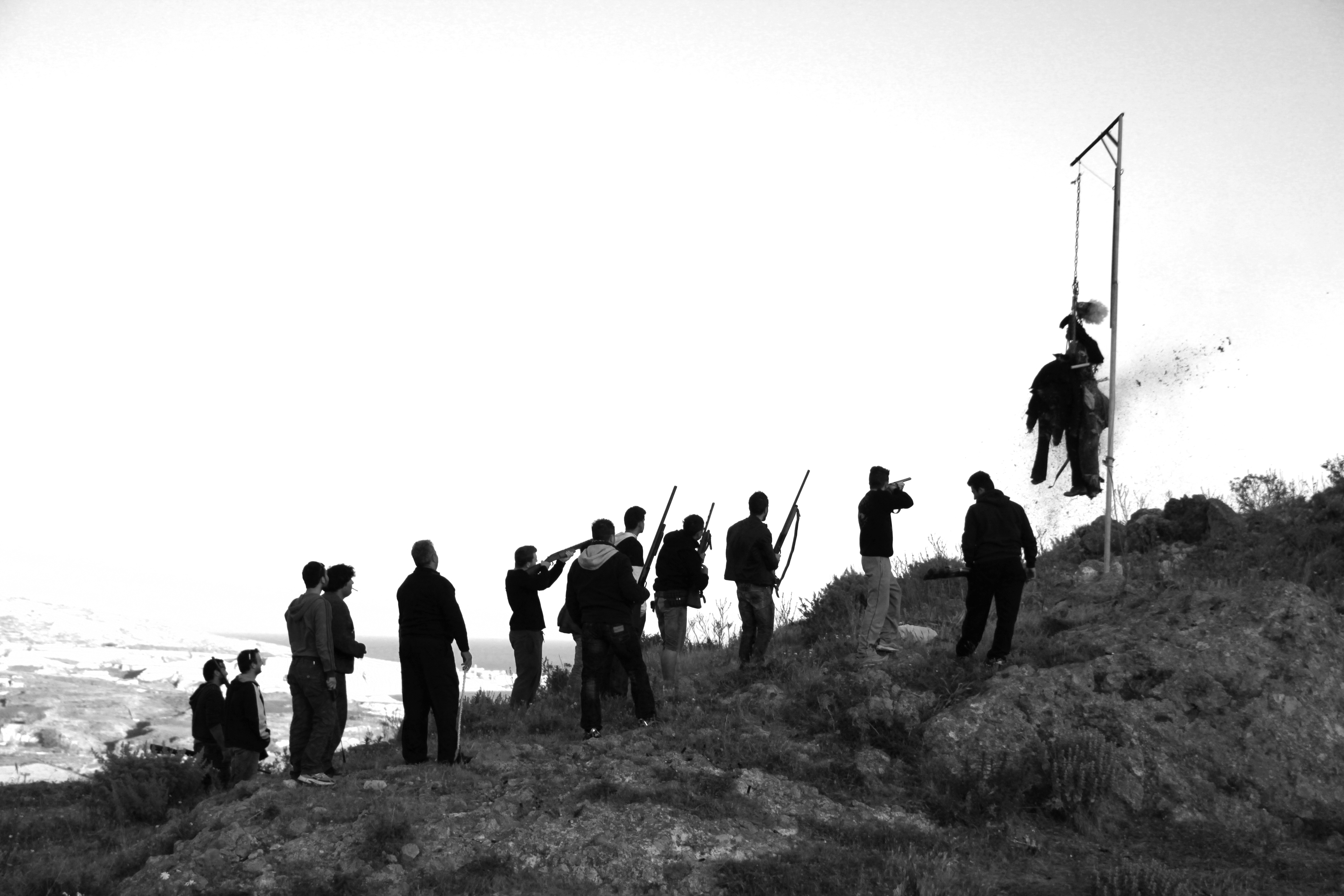
Shooting at the gallows of the effigy of Judas Iscariot, Santorini, Greece, April 2010

The burning of Judas is an Easter-time ritual that originated in European Christian communities where an effigy of Judas Iscariot is burned. Other related mistreatment of Judas effigies include hanging, flogging, and exploding with fireworks.

Though the custom is not an official part of the Easter liturgical cycle, in some communities it is part of the reenactment of the story of the Passion practiced by the faithful during Easter. Details vary, but the effigy of Judas is typically hanged (reenacting Matthew 27:5) on Good Friday, then burned on the night of Easter Sunday.

In many parts of Latin America this practice occurs on the eve of the New Year as a symbol of ridding one's self of evil and beginning a new year in spiritual purity. Some communities observe this ritual using various effigies, including the biblical Judas (who betrayed Jesus). This custom, during which the effigy is burned on a stake, is called "Quema del Judas" ("the burning of Judas") in Uruguay and Argentina, and "Quema del Año Viejo" ("the burning of the old year") in other places.

== Practice ==
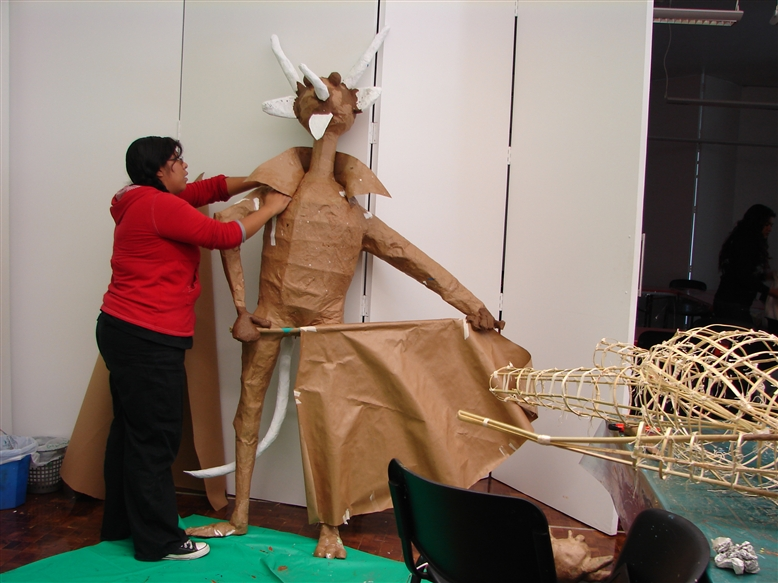
Creating a Judas figure in form of a devil at a workshop at the Museo de Arte Popular, Mexico City

The burning of Judas was once widely practiced across the Christian world in England, Greece, Mexico, Brazil, Portugal, Germany, Austria, Czech Republic, Slovakia, Poland—where it originated in late 19th century, Spain, Uruguay, Venezuela, Chile, Peru, Costa Rica, Cyprus—where it is called 'lambratzia', the Philippines, Paraguay—where it is called 'Judas kái', Nigeria, and elsewhere. These folk traditions are still practiced today in many of those countries.

The Czech tradition of drowning and burning an effigy of Judas (vodění Jidáše) is still practiced in a number of villages in the Pardubice Region. The Czech mint issued a gold coin in 2015 to commemorate this folk custom, which was nominated for UNESCO protection as part of that nation's cultural heritage.

Judas burnings also took place in the district of Dingle, in Liverpool, England, in the early and mid-twentieth century, but was often stopped by the police. In Liverpool's South End bands of children still practiced this custom in the late twentieth century. The burning of Judas is not traditional to England, although a very similar custom of burning Catholic rebel Guy Fawkes in effigy exists. The practice of burning an effigy of the Pope Paul V also continues to exist in England, where as many as 50,000 Protestants gather on Bonfire Night in Lewes to observe the festivities.

Video of a Judas figure being exploded in Mexico City in 2015

== In popular culture ==
The tradition is featured in the 1974 Venezuelan homonymous film La quema de Judas (English: The burning of Judas).

== See also ==
- Stoning of the Devil - a similar ritual performed by Muslim pilgrims during Hajj.
