= La fiera (Venezuelan TV series) =

- Genre: Telenovela
- Created by: Julio César Mármol
- Written by: Julio César Mármol; José Ignacio Cabrujas; Salvador Garmendia
- Directed by: César Enríquez
- Starring: Doris Wells; José Bardina; Carlos Márquez; Tomás Henríquez.
- Country of origin: Venezuela
- Original language: Spanish
- No. of episodes: 120

Production
- Production company: RCTV

Original release
- Network: RCTV
- Release: August 12, 1978 – February 26, 1979

Related
- Pura Sangre (1994); Piel salvaje (2015)

La fiera is a Venezuelan telenovela written by Julio César Mármol and produced by Radio Caracas Television in 1978.

Doris Wells and José Bardina starred as the protagonists.

== Cast ==
- Doris Wells as Isabel Blanco
- José Bardina as Daniel Meléndez
- Carlos Márquez as Eleazar Meléndez
- Tomás Henríquez as Atilio Zambrano
- Romelia Agüero as La Chinga
- Mary Soliani as Magdalena Melendez
- Daniel Alvarado as Adrián
- Lucio Bueno as Padre Elías
- Luis Calderón as Sacerdote
- Martha Carbillo as Rosa Blanco
- Agustina Martín as Sara
- Gustavo Rodríguez as Saúl
- Argenis Chirivela as Abel
- Eduardo Cortina as Brujo Tobias Jurado
- Helianta Cruz as Dolores
- Domingo Del Castillo as Jefe Civil
- Verónica Doza as Juana
- Pedro Durán as Policía Rafael
- Mauricio González as Nieves
- Elisa Stella as Ismenia
- Orlando Urdaneta as Néstor
- Cecilia Villarreal as Elena

== Versions ==
- Pura Sangre produced by RCTV in 1994 starring Lilibeth Morillo and Simón Pestana.
- Piel salvaje written by Martín Hahn in 2015 for RCTV and starring Irene Esser and Carlos Felipe Álvarez.
