= The Smoking Fish =

- Spanish: El pez que fuma
- Directed by: Román Chalbaud
- Written by: Román Chalbaud (play and screenplay); José Ignacio Cabrujas
- Starring: Miguel Ángel Landa; Orlando Urdaneta; Hilda Vera; Haydée Balza; Claudio Brook
- Production company: Gente de Cine C.A.
- Release date: 1977
- Running time: 115 minutes
- Country: Venezuela
- Language: Spanish
- Budget: $285,000

The Smoking Fish (Spanish: El pez que fuma) is a 1977 Venezuelan film directed by Román Chalbaud. The film takes place in La Guaira, in the titular brothel. It is considered by many to represent a high point in Venezuelan cinema, and was made during the Golden Age of Venezuelan cinema.

The story reflects the social reality of Venezuela; it features the poverty and crime but does not make them the centre of the story. It also uses its score as symbolism, something considered novel. Chalbaud describes it as a very character-driven film, and it is structured as a traditional melodrama.

In 2016, the film was screened for its 40th anniversary at Cinemateca Nacional de Venezuela del Museo de Bellas Artes.

== Plot ==
La Garza (the Heron, in Spanish) is the name of the owner of the brothel El Pez que Fuma and, though she has complete control of the brothel and its workers, she allows her lovers to believe that they in some way are running things, including herself, by giving them administrative jobs and pleasing them.

Three men are competing for the love of La Garza, and also control of the Pez que Fuma: first Tobias, who is supplanted by Dimas, who in turn is pushed out by Jairo. After Tobias is taken in by La Garza when he arrives at the brothel with no money, looking for help, the other men use this tactic; La Garza and her man of the moment gives them a job, and, once inside the business, they win their confidence.

But La Garza's last affair, with Jairo, marks a profound change in the story. Dimas, the previous lover, doesn't accept how he has lost everything. He escapes from jail to try and kill the man who replaced him and got him sent down, but instead kills La Garza. With Dimas back in prison and La Garza gone, Jairo takes control of the brothel with a young prostitute he promotes.

== Production ==
Interviewed in 2016, Chalbaud remembers the idea for the film coming from when he was told by someone, in some tellings, a friend, in others, a taxi driver, about a brothel called "El Pez que Fuma", and how the name stuck with him so much he had to write a story about it. The filming took place in an actual La Guaira brothel, during the daytime — this brothel was destroyed during the Vargas tragedy in 1999. Chalbaud spent time choosing the music over a two-month period he was stuck at home with a broken leg, which gave him the opportunity to carefully select which songs he needed. In an attempt to counter the poor quality of sound recording in Venezuela, a French sound engineer was brought on board, but in the 1980s El País did say that the film "suffers from bad sound" despite this.

In the 1960s, Chalbaud took stories from girls at El Canario, a brothel he visited when working in television, to write into the first version of El Pez que Fuma, a play that he premiered with El Nuevo Grupo in 1968. The film took several of the original theatre cast to reprise their roles. Chalbaud co-wrote the film with Cabrujas, saying the process was that he would write a scene, Cabrujas would write another, and sometimes they would write one at the same time. The auteur added that he would not change anything about the film.

== Prizes ==
- Municipal film prize for best movie, best actress and best supporting actress (1977)
- Catalina de Oro at the Cartagena (Colombia) film festival (1979)
- Prize for best movie at the Mérida first film festival (1980)

The film was also selected as the Venezuelan entry for the Best Foreign Language Film at the 50th Academy Awards, but was not accepted as a nominee.

== Reproductions ==
=== Theatre ===
The film had begun life as a play, and returned to the stage in 2017 for a tour between the Teatro Teresa Carreño, Maracay Opera House, and National Theatre of Venezuela in a production directed by Ibrahim Guerra. The defining notes of the production were the addition of vaudeville and expansion of certain characters, and it was redeveloped for the stage in order to develop a greater Venezuelan theatre aesthetic.

=== Remake ===
A remake of the film was announced in 2018. It will be directed by Jorge Souki and star Mimí Lazo, also producer, as La Garza. Chalbaud, who informed the media of these plans, has said that Lazo, who had been in the original, "has wanted to play the role for forty years". He also said that the remake may be released within a few years.

There had previously been a Spanish remake to be set in Barcelona's "chinatown" in the works, but in 2016 Chalbaud revoked permission because he was not convinced of its quality even though offered an "astronomical" amount of money.

Finally in 2025 Venezuelan director Luis Fernandez complete the shooting of a Renake of Smoking Fish, a coproduction between Venezuela and Spain.

== See also ==
- Culture of Venezuela
- List of submissions to the 50th Academy Awards for Best Foreign Language Film
- List of Venezuelan submissions for the Academy Award for Best Foreign Language Film
