= Luis Britto García =

Venezuelan writer (born 1940)

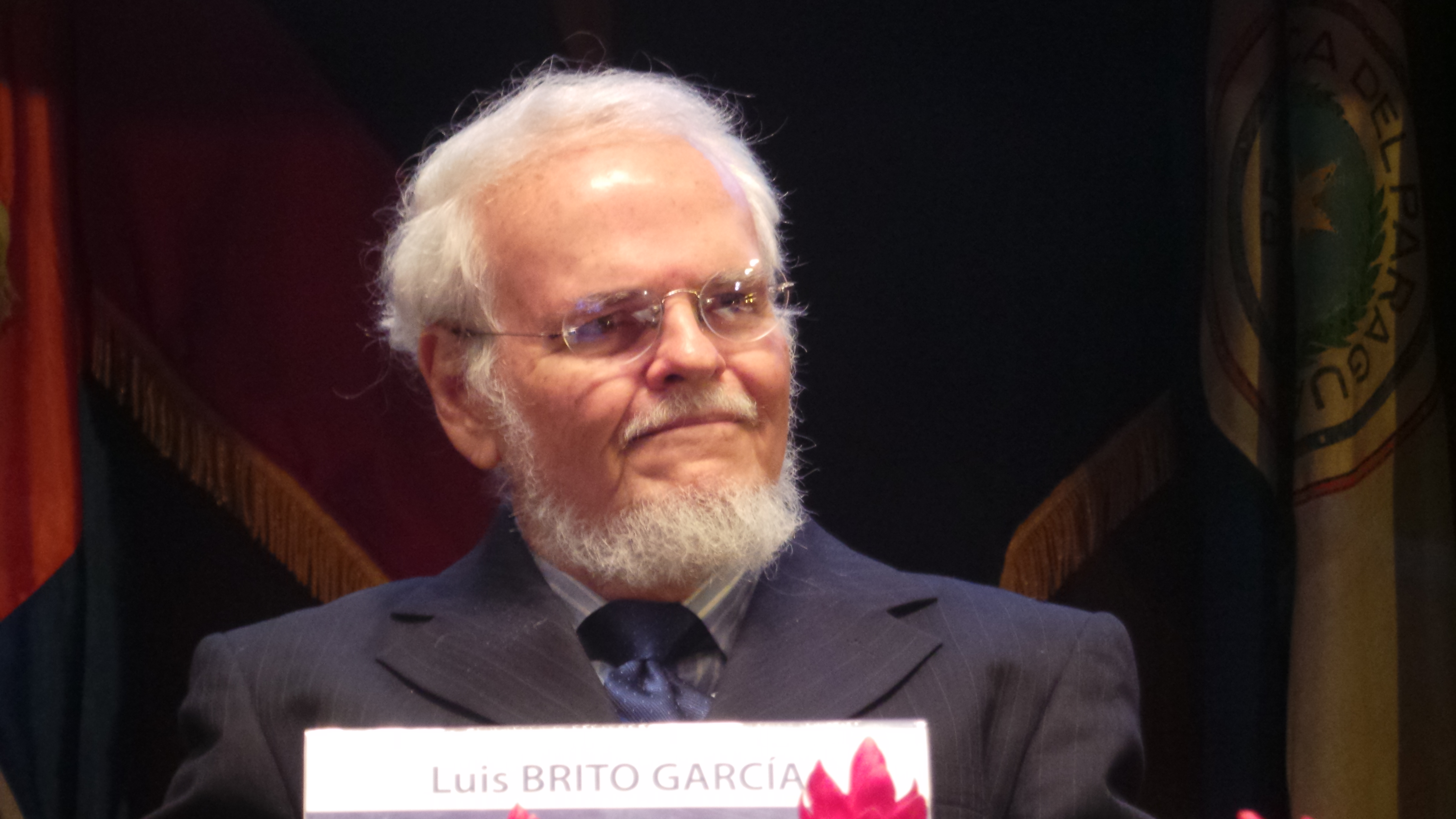
- Born: 9 October 1940 (age 86); Caracas, Federal District, Venezuela
- Education: Central University of Venezuela; École pratique des hautes études

Luis Britto García (born 9 October 1940, in Caracas) is a Venezuelan writer, playwright and essayist. His fiction has been recognised twice with the Casa de Las Américas Prize, for his works Rajatabla (1970) and Abrapalabra (1979). In 2002, he was the winner of Venezuela's National Prize for Literature, given as a lifetime achievement award. In 2005 he was recognized with the Ezequiel Martínez Estrada honorary award of Casa de Las Américas. In May 2012, he was appointed by President Hugo Chávez to the Venezuelan Council of State, "the highest circle of advisers to the president" provided for in the Venezuelan Constitution.

== Early life ==
Britto García graduated as a lawyer from the Central University of Venezuela in 1962 and obtained a doctorate in law from the same university in 1969. He obtained a diploma in Latin American studies at the École pratique des hautes études in Paris in 1982. He taught at the faculty of economics and social sciences of the Central University of Venezuela from 1966, becoming a full professor in 1988. His non-fiction work includes several historical studies of Caribbean pirates in the early Spanish Empire, including Demonios del mar: corsarios y piratas en Venezuela 1528-1727 ("Demons of the Sea: Corsairs and Pirates in Venezuela 1528-1727") and the novel Pirata published in 1994.

== Writing ==
Britto García is best known for his fiction. His two best known works are 1970's Rajatabla and 1979's Abrapalabra, both winners of the Casa de Las Américas Prize. Rajatabla is a collection of short stories which are "characterized by humour and irony, [and] refer to political repression and violence". Abrapalabra is a novel "which explores the cultural and political development of Venezuela" in the twentieth century.

== Political views ==
García supports the Bolivarian revolution, which he said included "socialism, anti-imperialism, the search for continental unity, dependency theory, social control of natural resources, participatory democracy, intellectual commitment, and even civic-military unity".

== Partial bibliography ==
=== Fiction ===
- Los fugitivos y otros cuentos (1964). Caracas: Pensamiento Vivo.
- Vela de armas (1970)
- Rajatabla (1970) - Casa de Las Américas Prize (1970)
- Abrapalabra (1979) - Casa de Las Américas Prize (1979), Monte Ávila Editores - Premio Municipal del Distrito Sucre, Caracas (1980).
- La orgía imaginaria o Libro de utopías (1983). Caracas: Monte Ávila Editores
- Me río del mundo (1984)
- Pirata (1998)
- Andanada (2005) - "2006 Premio Nacional del Libro (Venezuela), categoría Mejor libro de autor venezolano en el extranjero". Barcelona: Thule Ediciones, ISBN 84-933734-2-7
- Pare de sufrir (2006). Caracas: Biblioteca Últimas Noticias
- Arca (2007). Caracas: Seix Barral Biblioteca Breve

=== Non-fiction ===
- Ciencia, tecnologia, y dependencia (1975)
- La máscara del poder: del Gendarme Necesario al Demócrata Necesario (1988) Caracas: Alfadil Ediciones
- El poder sin la máscara: de la Concertación Populista a la Explosión Social (1990) - Premio Municipal de Literatura, Mención Ensayo
- El imperio contracultural: del rock a la posmodernidad] (1991)
- Demonios del mar: corsarios y piratas en Venezuela 1528-1727 (1999)
- Elogio del panfleto y de los géneros malditos (2000) Mérida: Editorial Libro de Arena
- Golpe de gracia (2001)
- País de petróleo, pueblo de oro (2003)
- Por los signos de los signos (2006)
- Socialismo del Tercer Milenio (2008)
- El pensamiento del Libertador (2010)
- Dictadura mediática en Venezuela (2012) ISBN 978-980-7426-19-0 - Casa de las Américas Ezequiel Martínez Estrada Essay Prize.

== See also ==
- Chavismo
- Bolivarian Revolution
- ALBA

== More reading ==
- The Birth of Subcultures and Countercultures: on the Ideal of Nation and the Struggle between the Alienated and the Hegemony - Anthony López Get (2018)
