= Miguel Ángel Landa =

Venezuelan actor, stand-up comedian, and television personality (born 1936)

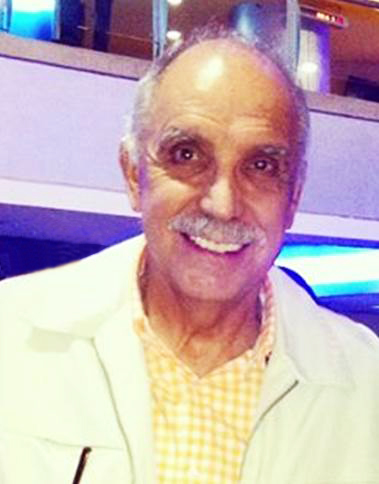
- Born: November 4, 1936 (age 89); Venezuela

Miguel Ángel González Landa (born November 4, 1936) is a Venezuelan actor, stand-up comedian, and television personality best known for hosting the sketch comedy show, Bienvenidos.

== Filmography ==
Year	Film	Role	Notes
1960	Maverick	Swift Wolf	Episode "Thunder from the North"
1964	El Rostro Oculto		
1965	Mas Allá del Orinoco - El Hombre de la Furia		
1971	Sin Salida	Raul	
1973	Cuando quiero llorar no lloro		
1974	Bárbara		
1975	Sagrado y obsceno		
1975	La quema de Judas	Miguelángel Landa	
1976	Crónica de un subversivo latinoamericano		
1977	El pez que fuma	Dimas	
1978	Carmen, la que contaba 16 años	José Navarro	
1983	La gata borracha		
1985	Ratón de ferretería	Adonay	
1986	Manon	Lescaut	
1986	Cangrejo	Inspector Martínez	
1989	Cuchillos de fuego		
1990	Disparen a matar	Comendante Villasmil	
1997	Pandemonium, la capital del infierno	Radamés	
2005	Secuestro express	Police's Councilor	
2012	El Manzano Azul	Francisco	
2013	Papita, Mani, Toston	El Abuelo	
