= Adolescence of Cain =

1959 film by Román Chalbaud

- Spanish: Caín adolescente
- Directed by: Román Chalbaud
- Release date: 1959

Adolescence of Cain (Spanish: Caín Adolescente) is a 1959 Venezuelan film and the first film of the Venezuelan filmmaker Román Chalbaud. It was based on his homonymous theatre play. The widow Juana (Carlota Ureta Zamorano) moves to the slums of Caracas with her son Juan (Edgar Jimenez). The film follows the impact of poverty on their relationships.

The film has been described as "historically and artistically significant" in many ways.

== Synopsis ==
Juana arrives with her son Juan to live in a hillside barrio of Caracas. They are poor, but Juan gets an apprenticeship nearby. Juan puts strains on his relationships after confessing his love to Carmen, a local girl, and walking in on his mother and her boyfriend, the sorcerer Encarnacin. Juan runs away. Though his friends seek him out he hides when he learns that his best friend Matias has impregnated Carmen. After Encarnacin is arrested, Juana descends into alcoholism and abandons Juan, who moves in with Carmen's mother. After some time, Matias finds Juan, who has now taken his place both at work and at home with Carmen. Matias, feeling betrayed, joins Juana. They go to pray at the church of Santa Teresa, where they are killed in a stampede.

Juan has achieved financial and romantic success, but has lost his family and his innocence.

== Production ==
Caín Adolescente was Chalbaud's first film and one of only two he completed before the cinema industry forced him to move into television and return to the theatre for many years.

It was one of two films released as the Marcos Pérez Jiménez's military dictatorship fell, the premieres of which were described as "remarkable" and just preceding the diminishing influence that democracy had on filmmaking. Because it was produced during the dictatorship, the film is not government funded but independent. Chalbaud had founded the production company Allegro Films SA in 1956 with Hilario González, but they still faced trouble financing the film.

== Criticism ==
Brazilian film scholar Paulo Antonio Paranaguá notes that film borrows from Mexican cinematic tradition while also feeling modern. Peter Rist describes the film as "serious" and "realist", and an insight on how awful poverty in the Venezuelan capital is.

Paranaguá has opined that the music, establishing shots, and attempts at transitions do not create continuity, and that Chalbaud acting as adapter of his own work is not suitably distanced from Chalbaud as the author of the play, negatively impacting the quality of the film's editing.

Though Chalbaud developed fiction film in Venezuela through this film, It still uses documentary images for its storytelling.
