= Román Chalbaud =

Venezuelan film director (1931–2023)

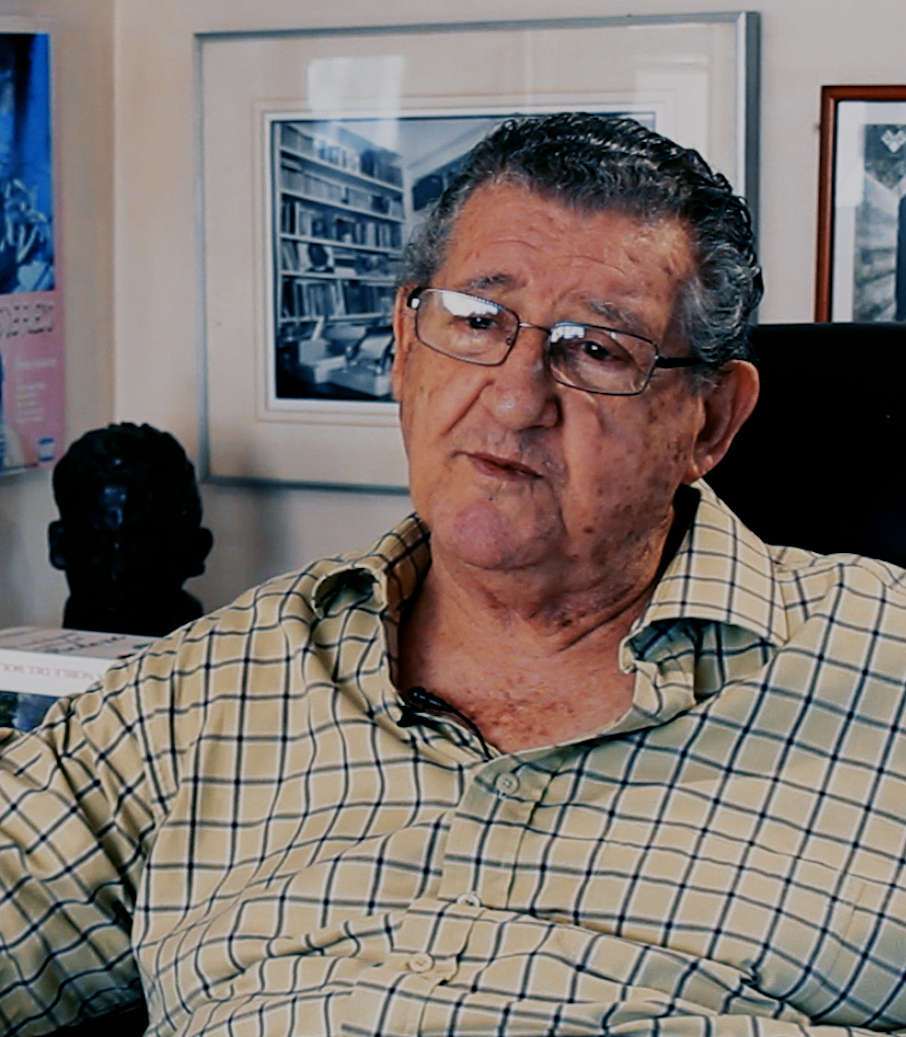
- Born: Román José Chalbaud Quintero; 10 October 1931; Mérida, Venezuela
- Died: 12 September 2023 (aged 91); Caracas, Venezuela
- Occupations: Film director; screenwriter; playwright
- Years active: 1951–2023

Signature
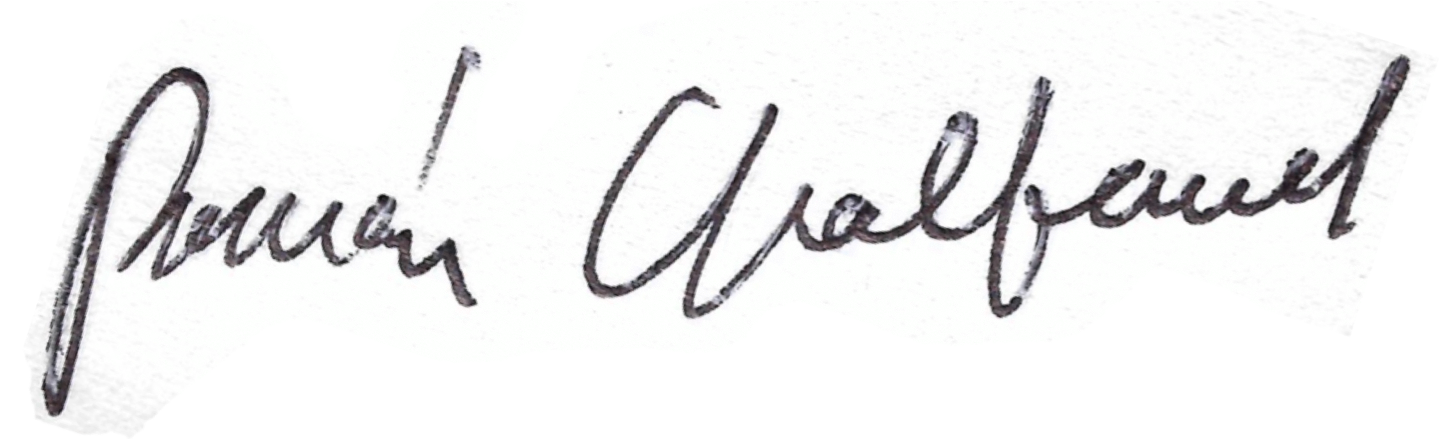

Román Chalbaud (10 October 1931 – 12 September 2023) was a Venezuelan film director.

His latest works are widely seen as political propaganda aligned with Chavismo.

== Early life ==
Born in Mérida on 10 October 1931, Chalboud moved to Caracas with his grandmother at age six, and was seen in the city as a "learning-disabled" "country boy".

Chalbaud was young, "in his adolescence" when he knew he wanted to be a storyteller, but he also had a proclivity towards poetry. Some of his storytelling desires came from his grandmother, who was a keen reader of European literature, and enjoyed watching some French and Italian films. It was not long after his revelation that he believed he could achieve both working in theatre and in film, the arts towards which he has focused since he was a teenager. His journey to becoming one of his nation's most renowned directors is framed as starting when he would go to a cinema as a teenager and watch films from the Golden Age of Mexican cinema, though Chalbaud himself said that he was inspired by dramatic angles when playing an angel in a Nativity play as a child and being hoisted into the rafters, able to watch the performance from a detached perspective, and to watch the audience as they watched the action.

After leaving high school, Chalbaud studied for two years at the Teatro Experimental in Caracas, and then studied directing under Lee Strasberg in New York.

== Career ==
The director was in his late teens when he was employed in television, whilst writing plays. When working one television job, in the early 1950s, he reported that his group worked from 3 in the afternoon till 9 in the evening, and would then spend time at a brothel. It was during this time that he found inspiration and stories for his play El Pez que Fuma, which he would later make into a film. He also wrote the plays Los adolescentes, for which he won the Ateneo de Caracas prize, and Caín adolescente in his early television career. It was also the early 1950s when he worked as the assistant director to Mexican filmmaker Víctor Urruchúa, working on two of Urruchúa's films, Six Months of Life and Light in the High Plains. In 1955 he became the artistic director of Televisora Nacional, a company he left in 1958.

It is possible that he left Televisora Nacional, the official statement being "for political reasons", when he was imprisoned in 1957 for five months by the regime of Marcos Pérez Jiménez, an experience he said gave him a social conscience to do good after being tortured.

Before releasing his first film, Chalbaud had seen enough success in playwriting that he was made the director of the National Theatre of Venezuela in 1958. He left this role the year after the release of Caín adolescente, in 1960. He had made two films by 1963, when cinema diminished in Venezuela and he was effectively forced to return to theatre. In 1967 he took the presidency of the UNESCO Latin American Theatre Institute, and it was in this year the theatre collective "El Nuevo Grupo" was co-founded by Chalbaud; he dedicated the poem "Us and the Theatre" to the group, with which he has worked extensively since, that same year.

The success of Chalbaud's plays is placed on his characters, with the social-realist works characterised by an open treatment of dramatic plots, and a supposedly archetypal selection of characters used to portray irony with the social contexts of marginalisation they find themselves, all which critiques the situation of the country. This is also a reason that his plays, many of them that he made into films, are deemed timeless and socially relevant even in the 21st century. He was awarded the National Theatre Award of Venezuela in 1984. He was considered, along with friends Isaac Chocrón and José Ignacio Cabrujas, to be "a prime moving force in continuing the work of César Rengifo in the development of the contemporary Venezuelan theatre". The three are known as the Holy Trinity of Venezuelan theatre.

Though making films in this time, he had been largely focused on theatre. This would change after 1969, when Chalbaud left his president role and when Venezuelan cinema entered its golden age. He did return to television, joining Radio Caracas Television in 1969, but began his most successful line of work in film direction. Moving into film gave Chalbaud international acclaim, all of his films being screened at film festivals, and one being the first of his country's foreign-language Oscar nominations. His films, some of which are self-adaptations, are said to thematically continue his theatre work. He received the National Film Award of Venezuela in 1990.

In 1974, Chalbaud, with other filmmakers of his generation, started Gente de Cine C.A., a production company which would produce most of his own films. In 1975, thanks to new national legislation pushed through by the Asociación Nacional de Autores Cinematográficos (National Association of Cinema Auteurs) — ANAC — Chalbaud was the first director to receive protected state funding, making the film Sacred and Obscene. The success of this film quashed the government's doubts about the funding program. He was then named President of the ANAC in 1978, and was the Director General of the Fundación Cinemateca Nacional de Venezuela (National Foundation of Venezuelan Cinema) for two years.

Chalbaud resigned from Radio Caracas in 1982. In 1985, the San Sebastián Film Festival dedicated a retrospective to him; he has also been on the jury of this festival, in 1990.

In June 2018, he said he was in pre-production for a film trilogy about the life of Hugo Chávez.

Alfonso Molina, in his 2002 book on the director, wrote that one cannot fully understand the socio-political culture of Venezuela without watching Chalbaud's films.

A documentary about his life and work called Román en el universo de las maravillas, produced by Argentinian filmmakers, was released on 17 March 2018 in Altamira, Caracas at the Rómulo Gallegos Center for Latin American Studies.

== Personal life ==
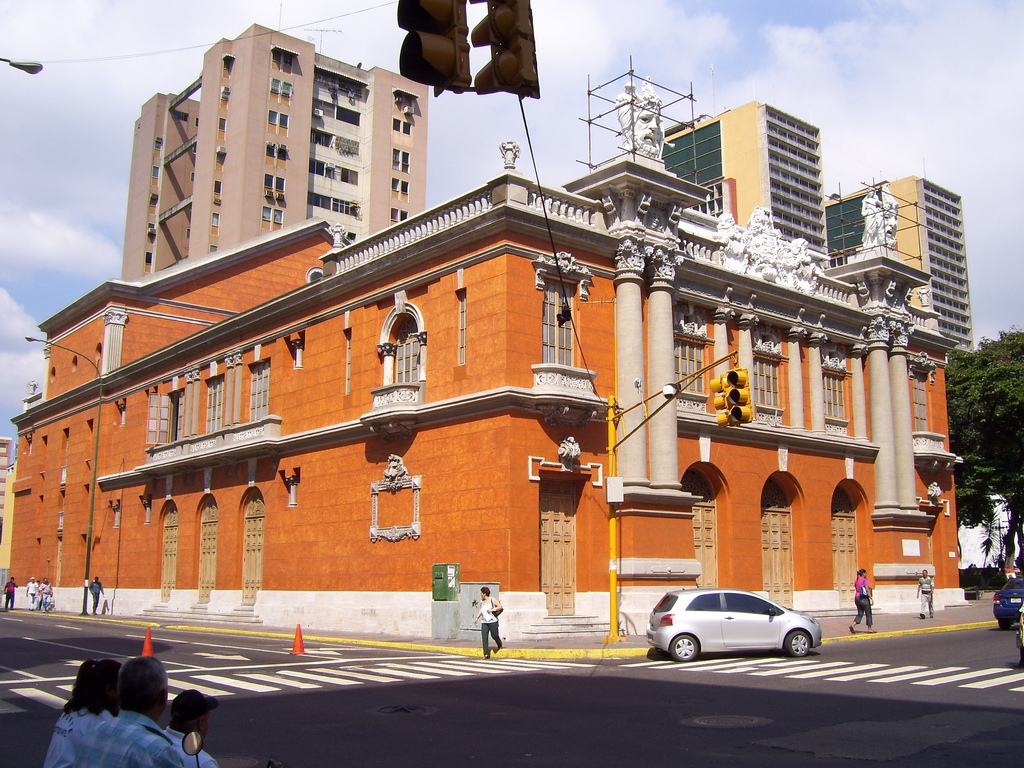
The building of the National Theatre of Venezuela, now known as "Teatro Nacional Román Chalbaud".

Chalbaud revealed little personal information until he was quite old, when he said that though he loved the landscape of his home city Mérida, he considered Caracas the place to grow old. His favourite play was El Pez que Fuma. Fabián Pierucci, the director of the documentary about his life, says that Chalbaud was "tireless, from his early rise until the night he is reading, writing, going to conferences, helping people".

Chalbaud considered Luis Buñuel a "master".

Chalbaud's political affiliation was chavismo, which he believed "most of the country" follows, arguing that Nicolás Maduro was not a dictator and that the opposition since his election are "monsters", justifying the government treatment of opposition members and describing the Constituent National Assembly as Venezuela's legitimate democratic house.

Chalbaud died in Caracas on 12 September 2023, at age 91. Shortly after his death, the National Theatre of Venezuela was renamed after Chalbaud.

== See also ==
- Chavismo
- Bolivarian Revolution
