= Delia Fiallo =

Cuban author and screenwriter (1924–2021)

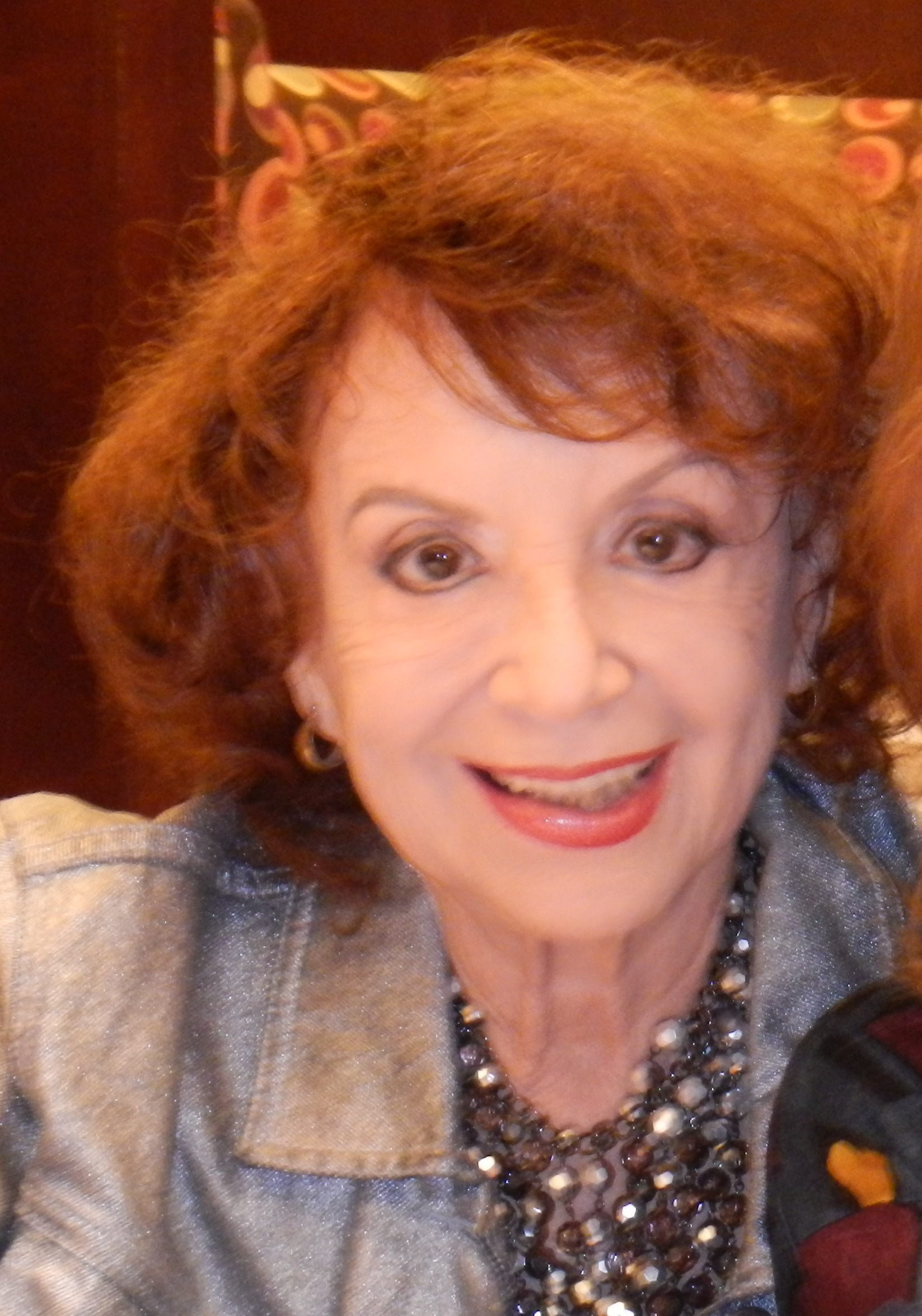
- Fiallo in 2012
- Born: 4 July 1924; Havana, Cuba
- Died: 29 June 2021 (aged 96); Coral Gables, Florida, U.S.
- Occupations: Author, screenwriter
- Spouse: Bernardo Pascual (m. 1952; died 2019)
- Children: 5
- Writing career
- Language: Spanish
- Years active: 1960–1985
- Genre: Romance
- Notable works: Lucecita; La señorita Elena; Tu mundo y el mío; Esmeralda; Kassandra; Una muchacha llamada Milagros; La Zulianita; Guadalupe; Marielena; Leonela; Cristal; Monte calvario

Delia Fiallo (4 July 1924 – 29 June 2021) was a Cuban author and screenwriter who lived in Miami, Florida. She was born in Havana, Cuba and raised in Pinar Del Rio, Cuba. She was one of the most distinguished representatives of the contemporary romance novel, dabbling in various genres which appeared in her literary output.

Due to the contributions she made to the rise of the melodrama genre in the late 1970s and mid–1980s, she is considered to be the "mother of the Latin American telenovela". By the late 1980s, her shows had over 100 millions viewers combined.

== Biography ==
Fiallo studied philosophy at the University of Havana, graduating in 1948. She began writing radionovelas in Havana in 1949, making her first adaptation to a telenovela with Soraya, which was released in Cuba in 1957. She left the country, together with her family, in 1966, for exile in Miami, where she would write most of her novels.

She lived for a time in Venezuela, to supervise productions of her works by Venevisión and later Radio Caracas Televisión. Thanks to her compatriot Enrique Cuscó, she was able to contact the owners of the former, who broadcast her first telenovela in that country, 1967's Lucecita.

Fiallo had not written an original telenovela since Cristal in 1985, since the last project she worked on, La Felicidad, was never completed and she decided to retire. At that time, she sold the rights to her works to Televisa. Their adaptations, as she had declared on several occasions, she had not liked.

== Personal life ==
She married radio director Bernardo Pascual in 1952. They were married for 67 years, until he died in March 2019. She was mother to five children, and had 13 grandchildren.

By Fiallo's account, she had not visited her native country Cuba, since she exiled nor Venezuela since the election of former President Hugo Chávez in 1998.

Fiallo died in June 2021 at the age of 96, at her home in Coral Gables, Florida.

== Telenovelas ==
=== Original ===
==== El ángel perverso ====
The protagonist of the original radionovela is Angelina, a wicked woman who impersonates an invalid to retain her husband Gustavo, and finally, after being discovered, is devoid of truth. However, to meet the standards of telenovelas, in which the protagonist must be good, Fiallo was forced to introduce a new character into the first teleplay – Lucecita, an illegitimate peasant daughter of Angelina's father. She starts working as a maid in the house and has a love affair with Gustavo.

The story was intended to end after the death of Angelina in an accident, with Gustavo and Lucecita happily married with a daughter, but because of its success, Fiallo wrote an extension in which Gustavo is left with amnesia after an accident, and Angelina's nurse Mirtha (who had secretly been in love with him) takes him and the girl from the country to make him believe she is his wife. Meanwhile Lucecita, without losing hope of finding her husband and daughter, comes to serve at the house of the Aldamas, a family of miserable millionaires who regain their happiness through Lucecita. Five years later, Gustavo, Mirtha, and the girl return, and Lucecita starts working as a maid in their house to be near her daughter. Gustavo, still amnesiac, falls in love with Lucecita not knowing that she is actually his true wife. This version of the story is the one which has remained in all subsequent adaptations, all very successful.

- Lucecita – Venezuela (1967) with Marina Baura and José Bardina
- Estrellita, esa pobre campesina – Argentina (1968) with Marta González and Germán Krauss
- Lucecita – Venezuela (1972) with Adita Rivera and Humberto García
- Lucecita – Argentina (1976 film)
- Virginia – Venezuela (1984) with Alba Roversi and Miguel Ángel Landa (very loose adaptation)
- Estrellita mía – Argentina (1987) with Andrea del Boca and Ricardo Darín
- Lucerito – Colombia (1992) with Linda Lucía Callejas and Guillermo Gálvez
- Luz María – Peru (1998) with Angie Cepeda and Christian Meier

==== La señorita Elena ====
Elena, a teacher, arrives at the mansion of an elegant judge to serve as governess. She works wonders, inspiring his children and changing the course of things, bringing true love through help and understanding.

- La señorita Elena – Venezuela (1967) with Marina Baura and José Bardina
- La señorita Elena – Venezuela (1975) with Ada Riera and José Luis Rodríguez "El Puma"
- Atrévete – Venezuela (1986) with Caridad Canelón and Pedro Lander
- Vivo Por Elena – Mexico (1998) with Victoria Ruffo and Saúl Lisazo

==== Tu mundo y el mío ====
Emilia, who lived in abundance for many years, is forced to live humbly through mismanagement and bad luck. Using her knowledge of English, she manages to support her family by performing translations. She finds love in the arms of a young man of good standing, and although her grandmother and sister do not support her, returns to her life of luxury.

- Rosario – Venezuela (1968) with Marina Baura and José Bardina
- Emilia – Venezuela (1979–1980) with Elluz Peraza and Eduardo Serrano
- Tu mundo y el mío – Argentina (1987) with Nohely Arteaga and Daniel Guerrero
- Fabiola – Venezuela (1989) with Alba Roversi and Guillermo Dávila
- Second part of Gardenia – Venezuela (1990) with Caridad Canelón and Orlando Urdaneta
- Paloma – Colombia (1994–1995) with Nelly Moreno and Edmundo Troya
- María Emilia, querida – Peru (1999) with Coraima Torres and Juan Soler

==== Lisa, mi amor ====
A secretary to a successful businessman secretly loves her boss and gives him loyalty, understanding, and support.

- Lisa, mi amor – Venezuela (1970) with Marina Baura and José Bardina
- Buenos días, Isabel – Venezuela (1980) with Flor Núñez and José Bardina
- Bianca Vidal – México (1983) with Edith González and Salvador Pineda
- Inés Duarte, secretaria – Venezuela (1990–1991) with Amanda Gutiérrez and Víctor Cámara
- Secretos del alma – Mexico (2008) with Ivonne Montero and Humberto Zurita
- Amor Secreto – Venezuela (2014) with Alejandra Sandoval and Miguel de León

==== Esmeralda ====
The daughter of a powerful family is exchanged at birth with a poor country orphan. She is blind but very beautiful, and holds proof of her origin and fortune in the form of emerald earrings.

- Esmeralda – Venezuela (1971) with Lupita Ferrer and José Bardina
- Topacio – Venezuela (1984) with Grecia Colmenares and Víctor Cámara
- Esmeralda – Mexico (1997) with Leticia Calderón and Fernando Colunga
- Esmeralda – Brazil (2004–2005) with Bianca Castanho and Cláudio Lins
- Sin tu mirada – Mexico (2017–2018) with Claudia Martin and Osvaldo de Leon

==== María Teresa ====
A beautiful girl selling flowers meets a pianist who is actually a rich kid hiding a grudge against a woman he thinks murdered his father, and who turns out to be the lost aunt of María Teresa.

- María Teresa – Venezuela (1972) with Lupita Ferrer and José Bardina
- Primavera – Venezuela (1988) with Gigi Zanchetta and Fernando Carrillo
- Rosangelica – Venezuela (1993) with Sonya Smith and Víctor Cámara (very loose adaptation)
- Rosalinda – Mexico (1999) with Thalía and Fernando Carrillo
- Rosalinda – Philippines (2009) with Carla Abellana and Geoff Eigenmann

==== Peregrina ====
A stepmother gets rid of her husband's granddaughter, delivering her to a circus. Years later the circus comes back to town, bringing this woman who inspires crazy love in their two spoiled and rebellious twins.

- Peregrina – Venezuela (1973) with Rebeca González and José Bardina
- La muchacha del circo – Venezuela (1988) with Catherine Fulop and Fernando Carrillo
- Kassandra – Venezuela (1992) with Coraima Torres and Osvaldo Ríos
- Peregrina – Mexico (2005–2006) with África Zavala and Eduardo Capetillo

==== Una muchacha llamada Milagros ====
A young girl lives traumatized after being raped by a man she later falls in love with – a somewhat strong story at the time.

- Una muchacha llamada Milagros – Venezuela (1974–1975) with Rebeca González and José Bardina
- Mi amada Beatriz – Venezuela (1987) with Catherine Fulop and Miguel Alcántara
- Cuidado con el ángel – Mexico (2008–2009) with Maite Perroni and William Levy

==== Mariana de la noche ====
Mariana is seen in the village as a future black widow because she has inexplicably bad luck with her suitors. What is actually happening is that her wicked stepfather is responsible for getting rid of them until her true love arrives to fight for Mariana.

- Mariana de la noche – Venezuela (1976) with Lupita Ferrer and José Bardina
- Selva María – Venezuela (1988) with Mariela Alcalá and Franklin Virgüez
- Mariana de la Noche – Mexico (2003–2004) with Alejandra Barros and Jorge Salinas

==== La Zulianita ====
A pretty girl, for reasons beyond her control, leaves her village for the city, becoming the maid of a wealthy family. She meets her true love, creating a passionate triangle that involves the whole family.

- La zulianita – Venezuela (1977), with Lupita Ferrer and José Bardina
- María de nadie – Argentina (1985), with Grecia Colmenares and Jorge Martínez
- Maribel – Venezuela (1989), with Tatiana Capote and Luis José Santander (very loose adaptation)
- Morelia – Mexico–US (1994–1995), with Alpha Acosta and Arturo Peniche
- Un refugio para el amor – Mexico (2012), with Zuria Vega and Gabriel Soto

==== Rafaela ====
Her mother was unlucky in love and lives in poverty. Rafaela becomes a doctor and meets the love of her life, discovers she is the daughter of a doctor, and lives happily.

- Rafaela – Venezuela (1977) with Chelo Rodríguez and Arnaldo André
- Roberta – Venezuela (1987) with Tatiana Capote and Henry Zakka (very loose adaptation)
- Alejandra – Venezuela (1994) with María Conchita Alonso and Jorge Schuber
- Rafaela – Mexico (2011) with Scarlet Ortiz and Jorge Poza

==== María del mar ====
María Celeste grows up alone without the protection of a father or mother. She does not know that her mother lost her mind after being raped by the evil Leonidas Parra Montiel and wanders the village streets desperately searching for her daughter. The handsome Victor Manuel Galindez arrives, and falls in love with Maria Celeste. At the same time, Victor Manuel rescues a beautiful but strange woman from the sea.

- María del Mar – Venezuela (1978) with Chelo Rodríguez and Arnaldo André
- Mar de amor – Mexico (2009–2010) with Zuria Vega and Mario Cimarro

==== Ligia Sandoval ====
Because of the irresponsibility of a man who cheated, Ligia Sandoval becomes a single mother and lives in a humble residential area with her godmother and a teenage sister. To everyone, Ligia's son is her younger brother. The male protagonist is Luis Gerardo, a young doctor devoted to research who has a fling with Lissette, who manages to bring him to the altar. The marriage is doomed from the beginning. He decides to divorce, but unfortunately a car accident blinds him and his wife.

- Ligia Sandoval – Venezuela (1981) with Lupita Ferrer and José Bardina
- Todo Por Tu Amor – Venezuela (1997) with Jeannette Rodríguez and Jean Carlos Simancas (very loose adaptation)

==== Mi mejor amiga ====
- Mi mejor amiga – Venezuela (1981) with Flor Núñez and Félix Loreto

==== La heredera ====
Cristina, an orphan girl, leaves her humble village for Caracas and the house of her wicked aunt Luisa Zambrano and her cousins. She hopes to become a successful puppeteer in the orthopedic children's hospital, despite having a disability in one foot. She does not know she is the daughter of Ezequiel Zambrano, a powerful businessman who has been desperately searching for her for years. Zembrano takes her to meet the love of her life, the lawyer Alfredo Mendez who seeks vengeance for his past which haunts him day and night.

- La heredera – Venezuela (1982) with Hilda Carrero and Eduardo Serrano
- Guadalupe – US–Spain (1993–1994) with Adela Noriega and Eduardo Yáñez
- Milagros – Peru (2000) with Sonya Smith and Roberto Mateos

==== Querida mamá ====
This story was brought to the screen for the first time when Venezuela had a law limiting the number of chapters in telenovelas. Its success caused a sequel to be planned but it was, in the end, not made, leaving the telenovela with an open and incomplete ending. In later versions the unpublished second part was added, telling the whole story.

- Querida mamá – Venezuela (1982) with Hilda Carrero and Eduardo Serrano
- Marielena – US–Spain (1992–1993) with Lucía Méndez and Eduardo Yáñez
- Soledad – Peru (2001) with Coraima Torres and Guillermo Pérez

==== Siempre te he querido ====
- Marta y Javier – Venezuela (1982) with Mayra Alejandra and Carlos Olivier (very loose adaptation)
- Extension of Cuidado con el ángel – Mexico (2008–2009) with Maite Perroni and William Levy

==== Leonela ====
This telenovela was presented, in its first screen version, in two parts with different titles – Leonela and Miedo al amor. In the later version, the two parts were adapted into one telenovela.

- Leonela – Venezuela (1984) with Mayra Alejandra and Carlos Olivier
- Miedo al amor – Venezuela (1984–1985) with Mayra Alejandra and Carlos Olivier
- Leonela, muriendo de amor – Peru (1997–1998) with Mariana Levy and Diego Bertie

==== Cristal ====
Cristal lives with her friends and dreams of becoming a model. She achieves this at a prominent fashion house, where she happens to find the love of her life in the arms of the owner's stepson. The owner turns out to be her mother, who has spent years searching for her since his paternal grandmother took her away.

- Cristal – Venezuela (1985–1986) with Lupita Ferrer, Jeannette Rodríguez, Carlos Mata, and Raúl Amundaray
- Bellísima – Venezuela (1991–1992) with Emma Rabbe, Víctor Cámara, and Nancy González (very loose adaptation)
- El Privilegio de Amar – Mexico (1998–1999) with Helena Rojo, Adela Noriega, René Strickler, and Andrés García
- Cristal – Brazil (2006) with Bete Coelho, Bianca Castanho, Dado Dolabella, and Giuseppe Oristanio
- Triunfo del amor – Mexico (2010–2011) with Victoria Ruffo, Maite Perroni, William Levy, and Osvaldo Ríos (loose adaptation)
- Los hilos del pasado – Mexico (2025) with Yadhira Carrillo, Bárbara López, Emmanuel Palomares, and Eduardo Santamarina (loose adaptation)

==== La mujer que no podía amar ====
- Monte calvario – Mexico (1986) with Edith González, Arturo Peniche, and José Alonso
- Te sigo amando – Mexico (1997) with Claudia Ramírez, Luis José Santander, and Sergio Goyri
- La que no podía amar – Mexico (2011) with Ana Brenda Contreras, José Ron, and Jorge Salinas
- Amanecer – Mexico (2025) with Livia Brito, Fernando Colunga, Daniel Elbittar and Ana Belena

=== Adapted ===
==== Mi hermana gemela by Delia González Márquez ====
- Mi hermana gemela – Venezuela (1975) with Lupita Ferrer and José Bardina

==== Wuthering Heights by Emily Brontë ====
- Cumbres Borrascosas – Venezuela (1976) with Elluz Peraza and José Bardina

==== Laura y Virginia by Enrique Jarnes ====
- Laura y Virginia – Venezuela (1977) with Mary Soliani, Alejandra Pinedo, and Luis Abreu

==== Pobre diabla by Alberto Migré ====
- Pobre diabla – Argentina–Venezuela (1990) with Jeannette Rodríguez and Osvaldo Laport
- Pobre diabla – Peru (2000) with Angie Cepeda, Salvador del Solar, Arnaldo André, Rossana Fernández Maldonado, and Vanessa Saba

== Awards ==
A "Goddess of Telenovelas" award was created in Fiallo's name at the 9th annual Summit of the Telenovela Industry in 2011.
