= Todo por tu amor =

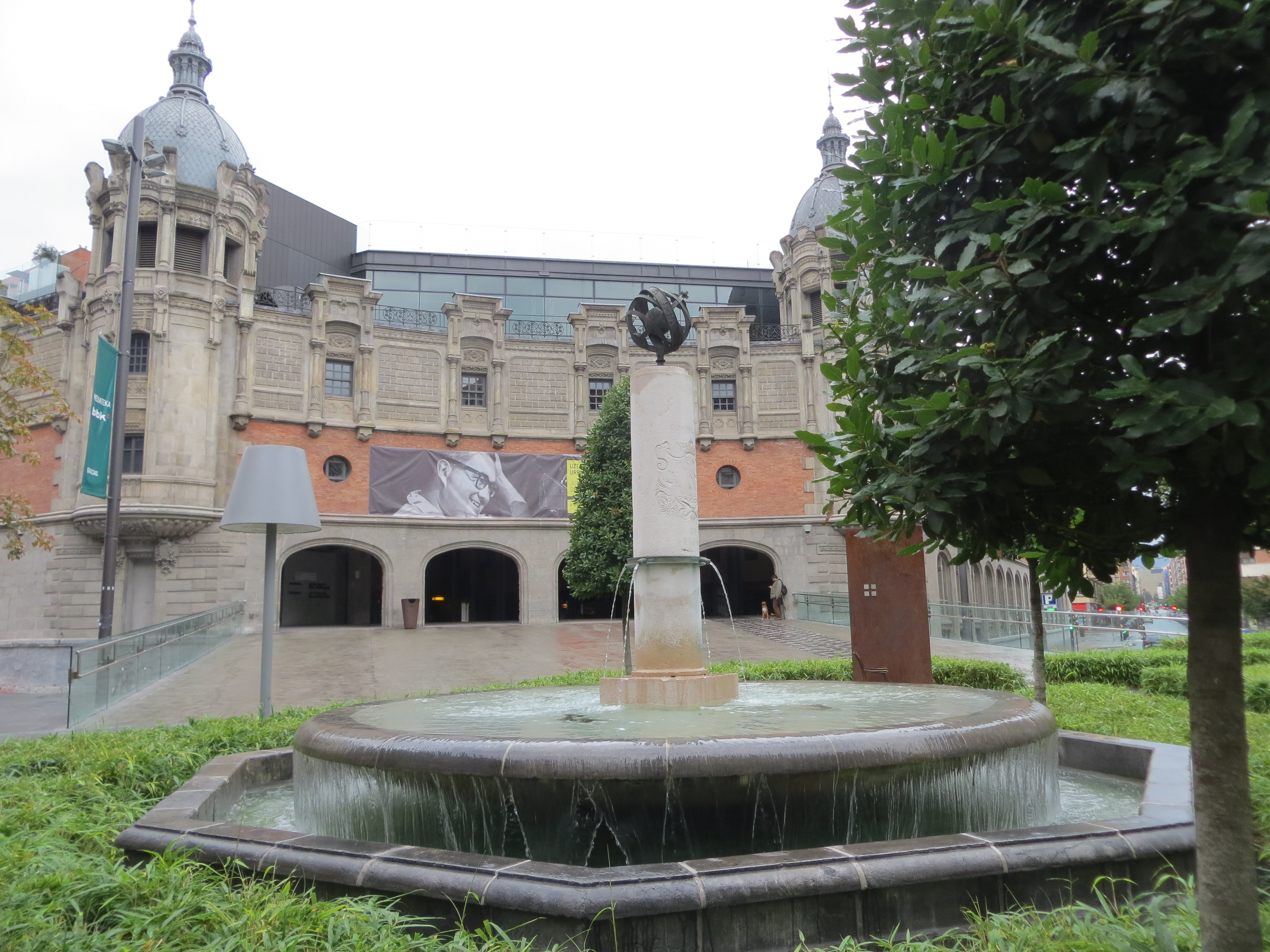
- A filming location
- Genre: Telenovela; Romance; Drama
- Created by: Delia Fiallo
- Written by: Alberto Gómez
- Directed by: Edgar Liendo
- Starring: Jeannette Rodríguez; Jean Carlo Simancas; Hilda Abrahamz; Gabriela Spanic
- Opening theme: Todo por tu Amor by Raquel Castaños
- Country of origin: Venezuela
- Original language: Spanish
- No. of episodes: 150

Production
- Executive producer: Sandra Rioboo
- Production location: Caracas
- Editor: Orlando Manzo
- Running time: 45 minutes
- Production company: Venevisión

Original release
- Network: Venevisión
- Release: January 22 – July 8, 1997

Todo por tu amor (English title: Everything for Your Love) is a Venezuelan telenovela produced by Venevisión in 1997. It was developed by Alberto Gómez based on the original story of the telenovela Ligia Sandoval written by Delia Fiallo.

On January 22, 1997, Venevisión started broadcasting Todo por tu amor weekdays at 9:00pm, replacing Sol de tentación. The last episode was broadcast on July 8, 1997, with Contra viento y marea replacing it the following day.

Jeannette Rodríguez and Jean Carlo Simancas starred as the main protagonists, while Hilda Abrahamz and Gabriela Spanic starred as antagonists.

== Plot ==
Marina Rangel is a young physical therapist struggling to support her family by working at a public hospital. Here, she will meet Dr. Samuel Montalbán, and this is where all her troubles will begin. Dr. Samuel forms an instant dislike for Marina and finds an excuse to have her fired. Finding herself jobless and desperate, Marina finds a job as a nurse in a private home caring for a woman who has recently become blind. However, her patient is none other than Andrea, Samuel's frustrated and conniving wife who makes everyone around her, especially Marina, suffer due to her handicap.

It is in the middle of this conflict that Marina and Samuel form a passionate bond of love, but their happiness will face many challenges. Andrea recovers her sight but hides this from Samuel in order to keep him at her side. Also, Marina's former lover comes back into her life, and it turns out that he is Samuel's brother. But when he is murdered by a jealous lover, Marina is accused of the crime. Believing that she killed his brother, Samuel abandons Marina. Years later, Marina, now married to another man, meets Samuel who assures her that their feelings for each other are over. But is it?

== Cast ==
- Jeannette Rodríguez as Marina Rangel
- Jean Carlo Simancas as Samuel Montalbán
- Julio Alcazar as Álvaro Villagrande
- Hilda Abrahamz as Andrea Mijares
- Gabriela Spanic as Amaranta Rey
- Monica Rubio as Lucy Rangel
- Eduardo Luna as Tony Magallanes
- Carlos Arreaza as Larry Mijares
- Eva Moreno as Gisela
- Marta Olivo as Elodia Rangel
- Carolina López as Coral Machado
- Romelia Aguedo as Delfina
- Orlando Cassin as Padre Chucho
- Carlos Flores as Chucho Magallanes
- Alba Valve as Teté Magallanes
- Luis Enrique Cañas as Luis Carlos
- Jorge Aravena as Cristóbal Pérez
- Herminia Martínez as Ángela Zavala viuda de Villagrande
- Luis Gerardo Nuñez
- Inés María Calero as Irene Carvajal
- Dulce María Piloneta as Gloria
- Francisco Ferrari
- Ramón Hinojosa as Don Lechuga
- Ana Martínez as Sebastiana
- Ivette Domínguez as Carlota
- Antonio Machuca as Gamboa
- Víctor Hernández as Memo
- Ernesto Balzi as Renato
- Jorge Palacios as Padre Marcelo
- Raúl Amundaray as Daniel
- Jose Ángel Dávila as El Baby
- Raquel Castaños
- Servando Primera
- Florentino Primera
