= Lucecita =

Lucecita may refer to:

- Lucecita (TV series), a Venezuelan telenovela
- Lucecita Benítez, also known as Lucecita, Puerto Rican singer
