= Esmeralda (Brazilian TV series) =

- Created by: Original story: Delia Fiallo; Adaptation for SBT: Henrique Zambelli; Rogério Garcia
- Based on: Esmeralda by Delia Fiallo
- Directed by: Jacques Lagôa; Luiz Antônio Piá
- Starring: Bianca Castanho; Cláudio Lins; Tânia Bondezan; Karina Barum; Lucinha Lins; Paulo César Grande; Manoelita Lustosa; Antônio Petrin; Delano Avelar; Olivetti Herrera; Daniel Andrade see more
- Opening theme: Ela é Um Anjo (Esmeralda) by Br'oz
- Country of origin: Brazil
- Original language: Portuguese
- No. of episodes: 194 (135 international version)

Production
- Production location: Brazil
- Running time: 60 minutes

Original release
- Network: SBT
- Release: 6 December 2004 – 19 July 2005

Related
- Seus Olhos; Os Ricos também Choram; Esmeralda (original series)

Esmeralda is a Brazilian telenovela produced and broadcast by SBT in 2004 and 2005. It was based on the 1970 Venezuelan telenovela of same name by Delia Fiallo.

== Cast ==
- Bianca Castanho as Esmeralda Álvares Real
- Cláudio Lins as José Armando Álvares Real
- Tânia Bondezan as Fátima Álvares Real
- Karina Barum as Graziella Álvares Real
- Daniel Andrade as Adrián Lucero
- Lucinha Lins as Branca Álvares Real
- Paulo César Grande as Rodolfo Álvares Real
- Manoelita Lustosa as Rosário
- Sônia Guedes as Margarida
- Delano Avelar as Dr. Lúcio Malavér
- Olivetti Herrera as Dr. Álvaro Lafaieti
- Cleide Queiroz as Emanuela
- Josmar Martins as Firmino
- Jardel Mello as Dionísio Lucero
- Marco Lunez as Januário
- Carol Hubner as Joana
- Cyda Baú as Jacinta
- Pedro Paulley as Inácio
- Priscila Ferreira as Florysa "Florzinha" Lucero
- Antônio Petrin as Sabiá
- Fabiana Alvarez as Patrícia
- Renato Scarpin as Dr. Marcelo
- Nara Gomes as Socorro
- Graça Berman as Hortência
- Cris Bessa as Aurora
- Mário Sérgio Pretini as Dr. Bernardo
- Carl Schumacher as Dr. Fausto
- Luís Carlos Bahia as Cláudio
- Débora Gomez as Dóris
- Domingos Meira as Daniel
- Ruth Romcy as Betânia
- Patrícia Vilela as Hilda
- Maria Estela as Irmã Piedade
- Patrícia Salvador as Pietra
- Daniela Franco as Márcia
- Bibi Menegon as Amélia
- Tallyta Cardoso as Tânia
- Fabiana Meireles as Irmã Lucila
- Nirce Levin as Rita
- João Bourbonnais as Gustavo

== Other versions ==
- (Venezuela) Esmeralda - a Venezuelan telenovela produced by José Enrique Crousillat for Venevisión in 1970.
- (Venezuela) Topacio - a Venezuelan telenovela produced by Jorge Gherardi and Omar Pin for RCTV in 1984.
- (Mexico) Esmeralda - a Mexican telenovela produced by Salvador Mejía Alejandre for Televisa in 1997.
- (Mexico) Sin tu mirada - In 2017 Televisa returned to make another more modern version of the story.
