= Liliana Rodríguez (actress) =

- Born: Liliana Rodríguez Morillo; April 26, 1967 (age 59); Caracas, Venezuela
- Origin: Venezuela
- Occupations: Singer, actress, hostess
- Years active: 1989-present

Liliana Rodríguez Morillo (born April 26, 1967 in Caracas) is a Venezuelan singer, songwriter, actress and television host. She is the daughter of singer and actress Lila Morillo and famous singer José Luis Rodríguez "El Puma", and older sister of Lilibeth Morillo. In the US she is known for appearances on We.TV's 2016 show My Life is a Telenovela with Maria Raquenel Portillo, Venezuelan actor Enrique Sapene, Mexican actor Gustavo Pedraza and former Sábado Gigante co-host Alina Robert.

== Biography ==
Liliana was part of the cast of the telenovela Maribel alongside her younger sister and mother Lila Morillo.

== Filmography ==
=== Television ===
| Year | Title | Role |
|---|---|---|
| 1989 | Maribel | |
| 1991-1992 | Mundo de fieras | Chinca |
| 1992 | Macarena (telenovela) | |
| 1994- 1993 | Sal y Pimienta | Aguacerito |
| 1995-1996 | Morelia | Lulú Esqueda |
| 2002-2003 | Gata salvaje | Francisca "Panchita" López |
| 2005 | Amarte así | Anunciación Reyes |
| 2006 | Tierra de pasiones | Lourdes "Lulú" Aguilar |
| 2006-2007 | Las dos caras de Ana | Catalina "Kathy" Magaña |
| 2011 | Sacrificio de mujer | Alberta Garrido |
| 2012 | Mi ex me tiene ganas | Martha Skott |
| 2012-2013 | Rosario | Ofilia Elsa |
| 2013-2014 | Cosita linda | Camila "La Chata" |
| 2013 | 11-11: En mi cuadra nada cuadra | Tía Lucrecia |
