= Esmeralda (Venezuelan TV series) =

1970 telenovela

- Genre: Telenovela
- Story by: Delia Fiallo
- Directed by: Grazio D'Angelo
- Starring: Lupita Ferrer; José Bardina
- Opening theme: "Las flores que me diste" by Lupita Ferrer
- Country of origin: Venezuela
- Original language: Spanish

Production
- Executive producer: José Enrique Crousillat
- Running time: 60 minutes

Original release
- Network: Venevisión
- Release: 1970 – 1971

Related
- Topacio (1985); Esmeralda (1997); Esmeralda (2004); Sin tu mirada (2017)

Esmeralda is a 1970 Venezuelan telenovela produced by José Enrique Crousillat and directed by Grazio D’Angelo for Venevisión. It is based on an original story written by the Cuban Writer Delia Fiallo. The telenovela starred Lupita Ferrer and José Bardina as main characters.

== Cast ==
- Lupita Ferrer as Esmeralda Rivera
- José Bardina as Juan Pablo Peñalver
- Ada Riera as Graciela Peñalver
- Eva Blanco as Blanca
- Ivonne Attas as Silvia Zamora
- Esperanza Magaz as Dominga
- Orángel Delfín as Marcos Malaver
- Néstor Zavarce as Adrián Lucero
- Hugo Pimentel as Rogelio Peñalver
- Libertad Lamarque as Sister Piedad

== International adaptation ==
The first adaptation of the telenovela is Topacio, produced by the Venezuelan television channel Radio Caracas Televisión in 1985. In 1997 Televisa produced a version with the same name starring Leticia Calderón. In 2004, the Brazilian channel SBT also produced a version with the same name. In 2017 Televisa returned to make another more modern version of the story, entitled Sin tu mirada.
