= Ligia Sandoval =

- Genre: Telenovela
- Created by: Delia Fiallo
- Directed by: Grazio D'Angelo
- Starring: Lupita Ferrer; José Bardina
- Opening theme: "Si no estuvieras tú" by Mirla Castellanos
- Country of origin: Venezuela
- Original language: Spanish
- No. of episodes: 59

Production
- Executive producer: Tabaré Pérez
- Production location: Caracas
- Running time: 60 minutes

Original release
- Network: Venevision
- Release: 1981 – 1981

Related
- La señorita Elena (1975); Atrévete (1986); Vivo por Elena (1998)

Ligia Sandoval is a 1981 Venezuelan telenovela written by Delia Fiallo and Ana Mercedes Escamez and produced by Venevision. Lupita Ferrer and José Bardina starred as the main protagonists.

== Plot ==
Ligia Sandoval is a young woman who becomes the victim of an irresponsible man who leaves her with a young son. She moves in with her godmother and younger sister, with everyone in their humble neighborhood believing that the boy is their younger brother. Meanwhile, Luis Gerardo is a doctor who becomes the victim of a young socialite called Lissete who tricks him into marriage. Their marriage is a disaster and Luis decides to divorce her. But Lissete gets into a car accident which leaves her blind. Ligia gets a job at the hospital where Luis works, but she gets fired after a mix-up with the media. Later, Ligia gets a job as Lissete's nurse, and there is constant tension between her and Luis. But they later fall in love with each other. Lissete who has now regained her sight, pretends to be blind in order to cling to Luis. Things get complicated with the arrival of Freddy, Luis Gerardo's brother who is the father of Ligia's son.

== Cast ==
- Lupita Ferrer
- José Bardina
- Diego Acuña
- Olga Castillo
- Luis Colmenares
- Manuel Escolano
- Myrian Ochoa
- Renee de Pallas
