= Lucinha Lins =

Brazilian actress and singer-songwriter

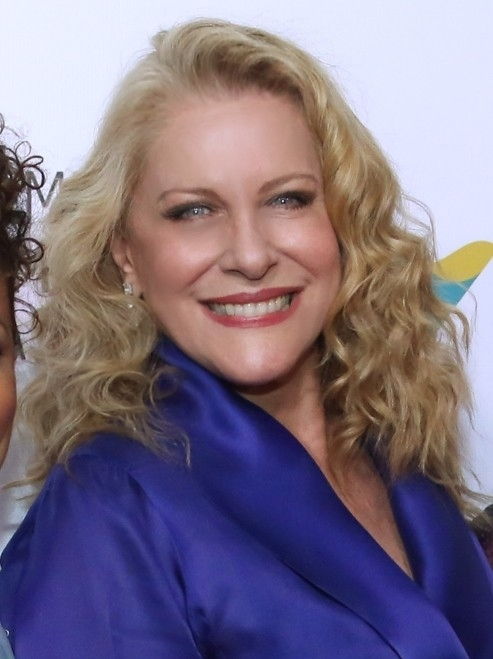
- Lins in 2015
- Born: Lúcia Maria Werner Viana; Rio de Janeiro, Brazil
- Years active: 1979–present
- Spouses: Ivan Lins (m. 1971; div. 1982) Cláudio Tovar (m. 1983)
- Children: 4, including Cláudio

Lúcia Maria Werner Viana, better known as Lucinha Lins, is a Brazilian actress and singer-songwriter.

== Career ==
Lucinha became first known by the public in the 1979 Rede Globo series Plantão de Polícia, pioneer in issues such as homosexuality and drug traffic on the Brazilian television. Two years later, she became recognized as a singer, after she won the Shell Music Festival performing Jerônimo Jardim's "Purpurina".

In 1980, she duetted with Rio superstar Jorge Ben on the track 'Georgia e Jorge' on his Alô, alô, Como Vai? album.

In 1984, Lucinha starred on the Globo miniseries Rabo-de-Saia. To promote her role, she posed nude for the August issue of Playboy. On the following year, she starred in Dias Gomes' Roque Santeiro, the highest rated telenovela in the history of Brazil, as the virgin widow of the title character, portrayed by José Wilker. In 1989, she starred in O Salvador da Pátria, which was accused by some of having an anti-Lula bias.

From 1991 to 1994, she had minor roles on Globo productions. She then decided to leave Globo to act in two SBT telenovelas, As Pupilas do Senhor Reitor and Sangue do Meu Sangue. In 1996, she acted on Rede Record's Perdidos de Amor. In 1997 she returned to Globo, to star on the third season of teen series Malhação. In 1999 she would return to Record to act on Tiro e Queda. In 2001 she returned to Globo, where she starred in Estrela Guia, alongside pop singer Sandy. She would also act on the network's Chocolate com Pimenta in 2003.

In 2004, she left Globo to star as Blanca on the SBT adaptation of Televisa's Esmeralda. Two years later, she signed with Record. Her first role on the network was on the controversial Vidas Opostas, which was the first telenovela in Brazil shot at a favela. Two years later, she would star as Vilma, the pyromaniac villain of Chamas da Vida, the network's current 10 p.m. telenovela. The first antagonist of her career has been acclaimed by both critics and public.

== Personal life ==
Lucinha was married to MPB singer-songwriter Ivan Lins from 1971 to 1982. They had two children together, one of whom, Cláudio, is also an actor and singer. Lins let Lucinha keep his last name, for which she initially became recognized, after they got divorced. Since the early 1980s, Lucinha maintains a domestic partnership with fellow actor Cláudio Tovar, father of her only daughter Beatriz. On 30 September 2008, she became a grandmother.

== TV roles ==
Telenovelas

- 1985: Roque Santeiro as Mocinha
- 1989: O Salvador da Pátria as Ângela
- 1991: O Dono do Mundo as Vanda
- 1992: Despedida de Solteiro as Marta
- 1993: Fera Ferida as Laurinda Mota da Costa
- 1994: A Viagem as Estela
- 1994: As Pupilas do Senhor Reitor as Magali do Porto
- 1995: Sangue do Meu Sangue as Helena Rezende
- 1996: Perdidos de Amor as Lali
- 1997: Malhação as Bárbara
- 1998: Corpo Dourado as Hilda
- 1999: Tiro e Queda as Isabel
- 2001: Estrela-Guia as Lucrécia Espíndola
- 2003: Chocolate com Pimenta as Elvira Rodrigues Albuquerque
- 2004: Esmeralda as Branca
- 2006: Vidas Opostas as Ísis Campobello
- 2008: Chamas da Vida as Vilma Oliveira Santos
- 2011: Vidas em Jogo as Alzira Duarte Monteiro (Zizi)
- 2014: Vitória as Zulmira Nogueira (Zuzu)
- 2017: O Rico e Lázaro as Zelfa
- 2017: Apocalipse as Lía

Ministries

- 1984: Rabo-de-Saia as Santinha

Series

- 1979: Plantão de Polícia as Gisela
- 1981: Sítio do Picapau Amarelo as Rapunzel
- 1991: Mundo da Lua as Roberta
