= La Zulianita =

- Genre: Telenovela; Drama
- Created by: Delia Fiallo
- Directed by: Grazio D'Angelo
- Starring: Lupita Ferrer; José Bardina; Renee de Pallas; Chelo Rodríguez
- Opening theme: "La Zulianita" by Willy Chirino
- Country of origin: Venezuela
- Original language: Spanish
- No. of episodes: 235

Production
- Executive producer: José Enrique Crousillat
- Production locations: Zulia; Caracas
- Production company: Venevisión

Original release
- Network: Venevisión
- Release: 5 January – 7 November 1977

Related
- Maria de nadie (1986); Maribel (1989); Morelia (1994); Un Refugio para el Amor (2012)

La Zulianita is a Venezuelan telenovela written by Cuban writer Delia Fiallo and produced by Venevisión in 1977.

Lupita Ferrer and José Bardina starred as the main protagonists with Chelo Rodríguez as the antagonist.

== Plot ==
María Marta Domínguez is a humble provincial girl from Zulia who goes to Caracas in search of new and better opportunities, though she does not possess skills to help her land a job. When she reaches Caracas, she stays with her cousin who works as a prostitute in a bar called "La Zulianita". One night, while working at the bar, an unscrupulous client called Lastra who is the Zulianita Promotions Specialties, tries to take advantage of María, but she defends herself. Outraged, Lastra accuses her of stealing his wallet. María is sent to jail, but is soon released through the help of Claudio Linares, a kind lawyer dedicated to helping people who have no resources, since he too was imprisoned unjustly.

María gets a job at the home of the Arocha's, a wealthy family in the city. The family is composed of Felipe Arocha, his wife Amelia, their children Juan Carlos who is an engineer, Jesus and Jenny, his aunt Olga and her children Diana and Tony. Back in the house, María meets and falls for Juan Carlos, although Claudio, who has since become a close friend to María, advises her that this family cannot be trusted because they sent him to jail accusing him of the death of his wife and daughter. María and Juan Carlos started a romance, and he breaks off his engagement to his girlfriend Idania Ferran.

== Cast ==
- Lupita Ferrer as Martha María Domínguez
- José Bardina as Juan Carlos Arocha y Pimentel
- Chelo Rodríguez as Idania Ferrán
- Enrique Soto as Aquiles
- Orlando Urdaneta as Rafael
- Luis Abreu as Jesús
- Caridad Canelón as Dorita
- Eva Blanco as Olga
- José Luis Silva as Roly
- Martín Lantigua as Franco
- Eduardo Serrano as Hernán
- Esperanza Magaz as Matilde
- Ana Castell as Queta
- Enrique Alzugaray as Papelón
- Ivonne Attas as Rosa Francia
- Haydée Balza as Greta
- Marita Capote as Linda
- Martha Carbillo as Mechita
- Olga Castillo as Morocota
- Willy Chirino as Él mismo
- Sandra Dalton as Felisia
- Renee de Pallas as Amelia de Arocha
- Chela D'Gar as Migdalia
- Elisa Escámez as Nury
- Elena Fariaz ... Carmita
- Fernando Flores as Elin
- Humberto García as Oscar Chacón
- Gustavo González as El Tuerto
- María Hinojosa as María
- Martha Lancaste as Madame Yolan
- Jesús Maella as Aurelio Domínguez
- Herminia Martínez as Saby
- Juan Manuel Montesinos as Médico
- Héctor Monteverde as Felipe Arocha
- Flor Núñez as Aidé
- José Oliva as Fermín
- Omar Omaña as Tony
- Margot Pareja as Inocencia
- Alejandra Pinedo as Jenny Arocha
- Manuel Poblete as Leyva
- Leopoldo Regnault as David
- Soledad Rojas as Olaya
- Fernanda Ruizos as Alexia Arocha Ferrán
- Augusto Romero as Juan Carlitos
- Chumico Romero as Corito
- Betty Ruth as Julia
- Mary Soliani as Diana
- Carlos Subero as Claudio Linares
- Alfonso Urdaneta as Nicolás
- Franklin Virgüez as David
- Raúl Xiqués as Ricardo Lastra
