= Sin tu mirada =

Mexican telenovela

- Genre: Telenovela
- Created by: Gabriela Ortigoza
- Based on: Esmeralda by Delia Fiallo
- Written by: Ricardo Tejeda; Félix Cortés; Gerardo Sánchez; Elizabeth Salazar; Alejandro Orive; Olivia Reyes; Marco Rodríguez
- Screenplay by: Gabriela Ortigoza
- Story by: Delia Fiallo
- Directed by: Ana Lorena Perez-Ríos; Sandra Schiffner; Eduardo Said
- Creative director: Daniela Rojas
- Starring: Claudia Martín; Osvaldo de León; Ana Martín; Claudia Ramírez; Luz Elena González; Eduardo Santamarina
- Theme music composer: Jorge Eduardo Murguía; Mauricio Arriaga
- Opening theme: "No te separes de mí" by Sofía Reyes
- Country of origin: Mexico
- Original language: Spanish
- No. of seasons: 1
- No. of episodes: 112

Production
- Executive producer: Ignacio Sada Madero
- Producer: Arturo Pedraza
- Cinematography: Maria de los Ángeles Márquez
- Editor: Israel Flores Ordaz
- Camera setup: Vivian Sánchez Ross; Martha Montúfar; Luis Monroy
- Production company: Televisa

Original release
- Network: Las Estrellas
- Release: November 13, 2017 – April 15, 2018

Related
- Topacio (1985); Esmeralda (1997); Esmeralda (2004)

Sin tu mirada (English: Sightless Love) is a Mexican telenovela premiered on Las Estrellas on November 13, 2017, and concluded on April 15, 2018. Produced for Televisa by Ignacio Sada Madero. The telenovela revolves around Marina, a blind woman who because of her disability, has developed a great sensitivity.

== Plot ==
On a stormy night, Marina is born, apparently without life, who is received by Damiana (Cecilia Toussaint), the village midwife, who a few hours before attended the delivery of a healthy child, but unfortunately his mother died. Don Luis (Eduardo Santamarina), the father of Marina, has since married Prudencia (Claudia Ramírez), lives determined to have a son, wants an heir that transcends his illustrious surname Ocaranza. Unfortunately, Prudencia can not have children, which makes Angustias (Ana Martín) her nana convince her to benefit the family with the child who was orphaned as a mother. Thanks to this, Luis Alberto is received in a new family, where he grows surrounded by a lot of money and travels abroad to study a medical career. Meanwhile, Marina (Claudia Martín), miraculously survives and grows happy surrounded by nature next to Damiana, who teaches her to know the world in a different way, because she is blind. But as Marina grows up the doctor Isauro (Carlos de la Mota) come to town, who teaches her to read and to write and to prepare her life to being the assistant in his medical office.

An accident causes the house of Damiana burst into flames with Marina inside. Isauro without thinking, enters the hut to save her and his face is disfigured. The kind, gentle and handsome Dr. Isauro, from this moment, becomes a resentful, selfish man. A hermit who only allows and enjoys the company of Marina. The Ocaranza return to the ranch. Prudencia asks her nanny to find her daughter's grave. Angustias locates Damiana, but she refuses to confess the truth. What she wanted to tell them was that the girl did not die, but they had left and she did not agree to give up Marina, since after more than 20 years they finally came to take an interest in her. Marina has a great friend named Toribio (Luis Bayardo), although he is an older adult, his spirit is of an 8-year-old child. Toribio loves her and has always been her playmate. One day of those fun for both, Marina and Toribio are scared to hear a bullet. Toribio fled to hide, but Marina ran into Luis Alberto (Osvaldo de León), and asked him not to kill, hurt and scare the animals that had not done anything. Alberto is very impressed with the girl and tries to approach her, but Marina does not allow it, until one day they meet again, Alberto promises never to take a gun again. A beautiful feeling that nobody knew, grows between Marina and Alberto. The attraction is so intense that in an accident that brings them too close, they kiss on the lips and with the soul. Alberto reacts and feels terrible because he's Vanessa's (Scarlet Gruber) boyfriend for several years. He apologizes to Marina, tells her it was a mistake and says goodbye. Marina does not understand that for Alberto it is a mistake what for her was the most beautiful of her life.

Alberto tries futilely to continue with his life, but Marina caught his heart. Alberto decides to end his relationship with Vanessa, which she does not accept, because she is pressured by Susana (Luz Elena González), her mother, to be his desire. A marriage is expected and demanded by both families. Alberto's parents reject the idea of their son getting involved with a blind village girl who they mistreat and humiliate as an upstart, but the love of Alberto and Marina is immense, so they get married secretly and when she is presented as his wife, the conflict is so great, that Damiana reveals the exchange of children. Don Luis refuses to believe that he has a blind daughter and rejects her.

After Isauro finds out about the wedding of Luis Alberto and Marina, he tells Marina, who having married another man who is not him, that he has always loved her and risked his life to save her. After this strong argument Marina gets sick and Isauro decides to give her a medicine to calm her down, but she only sleeps and he uses her to his advantage. Marina wakes in bed with him and he tells her that she had sex with him. Marina tells Luis Alberto this and he refuses to have a child as a result of a rape, so they both separate, and decide to follow their path each one by the others side. Some time after Marina meets Ricardo Bazán (Juan Martín Jauregui), an ophthalmologist who helps her undergo an operation, and to be able to achieve, the first thing she sees is the smile of her son Rafael. Later Marina discovers that Luis Alberto has always been close to her, since they work in the same place, but thanks to Lucrecía (Candela Márquez), the new girlfriend of Luis Alberto, who will do anything possible to separate them, with the help of Ricardo who has also fallen in love with Marina.

== Cast ==
=== Main ===
- Claudia Martín as Marina Ríos
- Osvaldo de León as Luis Alberto
- Ana Martín as Angustias Galvéz
- Claudia Ramírez as Prudencia Arzuaga
- Luz Elena González as Susana Balmaceda
- Eduardo Santamarina as Don Luis Alberto

=== Also main ===
- Carlos de la Mota as Isauro Sotero
- Cecilia Toussaint as Damiana Ríos
- Luis Bayardo as Toribio Guzmán
- Ignacio Guadalupe as Baldomero
- Sergio Reynoso as Margarito Prieto
- Pablo Bracho as Zacarías
- Alejandra Jurado as Ramona
- Emmanuel Orenday as Paulino Prieto
- Ilse Ikeda as Yolanda Prieto
- Scarlet Gruber as Vanessa Villoslada
- Juan Martín Jauregui as Ricardo Bazan
- Candela Márquez as Lucrecia Zamudio

=== Recurring ===
- Lourdes Munguía as Cristina
- Olivia Bucio as Encarnación
- Humberto Elizondo as Horacio Zamudio

=== Special participation ===
- Isela Vega as Dominga
- Catalina López as Eulalia Hernández

== Production ==
Production began on September 15, 2017. The telenovela is an original story of Delia Fiallo, adapted by Gabriela Ortigoza based on the 1970 Venezuelan telenovela titled Esmeralda, and at the same time it is an adaptation of the 1997 Mexican telenovela starring Leticia Calderón, entitled Esmeralda. A total of 110 episodes were confirmed.

=== Filming ===
The telenovela is recorded in locations such as Valle de Bravo and in Mexico City.

=== Casting ===
On August 28, 2017, TVyNovelas magazine confirmed Claudia Martin and Osvaldo de León as main characters. On September 7, 2017 was confirmed debut of the Venezuelan actress Scarlet Gruber on Televisa as main villain of the telenovela. On October 10, 2017 Univision page confirmed Luz Elena González as the main villain. On October 7, 2017, the mass was celebrated for the beginning of the production, where the rest of the cast was confirmed as Ana Martín, Eduardo Santamarina, Cecilia Toussaint, Claudia Ramírez and Carlos de la Mota.

== Episodes ==
No.	Title	Original release date
1	"Angustias y Damiana comparten un gran secreto"	November 13, 2017
Years ago in Valle de Bravo, Prudencia and Luis await a longed-for son who bears his father's surname, after a news received by Luis that in La Añoranza a plague has infected the entire harvest, he decides to go to town to solve the problems. When arriving at the town the birth of Marina approaches, meanwhile Eulalia gives birth to Luis Alberto, but during the childbirth Eulalia dies, with the help of Damiana, Prudencia gives birth to a girl that apparently is born dead. Angustias at hearing that Damiana was talking about a child who was orphaned, decides to ask Damiana to change the babies. After this Dominga realizes that the girl who had apparently been born dead survived.
2	"Isauro queda desfigurado"	November 14, 2017
When leaving the hospital, Isauro takes a bad attitude to see that his face has been completely disfigured. Little by little, with the help of Marina, Isauro returns to his activities as village doctor and turns Marina into his assistant.
3	"Alberto se entera que Marina es ciega"	November 15, 2017
Alberto challenges Paulino to a horse race and on the way he runs into Marina, the noise of the horse frightens Marina and falls to the ground. Alberto tries to help her, but Paulino stops him and warns him to stay away from Marina, since she is blind.
4	"Marina y Alberto se hacen amigos"	November 16, 2017
Alberto looks for Marina again and this time asks for an opportunity to get to know each other better, Marina hesitates for a moment, since it is the owner's son who asks her to be friends. Finally, Marina ends up accepting and the connection between the two becomes magical.
5	"Vanessa llega a La Añoranza"	November 17, 2017
Vanessa along with her mother arrive in surprise at La Añoranza and find out that Alberto will have a big party. Vanessa decides to go out to look for her boyfriend inside the ranch and in the stables she runs into Paulino, their meeting becomes tense, since Vanessa behaves quite a despot with him.
6	"Marina recibe su primer beso"	November 20, 2017
Marina and Alberto have once again a moment alone and without being able to avoid it, they kiss having a great connection. Alberto realizes his impulse and apologizes to Marina.
7	"Don Luis corre a Marina de sus tierras"	November 21, 2017
Marina decides to go looking for Alberto at La Añoranza and on the way she meets Don Luis. Being despotic and very rude, Don Luis warns Marina that he does not want to see her in his lands, nor in the life of his son, since he will soon marry a beautiful woman.
8	"Alberto rompe el corazón de Marina"	November 22, 2017
Despite the warnings of Damiana and Paulino, Marina suffers her first love disappointment because of Alberto. Don Luis realizes the problem that Marina can become and asks Alberto to forget about her, otherwise he will take care of disappearing her.
9	"Prudencia conoce a Marina"	November 23, 2017
Prudencia meets with Marina in the church and decides to approach her. Marina is surprised to perceive that Prudencia is a good person and both feel a strange connection that invades them with joy and peace.
10	"Vanessa y Paulino se besan"	November 24, 2017
The riding lessons between Paulino and Vanessa continue. In a fit, Paulino decides to approach Vanessa and both kiss with great passion. Vanessa realizes her mistake and tries to run away on a horse, but when she does not know how to ride, she falls and hurts her ankle.
11	"Alberto se compromete con Vanessa"	November 27, 2017
Vanessa's birthday arrives and Alberto decides to surprise her with the engagement ring she so desperately wanted. Both Vanessa and her mother Susana jump of emotion, since in less than a month she will become Mrs. Ocaranza.
12	"Paulino le confiesa sus sentimientos a Vanessa"	November 28, 2017
Vanessa decides to find Paulino to find out if she is the reason that he is leaving the ranch. Paulino confesses his true feelings and lets her know that he has never fallen in love with a woman before. After listening to his relief, Vanessa asks Paulino not to leave the ranch.
13	"Nace el amor entre Alberto y Marina"	November 29, 2017
Alberto can not stop his impulses and ends up confessing to Marina that he is in love with her. Marina is excited to learn that Alberto corresponds to their feelings and together they decide to fight for that great love they feel.
14	"Angustias ve los aretes de Marina"	November 30, 2017
During the town fair, Marina wears her beautiful earrings and Angustias manages to see them. When noticing that they are Prudence's earrings, Angustias becomes restless and questions Marina to find out how she got them.
15	"Alberto enfrenta a su padre"	December 1, 2017
Alberto is upset with his father for being so cruel to Marina, so he demands that he apologize to her. Don Luis takes the attitude of Alberto as a lack of respect and warns him that if he does not keep his word to get away from Marina, he will take charge of disappearing her.
16	"Isauro y Alberto discuten por culpa de Marina"	December 4, 2017
Alberto goes to Isauro's office to find out if Marina has any chance of recovering her sight. Isauro receives him in a rude way and asks him to stop looking for Marina, since she will never be able to see again.
17	"Angustias defiende a Marina"	December 5, 2017
Angustias does not measure the risk and faces Don Luis to defend Marina. Without telling him the truth, Angustias asks him to respect Marina, since everything he does against her will be returned and his conscience will soon demand it.
18	"Susana y Vanessa están en la quiebra"	December 6, 2017
Susana pressures Vanessa to insist on marrying Alberto, since their economic situation is serious and they can soon live in misery. For Susana, the Ocaranza are her only hope of regaining her social status, so she asks Vanessa to reconquer Alberto's love and not let him go with Marina.
19	"Alberto lleva a Marina a la ciudad"	December 7, 2017
Alberto decides to fulfill his promise to take Marina to the city for an eye care specialist for a review and to have the ability to see.
20	"Marina tiene la esperanza de poder ver"	December 8, 2017
Marina is reviewed by Dr. Ricardo Bazán, seeing her is fascinated and commits to continue evaluating her case until he manages to find a cure for her blindness.
21	"Isauro delata a Marina"	December 11, 2017
Isauro takes revenge against Marina and reveals to Don Luis where he can find her. He also tells him the details of the secret relationship that exists between Marina and Alberto.
22	"Zacarías ataca a Damiana"	December 12, 2017
Damiana refuses to leave her home without Marina and struggles with Zacarias. Due to the force, she falls and suffers a spectacular accident.
23	"Susana intenta manipular a Luis"	December 13, 2017
Susana devises a plan and advises Luis to prevent Alberto from leaving the ranch, to achieve that he must show a more human side and not harm Marina any more.
24	"Marina y Alberto ya son novios"	December 14, 2017
Alberto decides to formalize his relationship with Marina and asks in front of everyone to accept being his girlfriend. Now together they will seek the approval of Don Luis in La Añoranza.
25	"Marina impresiona a los Ocaranza"	December 15, 2017
Marina's visit to Alberto's house was a success, both Susana and Luis were amazed at her beauty and education. Alberto thanks his parents for giving his girlfriend the opportunity to enter the family.
26	"Prudencia se interpone entre Marina y Alberto"	December 18, 2017
Concerned about her son, Prudencia decides to intervene by asking Marina to stay away from her son. Given this situation, Marina has no other choice and ends her relationship with Alberto.
27	"Marina acepta ser la esposa de Alberto"	December 19, 2017
Marina and Alberto try to say goodbye, but their love is so strong that they decide to surrender and be oneself. Alberto does not miss the wonderful moment and asks Marina to become his wife.
28	"Alberto se decepciona de Prudencia"	December 20, 2017
Prudencia confesses that she spoke with Marina to ask her to stay away from the Ocaranza. Upon hearing this Alberto is disappointed in his mother and asks her not to get into his life again.
29	"Marina y Alberto se casan"	December 21, 2017
With Yola and Baldomero witness Alberto and Marina agree to join their lives.
30	"Marina acepta vivir en La Añoranza"	December 22, 2017
Prudencia approaches Marina to apologize for her bad attitude. To correct her error, she asks for the opportunity to get to know each other better and offers her to live for a while in La Añoranza.
31	"Susana pretende humillar a Marina"	December 25, 2017
Upon her arrival at La Añoranza, Susana causes Marina to feel uncomfortable due to her blindness. With the help of Vanessa they plan to humiliate her so that Prudencia realizes that she is not a woman for her son.
32	"Luis se entera que Marina está en La Añoranza"	December 26, 2017
Zacarías intrigues Isauro to tell him that Prudencia lied to him, so he does not hesitate to call Luis to tell him that Marina is still the girlfriend of his son Alberto and is staying at La Añoranza.
33	"Luis e Isauro se unen para lastimar a Marina"	December 27, 2017
Luis takes Marina by force and takes her to Dr. Sotero's house. Isauro finds out that Marina got married and claims to have betrayed him. Resented with her, he decides to kidnap her.
34	"Isauro desea aprovecharse de Marina"	December 28, 2017
Obsessed to erase Alberto's caresses, Isauro keeps Marina sedated and tries to take advantage of her. Ramona manages to observe them from outside the room and is surprised to see them together in bed.
35	"Prudencia y Luis se enteran que Marina es su hija"	December 29, 2017
Angustias and Damiana reveal the truth about Marina's origin and ask Prudencia for forgiveness for having kept that great secret for years.
36	"Marina se entera que es una Ocaranza"	January 1, 2018
Alberto manages to take Marina to La Añoranza and Prudencia is in charge of confessing the truth about her origin. Now Marina knows that she is an Ocaranza and that her future will change.
37	"Alberto condiciona a Luis"	January 2, 2018
Alberto makes a deal with Luis and asks him to give Marina all the privileges she deserves as his daughter or else he will set up a scandal so that they will find out that he is not his heir.
38	"Marina denuncia el abuso de Isauro"	January 3, 2018
Marina finally dares to confess to Alberto that Dr. Sotero sexually abused her. Filled with rage, he decides to go and look for him to brutally beat him in front of everyone in town.
39	"Ramona es manipulada por Isauro"	January 4, 2018
Isauro becomes the victim in front of Ramona and manipulates her into believing that Marina is only trying to hurt him. His plan is for her to testify in his favor so that he can avoid the authorities and not be imprisoned.
40	"Susana le ofrece su ayuda a Isauro"	January 5, 2018
Susana visits Isauro at the hospital to offer her help and find a way to send Alberto to jail. While Marina is informed by the legal doctor that no evidence of rape was found against her.
41	"Luis confirma que Marina es su hija"	January 8, 2018
Alberto receives the DNA studies and confirms that Marina is an Ocaranza. Luis explodes when he finds out and refuses to accept her as his daughter.
42	"Marina está embarazada"	January 9, 2018
Marina receives the news of being pregnant and Alberto reacts in the worst way to think that the baby is not his.
43	"Alberto desconfía de Marina"	January 10, 2018
Alberto insists that Marina perform a test to confirm who is the father of her son. Marina is disappointed by his lack of confidence and begins to feel that her love is not as strong as she imagined.
44	"Damiana y Marina huyen a la ciudad"	January 11, 2018
Given the terrible behavior of Alberto, Marina decides to give up everything and go to Mexico City without saying anything to anyone. With the help of Damiana, she will try to get ahead to raise her son alone.
45	"Vanessa y Paulino se dicen adiós"	January 12, 2018
Vanessa leaves La Añoranza and goes to Paulino's house ready to say goodbye, when not entering it she asks Yola to give him her message, because her heart will not bear to say goodbye.
46	"Toribio encuentra a Marina"	January 15, 2018
Six months have passed and Alberto still does not know where his wife is. Toribio and Baldonero already live in the city and, without imagining it, they manage to reunite with Damiana and Marina.
47	"Alberto y Marina le ponen fin a su relación"	January 16, 2018
After six months Alberto is reunited with Marina and tries to solve his problems. Unfortunately nothing has changed and both decide not to be together again.
48	"Luis le pide a Marina que regale a su hijo"	January 17, 2018
Luis recommends to Marina that she get rid of her son or else she will lose Alberto's love. She rejects his proposal and makes it clear that she does not need the help of any Ocaranza to raise her baby.
49	"Alberto decide continuar su camino sin Marina"	January 18, 2018
Alberto believes that Marina no longer has an interest in saving his marriage, that is why he decides to continue alone and rebuild his life by dedicating himself exclusively to his profession as a doctor.
50	"Paulino y Marina deciden vivir juntos"	January 19, 2018
While he was singing in the street Paulino is reunited with his friends from the village and he proposes that they live together to be able to get ahead in the city.
51	"Alberto y Vanessa lo intentan de nuevo"	January 22, 2018
Alberto comes back to Vanessa now that his relationship with Marina has failed. Both decide to try again and announce to their families that they have retaken their courtship.
52	"Nace el bebé de Marina"	January 23, 2018
Marina enters labor in the middle of the market and Damiana must intervene. As a good midwife, the baby is born without complications.
53	"Susana logra seducir a Luis"	January 24, 2018
Susana dares to confess to Luis the strong attraction she feels to be with him. Both decide to let themselves be carried away by desire, as long as their relationship is secret.
54	"Vanessa sufre ante el desprecio de Paulino"	January 25, 2018
Tired of suffering humiliations, Paulino decides to renounce the love he feels for Vanessa, leaving her with a broken heart.
55	"Ricardo se convierte en una nueva esperanza para Marina"	January 26, 2018
Ricardo cites Marina in his office and proposes to start a treatment to recover her sight. Marina offers to pay little by little for Dr. Bazán's services and he gladly accepts to help her.
56	"Lucrecia se interesa en Alberto"	January 29, 2018
With the pretext of bringing him closer to her father, Lucrecia uses her charm to start seducing Alberto.
57	"Marina se somete a su primera operación"	January 30, 2018
Hoping to see his son, Marina puts herself in the hands of Dr. Bazán to correct her vision problem. When leaving the operation Marina is attacked by Isauro who is determined to get her love at all costs.
58	"Marina acepta la protección de Ricardo"	January 31, 2018
Frightened by Isauro's bad intentions, Marina agrees to receive the help of Dr. Ricardo to live some time in his house and continue her recovery.
59	"Margarito sufre un aparatoso accidente"	February 1, 2018
When trying to compose a fence in La Añoranza, Margarito slips and falls into a ravine. Zacarías tries to help him and transfers him to a hospital.
60	"Marina ve por la primera vez"	February 2, 2018
Marina's friends organize a meeting to celebrate that her operation was a success. With great emotion Marina sees her sons face for the first time.
61	"Alberto y Lucrecia inician una relación"	February 5, 2018
Lucrecia takes the bold decision to kiss Alberto and asking him to start a relationship. Dr. Zamudio finds out about this and threatens Alberto so that he does not play with his daughter's feelings.
62	"Edson le propone matrimonio a Vanessa"	February 6, 2018
To not waste more time Edson decides to give an engagement ring to Vanessa. Meanwhile Isauro drowns in alcohol knowing that Marina can already see.
63	"Ricardo le declara su amor a Marina"	February 7, 2018
Dr. Bazán stops hiding his feelings and confesses to Marina how important she has become in his life and how much he admires her as a woman.
64	"Marina rechaza a Ricardo y le cuenta su pasado"	February 8, 2018
The love that Ricardo feels is not returned by Marina. In order not to hurt him, she tells the truth about her relationship with Alberto and the son they together created.
65	"Marina se convierte en la asistente de Ricardo"	February 9, 2018
Thanks to Dr. Bazán, Marina gets her first job at the hospital. With this opportunity she will be able to continue learning to become a great nurse.
66	"Alberto y Ricardo se enfrentan"	February 12, 2018
Alberto dies of jealousy and decides to confront Dr. Bazán to demand the help he is giving Marina by giving her work in the hospital.
67	"Marina conoce el rostro de Alberto"	February 13, 2018
Marina claims Ricardo for having given her work in the same hospital where Dr. Ocaranza works. She makes the decision to resign so she will not have to see Alberto daily.
68	"Lucrecia conoce a Marina"	February 14, 2018
Lucrecia discovers that Marina works with Dr. Bazán and immediately approaches her with the curiosity to know her better.
69	"Marina cambia de look"	February 15, 2018
Thanks to Encarnación, Marina changes her image and looks more beautiful than ever. Ricardo finally dares to confess to Alberto that he is in love with Marina and plans to conquer her.
70	"Vanessa se casa con Edson"	February 16, 2018
Vanessa wants Paulino to stop her so as not to get married and escape together. Unfortunately he does not agree and she ends up being Edson's wife.
71	"Luis se interesa por su nieto"	February 19, 2018
Luis demands his right as a grandfather and asks Prudencia to bring Marina's son to live with them, since he carries the blood of an Ocaranza.
72	"Marina desconfía de las buenas intenciones de su padre"	February 20, 2018
Lack of confidence causes Marina to deny Luis the opportunity to meet and care for his grandson. Despite Prudencia's insistence, Marina does not want to put her family in danger.
73	"Luis consigue el perdón de Marina"	February 21, 2018
Don Luis approaches Marina to ask her for the opportunity to be close to his grandson. She accepts believing that his repentance is sincere and forgives him for all the wrong that he did to her.
74	"Paulino y Anita ya son novios"	February 22, 2018
Paulino decides to surprise Anita by preparing a birthday party, there he gets carried away by his feelings and asks her to start a relationship.
75	"Lucrecia acusa a Marina de ser una ladrona"	February 23, 2018
Lucrecia manages to make Dr. Muñoz distrust Marina's honesty by telling him that just the medicine that Toribio needed disappeared. Soon the whole hospital finds out about this supposed theft.
76	"Luis se queda con el hijo de Marina"	February 26, 2018
With the help of his lawyer, Luis sets a trap for Marina to sign the necessary documents in the civil registry and grant him the guardianship of her son.
77	"Marina le da una oportunidad a Ricardo"	February 27, 2018
Marina decides to take a risk and asks Ricardo to start getting to know each other better. With this opportunity Dr. Bazán tries to show her that his love can erase those heart wounds.
78	"Lucrecia le ofrece su ayuda a Isauro"	February 28, 2018
Lucrecia pretends and approaches Isauro to offer her help promising that she will do everything possible to recover Marina's love.
79	"Ricardo le pide a Luis Alberto que se aleje de Marina"	March 1, 2018
Ricardo is looking for a serious relationship with Marina and will not allow Luis Alberto to come between them, so he asks him to get away once and for all.
80	"Vanessa sufre violencia a lado de Edson"	March 2, 2018
Edson hits Vanessa and causes a severe crisis. Alberto attends her emergency and she asks for help to get out of the hell in which she lives.
81	"Toribio acusa a Luis de haberlo lastimado"	March 5, 2018
Toribio remembers the incident that some years ago left him badly in the head and reveals that it was Don Luis who shot him and never accepted responsibility.
82	"Vanessa y Edson sufren un aparatoso accidente"	March 6, 2018
Vanessa argues strongly with Edson after asking for a divorce, in a struggle both fall from the top of a balcony and suffer severe blows that put their lives at risk.
83	"Luis acepta su culpa ante Marina"	March 7, 2018
Determined to end his torment, Luis confesses the truth to Marina and accepts that he shot Toribio. She can not forgive him and reproaches him for never having a good heart.
84	"Isauro está dispuesto a cambiar su rostro"	March 8, 2018
Dr. Zamudio evaluates the case of Isauro and gives him the hope of being a normal man. He agrees to undergo reconstructive surgery on the condition of completely changing his face.
85	"Alberto sigue amando a Marina"	March 9, 2018
Alberto confesses to Vanessa that Marina has not left his mind and less from his heart. Despite having Lucrecia, he can not help thinking about his true love.
86	"Alberto y Marina reviven el pasado"	March 12, 2018
Alberto dares to approach Marina to invite her to dance. Being with her can not help telling her how much he needs her and how sorry he is for leaving her alone with his son.
87	"Ricardo enfurece contra Alberto"	March 13, 2018
Alberto kisses Marina and Ricardo goes out of control to face him. Under threats both begin to fight until Marina manages to prevent them from getting hurt.
88	"Marina y Ricardo ya son novios"	March 14, 2018
Lucrecia tricks Marina by making her believe that Alberto is a liar. Tired of false promises Marina decides to accept Ricardo's love.
89	"Alberto sufre por el noviazgo de Marina y Ricardo"	March 15, 2018
Alberto tries to repair the mistakes of the past and decides to look for an encounter with Marina at the Ocaranza house. There she confesses that she has already started a relationship with Ricardo Bazán.
90	"Marina teme que Isauro esté de regreso en su vida"	March 16, 2018
In the hospital it is rumored that there is a mysterious patient and Marina tries to find out who it is. Upon hearing that the patients face is disfigured by burns she is alarmed at the thought of Dr. Isauro.
91	"Isauro se rebela contra Lucrecia"	March 19, 2018
After discovering Lucrecia's lie, Isauro reveals himself by feeling manipulated by her. Dr. Zamudio tries to convince him so that his plan to operate remains standing and get rid of Marina.
92	"Alberto comienza a desconfiar de Lucrecia"	March 20, 2018
Alberto suspects that the mysterious patient is Isauro. When looking for him in the hospital he discovers that he escaped and questions Lucrecia to know the identity of the subject.
93	"Vanessa confiesa que Edson murió por su culpa"	March 21, 2018
Before being able to sign the papers of Edson's estate, Vanessa confesses to Hilda that she caused the death of her son. Susana finds out what Vanessa did and hits her uncontrollably.
94	"Isauro pone una demanda en contra de Marina"	March 22, 2018
Isauro acts legally against Marina and demands a paternity test. To make sure he will win, Isauro asks Lucrecia for help to falsify the results and manages to stay with Rafita.
95	"Marina teme que Isauro le pueda quitar a su hijo"	March 23, 2018
Marina was convinced that little Rafita is Alberto's son, but now she fears that Isauro has done everything possible to erase evidence that he is the father.
96	"Alberto acepta que Rafita es su hijo"	March 26, 2018
Rafita is going to live at the home of the Ocaranza and there Alberto dares to carry it. By having him close, his fatherly love emerges and happiness invades him.
97	"Isauro es el padre de Rafita"	March 27, 2018
With the help of Lucrecia, Isauro manages to get the DNA results in his favor and the judge confirms that Rafael is his son. Marina collapses emotionally when she has to share custody of Rafa.
98	"Yola y Erik ya son novios"	March 28, 2018
Yola learns that Erasmo set a trap for Erik to discredit him. Knowing the whole truth, Yola finally decides and kisses Erik showing him how much she likes him.
99	"Anita está embarazada"	March 29, 2018
Paulino makes love with Vanessa and can not hide his happiness, Anita finds out what happened and immediately takes care to avoid that Lino ends their relationship by confessing she is pregnant.
100	"Vanessa sacrifica su felicidad y renuncia a Paulino"	March 30, 2018
Vanessa decides to step aside when she finds out that Anita is pregnant, with all the pain in her heart she asks Paulino to face his responsibility and get married.
101	"Marina quiere casarse con Ricardo"	April 2, 2018
Marina proposes to Ricardo to form a family to give welfare and protection to Rafita. Upon hearing this statement, Ricardo jumps for joy and gladly accepts to marry.
102	"Luis se niega a perder a Prudencia"	April 3, 2018
Luis faces Fernando in the hospital and warns him that he will not leave the path free with Prudencia, since he will not sign any divorce papers.
103	"Lucrecia es descubierta por su padre"	April 4, 2018
Lucrecia talks to Isauro and makes a strong confession right in front of her father, upon hearing that she changed the DNA results Dr. Zamudio suffers a sudden pain in the chest.
104	"Alberto salva la vida de Isauro"	April 5, 2018
Dr. Zamudio collapses in full surgery and severely injures Isauro. Alberto supports him to save the patient's life, but when he realizes that it is his enemy, he hesitates to help him.
105	"Luis se entera que Zacarías le robó"	April 6, 2018
Zacarias dares to disappoint Luis's confidence and steals much of the gains of La Añoranza. Upon discovering him, Luis decides to look for him to make him pay.
106	"Isauro planea tener la custodia de Rafita"	April 9, 2018
Marina finds out that Rafita is registered with the surnames of Luis and Prudencia. With this news, she fears that the authorities will take away her son and give all rights to Isauro.
107	"Marina es acusada de falsificación"	April 10, 2018
Luis confesses that he modified Rafita's act and intends to solve the problem. The judge misinterprets this situation accusing Marina of falsifying official documents.
108	"Marina acepta vivir con Isauro"	April 11, 2018
The judge grants Dr. Sotero provisional custody of Rafita and Marina fears that her son is in danger. To avoid more problems, she decides to move to Isauro's house.
109	"La policía investiga la muerte de Ramona"	April 12, 2018
Isauro's health worsens upon learning that Ramona's body appeared. Lucrecia strongly suspects that Dr. Sotero committed the crime to protect himself and continue with his plan to stay with Marina.
110	"Lucrecia mata a Isauro y ataca a Marina"	April 13, 2018
Lucrecia seeks to put an end to Marina's life and uses Isauro to achieve her goal, although he also had to pay with his life.
111	"Lucrecia intenta asesinar a Marina"	April 15, 2018
112	"Ricardo y Marina juntos para siempre"	April 15, 2018
Lucrecia can not stand that Marina has survived the stabbings she gave her and she is afraid that she will tell the police and go to jail, so she decides to try to kill her again. Marina manages to be a surgeon and lives happily next to Rafita, her little son, but to everyone's surprise she decides to form a relationship with Ricardo.

== Rating ==
Season	Timeslot (CT)	Episodes	First aired		Last aired	
Season	Timeslot (CT)	Episodes	Date	Premiere Ratings	Date	Finale Ratings
1	Mon–Fri 4:30pm	112	November 13, 2017	20.43	April 15, 2018	22.03

== Awards and nominations ==
Year	Award	Category	Nominated	Result
2018	TVyNovelas Awards	Best Antagonist Actor	Eduardo Santamarina	Nominated
2018	TVyNovelas Awards	Best Co-lead Actress	Claudia Ramírez	Nominated
2018	TVyNovelas Awards	Best Co-lead Actor	Carlos de la Mota	Nominated
2018	TVyNovelas Awards	Best Supporting Actress	Cecilia Toussaint	Nominated
2018	TVyNovelas Awards	Best Supporting Actor	Sergio Reynoso	Nominated
2018	TVyNovelas Awards	Best Young Lead Actress	Scarlet Gruber	Nominated
2018	TVyNovelas Awards	Best Young Lead Actor	Emmanuel Orenday	Nominated
