= Esmeralda (Mexican TV series) =

- José Armando (Fernando Colunga, left) and Esmeralda (Leticia Calderón, right)
- Genre: Telenovela
- Based on: Esmeralda by Delia Fiallo
- Screenplay by: Georgina Tinoco; Dolores Ortega; Liz Orlin
- Directed by: Beatriz Sheridan; Marta Luna; Karina Duprez
- Starring: Leticia Calderon; Fernando Colunga; Enrique Lizalde; Laura Zapata; Salvador Pineda; Ignacio López Tarso
- Music by: José Antonio "Potro" Farías
- Opening theme: "Esmeralda" by Javier Rodríguez Rodríguez ("Esmeralda" by Chris Durán when airing in some regions, included Spain and Brazil)
- Country of origin: Mexico
- Original language: Spanish
- No. of episodes: 137 (144 original version)

Production
- Executive producer: Salvador Mejía
- Producers: Nathalie Lartilleux; Maricarmen Marcos
- Production locations: Mexico City, Mexico
- Editor: Juan Franco
- Camera setup: Multi-camera
- Production company: Televisa

Original release
- Network: Canal de las Estrellas
- Release: May 5 – November 14, 1997

Related
- Esmeralda (original series); Topacio; Esmeralda (Brazilian telenovela); Sin tu mirada

Esmeralda is a Mexican telenovela produced by Salvador Mejía for Televisa in 1997. Written by Delia Fiallo.

It stars Leticia Calderón, Fernando Colunga, Enrique Lizalde, Laura Zapata, Salvador Pineda and Ignacio López Tarso.

On Monday, May 5, 1997, Canal de las Estrellas started broadcasting Esmeralda weekdays at 8:00pm, replacing Mujer, casos de la vida real. The last episode was broadcast on Friday, November 14, 1997 with Desencuentro replacing it the following Monday.

It was the first collaboration between Fernando Colunga and Juan Pablo Gamboa, who would both later work in La usurpadora (1998), which is also a production of Mejia.

In the United States, it was first broadcast on Univision from December 15, 1997 to July 9, 1998.

In 1998 it was named Best Telenovela of the Year by the TVyNovelas Awards.

== Plot ==
Rodolfo Peñarreal (Enrique Lizalde) is obsessed with having a son. After several miscarriages, his wife, Blanca (Raquel Morell), becomes pregnant again. One night, a baby girl is born, but it is believed she was stillborn.

In the same town, but in a more humble home, a baby boy is born, but his mother dies during childbirth. The midwife and Crisanta (Dina de Marco), Blanca's nanny, with the best intentions and hoping to appease Rodolfo, decide to switch the babies.

While Blanca is unconscious, Crisanta gives the midwife a pair of emerald earrings, forcing her to forget what happened that night. Once the exchange has been made, the midwife, Dominga (Raquel Olmedo), realizes that the baby girl is not dead, but it is now too late to correct the mistake.

Thus, the boy born in a miserable shack sees his first light in the opulence of a grand house, while the beautiful girl, born with a silver spoon in her mouth, takes her first steps amidst dilapidated walls and misery.

Esmeralda (Leticia Calderón), the Peñarreal baby girl, was born blind, but the kindness of her heart grants her the light to be happy and the hope that one day she will find love. Her eyes are "the eyes of love".

Time passes, and the destinies of both children, Esmeralda and José Armando (Fernando Colunga), intertwine when they fall in love at first sight. However, obsession, desire, family interests, a woman's false love, and the Peñarreal family's pride in upholding their lineage destroy every noble feeling.

Esmeralda and José Armando will be the victims of resentment, which gradually submerges them in the darkness of heartbreak.

== Cast ==
=== Main cast ===
- Leticia Calderón as Esmeralda
- Fernando Colunga as José Armando
- Enrique Lizalde as Rodolfo
- Laura Zapata as Fátima
- Salvador Pineda as Lucio
- Ignacio López Tarso as Melesio

=== Supporting cast ===
- Gustavo Rojo as Bernardo
- Irán Eory as Sister Piedad
- Noé Murayama as Fermín
- Elsa Cárdenas as Hortensia
- Raúl Padilla "Chóforo" as Troleibús
- Nicky Mondellini as Dr. Muñoz
- Dina de Marco as Crisanta
- Elsa Navarrete as Aurora
- Esther Rinaldi as Florecita
- Rosita Pelayo as Hilda
- Juan Carlos Serrán / Rafael Amador as Dionisio
- Juan Pablo Gamboa as Álvaro
- María Luisa Alcalá as Socorro
- Alejandro Ruiz as Adrián
- Nora Salinas as Graciela
- Rafael del Villar as Sebastián
- Sergio Jurado as Estrada
- Raquel Morell as Blanca
- Raquel Pankowsky as Juana
- Raquel Olmedo as Dominga
- Ana Patricia Rojo as Georgfina

=== Guest star ===
- Horacio Vera as Ciriaco

== International broadcast ==
- Argentina: Telefe
- Australia: Seven Network (2000)
- Bosnia and Herzegovina: Mreža Plus
- Brazil: SBT (2000; 2025 re-run)
- Bulgaria: Nova (1999), 7 dni (2002 re-run)
- Chile: Mega, La Red (re-run)
- Colombia: Canal 1
- Croatia: HRT 1 (1998), Doma TV (re-run)
- Dominican Republic: Telemicro
- Ecuador: Gamavisión
- Equatorial Guinea: TVGE (2009)
- Ghana: TV3 (2000)
- Greece: Star Channel (1999)
- Hungary: RTL (1998), Story TV (re-run), Izaura TV (2 reruns: 2025, 2026)
- India: StarPlus
- Indonesia: SCTV (1998; 3 re-runs: 1999, 2001, 2004); Vision 2 Drama (2006); MDTV (2026 re-run); one unofficial television series adaptation (Diva, RCTI, 2008)
- Israel: Viva
- Italy: Lady Channel, Rete 4 (re-run), Telenorba (re-run)
- Lebanon: LBCI (1999; 2007 re-run)
- Macedonia: MRT
- Malaysia: TV3 (1998), Astro Bella (2012 re-run)
- Montenegro: Pink M
- Morocco: 2M (2002)
- Paraguay; SNT (1998), Telefuturo (2006 re-run)
- Peru: América Televisión
- Philippines: RPN 9 (1998)
- Poland: TVN (1998; 2000 re-run), TV4 (2017 re-run)
- Portugal: RTP1 (1998)
- Romania: Pro TV (2000), Acasă (2024 re-run)
- Russia: ORT (1999)
- Serbia: RTV Pink, Una TV (2026 re-run)
- Slovakia: TV Markíza (1999), JOJ Plus (re-run), TV Doma (re-run)
- Slovenia: Pop TV
- Spain: La 1 (2000), Hogar 10 (2007 re-run)
- South Korea: KBS1 (1998)
- Sri Lanka: Sirasa TV
- Turkey: ATV (1998)
- United Kingdom: Channel 4 (1999)
- United States: Univision (1997)
- Uzbekistan: Yoshlar (2002)
- Venezuela: Venevisión

== Awards ==
Year	Award	Category	Nominee(s)	Result
1998	TVyNovelas Awards	Best Telenovela	Salvador Mejía	Won
1998	TVyNovelas Awards	Best Revelation	Alejandro Ruiz	Won
1998	TVyNovelas Awards	Best Direction	Beatriz Sheridan; Marta Luna; Karina Duprez	Won
1998	TVyNovelas Awards	Best Direction of the Cameras	Jesús Nájera	Won
1999	Latin ACE Awards	International Male Figure of the Year	Fernando Colunga	Won
