= Ivonne Attas =

Venezuelan journalist, actress and politician

- Born: August 2, 1943 (age 82); Damascus, French Syria
- Occupations: telenovela soap opera actress; politician (Copei party)
- Known for: 3rd Mayor of the Baruta Municipality (3 December 1995 - 30 July 2000); Councilor of the Chacao Municipality (1992–1995)

Ivonne Attas (born August 2, 1943) is a Syrian-born Venezuelan telenovela soap opera actress and politician of the Copei party. Attas served as the third mayor of the Baruta Municipality (3 December 1995 - 30 July 2000). She has mostly portrayed villains during her acting career. In addition, she has worked as a columnist and interviewer for various Venezuelan media outlets.

== Early life and education ==
Ivonne Attas was born into a family of Jewish merchants from Thessaloniki who moved to the city of Damascus, Syria. Her parents are Darío Attas Nissim and Pauline (Palomba) Calderón de Attas. Her family moved to Venezuela when she was a child. She completed studies in Social Communication at the Andrés Bello Catholic University, as well as dramatic art studies at the Juana Sujo School of Dramatic Art.

== Career ==
Her career as an actress was defined by villain roles that she has played in most of the soap operas in which she has acted, even generating hatred among offscreen viewers.

She has also been a columnist and interviewer for various Venezuelan media outlets, such as the Venezuelan portals Gentiuno, Opinión y Noticias, and the now extinct Atel TV.

Attas began her political career as Councilor of the then Sucre Municipality, Miranda in 1979, serving between 1982 and 1984 as Vice Minister of Information and Tourism in the government of Luis Herrera Campins. In 1984, she was again elected Councilor of the Sucre District. On January 4, 1993, Irene Sáez was sworn in as the first Mayor of the newly created Chacao Municipality, with Attas being one of the members of the Municipal Council. She was elected Mayor of the Baruta Municipality between 1995 and 2000, representing the Social Christian Party (Copei). Her term was extended when the municipal elections initially scheduled for 1998 were postponed two times at the national level. In 2011, she refrained from running for mayor of the Sucre Municipality.

== Personal life ==
She was married to the journalist Valeriano Humpierres, who became general director of Venevisión and with whom she had one son, the Venezuelan singer-songwriter, writer and motivator, Jonathan Darío Humpierres, better known as "Juan Diego".

== Telenovelas ==
- Lucecita (1967) - Angelina (main villain)
- Soledad (1969) - Lolita (main villain)
- Esmeralda (1970) - Silvia Zamora (villain)
- María Teresa (1972) - Reina de López Bello (villain)
- Lucecita (1972) - Angelina (main villain)
- Una muchacha llamada Milagros (1973) - Irene y Giovanna D'Orsini (main villain)
- Mariana de la noche (1975) - Marcia Montenegro de Lugo Navarro (main villain)
- Mi hermana gemela (1975) - Ariana Herrera Salazar de Anselmi
- La Zulianita (1976) - Rosa Francia
- Cumbres borrascosas (1976)
- Laura y Virginia (1977) - Michelle (villain)
- Tres mujeres (1978) - Blanca
