= Azucena (TV series) =

Venezuelan telenovela

- Genre: Telenovela
- Created by: María Antonieta Gómez; Édgar Mejía
- Directed by: Tito Rojas
- Starring: Grecia Colmenares; Javier Vidal
- Opening theme: Mía by Carlos Mata
- Ending theme: Sólo faltas tú by Ilan Chester
- Country of origin: Venezuela
- Original language: Spanish
- No. of episodes: 32

Production
- Production location: Caracas
- Production company: RCTV

Original release
- Network: RCTV
- Release: October 1 – November 6, 1984

Azucena is a Venezuelan telenovela written by María Antonieta Gómez and Édgar Mejías and produced by Radio Caracas Televisión in 1984. The series lasted only 32 episodes, and was distributed internationally by RCTV International.

Grecia Colmenares and Javier Vidal starred as the main protagonists.

== Synopsis ==
Azucena is a humble young woman from the poor side of town who sees her wedding plans to Rodolfo, a rich young man, crumble. His family does not accept this marriage due to the difference in social background. A family debt makes Rodolfo marry Brenda Mirabal and Azucena decides to marry an old boyfriend in spite of the fact that she is expecting Rodolfo’s baby, who is not aware of the truth. Through terrible conflicts this couple continue to fight for their love until, in spite of doubts, pain and betrayal, it triumphs.

== Cast ==
- Grecia Colmenares as Azucena Rodríguez
- Javier Vidal as Rodolfo Itriago
- Romelia Agüero as Renata San Lucas
- Gladys Caceres as Trinita
- Arturo Calderón as Germán Rosas
- Nohely Arteaga as Ornella
- Carlos Camara Jr. as Julio
- Yanis Chimaras as Rafael
- Julie Restifo as Brenda
- Carlos Márquez as Iván Rómulo
