= Carlos de la Mota =

Dominican architect, actor and singer (born 1975)

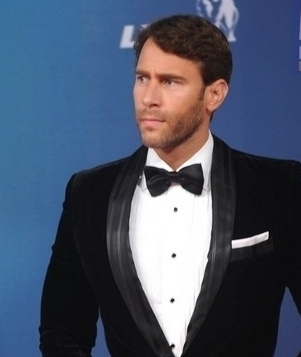
- Born: October 19, 1975 (age 50); La Vega, Dominican Republic
- Occupations: Actor, singer, architect
- Years active: 2003–present

Carlos de la Mota (born October 19, 1975) is a Dominican architect, actor and singer. His acting career began in 2003 and he received critical acclaim for his role in the telenovela Destilando Amor, as Britishman James O'Brian.

== Biography ==
=== Early years ===
Carlos de la Mota was born in La Vega, in the north of the Dominican Republic to a criollo family. During the early years of his life, he lived in New York City, United States and later in the city of Santo Domingo.

=== Career ===
At 23, de la Mota graduated with a degree in architecture from the Pontificia Universidad Catolica Madre y Maestra and found work immediately after graduating working in a government institution. After working for the Dominican government as an architect, he moved to Mexico where he decided to start an acting career while still practicing architecture.

== Filmography ==
=== Film ===
Year	Title	Role	Notes
2006	Tired of Kissing Frogs	Miguel	Debut film

=== Television ===
Year	Title	Role	Notes
2003–2004	Mariana de la Noche	Damián	
2003–2007	Mujer, Casos de la Vida Real	Various roles	
2004	Amar otra vez	Sergio Santillán Millán	
2005	Piel de otoño	Diego	
2005	La Madrastra	Botones	
2005–2006	Corazón Partido	Germán Garza	
2006	La fea más bella	Eduardo Mendoza	
2007	Destilando Amor	James O'Brien	
2008	Las tontas no van al cielo	Raúl de la Parra	
2008–2009	Mañana es para siempre	Santiago Elizalde	
2010–2011	Cuando me enamoro	Carlos Estrada	
2012	Por ella soy Eva	Santiago Escudero	
2013	Wild at Heart	Emir Karim	
2013–2014	Lo que la vida me robó	Refugio Solares	
2015	Hasta el fin del mundo	Esteban Arauz	
2016–2017	Tres veces Ana	Valentín Padilla Lazcano	
2017–2018	Sin tu mirada	Isauro Sotero Coronel	
2019–2020	Médicos, línea de vida	Dr. Luis Galván	
2021–2022	Mi fortuna es amarte	Mario Rivas Acosta	

=== Music video ===
Year	Song	Artist (s)
2012	"La malquerida"	Mariana Seoane
2014	"Lo que siento por ti"	Himself

== Awards ==
Awards and nominations
Year	Award	Category	Nominated	Result
2006	Premios Califa de Oro (Mexico)	Best Revelation of the Year	Cabaret	Won
2007	Premios FAMA (Latinoamérica)	Best Interpretive Characterization (Special Honorable Mention)	Destilando amor	Won
2008	Premios Gráfica de Oro (Mexico)	Best Revelation of the Year	Destilando amor	Won
2008	Palmas de Oro (Latinoamérica)	Best Revelation of the Year	Destilando amor	Won
2008	Premios Latino Legacy Awards (United States)	Best Revelation of the Year	Destilando amor	Won
2010	Premios Palmas de Oro (Latinoamérica)	Best Main Character Youthful of the Year	Mañana es para siempre	Nominated
2011	Premios Califa de Oro (Mexico)	Best Young Actor	Cash	Won
2011	Premios Sol de Oro (Mexico)	Best Play	Cash	Won
2012	Premios Micrófono de Oro (Mexico)	Best Play	Cash	Won
2012	Premios Fashion Week (Dominican Republic)	Recognition to the Trajectory in Dominican Republic	—	Won
2012	Premios People en Español (United States)	Best Supporting Actor	Por Ella Soy Eva	Won
2013	Premios TwitAwards (Dominican Republic)	Best Twitterer Dominican Abroad	—	Nominated
2013	Premios TVyEntretenimiento (Latinoamérica)	Best Masculine Revelation	Corazón Indomable	Won

=== Other artistic awards ===
Years	Recognition	Country
2010	Recorded his footprints on the "Plaza de las Estrellas" in Mexico City in October	Mexico
2012	It received a condedoración like "Visitor Distinguished" in the City of Santiago de los Caballeros	Dominican Republic

=== Personal artistic achievements ===
- First Dominican: to star in the musical Cabaret and do so for two consecutive years in Mexico.
- First Dominican: to receive an "Honorary Distinction" by characterization interpretative.
- First Dominican: to act in more than 10 Televisa telenovelas.
- First Dominican: to stamp their mark on the "Gallery of the Plaza of the Stars" in Mexico.
- First Dominican: to assemble and produce a play in Mexico.
- First Dominican: to win acting People in Spanish Award.
- First Dominican: in cocarrying out first webnovela that transmitted Televisa and Univision by Internet.
- First Dominican: to make a tour around Mexico with a play.
