= Cláudio Lins =

Brazilian actor

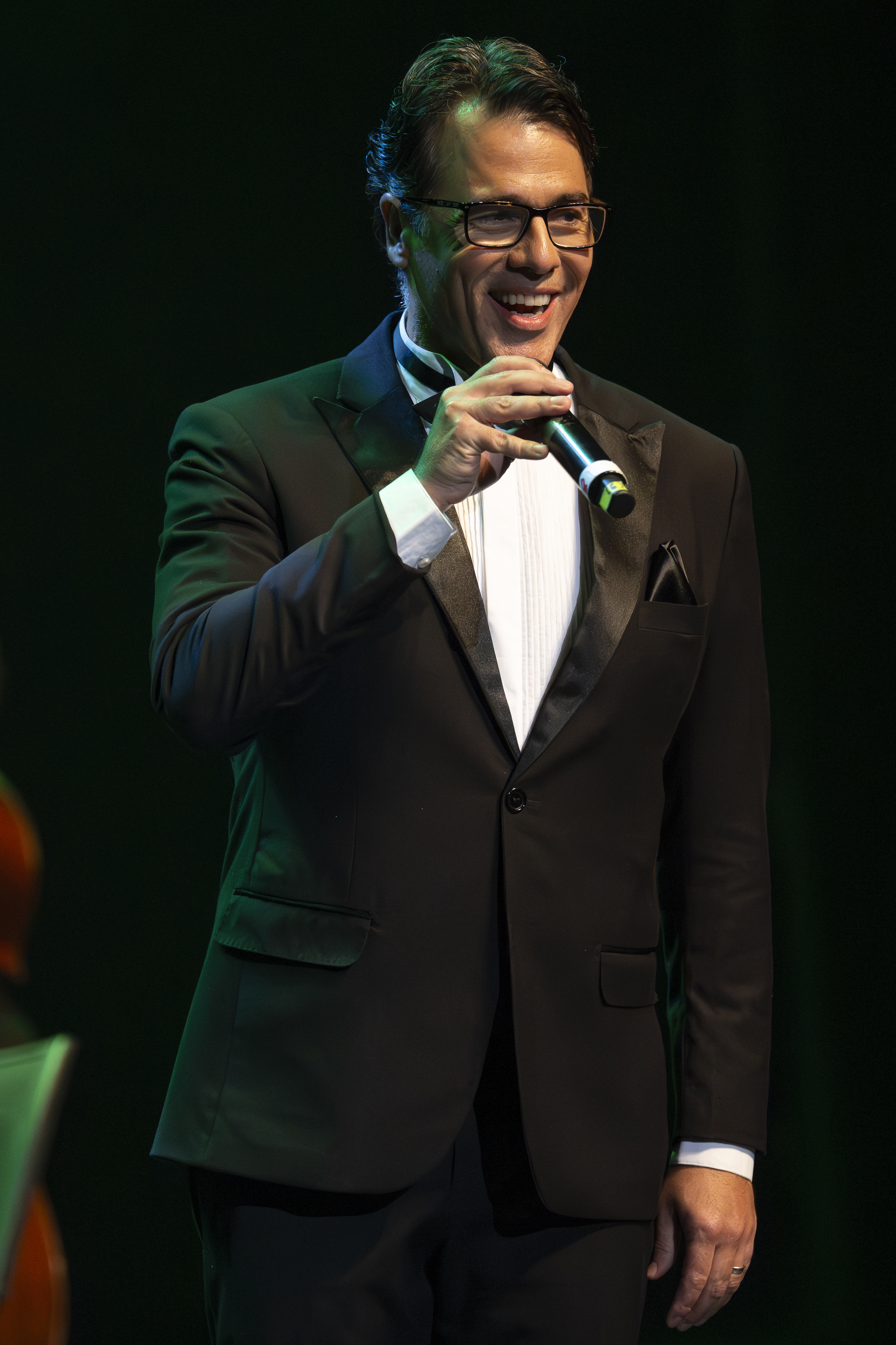
- Lins in 2025
- Born: Cláudio Werner Vianna Lins; 30 November 1972 (age 53); Rio de Janeiro, Brazil
- Occupations: Actor, singer, presenter
- Years active: 1984–present
- Spouse(s): Adriana Garambone (1997–2000); Alexandra di Calafiori (2005–present)
- Children: 1
- Parent(s): Lucinha Lins (mother); Ivan Lins (father)

Cláudio Werner Vianna Lins (born 30 November 1972) is a Brazilian actor, singer, and presenter. He is known for his extensive work in musicals, such as Ópera do Malandro, Nada Será Como Antes, Rock in Rio - O Musical, Elis, A Musical, O Beijo no Asfalto and Garota de Ipanema: O Amor é Bossa.

== Biography ==
Lins was born on 30 November 1972 in Rio de Janeiro. The son of singer and actress Lucinha Lins and singer and composer Ivan Lins, Cláudio grew up in a family of artists and from a young age showed talent in music: as a child, he took piano classes and participated in children's choirs. He took stage for the first time in 1984, at 11 years old, during the children's play “Sapatinho de Cristal”, directed by Cláudio Tovar. In 1985, he starred in another musical, “Verde que te quero ver”. Until he was 18 years old, he studied piano and musical theory, and started many bands in his adolescence, the most important being Pacatatucotianão). He would return to theatre, becoming a member of the traditional O Tablado, in Rio de Janeiro, where he studied for two years, participating in group practices.

== Career ==
In theatre, Lins worked with directors such as Bernardo Jablonski (A Visita da Velha Senhora, 1993; O Inimigo, 1994), Tônio Carvalho (A Tragédia Florentina, 1995), Aderbal Freire Filho (Tia Zulmira e nós, 2001), Marcelo Saback (Frisson, also 2001), Cláudio Tovar (Aldir Blanc, um Cara Bacana, 2000), Antônio Pedro (Se correr o Bicho pega, se ficar o Bicho come, 2002), Diogo Vilela (Elis Regina, Estrela do Brasil, also 2002), Charles Müller and Cláudio Botelho (Ópera do Malandro, 2003/04), among others. With television productions, he participated in telenovelas and miniseries such História de Amor (Rede Globo, 1995), Perdidos de Amor (Rede Bandeirantes, 1996), Terra Mãe (RTP – Portugal, 1997), Chiquinha Gonzaga (Rede Globo, 1999) and Sabor da Paixão (Rede Globo, 2002/03).

In 1999, Lins launched his first solo CD, Um, to positive reviews. In terms of musicals, he still made soundtracks for theatrical pieces and his compositions have been recorded by singers such as Lucinha Lins, Maria Rita, and Luciana Melo. In 2004, he returned to the musical scene with the show Eu Não Estou Aqui. For more than a year, from 2002 to 2003, the actor also took part in the musical A vida é um show (TVE – Rede Brasil) to rave reviews. In 2004, he would have great success as the protagonist in the SBT telenovela Esmeralda, playing José Armando in a romantic duo with Bianca Castanho. In 2009, Lins launched his second CD, Cara, with all songs either authored by him or in collaboration with other artists.

In 2010, he portrayed Claude Antoine Geraldy in Uma Rosa com Amor (2010), at SBT, and in 2011, again with SBT, starred in another novela by Tiago Santiago, titled Amor e Revolução, portraying the soldier José Guerra, who is divided during the Brazilian military dictatorship between his career as a major and a Communist lover. In 2015, he was hired by Rede Globo to participate in the novelaBabilônia, interpreting Sérgio, a businessman who falls in love with Ivan (Marcello Melo Jr.), his romantic interest in the novel.

== Personal life ==
In 1997, Lins began to date actress Adriana Garambone. They married in 1997, but separated in 2000. In 2002, he began a new relationship with businesswoman Alexandra di Calafiori, marrying her in 2005. In 2012, their child Mariano Lins was born.

== Theatre ==
Year	Title	Role
1984	Sapatinho de Cristal	Príncipe
1985–86	Verde que te Quero Ver	Menino Azul
1990–91	A Turma e o Tempo	Various roles
1992	A Filha do Sol	Guerreiro Vermelho
1992	A Visita	Alfredo
1993	O Inimigo	Roberto
1993	A Terra Vista da Lua	Neil
1993–94	Sleeping Beauty	Príncipe
1994	Terror na Praia	Luca
1995	Uma Tragédia Florentina	Guido Bardi
1995–96	Maria Minhoca	Chiquinho Colibri
1997	Hilda Furacão: O Musical	Frei Malthus
1998–00	Aldir Blanc, um Cara Bacana	Aldir Blan
2001	Frisson, Musical	Caco
2001	Tia Zulmira e Nós	Stanislaw Ponte-Preta
2002	Se Correr o Bicho Pega, Se Ficar o Bicho Come	Roque
2002–03	Elis Regina, Estrela do Brasil	César Camargo Mariano
2003–04	Ópera do Malandro	Barabbas
2004–05	A Mão e a Luva	Luís Alves
2006–07	Ópera do Malandro	Max
2007–08	O Baile	Galã Latino
2008	Quatro Carreirinhas	Seven Iron
2008–09	Gota d'Água	Creonte
2012–13	Nada Será Como Antes	Nilo
2013	Rock in Rio - O Musical	Orlando Tepedino
2014–16	Elis, A Musical	Cesar Camargo Mariano
2015–16	O Beijo no Asfalto	Arandir
2016–18	Garota de Ipanema – O Amor é Bossa	Steve

== Filmography ==
=== Television ===
Year	Title	Role	Note
1994	Você Decide	Anselmo	Episode: "Sombras do Passado"
1994	Você Decide	Rômulo Mourão	Episode: "Tudo Pela Arte"
1995	História de Amor	Bruno Moretti	
1996	Perdidos de Amor	Rodrigo	
1997	Terra Mãe	Filipe Romão	
1998	Você Decide	Alexandre	Episode: "Garoto de Programa"
1999	Você Decide	Pierre	Episode: "Numa e Ninfa"
1999	Chiquinha Gonzaga	João Carlos Neves Gonzaga (Juca)	
1999	Mulher	Beto	Episode: "O Acidente"
1999	Tiro e Queda	Renato Amarante	
2000	Malhação	Antônio	Episode: "10 de maio"
2000	Você Decide	Max	Episode: "Olha o Passarinho"
2001	As Filhas da Mãe	Fausto Cavalcante (young)	Episode: "27 de agosto"
2001–04	A Vida é um Show	Presenter	
2002	Sabor da Paixão	Luís Felipe Gonçalves	
2004	Esmeralda	José Armando Álvarez Real	
2006	Avassaladoras: A Série	Raul	Episode: "Insegurança"
2010	Uma Rosa com Amor	Claude Antòine Geraldy	
2011	Natália	Otávio	
2011	Tempo Final	Marcelo	Episode: "A Possuída"
2011	Amor e Revolução	Major José Mariano Guerra	
2013	Agora Sim!	Paulo	Episode: "Jura-Gandhi"
2014	A Segunda Vez	Eduardo	
2015	Questão de Família	Felipe	Season 2
2015	Babilônia	Sérgio da Mata	
2017	Popstar	Participante	Season 1
2019	Malhação: Vidas Brasileiras	Osvaldo Rabelo	Episode: "5 de fevereiro–14 de abril"
2023	Terra e Paixão	Juiz Guilherme Trindade	Episode: "27 de julho"

=== Film ===
Year	Title	Role
2011	Soulbound	Carlos
2015	Punhal	Felipe
2022	Aos Nossos Filhos	Sérgio

== Discography ==
Year	Album	Label	Ref
1999	Um	Velas	
2009	Cara	Biscoito Fino	

== Awards and nominations ==
Year	Award	Category	Work	Result	Ref
2011	10º Grande Prêmio do Cinema Brasileiro	Best Original Soundtrack	Dzi Croquettes	Nominated	
2015	4º Prêmio Botequim Cultural de Teatro	Best Actor	O Beijo no Asfalto – O Musical.	Won	
2015	28º Prêmio Shell de Teatro - RJ	Initiative to create adaptation of O Beijo no Asfalto	O Beijo no Asfalto – O Musical.	Won	
2016	10º Prêmio APTR de Teatro	Adaptation of O Beijo no Asfalto	O Beijo no Asfalto – O Musical.	Won	
2016	12ª Prêmio FITA	Best Soundtrack	O Beijo no Asfalto – O Musical.	Nominated	
2016	III Prêmio Cesgranrio de Teatro	Special Category for Adaptation of O Beijo no Asfalto	O Beijo no Asfalto – O Musical.	Won	
2022	Prêmio Destaques Musical.Rio	Best actor	Copacabana Palace: O Musical	Nominated	
