= Julia (1979 TV series) =

- Genre: Telenovela
- Created by: Original Story: Tessie Picasso; Adaptation: Carlos Olmos
- Directed by: Julio Castillo
- Starring: Lupita Ferrer; Pedro Armendáriz Jr.
- Country of origin: Mexico
- Original language: Spanish
- No. of episodes: 18

Production
- Executive producer: Irene Sabido
- Cinematography: Pino Castellanos

Original release
- Network: Canal de las Estrellas
- Release: 1979

Julia is a Mexican telenovela produced by Irene Sabido for Televisa in 1979.

== Cast ==
- Lupita Ferrer as Julia
- Pedro Armendáriz Jr.
- Víctor Junco
- Miguel Manzano
- María Eugenia Ríos
- Javier Ruán
- Oscar Servin
- Marta Aura
- Jorge Lavat
- Rosario Granados
