= Mi mejor amiga =

- Genre: Telenovela
- Created by: Delia Fiallo
- Written by: Delia Fiallo; Ana Mercedes Escámez
- Directed by: Grazio D'Angelo
- Starring: Flor Núñez; Félix Loreto; Elba Escobar
- Opening theme: "No me culpes a mi" by Oscar de Fontana
- Country of origin: Venezuela
- Original language: Spanish
- No. of episodes: 74

Production
- Executive producer: Tabaré Pérez
- Running time: 60 minutes

Original release
- Network: Venevision
- Release: 1980 – 1981

Mi mejor amiga is a Venezuelan telenovela written by Delia Fiallo and transmitted on Venevision in 1980.

Flor Núñez and Félix Loreto starred as the main protagonists with Elba Escobar as the main antagonist.

== Plot ==
Graciela Acosta goes to see a gynecologist to see if she can still have children after having an abortion five years before, and her doctor advises her she can as long as she undergoes a series of long and painful treatments. Graciela is married to Willi, a conformist who works at her father's company. He is satisfied with his current life, and his personality clashes with that of Graciela who is hardworking and wants to move up in life. This creates problems in their marriage. On the other hand, Milena breaks up with her boyfriend and decides to move in with her best friend Graciela. However, Milena begins to be a replacement for Graciela because she appears to be the perfect housewife. She cooks, cleans and provides company to a lonely Willi and they begin to fall in love. Graciela later discovers that her best friend and her husband have become lovers, thus creating a love triangle.

== Cast ==
- Flor Núñez as Graciela Pérez Acosta
- Félix Loreto as Willi Acosta
- Elba Escobar as Milena Ricardo
- Eva Blanco as Martha
- Raúl Xiquez
- Manuel Escolano
- Juan Frankis
- Betty Ruth as Carolina
- Fernando Flores
- Omar Omaña
- Elisa Escámez
- Guillermo Dávila
- Estelin Betancort
- Luis Colmenares
- Egnis Santos
- Tony Rodríguez
- Francia Ortiz
