= Topacio =

1984 Venezuelan telenovela

- Genre: Telenovela; Drama; Romance
- Created by: Delia Fiallo
- Based on: Esmeralda
- Written by: Delia Fiallo; Ana Mercedes Escámez; Milagros del Valle; Benilde Ávila
- Directed by: Luis Alberto Lamata; Luis Manzo
- Starring: Grecia Colmenares; Víctor Cámara
- Theme music composer: Carlos Mata
- Opening theme: ¿Qué por qué te quiero?
- Country of origin: Venezuela
- Original language: Spanish
- No. of seasons: 1
- No. of episodes: 182

Production
- Executive producer: Arquímedes Rivero
- Producers: Jorge Gherardi; Omar Pin
- Running time: 41-44 minutes
- Production company: Coral Pictures

Original release
- Network: RCTV
- Release: November 10, 1984 – August 4, 1985

Related
- Rebeca; Cristal; Esmeralda (1970); Esmeralda (1997); Esmeralda (2004); Sin tu mirada (2017)

Topacio is a 1984 Venezuelan telenovela produced by RCTV based on the telenovela by Delia Fiallo Esmeralda produced by rival network Venevisión in 1970. It starred Grecia Colmenares and Víctor Cámara and with the antagonistic participations of Nohely Arteaga, Alberto Marín and Chony Fuentes.

== Synopsis ==
In 1965 Aurelio Sandoval (Carlos Márquez) a wealthy landowner who owns "Las Tapaditas" in Guárico, Venezuela awaits the birth of a healthy male child, but Blanca, his wife, gives him a daughter who at first seems to have been stillborn. Only he will not know it until twenty years later, since between the midwife Domitila and the nanny Eulalia they exchange the girl for the newborn son of a laborer who, being already an orphan of a father, ends up being the same as a mother right at birth.

Jorge Luis Sandoval (Víctor Cámara) is raised with all the comforts and luxuries in Caracas, Venezuela and is studying medicine. On the other hand, that girl who seemed dead at birth, was actually alive but completely blind, as her mother suffered from Measles during her pregnancy. The girl received the name Topacio for the topaz earrings that Domitila received as payment for her services as a midwife. Topacio Sandoval (Grecia Colmenares) lives in a humble ranch with Domitila and grew up in the mountains as an orphan without studies until, as a teenager, Dr. Martín Buitrago (Alberto Marín) took her under his protection and took her daily to his house to instruct her, with the purpose of converting her on his wife as an adult. Due to her blindness, Topacio ignores that Martín was disfigured when saving her from a fire on the ranch where she lived and has become obsessed with her.

The Sandoval family comes to town after 20 years and meets Topacio. Despite being engaged to his spoiled and possessive cousin Yolanda Sandoval (Jeannette Rodríguez) Jorge Luis falls in love with Topacio. On the other hand Yolanda, oblivious to everything, in turn falls in love with a peon named Evelio Mercedes Montero (Pedro Lander) but her mother Hilda, who is Aurelio's sister-in-law, forces her to continue with Jorge Luis because they are both broke and they only have the path of marry him to maintain her social status.

Finally Jorge Luis breaks his engagement with Yolanda to marry Topacio and make a life together in the capital. Aurelio realizes, tries to separate them, without success. Jorge Luis, who suspects that Topacio's blindness has a cure, takes her to Caracas, where she is examined by his ophthalmologist friend Dr. Daniel Andrade, who confirms his suspicions. Once back and in an absence of Aurelio, the lovers marry in secret. Once married and after a humble but wonderful wedding night, Jorge Luis takes her to the family mansion, leaving her alone while he is away for a few days. As soon as Aurelio returns and finds out, he is enraged and knowing the claims regarding Topacio from Dr. Buitrago, takes her by force to the latter's house, who keeps Topacio in a room against his will, taking place a discussion in the one that Martin finally reproaches Topacio that she belongs to him because he was disfigured when saving her and makes him touch the scar on his face, causing Topacio to faint. When Martín wakes up, he makes Topacio believe that they have had sex by force, although that was not true.

On the other hand, the nanny Eulalia had already recognized the Topaz earrings as the ones she used to pay for Domitila's services. Blanca then learns that Topacio is her real daughter. When Jorge Luis returns, he confronts his father to force him to confess where he has taken Topacio, but he refuses until Eulalia decides to confess the whole truth and both Jorge Luis and Aurelio find out what happened. At first Aurelio does not give credit to the information but confesses where he has taken the young woman. Immediately Jorge Luis rescues Topacio from the house of Dr. Buitrago but he threatens him and warns him that she will return of her own free will.

Jorge Luis spends a few days of uncertainty and confusion when he learns of his true origin. But for his part, Topacio is silent and does not tell what she thinks has happened in Martín's house, but when she discovers that she is pregnant, fearing that the child is Martín's, she decides to run away, but finally Jorge Luis finds her and tries to understand why of her flight. Finally she tells him that she is pregnant and what she thinks happened at Martín's house. Jorge Luis, faced with the possibility that Topacio's future baby is not his, puts his pride and jealousy before the love he felt for Topacio and makes her choose between his son or him. By choosing Topacio for her son Jorge Luis, he no longer wants anything with her, whom he abandons.

Topacio flees with Domitila and arrives in Caracas, where she finally gives birth to her son alone. They find refuge in the pension of Mr. Nicoménez's family. One day he decides to undergo eye surgery and goes to Dr. Daniel Andrade's ophthalmology clinic, to whom he proposes that he operate it in exchange for later rendering his services as an assistant or assistant. Daniel, who falls deeply in love with her, becomes her protector and operates her. Thanks to him Topacio recovers his sight and begins to work for him, without confessing that he has a son. At the same time, Daniel discovers him and, faced with this new situation, Topacio opens up to him and tells him everything about his past.

Meanwhile, the Sandoval family returned to Caracas a long time ago. Aurelio, full of remorse at all the evils he committed against Topacio, reconsiders and decides to protect her and recognize her as his daughter.

Without Topacio knowing it and to check if Topacio is still in love with Jorge Luis, Daniel fixes everything so that Topacio works in the same hospital as him, but Jorge Luis has also entered as a resident doctor. At first Topacio does not recognize him, since he never saw his face but soon recognizes him by his voice and rejects him.

During the time that Jorge Luis and Topacio had been separated this beginning, relationships with Valeria Rangel (Nohely Arteaga) a sculptor daughter of a prestigious plastic surgeon, specialty of Jorge Luis, who takes him in charge as a disciple. Valeria, who had been a confidant of Jorge Luis when she found out that they both work in the same hospital, fearing to lose Jorge Luis, tells Martín about Topacio's whereabouts, since it happened that his father and Martín were friends. Thus begins a terrible and obsessive persecution that will only bring suffering and pain to the young woman. It is Valeria herself who convinces her father to operate secretly from Jorge Luis to Martín. Martín is admitted to the same hospital and during that time before the operation, he takes official steps to claim Topacio's son, threatening to take the child from him as his father if she does not agree to marry him. Finally the operation takes place but during it Dr. Rangel dies and Jorge Luis, on duty that day is forced to finish the operation. The operation is in principle a complete success and Martín seems to end up without his scar, believing that it will be easier for him to conquer Topacio. However in a fit of rage when arguing with Topacio he gives him a heart attack. Again it is Jorge Luis who takes care of him and being alone with him, during the agony before his death, Martín confesses to Jorge Luis that that night that Topacio was held at his home nothing happened and that Topacio's son is his.

== Cast ==
- Grecia Colmenares as Topacio Sandoval
- Víctor Cámara as Jorge Luis Sandoval
- Lourdes Valera as Violeta Montero
- Nohely Arteaga as Valeria Rangel
- Henry Zakka as Dr. Daniel Andrade
- América Barrios as Doña Hortensia Vda. de Andrade
- Carlos Cámara Jr. as Cirilo
- Ileana Jacket as Carmen Julia
- Carlos Montilla as Rafaelote
- Rosario Prieto as Doña Pura
- Zoe Ducós as Sor Piedad
- Julio Capote as Dr. Peralta
- Gledys Ibarra as Pacient
- Carlos Márquez as Don Aurelio Sandoval
- Cecilia Villarreal as Doña Blanca de Sandoval
- Jeannette Rodríguez as Yolanda Sandoval
- Pedro Lander Evelio Mercedes Montero
- Chony Fuentes as Hilda Vda. de Sandoval
- Alberto Álvarez as Indio Caraballo
- Bárbara Mosquera as Ligia Salazar
- Alberto Marín as Dr. Martín Buitriago
- Dante Carlé as Dr. Francisco Rangel
- Freddy Escobar as Dr. Humberto Guzmán
- Carlos Villamizar as Don Concepción Montero
- Pablo Gil as Don Crisancho Vargas
- Miguel Alcántara as Dr. Víctor Pérez
- Pedro Espinoza as Lic. Joaquín Machado
- Humberto Tancredi as Dr. Salazar
- Osvaldo Paiwa as Dr. Fuentes
- Amalia Pérez Díaz as Domitila
- Carolina Cristancho as Judith
- Lino Ferrer as Alberto
- Carlos Fraga as Jairo
- Olga Rojas as Yumara
- Soraya Sanz as Coralina
- Sebastián Falco as Jairo
- William Cartaya as Félix
- Martha Pabón as Esther
- Reina Hinojosa as Nelly
- Dalila Colombo as Zoila
- Jenny Noguera as Cachita
- Mahuampi Acosta as Doña Eulalia
- Arturo Calderón as Uncle Fermín
- Zuleima González as Purita Josefina
- Juan Frankis as Don Nicomedes
- William Bracamonte as Dr. Estrada
- Lourdes Medrano as Doctor
- Kiko Fonseca as Priest
- Carlos Flores as Hotel receptionist
- Johnny Carvajal as Pediatrician
- Lucía Goncalves
