= Patrícia Salvador =

Brazilian businesswoman (born 1978)

- Born: February 22, 1978 (age 48); Campinas, São Paulo, Brazil
- Occupation: Businesswoman
- Spouse: Lásaro do Carmo Júnior (m. 2011)
- Children: 2

Patrícia Fernanda Salvador do Carmo, better known as Patrícia Salvador (born February 22, 1978), is a Brazilian businesswoman, former fashion model, actress, television presenter and stage assistant.

Salvador became known by presenting several programs with Silvio Santos during seventeen years on SBT. Fired from the station in 2015, despite the claim that her role no longer existed, she was rehired the following year to handle product placements during the newscast Primeiro Impacto.

== Biography ==
Salvador is graduated in Public Relations by the Pontifical Catholic University of Campinas and in Performing Arts by the Célia Helena School Theater.

Salvador started her career at the age of 13, as a model. On the television, she started in 1998, in the program Fantasia as a stage assistant and dancer, in which she stayed for few time. In 1999, Salvador started to work in the program Tentação (Temptation), and years later, she would as a stage assistant in the Tele Sena prize draw and in the program Roda a Roda. Salvador also worked in the programs Family Feud and Qual é a Música? (What is the Music?), and in 2006, she was the winner of the dance competition Bailando por um Sonho (Dancing for a Dream).

Subsequently, after a sudden onset of illness of the then presenter of the program Charme, Adriane Galisteu, Salvador came to replace Galisteu. After the episode, she did it in the following vacations of the official presenter.

Despite already acted in telenovelas, like Esmeralda, and the experience as a presenter, Salvador continued as the stage assistant of the program Roda a Roda until 2011, and occasionally she replaced Silvio as the presenter of the program on the vacation periods of the presenter.

After the launching of the cosmetic company Jequiti, of the Silvio Santos Group, Salvador passed to present the program Ganhe Mais Dinheiro com Jequiti (Earn More Money with Jequiti), at Sundays, having been the poster girls of the company during its first years.

=== As a businesswoman ===
Currently, Salvador has a store located on the Shopping Flamingo, in Barueri.

== Personal life ==
Since September 2011, Salvador is married to the businessman Lásaro do Carmo Júnior, with whom she has two children: João Paulo and Bárbara, born in 2012 and 2014, respectively.

== Works on the television ==
=== TV programs ===
Year	Title	Role
1998-99	Fantasia	Fantasia Girl
1999-02	Tentação (Temptation)	Stage assistant
2003-11	Sorteio da Tele Sena (Tele Sena Prize Draw)	Stage assistant
2003-11	Roda a Roda (Spin the Wheel)	Stage assistant
2005-06	Family Feud	
2005 / 2007-08	Qual é a Música? (What is the Music?)	
2006	Bailando por um Sonho (Dancing for a Dream)	Contestant / Winner
2007-08	Charme	
2009-11	Ganhe mais Dinheiro com Jequiti (Earn more Money with Jequiti)	
2012-15	Teleton	
2016	Primeiro Impacto	

=== Telenovelas ===
Year	Title	Character
2002	Marisol	Angélica
2004-05	Esmeralda	Pietra
2009	Vende-se um Véu de Noiva	Mônica
2017	Carinha de Anjo	Presenter of the Newscast
