= Tú eres mi destino (1969 TV series) =

- Genre: Telenovela
- Country of origin: Mexico
- Original language: Spanish

Original release
- Network: Telesistema Mexicano

Tú eres mi destino is a 1969 Mexican telenovela produced by Televisa and originally aired by Telesistema Mexicano.

== Cast ==
- Héctor Andremar
- Fina Basser
- Lupita Ferrer
- Ana Martín
