= Atrévete =

- Genre: Telenovela; Romance; Drama
- Created by: Delia Fiallo
- Written by: Alicia Barrios; Vivel Nouel; Alicia Cabrera
- Directed by: César Enríquez
- Starring: Caridad Canelón; Pedro Lander; Alberto Álvarez; Dilia Waikarán
- Theme music composer: Rafael Medina
- Opening theme: "Atrévete" by Caridad Canelón
- Country of origin: Venezuela
- Original language: Spanish
- No. of episodes: 225

Production
- Producer: Henry Márquez
- Production company: RCTV

Original release
- Network: RCTV
- Release: January 23 – October 11, 1986

Related
- La señorita Elena (1967); La señorita Elena (1975); Vivo Por Elena (1998)

Atrévete is a Venezuelan telenovela produced by Radio Caracas Television in 1986. It is based on the telenovela La señorita Elena written by Cuban writer Delia Fiallo.

Caridad Canelón and Pedro Lander starred as the protagonists.

== Cast ==
- Caridad Canelón as Mariela Román
- Pedro Lander as Armando Morales
- Dilia Waikarán as Carmela
- Nancy González as Charo
- Haydée Balza as Barbie
- Laura Brey as Diana
- Miguel Alcántara as Marco
- Néstor Maldonado as Robertico
- Elisa Stella as Doña Amanda
- Rosario Prieto as Daría Sepúlveda
- Alberto Álvarez
- Belén Marrero
- Nohely Arteaga
- Julio Capote
