= Grecia Colmenares =

Venezuelan actress

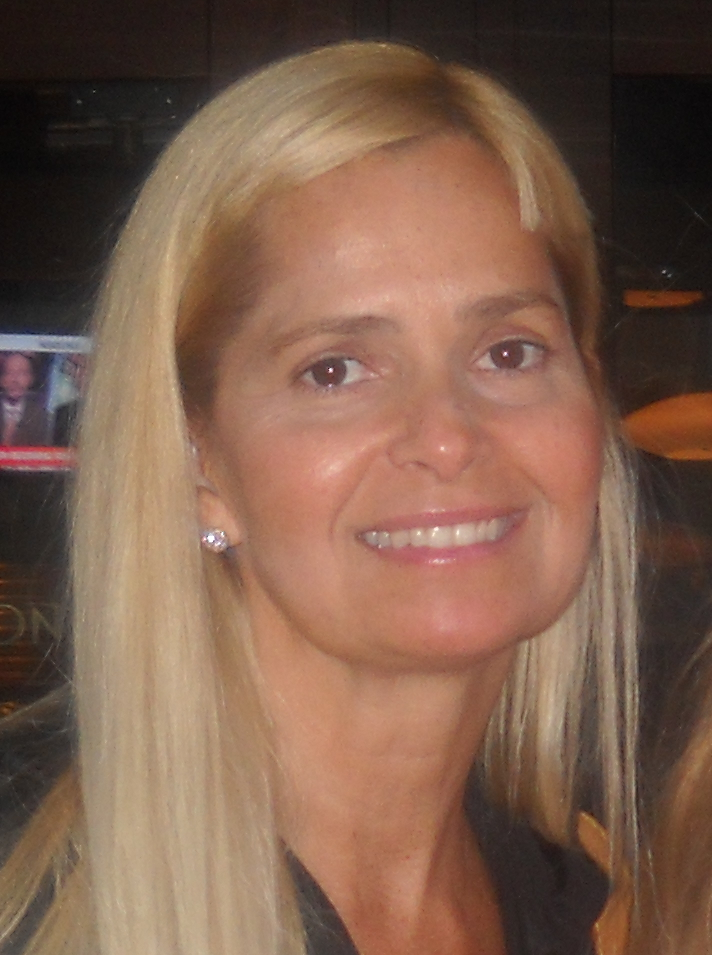
- Born: Grecia Dolores Colmenares Mieussens; 7 December 1962 (age 63); Valencia, Venezuela
- Citizenship: Venezuela (by birthplace), Argentina (naturalized)
- Occupation: Actress
- Years active: 1974-present
- Height: 1.70 m (5 ft 7 in)
- Spouses: Henry Zakka (m. 1979; div. 1983) Marcelo Pelegri (m. 1986; div. 2005)
- Children: Gianfranco Pelegri Colmenares (b. 1992)
- Parent(s): Lisandro Ernesto Colmenares and Grecia Mieussens

Grecia Dolores Colmenares Mieussens (Latin American Spanish: [ˈɡɾesja kolmeˈnaɾes]; born 7 December 1962) is a Venezuelan actress.

== Biography ==
Grecia Dolores Colmenares Mieussens was born on 7 December 1962, in Valencia, Venezuela. She is the daughter of a Venezuelan father and a French mother. She pursued her education at school Lisandro Ramírez and at the Liceo Malpica. She studied theater with the director and playwright Miguel Torrence.

== Personal life ==
In 1978, she met Henry Zakka on recordings of Drama de amor en el Bloque 6. In 1979, when Grecia was 17 years old, she married the actor, Henry Zakka. The couple divorced in 1983.

In 1986, a few months after arriving in Buenos Aires, Argentina, she met the Argentine businessman Marcelo Pelegri. In 1986, she married Marcelo Pelegri. On 4 September 1992, she gave birth to the couple's first child, a boy. The couple divorced in 2005.

Grecia Colmenares has obtained Argentine citizenship.

== Career ==
Grecia Colmenares became a sensation as a young actress in her native Venezuela during the 1970s, becoming a favorite of the general public in that country. She made her debut, as an eleven-year-old, in the Angelica Spanish soap opera. She continued participating in other soap operas through her teenage years, including the major hits Estefanía in 1979 and Elizabeth in 1980. Those major hits were followed by a number of lesser known soap operas, as well as other hits, such as 1981's Marielena and, in 1984, Azucena and Topacio. In 1991, she starred in the famous soap opera Manuela, which obtained a huge success worldwide, and Colmenares won several prizes for her outstanding job as Isabel and Manuela.

Although her jobs in Venezuela gave her considerable international fame, it was after she moved to Argentina that Colmenares became paparazzi fodder. Colmenares then became a household name across Latin America. She appeared frequently on the covers of gossip and fashion magazines, and rumors of a rivalry with Andrea Del Boca surfaced, although these rumors lasted for a short period only. In 1999, Colmenares acted in a telenovela that Del Boca had previously participated in: Chiquititas, which had by then become a major international hit. In 2001, she was seen in Miami, Florida, trying to get a contract with Univision. Nevertheless, she was not able to get contracted by that network. In Venezuela, Colmenares and Victor Camara formed a popular on-camera couple, starring together in a number of soap operas.

== Filmography ==
=== Television ===
Year	Title	Character	Channel
1974	Angélica	Angélica as a girl	RCTV
1976	Carolina	Blanquita Villacastín	RCTV
1977	Iliana		RCTV
1977	Zoraida		RCTV
1977	Tormento		RCTV
1979	Sangre azul	María de los Ángeles	RCTV
1979-1980	Estefanía	Ana María Escobar	RCTV
1980	Drama de amor en el bosque		RCTV
1980	Marielena	Raquel	RCTV
1981	Elizabeth	Lourdes	RCTV
1981	Rosalinda	Rosalinda	RCTV
1983	Chao Cristina	Diana Paiva Cáceres	RCTV
1983	Días de infamia	Minerva Reyes	RCTV
1984	Azucena	Azucena Rodríguez	RCTV
1984	El Paréntesis	Carmen Rosa	RCTV
1984-1985	Topacio	Topacio Sandoval	RCTV
1985-1986	María de nadie	María Domínguez	Telefe
1987	Grecia	Grecia	Canal 13
1988	Pasiones	Milagros Sarmiento	Canal 9
1989	Rebelde	Marina Roldán	Canal 9
1990	Romanzo	Gianina	TV Pública
1991	Manuela	Manuela Verezza/Isabel Guerrero	Canal 13
1993	Primer amor	María Inés	Canal 9
1994	Más allá del horizonte	María Bonangelo Olazábal/Milagros	Canal 9
1994	El día que me quieras	Soledad	Canal 13
1996	Amor sagrado	Eva Herrera/Ángeles Herrera	Telefe
1999	Chiquititas	Ana Pizarro	Telefe
2000	Vidas prestadas	Fernanda Valente López	Univisión

=== Theater ===
Year	Title	Character	Director	Theater
1976	Romeo & Julieta			
1999	Chiquititas	Ana Pizarro	Cris Morena	Teatro Gran Rex
2012	14 millones			Teatro del Sol and Teatro Broadway
2016	Cenicienta Mía			Teatro Municipal de Valencia and Teatro Ópera Maracay

=== Television Programs ===
Year	Program	Channel	Notes
2012	Bailando 2012	Canal 13	Eliminated-5th
2019	L'Isola dei Famosi 14	Canale 5	Eliminated-3rd
2023	Grande Fratello 17	Canale 5	Eliminated-14th
2026	Gran Hermano Argentina 13	Telefe	Eliminated-29th

== Awards and nominations ==
Year	Award	Category	Work	Result
1991	TP de Oro	Best Actress	Topacio	Nominated
2012	Premios Carlos Awards	Best Actress	14 millones	Nominated
