= Lupita Ferrer =

Venezuelan actress

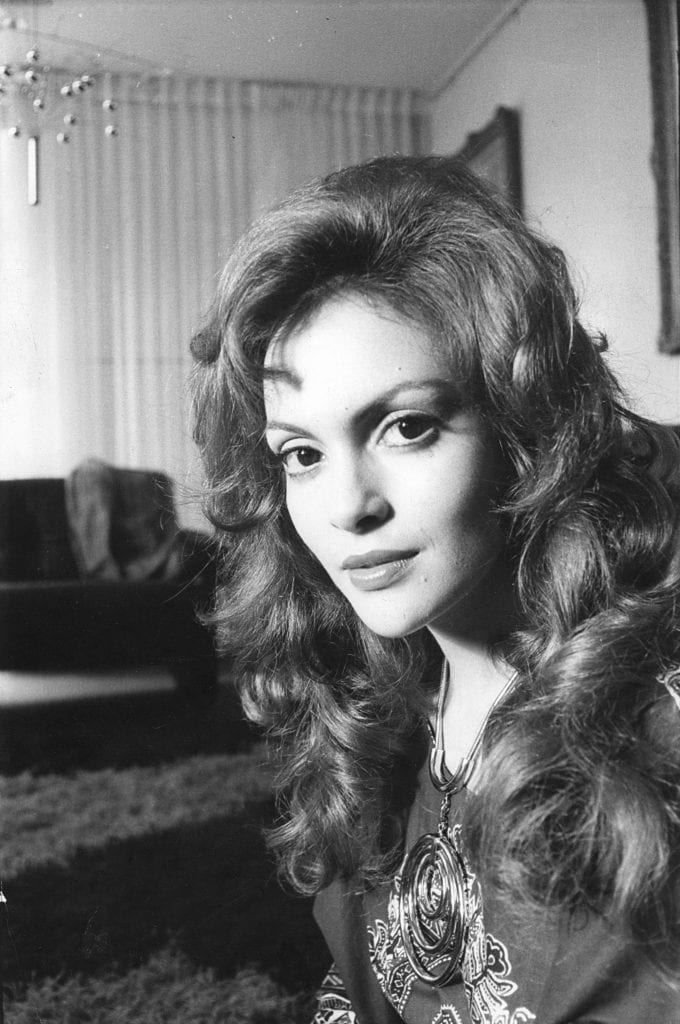
- Born: Yolanda Guadalupe Ferrer; December 6, 1947 (age 78); Maracaibo, Zulia, Venezuela
- Occupation: Actress
- Years active: 1965-present
- Spouse: Hall Bartlett (m. 1978; div. 1982)

Yolanda Guadalupe "Lupita" Ferrer (born December 6, 1947) is a Venezuelan theater, film and television actress. She is known as a "Queen of telenovelas" or "Queen of drama".

== Biography ==
Yolanda Guadalupe Ferrer in Maracaibo, Venezuela, to Spanish immigrant parents. She became known for her beauty (especially her large and expressive eyes) and her strong theatrical presence.

Ferrer has a theatrical background. She started at the age of 15 performing in Shakespeare's "Hamlet" as Ofelia. At the age of 18, then Venezuelan President Raul Leoni saw her performing in the piece "Dona Rosita La Soltera" ("Dona Rosita, the single one"), and was greatly impressed by her talent.

In the 1960s Ferrer worked in many Mexican and Venezuelan-Mexican film co-productions next to actors like Mario Moreno "Cantinflas", and during the 1970s worked in Hollywood movies sharing the screen with actors like Tony Curtis.

Her first telenovelas were Esmeralda, about a blind young woman, Mariana de la Noche (1975), about the forbidden love of Mariana Montenegro and Ignacio Lugo Navarro (José Bardina), María Teresa, a woman who goes insane after the loss of her little daughter, La Zulianita, Pecados Ajenos, and Cristal.

She lives in Miami.

She was married to the American film director Hall Bartlett for four years, who cast her alongside Anthony Quinn and the legendary Dolores del Río in his film The Children of Sanchez (1978), better known for its Grammy Award winning musical score by Chuck Mangione.

In 1985 she starred in a hugely successful telenovela produced in Venezuela by Radio Caracas Television named "Cristal" where she impersonates Victoria Ascanio, a very humble girl who after a brief forced encounter with a priest-to-be young man gets pregnant and is forced to leave her baby girl away after delivering her. Years after she comes back as the owner of a high couture clothes designing company which she rules with an iron fist. She hires a very beautiful girl who, after many plot devices applied, she discovers is her long lost daughter, whose estrangement make Victoria feel guilty and bittered. Cristal was a big success in South America, the U.S., Europe and Asia and was dubbed in many languages.

In 2006, Ferrer made a comeback in the American drama series Ugly Betty, in which she played an actress in a telenovela who gets into a fight with a nurse on the show played by (Ugly Betty series creator) Salma Hayek. In 2007, Ferrer participated in Telemundo's Pecados Ajenos, which has since become a cult classic, as the main villain, the evil Agata Mercenario. In 2010, Ferrer participated in Univision Studios - Eva Luna as Justa Valdéz. In 2012, Ferrer also acted a telenovela by the name "Rosa Diamante" (Precious Rose), playing the character Rosaura Sotomayor. In this telenovela, she played alongside Carla Hernandez who was her long lost daughter after she had abandoned her at a boarding school.

== Filmography ==
=== Films ===
Year	Title	Role	Notes
1965	Me ha gustado un hombre	Gloria	Film debut
1968	La cama		
1969	Lío de faldas	Luisa	
1969	Duelo en El Dorado		
1969	Un Quijote sin mancha	Angélica	
1970	El manantial del amor		
1970	El oficio más antiguo del mundo	Estela	
1970	Las chicas malas del padre Méndez		
1970	El cinico	Roberta Uribe	
1970	La vida inútil de Pito Pérez		
1971	Los corrompidos		
1971	OK Cleopatra		
1972	Una mujer honesta		
1978	Los hijos de Sánchez	Consuelo Sánchez	
1983	Balboa	Rita Carlo	
1996	Tú asesina, que nosotras limpiamos la sangre	Marie Clement	
2015	Ana Maria in Novela Land	Sra. De La Roca	
2015	Medardo	Doña Rosa	
2017	Donaire y Esplendor	Massiel	

=== Television ===
Year	Title	Role	Notes
1967	Donde no llega el sol		Television debut
1967	Rebelde		Lead role
1969	Tú eres mi destino		
1969	La frontera de cristal		
1970	Esmeralda	Esmeralda Rivera	Lead role
1972	María Teresa	Maria Teresa / Muñeca Montiel	Lead role
1973	Enamorada		Lead role
1973	María Soledad	María Soledad	Lead role
1974	Gabriela	Gabriela	Lead role
1974	De la misma sangre		Lead role
1974	La Guaricha	Palmira	Lead role
1974	Mi hermana gemela	Marta / Mara	Lead role
1975	Mariana de la noche	Mariana	Lead role
1976	La zulianita	Martha María Dominguez	Lead role
1979	Julia	Julia	Lead role
1981	Ligia Sandoval	Ligia Sandoval	Lead role
1984	Los años felices	Marcela	
1985	Cristal	Victoria Ascanio	Lead role
1985	Doña Perfecta	Perfecta	Lead role
1988	Amándote (film)	Lisette Mistral	Series regular
1990	Amándote II	Lisette	Series regular
1992	Las dos Dianas	Catalina	Lead role
1993	Rosangelica	Cecilia Gel de la Rosa	Series regular
1993	Truhanes		"Dos mujeres ofendidas" (Season 1, Episode 6)
1995	Morelia	Ofelia Santibáñez Campos Miranda	Series regular
1996	Nada personal	María Dolores de los Reyes	Recurring role
1997	Destino de mujer	Aurora	Co-lead role
1999	Rosalinda	Valeria Del Castillo	Series regular
2001	Soledad	Victoria Álvarez Calderón	Series regular
2003	Amor descarado	Morgana Atal	
2004	Inocente de ti	Gabriela Smith	
2006	Ugly Betty	Rich Latina	"Pilot" (Season 1, Episode 1)
2007	Pecados ajenos	Ágata Mercenario	Series regular
2010	Eva Luna	Justa Valdéz	Recurring role
2012	Rosa diamante	Rosaura Sotomayor	Lead role
2015	Voltea pa' que te enamores	Doña Elena Salas	Recurring role
2017	La Fan	Silvia	Special Appearance
2017	Milagros de Navidad	María Collins	
2022	Amores que engañan	Mamá Diana	Episode: "Derecho a ser feliz"
2023	Dramáticas	Yolanda Mistral	
2025	Velvet: El nuevo imperio	Juliette	Recurring role

=== Theater ===
Year	Title	Role	Notes
2019	Divinas		

== Discography ==
- 1992: Tiemblo
- 1970: Esmeralda
