= Lucecita (TV series) =

- Genre: Telenovela
- Created by: Delia Fiallo
- Directed by: Paul Antillano
- Starring: Marina Baura; José Bardina; Esperanza Magaz; Ivonne Attas
- Country of origin: Venezuela
- Original language: Spanish

Production
- Running time: 42-45 minutes
- Production company: Venevisión

Original release
- Release: 1967 – 1968

Lucecita is a Venezuelan telenovela starred by Marina Baura, José Bardina, Esperanza Magaz and Ivonne Attas. It was produced and broadcast on Venevisión for about a year and a half, spanning 1967–1968. The original story, written by Delia Fiallo, has inspired several variations and adaptations through the years, most of them by Fiallo, both for television and cinema. In 1972, Venevisión aired its own remake.

== Summary ==
This story is strongly based in the Cinderella mold. Yet, there are major aspects on the adaptation that make this Spanish soap opera one of the best in the history of telenovelas.

Baura makes a great performance of Lucecita, a naïve girl that leaves her impoverished, rural home to work as a maid for a wealthy and feuding family, who own a cattle-ranching land.

At this point, the man of the house is Gustavo (played by Bardina), who is married to Angelina, She is a woman pretending to be paralyzed, in order to manipulate the feelings of her husband and prevent him from leaving. But while working there, Lucecita falls in love with Gustavo. Then Angelina discovers the romance between Lucecita and Gustavo; she is full of hatred and jealousy, but after learning that Lucecita is her half-sister, her hatred towards her is even harder. But really, here is where real problems begin to arise.

Solid performances by Magaz as Modesta, Lucecita's loyal best friend, and Attas for her role of Angelina. Both reprised their respective roles in tn the 1972 version.

== Main cast ==
- Marina Baura as Lucecita
- José Bardina as Gustavo
- Esperanza Magaz as Modesta
- Ivonne Attas as Angelina

== Additional cast ==
In alphabetical order

- Hilda Breer
- Olga Castillo
- María Eugenia Domínguez
- Gioia Lombardini
- Oscar Mendoza
- Hugo Pimentel
- Suyin Rosa
- Soraya Sanz
- Orlando Urdaneta

== Chronology ==
Year of release	Title	Country	Version	Production company	Main roles	Refs
1967	Lucecita	Venezuela	TV series	Venevisión	Marina Baura; José Bardina	
1968	Estrellita, esa pobre campesina	Argentina	TV series	Proartel C.A.	Martha González; Germán Kraus	
1972	Lucecita	Venezuela	TV series	Venevisión	Ada Riera; Humberto García	
1976	Lucecita	Spain/Argentina	Film	K Films S.A.	Analía Gadé; Juan Luis Galiardo	
1987	Estrellita mía	Argentina	TV series	Crustel S.A.	Alicia Aller; Aldo Barbero	
1994	Lucerito	Colombia	TV series	Coestrellas	Linda Lucía Callejas; Javier Sáenz	
1998	Luz María	Peru	TV series	América Televisión	Angie Cepeda; Christian Meier	
