= Maribel (TV series) =

- Genre: Telenovela; Drama
- Created by: Delia Fiallo
- Written by: Belkis Granda; Ana Mercedes Escámez
- Directed by: Arquímedes Rivero
- Starring: Tatiana Capote; Luis José Santander; Lilibeth Morillo
- Opening theme: "Otra noche contigo" by Melissa
- Country of origin: Venezuela
- Original language: Spanish
- No. of episodes: 160

Production
- Production location: Caracas
- Production company: Venevisión

Original release
- Network: Venevisión
- Release: 1989

Related
- La Zulianita (1977)

Maribel was a 1989 Venezuelan telenovela produced by Venevisión and distributed internationally by Venevisión International. A free version of telenovela La Zulianita produced in 1977, Tatiana Capote and Luis José Santander starred as the main protagonists.

== Plot ==
Maribel suffers a tragedy after her adoptive father dies, leaving the family penniless. she is forced to then look for a job. On her first job at a bar, the owner harasses her and during a fight, she accidentally wounds Jose Daniel who then files a suit against her. She manages to get a second job as a maid in the mansion of the Del Valle family where she meets and falls in love with Luis Alejandro, the eldest son of the family. Their love will be tested by trust, jealousy and secrets from the past. Maribel will be reunited with her father, Rogelio Duarte, a credible lawyer accused of a crime he did not commit by Luis Alejandro's parents, the ambitious Federico and Virginia Del Valle who were also responsible for separating Maribel's parents, Sofia and Rogelio.

== Cast ==
- Tatiana Capote as Maribel Duarte
- Luis José Santander as Luis Alejandro Del Valle
- Yolanda Mendez as Virginia Del Valle
- Raúl Xiques as Federico Del Valle
- Lilibeth Morillo as Andreina Colmenares
- Jean Carlo Simancas as Rogelio Duarte
- Veronica Ortiz
- Rebeca Costoya as Erika
- Henry Soto
- Betty Ruth
- Agustina Martin
- Alberto Marin
