= Bianca Castanho =

Brazilian actress (born 1979)

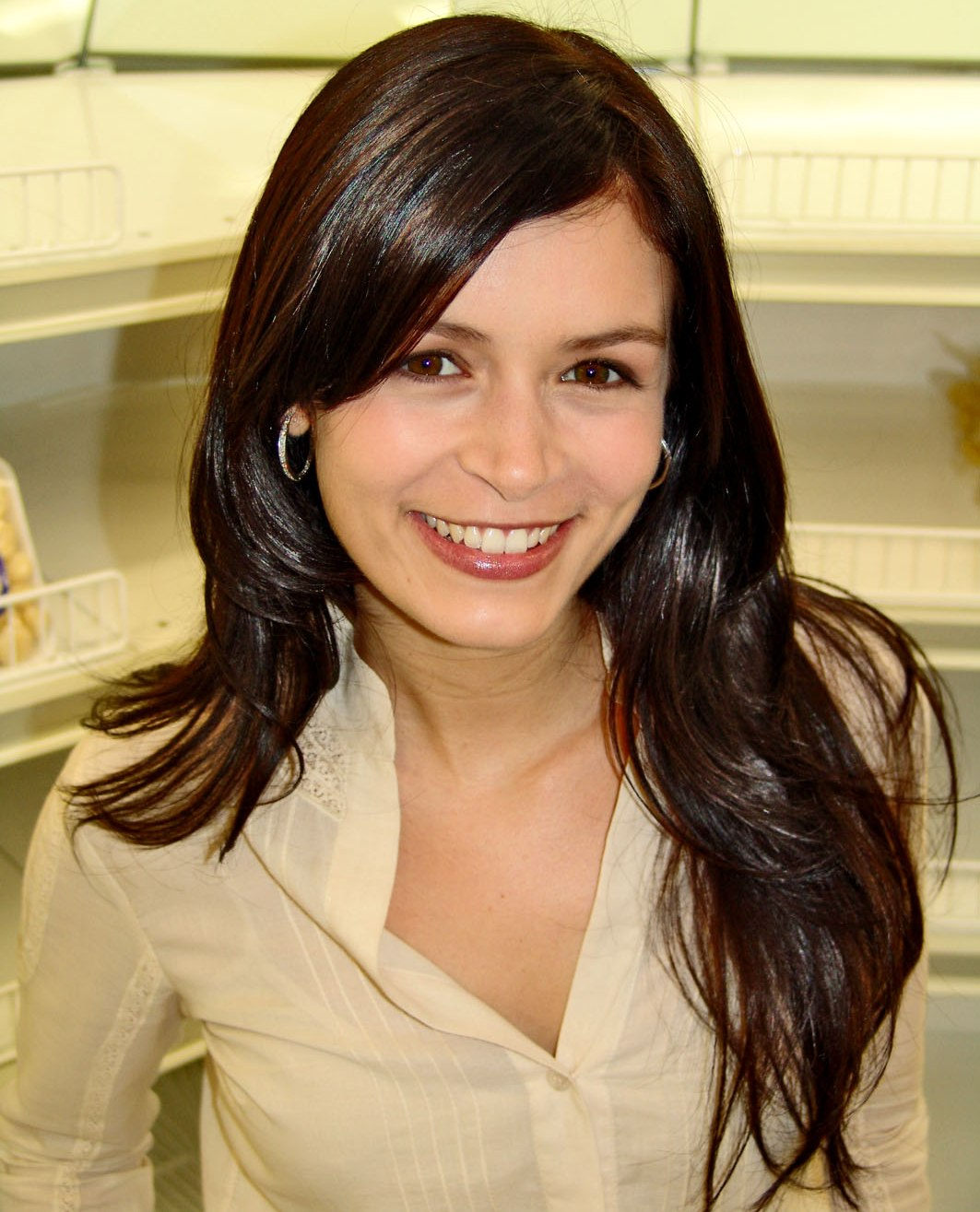
- Born: Bianca Castanho Pereira; January 25, 1979 (age 47); Santa Maria, Rio Grande do Sul, Brazil
- Occupation: Actress
- Years active: 1998-present
- Spouse: Henry Canfield (2009-present)
- Children: 1

Bianca Castanho Pereira (born January 25, 1979, in Santa Maria, Rio Grande do Sul) is a Brazilian actress.

== Filmography ==
=== Telenovelas ===
- 2014 Milagres de Jesus - Zima
- 2013 Dona Xepa - Beatriz Sampaio
- 2012 Rei Davi - Selima
- 2009 Promessas de Amor - Arminda
- 2007 Amor e Intrigas - Antônia Fraga
- 2006 Cristal - Cristina da Silva de Jesus (Cristal)
- 2004 Esmeralda - Esmeralda Álvares Real
- 2003 Canavial de Paixões - Clara Feberman Santos
- 2002 O Beijo do Vampiro - Clarissa Silva (Ciça)
- 2001 Malhação - Valéria Oliveira
- 2001 A Turma do Didi - Juli Santana/Azazel
- 2000 Uga-Uga - Ametista
- 1999 Terra Nostra - Florinda
- 1998 Você Decide - Ana Sampaio
- 1998 Ensino Geral - Presenter

=== Film ===
- A Partilha - Esposa de Carlos (Carlos's wife)
