= José Bardina =

Venezuelan actor

- Born: March 27, 1939; Barcelona, Spain
- Died: December 18, 2009 (aged 70); Miami, Florida, U.S.
- Occupation: Actor
- Years active: 1965–2009
- Children: 1

José Bardina (March 27, 1939 – December 18, 2009) was a Spanish-Venezuelan actor who was a television leading figure.

A native of Barcelona, Spain, Bardina was raised in Caracas, Venezuela.

== Television career ==
He was best known for playing major roles on several soap operas, and was best loved by audiences for his natural charm and the romantic rapport he shared with his female co-stars, like Marina Baura, Lupita Ferrer and Doris Wells.

He was popular in Venezuela, and also in Colombia, Mexico, Peru, Puerto Rico and Spain, after the telenovelas produced by Radio Caracas Televisión and Venevisión reached its peak during the 1970s decade.

== Death ==
Bardina died in Miami, Florida at the age of 70, following complications from bladder cancer.

== Selected appearances ==
- Lucecita (1967)
- Doña Bárbara [TV series] (1967)
- Esmeralda (1970)
- María Teresa (1972)
- Peregrina (1973)
- Mi hermana gemela (1975)
- Mariana de la noche (1975)
- Una muchacha llamada Milagros (1975)
- Cumbres Borrascosas (1976)
- La zulianita (1977)
- La fiera (1978)
- Rosangela (1979)
- Buenos días, Isabel (1980)
- Amor descarado (2003)
- Amor comprado (2008)
