= Inés Duarte, secretaria =

- Genre: Telenovela; Romance; Drama
- Created by: Alicia Barrios
- Directed by: Rafael Gómez
- Starring: Amanda Gutiérrez; Víctor Cámara; Mariano Álvarez; Rebeca Costoya
- Opening theme: Todo es un Circulo by Melissa; Piel Adentro by Ricardo Montaner
- Ending theme: Todo es un Circulo by Melissa
- Country of origin: Venezuela
- Original language: Spanish
- No. of episodes: 238

Production
- Executive producer: Oscar Ibarra Moreno
- Production location: Caracas
- Cinematography: Yasmin Gonzalez
- Running time: 41-44 minutes
- Production company: Venevisión

Original release
- Network: Venevisión
- Release: November 1, 1990 – October 28, 1991

Related
- Bellísima (1991); Buenos días, Isabel (1980) Amor secreto (2015)

Inés Duarte, secretaria is a Venezuelan telenovela produced by Venevisión in 1990 and written by Alicia Barrios as a free version of the telenovela Buenos días, Isabel written by Delia Fiallo. This telenovela lasted 238 episodes and was distributed internationally by Venevisión International.

Amanda Gutierrez and Víctor Cámara starred as the main protagonists with Rebeca Costoya as the main antagonist.

== Synopsis ==
The series follows Inés Duarte, an efficient and dedicated secretary who works for Andrés Martán, a young millionaire who heads a large corporation. Inés has low self-esteem and has little interest in her appearance or relationships with men, partly as a result of her overprotective mother. She is secretly in love with Andrés, who regards her primarily as an indispensable employee. Andrés is a widower with three children and is occupied with personal and professional difficulties, leaving him unaware of Inés's feelings.

As Inés attempts to gain Andrés's affection, she faces a series of personal difficulties and injustices. The story follows her transformation and the changing relationship between the two characters.

== Cast ==
- Amanda Gutierrez as Inés Duarte
- Víctor Cámara as Andrés Martán
- Mariano Alvarez as Carlos Javier Martán
- Rebeca Costoya as Raquel Mendible
- Carolina Lopez as Laura de Martan
- Eva Blanco as Regina Duarte
- Chony Fuentes as Laura de Martán
- Agustina Martin as Victoria Martán
- Judith Vasquez as Samantha Campeche
- Helianta Cruz as Virginia Duarte
- Mauricio Gonzalez as Santiago Luján
- Luis Gerardo Nuñez as Roberto Suárez
- Sandra Juhasz as Zuleica Torres
- Barbara Mosquera as Amelia Ferro
- Viviana Saez as Viviana
- Andreina Sanchez as Adriana Silver
- Juan Carlos Vivas as Andres "Junior" Martán
- Rossana Termini as Elisa Martán
- Asdrubal Blanco as David Martán
- Veruska Garcia as Laurita Martán
- Ricardo Garcia as Cornelio
- Aidita Artigas as Tomasa
- Chumico Romero
- Marcelo Rodriguez as Nico
- Carolina Cristancho
- Nancy Gonzalez as Agustina Termini
- Luis Malave as Hermes
- Marco A. Casanova as Anibal
- Ricardo Blanco
- Henry Salvat
- Jenifer Dinisio as Diana
- Yelitza Hernandez as Sonia
- Rafael Romero
- Elizabeth Morales as Anais
- Carolina Perdigon as Maria Lucia
- Maria Elena Heredia as Nela

== Versions ==
- Amor Secreto (2015):starring Alejandra Sandoval, Miguel de León, Juan Carlos García, and Alexandra Braun.
