= Francis Romero =

Venezuelan actress

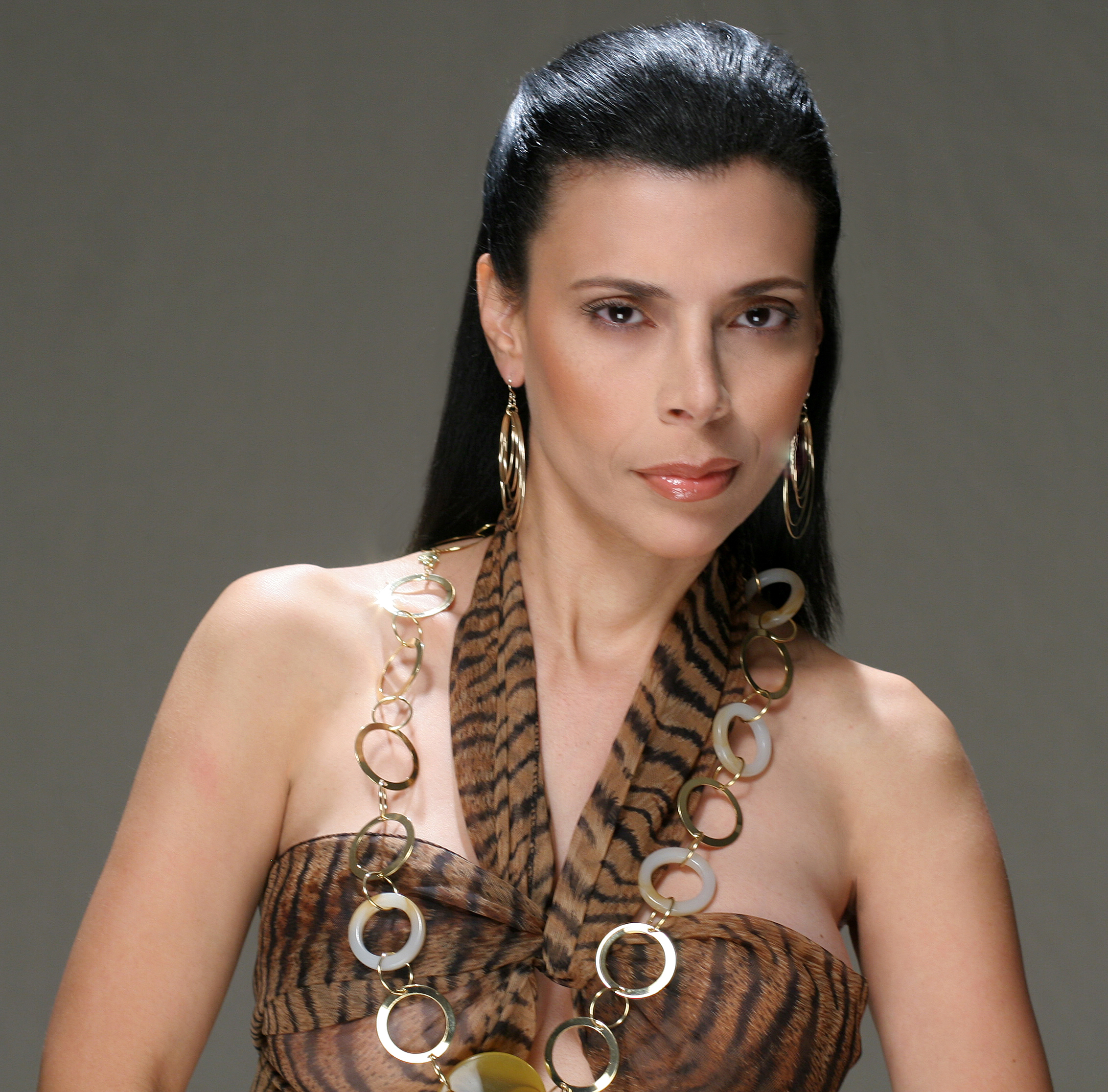
- Born: 7 August 1970 (age 56); Caracas, Venezuela
- Occupation: Actress
- Awards: Premio Municipal de Teatro 2007 and 2009

Francis Romero (Caracas) August 7, 1970 is a Venezuelan actress of theatre, film, radio, and television.

== Early life ==
Francis Romero was born in Caracas. She grew up in the Chacao development with her mother and two brothers, Alessandro and Christian.

Whilst in her fifth year of high school, she enrolled in The National Theater School, now closed. Finishing high school, she began relentlessly looking for training as an actor: she trained in the "Actors Studio" of Enrique Porte, then in 1998 graduated from the University Institute of Theatre (IUDET), now the National Experimental University of the Arts (UNEARTE), with a cum laude degree in Theater Management and Production.

== Career ==
Her beginnings in television were at Radio Caracas Televisión (RCTV), where she played extra roles like "elevator rider 3" and "secretary 4". Little by little she got better roles until winning a lead in the telenovela La dama de rosa, by José Ignacio Cabrujas. However, her first contract was later, for Caribbean, when an actress in the cast got pregnant and Romero was called as an emergency replacement. She worked at RCTV for thirteen years.

Francis then moved to the channel Venevision to join the cast of Aunque mal paguen, by Alberto Barrera Tyzka, where she played "Sagrario".

Similarly, she has starred in several films, including two short films ("La Transfusión", by Hugo Gerdel, and "Onda Corta", by Carolina Vila) and feature films including Operación Billete, by Olegario Barrera; Luna Llena, by Ana Cristina Henríquez; Disparen a Matar, by Carlos Azpúrua; and Móvil Pasional by Mauricio Walerstein.

She is also a certified speaker from the School of Social Communication of the Central University of Venezuela. Her voice and image has appeared in several advertising messages and radio soap operas.

She joined the cast of Gaz, a version of Euripides' The Trojan Women that was shown in the theater La Mama Experimental Theatre Club (La MaMa ETC) in New York City, directed by Elia Schneider.

Romero won the Municipal Theater Award in 2007 for the best supporting actress for her role as Mercedes in the play "La Quinta Dayana", written by Elio Palencia and directed by Gerardo Blanco López

In the 2009 edition, she won again as best supporting actress for her role as Aunt Anyula in the play La Nona, written by Roberto Cossa and directed by Consuelo Trum.

== Filmography ==
=== Film ===
Year	Title	Role	Director
2017	Íntimos Relatos	Obstetrician (cameo)	José Gregorio Hernández
2016	La noche de las dos lunas	Cablecar passenger (cameo)	Miguel Ferrari
2015	Ámbar, el color de una familia perfecta	Úrsula	José Gregorio Hernández
2014	Canción de las sombras		Roque Zambrano
2008	Onda corta	Fermina	Carolina Vila
2006	El color de mi hermana	Mother	Hugo Gerdel
1993	Móvil pasional		Mauricio Walerstein
1992	Luna llena	Consuelo	Ana Cristina Henríquez
1990	Disparen a matar	Luisa	Carlos Azpúrua
1987	Operación Billete	Adela	Olegario Barrera

=== Television ===
Year	Title	Role	Channel
2019	Almas en Pena	Helena	RCTV Internacional
2015	Amor secreto	Chía	Venevisión
2013	Las Bandidas	Matilde	1 episodio Capítulo 29 R.T.I. Televisión
2008	Isa TKM	Severa Rigores	Nickelodeon Latinoamérica
2007	Aunque mal paguen	Sagrario	Venevisión
2006	Túkiti, crecí de una	Benigna	RCTV
2003	Archivos del más allá	Doctora Acevedo (1 episode) RCTV	
2002	La mujer de Judas		RCTV
2001	La soberana	Señora Mijares	RCTV
1999	Mariú	Romelia Bernal	RCTV
1999	Secuestro al amanecer	Alicia Ramírez (1 episode) RCTV	
1997	María de los Ángeles	Anita La Licuadora	RCTV
1996	Juan y el rey de las latas	Camila Valdéz (1 episode) RCTV	
1996	Volver a vivir	Oriana	RCTV
1995	Los milagros del venerable	Leticia	RCTV
1995	Entrega total	Lucrecia	RCTV
1994	De oro puro	Cecilia Azocar	RCTV
1992	Por estas calles	Zaira Magaly	RCTV
1991	La pandilla de los 7	Casandra - Clarita	RCTV
1991	Caribe	Elvira Contreras	RCTV
1990	De mujeres	Ingrid	RCTV
1990	Pobre diabla	Francis	Venezolana de Televisión
1989	Alondra	Regina	RCTV
1989	Amanda Sabater	Caridad	RCTV
1989	Alma mía	Eléctrica	RCTV
1988	Intermezzo de amor	Olga	
1986	La dama de rosa	Sonia	RCTV

== Theatre ==
Year	Title	Character	Author	Country	Theatre
2019	La Yeye	La Yeye	Francis Romero	Venezuela	Micro Teatro Venezuela 20th Cycle
2017	Casamiento	Neysilmar	Germán Anzola	Venezuela	Sala Luisela Díaz del Caracas Theater Club
2017	Último Capítulo	La escritora	Miren Jalón	Venezuela	Micro Teatro Venezuela 10th Cycle
2015	Primero muerta que bañada en sangre	Rosa/Rebeca	Indira Páez	Venezuela	Teatrex El Hatillo
2015	Armadas hasta los dientes		Indira Páez	Venezuela	Micro Teatro Venezuela 4th % 5th cycles
2014	Match	Gabriela Villanueva.	Luis Alberto Rosas	Venezuela	Micro Teatro Venezuela 1st cycle
2014	Todo o Nada	La Chepa	Marcos Purroy	Venezuela	Teatro Nacional de Venezuela
2014	Manos Arriba	Ana Ofelia	Víctor Hugo Rascón Banda	Venezuela	Teatro Premiun Los Naranjos
2013	Todo o Nada	La Chepa	Marcos Purroy	Venezuela	Teatrex El Bosque
2012	Mientras te olvido	Ermenegilda	Andrés Correa Guatarasma	Venezuela	Sala P.H. BOD
2012	La Ensalada	Elena	Rafael Guinand Leoncio Martínez	Venezuela	Sala Experimental BOD
2011	La fea despierta	Selenia	Carlos Roa	Venezuela	Teatro Premium de Los Naranjos
2011	Brujas	Inés	Santiago Moncada (Versión Luis Agustoni)	Venezuela	Teatro Premium de Los Naranjos
2010	Mi cama tiene 3 lados	Ella	Mayling Peña Mejías	Venezuela	Teatrex El Hatillo
2009	Historias de apartamento	Alicia/Leticia	Sandra Bruzón Marcela Sánchez	Venezuela	Sala 1 Fundación Centro de Estudios Latinoamericanos Rómulo Gallegos
2008	La Nona	Anyula	Roberto Cossa	Venezuela	Sala Plural Trasnocho Cultural
2008	La Quinta Dayana	Mamá	Elio Palencia	Venezuela	Sala de Conciertos Ateneo de Caracas
2006	Sagrada Familia	Madre	Mayling Peña	Venezuela	Sala Horacio Peterson Ateneo de Caracas
2006	Diez novias y diez novios	Novia	Alberto Barrera	Venezuela	
2005	Atra Bilis	Nazaria	Laila Ripoll	Venezuela	Teatro Alberto de Paz y Mateos
2004	Vamos a contar mentiras	Julia	Alfonso Paso	Venezuela	Sala 2 Fundación Centro de Estudios Latinoamericanos Rómulo Gallegos
2004	Anselmo y Gata	Egidia	Javier Moreno	Venezuela	Sala Horacio Peterson Ateneo de Caracas
2002 y 2003	Feliz con mi Barranco		Manuel Mendoza Alejandro Aragón Ana M. Escalona	Venezuela EE.UU.	The Revelation Theater N.Y.
2002	La empresa perdona un momento de locura		Rodolfo Santana	Venezuela	Sala Espacio GA80
2000 - 2001	Lo que dejó la tempestad		César Rengifo	Venezuela	Teatro Municipal de Caracas Alfredo Sadel
2000 - 2001	Extraño juguete	Angélica	Susana Torres Molina	Venezuela	Sala Experimental Fundación Centro de Estudios Latinoamericanos Rómulo Gallegos
1998	La Boda		Ibrahím Guerra	Venezuela	Sala Experimental Doris Wells
1995	SONNY diferencias sobre Otelo, el moro de Venecia	Blanca	José Ignacio Cabrujas	Venezuela	Teatro El Paraíso
1994	La casa de Bernarda Alba	Magdalena	Federico García Lorca	Venezuela	Teatro El Paraíso
1989	Gaz		Versión Las Troyanas (Eurípides)	EE.UU.	La MaMa Experimental Theatre Club NYC
1989	Juegos de sociedad		Juan José Alonso Millán	Venezuela	
1988	Baño de damas (play)		Rodolfo Santana	Venezuela	Sala Ana Julia Rojas
1986	Suicidio en Si Bemol		Sam Shepard	Venezuela	Título original Suicide in B Flat
1985	Acelgas con Champagne		Roberto Romero	Venezuela	Teatro Rafael Guinand

== Radio ==
As speaker and producer:

- 2011: "Aquí entre nos con Francis Romero y José Vieira" Clásicos 94.9 FM. Caracas - Venezuela.
- 2010: "SOS con Crisol Carabal y Francis Romero" Familia 94.9 FM. (133 Emisiones diarias) Caracas - Venezuela.
- 2009: "SOS con Crisol Carabal y Francis Romero" Tierra Nueva 94.9 FM. (133 Emisiones diarias) Caracas - Venezuela.

As radionovela actress:

- 2006: "Días de baile" . Radio Gladys Palmera 96.6 FM. Barcelona - España.
- 1999: "Spectrum contra Spectrum y la Máscara Escarlata". Radio Rumbos 670 AM. Caracas - Venezuela.
- 1999: "La Princesa Rebelde". Radio Rumbos 670 AM. Caracas - Venezuela.
- 1999: "Enséñame a Quererte". Radio Rumbos 670 AM. Caracas - Venezuela.
- 1999: "Únicamente Tú". Radio Rumbos 670 AM. Caracas - Venezuela.
- 1999: "La Crónica del Misterio". Radio Rumbos 670 AM. Caracas - Venezuela.

== Awards and recognitions ==
- 2009: Best Actress. Premio Municipal de Teatro. Caracas - Venezuela.
- 2007: Best Actress. Premio Municipal de Teatro. Caracas - Venezuela.
