= Como tú, ninguna =

Venezuelan telenovela

- Genre: Telenovela; Romance; Drama
- Created by: Alberto Gómez; Carlos Romero
- Directed by: José Antonio Ferrara
- Starring: Gabriela Spanic; Eduardo Luna; Miguel de León
- Opening theme: Ven Junto A Mi by Claudio Bermúdez
- Ending theme: Si o No by Nicolas Felizola
- Country of origin: Venezuela
- Original language: Spanish
- No. of episodes: 318

Production
- Executive producer: Aimara Escobar
- Producer: Silvia Carnero
- Production location: Caracas
- Running time: 45 minutes
- Production company: Venevisión

Original release
- Network: Venevisión
- Release: December 7, 1994 – November 7, 1995

Related
- María Celeste; Pecado de Amor; El vuelo de la victoria

Como tú, ninguna is a Venezuelan telenovela created by Alberto Gómez and Carlos Romero, and produced by Venevisión in 1994. The series lasted for 318 episodes and was distributed internationally by Venevisión International.

The telenovela marked the debut of Gabriela Spanic in her first lead role, accompanied by Eduardo Luna and Miguel de León as the protagonists, with Bárbara Teyde, Henry Galué, Fabiola Colmenares and Marita Capote as antagonists.

== Synopsis ==
Gilda Barreto's dream comes true when she marries Raymundo Landaeta, a rich and handsome young man who does not mind her poor upbringing. Their love is deep and sincere but too young and fragile to withstand the evils the couple must face at the hands of Leonidas Landaeta, Raymundo's mother. Leonidas is a selfish, arrogant and domineering woman who has different plans for her son: marry him to Yamilex, a woman of their same social level. She dedicates wholeheartedly to separate Raymundo from Gilda, using Yamilex as her accomplice. Leonidas relentless efforts to break up the marriage succeed within a short period of time, causing Raymundo and Gilda to divorce. Emotionally destroyed, Gilda returns to her former life of poverty, working hard at odd jobs to earn a decent living. Raymundo goes on a long trip abroad and upon his return home, becomes involved with Yamilex. After Raymundo and Yamilex become an item, Gilda finds her real true love, Raul, a lovin successful doctor which falls in love with Gilda instantly and accepts her as she is and accepts the child she had with Raymundo.

== Cast ==
=== Main cast ===
- Gabriela Spanic as Gilda Barreto / Raquel Sandoval
- Miguel de León as Raúl de la Peña
- Eduardo Luna as Raymundo Landaeta
- Elluz Peraza as Mariza Monales
- Henry Galué as Braulio Monales
- Bárbara Teyde as Leonidas de Landaeta

=== Supporting cast ===
- Laura Termini as Amalia
- Carolina López as Alina Fuenmayor
- Miguel Alcántara as Maximiliane Ruiz
- Belén Díaz as Lucrecia de la Peña
- Laura Zerra as Eulalia
- Juan Carlos Vivas as Bernardo Sandoval
- Angélica Arenas as Daniela Sandoval
- Lizbeth Manrique as Katy Sandoval
- David Bermúdez as Álvaro Pacheco " El Tarántula"
- Marita Capote as Silvia Machado
- Aura Elena Dinisio as Silvia Machado
- Hilda Blanco as Asunción Marcheno
- Lucy Orta as Magdalena Machado
- Rita De Gois as Cecilia de Acevedo
- Olga Henríquez as Rosalía
- Mauricio González as juez Gómez
- Hans Christopher as Argenis Sabala
- Estelita Del Llano as Zulema Suárez
- Isabel Hungría as Remigia
- Martha Carbillo as Celsa, criada de Rosalía
- Omar Moynelo as Demetrio Azevedo
- Julio Capote as Señor del Mar
- Verónica Doza as Verónica Beltrán, encargada del Orfanatorio
- Orlando Casín as Doctor Argelis
- José Ángel Urdaneta as Andrés
- Chumico Romero as Laura
- Manolo Manolo as Rafael
- Mónica Rubio as Elsa de la Peña
- Fabiola Colmenares as Jamilex Jil
- Denise Novell as Immaculada Marcheno
- Yalitza Hernández as Lilia
- Diego Acuña as Rigoberto Sabadis

== Remake ==
In 2017, Televisa made a new version of this telenovela entitled El vuelo de la victoria, produced by Nathalie Lartilleux, adapted by María Antonieta Calú Gutiérrez, and starring Paulina Goto, Andrés Palacios and Mane de la Parra.

== Curiosities ==
Throughout the series, Gabriela Spanic met her later husband, Miguel de León, whom she initially found displeased with.

In the series, Gabriela Spanic had a double role. Carlos Romero noticed Spanic in this series, then offered her a double starring role of Paula and Paulina in Mexican telenovela La usurpadora. She also played double starring role in another Mexican telenovela, La intrusa.

The series remains the most popular series in Venezuela and was sold in a total of 80 countries.
