= Juan Pablo Gamboa =

Colombian actor

Juan Pablo Gamboa (born November 24, 1966) is a Colombian actor. He was born in Cali. The second of four children, Juan Pablo Gamboa Cook was raised in a bi-cultural, bilingual household due to his mother, Sandra Cook - originally from Boston who went to Colombia with the Peace Corps and his Colombian father, Andrés Gamboa Ruiz. The Gamboa family from Cali, Colombia, traces its ancestry to the Colombian poet Isaias Gamboa (1872–1904) and more than 30 poets, writers, artists and educators, spanning more than five generations.

He appeared mainly in Mexican Telenovelas including Esmeralda, La usurpadora, Carita de Ángel, La intrusa.

Gamboa studied communications in Hofstra University in New York. His portrayal of Willy in La usurpadora gave him his first TVyNovelas Award nomination for best male antagonist.

He has four children, Santiago and Mariana from his first wife Viviana Escobar and Juan Martin and another son with his second wife.

== Filmography ==
- Marielena (1992) - A receptionist
- Si nos dejan (1995)
- Morelia - Osvaldo Valenzuela (1995)
- Prisioneros del amor - Juan Felipe Sáenz de la Peña (1997)
- Esmeralda - Dr. Álvaro Lazcano (1997)
- La usurpadora - Guillermo "Willy" Montero (1998)
- El diario de Daniela - Pepe Linares (1999)
- Alma rebelde - Alessandro Villareal (1999)
- Carita de Ángel - Noé Gamboa (2000–2001)
- La intrusa - Esteban Fernández (2001)
- Fidel (movie about Fidel Castro) (2002) - USA Ambassador in Cuba
- Vampires: Los Muertos (2002)
- Niña amada mía - César Fábregas (2003)
- Ángel Rebelde - Camilo Salazar (2004)
- Cuando el cielo es azul (2005)
- Pura sangre - Federico Lagos
- Kings of South Beach - Danny Hayes
- Vuelo 1503 - Jorge Pineda
- Súper pá - Nicolás Cortés (2008)
- Las detectivas y el Víctor - Roberto Becker (2009-)
- La Suegra - Dr. Domínguez (2014)
- Reina de corazones - Mauro Montalbán (2014)
- La viuda negra - Detective Norm Jones (2014–2016)
- Ana Maria in Novela Land - as Eduardo (Romantic comedy movie) (2015)
- Loving Pablo (2017) from Virginia Vallejo's memoir Loving Pablo, Hating Escobar.
- El final del paraíso - Mano Negra (2019)
- La nieta elegida - Nicolas Roldan (2021–2022)
