= Marta Pérez =

Marta Pérez may refer to:

- Marta Pérez (singer) (1924–2009), Cuban mezzo-soprano
- Marta Pérez (athlete) (born 1993), Spanish middle-distance runner
