= ¿Qué Pasa, USA? =

- Created by: Manuel 'Cookie' Mendoza
- Written by: Luis Santeiro
- Starring: Ana Margarita Martínez-Casado; Manolo Villaverde; Velia Martínez; Luis Oquendo; Ana Margarita Menéndez; Steven Bauer; Barbara Ann Martin; Connie Ramírez; Bernie Pascual; Glenda Diaz-Rigau
- Theme music composer: Luis Santeiro, performed by Paquito Hechevarría and the Fly Outs Band
- Country of origin: United States
- Original languages: English; Spanish
- No. of seasons: 4
- No. of episodes: 39

Production
- Running time: 27 minutes

Original release
- Network: PBS
- Release: 1976 – 1980

¿Qué Pasa, USA? (Spanish: What's Happening, USA?) is an American situation comedy. It was the first US sitcom to be bilingual, and the first to be produced for PBS. It was produced and taped from 1977 to 1980 in front of a live studio audience at PBS member station WPBT in Miami, Florida and aired on PBS member stations nationwide.

The program explored the trials and tribulations faced by the Peñas, a Cuban-American family living in Miami's Little Havana neighborhood, as they struggled to cope with a new country and a new language. The series is praised as being very true-to-life and accurately, if humorously, portraying the life and culture of Miami's Cuban-American population. Today, the show is cherished by many Miamians as a true, albeit humorous, representation of life and culture in Miami.

== Synopsis ==
The series focused on the identity crisis of the members of the family as they were pulled in one direction by their elders—who wanted to maintain Cuban values and traditions—and pulled in other directions by the pressures of living in a predominantly Anglo-American society. This caused many misadventures for the entire Peña family as they get pulled in all directions in their attempt to preserve their heritage.

== Use of language ==
The series was bilingual, reflecting the code-switching from Spanish use in the home and English at the supermarket ("Spanglish") predominant in Cuban-American households in the generation following the Cuban exodus of the 1960s. The use of language in the show paralleled the generational differences in many Cuban-American families of the era. The grandparents spoke almost exclusively Spanish and were reluctant—at times, even hostile—toward the idea of learning English; an episode featured a dream sequence where Joe, the son of the family, dreams about his grandparents exclusively speaking English (while Joe and Carmen could only speak Spanish). The grandparents' struggle with English often resulted in humorous misunderstandings and malapropisms. The parents' relative fluency in English was laced with strong Cuban accents and alternated between the two languages depending on the situation. The children, having been exposed to American culture for years, spoke primarily in slightly accented colloquial English, but were able to converse relatively competently in Spanish as needed (such as when speaking to their grandparents); however, one of the running gags of the show revolved around their occasional butchering of Spanish grammar or vocabulary.

== Cast ==
=== Main characters ===
- Manolo Villaverde as Pepe Peña — the patriarchal figure of the Peña household
- Ana Margarita Martínez-Casado as Juana Peña — the matriarchal figure of the household
- Luis Oquendo as Antonio — Juana's father and the primary Cuban-born grandfather archetype to Joe and Carmen. As was typical of adult Cuban exiles living in Miami, Antonio is unable to speak English fluently and relies on his daughter and son-in-law to be translators from English to Spanish.
- Velia Martínez as Adela — Juana's mother and the primary Cuban-born grandmother archetype to Joe and Carmen. Like her husband Antonio, she is wholly fluent in Spanish and relies on her daughter and son-in-law to translate. This creates a dynamic that is explored extensively in the fourth episode, appropriately titled "We Speak Spanish", when she remarks on her daughter's competency in English.
- Steven Bauer (credited as Rocky Echevarría) as Joe Peña — the first-generation Cuban-American archetypal son of Pepe and Juana; remains until the 28th episode.
- Ana Margo (credited as Ana Margarita Menéndez) as Carmen Peña — the first-generation Cuban-American archetypal daughter of Pepe and Juana.

=== Recurring characters ===
- Connie Ramírez as Violeta
- Barbara Ann Martin as Sharon
- Glenda Díaz Rigau as Tanto Marta
- Jody Wilson as Mrs. Allen
- Bernardo Pascual as Cousin Ignacio (Iggy) Peña, a recurring role in the fourth and final season

=== Guest stars ===
- Andy García
- Jeff Coopwood
- Norma Zúñiga
- Chamaco García
- Patricia Jiménez-Rojo

=== Writers ===
- Luis Santeiro
- Julio Vera

=== Directors ===
- Bernard Lechowick
- Errol Falcon

== Broadcast history ==
The series initially ran for four seasons from 1976 to 1980 (39 episodes were produced).
