= Daniela Spanic =

Venezuelan model, actress, and TV Host (1973-)

Daniela Spanić
- Born: Daniela Spanić Utrera; December 10, 1973 (age 52); Ortiz, Guárico, Venezuela
- Other name: Dany Spanic
- Years active: 1995–present
- Relatives: Gabriela Spanic (twin sister)

Dani Španić Utrera (born 10 December 1973) is a Venezuelan model, actress and TV host. She is a twin sister of actress Gabriela Spanic.

== Personal life ==
Spanic was born in Caracas and raised in Ortiz, to Croatian father Casimiro Spanic and Venezuelan mother Norma Utrera. She has a twin sister, Gabriela Spanic, one younger sister, Patricia, and a younger brother, Antonio. She became a naturalized citizen of Mexico in 2006.

== Filmography ==
=== TV series ===
- Desde Adentro Con Dani (2013–present)
- La duda (2002) Blanca
- Como tú, ninguna (1995) 1 episode
