= Alexandra Braun =

Venezuelan actress, model and beauty queen

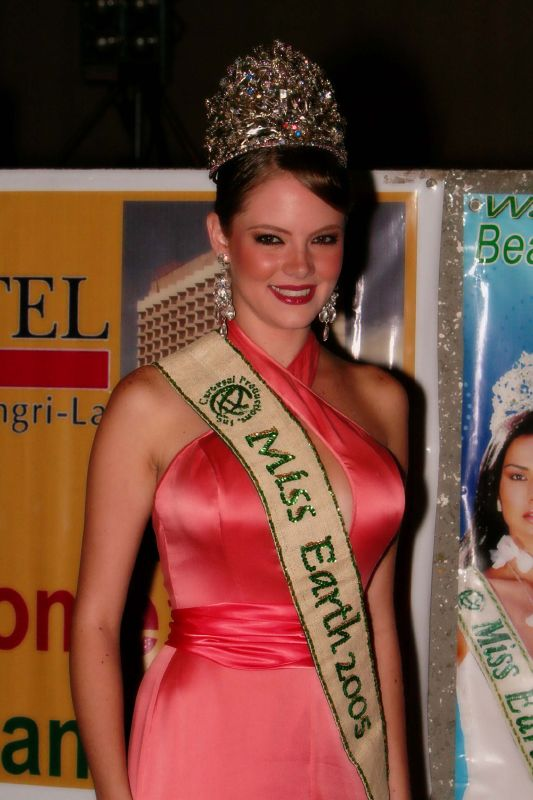
- Braun in 2005
- Born: Alexandra Braun Waldeck; May 19, 1983 (age 43); Caracas, Venezuela
- Height: 1.79 m (5 ft 10 1/2 in)
- Beauty pageant titleholder
- Title: Miss Earth 2005
- Major competitions: Miss Venezuela 2005 (1st runner-up); Sambil Model 2005 (winner); Miss Earth 2005 (winner)

Alexandra Braun Waldeck ([aleɣˈsandɾa ˈβɾawm ˈbaldek], born May 19, 1983) is a Venezuelan actress, model and beauty pageant titleholder who won Miss Earth 2005.

Braun has won four international best actress awards in various film festivals all over the world for her portrayal of the lead role in the movie, "Uma" at the London Film Festival, Monaco International Film Festival, the Milan International Film Festival and the Georgia Latino Film Festival in Atlanta. The film also won recognition in the "Film of the World" category at the International Film Festival of India and won best foreign film at the Burbank International Film Festival in the United States.

== Early life and background ==
Braun grew up in Caracas and graduated cum laude with a bachelor's degree in Marketing and Advertising. Her family migrated to Venezuela from Germany after World War II.

== Pageantry ==
=== Miss Venezuela ===
Braun competed at Miss Venezuela 2005, and represented Nueva Esparta where she placed first runner-up; she was then selected by Sambil Model Caracas to represent Venezuela at Miss Earth held in Manila, Philippines. She was crowned Miss Earth 2005 on October 23, 2005, where eighty contestants from all over the world took part in the competition. Braun also won the Best in Swimsuit. She was the first Venezuelan to win the competition. Her win made Venezuela the second country after Brazil to win all of the "Big Four" pageants.

Braun crowned her successor, Hil Hernández, at Miss Earth 2006 on November 26, 2006, at the National Museum of the Philippines in Manila. Her Miss Earth Venezuela successor, Marianne Puglia, was crowned Miss Earth Fire, the equivalent of 3rd runner up. She now has a career as an actress in Venezuela.

=== Miss Earth 2005 ===
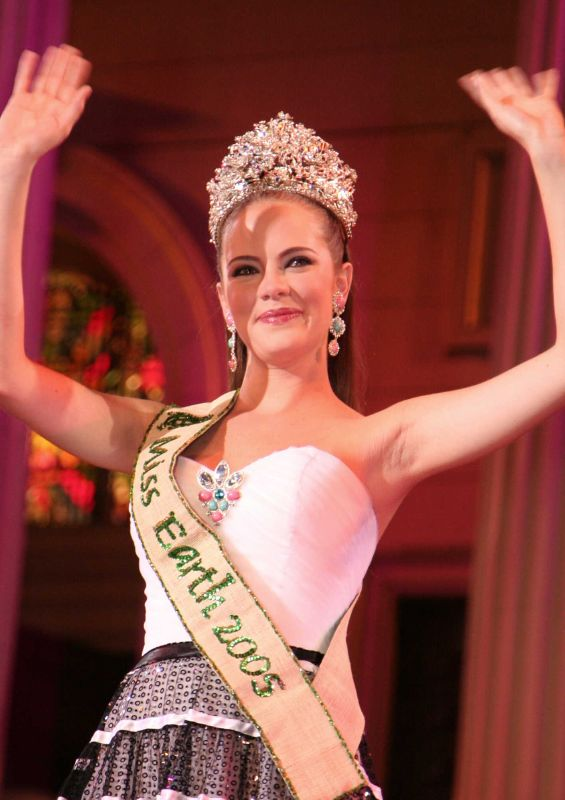
Alexandra Braun, during her final walk as Miss Earth 2005

During her Miss Earth reign, she met Philippine president Gloria Macapagal Arroyo at the Malacañang Palace, which she considered as one of her most memorable experiences. Upon her return to Venezuela after winning the Miss Earth competition, Braun immediately spearheaded a reforestation program in Caracas, Maracaibo and Valencia with the help of Sambil Organization, the franchise holder of Miss Earth Venezuela contest. It was followed by the launching of the SAMI Tree Program, a fund-raising activity that educates children on the importance of protecting trees to save the environment.

In April 2006, she travelled to Singapore, together with the Miss Earth Foundation to co-host the United Nations Environment Programme or UNEP gala event, The Champions of the Earth, an annual awards programme to recognize outstanding environmental leaders at a policy level. She co-hosted the awarding ceremony on April 21, 2006, with Eric Falt, UNEP Director of Communications and Public Information.

As Miss Earth winner, Braun travelled the world to participate and promote environmental awareness programs with the Philippine-based Miss Earth Foundation. She also visited several countries including Canada, Puerto Rico, Chile, Indonesia, Philippines, Singapore, and Venezuela.

== Life after Miss Earth ==
After Miss Earth 2005, Braun launched her own accessories range under the name "DiBraun Accessories" with her twin sister Karina. She also appeared in a variety of magazines after Miss Earth including Philippine's 'Women's Journal', Variedades, Man, Ocean Drive, Maxim, Urbe, and Que Pasa (Chile). Braun is now an established model in Latin America, Europe and Asia, appearing in numerous television spots, magazines and advertising campaigns in countries such as Philippines, Romania, Malaysia, Mexico, Honduras, Costa Rica, Bolivia and her home country of Venezuela.

She started her career as an actress in Venezuela with her first movie directed by Abraham Pulido produced in 2012 and show to public in May 2015, "Hasta que la muerte nos separe" is about a model who falls in love with a boxer based on the novel Othello by William Shakespeare.

She started to make her first appearance in theatre in the play "Boeing Boeing" directed by Tullio Cavalli in August 2013. In 2014 she started her first soap opera called "Amor Secreto" on the TV channel Venevisión as Alejandra Altamirano as the antagonist of the history. It was launched in May 2015. In 2016 she was called for performing her second teather play called "Cronicas desquiciadas".

In 2016 she made her second movie as the lead role in the movie "UMA" directed by Alain Maiki.

In January 2017 started her third feather play called "Relatos Borrachos". In May started a new TV project called "Ellas aman, ellos mienten" and also at the same time started a movie project "Blindados" directed by Carlos Malave. In October 2018 she became Member of the ACACV Venezuelan Arts and Science Cinematography Academy

== Career background ==
=== Beauty pageants ===
Braun competed in the following pageants:

Month & Year	Pageant	Placement
October 2005	Miss Earth 2005	Winner
September 2005	Miss Venezuela 2005	1st Runner-Up
July 2005	Miss Earth Venezuela 2005	Winner

=== Catalogs ===
Year/s	Title	Country
2009-2011	Miss Lulu	Venezuela
2009-2010	Avon Hogar	Venezuela
2007-2008	Vestimenta	Venezuela
2008	Swim	Catálogo Interno
2008	Canuan	Catálogo Trajes de Baño
2006, 2007	Macla	Venezuela
2006	Avon Beauty	Venezuela
2005, 2006, 2007, 2008	Beco	Venezuela
2004, 2005	Jade	Venezuela

=== Ambassador non-profit organizations ===
Year/s	Organization	Cause/Program
2008–present	SENOSAYUDA	Breast Cancer
2007–present	UNO MAS Foundation	Down Syndrome
2012	SIDA	Acción Solidaria (Solidarity Action
2007–present	Asociación Civil	Ronald McDonald (Program “Give a Hand”)
2008–present	UMA Foundation	(Dinner with the Stars)

=== Filmography ===
In December 2017, Braun won Best Actress at the Monaco International Film Festival called the Angel Film Awards for her performance in a love story movie Uma, which was produced in Italy by the production company Epic In Motion & AMZ along with Natalia Denegri's Trinitus Productions. The movie also won the Best Film, Best Editing, Best Supporting Actress and Best Supporting Actor awards.

Braun's performance in the movie Uma further earned her best actress awards in the Milan International Film Festival and the Georgia Latino Film Festival in Atlanta.

In February 2018, she then won the Best Actress for the fourth time for the movie Uma at the London Film Festival which is produced by the British Film Institute which screens more than 300 films, documentaries and shorts from approximately 50 countries.

Films
Year/s	Title	Role	Country
May 2007	Puras Joyitas	Miss Amazonas	Venezuela
June 2008	Comando X	Spanish CNN Journalist	Venezuela
March 2009	La Pura Mentira	Cheerleader	Venezuela
2011	Secretos de Confesión	Cameo	Venezuela
2011	Ubicua	Margareth	Venezuela
2012	obsesión	Annie	Venezuela
2013	Sueño de Selva	Ulrike Koch	Canaima, Venezuela
2013	Hasta que la muerte nos separe	Diana Montenegro	Venezuela
2014	Amor secreto	Alejandra Altamirano	Venezuela
2016	Uma	Uma	Italy
2017	Blindados	Alicia	Venezuela
2020	Intriga tras cámaras	Teresa	Venezuela
2021	Carabobo, Caminos De Libertad	Marquesa	Venezuela

== See also ==
- Miss Venezuela
- List of famous Venezuelans

Awards and achievements
Preceded by (Brazil) Priscilla Meirelles	Miss Earth; 2005	Succeeded by (Chile) Hil Hernández
Preceded by Enid Herrera	Miss Earth Venezuela; 2005	Succeeded by Marianne Puglia
Preceded by Nathalia Sánchez	Miss Nueva Esparta; 2005	Succeeded by Andreína Vilachá
