= Manolo Villaverde =

Cuban actor (1934–2026)

- Born: 11 August 1936; Havana, Cuba
- Died: 10 January 2026 (aged 89); Daytona Beach, Florida, U.S.
- Occupation: Actor

Manolo Villaverde (11 August 1936 – 10 January 2026) was a Cuban actor known for his role on the television show ¿Qué Pasa, USA? His character was named Pepe Peña. The cast, Villaverde included, worked hard to not overact. Villaverde and the other cast members were chosen for the show specifically because of their vast experience in theater in both Cuba and the United States.

== Background ==
Villaverde was born in Havana on 11 August 1936. He began his acting career on Cuban television in 1958, but immigrated to the United States in 1964, after the rise of Fidel Castro.

== Career ==
Villaverde played the character Rafael in Amores y Amorios on 7 August 1966. In 1976, he was cast as Pepe Peña on ¿Qué Pasa, USA?, a sitcom produced for public television in Miami; it ran until 1980, and was the first bilingual American sitcom.

Villaverde had a reoccurring role on season 4 of the crime drama Wiseguy as airline executive Rafael Santana, the father of the show's main character, Michael Santana. He also played Abuelo on the Nickelodeon children's show Gullah Gullah Island. He continued to work as an actor into the 2000s.

== Personal life and death ==
Villaverde spent time working on a historical novel about classical music composers. Villaverde enjoyed painting, keeping a vast book and film collection, and traveling.

Villaverde died at his home in Daytona Beach, Florida, on 10 January 2026, at the age of 89.

== Awards ==
Manolo Villaverde won an Emmy Award for his performance in ¿Qué Pasa, USA? at the 1978 Second Annual regional Emmy Awards. Manolo Villaverde was one of the cast member winners, as well as Ana Margarita Martinez-Casado, and Luis Oquendo.
