= María Celeste (TV series) =

- Genre: Telenovela; Romance; Drama
- Created by: Valentina Párraga
- Written by: Valentina Párraga; Yoyiana Ahumada; Luis Zelkowickz; Daniel Alvarez; Gabriela Domíngez
- Directed by: Arquímedes Rivero; Rafael Gómez
- Starring: Sonya Smith; Miguel de León; Fedra López; Adolfo Cubas
- Opening theme: Piensalo dos Veces performed by Fernando
- Country of origin: Venezuela
- Original language: Spanish
- No. of episodes: 152

Production
- Executive producer: Tahiri Díaz Acosta
- Producer: Mariana Monzon
- Cinematography: Juan de Freitas
- Production company: Venevisión

Original release
- Network: Venevisión
- Release: May 2 – December 7, 1994

Related
- Como tú, ninguna

María Celeste is a Venezuelan telenovela written by Valentina Párraga and produced by Venevisión in 1994. The series lasted for 152 episodes and was distributed internationally by Venevisión International.

Sonya Smith and Miguel de León starred as the protagonists with Fedra López and Adolfo Cubas as the antagonists.

== Synopsis ==
Maria Celeste is the daughter of Cesar Augusto, a '70s rock musician, and Celina, the beautiful young daughter of Don Patricio Hidalgo de la Torre, a wealthy landowner. After leaving the comforts of home, she finds herself very lonely after her husband's death. Celina dies in a strange accident leaving her daughter with her best friend, Martirio Paniagua. Martirio adopts Maria Celeste as her own and she grows up with her adoptive sister, Irania in Bogotá, Colombia. While looking for a job, Maria Celeste arrives at the Hidalgo Consortium. By coincidence, she meets her prospective boss, Dr. Santiago Azpurua, who is also Don Patricio's godson. Don Patricio discovers his granddaughter's existence and begins to search for her. When he finds Martirio and the two girls, he brings them to live with him. But Irania manipulates the situation to appear as the heiress and her mother becomes her accomplice unwillingly. Maria Celeste will be the target of doubts and lies, weaving a web of confusion and deceit. After a brief romance with Santiago, they break up after Irania makes believe Maria Celeste is having an affair with Horacio. In her distress, Maria Celeste decides to leave the Hidalgo residence although she is aware of her roots. She arrives at Caribe Lezama's ranch who hires her as his assistant, and makes his fortune available to her so she can plot her revenge. The final showdown will be decisive as Don Patricio discovers the truth and finds Maria Celeste's forgiveness. Santiago calls off his wedding to Irania and sets out to find his true love, Maria Celeste. She, in turn, is engaged to Caribe out of gratitude. But Caribe realizes she does not love him and lets her go so she can be with Santiago. Truth, love, passion, intrigue and lies heavily influence the outcome of this story.

== Cast ==
- Sonya Smith as María Celeste Paniagua
- Miguel de León as Santiago Azpurua
- Fedra López as Irania Paniagua
- Adolfo Cubas as Horacio
- Aroldo Betancourt as Manaure
- Rafael Briceño as Patricio Hidalgo
- Ernesto Balzi as Tiberio
- Orangel Delfín as Rodolfo
- Mauricio González as Cupertino
- Carolina Mota as Ximena
- Belén Díaz as Martirio Paniagua
- Angélica Arenas as Consuelo
- Ileana Jacquet as Herminia de Azpurua
- Aidita Artigas as Sarita
- Cristina Ovin as Octavia
- Sandra Juhaz as Mariu
- Gaspar González as Manuel
- Jose Ángel Urdaneta as Samario
- Freddy Romero as Isaías
- Diego Acuña as Valladares

Special Appearances

- Gabriela Spanic as Celina Hidalgo
- Yamandu Acevedo as Doctor Andres
- Delia López as Amelia
- Luis Malave as Casto
- Mónica Rubio as Veronica
- Luis Rivas as don Nino
- Eduardo Luna as Cesar Augusto
- Lotario
- Miguel David Díaz as Larry
- Gabriel Murati as Chuito
- Geronimo Gómez as Malote
- Kenya Urbina
- Pierangela Napoli
