= Amor secreto (TV series) =

- Genre: Telenovela
- Created by: Alicia Barrios
- Written by: César Sierra; Juan Carlos Duque; Mayra Villavicencio
- Directed by: Carlos Izquierdo
- Starring: Miguel de León; Alejandra Sandoval; Juan Carlos García; Alexandra Braun
- Opening theme: "¿Para qué?" by Leo José
- Country of origin: Venezuela
- Original language: Spanish
- No. of episodes: 150

Production
- Executive producer: Manuel Fedérico Fraiz-Grijalba
- Production locations: Caracas, Venezuela
- Cinematography: Lupe Villalobos
- Editors: Carlos Jaimes; Carlos Garcia

Original release
- Network: Venevisión
- Release: June 15, 2015 – February 15, 2016

Related
- Buenos días, Isabel (1980); Ines Duarte, Secretaria (1991)

Amor secreto is a Venezuelan telenovela produced by Manuel Fedérico Fraiz-Grijalba for Venevisión. It is a remake of the 1980 telenovela Buenos días, Isabel. The telenovela is adapted by César Sierra, Juan Carlos Duque and Mayra Villavicencio.

Alejandra Sandoval and Miguel de León star as the main protagonists while Alexandra Braun, Juan Carlos García and Caterina Valentino star as the main antagonists.

The telenovela is recorded in high definition. Production of Amor secreto began on August 1, 2014. Venevisión began airing Amor secreto from June 15, 2015 at 9:00 pm, with the final episode aired on February 15, 2016. The telenovela premiered in the United States on November 30, 2015 airing on Estrella TV.

== Plot ==
Irene Gutiérrez is a hardworking secretary any executive would be happy to have. However, she has low self-esteem believing she is not attractive to men. She is secretly in love with her boss, millionaire Leonardo Ferrándiz, a widower who is still grieving over the loss of his wife and struggling to raise his 5 children.

== Cast ==
=== Main cast ===
- Miguel de León as Leonardo Ferrándiz Aristizábal
- Alejandra Sandoval as Irene Gutiérrez Vielma
- Juan Carlos García as Rodrigo Basáñez
- Alexandra Braun as Alejandra Altamirano

=== Also main cast ===
- Carmen Julia Álvarez as Trinidad Gutiérrez Vielma
- Karina Velásquez as Virginia Gutiérrez
- Rosmeri Marval as María Lucía Gutiérrez Vielma
- Antonio Delli as Carlos Ernesto Ferrándiz Aristizábal
- Nathalie Martínez as Agustina Villegas
- Yajaira Orta as Jimena Aristizábal de Ferrándiz

=== Supporting cast ===
- Rosario Prieto as Coromoto
- Juan Carlos Gardié as Anzola
- Verónica Órtiz as Zulay Martinez
- Rosanna Zanetti as Altair
- Claudio De La Torre as Felipe Rincón
- José Vicente Pinto as Pablo Finol
- Mandy Mesa as Maribel Cruz
- Orlando Delgado as Leo Ferrándiz
- Luis Mayer as Julio Ferrándiz Villegas
- Alejandro Díaz Iacocca as Fernando
- Ornella de la Rosa as Sandra Martínez
- Hecham Aljad as Jorge Arismendi
- Maribel Bottoni as Oriana Castellanos
- Nelson Faria as Lucas Ferrándiz Villegas
- Isabella Meserón as Rebeca "Keka" Ferrándiz Villegas
- Jhonny Texier as Miguel Ferrándiz Villegas

=== Special participation ===
- Caterina Valentino as Rebeca Villegas de Ferrándiz
- Julio Alcázar as Adolfo Casares
- Anthony Lo Russo as Tony Armas
- José Vieira as Julián
- Gioia Arismendi as Paula Guerrero
- Mayra Africano as Gloria Viloria
- Jerónimo Gil as Dr. Edgar Ventura
- Magaly Serrano as Ramona Fuentes "La Traga Venao"
