= ¿Hay Corazón? =

- Presented by: Caterina Valentino
- Country of origin: Venezuela
- Original language: Español

Production
- Production company: Televen

Original release
- Release: February 14 – June 27, 2012

¿Hay Corazón? was a Venezuelan dating game show produced and aired by Televen in 2012, and hosted by Caterina Valentino. The show premiered on 14 February 2012, and it was aired Monday through Friday at 7:00 p.m..

On 30 July 2012, Televen removed the show from its regular programming, following a notification by the CONATEL, Venezuela's telecommunications regulatory body, that it had to be moved to the adult apt time frame of 11:00 p.m. to 5:00 a.m.. Televen's general manager, Leonardo Bigott, declared that they had taken the official regulations into account when the show was first announced, and that the show's contents complied with what is established by law.
