= La usurpadora (1998 TV series) =

- Genre: Telenovela; Romance; Drama
- Created by: Ines Rodena
- Written by: Carlos Romero; Dolores Ortega
- Directed by: Beatriz Sheridan
- Starring: Gabriela Spanic; Fernando Colunga
- Opening theme: "La usurpadora" by Pandora
- Country of origin: Mexico
- Original language: Spanish
- No. of episodes: 102 + Más allá de... La usurpadora

Production
- Producer: Salvador Mejía Alejandre
- Production locations: Cancún, Mexico; Mexico City, Mexico; Cuernavaca, Mexico; Monterrey, Mexico; Acapulco, Mexico; Monte Carlo, Monaco; Paris, France; Hawaii, United States
- Cinematography: Jesús Nájera Saro; Jesús Acuña Lee; Alejandro Frutos; Ernesto Arreola; Manuel Barajas
- Running time: 45 minutes
- Production company: Televisa

Original release
- Network: Canal de las Estrellas
- Release: February 9 – July 24, 1998

Related
- María Isabel; Huracán; El privilegio de amar

La usurpadora (English: The Usurper; international title: Deceptions) is a Mexican romantic drama telenovela produced by Salvador Mejia Alejandre and originally broadcast on Canal de las Estrellas from February 9 to July 24, 1998.

It starred Gabriela Spanic and Fernando Colunga, and was based on La intrusa, a novela originally broadcast in Venezuela which was itself a remake of Radio Caracas Televisión's 1971 telenovela La Usurpadora, which starred Marina Baura and Raúl Amundaray. This was one of the last telenovelas to feature Libertad Lamarque, who here portrayed the character of Abuela Piedad Bracho, until Carita de ángel.

Inspired by the book The Scapegoat, it revolves around a pair of twin sisters who were separated when they were young, and as adults the good sister is forced to act as a "replacement" for her wealthy twin who wants to temporarily leave her husband and his family to enjoy a life of luxury with multiple lovers. The telenovela had huge success in Mexico with ratings of 38.4 and has been exported and dubbed in various languages across the world.

It was the first on-screen collaboration between Colunga and Spanic, who both later worked in Soy tu Dueña.

== Plot ==
Paola and Paulina are twins who were separated at birth. Paulina is a good-hearted and honest woman who lives in poverty and is engaged to a simple man, Osvaldo (who's seeing another woman). Paola, on the other hand, is a rich, frivolous and evil woman who has many lovers, including her brother-in-law, Willy. She is married to Carlos Daniel Bracho, a wealthy widower.

When the twins cross paths by chance, Paola attempts to convince Paulina into taking her place at the Brachos' house, so she can take a year-long vacation with her new lover, Alessandro. At first, Paulina refuses because she can't leave her deathly ill mother; but she's later blackmailed and threatened with jail after Paola puts her bracelet in Paulina's purse and accuses her of theft. Abandoned by her fiancé Osvaldo who leaves her to be with his mistress and left with nothing after the death of her mother, Paulina submits to Paola's plan. She is, however, unaware of the destruction the Bracho household was under (thanks to Paola) and decides to work throughout the year righting all wrongs. Paulina (posing as Paola) strives to convince everyone that she has "changed" and become a "new person". During the year, Paulina falls in love with Carlos Daniel. She cures Piedad from alcoholism, saves the Bracho factory from financial ruin, and cuts ties with all of Paola's lovers. No matter how hard she tries, she can't make peace with Estefania (Carlos Daniel's sister) because the real Paola had an affair with Willy, Estefania's husband. Nonetheless, she continues to try to make amends.

Paulina, being the honorable and decent woman that she is, refuses to be intimate with Carlos Daniel, telling him that she needs a year due to her "illness". Carlos Daniel, unaware she is not really Paola, resents her and falls back into the arms of Gema, Paola's frenemy, who's always trying to seduce Carlos Daniel, encouraged by Estefania.

Meanwhile, the real Paola is in Monaco partying with Alessandro. One night after a party, Paola, scared because she had previously dreamt this would happen, gets in a car crash with Alessandro in the passenger seat. They end up in a hospital in Monaco, where she spends months and recovers after multiple surgeries, although her lover Alessandro ends up paralyzed and is reliant on a wheelchair. Paola, no longer interested in him, plans her return to Mexico to take back her place as the real Paola Bracho.

Paola's plan is discovered and Paulina escapes from Mexico, but Carlos Daniel's son, Carlitos, tries to find Paulina, who he thinks is his real mother. With a broken foot, he falls from a hill, hits his head on a rock, and loses his memory. An old lady finds him and cures him.

Paola returns and restarts wreaking havoc: she finds out that Carlitos and Paulina are missing. Eventually, Paulina hears about Carlitos and returns to the Bracho House. Paola goes to travel the world with her famous lover Douglas Maldonado, so Paulina pretends to be Paola again because Carlos Daniel's grandmother Piedad doesn't want Paulina to go to jail. Paulina tells the whole family that Carlos Daniel hated Paulina at first, but after finding Carlitos, they both share their secret love for each other. Gema and Willy contact the Police. Willy beats Estefania up and she is hospitalized. Estefania doesn't turn Paulina to the authorities, after Paulina donates blood to her and her baby. Estefania later reconciles with Paulina.

On the same day, Paola eventually returns, pretending to be paralyzed and trying to take her place back. The next day, Paulina is arrested. While in prison, Paulina and Carlos Daniel discover a mysterious letter by Paulina's mother, written before she died. In the letter, it is explained that Paola and Paulina are twins, but were separated at birth. Paola is caught standing on her feet, putting on make-up, by her nurse Elvira. Paola tells her she will give her money to keep her mouth shut. When Paola finds out that Paulina is her twin, she gets furious. Many men come forward to help hire a lawyer for Paulina so she can be free. Later, Paulina is cleared of all charges. Paola decides to go to the Bracho house with Elvira. Paulina takes Carlitos to her hotel to avoid Paola, so Paola stays in a wheelchair to prove that she is disabled.

Returning to her old ways, Paola inflicts damage on the family and on Paulina. Later, the whole Bracho family is horrified to see Paola walk. Elvira tells the whole family the truth about Paola never being paralyzed. Paola overhears this, so she and Willy set out to get revenge on Paulina, Carlos Daniel and Paulina's lawyer because she was set free. They also plot to kill Elvira for being a traitor. Paola takes Elvira away to kill her but, while in the car travelling at a high speed, Paola reveals to Elvira that she overheard her snitching and she is going to die because of it. Elvira tries to stop the car but they lose control whilst speeding up and the car hits a wall, rolling violently down a hill, where it explodes. Carlos Daniel arrives to the Bracho house. Farmers discover the wreckage of the car and Elvira's corpse. Paola however is found alive in a critical state. Everyone later finds out about Paola's car accident.

Paola is transferred to a Central Hospital. There, she tells everyone the truth about her plan with Willy. The police arrests Willy and he's sentenced to 8 years in prison. Paola is forgiven by her sister and her husband, and dies. Paulina is finally free to marry Carlos Daniel, and peace is finally restored at the Bracho house.

== Production ==
Gabriela Spanic has a twin sister in real life, Daniela Spanic, who is a Venezuelan model. Daniela was approached by the producers of the show to appear in one scene where Paola and Paulina physically fight, as the sequence would have been too difficult to achieve by camera trickery.

La usurpadora was nicknamed "The Queen of the Ratings" while broadcast for Univision in 1999.

La usurpadora wasn't the first of Spanic's telenovelas playing twins; she had already played two identical women in Como tú, ninguna, but they were non-relatives as in La usurpadora. She played the roles just in the last stage of the story. Gabriela later starred in Televisa's 2001 La intrusa, where she once again took on roles similar to La usurpadora, except from the fact that both sisters were good characters.

== Impact ==
La Usurpadora has become one of the most exported Televisa telenovelas and has been licensed by 125 countries and dubbed into 25 languages.

== Remake ==
A remake, ¿Quién eres tú? (Who Are You?), premiered on the UniMás network (formerly TeleFutura) as part of its relaunch. It starred Laura Carmine and Julián Gil. It premiered on January 7, 2013, but was removed from the network's lineup a week later due to poor ratings. It was replaced in its timeslot by a rebroadcast of Rosario Tijeras. Only ten episodes were aired on UniMás. Although the network has not made an official statement as to the telenovela's fate, it is presumed it has been cancelled.

== Sequel ==
Más allá de... La usurpadora logo

La Usurpadora was followed by a two-hour special, Más allá de... La usurpadora, which is set a year after the events of the original telenovela. Again produced by Salvador Mejia Alejandre and directed by Beatriz Sheridan, it starred many familiar cast members, including Gabriela Spanic and Fernando Colunga, and introduced a new character, Raquel, played by Yadhira Carrillo.

=== Synopsis ===
Paulina and Carlos Daniel are blissfully happy with their new baby girl, Paulita. Problems arise when Paulina falls ill and consults a doctor who tells her that she has cancer and will die in a few months. Paulina keeps her illness a secret from her family, but asks Raquel, Paulita's caregiver, to marry Carlos Daniel after she dies. Raquel, who has been secretly in love with Carlos Daniel, is delighted. When Paulina lets Abuela Piedad in on her secret, Abuela Piedad insists that her family deserves to know. Paulina has a panic attack, and sees a vision of Paola in a mirror, telling her that she will see her in hell for robbing her of her family. When Carlos Daniel learns of her illness, he comforts Paulina and they decide to make the best of the time they have remaining together.

Raquel cannot wait to take over Paulina's role, so she puts poison in Paulina's wine. Paulina drinks and immediately faints, but Raquel faints as well. Both women are taken to the hospital, where they learn that Paulina is not sick, but is in fact pregnant. However, Raquel has accidentally swallowed the poison; she seeks forgiveness and eventually makes a full recovery.

Back at the Bracho home, Carlos Daniel and Paulina reveal the happy news to everyone. Overjoyed, the family takes a picture and it says "And they lived happily for the rest of their lives". The credits roll and the audience cheers.

== Cast ==
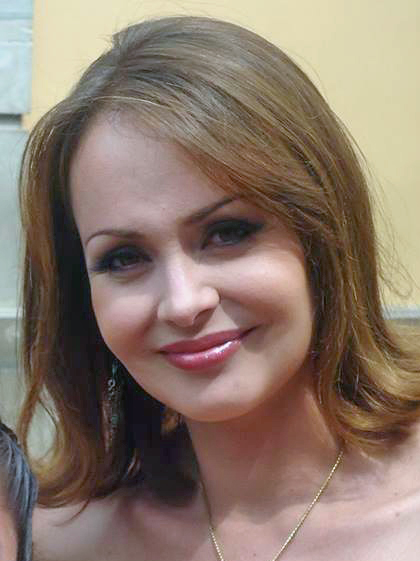

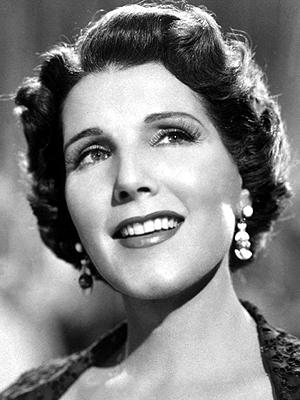
Gabriela Spanic (top) played the twins Paulina and Paola, and Libertad Lamarque (bottom) played the grandmother Piedad.

Actor	Character
Gabriela Spanic	Paulina Martínez / de Bracho / "Paola Bracho" / "La Usurpadora"
Gabriela Spanic	Paola Martínez / Paola Montaner de Bracho / "Paola Bracho"
Fernando Colunga	Carlos Daniel Bracho
Libertad Lamarque	Piedad Bracho
Chantal Andere	Estefania Bracho de Montero
Juan Pablo Gamboa	Guillermo 'Willy' Montero
Marcelo Buquet	Rodrigo Bracho
Dominika Paleta	Gema Durán Bracho
Mario Cimarro	Luciano Alcantara
Paty Díaz	Lalita Perez
Alejandro Ruiz	Leandro Gomez
Giován D'Angelo	Donato D'Angeli
Anastasia	Viviana Carillo de Gomez
Jessica Jurado	Patricia de Bracho
Antonio De Carlo	Osvaldo Resendiz
Magda Guzmán	Fidelina
María Solares	Lisette Bracho
Sergio Miguel	Carlitos Bracho
Nuria Bages	Paula Martinez
Ninón Sevilla	Cachita Cienfuegos
María Luisa Alcalá	Filomena Tamayo
Tito Guízar	Panchito
Enrique Lizalde	Alessandro Farina
Adriana Fonseca	Veronica Soriano
Raquel Morell	Carolina Carrillo
Jaime Garza	Merino
Renata Flores	Estela
Javier Herranz	Dr. Varela
Arturo Peniche	Edmundo Serrano
Miguel de León	Douglas Maldonado
Silvia Derbez	Chabela Rojas
Silvia Caos	Cenobia Rojas
Irán Eory	Lourdes de Reséndiz
René Muñoz	Luis Felipe Benítez "El Mojarras"
Azela Robinson	Elvira
Rafael Amador	Galicia
Miguel Córcega	Braulio
Rebeca Manríquez	Genoveva Sarmiento / La Tamales
Maricruz Nájera	Emiliana
Angelina Peláez	Ricarda
Humberto Elizondo	Silvano Pina
Andrea García	Celia Alonzo
Sara Montes	Eloina
Laura Zapata	Fiscal Zoraida Zapata
Consuelo Duval	Macrina Olvera
Emiliano Lizárraga	Pedro
Irma Torres	Eulalia
Fernando Torres Lapham	Fulgencio Mendive
Óscar Morelli	Juez Castro
Hector Parra	Lic. Juan Manuel Montesinos
Yadhira Carrillo	Raquel

== Awards and nominations ==
Year	Award	Category	Nominated	Result
1999	17th TVyNovelas Awards	Best Telenovela	Salvador Mejía Alejandre	Nominated
1999	17th TVyNovelas Awards	Best Actress	Gabriela Spanic	Nominated
1999	17th TVyNovelas Awards	Best Actor	Fernando Colunga	Nominated
1999	17th TVyNovelas Awards	Best Antagonist Actress	Gabriela Spanic	Nominated
1999	17th TVyNovelas Awards	Best Antagonist Actor	Juan Pablo Gamboa	Nominated
1999	17th TVyNovelas Awards	Best Leading Actress	Libertad Lamarque	Nominated
1999	17th TVyNovelas Awards	Best Supporting Actress	Chantal Andere	Nominated
1999	17th TVyNovelas Awards	Best Supporting Actor	Marcelo Buquet	Nominated
1999	17th TVyNovelas Awards	Best Direction of the Cameras	Jesús Nájera Saro; Manuel Barajas	Won
