= Buenos días, Isabel =

- Genre: Telenovela
- Created by: Delia Fiallo
- Written by: Delia Fiallo; Ana María Escámez
- Directed by: Daniel Farías
- Starring: Flor Núñez; José Bardina
- Opening theme: "Siempre acabo por llorar" by José Luis Rodríguez
- Country of origin: Venezuela
- Original language: Spanish
- No. of episodes: 60

Production
- Production location: Caracas
- Production company: Venevisión

Original release
- Network: Venevisión
- Release: 1980 – 1980

Related
- Inés Duarte, secretaria (1990); Amor secreto (2015)

Buenos días, Isabel is a Venezuelan telenovela written by Cuban writer Delia Fiallo and produced by Venevisión in 1980.

Flor Núñez and José Bardina as the main protagonists.

== Plot ==
Isabel is the kind of secretary every executive dreams of: she is efficient, intelligent, hard working and reliable. But as a woman, she leaves much to be desired, as she is drab and insignificant. She has developed a shyness that was formed due to the influence of Lucrecia, her dominant and overprotective mother. Lucrecia is a religious fanatic that has made her daughter grow up with low self-esteem and a lack of interest in making herself attractive to men. Jose Manuel, Isabel's boss, is a handsome businessman who sees Isabel merely as an employee. Jose Manuel is a widower who has raised his daughter Maria Jesús with the help of his mother-in-law who is not impressed that he has already begun to forget her daughter's memory by seeking other women, and she is forced to endure the presence of Ligia, Jose Manuel's frivolous girlfriend. Isabel has feelings for Jose Manuel, but she cannot dare tell him about them.

Jose Manuel seems to be happy with Ligia, but what he doesn't know is that Ligia is bored with their relationship, and she cheats on him with her best friend's boyfriend. Jose Manuel soon discovers this deception, and devastated, he falls into depression. Ligia and her lover flee the city for fear of Jose Manuel's retaliation over the betrayal. In his sadness, Isabel tries her best to comfort Jose Manuel, and it is then that he begins to see the goodness and sweet nature of Isabel's heart, the secretary that he merely greeted every day with "Good morning, Isabel". But Jose Manuel makes the wrong decision and proposes to Isabel, not because he loves her but out of desperation, in an attempt to forget Ligia.

The two finally get married, but the next day, Jose Manuel regrets his decision. Heartbroken, Isabel flees his cruel treatment and goes in search of his mother. But the experience has turned Isabel into a strong young woman and not the shy, weak secretary. Seeing that she cannot be able to control Isabel any longer, Doña Lucrecia falls ill and dies. Through a friend's recommendation, Isabel travels out of the country. Meanwhile, Jose Manuel realizes that his secretary meant more to him than he wanted to admit, but seeing that Isabel isn't around, he decides to wait for his wife. Ligia comes back with an attempt to win Jose Manuel back, but she is only faced by rejection. When Isabel comes back, everyone is shocked to see her transformed into a well groomed, beautiful woman

== Cast ==
- Flor Núñez as Isabel
- José Bardina asJose Manuel
- Diego Acuña
- Enrique Alzugaray as Chendo
- Mario Brito
- Luis Colmenares as Benjamin
- Renee de Pallas as Zoilq
- Chela D'Gar
- Miguel David Díaz
- Alexis Escamez
- Elisa Escámez
- Elba Escobar
- Manuel Escolano
- Juan Frankis as Domingo
- Yalitza Hernández as Maria Jesus
- Pierangeli Llinas
- Félix Loreto
- Esperanza Magaz as Coromoto
- Dalia Marino
- Herminia Martínez as Ligia
- Eva Moreno
- Miriam Ochoa as Fernanda
- Carmencita Padrón as Nati
- Tony Rodríguez as Efrain
- Augusto Romero as Eduardito
- Chumico Romero
- Betty Ruth as Lucrecia
- Egnis Santos
- Franklin Virgüez as Marcelo
