= Ana Karina Manco =

Venezuelan actress

- Born: Ana Karina Manco Guzmán; December 17, 1967 (age 58); Caracas, Venezuela
- Occupation: Actress
- Spouse: Vicente Perez Recao (2002-present)
- Children: Dimitri Nicolás; Alexa

Ana Karina Manco Guzmán (born 17 December 1967) is a Venezuelan actress known for her various roles in telenovelas and theatre.

== Biography ==
Ana is the youngest of three older siblings, her sister Giannina and brothers Frollo and Freddy. She graduated from Law School at the Universidad Santa María.

She began her acting career at the age of 13 by landing a role as the co-protagonist in the RCTV telenovela La mujer sin rostro.

In 2010, she returned to telenovelas to play the villain in the telenovela La mujer perfecta written by Leonardo Padrón

== Personal life ==
On 23 May 2002, Manco married businessman Vicente Perez Recao. They received their first son Dimitri Nicolás. In 2012, the actress announced via Twitter that she was expecting a second child. On April 2, 2013, Ana gave birth to her second child, a daughter named Alexa Model Agency Mariela Centeno

== Filmography ==
=== Telenovelas ===
- La mujer perfecta (2010) as Gala Moncada Montiel de Reveron
- Aunque mal paguen (2007) as Catalina Quiroz
- Sabor a ti (2004) as Miranda Valladares
- Amantes de Luna Llena (2001) as La Chocolate
- El País de las mujeres (1998) as Mariana Campos Gómez
- Contra Viento y Marea (1997) as Daniela Borges
- Sol de Tentación (1996) as Sandra Nionegro
- Amores de Fin de Siglo (1995) as Constanza
- El Desprecio (1991) as Tamara Campos
- Por Estas Calles
- Carmen querida as Carolina Arcaya
- La mujer sin rostro

=== Theater ===
- La Fierecilla Domada
- María Lionza
- La Mozuela
