= Gabriela Spanic =

Venezuelan actress and singer

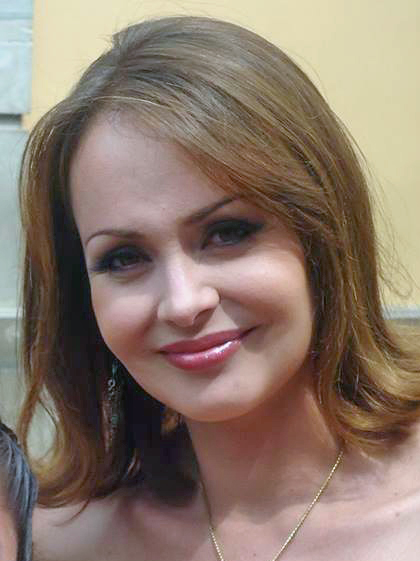
- Spanic in 2013
- Born: Gabriela Elena Španić Utrera; December 10, 1973 (age 52); Ortiz, Guárico, Venezuela
- Other name: Gaby Spanic
- Occupations: Actress; model; singer
- Years active: 1986–present
- Spouse: Miguel de Léon (m. 1996; div. 2003)
- Children: 1
- Relatives: Daniela Spanic (twin sister)

Gabriela Elena Španić Utrera (Spanish pronunciation: [gaˈβɾjela ʃpaˈnitʃ]; born December 10, 1973), known simply as Gabriela Spanic or Gaby Spanic (locally [(e)spaˈnik]), is a Venezuelan actress, model, singer and beauty pageant titleholder. She is known for her roles in several Latin telenovelas, most notably her portrayal of twins in La usurpadora (1998), one of the most popular telenovelas in the Spanish-speaking world.

Spanic has been signed to Televisa, Telemundo, TV Azteca, and Venevision.

== Early life ==
Gabriela was born in Ortiz, to Croatian father Casimiro Spanic and Venezuelan mother Norma Utrera. She has a twin sister, Daniela Spanic, one younger sister, Patricia, and a younger brother, Antonio. She studied Psychology in Caracas at Andrés Bello Catholic University for a year but left university to pursue an acting career.

== Career ==
Spanic's career started in 1992 when she joined the Miss Venezuela 1992 contest, representing her home state, Guárico, The contest served as a platform to launch her acting career even though it was won by Milka Chulina it led to appearances in Venezuelan telenovelas such as Morena Clara, where she portrayed the villain Linda Prado.

In 1994, Spanic had her first leading role in the telenovela Como Tu Ninguna, which aired for two years and became one of the largest novelas of the country and had an enormous success, including internationally.

After playing Amaranta in Todo por tu Amor (1997), Spanic moved to Mexico, where she acted in La usurpadora (1998), portraying twins Paola and Paulina, which came to worldwide success when the novela was transmitted to more than 125 countries around the world and became one of the most popular telenovelas in the Spanish-speaking world. La Usurpadora was the first novela to win more than 20 points in the grid of the TV American audience.

In 2000 Gabriela Spanic co-hosted the OTI Festival in its last edition, which was held in Acapulco.

Spanic acted in other Televisa productions such as Por Tu Amor (1999), and La intrusa (2001), before signing with Telemundo, starring in La venganza (2002), Prisionera (2004) and Tierra de pasiones (2006).

Spanic won the Orquidea Award in 2005 for her trajectory as an actress, as well as the prestigious FAMAS Award for Best Actress for her role in Tierra de Pasiones.

In 2010, Spanic worked with Televisa again when she played the antagonist of Soy tu Dueña. As of 2011, Spanic is signed to TV Azteca, and has worked in Emperatriz (2011), La otra cara del alma (2012) and Siempre tuya Acapulco (2014).

== Personal life ==
Spanic was married to actor Miguel de León from 1996 to 2003. She and her ex-boyfriend have one son born in 2008.

In 2025, Spanic moved to Brazil.

== Filmography ==
Television, television films and series
Year	Title	Role	Notes
1989	La fuerza de los humildes	Unknown	
1990	Adorable Mónica	Rute	
1991	Mundo de fieras	Unknown	
1991-1992	Bellísima	Unknown	
1992	La loba herida	Meche	
1992	Divina obsesión	Aurora	
1993	Rosangélica	Carla	
1993	Morena Clara	Linda Prado	Series regular
1994	Maria Celeste	Celina Hidalgo	Guest star
1994-1995	Como tú, ninguna	Gilda Barreto/Raquel Sandoval	Main role
1996	Quirpa de tres mujeres	Emiliana Echeverría Salazar Castañon	Main role
1997	Todo por tu amor	Petra Josefina Marcano / Amaranta Rey	Series regular
1997	Bienvenidos	Esterbina	Guest star
1998	La usurpadora	Paola Bracho Montaner / Paulina Bracho Martinez	Main role
1998	Más allá de la usurpadora	Paulina Bracho Martinez	Television film
1999	Por tu amor	Aurora de Montalvo / María del Cielo Montalvo de Durán	Main role
2001	La hora pico	Herself	Guest star
2001	La intrusa	Virginia Martínez Roldán de Junquera Brito/Vanessa Martínez Roldàn de Islas	Main role
2002-2003	La venganza	Valentina Díaz / Helena Valerugo Fontana	Main role
2004	Prisionera	Guadalupe Santos Luján	Main role
2004	Numai Iubirea		Guest star
2005–07	Decisiones	Daniela / Mariela	2 episodes
2006	Tierra de pasiones	Valeria San Román	Main role
2010	Soy tu dueña	Ivana Dorantes Rangel	Series regular
2011	Emperatriz	Emperatriz Jurado	Main role
2011	Confesiones de novelas	Herself	
2012	Soy tu doble	Herself	Judge
2012-2013	La otra cara del alma	Alma Hernández Quijano	Main role
2013	Te quiero mexico, te quiero limpio	Driver	
2014	Siempre tuya Acapulco	Fiscal Fernanda Montenegro	Guest star
2015	Baila si puedes	Herself	Participant/guest
2018	Heredadas	Alma	
2019	Más noche	Herself	
2019	Teletón Dynamic What is the mask?	Herself	Participant
2020	Dancing with the Stars Hungary	Herself	Participant
2021	Si nos dejan	Fedora Montelongo	Series regular
2021	La casa de los famosos	Herself	Participant
2021	Esta historia me suena	Rosario	Episode: "Te aprovechas de mí"
2022	Corazón guerrero	Elisa	Series regular
2022	La mejor navidad		Main role
2022–24	Secretos de villanas	Herself	Main cast
2023	Top Chef VIP	Herself	Participant
2023	Amores que engañan	Elisa	Episode: "Talento robado"
2023	La Usurpadora: The Musical		Film
2024	Vivir de amor	Mónica Rivero Cuéllar	Series regular
2025	A Fazenda	Herself	Contestant

== Discography ==
- Gabriela Total (2004)
- Mejorando Tu Vida Con Gabriela Spanic, Vol. 1 e 2 (2005)
- En Carne Viva (2014)
- Gabriela Spanic Greatest Hits (2016)
