= Sol de tentación =

Television series

- Genre: Telenovela; Romance; Drama
- Created by: Vivel Nouel
- Written by: Elizabeth Alezard; Perla Farías; María Antonieta Gutiérrez; Óscar Urdaneta
- Directed by: Rafael Gómez; Arquímedes Rivero
- Starring: Natalia Streignard; Miguel de León; Adolfo Cubas; Aroldo Betancourt; Ana Karina Manco
- Opening theme: "La Llamada del Amor" by Jose Luis Rodriguez
- Country of origin: Venezuela
- Original language: Spanish
- No. of episodes: 168

Production
- Executive producer: Henry Ramos
- Producer: Sandra Rioboo
- Production company: Venevisión

Original release
- Network: Venevisión
- Release: July 17, 1996 – January 21, 1997

Related
- Quirpa de Tres Mujeres; Todo por tu amor

Sol de tentación is a Venezuelan telenovela written by Vivel Nouel and produced by Venevisión in 1996. This telenovela lasted 168 episodes and was distributed internationally by Venevisión International.

On July 17, 1996, Venevisión started broadcasting Sol de tentación weekdays at 9:00pm, replacing Quirpa de tres mujeres. The last episode was broadcast on January 21, 1997, with Todo por tu amor replacing it the following day.

Natalia Streignard and Miguel de León starred as the main protagonists with Adolfo Cubas, Ana Karina Manco and Maria Fabiola Colmenares as the main antagonists.

== Synopsis ==
Sol is a poor young girl who lives with her father, Hipolito Romero, on an old ship anchored close to the shore of a small coastal town. Fishing and sailing are her passions, and the sea is her home. When she was a small child, her mother abandoned her to run away with a wealthy tourist. Sol and her father, however, believe that her brother drowned in the ocean that they love so much. Armando de la Torre is handsome, rich and lives in the capital city. He is on vacation on his family's yacht with a group of friends and his arrogant fiancée: Martita Aristigueta. A boating accident initially brings Armando and Sol together, lighting the spark of love. Later, at a street festival in town, they meet again and, consumed by an irresistible attraction, they begin a passionate love affair. Martita, crazy with jealousy, sets out to do everything in her power to destroy Sol and Armando's happiness. Resorting to lies and intrigue, she manages to make Armando distrust Sol and put an end to their relationship. A disillusioned Armando marries Martita; Sol, feeling abandoned and desperate, decides to marry Rildo, a former suitor, in spite of the fact that she is expecting Armando's baby. Fifteen years later, destiny places Sol in the path of her former lover, Armando. Now, they are both filled with anguish upon learning that their respective children have fallen in love with each other. Only the strongest, truest love will be able to reunite Sol and Armando, allowing them to make up for lost time. Meanwhile, their children, Atlanta and Alejandro, are more in love every day... and will fight all impediments in the way of their final happiness.

== Cast ==
- Natalia Streignard as Sol Romero
- Miguel de León as Jose Armando Santalucia
- Aroldo Betancourt as Rildo Castillo. Villain, later good.
- Ana Karina Manco as Sandra Rionegro. Villain, killed by Marta.
- Julio Pereira as Daniel Romero & Moises Irrazabal
- Maria Fabiola Colmenares as Marta Irrazabal Main female villain. Killed by Emilio.
- Jorge Palacios as Rogelio Santalucia
- Adolfo Cubas as Emilio Berdugo Main male villain. Responsible for death of Arturo, Esther and Marta. Killed by Marta.
- Mauricio González as Hipolito Romero
- Jennifer Rodriguez as Alina
- Vangie Labalan as Fabiola Castilla
- Jonathan Montenegro as Luis Alejandro Romero
- Albi de Abreu as Ezequiel
- Virginia Garcia as Estrella Maria
- Fedra Lopez as Katiuska
- Marita Capote as Monica de Romero
- Rosita Vásquez as Casta
- Laura Cerra as María Monitos
- Cristina Obin as Lourdes Santalucia
- José Torres as Casimiro
- Rita de Gois as Esther de Irrazabal
- Rodolfo Drago as Arturo Irrazabal. Villain. Killed by Emilio.
- Eliseo Perera as Toribio
- Julio Capote as Padre Felicio
- Yanis Chimaras as Gonzalo Santalucia
- Patricia Oliveros as Irene Santalucia
- Francisco Ferrari as Francisco
- Deyanira Hernández as Alysson
- Jhonny Zapata as Reinaldo
- Antonio Machuca as Mercurio
- Adelaida Mora as Gabriela Dominguez
- Jenny Valdez as Mirna
- Wilmer Machado as Guallallo
- Asdrubal Blanco as Antonio Garcia-Quinto
- Jose Vieira as Dr. Enrique Ramos Urdaneta
- Niurka Acevedo as Rubi
- Nancy Gonzalez as Salome de Rionegro. Villain.
- Ana Massimo as Carla
- Ivette Dominguez as Jade
