= Marielena =

1992 telenovela

- Genre: Telenovela; Drama
- Created by: Delia Fiallo
- Written by: Tabare Perez; Delia Fiallo; Isa Moreno
- Directed by: Rodolfo Hoppe; Andrei Zincã; Cusi Barrio
- Country of origin: United States
- Original language: Spanish
- No. of episodes: 229

Production
- Producer: José Enrique Crousillat

Original release
- Network: Telemundo
- Release: 1992

Marielena is a Spanish-language telenovela written by Delia Fiallo. It premiered on Telemundo in 1992, and starred Lucía Méndez and Eduardo Yáñez. The telenovela was originally aired in a few dozen countries around the world.

== Premise ==
The story begins with a woman named Carmela Muñoz giving birth to a girl named Marielena in the middle of the Florida Straits while escaping Cuba in a boat. Years later, Marielena is a beautiful young woman living in Miami with her mother and siblings, Enrique, Jr. a.k.a. "Kike", Mercedes a.k.a. "Meche" and Yolanda a.k.a. "Yoly". Marielena is engaged to a young man named Javier. Yoly is married to a man named Alfredo Minelli a.k.a. Fredy, whose father Rufino works at a restaurant serenading guests, and Meche is the girlfriend of Javier's brother, Leon. Leon and Javier live with their parents Fucha and Teo close to Carmela's home. One day while walking back home after buying flowers, Marielena is hit by a red convertible. A handsome young man named Luis Felipe Sandoval steps out of the car and offers her money for the flowers but speeds away angrily when she asks only for an apology.

== Production notes ==
The telenovela was filmed and produced in Miami, Florida and was also recorded during Hurricane Andrew. Luis Oquendo died during filming after he suffered a heart attack.

== Cast ==
- Lucía Méndez as Marielena Muñoz
- Eduardo Yáñez as Luís Felipe Sandoval
- Zully Montero as Claudia Sandoval
- Maria José Alfonso as Carmela Muñoz
- Salvador Pineda as Esteban Serrano
- Mara Croatto as Graciela Serrano
- Julio Alcázar as Andrés Peñaranda
- Griselda Nogueras as Fucha
- Manolo Villaverde as Teo
- Martha Picanes as Olga Brusual
- German Barrios as Nicanor Garcia Negrete [dead]*(shot by Roberto)
- Aurora Callazo as Leticia Peñaranda
- Marta Velasco as Telma Socaras
- Rosa Felipe as Rosalia Socaras
- Sandra Haydee as Esperanza
- Miguel J. Gutiérrez as Rufino Minelli [dead]*
- Luis Oquendo as Urbano Gonzalez
- Miguel Paneke as León
- Maribel Gonzalez as Reina
- Juan Carlos Antón as Javier
- Maria Canals as Nancy
- Xavier Coronel as Alfredo "Fredy" Minelli [dead]*
- Emiliano Díez as Rene
- Ivon D'Liz as Purita
- Frank Falcon as Enrique "Kike" Muñoz
- Cristina Karman as Yolanda "Yoly" Muñoz
- Alexa Kuve as Melissa Peñaranda
- Luz Marabel as Zuleima
- Abrahm Méndez as Tato
- Isaura Mendoza as Maria
- Caridad Ravelo as Chela
- Bertha Sandoval as Enriqueta Gonzalez
- Eva Tamargo as Cecilia
- Anardis Vega as Nicanor "Nikky" Garcia Negrete, Jr.
- Mayte Vilán as Mercedes "Meche" Muñoz
- Larry Villanueva as Andrés "Andy" Peñaranda, Jr. [dead]*
- Salvador Levy as Urbano (replaced Luis Oquendo after he died)
