= Caribe (Venezuelan TV series) =

- Genre: Telenovela
- Created by: Mariela Romero
- Directed by: Ibrahím Guerra; Reinaldo Lancaster
- Starring: Carolina Perpetuo Miguel de León
- Opening theme: Robando Azules by Yordano
- Country of origin: Venezuela
- Original language: Spanish
- No. of episodes: 176

Production
- Executive producer: Genaro Escobar
- Producer: Carlos Bolivar
- Production company: RCTV

Original release
- Network: RCTV
- Release: September 10, 1990 – February 2, 1991

Caribe is a Venezuelan telenovela written by Mariela Romero and produced by Radio Caracas Televisión in 1990. This telenovela lasted 176 episodes and was distributed internationally by RCTV International.

Carolina Perpetuo, Jaime Araque and Miguel de León starred as the main protagonists.

== Synopsis ==
The small island of Caribe is located in the Atlantic Ocean. Its inhabitants are hardworking, gentle people that have been victims of the avarice and cruelty of its rulers - Eleazar and Margot Bustamante. Some thirty years ago, they committed a terrible crime for which they ultimately will pay heavily. This is a story of a beautiful country, its struggle for sovereignty and a woman's passion for life and love.

Manolita Contreras, an aspiring writer, becomes dramatically conscious of life in Caribe - surrounded by adversaries. Luis Alfredo Alfonso, a young aristocrat, gives Manolita the strength and support she needs. Their love is so strong that together they can face everything.

Caribe is passionate, mysterious, intriguing, and packed with conflict. It is a fictional place filled with the realities of life...the harbor of dreams and the magic of love.

== Cast ==
- Carolina Perpetuo as Manuela Contreras
- Jaime Araque as Lorenzo
- Miguel de León as Luis Alfredo
- Carlos Cámara Jr. as Roberto Castell
- Marcos Campos as Angel Molina
- Héctor Mayerston as Eleazar Bustamante
- Dora Mazzone as Aminta
- Miriam Ochoa as Margot
- Francis Romero as Elvira Contreras
- Ileanna Simancas as Maria Eugenia
- Elisa Stella as Matilda
- Rosita Vasquez as Valeria
