= Caterina Valentino =

Venezuelan radio and television host, actress and model

CATERINA VALENTINO
- Caterina Valentino Paladino
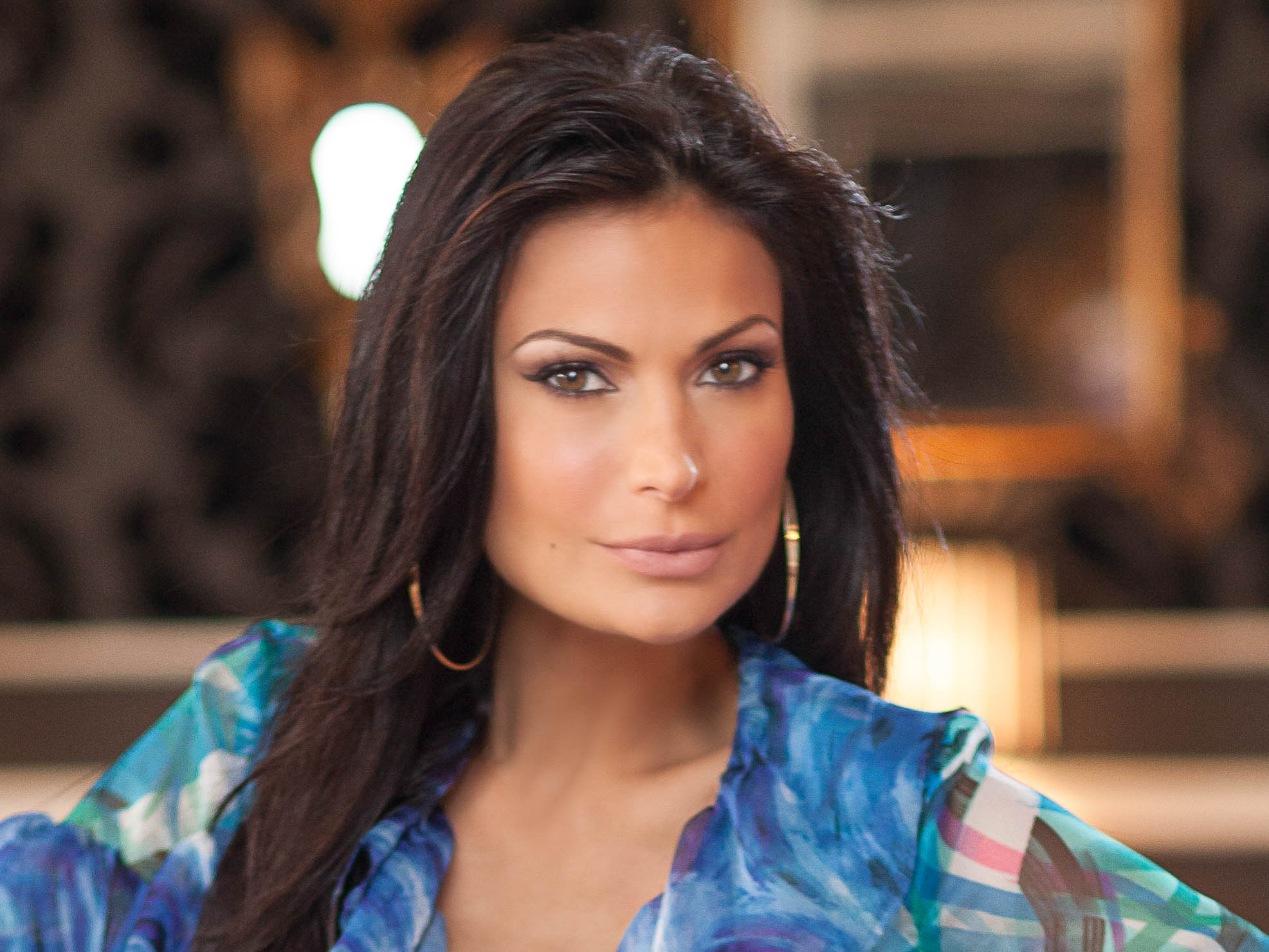
- Born: February 9, 1976 (age 50); Caracas, Venezuela
- Citizenship: Venezuelan, Italian
- Education: Andrés Bello Catholic University, Central University of Venezuela
- Occupations: Journalist, Radio and Television Presenter, Model, Entrepreneur
- Years active: 1995–present
- Employer: RCTV. Venevisión. Televen. NBC Universal. Antena 3. Circuito Unión Radio. Circuito FM Center. Caracol Radio. W Radio.
- Organization: Los Buenos Somos Más
- Television: Planeta Sur. Súper Sábado Sensacional. ¡Qué locura! Miss V El Maquillaje Perfecto. Sudando La Gota Gorda. Amor Secreto. ¿Hay Corazón?. E! VIP Caracas. Zona Trendy Caracas. Espejo Público.
- Honours: Condecorada por el Gobierno de Italia con la ordine Stella D'Italia. Cavaliere. Año 2019.
- Website: caterinavalentino.com

Caterina Valentino Paladino (born in Caracas, Venezuela on February 9, 1976) is a Venezuelan-Italian journalist, television presenter, announcer, writer, actress, model and businesswoman. She is one of the most recognized and important figures in Venezuela and has won many awards for her professional work.

For more than 28 years, she has been part of the FM Center Circuit, the largest private radio station in Venezuela, where she served as a newscaster for the information space FM Center es Noticia, and now as an image, official voice and attached consultant. In addition, she is the presenter of her own program.

== Biography ==
Valentino grew up in the Caracas neighborhood of Catia, the daughter of Italian immigrants. She studied Computer Engineering at the Metropolitan University, which she abandoned to dedicate herself to Journalism. She graduated from the Andrés Bello Catholic University in 2000.

She began her professional career at Puma TV, a Venezuelan UHF channel dedicated to promoting music videos, owned by singer José Luis Rodríguez. In 1997, she went on to Radio Caracas Televisión, where she presented, along with Kike Vallés, a youth version of the nature-adventure program Expedición, called Planeta Sur. At the same time, Valentino joined FM Center network to host Contigo..., a program that was originally broadcast at weekends.

Valentino joined Venevisión in 2007 to host the reality show Sudando La Gota Gorda, a local adaptation of The Biggest Loser format. After three seasons on the air, in 2010, she went on to present another reality competition program, Who is the better dancer?, with Hony Estrella and which was broadcast simultaneously on Venevisión in Venezuela and on Telesistema 11 in the Dominican Republic.

In 2010, she also joined E! Entertainment Television, as host of the E! VIP Caracas, a space that showed the nightlife in the Venezuelan capital, as well as interviews with local celebrities. She has hosted red carpet events and Fashion Week events in Aruba and Madrid, among others.

Valentino switched to Televen in 2012 to host ¿Hay Corazón?, a local adaptation of 12 Corazones, produced by Telemundo. On July 30, 2012, Televen removed the program from its regular schedule at 7:00 p.m., after a notification from Conatel, the Venezuelan telecommunications regulatory body, about its content. The program returned in October of the same year with a version suitable for all audiences, but on April 23, 2013, Conatel, following an order from the then Minister of Communication and Information, Ernesto Villegas, initiated an administrative sanction procedure against the channel, and permanently closing the program.

In 2013, Valentino published her autobiography titled Valiente Corazón (Brave Heart). In the book, Valentino reveals that she was victim of sexual abuse during her childhood by one of her music teachers. She has also been a columnist for the newspaper El Nacional and the Venezuelan website Caraota Digital.

In 2014, her program on E! It was renamed Zona Trendy Caracas. On March 31, 2016, through her Instagram account, Valentino announced the departure of the program from the air due to safety concerns in Venezuela. "My team from Zona Trendy Caracas -a program broadcast by E! -, were attacked by crime on several occasions. In the last recordings we had to go out with bodyguards, for the safety of everyone and the technical staff. Everything became complicated."

Valentino made her soap opera debut in Amor Secreto, by Venevisión, in 2015. She played Rebeca Villegas de Ferrándiz, one of the villains in history. She landed the role after Christina Dieckmann retired from production alleging personal issues.

Since 2012, Valentino has been a correspondent for Caracol Internacional for Venezuela. In addition, in 2018 she joined Antena 3 as a correspondent in Caracas. For her journalistic work, she was awarded the Order of Dignity and Homeland by the Colombian Congress in 2017. In 2019, she was awarded by the Government of Italy with the Ordine Stella D'Italia Cavaliere, in recognition of her work as a journalist, and for strengthening the cultural ties between Italy and Venezuela.

== Awards and recognitions ==
- Awarded by the Government of Italy with the Stella d'Italia Cavaliere in 2019, in recognition of her work as a journalist and figure in the entertainment medium and for strengthening cultural ties between Italy and Venezuela.
- Awarded by the Congress of the Republic of Colombia with the order of "Dignity and Homeland in Degree of Commitment in 2017", in recognition of her 20 years of professional work in Venezuela and 8 years as a correspondent in Colombia.
- Certificate of Recognition "Artistic Merit & Distinction" by Miami Dade, Councilman Christian Cevallos, 2023.
- Recognized by the Mayor of the city of Doral Miami, United States for her humanitarian work with her Foundation "Los Buenos Somos Más", 2017.
- Honorary Citizen of the city of San Chirico Raparo. Basilicata. Italy.
- Awarded as an Example of a Woman, within the framework of the International Women's Month by the Mayor's Office of the Municipality El Hatillo.
- Recognized for the work of providing truthful and timely information to the Venezuelan people, by the Commission of Popular Power and Media of the National Assembly of Venezuela, 2018.
- Awarded for her outstanding work as a Journalist by the Municipal Council of the Mayor's Office of Baruta with the Renny Ottolina Order, 2018.
- Decorated as an Example of a Woman, within the framework of International Women's Day by the Mayor's Office of Baruta
- Decorated for her work as a Social Communicator by the Miranda State Government, in Venezuela with the Francisco de Miranda Order, 2017.
- Awarded for her work as a communication professional, with the highest distinction granted by the Mayor's Office of Chacao.
- Awarded for her journalistic work, with the Cecilio Acosta Order granted by the Mayor of Sucre.
- Recognition for Journalist's Day granted by the Mayor's Office of Municipio El Hatillo.
- Mara de Platino Internacional 2017 as Venezuelan Personality with International Projection.
- Mara de Oro Internacional 2017 as a Venezuelan Journalist with Great Projection in Latin American.
- Recognized with the Latin American Excellence Awards as one of the Ambassadors of Aruba by Aruba.com in 2016, for her work as a journalist and influender of the Island of Aruba in 2016.
- Anthony de Oro Internacional 2010 as Presenter of the Year
- Mara de Oro Internacional 2009 as Radio Host of the Year.
- International Gold Cacique Distinction 2008 Presenter of the Year.
- Awarded the Order of Citizen Excellence 2007 in Caracas.
- Mara de Oro Internacional 2006 as Radio Host of the Year.
