= Sabor a ti =

- Genre: Telenovela
- Created by: Ligia Lezama; Benilde Avila
- Written by: Ligia Lezama; Benilde Avila; Abigail Truchess; Manuel Mendoza
- Directed by: Carlos Izquierdo
- Creative director: Arquímedes Rivero
- Starring: Ana Karina Manco; Miguel de León; Astrid Carolina Herrera; Guillermo Pérez; Juan Carlos Vivas
- Theme music composer: Roque Valero
- Opening theme: "Vengo a contrar contigo" by Roque Valero
- Country of origin: Venezuela
- Original language: Spanish
- No. of episodes: 153

Production
- Executive producer: Sandra Rioboó
- Producers: Alejandro León; Isabel de Acevedo
- Production location: Caracas
- Running time: 41-44 minutes
- Production company: Venevisión International

Original release
- Network: Venevisión
- Release: August 24, 2004 – February 15, 2005

Related
- Cosita rica; El amor las vuelve locas

Sabor a ti is a Venezuelan telenovela written by Ligia Lezama and Benilde Avila which was produced by Venevisión between 2004 and 2005. The series was distributed internationally by Venevisión International.

Ana Karina Manco and Miguel de León starred as the main protagonists while Astrid Carolina Herrera, Guillermo Pérez and Julio Alcázar starred as the antagonists.

== Plot ==
Leonardo Lombardi (Miguel de León) is a successful engineer who returns from a business trip only to find his beloved wife Raiza (Astrid Carolina Herrera) in bed with his best friend Federico (Juan Carlos Vivas). This breaks Leonardo's heart, making him become a bitter man who is distrustful of women.

Meanwhile, Miranda (Ana Karina Manco) is a medical student who is forced to give up her medical pediatrician studies in order to help out her family which is experiencing economic problems, to the point that they are about to be evicted from the building where they live. It is through this way that she meets Leonardo, whose wealthy family owns the building where Miranda lives. Leonardo offers Miranda a job in his house as the caretaker of his two children and ailing grandfather.

Life for Miranda at the Lombardi mansion becomes difficult as she has to deal with Leonardo's bitterness, his sister-in-law's Fabiana's cruelty toward's her, and the insults of Raiza, who returns to her matrimonial home to manipulate Leonardo by using their daughter's emotional problems in order to try and win him back. The only support and care she receives while in the mansion are from Salvador, Leonardo's grandfather and his two children, Carlitos and Karina. After a while, Leonardo begins to fall in love with Miranda after seeing her sweet, caring nature. However, in order for them to be happy, they will have to face the wrath of Raiza who sees Miranda as an obstacle to regaining her previous former happiness.

== Cast ==
=== Main ===
- Ana Karina Manco as Miranda Valladares
- Miguel de León as Leonardo Lombardi
- Astrid Carolina Herrera as Raiza Alarcón de Lombardi
- Guillermo Pérez as Darío Antonetti
- Juan Carlos Vivas as Federico Carvajal
- Gigi Zanchetta as Sonia Fernández
- Rafael Romero as José "Cheo" Pacheco
- Adrián Delgado as Manolo Martínez
- Eduardo Luna as Germán Estévez
- Eva Blanco as Elva "Elvita" Montiel Vda. de Valladares
- Julio Alcázar as Raimundo Lombardi

=== Also main ===
- Sonia Villamizar as Fabiana Alarcón
- Veronica Ortiz as Yajaira Martínez
- Kassandra Tepper as Claudia
- Milena Santander as Chela
- Reina Hinojosa as Eloísa Lombardi
- Patricia Schwarzgruber as Victoria Valladares "Vicky"
- Bebsabe Duque as Ginette Alarcón
- Claudia La Gatta as Cherryl
- Umberto Buonocuore as Salvador Lombardi
- Gerardo Soto as Alejandro Ferrer
- Amilcar Rivero as Gregory
- Francisco Ferrari as Padre Agustín
- Rosalinda Serfaty as Andreína
- Reinaldo José Pérez as Pedro García
- Erika Schwarzgruber as Rina Lombardi
- Pamela Djalil as Pamela
- Lance Dos Ramos as Saúl Lombardi
- Milena Torres as Corina
- Michelle Naseff as Karina Lombardi Alarcón
- Alejandro Rodríguez as Carlos "Carlitos" Lombardi Alarcón
