= Miss Earth Venezuela 2005 =

1st Miss Earth Venezuela pageant

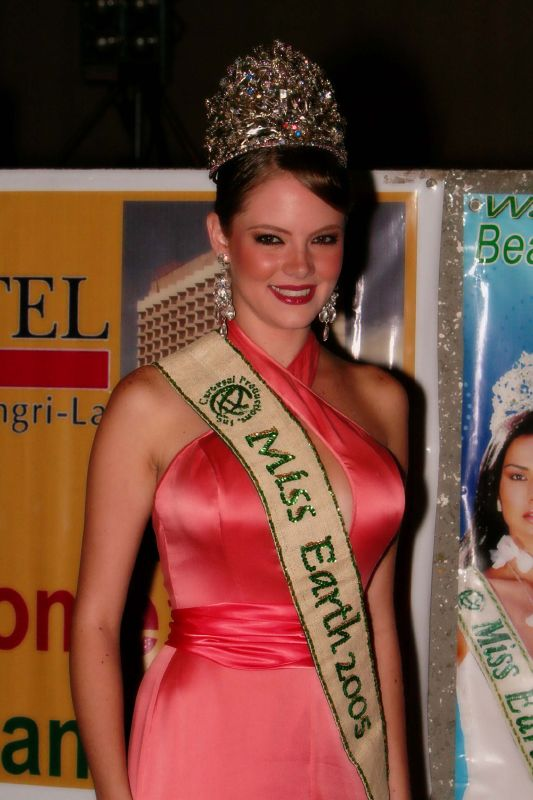
- Date: June 1, 2005
- Presenters: Daniela Kosán
- Venue: Hard Rock Cafe, Caracas, Venezuela
- Broadcaster: La Tele
- Entrants: 15
- Placements: 5
- Winner: Alexandra Braun; Caracas

Miss Earth Venezuela 2005 (Spanish: Miss Sambil Models Venezuela 2005) was the inaugural Miss Earth Venezuela pageant. It was held at the Hard Rock Cafe in Caracas, Venezuela on June 1, 2005.

At the end of the event, María Julia Álvarez crowned Alexandra Braun of Caracas as Miss Earth Venezuela 2005. She represented Venezuela at the Miss Earth 2005 where she won the first crown for the country. She also won the special prize Best in Swimsuit.

== Background ==
Since 2001, Venezuelan representatives to Miss Earth were appointed by independent franchisors. Miss Earth Venezuela title was first given by Sambil Model Organization in 2005.

== Pageant ==
=== Selection committee ===
The judges for Miss Earth Venezuela included:

- Ruddy Rodríguez – Actress, Miss World Venezuela 1985 and third runner-up at Miss World 1985
- Raquel Lares – TV host, Miss Sucre 1986, and fifth runner-up at Miss Venezuela 1986
- Guillermo González – TV host
- Ángel Álvarez – Artistic representative
- Andrés Galarraga – MLB baseball player
- Édgar Ramírez – Actor
- Eva Ekvall – Journalist, Miss Venezuela 2000 and third runner-up at Miss Universe 2001
- Giovanni Scutaro – Fashion designer
- Luigi Ratino – Artistic representative
- Deive Garcés – Model, Mister Carabobo 2000 and top 10 at Mister Venezuela 2000

== Results ==
=== Placements ===
Color key

- Declared as winner
- Ended as runner-up
- Ended as top 5/8 qualification
- Ended as one of the finalists or semifinalists
- Ended as special awards winner

Placement	Contestant	International Placement
Sambil Models Venezuela 2005 (Miss Earth Venezuela 2005	Alexandra Braun	Miss Earth 2005
1st runner-up	Shannon de Lima	
2nd runner-up	María Escalante	
3rd runner-up	Myriam Abreu	
4th runner-up	Susana Girardi	

=== Special awards ===
Award	Contestant
Chica La Tele	Alexandra Braun
Miss Internet	Alexandra Braun
Miss Press	Alexandra Braun
Miss Popularity	Stephanie Salazar
Best Body	María Escalante
Best Legs	Dayana Domínguez
Most Beautiful Eyes	Susana Girardi
Most Beautiful Face	Natalia Barrantes
Most Beautiful Hair	Leonela Castro

== Contestants ==
15 contestants competed for the title.

No.	Contestant
1	Johanna Vargas
2	Stephanie Salazar
3	Lorena Loera
4	Ana Mazzocca
5	Gabriela Carrascal
6	Susana Girardi
7	Daniela Angarita
8	Natalia Barrantes
9	Shannon de Lima
10	María Escalante
11	Dayana Domínguez
12	Leonela Castro
13	Myriam Abreu
14	Yogheisa Adrián
15	Alexandra Braun
