= Alejandra Sandoval =

Colombian actress (born 1980)

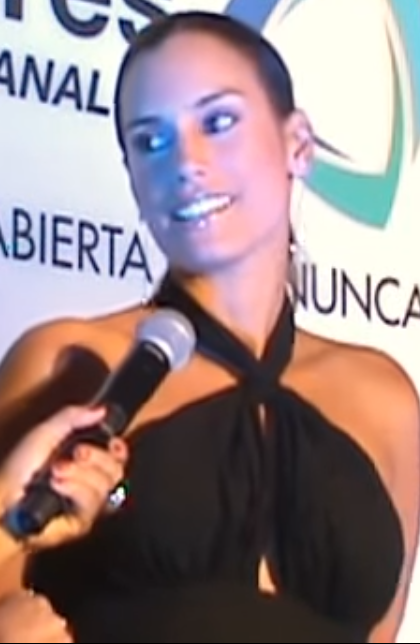
- Alejandra Sandoval
- Born: 23 August 1980 (age 46); Santiago de Cali, Valle del Cauca, Colombia
- Occupation: Actress
- Height: 1.65
- Spouse: Jorge Reyes (m. 2015)

Alejandra Sandoval (born 23 August 1980) is a Colombian actress.

== Biography ==
Alejandra was born in the city of Cali where she was raised by her single mother. After high school, she joined the Universidad de San Buenaventura to study psychology.

In 2014, she was cast as the protagonist of the upcoming telenovela Amor Secreto to be produced by Venevisión alongside Miguel de León.

== Personal life ==
Alejandra has a daughter named Valeria Sandoval.. In March 2015, Alejandra married her long-time boyfriend Jorge Reyes at a private ceremony held in Isla Margarita. In September 2015, the couple announced they were expecting their first child. Her oldest daughter got married in 2016 and her youngest daughter was already born

== Filmography ==
=== Films ===
Year	Title	Role	Notes
2012	Todas mías	Sandy	Debut film
2012	Amante de lo ajeno	Ana	
2013	Rosa de Baccara		Short film

=== Television ===
Year	Title	Role	Notes
2004	Luna, la heredera	Alicia	Recurring role
2005	Juegos prohibidos	Sandra Cubides	Recurring role
2007	Pura sangre	Lucía Velandia	Recurring role
2008-2009	Doña Bárbara	Genoveva Sandoval	Recurring role
2009	Verano en Venecia	Young Leticia Toledo	Recurring role
2009	Las muñecas de la mafia	Violeta	Recurring role
2010	Salvador de mujeres	Socorro	Recurring role
2011	Los herederos del Monte	Guadalupe Mardones	Recurring role
2012-2013	Dulce amargo	Sofía Hidalgo	Co-lead role
2015	Amor secreto	Irene Gutiérrez Vielma	Lead role
2017	El bienamado	Melissa	
