= La intrusa (2001 TV series) =

Telenovela

- Created by: Inés Rodena
- Written by: Carlos Romero
- Directed by: Beatriz Sheridan
- Starring: Gabriela Spanic; Arturo Peniche
- Theme music composer: Jorge Avendaño
- Opening theme: "Intrusa" by Emmanuel
- Country of origin: Mexico
- Original language: Spanish
- No. of episodes: 135

Production
- Executive producer: Ignacio Sada
- Cinematography: Ricardo Navarrete
- Editors: Alfredo Frutos Maza; Simón Castañón
- Running time: 41-44 minutes
- Production company: Televisa

Original release
- Network: Canal de las Estrellas
- Release: April 16 – October 19, 2001

Related
- Valentina (1975)

La Intrusa (International Title: The Outsider) is a Mexican telenovela produced by Ignacio Sada for Televisa in 2001. It is a remake of the Venezuela telenovela Valentina, produced in 1975. It stars Gabriela Spanic and Arturo Peniche

It was the second collaboration on-screen between Spanic, Andere, and Paleta, who three worked in La usurpadora (1998).

== Plot ==
Rodrigo Junquera, who is close to death after an illness, decides to ask the nanny of his young child, Virginia Martínez, to marry him so she can look after his children when he's gone.

Virginia is a noble, young woman who is in love with Rodrigo's eldest son, Carlos Alberto. After his death it is discovered that Virginia is Rodrigo's wife, the heir of all his wealth. Carlos Alberto, along with his siblings, then accuse her of being an ambitious woman who married Rodrigo in secret.

Virginia's ordeal begins because she not only has to deal with the contempt of Carlos Alberto, who is still in love with her, but with the rudeness of Rodrigo's oldest children: Junior, Raquel, and Violeta. With the love of Aldo and Memo, the little ones, it makes coping with the friction within the mansion a little better.

Meanwhile, in another part of the country, a young woman named Vanessa is dedicated to deceiving millionaires in order to get their fortune, eager to get out of the miserable life she leads. She is the twin sister of Virginia, who has distanced herself so that their relationship is almost nil.

Beset by debt, Vanessa one day travels to Mexico where she meets Carlos Alberto, with whom she falls in love. However, despite her being a physical clone of Virginia, he despises her for her rudeness and impudence and just appearing like Virginia.

Virginia and Carlos Alberto marry, but after a series of faintings and loss of vision, Virginia discovers she has an inoperable brain cancer. At the same time, the medical findings confirm that she is pregnant. She finds that bringing the baby into the world can hasten the time of her fatal outcome. Virginia, disregarding the doctor's advice, decides to go ahead with the pregnancy. Blind and with the tumor extending inevitably, Virginia manages to give birth to a beautiful girl; but she dies afterwards.

The news of the death of her sister and the birth of her niece reaches Vanessa, who decides to go to Mexico to avenge all the slights Virginia suffered and to take care of her niece.

== Cast ==
=== Main ===
- Gabriela Spanic portrays dual roles:
  - as Virginia Martínez Roldán
  - as Vanessa Martínez Roldán
- Arturo Peniche as Carlos Alberto Junquera Brito

=== Also main ===
- Chantal Andere as Raquel Junquera Brito
- Sergio Sendel as Danilo Roldán Limantour
- Karla Álvarez as Violeta Junquera Brito
- Laura Zapata as Maximiliana Limantour Bracho de Roldán
- Dominika Paleta as Anabella Roldán Limantour
- Guillermo García Cantú as Rodrigo "Junior" Junquera Brito / Rodrigo Rivadeneyra Vargas
- Silvia Manríquez as Elena Roldán de Martínez
- José María Torre as Aldo Junquera Brito
- Sherlyn as Maricruz Roldán Limantour
- Marlene Favela as Guadalupe "Lupita" Rojas
- Claudio Báez as Alirio de Jesús Roldán

=== Supporting ===
- Jan as Johnny
- Yessica Salazar as Tania Rivadeneyra Elías
- Carlos Curiel as Father Chema (#1)
- Esther Rinaldi as Edith
- Jorge De Silva as Raymundo
- Sharis Cid as Aracely Menchaca
- Mónica Dossetti as Lawyer Silvana Palacios
- Marco Uriel as Santiago Islas
- Alejandro Ruiz as Juvencio Menchaca
- Diana Golden as Zayda Jimenez
- Silvia Derbez as Sagrario Vargas (#1)
- Bárbara Gil as Sagrario Vargas (#2)
- Enrique Lizalde as Rodrigo Junquera / Hilario Santos (#1)
- Carlos Cámara as Rodrigo Junquera / Hilario Santos (#2)
- Roberto "Puck" Miranda as Arnulfo Castillo
- Uberto Bondoni as Humberto Nava
- Claudio Rojo as Joaquín Velarde
- Milagros Rueda as Diosa
- Julio Monterde as Dr. José "Pepe" Cartaya
- Sergio Villicana as Guillermo "Memo" Junquera Brito
- Sara Montes as Balbina
- Eduardo Liñán as Inspector Torres
- Carlos Torres as Father Chema (#2)

=== Guest stars ===
- Patricia Reyes Spíndola as Renata de Velarde
- Silvia Caos as Evelia
- Queta Lavat as Rosalía Bracho Viuda de Limantour
- Irma Lozano as Laura Elías de Rivadeneyra
- Gustavo Rojo as Víctor Rivadeneyra
- Juan Pablo Gamboa as Esteban Fernández
- Víctor Noriega as Dr. Eduardo del Bosque Iturbide
- Martha Roth as Norma Iturbide Viuda de del Bosque
- Lorenzo de Rodas as Dr. Adrián Colmenares

== Awards and nominations ==
Year	Award	Category	Recipient	Result
2002	El Heraldo de México Awards	Best Actor	Arturo Peniche	Nominated
2002	El Heraldo de México Awards	Female Revelation	Marlene Favela	Won
2003	INTE Awards	Young Talent of the Year	Sherlyn	Won
