= Suicide in B-flat =

Suicide in B♭
- Original language: English
- Written by: Sam Shepard
- Characters: Pianist; Pablo; Louis; Petrone; Laureen; Niles; Paullette
- Genre: Drama

Premiere
- Date: October 15, 1976
- Place: Yale Repertory Theater; New Haven, CT

Suicide in B♭ is a play by Sam Shepard.

== Production history ==
Suicide in B♭ was first produced at the Yale Repertory Theater in New Haven, CT, on October 15, 1976. The first West Coast production took place in 1977 at the Magic Theatre, San Francisco, directed by Robert Woodruff. The cast of the Yale Rep production was as follows:

- Pianist – Lawrence Wolf
- Pablo – Clifford David
- Louis – Joe Grifasi
- Petrone – William Hickey
- Laureen – Alma Cuervo
- Niles – Paul Schierhorn
- Paullette – Joyce Fideor
- Directed by: Walt Jones
- Music composed by Lawrence Wolf

== Plot summary ==
The play (subtitled "A Mysterious Overture") is an extended one-act, lasting about an hour, with a single set. The action takes place at the house of Niles, a jazz musician, although it is indicated very sparsely. There is an upstage wall and two pieces of furniture: an armchair and a floor lamp with an elaborate lamp shade depicting a tropical scene. An upright piano painted white, matching the upstage wall, is against the wall. The white, chalk outline of a dead body is drawn on the stage floor in front of the armchair. The Pianist enters, wearing an old-fashioned costume. He never speaks but only plays various kinds of jazz music, as described in the script. The play begins after he enters, sits down at the piano (facing away from the audience), cracks his knuckles high above his head, and there is a loud, female scream offstage as the lights go out. They come back on.

Enter Pablo and Louis, the two detectives, also wearing old-fashioned costumes. They speak in an odd kind of dialogue, which is one part film noir and the other part abstract poetry. They are investigating what may be the suicide of Niles, the owner of the house. His body (indicated by the chalk outline) was found on the floor, with its face and fingerprints completely cut out, so he can't be identified for sure. Louis concocts a "theory" about the murder in a long speech which makes very little sense. The two detectives quarrel with each other and threaten to quit.

Two friends of Niles enter, one at a time. Petrone has a saxophone but only makes noise with it – it seems as if he doesn't know how to play it. The same is true of Laureen, who has a bass fiddle. Each of them quarrels with the detectives and describes Niles, their hero, as a great genius who composed music which was so far ahead of its time that no one understood it. While these bizarre discussions are going on, Niles enters with Paulette and a large suitcase full of props. Niles and Paulette cannot be seen by the others, although they share the stage with them.

The action alternates between the "investigation" involving the detectives, Petrone, and Laureen; and various rituals in which Paulette leads Niles, in an effort to banish the other characters, leaving the house for Niles. Paulette's rituals don't work. Finally Niles decides to make himself visible to the detectives – this will mean disaster for him, and Paulette flees. Niles delivers a long, poetic speech in which he seems to be ready for anything the detectives can do to him.

The detectives arrest Niles and handcuff him – each detective is locked to Niles by handcuffs. The detectives lead off Niles for his punishment – he faked his own suicide, and they can't let him get away with that – and maybe he committed a murder, leaving a corpse on the floor of his house. The music from the jazz piano and the noise from the two "musicians" mounts as the detectives lead Niles away. The stage lights fade out. The tropical lampshade winks out, apparently by itself, leaving the stage dark, as the noise and music continue, but they eventually fade out, as the play ends.

== Text ==
- Shepard, Sam (2006). Fool for Love and Other Plays. New York: The Dial Press. ISBN 0-553-34590-7.
