= La pura mentira =

- Directed by: Carlos Malavé
- Written by: Henry Herrera; Jose Montero
- Starring: Mariaca Semprún; Ernesto Calzadilla; Gigi Zanchetta; Jesús Cervo
- Release date: 31 August 2012; (Venezuela)
- Country: Venezuela
- Language: Spanish

La pura mentira is a 2012 Venezuelan film. It is directed by Carlos Malavé and written by José Moreno. It stars Mariaca Semprún, Ernesto Calzadilla, Gigi Zanchetta and Jesús Cervo. It was released on 31 August 2012 in Venezuela.

== Cast ==
- Mariaca Semprún
- Ernesto Calzadilla
- Gigi Zanchetta
- Jesús Cervo

== Plot ==
Juana has a supernatural gift: to detect when someone is lying. With this quality, Juana manages to become a big star on national television with a program where she unmasks public figures. In her attempt to impose the truth at all costs, love will cross her path to show her that her talent can now be her worst enemy.
