= Julio Alcázar =

Spanish actor (1943–2025)

Julio Manuel García Bastida (29 May 1943 – 2 August 2025), better known as Julio Alcázar, was a Spanish actor and director based in Venezuela.

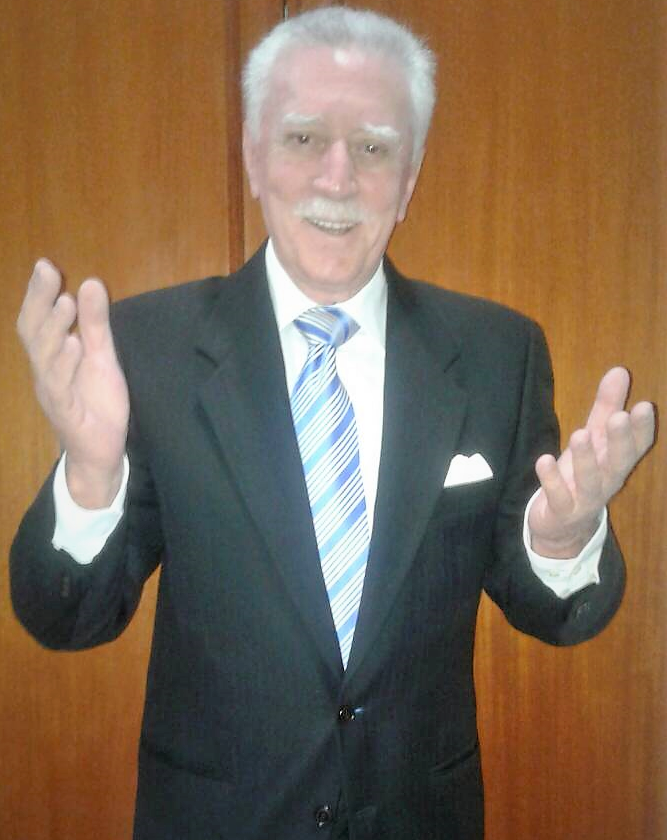
Julio Alcázar

== Life and career ==
Bastida was born 29 May 1943 in La Torre, La Coruña. Throughout his career, he was credited in a number of film, television and stage productions, including Marielena, Toda mujer and Sabor a ti.

Alcázar died in Caracas on 2 August 2025, at the age of 82.
