= Aunque mal paguen =

- Also known as: Un amor distinto en un pueblo diferente
- Genre: Telenovela; Romance
- Created by: Alberto Barrera Tyszka
- Written by: Abigail Truchsess; Gennys Pérez; Alberto Barrera Tyszka
- Directed by: Carlos Izquierdo; Edgar Liendo; Dayan Coronado
- Starring: María Antonieta Castillo; Miguel de León; Ana Karina Manco; Marialejandra Martín; Crisol Carabal; Yul Bürkle
- Opening theme: Aunque mal paguen by Calle Ciega
- Country of origin: Venezuela
- Original language: Spanish
- No. of episodes: 172

Production
- Executive producer: Sandra Rioboo
- Producer: Alejandro León
- Production locations: El Guayabo, Zulia
- Cinematography: Fredy García
- Running time: 40-44 minutes
- Production company: Venevisión

Original release
- Network: Venevisión
- Release: April 25, 2007 – January 22, 2008

Aunque mal paguen (English title: Destiny) is a Venezuelan telenovela written by Alberto Barrera Tyszka and produced by Venevisión in 2007.

María Antonieta Castillo and Miguel de León star as the main protagonists while Ana Karina Manco, Desideria D'Caro and Josué Villae star as antagonists.

== Plot ==
Soledad is a young, beautiful woman who lives in the small, quiet town of El Guayabo where she works at the local tobacco factory "Caribana" as a winder. One night, destiny brings her to meet Alejandro, a young and ambitious developer from the city who has lost his memory after being hit on the head and robbed of his possessions. After a while, the townspeople discover that Alejandro is the owner of the town and the man behind the development project of a beach resort that will destroy their simple way of life, their homes and the tobacco lands surrounding the factory which forms their only source of income. Everyone begins to treat him with hostility, although he himself is yet to regain his memory.

It is after this discovery that it is revealed that Soledad's real mother who was thought to be dead is actually alive. Catalina spent the last 20 years in prison for killing her abusive husband who was actually the son of the town's patriarch, Don Luis Santana, owner of the tobacco factory. Because of this, she is the only legitimate heir and owner of the tobacco lands and thus, she can undo the sale of the lands to the developer. Don Luis, who is aware of Soledad's true paternity, offers Catalina a deal that if she saves the town from ruin, then he will reunite her with her daughter.

Mother and daughter do not know of each other's existence, as Soledad thinks that the parents that raised her are her real parents while Catalina thinks that her daughter was adopted in another country. Mother and daughter will finally be reunited, but they will both fall in love with the same man, thus tearing them apart.

== Cast ==
- María Antonieta Castillo as Soledad
- Miguel de León as Alejandro Aguerrevere
- Ana Karina Manco as Catalina Quiroz
- Marialejandra Martín as Thaís
- Roberto Lamarca as Rubén Darío
- Crisol Carabal as Amparo/Aguamiel
- Amilcar Rivero as Sargento Salazar
- Desideria D'Caro as María Fernanda
- Yul Bürkle as Tómas
- Javier Paredes as Miguel
- Bebsabé Duque as Tibisay
- Josué Villae as Esteban
- Antonio Cuevas as Rafael
- Rhandy Piñango as Padre Ignacio
- Alba Valvé as Margarita
- Reinaldo José Pérez as Edmundo
- Paula Bevilacqua as Marilyn
- César Román as Andrés
- Gregorio Milano as Taparita
- Freddy Aquino as Toñito
- Marjorie Magri as Tamara
- Alejo Felipe as Don Luis Santana
- Flor Elena González as Doña Carmen
- José Torres as Cheche
- Tania Sarabia as Titina
- Francis Romero as Sagrario
- Beatriz Vázquez as Inés
