= Nicolas Felizola =

Venezuelan fashion designer

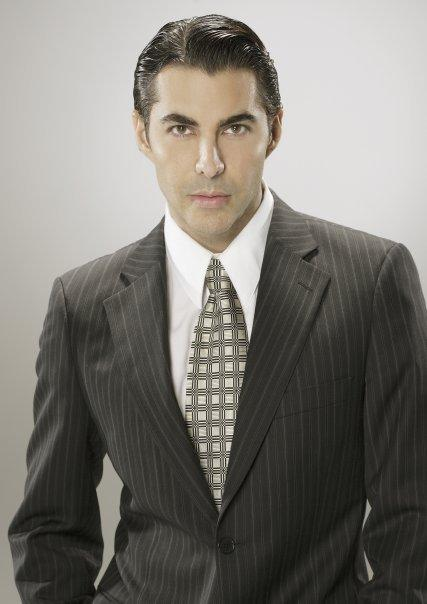

Nicolas Felizola is a Venezuelan photographer, actor, singer, and fashion designer. He began his career as a fashion photographer. Felizola worked as a photographer for fashion designers such as Alexander McQueen and the House of Givenchy. As an international Fashion Designer Felizola has been awarded and recognized multiple times, such as the "Certificate of Special Congressional Recognition (2012) by members of congress of the United States of America, "Personality of The Year Award" (2012) by Opi at the Unesco, Paris, France, "Best Designer of Miami Fashion Week," and Miami Fashion Icon award presented by Tiffany & Co. for his Prive evening gown and Uomo collections; the "Zanetti Murano Award" in Italy; the "Universal Excellence Award." Recipient of the city of Miami key 2018 and most recently honored with his official day on May 9, 2018, by City of Doral, Florida. Among other important career's recognitions. Felizola was featured in Forbes as "America's Young Fashion Designer," recognized among ten Hispanic Designers that are influential in the United States, such as Carolina Herrera and Oscar de la Renta.

== Collections ==
- Vibrations Fashion performance At Adrienne Arsht Center for the Performing Arts in 2015
- Felizola Privè in 2014
- Felizola Resort 2014 and Men's Underwear line "Felizolaunderworld"
- MOOI (Inspired by Rembrandt and Vermeer) in 2013
- Cinetique (Inspired by Kinetic Movement) in 2012
- Orinokia (Inspired by the Orinoco River) in 2011
- Seductrice in 2010
- Enamorada (Spanish for "In Love") in 2009
- Del Cuore (Italian for "Of The Heart") in 2008

=== 2009 Enamorada ===
In 2009, Felizola released his new spring/summer collection titled Enamorada. Felizola took inspiration on the 1950s Mexican star María Félix. The designer said about this collection:

"Maria was in love with fashion. She understood that the art of dressing required, like every master's work, unavoidable steps to reach perfection. The cuts and lines that emphasized her waistline and accentuated her silhouette were her trademarks, just like the colors and richness of the garments' textures. Coming into the present time, fine silk gazaar feathers cut in a laborious maneuver, just like flares, embroidery, beading, pleats, French Chantilly lace, and the most exquisite silks embody this collection."

=== 2008 Del Cuore ===
Felizola debuted his Spring/Summer 2008 collection at New York Fashion Week 2008 during a charity luncheon benefiting the AROD Family Foundation, hosted by baseball player of the year, Alex Rodriguez and his wife, Cynthia. When asked about this collection, Felizola said:

"Del Cuore is about the passion of the heart, and this collection is purely from the heart and completely about the passion that a woman has."

== Awards and merits ==
- 2019 Talenpro -Audiovisual's Arts -judge.Panama City -Panama
- 2019 30 years trajectory -Nicolas Felizola - couture fashion Show -Big brothers big Sisters.Ritz Carlton -key Biscayne.
- 2018 NicolasFelizola-oficial day may 9 -proclamation by the mayor of the city of Doral-fl Juan carlos bermudez
- 2018 Evtv recognition as Orgullo Venezolano-Venezuelan Pride award.
- 2017 – "Chiaroscuro Studio Award" – Given to Nicolas Felizola for his contributions to the arts in the United States. Miami FL.
- 2016 – Mayor Tomas Regalado presented the "Key to the City of Miami" to Venezuelan Photographer, Fashion Designer, and Attorney at Law Nicolas Felizola. Miami, Florida.
- 2016 – Mercedes-Benz Fashion Week Santo Domingo 2016 – " Nicolas Felizola Prive Collection." Santo Domingo, Dominican Republic.
- 2016 – Puerto Rico Fashion "Nicolas Felizola Vibrations." San Juan, Puerto Rico.
- 2016 – "Miami Life Achievement Award" For his contributions to the fashion industry and for his philanthropic work in Miami and around the world. Miami, Florida.
- 2016 – Awarded "The Princess Grace of Monaco Award" by the Foundation Grace of Monaco. New York.
- 2016 Cine Argentino award - Presented by Adriana Bianco.
- 2016 Mercy Hospital Auxiliary Award.Miami Fl
- 2016 excellence award achievement by Miami life awards 2016
- 2015 – MISO CHIC Nicolas Felizola "Fashion Show Vibrations" At Adrienne Arsht Center Miami, Florida.
- 2015 – Miami Life Awards " Designer of the Year." Miami FL.
- 2014 – Miami Fashion Week 2014 "Resort Collection." Miami Beach, Florida.
- 2013 Icon of style Award- New York City -by Vanidades-Editorial Televisa
- 2013 – excellence in evening-wear Awards "Miami Fashion Week 2013", Miami Beach FL
- 2013 Miami Fashion Icon Award- by Miami Fashion week -Tiffany&co Award.
- 2013 – PGA (Professional Golfers Association) World Golf Championship, Doral, Florida
- 2013 Golden Smile's Award .Presented by American developing Smiles Foundation.
- 2013 Icono -Lasta Award -highest fashion show of the world -Salar of Uyuni -Bolivia.
- 2012 congressional medal of Merit.presented by Member of congress of United States ofAmerica .washintong Dc.
- 2012 The flag of the United States of America. Washington DC
- 2012 Best Fashion Entrepreneur of the Year Award .presented by EmprenDT Latino.
- 2012 – "BeLive for Colombia, Fashion Show." Miami, Florida
- 2012 -" Caribbean Fashion Week," Santo Domingo, Dominican Republic
- 2012 – "Miami Beach International Fashion Week 2012," Miami Beach, Fl
- 2012 victoria Puig de Lange -International Style excellence Award-Miami Fashion Week .Presented by Tiffany &co
- 2012 Iberoamerican Personality of the year.presented by OPI -Unesco-Paris France.
- 2011 – "Noche Romántica Fundación San Felipe," Panamá, Republic of Panama
- 2011 – "Miami Fashion Week," Miami FL
- 2010 – "Orinokia Nicolas Felizola Prive 2011," Miami, Florida
- 2010 – "República Dominicana Fashion Week," Santo Domingo, Dominican Republic
- 2010 – Designers Choice Award "Miami International Fashion Week ." Miami, Florida by Tiffany & co
- 2010 Mens style Award- Miami Fashion Week presented by Tiffany &co .
- 2010 – "María Félix Exhibition," Bellas Artes Theater-Santo Domingo, Dominican Republic.
- 2010 The Miami Dade county office of the Mayor and board of county Commissioners Recognition-As Internacional Fashion Designer-Presented by Mayor Carlos Alvarez
- 2009 – "Vanidades de la Moda"
- 2009 – "Noche de Estrellas." DF, Mexico
- 2009 – "High Fashion Palm Beach," Palm Beach, Florida
- 2009 – "Miami Fashion Week 2009," Miami, Florida
- 2008 – "Enamorada Fashion Show CIFO Museum." Miami, Florida
- 2008 – "María Félix Exhibition," Miami FL
- 2008 – "Acapulco Fashion "Novias Felizola," Acapulco, Mexico
- 2008 – "Miami Fashion Week 2008," Miami FL
- 2008 - Awarded Best Designer -Zanetti murano- Italy
- 2008 – "Vanidades Fashion Show", Miami, Florida
- 2007 -"Harpers Bazaar Magia de Moda" Miami, Florida
- 2007 – "DFashion Fashion Week." Mexico, DF
- 2007 – "A Rod Family Foundation Fashion Show," New York NY
- 2007 – "Pasarella Fashion Night "Modama" Guadalajara, Mexico
- 2007 – "Miracle Makers Big Brother Big Sister." Miami, Florida
- 2007 – "Miami Fashion Week Miami Showcase." Miami, Fl
- 2007 – "Cosmolounge," San Juan, Puerto Rico
- 2006 Excellency Award-Mexico Df
- 2006 – "Love at First Sight, Ocean Drive." Miami, Florida
- 2006 – "Haper's Bazaar Magia de Moda." Miami, Florida
- 2006 – "MS Fashion Show," Tampa, Florida
- 2006 – "Semana de la Moda 2006," Caracas, Venezuela
- 2006 – "Lanzamiento Revista Nueva," San José, Costa Rica"
- 2006 – "Managua Big Fashion Nicaragua" Managua, Nicaragua
- 2006 – "Miami Fashion Week 2006," Miami, Florida
- 2005 – "Acapulco Fashion Week, Acapulco Mexico"
- 2005 – "Caras Fashion Show" Guayaquil Quito, Ecuador
- 2005 – "10 Years of Beauty and Fashion" Nicaragua
- 2005 – "Operation Smile, Los Angeles, California"
- 2005 – "Belleza Por Una Causa, Santo Domingo, Dominican Republic"
- 2005 – Red Carpet International. San Juan Puerto Rico
- 2005 – Miami Fashion Week (Best Designer Award)
- 2004 – "Corazones de la Moda, Miami FL"
- 2003 – Piel Miami Fl.
- 2003 – "Dias de Moda", Ciudad Panamá, Panamá
