= Marta Pérez (singer) =

Cuban mezzo-soprano (1924–2009)

- Marta Pérez (photo with dedication)
- Born: Marta Pérez Suárez; Havana, Cuba
- Died: 19 August 2009; Miami, Florida, US
- Occupation: opera singer

Marta Pérez Suárez (2 August 1924 in Havana, Cuba - 19 August 2009 in Miami, Florida) was a Cuban-American mezzo-soprano and the first Cuban woman to sing in Milan's famed La Scala opera house in 1955.

Marta Pérez in La forza del destino, Teatro alla Scala, Milan, 1955.

Miss Pérez' artistic talents were recognized early in life and as a little girl she studied singing with Marila Granowska. By the age of 13, she was performing as a soloist with the Havana Philharmonic Orchestra. In the 1940s she began a series of tours with Ernesto Lecuona. Perez was the first to record Gonzalo Roig's zarzuela, "Cecilia Valdés". She sang at the renowned opera house La Scala in Milan, Italy in 1955, in the role of Preciosilla in Verdi's opera La Forza del Destino, sharing the stage with Renata Tebaldi and Giuseppe di Stefano. In 1961, she performed on The Ed Sullivan Show.

In the 1960s she went into exile in Miami. In 1967, she co-founded the "Pro Arte Grateli Society", a Hispanic theater group. She never married or had children.
