= Luis Oquendo =

Cuban actor (1925-1992)

- Born: Luis Gabriel Oquendo Valhuerdi; 24 March 1925; Havana, Cuba
- Died: 25 August 1992 (aged 67); Miami, Florida
- Occupation: Actor

Luis Oquendo Valhuerdi (24 March 1925 – 25 August 1992) was a Cuban actor who was well known for his acting on radio before going into television and film.

Born in Havana, he permanently immigrated to Florida in 1965. In 1969, he participated in the recording of Cachucha y Ramon a radio soap opera that paired him with actress Norma Zuñiga.

In 1977–1979, he reached the pinnacle of popularity as the grandfather Antonio in the PBS series ¿Que Pasa USA?. He appeared in the movie Guaguasi in 1979 opposite his Que Pasa co-star Velia Martínez and in 1990 in the movie A Show of Force with Andy García and Robert Duvall. In the 1990s he was in the Spanish soap operas, Marielena and El Magnate. He suffered a heart attack while being operated on and died in 1992, while suffering from stomach cancer.

== Filmography ==
Year	Title	Role	Notes
1965	La maldición de mi raza		
1967	La virgen de la calle		
1983	Guaguasi	Perdomo	
1990	A Show of Force	Governor Villanueva	
