= Miguel de León =

Venezuelan actor

Miguel De León
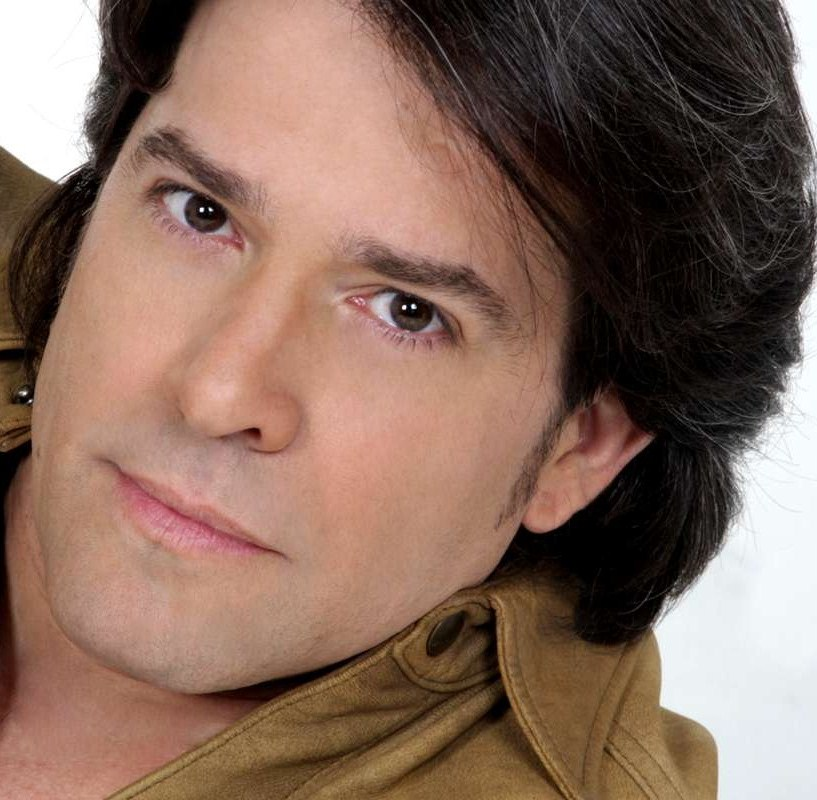
- Miguel de León
- Born: Miguel Angel De León López; February 23, 1962 (age 64); Caracas, Venezuela
- Other name: Miguel Ángel De León
- Education: Central University of Venezuela (BBA)
- Occupation: Actor
- Spouse(s): Nubia Quilarque (m. 1986; div. 1995) Gabriela Spanic (m. 1996; div. 2003) Jeniffer Bracaglia (m. 2004)

Miguel Angel de León Lopez (born February 23, 1962) is a Venezuelan actor. He is better known as Miguel de León. He has acted mainly in telenovelas, which garnered him international fame across Latin America, where the genre is popular, particularly among women. He is also known to Hispanic audiences in the United States.

== Biography ==
De León was born in Caracas, Venezuela, and graduated from the Colegio Universitario de Caracas with a degree in business administration. Continuing with his studies, de León joined the Taller Universitario de Teatro Macanillas. After graduating from that school, de León became a staff member at Radio Caracas Television, where he studied acting further.

His acting debut came in a 1988 film, Señora Bolero ("Ms. Bolero"). Later that year, he participated in his first telenovela, Sueño Contigo ("I dream of you"). He was soon signed to a multi-year contract by Radio Caracas Television. Other films de León has acted in include a Venezuelan version of Batman, and El Cristo de las Violetas ("Jesus of the violets").

In 1989, de León played "Leonardo" in La Revancha ("The rematch"), a major Venevision hit. He acted in four other telenovelas before his first appearance at a major international hit, 1993's Kassandra, where he played "Ernesto Rangel", acting alongside Puerto Rican actor Osvaldo Ríos, among others.

During the middle 1990s, de León married another Venezuelan telenovela star, Gaby Spanic. He had been previously married to Nubia Quilarte.

After Kassandra, de León made three more telenovelas before he and his wife decided to accept offers by Mexico's Televisa. The couple then moved to Mexico City. 1998's Gotita de amor ("Small drop of love") marked de León's debut in Mexican telenovelas. He acted alongside Laura Flores, Julio Alemán, Raúl Araiza Jr., Niurka Marcos, Adriana Fonseca, Andrea Lagunes and Daniela Luján, among others, in that telenovela. Next, he and his wife starred together in La usurpadora, which also became a major international hit. Around that time, de León obtained Mexican citizenship, which he later gave up after returning to Venezuela.

2000s Carita de Angel ("Angel Face"), gave de León an opportunity to act alongside acting legends Libertad Lamarque and Silvia Pinal. In 2001, de León acted in an episode of the well-known series, Mujer, Casos de la Vida Real ("Women, real life stories").

Around that time, his wife left Mexico to film a telenovela in Colombia alongside actor José Ángel Llamas. Rumors of an adulterous relationship between his wife and Llamas surfaced, and the couple eventually divorced. In 2002, de León returned to Venezuela. His last Mexican telenovela was recorded before he left; ¡Vivan los niños! ("Long live the children") put de León with child star Andrea Legarreta and with Juan Ferrara.

- 2003 - Alegrijes y Rebujos (Mexico)
- 2004 - Mariana de la Noche (Mexico)

Miguel de León has filmed three other telenovelas after returning to Venezuela. He was signed by Venevision to work for that channel.

== Filmography ==
Television
Year	Title	Role	Notes
1988	Abigail		Recurring role
1989	La revancha	Leonardo	Recurring role
1989-1990	Fabiola	Alejandro Fuentes	Recurring role
1990-1991	Caribe	Luis Alfredo	Lead role
1991	Sueño contigo	Unknown character	Recurring role
1992-1993	Kassandra	Ernesto Rangel	Recurring role
1993	La millonaria Fabiola	Unknown character	Recurring role
1993-1994	Amor de papel	Diego Corral	Co-lead role
1994	María Celeste	Santiago Azpurua	Lead role
1994	Como tú, ninguna	Raúl de la Peña	Recurring role
1996	Sol de tentación	José Armando Santalucía	Lead role
1998	La usurpadora	Douglas Maldonado	Recurring role
1998	Gotita de amor	Ulises Arredondo	Recurring role
1999	Nunca te olvidaré	Dr. Leonel Valderrama	Recurring role
2000–2001	Carita de ángel	Luciano Larios	Lead role
2001-2002	Mujer, casos de la vida real	Various roles	Episodes: "Agonía" and "Belleza en flor"
2002–2003	¡Vivan los niños!	Alonso Gallardo	Recurring role
2003–2004	Alegrijes y rebujos	Antonio Domínguez	90 episodes
2004	Mariana de la noche	José Ramón Martínez	10 episodes
2004-2005	Sabor a ti	Leonardo Lombardi	Lead role
2006	Los Querendones	Unknown character	Recurring role
2007	Aunque mal paguen	Alejandro Aguerrevere	Lead role
2011	La viuda joven	Vespasiano Calderón	Co-lead role
2012	Mi ex me tiene ganas	Franco Rosas	Recurring role
2013	Las Bandidas	Gaspar Infante	Recurring role
2014	La virgen de la calle	Rogelio Rivas	Lead antagonist
2014	Escándalos	Cristobál	"El lado oscuro" (Season 1, Episode 1)
2015	Amor secreto	Leonardo Ferrándiz Aristizábal	Lead role
