= Marisela Buitrago =

Venezuelan actress and beauty queen

Marisela Buitrago Mora (born June 18, 1958) is a Venezuelan actress and beauty queen. She is perhaps better known internationally for her participation in the 1982 Puerto Rican-Venezuelan film co-production Menudo: La Película, alongside Puerto Rican boy band Menudo (where she played Rene Farrait's love interest) but she is also known in Venezuela for her various participations in telenovelas there, including the major television hit show, Leonela.

== Biography ==
Buitrago is from Aragua.

In 1979, she participated in Miss Venezuela 1979, representing her state of Aragua. Buitrago competed against, among others, Jeanette Rodriguez and Tatiana Capote. She placed 6th in the competition.

In 1982, she participated in Menudo: La Pelicula. She had previously participated in 1981's "Luz Marina", a telenovela which opened doors for her in Venezuelan television.

She later participated in ten more telenovelas during the 1980s and in eight during the 1990s.

In 2002, Buitrago acted in 250 episodes of the major telenovela hit, Gata Salvaje.

== Personal ==
She was married to actor William Colmenares (her co-star in Olvidarte Jamás), with whom she had a daughter named Kislev Colmenares Buitrago and a son named Juan Carlos Colmenares Buitrago. Juan Carlos died on May 9, 2021.

== Filmography ==
=== Telenovelas ===
- 1983 Leonela (RCTV) - Lorena
- 1987 Roberta (RCTV) - Marisol
- 1987 Mi amada Beatriz (RCTV) - Antonieta/Raiza
- 1988-1989 Abigaíl (RCTV) - Viviana López
- 1990-1991 Pasionaria (Venevisión) - Raiza de Tovar
- 1991 Mundo de fieras (Venevisión) - Leonicia
- 1991-1992 La mujer prohibida (Venevisión) - Anabelle Rivas
- 1994, Morena Clara (Venevisión) - Laura
- 1995, Ka Ina (Venevisión) - Lola López
- 1996, El perdón de los pecados (Venevisión) - Casiana
- 1999, Cuando hay pasión (Venevisión) - Solbela Rengifo
- 2000, Mis 3 hermanas (RCTV) - Sofía Quintero De Solís
- 2002-2003 Gata salvaje (Venevisión) - Claudia Olivares
- 2004-2005 Inocente de ti (Televisa) - Fe
- 2006 Olvidarte jamás (Venevisión) - María
- 2008 Amor comprado (Venevisión) - Lisette
- 2015 Guerreras y Centauros (TVes) - Muñeca Arrieta

=== Movies ===
- 1982, Menudo: la película - Marión
- 1992, La dulce tía
- 2017, Un delincuente en Nueva York - Lorena
- 2018, Locos y Peligrosos - Laura

== See also ==
- List of Venezuelans
