= Jeanette Rodríguez (actress) =

Venezuelan actress and television show host

Jeanette Joséfina Rodríguez Delgado (born May 16, 1961, in Caracas, Venezuela) is a Venezuelan television actress and former beauty queen. Rodriguez is remembered for her participation in such telenovelas as "Cristal", "Pobre Diabla" and "Amandote", all of which in where she was the main protagonist, and in "Topacio". She has acted professionally in places such as Venezuela, Argentina, Italy and the United States, where she resides.

== Early life ==
Rodriguez did not have a very happy childhood. In 2020, she declared to Argentine newspaper La Nacion that as a kid, she observed violence in her family. Her parents divorced, and, in that same interview she described her family as "dysfunctional".

== Career ==
When she was 17 Rodriguez was crowned as "Venezuela's prettiest face" and, at 18 in 1979, she participated at the Miss Venezuela 1979 contest, where she competed against fellow future famous actresses Tatiana Capote and Marisela Buitrago, among others. Rodriguez represented the state of Trujillo. In 1981, she represented Venezuela in the 1981 Miss Maja Internacional contest held in Spain, where she placed in third place out of 30 international contestants.

Rodriguez began her acting career by studying at the Juana Sujo acting school in Caracas. She also took some singing classes. She soon began participating in such telenovelas as 1983's "Leonela" (where she played "Patricia 'Patty' Machado"), "Rebeca" (where she played the role of one of the antagonists, named "Geraldine") and "Topacio", but she rose to fame with her participation in "Cristal", where she played the female lead role of "Cristina Exposito", a poor woman who becomes an international model and falls in love with the lead male character, played by Carlos Mata.

"Cristal" debuted on Radio Caracas Television on August 5, 1985, and it launched Rodriguez into stardom. In it, she also shared credits with Lupita Ferrer and former Los Chamos member Gabriel Fernandez, among others.

In 1986, Rodriguez and Mata were once again paired, as the stars of a RCTV telenovela named "La Dama de Rosa" ("The Pink Lady"), which was another hit.

The success of "La Dama de Rosa" was such that in Spain, Rodriguez was hired as a television show host; she hosted Telecinco's 'Las Noches de Tal y Tal" ("Whom and Whose Nights"), alongside Jesus Gil. The program lasted for 35 shows.

In 1988 Rodriguez traveled to Argentina, where she became a household name as the main female star of megahits, 1988's "Amandote" ("Loving You") and 1990s "Pobre Diabla" ("Poor She-Devil"). Pobre Diabla was also shown in the United States on Univision, giving her exposure in that country as well.

== Retirement ==
1992's "Micaela" marked Rodriguez's final telenovela for a while. She participated in 180 episodes as an actress at "Micaela", but a harrowing situation which allegedly took place with an Argentine producer whom she did not name, in a production which she also did not name, convinced her to step away from the world of show business. During an interview with newspaper La Nacion, she declared that the alleged offense took place when the producer grabbed her buttocks,

In 1997, Rodriguez starred in Venezuelan telenovela "Todo por tu amor" ("All For Your Love").

In 2005, Rodriguez made her film debut in the made-for-television movie, "Silvia Rivas, Divorciada" ("Silvia Rivas, Divorced Woman") as the titular "Silvia Rivas". Since, she participated in the 2016 made-for-television movie "Hada Madrina" ("Fairy") and in the 2020 television series "Las Increibles Aventuras de una Hada Madrina" ("The Incredible Adventures of a Fairy"). In both children's productions, she played the titular character, "fairy'.

== Personal life ==
Rodriguez is of Spanish descent, as two of her grandparents emigrated to Venezuela from Spain, one grandmother from the Vigo region and one of her grandfathers from Tenerife.

Rodriguez has never been married; she has had several notable relationships, including one with singer Trino Mora and one with her manager, Jorge Hane. She was about to get married twice to unidentified men, once in Spain and another time in Argentina.

She lived in Argentina and in Spain for large periods of her life; as of 2023, she lived in Miami, Florida.
