= Rosario Prieto =

Dominican actress

- Born: Rosario de los Milagros Prieto Pérez; 13 April 1942 (age 84); Dominican Republic
- Occupation: Actress
- Years active: 1959–present
- Spouse: Chucho Sanoja
- Children: 5

Rosario de los Milagros Prieto Pérez (born 13 April 1942) is a Dominican actress, who has developed her career in Venezuela.

== Biography ==
When she was one and a half years old, Rosario Prieto arrived in Venezuela with her parents, who were political refugees. Despite being born in the Dominican Republic, the actress identifies as Venezuelan.

== Personal life ==
One day, when Rosario Prieto was dancing on the stage of "El Show de Renny" she met Chucho Sanoja, director of the RCTV orchestra. She fell in love married him. She then began to explore the world of singing, since she was part of the orchestra led by her husband and studied with master Eduardo Lanz. Two years after being married, Rosario Prieto had her first daughter named María Eugenia Sanoja Prieto and later, three sons who died. She then traveled to the United States where she studied choreography upon returning to Venezuela, worked for thirteen years on the newly opened CVTV channel. During this time, the actress had her second daughter, Carolina Prieto de Fernández.

== Career ==
Jorge Citino was the choreographer of that program in 1959 and, in his arduous search for all the academies of Caracas to find a classical dancer, he selected Rosario Prieto to be part of "El Show de Renny." One day, when Rosario Prieto was dancing on the stage of "El Show de Renny," she met Chucho Sanoja, director of the RCTV orchestra. She fell in love married him. She then began to explore the world of singing, since she was part of the orchestra led by her husband and studied with master Eduardo Lanz. As a member of the RCTV orchestra, which had many contracts with international record companies, Rosario Prieto had the opportunity to travel to different countries. In some nations such as Mexico, the United States and Spain, she studied as a listener in the performing arts schools. While she traveled, Prieto gained interest in acting. So she decided to take formal classes in Venezuela with professor Luis Salazar, the founder of a school of acting training in the country. Rosario Prieto debuted as an actress on RCTV in the mid-1960s. She then traveled to the United States where she studied choreography and, upon returning to Venezuela in 1964, worked in the first program of "El Club del Clan" along with “the brothers” José and Richard Hernandez produced by the recently opened CVTV channel. In 1979, she returned to RCTV and worked uninterrupted until the day of its closure, both in dramatic productions and in different genres: humor, competitions, varieties, and more. In addition to all this, Rosario Prieto has a training school of artistic talent called Buscando el Actor que todos llevamos dentro witch has functioned in Caracas and in several other regions of the country. She has taught acting workshops on television, voice and diction, text analysis and body language, as well as various talks on empirical and spiritual content.

== Filmography ==
=== Television ===
Year	Title	Character	Channel
1970	Simplemente Maria	Paola	Venezolana de Televisión
1971	La consentida de papá	Violeta	Venezolana de Televisión
1971	Cuando se quiere ser feliz	Viviana	Venezolana de Televisión
1973	Mily	Diana Tormento	Venezolana de Televisión
1973	Gabriela	Butterfly	Venezolana de Televisión
1975	Valentina	Violeta	RCTV
1980	Rosa Campos, Provinciana	Elena	RCTV
1981	Marta y Javier	Margó Lizárraga	RCTV
1982	La Guajirita	Leonor	RCTV
1983	Leonela	Mrs. Rodríguez	RCTV
1984	La Salvaje	Ana Aminta	RCTV
1984-1985	Rebeca	Idalina	RCTV
1984-1985	Topacio	Doña Pura	RCTV
1986	Mansión de Luxe	Margarita Luchester	RCTV
1986	Atrévete	Daría Sepúlveda	RCTV
1987-1988	Mi amada Beatriz	Miguelina "Maíta" Paredes	RCTV
1988	La muchacha del circo	Herminia Villas	RCTV
1989	Rubí rebelde	Dorila	RCTV
1989	Amanda Sabater	Witch Morgana	RCTV
1990-1991	De mujeres	Doña Leticia Contreras	RCTV
1991-1992	El desprecio	Brígida Albornoz	RCTV
1993	De Oro Puro	Fausta Gómez	RCTV
1994	Alejandra	María de Bustamante	RCTV
1994-1995	Pura sangre	Estacia Briceño	RCTV
1996	Los amores de Anita Peña	Pancha Mata	RCTV
1997	María de los Ángeles	Gertrudis Márquez	RCTV
1999	Mujer secreta	Evencia de Romero	RCTV
1999-2000	Mariú	Doña Albertina Navarrete	RCTV
2000-2001	Viva la pepa	Doña Trina Santaella	RCTV
2001-2002	A calzón quita'o	Doña Celeste de Contreras	RCTV
2002-2003	Trapos íntimos	Doña Eulalia Pinzón	RCTV
2004	¡Qué buena se puso Lola!	Luz Elena Aguirre	RCTV
2005-2006	Amor a Palos	Zoila Revueltas	RCTV
2007	Camaleona	Numidia Valecillos Vda. de Alcántara	RCTV
2008-2009	Nadie me dirá como quererte	Gregoria Salas	RCTV
2009	Esto es lo que hay	Doña Carmen González	RCTV
2012-2013	Teresa en tres estaciones	Petra Bautista	TVes
2015-2016	Amor secreto	Coromoto	Venevisión
2020	Almas en Pena	Mrs. Elisa	RCTV

=== Movies ===
Year	Movie	Character	Director
2016	Locos y Peligrosos		Javier Paredes and Eduardo Cerrano
2017	Más vivos que nunca	Paloma	Alfredo Anzola

== Awards and nominations ==
Year	Award	Category	Work	Result
2018	ACACV Awards	Best Supporting Actress	Más vivos que nunca	Winner
