= Vivir para amar =

- Genre: Telenovela
- Created by: César Cierra
- Directed by: José Gregorio Scala; José Luis Limanski
- Starring: Fedra López; Jorge Reyes; Vanessa Mendoza; Daniel Terán
- Opening theme: "Vivir para amar" by Marta Sánchez
- Country of origin: Venezuela
- Original language: Spanish
- No. of episodes: 80

Production
- Executive producer: Antonio Franco
- Producer: Vladimir Salazar
- Camera setup: Multi-camera

Original release
- Network: TVes
- Release: September 23, 2015 – April 12, 2016

Related
- Guerreras y Centauros; La viuda millonaria

Vivir para amar, is a Venezuelan telenovela produced by Antonio Franco for TVes. It is the first telenovela produced in the studios of TVes.

Fedra López and Jorge Reyes star as the main protagonists, Vanessa Mendoza and Daniel Terán as co-protagonists.

Written by César Cierra, directed by José Gregorio Scala and José Luis Limanski, and produced by Antonio Franco as executive producer and Vladimir Salazar as General producer.

== Cast ==
=== Main ===
- Fedra López as Yolanda
- Jorge Reyes as Julio Gavaldón
- Vanessa Mendoza as Diana
  - Yemaya León as Young Diana
- Daniel Terán as Simón
  - Alcedo Zerpa as Young Simón

==== Secondary ====
- Damián Genovese as Rodrigo
- Gigi Zanchetta as América
- Reina Hinojosa as María Teresa
- Luis Fernando Sosa as Gustavo
- Carlos Guillermo Haydon as Hulk
- Adolfo Cubas as Pedraza
- Pablo Martín as Padre Ricardo
- Félix Loreto as Tony
- Dulce María Vallenilla as Valentina
- Samuel Campos as Lucas
- Virginia Urdaneta as Alcira
- Erick Noriega as Miltón
- Roberto Giray as Charlie
- Jennifer Flores as Paty
- Jean Carlos López as Pablito

=== Recurring cast ===
- Antonio Machuca as Fidelio
- Liliana Meléndez as Marta
- Layla Vargas as Zuleyma
- Alejandro Palacios Mal Hablado
- Carla Müller as Susana
- Priscila Izquierdo as María Fernanda
- Sheyla Gutiérrez as Bárbara
- Luis Jorge Gómez as Jorge
- Isaac Desiderio as Chucky
- Karina Salaya as Miseria
- Indina Santamaría as Rebeca
- Yamil Inaty as King Kong
- Yanosky Muñoz as Luis Antonio
- Héctor Blanco as Héctor
- Glendy Lias as Cecilia
- José Carolina Seagler as Eva
