= América Barrios =

Cuban Actress

- Born: 11 September 1917; Santiago de Cuba, Cuba
- Died: 5 October 2001 (aged 84); Caracas, Venezuela
- Occupation: Actress
- Years active: 1942-1998 (film & TV)

América Barrio (1917–2001) was a Cuban stage, television and film actress.

== Biography ==
America Barrio born in Santiago de Cuba (11 September 1917) since she was just a girl she participated on all her school cultural acts.

When she was 12 years old, she started singing on birthday parties and charities.

America Barrio study music and singing theory in the Municipal Conservatory of Havana, (today called Amadeo Roldan Conservatory).

She couldn't make much of a career on lyric singing so she started working on radio stations on music programs. On that time she met Juan Manuel Jorge Reyes an actor and director of live radio plays.

He needed an actress for one of the radio productions at that time. America was the perfect match, but she didn't think she was experience enough. Jorge Reyes hired her anyway and since then they work together on cinema, theater, TV and radio.

== Selected filmography ==
=== Films ===
- 1950, The Yacht Isabel Arrived This Afternoon.
- 1942, Pobre hija mía.
- 1951 Six Months of Life

=== Television ===
- 1964, Historia de tres hermanas.(RCTV)
- 1970, Cristina.(RCTV) – Doña Graciela Lopez-Castro
- 1971, La usurpadora.(RCTV) – Fidelia
- 1972, Sacrificio de mujer.(RCTV) – Leonor
- 1972, La doña.(RCTV) – Genoveva
- 1973, La italianita.(RCTV) – Dionisia
- 1973, Raquel.(RCTV) – Tía Leoacadia.
- 1974, Bárbara.
- 1976, Carolina.(RCTV) – María.
- 1977, Iliana (telenovela).(RCTV)
- 1978, La fiera.(RCTV)
- 1979, Mabel Valdez, periodista.(RCTV)
- 1979, Estefanía.(RCTV) – Doña María Gracia De Cataldo
- 1981, Luisana mía.(RCTV) – Luisa
- 1982, Jugando a vivir.(RCTV) – Doña Amalia
- 1983, Leonela.(RCTV) – Doña Marta
- 1983, Bienvenida Esperanza.(RCTV) – Doña Mercedes de Trias
- 1985, Topacio (telenovela).(RCTV) – Doña Hortensia Vda. de Andrade
- 1985, Cristal.(RCTV) – Doña Lucrecia De Bellorin
- 1986, Atrévete.(RCTV)
- 1987, Selva María.(RCTV) – Doña Mirita
- 1988, Alma mía.(RCTV) – Providencia Monagas
- 1988, Abigail.(RCTV) – Madre Teresa
- 1989, Pobre negro.(RCTV) – Doña Águeda De Alcorta
- 1990, Anabel.(RCTV) – Doña María
- 1992, Por estas calles.(RCTV) –
- 1998, Cambio de piel.(RCTV)

== Bibliography ==
- Rist, Peter H. Historical Dictionary of South American Cinema. Rowman & Littlefield, 2014.
