= Niña bonita (TV series) =

Venezuelan television series

- Genre: Telenovela
- Created by: César Miguel Rondón
- Directed by: César Miguel Rondón
- Starring: Eva Blanco; Ruddy Rodríguez; Luis Jose Santander; Abril Méndez
- Opening theme: "Tan Enamorados" by Ricardo Montaner
- Country of origin: Venezuela
- Original language: Spanish
- No. of episodes: 199

Production
- Executive producer: Carlos Suárez / Raúl Díaz
- Running time: 41-44 minutes
- Production company: Venevisión

Original release
- Network: Venevisión
- Release: March 30 – October 11, 1988

Related
- Mi nombre es amor; Maribel

Niña bonita is a 1988 Venezuelan telenovela produced by Venevisión. It stars Ruddy Rodríguez in her first protagonist role and Luis Jose Santander.

== Plot ==
A love triangle forms between Angela, Emilia and Francisco Leon, a young doctor.

Francisco is married to Emilia, but falls in love with Angela without knowing that they are related. Angela has been out of the country for three years, and before going to the capital to meet her family, she stops at Margarita Island where she casually meets Francisco who is there for a medical congress. Angela suffers a small accident while scuba diving, and Francisco comes to her aid. It is through this that they fall in love with each other. After a brief romance, they agree to meet each other, but they never do.

Angela goes to her parents' house where they have organized a welcome home party. When her sister Emilia introduces her to her husband, she discovers that it is Francisco.

== Cast ==
- Ruddy Rodríguez ... Angela Santana
- Luis José Santander ... Francisco Antonio Leon
- Abril Méndez ... Emilia
- Henry Galue
- Martha Pabón ... Dra Virginia Lancaster
- Fernando Flores ... Aquiles
- Raul Xiques ... Eligio Santana
- Eduardo Gadea Perez
- Ramon Hinojosa ... Filiberto
- Helianta Cruz ... Ana Elisa
- Francis Helen
- Laura Zerra ... Alcira
- Mirtha Borges ... Dolorita
- Betty Ruth ... Altagracia
- Chela D'Gar
- Jimmy Verdum
- Mauricio Gonzalez
- Jose Rubens
- Vicente Tepedino
- Carlos Subero
- Vilma Otazo ... Violeta
- Martha Pabon ... Virginia
- Hector Clotet
- Marcos Campos
- Juan Carlos Gardie
- Marisela Leandro
- Marilyn Sanchez
- Ricardo Montaner ... Dr. Alcantar Blanco
- Ernesto Balzi ... Ernesto Martinez
- Eva Blanco
