= La revancha =

La revancha may refer to:

- La revancha (1989 TV series), a 1989 Venezuelan telenovela
- La revancha (2000 TV series), a 2000 Venezuelan telenovela
