= La hija de Juana Crespo =

- Genre: Telenovela
- Created by: Salvador Garmendia; José Ignacio Cabrujas
- Directed by: Román Chalbaud
- Starring: Mayra Alejandra; José Luis Rodríguez
- Opening theme: "Solos tú y yo" by José Luis Rodríguez
- Ending theme: "Diana" by José Luis Rodríguez
- Country of origin: Venezuela
- Original language: Spanish
- No. of episodes: 100

Production
- Production location: Caracas
- Production company: RCTV

Original release
- Network: RCTV
- Release: May 24 – September 11, 1977

La hija de Juana Crespo is a Venezuelan telenovela written by Salvador Garmendia and José Ignacio Cabrujas and produced by Radio Caracas Television in 1977.

Mayra Alejandra, José Luis Rodríguez and Jean Carlo Simancas starred as the protagonists.

== Cast ==
- Mayra Alejandra as Diana Crespo
- José Luis Rodríguez as Gustavo
- Hilda Vera as Juana Crespo
- Jean Carlo Simancas as David
- Alberto Marín as Miguel
- Rafael Cabrera as Raúl Moros
- Amalia Pérez Díaz as Beatriz
- Rafael Briceño
- Zulay García
- Roberto Gray
- Arturo Calderón
- Virgilio Galindo
- Fausto Verdial
- Tania Sarabia
- Carlos Villamizar
- Otto Rodríguez
- Mahuampi Acosta
