= List of programs broadcast by TVes =

This is a list of programs currently, formerly, and soon to be broadcast on TVes in Venezuela.

== Current programming ==
=== Telenovelas ===
- Cordel Encantado (March 9, 2015 – present)
- Guerreras y Centauros (February 23, 2015 – present)
- Lado a Lado (2014–present)
- Porque el amor manda (August 4, 2014 – present)
- Una familia con suerte (April 13, 2015 – present)
- Violetta (August 4, 2014 – present)

=== Children's programming ===
- Casper the Friendly Ghost (2014–present)
- El Chapulín Colorado (2015–present)
- Como tú (2011–present)
- Pet Alien (2014–present)
- Plaza Sésamo (2010-present)
- Hi-5 Australia (2011-present)
- Hi-5 Fiesta
- Hi-5 House (2017-present)
- The Backyardigans

=== Lifestyle programming ===
- Conexión Yoga (2012–present)
- Salud al natural (2013–present)

=== Sports and variety programming ===
- Con El Mazo Dando (2014–present)
- Motores en vivo (2013–present)
- Notables: Mateo Manaure (2014–present)
- TVes en la mañana (2014–present)
- Venezuela sobre tablas (2014–present)

== Upcoming ==
El Moreno Michael (coming soon)
