= Mimí Lazo =

Venezuelan actress and producer

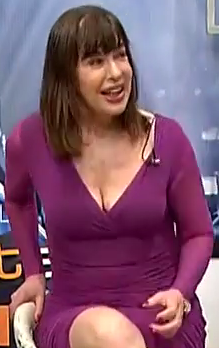
- Born: Ana María Lazo; November 23, 1958 (age 67); Caracas, Venezuela
- Occupations: Actress, Producer
- Spouse(s): Juan Martínez; Orlando Aoun; Jean Carlo Simancas; Luis Fernández
- Children: 1
- Parent(s): Henrique Lazo; Sara Domínguez
- Family: Lasso (nephew)
- Website: http://www.mimilazo.com

Ana María Lazo, commonly known as Mimí Lazo, (born November 23, 1958, in Caracas) is a Venezuelan film, television and theatrical actress and producer. Her most notable role was in the 1996 monologue El Aplauso Va Por Dentro in which she toured all throughout South America and Europe.

== Biography ==
=== Early life ===
She is the second of the three children of Henrique De La Santísima Trinidad Lazo (1921-1995) and Sara Beatríz Domínguez (1930-2011). His brothers are Henrique Alberto and Andrés Eugenio De Jesús. Mimí, began her acting in the workshops of well known stage directors of Caracas in the mid-1970s. Later she received scholarships to study Scenic Arts in Italy and attended acting classes in the Actors Studio of New York.

=== Career ===
She began her acting career in the Venezuelan theatre performing adaptations of plays by William Shakespeare, such as Twelfth Night and Arthur Miller's A View from the Bridge, among others.

In 1979 she made her debut in the Venezuelan cinema with the film El Pez que Fuma, produced by the long time filmmaker Roman Chalbaud, and her first appearance on national television with the popular telenovela Carolina. It wasn't until the year 2000 where she made her debut in the international cinema with the independent film Just for the Time Being alongside Eva Herzigová and Patrick O'Neil.

She has received numerous awards in film festival and theater awards both in her native country and abroad. In 1995 she was among the successful Latin American actresses by Variety magazine, and Style magazine considers her one of the best actresses in Latin America alongside Salma Hayek and María Conchita Alonso.

=== Personal life ===
She married Juan Gerardo Martínez and went to live in Thibodaux, Louisiana. Two years later they divorced, she went to live in Italy and there, in 1981, she married Orlando José Aoun. On September 8, 1982, their daughter was born; Sindy Carolina. A little over a year later, they divorced. At the end of the 80's, he married Jean Carlo Simancas in Mérida, Mérida and they ended up divorcing. On December 28, 1995, she married Luis Fernández (actor). Her daughter, is also an actress and her brother, Henrique is a Film Director; Actor and Musician, father of Lasso (singer)

== Filmography ==
=== Films ===
Year	Title	Role	Notes
1977	El pez que fuma		
1986	Una noche oriental	Leonor Montes	
1991	Terra Nova	Noemi	
1992	Máscaro: el cazador americano		
1992	Los platos del diablo	Sindia Santos	
1998	Milagro en la Sabana	Patricia	
1998	Golpe de estadio	Samara	
2000	Just for the Time Being	Carmen	
2000	Borrón y cuenta nueva	Sindia Santos	
2002	Asesinato en lunes de carnaval	Florencia	
2004	Perder es cuestión de método	Susan Caviedes	
2005	El caracazo		
2006	Mi vida por Sharon, ¿o qué te pasa a ti?		
2007	Tómalo suave	María	Television film
2007	El café de Lupe	Marilyn	Short film
2014	Liz en Septiembre	Dolores	
2016	Tamara	Elena	
2026	The Smoking Fish (2026, film)	La Garza	

=== Television ===
Year	Title	Role	Notes
1976	Carolina	Nurbia	Television debut
1984	La salvaje		
1986	Amor prohibido	Elvira	
1987	Mi nombre es amor	Alejandra	
1989	Los Ultimos Heroes	Manuela	Mini-series with Menudo
1990	De mujeres	Antonieta	
1995	El desafío	Ana Luisa	
1997	Contra viento y marea	Ana Luisa	
1998-1997	El país de las mujeres	Herself	Uncredited
1999	Toda mujer	Celia Martínez	
2000	Angélica pecado	Herself	
2001	Guerra de mujeres	Brigitte Castro de Boni	
2002	Géminis, venganza de amor	Emperatriz	7 episodes
2002	Las González	Azucena	
2002	Mi gorda bella	Eva Lanz de Villanueva	
2003	La invasora	Inés Guerra	
2006-2007	Voltea pa' que te enamores	Gladis López	Co-lead role
2008	¿Vieja yo?	Margot Batalla	Lead role
2013	Los secretos de Lucía	Ayra Mesutti	
2014	Corazón esmeralda	Federica del Rosario Pérez	Lead antagonist; 138 episodes
2016	Para verte mejor		
2017	Rica, Famosa, Latina	Herself	Main Role
2023	Dramáticas	Catalina Montenegro	
