= Chuchito Sanoja =

Venezuelan composer

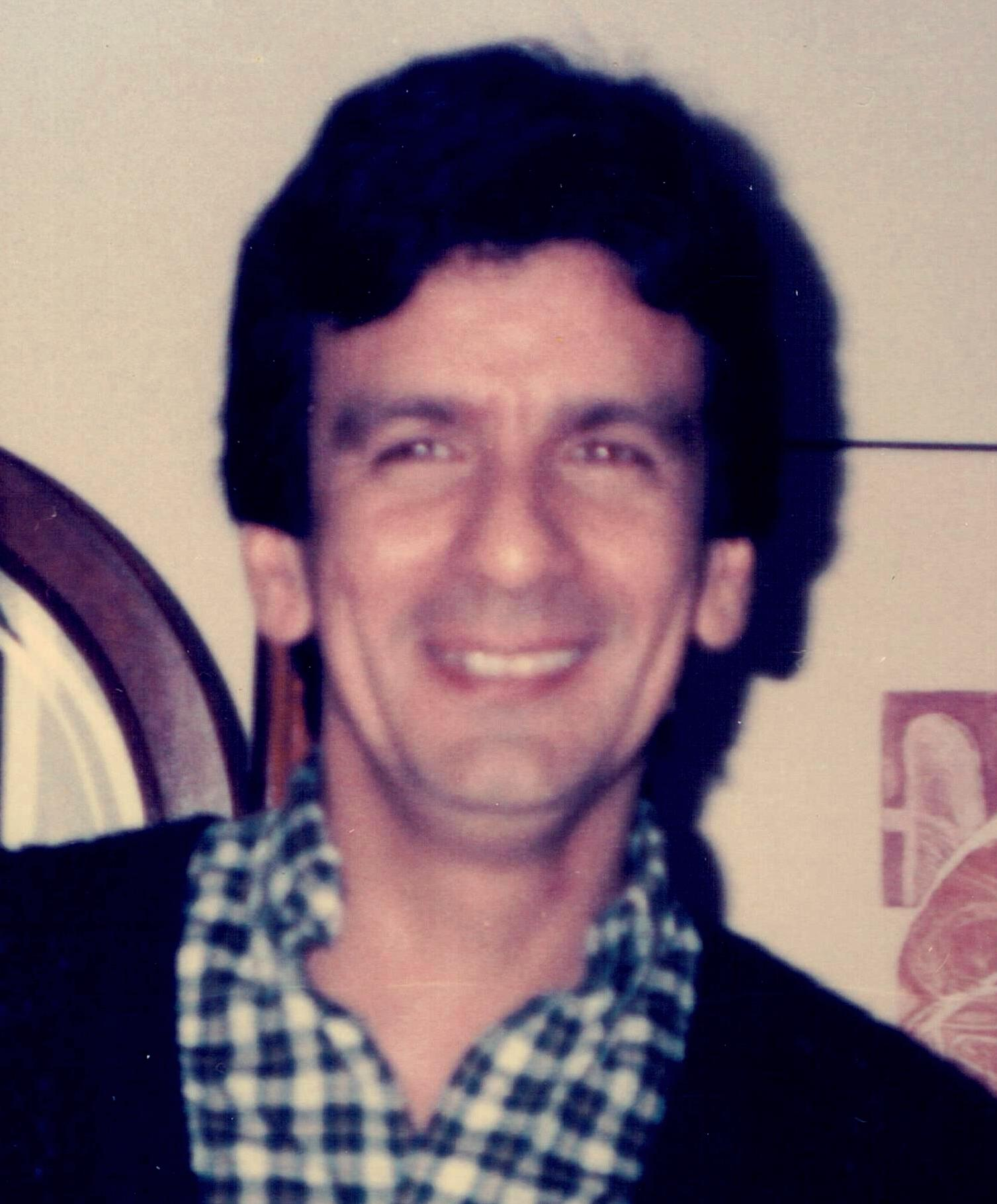
Chuchito Sanoja

Jesús "Chuchito" Bernardo Sanoja Soteldo (b. Caracas, Venezuela, 1946) is a Venezuelan composer, arranger and producer.

== Family ==
Sanoja descends from a family of Venezuelan musicians that include such personalities as Chucho Sanoja; Elisa Soteldo; Rafael and Ángela Soteldo; Antonio, Salvador, Virgilio and Rafael Horacio Soteldo; Jesús "Chuchito" Sanoja studied in Caracas with professors Andres Giovanacci, Atilio Ferraro, Harriet Serr and Aldemaro Romero; and with professors Sigrid Mittendorfer in Germany, and Axel Zungblumt and Vince Benedetti in Switzerland.

== Professional activity ==
Sanoja began his career as a Venezuelan "cuatro" performer in the group "Tres x Cuatro", that included "cuatristas" such as Alí Agüero and Roberto Todd. At a later time double bassist Michael Berti and drummer Frank Rosales joined the group to form another ensemble called Bossa Nova 4, where Sanoja played the guitar. Bossa Nova 4 was the first Venezuelan musical group dedicated to the interpretation of Brazilian music in Venezuela.

After concluding his musical studies in Germany and Switzerland at the beginning of the sixties, Sanoja returned to Venezuela and dedicated himself entirely to composition and musical production for radio and TV commercials, through his company called "Musica y Letra C.A."

Sanoja has created music for numerous national films, such as "País Portátil" (1979), "Mayami Nuestro"; "Muerte en el Paraíso" (1981); "Adiós Miami, "Los Muertos Sí Salen" (1976), as well as "Queridos compañeros" and "El Vividor" (1977); he has composed institutional music for the Museo de los Niños, the Universidad Simón Bolívar, the Hospital Ortopédico Infantil, the Orquesta Sinfónica de Venezuela and the Ballet Metropolitano of Caracas. He has collaborated with renowned artists such as Simón Diaz, Cecilia Todd, Lilia Vera, Jeff Berlín, Eduardo Cabrera, Thomas Chapin, Alberto Naranjo, Aldemaro Romero and others.

== Recognitions ==
Sanoja received a certifícate as Patrimonial Bearer from the Cultural Patrimony of Venezuela Institute (IPC), in recognition for his trajectory as researcher, musician, composer and arranger, and for the importance of his work for the Venezuelan music. This recognition was bestowed to him at the concert "Canción Necesaria por la Paz", which took place at the Museo de Arte Contemporáneo Armando Reverón, located at the Caracas Central Park.
