= Hechizo de amor =

2002 Venezuelan telenovela

- Genre: Telenovela; Romance; Drama
- Created by: Alberto Gómez
- Written by: Silvano Suárez
- Directed by: César Bolívar; Marcos Reyes Andrade
- Creative director: Arquímedes Rivero
- Starring: Emma Rabbe; Guillermo Pérez; Caridad Canelón; Wanda D'Isidoro; Alberto Alifa; Mayra Alejandra
- Opening theme: "Quiereme" by Alejandro Fernández
- Ending theme: "Quiereme" by Alejandro Fernández
- Country of origin: Venezuela
- Original language: Spanish
- No. of episodes: 130

Production
- Executive producer: Sandra Rioboo
- Producer: Carolina De Jacovo
- Production location: Caracas
- Editors: Carlos Garcia; Mario Scata
- Running time: 41-44 minutes
- Production company: Venevisión

Original release
- Network: Venevisión
- Release: 5 April – 21 August 2000

Related
- Toda mujer; Amantes de luna llena

Hechizo de amor is a Venezuelan telenovela written by Alberto Gómez and produced by Venevisión in 2000. The show lasted 130 episodes and was distributed internationally by Venevisión International.

Emma Rabbe and Guillermo Pérez starred as the main protagonists with Mayra Alejandra as the antagonist.

== Synopsis ==
Ligia Valderrama has grown up in the home of her doting father, Francisco Valderrama, and his cold wife Raquela, who she believes is her mother. 20 years prior, Francisco had an affair with Salome Hernandez, Ligia's birth mother. The two stole a million dollars from Raquela's firm before getting in a car accident with baby Ligia. After the accident, Raquela kidnapped the baby, told Salome her daughter was dead, and blackmailed Francisco into keeping her secret.

In a country village, Mabel Alcantara falls in love with Simón Acariza, the son of Arturo Urbaneja Castro, the master of a nearby estate. Unbeknownst to Mabel, Arturo cheated her parents out of the estate, driving them to suicide.

Ligia falls in love with Gabriel Salazar, but Raquela interferes in their relationship. Mabel, pregnant with Simón's child, meets Gabriel, who asks her to marry him. The marriage does not take place as Gabriel and Mabel realize they still love Ligia and Simón.

== Cast ==
=== Main ===
- Emma Rabbe as Ligia Valderrama
- Guillermo Pérez as Gabriel Salazar
- Caridad Canelón as Salomé Hernández
- Wanda D'Isidoro as Mabel Alcántara
- Gigi Zancheta as Carolina Sánchez
- Aroldo Betancourt as Leonardo Sotomayor
- Ana Karina Casanova as Mariana Antúnez
- Alberto Alifa as Juan Diego Urbaneja
- Julio Alcázar - Arturo Urbaneja Castro. Villain character, who stole the fortune of Mabel's family. Arrested by the police Killed in jail by a prisoner
- Mayra Alejandra as Raquela Valderrama. Main Villain character. Goes crazy in the end of the story.

==== Secondary ====
- Niurka Acevedo as Penélope Bracho. Villain, in love with Gabriel
- Miguel Alcántara as Francisco Valderrama
- Ernesto Balzi as Alonso Urrutia. Villain, accomplice and lover of Raquela, killed by Raquela
- Juan A. Baptista as René Castro. Villain, in love with Mabel. Later turns good and become a priest
- Julio Bernal as Venancio Alcántara
- Eva Blanco as Clara de Salazar
- Mirtha Borges as Marina de Alcántara
- Víctor Cámara as Jorge Luis Larrios
- Ana Castell as Dominga Cárdenas
- Miguel David Diaz as Mauricio Sánchez
- Ivette Dominguez as Felicia Hurtado
- Kimberly Dos Ramos as Marta Sánchez
- Alexis Escámez as Higinio Pérez
- Guillermo Ferrán as Felipe Bracho
- Francisco Ferrari as Dr. Germán Duque
- Chony Fuentes as Fedora de Antúnez. Villain, wants to separate Mariana and Silvio
- Gaspar González as Dr. Campo
- Victor Hernández as Claudio Salazar
- Pedro Lander as Marcelo Salazar
- Carolina López as Beatriz Gutiérrez
- Fedra López as Natasha. Villain. Ends in jail
- Lotario as Cheo Meneses
- Eduardo Luna as Det. Miranda
- Antonio Machuca as Dr. Romero
- Ana Martínez as Sonia
- Ana Massimo as Luisa Pérez. Villain, Raquela's accomplice
- Roberto Messutti as Silvio Pérez
- Eva Mondolfi as Cecilia Larrios. Villain. Ends in jail
- Adelaida Mora as Bettina. Villain, but turns good
- Cristina Obin as Inmaculada de Urbaneja
- Miriam Ochoa as Amalia
- Eliseo Perera as Dr. Acevedo
- Dulce Maria Pilonieta as Leticia
- Mauricio Renteria as Padre Angel Jesús
- Víctor Rentoya as Adalberto Cárdenas
- Yvonne Reyes as Regina Fuentes. Villain, friend of Bettina and Penelope.
- Chelo Rodríguez as Adelaida Sotomayor
- Rafael Romero as Hugo Ruiz
- Monica Rubio as Trinita Sánchez
- Betty Ruth as Crisanti Hernández
- Diego Salazar as Amado Cárdenas
- Soraya Sanz as Antonia
- Judith Vásquez as Iraida Montes
- José Vieira as Emilio Cárdenas
- Andreina Yépez as Lorena
