= Isabel Moreno =

Cuban actress (1942–2024)

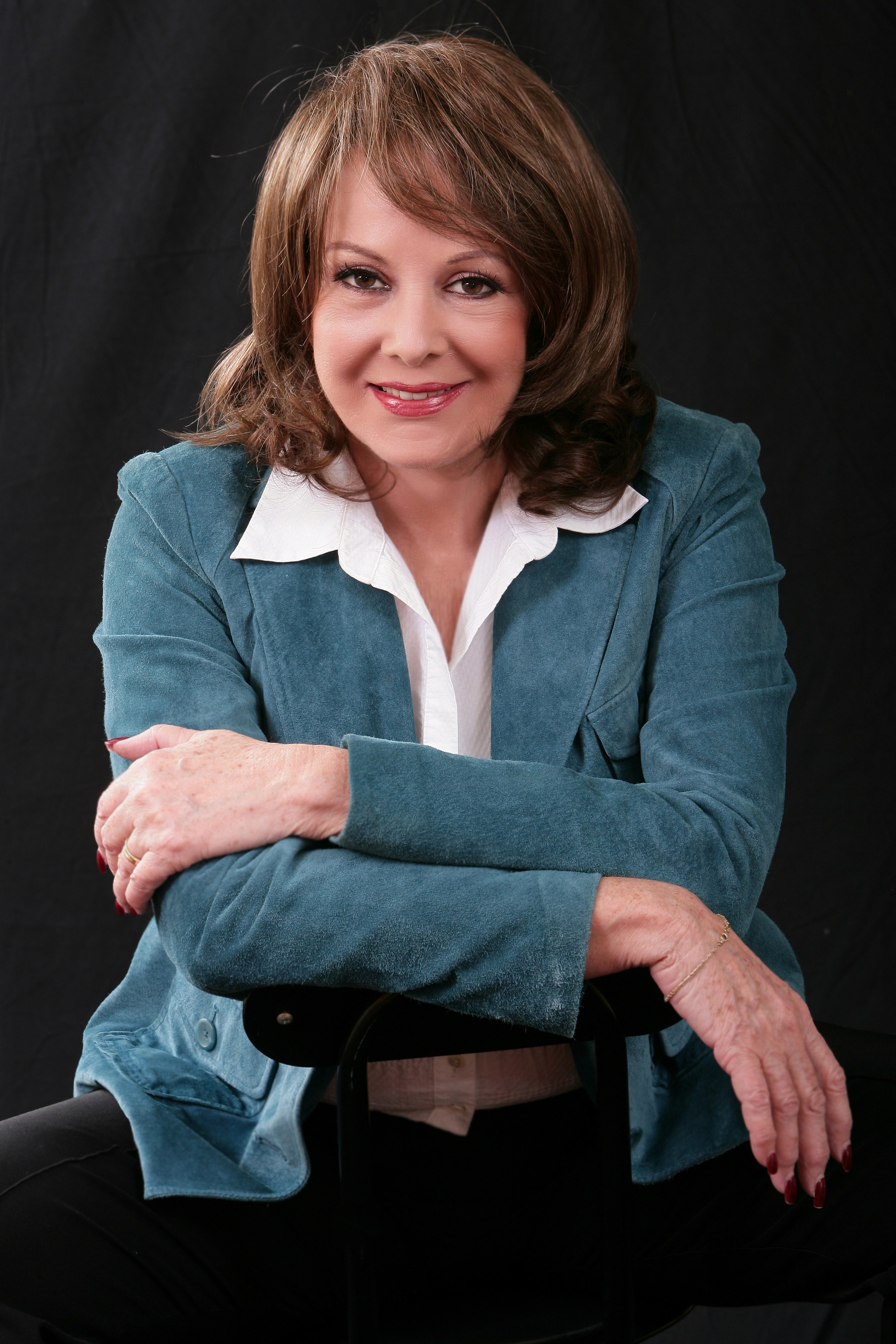
- Moreno in 2012
- Born: Isabel Moreno Pérez; 28 January 1942; Havana, Cuba
- Died: 9 June 2024 (aged 82); Miami, Florida, U.S.
- Occupation: Actress
- Spouse: Gaspar González

Isabel Moreno Pérez (28 January 1942 – 9 June 2024) was a Cuban actress. She worked in Cuba, Venezuela, and the United States, where she later resided. She is known for playing characters such as Teresa Trebijo, La Santiaguera, Chachi, La Mexicana, Soledad Mendoza, Cachita, and Bernarda Alba.

== Biography ==
Isabel Moreno was born in Havana on 28 January 1942, the only daughter of Eugenio Moreno and Isabel Pérez. She was married to actor Gaspar González in the 1970s. They had two daughters and a son.

Moreno died on 9 June 2024, at the age of 82.

== Early career ==
Moreno's beginnings were in the theater, where she spent most of her artistic career, although she ventured into film and television.

In the 1960s, she became involved in the cultural movement of Havana and the formation of several theater groups. She made her debut as an amateur in the play La taza de café, directed by Juan Rodolfo Amán. She participated in the First Worker and Peasant Theater Festival in 1962 with La fablilla del secreto bien guardado.

In 1961, she joined a group of young actors with training in mime and body language under the orders of the French professor Pierre Chausat. She belonged to theater groups such as the Conjunto Dramático Nacional, Las Máscaras, La Rueda, and Guernica, appearing in plays such as A Streetcar Named Desire, Réquiem por Yarini by Carlos Felipe Hernández, The Threepenny Opera, Aire frío by Virgilio Piñera, and Entremeses japoneses by Yukio Mishima.

Moreno joined Grupo Teatro Estudio in 1969, and remained with it for more than 20 years. She taught at the National Art School of Cuba and the Instituto Superior de Arte for several years. In the early 1990s, she emigrated to Venezuela. Her first roles there were in telenovelas on networks such as Marte TV, RCTV, and Venevisión. In early 2001 she arrived in the United States, where she worked in television and theater, with sporadic appearances in film.

== Grupo Teatro Estudio ==
Under the direction of Raquel Revuelta and with the mentorship of Vicente Revuelta, Berta Martínez, and Armando Suárez del Villar, among others, she participated in more than 20 plays, and alternated theater with roles in Cuban cinema and television. This was the most fruitful stage of her career in Cuba. In turn, she made several national and international tours with the company to Spain and other European countries. Some of her most prominent roles were:

- El millonario y la maleta by Gertrudis Gómez de Avellaneda ... Gabriela
- Bernarda (Berta Martínez's version of The House of Bernarda Alba by Federico García Lorca) ... Adela
- The Dog in the Manger by Lope de Vega ... Countess Diana
- El becerro de oro by Joaquín Lorenzo Luaces ... Belén
- El Conde Alarcos by José Jacinto Milanés ... Blanca
- La dolorosa historia de amor secreto de José Jacinto Milanés by Abelardo Estorino ... Carlota
- A Doll's House by Henrik Ibsen ... Nora
- The House of Bernarda Alba by Federico García Lorca ... Adela
- Las impuras by Miguel de Carrión ... Teresa Trebijo
- Blood Wedding by Federico García Lorca ... The Bride
- Santa Camila de la Habana Vieja by José Ramón Brene ... Camila
- Morir del cuento by Abelardo Estorino ... Delfina the old woman
- ¿Y quién va a tomar café? by José Milián ... The Grandmother

== Theater in the United States ==
- 2003: El arte de quejarse or Kvetch, Venevisión Internacional ... The Mother-in-Law
- 2007: O.K., Repertorio Español, New York
- 2010: The Color of Desire, Actors' Playhouse ... Leandra
- 2011: The Misunderstanding, Teatro Avante ... The Mother
- 2011: The House of Bernarda Alba, University of Miami Theater Department ... Bernarda Alba
- 2012: ARPIAS, Hispanic Theater Guild ... Mildred
- 2012–2013: El No, Teatro Avante ... Laura
- 2013: Metamorphoses, adapted by Mary Zimmerman, University of Miami Theater Department ... Various characters
- 2014: Años difíciles, Teatro Avante ... Olga

== Film ==
Year	Title	Director	Character
1964	I Am Cuba	Mikhail Kalatozov	University student
1967	El bautizo	Roberto Fandiño	Lita
1968	Lucía	Humberto Solás	Lucía's friend
1968	La ausencia	Alberto Roldán	
1973	El extraño caso de Rachel K	Óscar Valdés	Doris
1986	A Successful Man	Humberto Solás	Berta
1989	The Beauty of the Alhambra	Enrique Pineda Barnet	La Mexicana
1989	Bajo presión	Víctor Casaus	Clara
1990	Mujer transparente	Héctor Veitía, Mayra Segura, etc.	Isabel
1990	Solteronas en el atardecer	Guillermo Torres	
1994	Deadly Weapon	James Lloyd	CIA Commander
1999	Brenda busca empleo	Eduardo Barberena	Marion
2010	Dos veces Ana	Sergio Giral	Dominique

== Television ==
Year	Title	Director	Character
1987	Hoy es siempre todavía	Tony Lechuga	Chachi
1987	La séptima familia	Juan Vilar	Graciela
1990	La Botija	Danilo Lejardi	Teo's aunt
1992	Divina obsesión	Tito Rojas	Madre Alejandra
1993	Cuando el agua regresa a la tierra	Mirta González Perea	Altagracia
1993	El paseo de la Gracia de Dios	Luis A. Lamata	Soledad Mendoza
1994	Cruz de nadie	Víctor Fernández	Dolores
1996	Pecado de amor	Marcos Reyes Andrade	Amalia Márquez
1996	El perdón de los pecados	Claudio Callao	Hilda Cristina Ramos
1997	Amor mío	Claudio Callao	Carmen de Briceño
1999	Toda mujer	Carlos Izquierdo	Jade
1999	Cuando hay pasión	César Bolívar	Emperatriz Malave
2000	Amantes de luna llena	Cesar Bolívar	Angustias
2001	Not Love, Just Frenzy	Carlos Izquierdo	Corazón
2002	Gata Salvaje	Yaki Ortega	Mercedes Salazar
2004	Anita no te rajes	Danny Gavidia	Cachita Moret
2006	Tierra de Pasiones	Danny Gavídia	Nana
2008	Amor Comprado	Yaki Ortega	Rosa
2009	Alma indomable	Yaki Ortega, etc.	Rafaela Pérez
2015	Ruta 35	Otto Rodríguez	Doña Conchita
2016	¿Quién es quién?	Luis Manzo	Doña Sara
2017	La Fan	David Posada	Mother of Carlos López "Mami"
2017	Milagros de Navidad	Otto Rodríguez	Doña Catalina "Cata"
2019	Betty en NY	Gustavo Loza	Doña Inés "Inesita" Sandoval
2021	La suerte de Loli	Miguel Varoni	Doña Catalina
2022	La mujer de mi vida		Doña Beba Beatriz Salcedo

== Awards ==
- 1987: UNEAC Award for best lead actress for ¿Y quién va a tomar café?
- 2007: HOLA Award for best lead actress for O.K.
