= Víctor Cámara =

Venezuelan actor

- Born: Víctor Manuel Cámara Parejo; June 10, 1959 (age 67); Caracas, Venezuela
- Education: Central University of Venezuela
- Occupations: Actor, politician
- Political party: Independent (since 2020); Democratic (near 1996)
- Website: victorcamara.com/online/

Víctor Manuel Cámara Parejo (born June 10, 1959) is a Venezuelan American telenovela, cinema actor and politician.

== Early life ==
Víctor is the son to actress Elisa Parejo and actor Carlos Cámara, both natives of the Dominican Republic. He has a brother named Carlos Cámara Jr. who is also an actor.

He studied Electronic Engineering at the Universidad Central de Venezuela and parallel studies in theater and acting. He began his career helping his grandparents in the theater in both the artistic and technical department.

== Career ==
His acting career in television and cinema began in 1978 when he joined Radio Caracas Televisión. Since then, he has acted in various telenovelas in his home country Venezuela and in Mexico and the United States.

In 2011, he returned to Venezuela to participate in the telenovela Natalia del Mar to portray the villain for the first time ever since the start of his career in telenovelas.

== Political career ==
Cámara is running for a seat in Doral City Council on 2020 election as independent. Also, he announced his intentions to be mayor of the city, and to defeat the incumbent mayor Juan Carlos Bermúdez. Cámara declared that he supported and participated in the campaign of the Democrat Alex Penelas when he ran for mayor of Miami-Dade in 1996.

== Personal life ==
Víctor is married to Ivette Planchard since 14 February 1977. They welcomed their first child, a daughter named Samantha in 1997.

== Filmography ==
=== Telenovelas ===
Telenovelas
Year	Title	Role	Notes
1979	La comrade	Rosario Reyes	
1981	Luisana Mia	Alfredo	
1982	¿Qué pasó con Jacqueline?		
1982	Jugando a vivir	Máximo Leal	
1983	Bienvenida Esperanza	Gerardo Aparicio	
1985	Topacio	Jorge Luis Sandoval	Main Protagonist
1986	La Intrusa	Luis Antonio Rossi	Main Protagonist
1987	Pobre señorita Limantour	Julio Adrián	Main Protagonist
1989	Paraíso	Adrián Arturo	Main Protagonist
1990	Ines Duarte, Secretaria	Andrés Martan	Main Protagonist
1991	Bellísima	Ricardo Linares	Main Protagonist
1993	Rosangelica	Óscar Eduardo Gel de la Rosa / Argenis	Main Protagonist
1994	Peligrosa	Luis Fernando	Main Protagonist
1996	Pecado de Amor	Alejandro	
1998	El País de las mujeres	Camilo Reyes	Main Protagonist
1999	Toda Mujer	Ricardo Tariffi	Protagonist
2000	Hechizo de Amor	Jorge Luis Larrios	
2001	Guerra de mujeres	Armando	
2002	Las González	Rómulo Trigo	
2003	Rebeca	Sergio Montalbán	
2005	Soñar no Cuesta Nada	Arturo Hernández	
2005	El amor no tiene precio	Nelson	
2007	Bajo las Riendas del Amor	Antonio Linares	
2008	En nombre del amor	Orlando Ferrer	
2010	Perro Amor	Pedro Brando	
2011	Natalia del Mar	Adolfo Uzcategui	Antagonist
2012	El Talismán	Manuel Bermúdez	
2015	Guerreras y Centauros	General José Antonio Páez	
2015/2016	Escandalos	Governator	
2023	Vuelve a Mi		
2025	Velvet: El Nuevo Imperio	Enzo	

=== Film ===
- Luisa ( 2016)
- The Celibacy (2010) as Bruno
- El secreto de Jimena (2009) as Adam
- 13 segundos (2007) as Dr. Eduardo Valladares
- Rosa de Francia (1995) as Roberto
