= Marta y Javier =

- Genre: Telenovela
- Created by: Delia Fiallo
- Written by: Ligia Lezama
- Directed by: César Bolívar
- Starring: Mayra Alejandra; Carlos Olivier; Tatiana Capote
- Opening theme: Un Buen Perdedor by Franco de Vita
- Country of origin: Venezuela
- Original language: Spanish
- No. of episodes: 64

Production
- Producer: Omar Pin
- Production company: RCTV

Original release
- Network: RCTV
- Release: May 1 – July 12, 1982

Related
- Cuidado con el ángel (2008)

Marta y Javier is a Venezuelan telenovela produced and aired by Radio Caracas Televisión in 1982. It is based on the radionovela Siempre te he querido written by Delia Fiallo with this free version adapted by Ligia Lezama. The telenovela ran for 64 episodes and was distributed internationally by Coral International.

Mayra Alejandra and Carlos Olivier starred as the main protagonists with Tatiana Capote as the main antagonist.

== Synopsis ==
Javier, a medical student, falls in love with Marta, the hospital director's daughter, and in his eagerness to woo her, they suffer an accident in which Marta is left blind. But she must face yet another tragedy: the death of her father. These sudden blows fill her with bitterness and, blaming Javier, she refuses to accept that she is in love with him. The young doctor, filled with guilt, goes abroad to specialize in eye surgery and upon his return, he successfully operates on Marta, who does not know who her surgeon is.

== Cast ==
- Mayra Alejandra as Marta
- Carlos Olivier as Javier
- Tatiana Capote as Julia
- Javier Vidal as Ernesto
- Esther Orjuela as Celia
- Tomаs Henriquez as Julio Bermudez
- Nury Flores as Paulina
- Amalia Perez Diaz as Eleonora
- Charles Barry as Luis Camillo
- Hazel Leal as Maria Antonieta
- Rosario Prieto as Lucia
- Rodolfo Drago as Guillermo Ortiz
- Patricia Noguera
