= Mayra Alejandra =

Venezuelan actress

- Born: Mayra Alejandra Rodríguez Lezama; May 7, 1958; Caracas, Venezuela
- Died: April 17, 2014 (aged 55); Caracas, Venezuela
- Occupation: Actress
- Years active: 1975-2010
- Children: 1

Mayra Alejandra Rodríguez Lezama (May 7, 1958 – April 17, 2014) was a Venezuelan actress.

== Early life ==
Lezama was born on May 7, 1958, in Caracas, Venezuela. She was the daughter of Charles Barry, a humorist and founding member of the comedy show Radio Rochela, and Ligia Lezama, a teleplay writer and actress. She had one brother (comedian Juan Carlos Barry) and one sister.

== Career ==
Lezama made her debut in the Radio Caracas Television telenovela Valentina in 1975. Her first starring role was in Angélica (1976) and she later appeared in La hija de Juana Crespo (1977). In 1981, Lezama starred in Luisana Mia. In 1983, she gained recognition for her performance in Leonela. Other notable roles include Bienvenida Esperanza (1983), Marta y Javier (1983), and La mujer prohibida (1991).

Lezama developed a femme fatale image with early roles, notably as Carmen in Román Chalbaud's Carmen la que contaba 16 años (1978) and as Manon Lescaut in Chalbaud’s adaptation of Manón (1986).

Following a hiatus to focus on her family, Lezama returned to acting in 2000 with a guest role in Hechizo de Amor. She later appeared in Estrambótica Anastasia (2004) and Harina de otro costal (2010).

== Personal life ==
Lezama was married twice and divorced. She had a relationship with Mexican actor Salvador Pineda, with whom she had a son Aaron, born in Caracas on March 27, 1989. Despite plans to marry, Pineda left her at the altar in 1987, though he later recognized their son.

Aaron was diagnosed with autism at an early age, and also facing health complications such as gallstones. In 2021, it was made public that he needed an emergency operation. Mayra Alejandra's niece spoke about the Pineda's lack of support towards Aaron.

In 2023, Pineda revealed that when he met Mayra, he was drunk and asked her to marry him. The wedding did not take place, but they had meetings, and months later, she called him to tell him that she was pregnant. He denied that the young Aaron, son of the actress, was his. Hence, he has refused to support him financially.

In 2012, Mayra Alejandra was diagnosed with lung cancer and underwent chemotherapy. After a relapse in early 2014, she died in Caracas on April 17, 2014, at the age of 55.

== Filmography ==
=== Television ===
Year	Title	Character	Channel
1975	Valentina	Mayrita	RCTV
1976	Angélica	Angélica	RCTV
1976	Carolina	Carolina Villacastín	RCTV
1977	Tormento	Amparo	RCTV
1977	La hija de Juana Crespo	Diana Crespo	RCTV
1977	Residencia de señoritas	Violeta	RCTV
1978	Piel de zapa	Paulita	RCTV
1978	Mariela, Mariela	Mariela	RCTV
1978	El ángel rebelde	María Soledad	RCTV
1980	El esposo de Anais	Anais Olivieri	RCTV
1980	Rosa Campos Provinciana	Rosa Campos	RCTV
1981	Luisana mía	Luisana Narváez de Bernal	RCTV
1981	Amada mía	Isabela	RCTV
1982	Barbarita	Barbarita	RCTV
1982	Marta y Javier	Marta	RCTV
1982	Jugando a vivir	Victoria La Rosa	RCTV
1983	Bienvenida Esperanza	Esperanza Acuna	RCTV
1983	Leonela	Leonela Ferrari	RCTV
1984	Miedo al amor-Leonela 2	Dr. Leonela Ferrari Mirabal de Guerra	RCTV
1986	Camila	Camila	RTI Colombia
1986	Juegos Prohibidos	Sandra	Canal 9
1986	Mujer comprada	Angelica Villar	Canal 1
1987	Valeria	Valeria	Telefe
1991	La mujer prohibida	Irene Rivas	Venevisión
1993	Amor de papel	Adela Puerte/Rafaela Villanueva/Adela Beltrán	Venevisión
2000	Hechizo de amor	Raquela Valderrama	Venevisión
2004	Estrambótica Anastasia	Yolanda Paz	RCTV
2005	Con toda el alma	Isabel Morelli	Venevisión
2007	Camaleona	Amapola "Pola" Rivas de Lofiego	RCTV
2010	Harina de otro costal	Carmen "Carmencita" de Fernández	Venevisión

=== Movies ===
Year	Movie	Character	Director
1978	Carmen, la que contaba 16 años	Carmen	Román Chalbaud
1986	Manón	Manón	Román Chalbaud
