= Damián Genovese =

Venezuelan actor and model

- Born: Damián Genovese De Mello; July 10, 1978 (age 46); Caracas, Venezuela
- Occupation(s): Actor, Model

Damián Genovese De Mello (born 10 July 1978) is a Venezuelan actor and model.

== Biography ==
Damián's first television role was in the telenovela Hoy te vi in 1998. After obtaining small roles in television, he ventured into modelling and worked as a fashion Model for various designers and commercials in France and Spain.

In 2008, he participated in the telenovela Torrente produced by Venevisión.

In 2012, he was cast as the main protagonist of the historical telenovela Guerreras y Centauros.

== Telenovelas ==
- Hoy te Vi (1998) as Jorge Cuevas Miquelarena
- Lejana como el viento (2002) as Diego
- Mujer con Pantalones (2005)
- Con toda el alma (2005–2006) as Sebastián Morelli
- Voltea pa' que te enamores (2006–2007) as Gerson López
- Torrente (2008) as Sebastián Gabaldón Leal
- Natalia del Mar (2011) as Ernesto Valderrama
- Guerreras y Centauros (2015) as Eneas Montoya
- Vivir para amar (2015–2016) as Rodrigo

== Theater ==
- Soltero, Casado, Viudo y Divorciado
