= Mi nombre es amor =

- Genre: Telenovela
- Written by: Martha Romero
- Starring: Mimí Lazo; Jean Carlo Simancas
- Opening theme: "Yo pensé que tú" by Kiara
- Country of origin: Venezuela
- Original language: Spanish
- No. of episodes: 142

Original release
- Network: Venevisión
- Release: 1987

Mi nombre es amor is a 1987 Venezuelan telenovela produced by Venevisión and distributed internationally by Venevisión International. Mimí Lazo and Jean Carlo Simancas starred as the main protagonists.

== Plot ==
Alejandra Espinel's life changes suddenly when she is left a widow and her stable life is turned into chaos. She is forced to deal with the loss of her husband, the treachery of his associate, bankruptcy and her two adolescent boys lost in the confusion of life. As she struggles to put her life in order, she will rediscover love in Joaquin, the same person she regarded as her enemy. But their love will be disrupted by the appearance of Aida, Joaquin's wife who abandoned him a year ago.

== Cast ==
- Mimí Lazo as Alejandra Espinel
- Jean Carlo Simancas as Joaquin Almada
