= Toda mujer =

Television series

- Genre: Telenovela; Romance; Drama
- Created by: Pilar Romero
- Directed by: Carlos Izquierdo; Leonardo Galavis
- Starring: Gabriela Vergara; Víctor Cámara; Jean Carlo Simancas; Mimi Lazo
- Opening theme: "Toda mujer" by Karametade "Que Alguien Me Diga" by Gilberto Santa Rosa
- Country of origin: Venezuela
- Original language: Spanish
- No. of episodes: 131

Production
- Executive producers: Arnaldo Limansky; Dayán Coronado
- Producer: Dayan Coronado
- Production location: Caracas
- Production company: Venevisión

Original release
- Network: Venevisión
- Release: 25 November 1999 – 4 April 2000

Toda mujer is a 1999 Venezuelan telenovela produced by Venevisión. An original story written by Pilar Romero, it stars Gabriela Vergara and Víctor Cámara as the main protagonists with Jean Carlo Simancas and Mimi Lazo acting as the main antagonists.

== Plot ==
Everything in Manuela Mendoza's life appears to be in perfect order. She is preparing to marry Ricardo Tariffi, an architect from a wealthy family. However, when everything seems to be going well, Manuela receives a painful surprise. For the past 15 years, Ricardo has been leading a double life. At the age of 18, he had an affair with an older woman named Celia, and they had a daughter, Elizabeth, who is now 14 years old. Although Ricardo has no romantic feelings for Celia, he has never abandoned her because he fears hurting their daughter. Ricardo has kept his second family a secret from everyone, particularly his conservative relatives, who would not accept his relationship with a woman from a lower social class.

Manuela discovers Ricardo's secret and is torn between living an unhappy life by leaving him or forgiveness. She chooses to forgive him. Now, she has to cope with having a teenage step-daughter while also facing the wrath of Celia who is still in love with Ricardo and does everything she can to make Manuela's life miserable. Manuela will try to focus her affection towards Elizabeth while trying to cope with her own repressed feelings about her own mother, a cold and selfish woman who never loved her and left her to be raised by her aunt and uncle.

== Cast ==
- Gabriela Vergara as Manuela Alejandra Mendoza Castillo
- Víctor Cámara as Ricardo Alfonso Tariffi Palacios
- Mimi Lazo as Celia Martínez Guerrero / Cecilia Martínez Guerrero
- Jean Carlo Simancas as Marcelo Bustamante
- Amanda Gutiérrez as Graciela Castillo de Bustamante
- Daniel Alvarado as Néstor Cordido / Benjamin Malaver
- Gigi Zanchetta as Verónica Velásquez
- Elba Escobar as Margot Castillo
- Elizabeth Morales as Joyce Sandoval
- Daniela Bascopé as Elizabeth Tariffi Martínez
- Asdrubal Blanco as René Bustamante Castillo
- César Román as Moisés Cordido
- Javier Valcarcel as Gustavo Mendoza Castillo
- Yanis Chimaras as Juan Marcos Prieto
- María Fabiola Colmenares as Katiuska Grun
- Nancy González as Hortensia Tariffi
- Adolfo Cubas as Renato Chasin
- Deyalit Lopez as Yusmeri
- Isabel Moreno as Jade
- Raul Amundaray as Doctor Fossi
- Jeinar Moreno as Maria del Pilar Briceño
- Julio Pereira as Alejandro Armas
- Rafael Romero as Misael Pérez
- Olga Henriquez as Amparo Cordido
- Caridad Canelon as Rebeca López
- Daniel Garcia as Carlos Eduardo Tamayo / Cayayo
- Patricia Oliveros as Carolina
- Chony Fuentes
- Martha Carbillo as Ethiusa
- Karl Hoffman as Doctor Asdrubal Carpio
- Jenny Noguera as Lola Montes
- Francisco Ferrari as Don Armas
- Lisbeth Manrique as Brigita Pérez
- Jose Luis Zuleta as policía
- Jorge Reyes as Jorge Alvárez
- Antonio Machuca as comisario
- Ivette Dominguez as Madam Dalavis
- Denise Novell as Gabriela
- Zhandra D'Abreu
- Kassandra Tepper as Romina
- Julio Alcázar as Máximo
- Ana Castell as Rosaria
- Carlos Omaña as Dr. Ponce
- Mirtha Borges
- Sonia Villamizar
