= Luisana mía =

- Genre: Telenovela; Drama
- Created by: Ligia Lezama
- Written by: Ligia Lezama
- Directed by: Humberto Morales
- Starring: Mayra Alejandra; Jean Carlo Simancas
- Theme music composer: Sabú
- Opening theme: "Quizás sí, quizás no"
- Country of origin: Venezuela
- Original language: Spanish
- No. of seasons: 1
- No. of episodes: 50

Production
- Producer: Henry Márquez
- Production location: Caracas, Venezuela
- Running time: 60 minutes
- Production company: Coral Pictures

Original release
- Network: RCTV
- Release: May 20 – August 19, 1981

Related
- Elizabeth; Maite

Luisana mía is a Venezuelan telenovela made by RCTV in 1981, original by Ligia Lezama. It stars Mayra Alejandra and Jean Carlo Simancas and with the special participation of Herminia Martínez, Yanis Chimaras, Charles Barry and Virgilio Galindo. It had as its main theme "Quizás sí, quizás no", performed by Sabú.

== Plot ==
Luisana Narváez de Bernal (Mayra Alejandra) is a beautiful and intelligent woman, who refuses to live the rest of her life chained to a kitchen and being only a housewife, however her husband, Juan Miguel Bernal (Jean Carlo Simancas) he is an insecure sexist, who wants to have her almost like a slave, which makes their marriage hell. This is collapsing her family, but Luisana is persistent and will do everything possible to save her marriage and remove those sexist thoughts from her husband's mind so that he understands reality.

== Cast ==
- Mayra Alejandra as Luisana Narváez de Bernal
- Jean Carlo Simancas as Juan Miguel Bernal
- América Barrios as Doña Carlota Andrade
- Zoe Ducós as Estela de Bernal
- Carlos Cámara Jr. as Gregory
- Víctor Cámara as Alfredo
- Herminia Martínez as Victoria Andrade
- Yanis Chimaras as Tomás Vidal
- Raquel Castaños as Corina Bernal
- Virgilio Galindo as Emilio Narváez
- Carlos Márquez as Edmundo Bernal
- Scarlet Villalobos as Elita Bernal Narváez
- Virginia Urdaneta as Flor Narváez
- Dilia Waikarán as Rosina Iñigo
- Yajaira Orta as Jenny González
- Nancy González as Clarisa Pacheco
- Javier Vidal Pradas as Henry Rodríguez
- Sixto Blanco as Lic. Manuel Villegas
- Enrique Benshimol as Don Eduardo Vidal
- María Teresa Acosta as Luisa de Narváez
- Agustina Martín as Esther de Narváez
- Charles Barry as Compadre Oliviero
- Cecilia Villarreal as Cecilia
- Humberto García Brandt as Paúl
- Jenny Galván as Sandra
- Karla Luzbel as Irene
- Humberto Tancredi as Luciano
- Miguel Ángel Landa as Miguel
- Fernando Ortega as Raúl
- Imperio Zanmataro as Sofía
- Lucy Bogado as Raiza
- Haydée Balza as Chela
- Soraya Zanz as Tata
- Hugo Martínez Clemente as Culin
- Rafael Vallenilla as Paquito
- Carlos Flores as Ñeño
- Lorenzo Henríquez as Bachaco
- Freddy Galavís as Periquito
- Miguel Alcántara as Doctor
- Evelyn Berroterán as Stewardess
- Ignacio Navarro as Lawyer
- Enrique Soto as Dr. Cáceres
- Hazel Leal as Agency Model
- Cristina Reyes as Flight Attendant
- Carlos Villamizar as Chief of Personnel
- Axel Rodríguez as Juan Miguel's colleague
- Argenis Chirivela
- Omar Farías
- Aura Gutiérrez
- Oswaldo Gutiérrez
- María Machado
- Iselyn Martínez
- Otto Rodríguez
- Marisabel Vargas
