= Hilda Abrahamz =

Venezuelan telenovela actress and beauty pageant titleholder (born 1959)

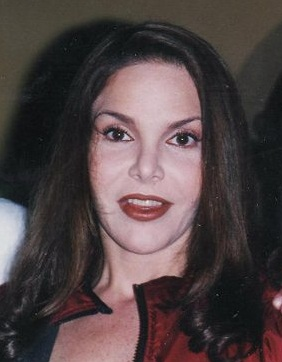
- Born: Hilda Astrid Abrahamz Navarro; November 14, 1959 (age 66); Mérida, Venezuela
- Height: 1.73 m (5 ft 8 in)
- Beauty pageant titleholder
- Title: Miss World Venezuela 1980
- Years active: 1980–present
- Hair color: Blonde
- Eye color: Brown eyes
- Major competitions: Miss Venezuela 1980 (1st runner-up) (Miss World Venezuela); Miss World 1980 (Top 15)

Hilda Astrid Abrahamz Navarro (born November 14, 1959) is a Venezuelan actress and beauty pageant titleholder. She was the official representative of her country in the 1980 Miss World pageant held in London, United Kingdom on November 13, 1980, where she was one of the top 15 semifinalists

== Life and career ==
Abrahamz was born in Mérida, Venezuela and raised in Los Teques. She later moved with her mother to Argentina and graduated from the school. She later returned to Venezuela and in 1980 was the official representative of her country in the 1980 Miss World pageant held in London, United Kingdom on November 13, 1980, where she was one of the top 15 semifinalists. The following year she made her television debut in the RCTV telenovela, Luz Marina and stayed on the network to 1989, playing main antagonists in a number of series. In 1990 she starred in the Panamericana Televisión telenovela, Natacha and in 1991 returned to RCTV with El desprecio. She later starred in Canal 9's Princesa (1992) in Argentina, and again returned to Venezuela.

In 1995, Abrahamz joined Venevisión for starring in the telenovela Ka Ina. She later starred in Quirpa de tres mujeres and Todo por tu amor. In 1999, Abrahamz again returned to RCTV with Carita Pintada and stayed with the network for nine more series. Her most notable series was 2002-2003 telenovela, My Sweet Fat Valentina as the main antagonist. In 2012 she appeared in the Venevisión telenovela, Mi ex me tiene ganas. She spent later years appeared in stage production.

In 2012, Abrahamz made her big screen debut playing transgender woman in the drama film, Blue and Not So Pink. The film won the Goya Award for Best Spanish Language Foreign Film at the 28th Goya Awards, the first Venezuelan film to do so. In 2023 she starred in the Mexican horror-anthology series, La hora marcada.

== Filmography ==
=== Telenovelas ===
Year	Title	Character	Notes
2023	La hora marcada	Woman in Black	Series regular
2019	Carolay	Madam Ponzoña	Supporting Role
2019	Almas en pena	La Calchona	Supporting Role
2012	Azul y no tan rosa (Movie)	Delirio del Río	Supporting Role
2012	Mi ex me tiene ganas	Lucrecia Holt de Miller	Supporting Role
2010	La mujer perfecta	Ella Misma	Guest
2008-2009	Nadie me dirá como quererte	Mercedes de Galindo	Supporting Role
2006-2007	Te tengo en salsa	Gioconda Chaparro	Supporting Role
2005-2006	Amor a Palos	Pamela Jhonson	Main Antagonist
2004	Estrambotica Anastasia	Constanza Borosfky Vda. de Pardo	Supporting Role
2002-2003	Mi gorda bella	Olimpia Mercouri de Villanueva/María Joaquina Crespo	Main Antagonist
2001-2002	La niña de mis ojos	Mercedes Aguirre	Supporting Role
2001-2002	A calzón quita'o	Special Participation	Supporting Role
2000-2001	Angélica pecado	Rebeca Del Ávila Echeverría Vda. de Godoy	Co-protagonist
1999-2000	Carita pintada	Candelaria Pabuena	Protagonist
1997	Todo por tu amor	Andrea Mijares	Main Antagonist
1996	Quirpa de tres mujeres	Manuela de Landaeta/Manuela de Echeverria	Supporting Role
1995	Ka Ina	Maniña Yerichana	Main Antagonist
1994-1995	De oro puro	Camila Aristiguieta Lynch	Supporting Role
1993-1994	Dulce Ilusión	Alicia Reverón Anzola	Supporting Role
1992	Por estas calles	Natalia Pulselles	Supporting Role
1992	Princesa	Marina Lezama	Main Antagonist
1991-1992	El Desprecio	Lucelly Linares Santamaría	Supporting Role
1990-1991	Natacha	Elvira	Main Antagonist
1989-1990	La pasión de Teresa	Peggy San Juan	Main Antagonist
1988-1989	Abigail	María Begoña Martínez / María Clara Martínez	Main Antagonist
1987-1988	Selva María	Carla Altamina	Main Antagonist
1986	Siempre hay un mañana		
1986	Su otro amor	Eucaris	
1985	La Brecha	Nadia	Main Role
1983	Bienvenida Esperanza	Yoselin Mendizabal	Supporting Role
1983	Leonela	Maribella Saavedra	Supporting Role
1982	De su misma sangre	Frida	Main Antagonist
1982	Kapricho S.A	Dominika	Main Antagonist
1982	La señorita Perdomo	Carmela Ponte	Main Antagonist
1981	Luz Marina	Verónica San Lucas	Main Antagonist

=== Film ===
Year	Title	Character
2018	La noche de las dos lunas	Letizia
2012	Azul y no tan rosa	Delirio del Río
1986	De mujer a mujer	
1986	Fiesta de cumpleaños	

Awards and achievements
Preceded by Tatiana Capote (Barinas)	Miss World Venezuela; 1980	Succeeded by Pilín León (Aragua)
