= Soñar no cuesta nada (TV series) =

- Genre: Telenovela
- Created by: Verónica Suárez
- Written by: Verónica Suárez; Omaira Rivero
- Directed by: Yaky Ortega; Tito Rojas
- Starring: Karyme Lozano; Cristian de la Fuente; Laura Zapata; Víctor Cámara; Mirela Mendoza
- Opening theme: Soñar no cuesta nada by A.5
- Country of origin: United States
- Original language: Spanish
- No. of episodes: 191

Production
- Producers: Peter Tinoco; Ana Teresa Arismendi; Arquímedes Rivero; Dulce Terán
- Production locations: Miami, Florida
- Running time: 45 minutes
- Production company: Venevisión

Original release
- Network: Venevisión; Univisión
- Release: May 23, 2005 – January 24, 2006

Related
- Olvidarte jamás

Soñar no cuesta nada (English title: Daydreaming, literally translated to "dreaming costs nothing") is a Miami-made telenovela written by Verónica Suárez and produced by Venevisión International in 2005. The telenovela lasted for 191 episodes and was distributed internationally by Venevisión International.

Karyme Lozano and Cristian de la Fuente starred as the protagonists, while Laura Zapata, Mirela Mendoza and Ariel López Padilla starred as the main antagonists.

== Synopsis ==
From penniless immigrant to millionaire heiress: Emilia Olivares undergoes this dramatic transformation not through an unexpected stroke of luck, but a scheme that traps her in a web of lies and deceit. What begins as a dream for a young woman becomes a situation that alters the course of her life.

As an illegal immigrant in the United States, Emilia has few options. In order to help support her family, she is forced to work as a maid. However, her situation does not prevent her from dreaming of a better life. Beautiful, sweet and noble in spirit, Emilia one day meets the man who could make her dreams come true: Felipe Reyes.

Intimidated by the fact that Felipe is very rich, and ashamed of her social standing, Emilia does not reveal her true identity, but rather becomes a mystery to the young man. After just a few dates, they fall in love but she decides to disappear from his life.

Fate will bring them face to face again when Emilia becomes entrapped in a complex lie. Coerced by her greedy mistress, Roberta Lizalde, Emilia assumes the identity of Roberta's stepdaughter, Andrea, who is confined to bed with a terminal illness. The reason is that Andrea's father, Roberta's deceased husband, made his daughter the only heir to a fortune with the condition that if she should die before her 24th birthday, everything will go to charity. Because Andrea has very little time left to live, Roberta needs someone to take Andrea's place and give her control of the inheritance, so she wickedly manipulates Emilia into doing it.

Now pretending to be Andrea, Emilia meets Felipe again, and the relationship they once shared is rekindles. But reality catches up with Emilia soon enough, as Felipe's jealous girlfriend, Monica, sets out to uncover her rival's deception, revealing Emilia's true identity. From this moment on, Emilia faces a series of events that lead her story to an unexpected ending.

== Cast ==
- Karyme Lozano as Emilia Olivares - in love with Felipe, daughter of Estela and Arturo, granddaughter of Castula, half-sister of Monica.
- Cristian de la Fuente as Felipe Reyes Retana - in love with Emilia, brother of Liliana, nephew of Jonas.
- Laura Zapata as Roberta Perez de Lizalde - main female villain, mother of Mauricio and Michelle, stepmother of Andrea, lover of Jonas, ends up in jail paying for all her crimes.
- Géraldine Bazán as Liliana Reyes Retana - sister of Felipe, in love with Luis, hates Monica.
- Víctor Cámara as Arturo Hernandez - father of Monica and Emilia, husband of Olivia, but in love with Estela.
- Marialejandra Martín as Olivia Hernandez - wife of Arturo, mother of Monica.
- Mirela Mendoza as Monica Hernandez † - second female villain, in love with Felipe, daughter of Olivia and Arturo, half-sister of Emilia, hates Emilia, raped by Jonas, dies burned when she is pushed by Roberta from a boat.
- Orlando Fundichely as Ricardo † - main male villain, son of Jonas, brother of Javier killed by police.
- Andrés García Jr as Luis - best friend of Felipe, boyfriend of Jasmine, widow of Andrea, later in love with Liliana.
- Olivia Collins as Estela Olivares † - mother of Emilia, daughter of Castula, in love with Arturo, killed by Monica.
- Ariel López Padilla as Jonas Reyes Retana - main male villain, uncle of Felipe and Liliana, lover of Roberta, father of Ricardo and Javier and Renata's baby, goes to jail.
- Graciela Doring as Castula Alvarez - mother of Estela, grandmother of Emilia, first villain, later good.
- Joemy Blanco as Lucy - best friend of Emilia, suspect of Mauricio's murder, in love with Ernesto.
- Susan Vohn as Michelle - daughter of Roberta, sister of Maruricio, in love with Bobby.
- Rodrigo Mejia as Mauricio † - villain, later good, son of Roberta, brother of Michelle , killed by Roberta accidentally.
- Arap Bethke as Bobby - roommate of Rodrigo, in love with Michelle.
- Tatiana Capote as Matilde - mother of Andrea, hates Roberta.
- Jessica Cerezo as Jazmin - best friend of Monica, in love with Luis.
- Carmen Daisy Rodriguez as Andrea Lizalde † - daughter of Matilde, friend of Emilia, wife of Luis , died from illness.
- Adrian Mas as Rodrigo - roommate of Bobby, in love with Renata.
- Carlos Cuervo as Jose - in love with Emilia, friend of Lucy, Bobby and Rodrigo.
- Omar Avila as Javier - son of Jonas, brother of Ricardo, obsessed with Lucy.
- Carlos Cruz as Dr. Zabaleta † - doctor, Killed by Roberta.
- Ivelin Giro as Renata - lover of Jonas, mother of Jonas's children, later in love with Rodrigo.
- Nelida Ponce as Nana Dolores - worker at the Hernandez mansion.
- Mariana Huerdo as Carmela - worker at the Hernandez mansion.
- Julio Capote as Pedro - best friend of Arturo.
- Jorge Luis Pila as Ernesto - police officer, in love with Lucy.
- Hilda Luna as La Kikis - an ugly rich girl who loves Mauricio.
- Ilse Pappe as Maite - secretary of Felipe.
- Taniusha Capote as Lety - friend of Lililan and Jenny.
- Marina Vidal as Sarita - secretary of Jonás.
- Ximena Duque as Jenny - friend of Liliana and Lety.
- Angie Russian as Patty - secretary of Felipe.

== Theme song ==
There are 2 theme songs for this telenovela: one is called "Soñar No Cuesta Nada", performed by the main star Karyme Lozano and it can be heard only in Spanish-speaking markets (it's the opening theme song). There's also another song performed by Venezuelan boy-band A.5, the song is also called "Soñar No Cuesta Nada", but it has different lyrics to the Karyme Lozano's version, and it's only heard in non-Spanish speaking markets.
