= Nancy González (actress) =

Venezuelan actress (1952–2024)

- Born: 1952; Venezuela
- Died: 14 February 2024 (aged 71–72); Venezuela
- Occupation: Actress
- Employer: RCTV

Nancy González (1952-14 February 2024) was a Venezuelan actress. She worked for more than twenty-five years at the RCTV television channel.

== Biography ==
She worked for more than twenty-five years at the RCTV television channel, and lived on a pension granted by the Venezuelan government. She died on 14 February 2024 at the age of 71.

== Filmography ==
- 1972, Sacrificio de Mujer
- 1978, Orgullo y prejuicio
- 1979, Ídolos rotos
- 1979, El mundo de Bertha
- 1980, La Sultana
- 1981, Luisana mía
- 1982, El fantasma de la otra
- 1983, Marisela
- 1984, Maite
- 1984, Acusada
- 1986, Atrévete
- 1990, Maria María
- 1990, La mujer prohibilda
- 1991, Bellísima
- 1994, Morena clara
- 1999, Isabella mujer enamorada
- 1999, Toda mujer
- 2015, Guerreras y centauros
