= Carmen, la que contaba 16 años =

- Film poster
- Directed by: Román Chalbaud
- Release date: 1978
- Country: Venezuela
- Language: Spanish

Carmen, la que contaba 16 años (English: Carmen, who was 16) is a 1978 Venezuelan film and the sixth film directed by Román Chalbaud. It was shot in La Guaira, Venezuela, and based on a Prosper Mérimée novel.

== Cast ==
- Rafael Briceño
- Arturo Calderón
- Victor Cuica
- María Antonieta Gómez
- Miguel Ángel Landa
- Mayra Alejandra
- Bertha Moncayo
- Balmore Moreno
- William Moreno
- José Rodríguez
- Nancy Soto
