= Sangre azul =

- Genre: Telenovela
- Created by: José Ignacio Cabrujas
- Written by: José Ignacio Cabrujas; Julio César Mármol
- Directed by: César Bolívar
- Starring: Pierina España; José Luis Rodríguez; Jean Carlo Simancas; Carmen Julia Álvarez
- Country of origin: Venezuela
- Original language: Spanish
- No. of episodes: 56

Production
- Production company: RCTV

Original release
- Network: Radio Caracas Television
- Release: March 5 – May 13, 1979

Sangre azul is a Venezuelan telenovela developed by José Ignacio Cabrujas and Julio César Mármol and produced by Radio Caracas Television in 1979.

Pierina España, José Luis Rodríguez, Jean Carlo Simancas and Carmen Julia Álvarez starred as the protagonists.

== Plot ==
Sangre azul is set in mid 19th century Venezuela where a civil war is ongoing. Mariana, the beautiful eldest daughter of the Marquess of Granados, lives her life full of fun and flirtations, until the arrival of Alvaro who she feels attracted to and plans of marrying. But her sister María de los Ángeles also falls in love with him. Although she has a noble heart, Mariana is frowned by her high society for her frivolous behaviour and her need to always be the centre of attention for men. Jose Antonio, a military man, becomes captured by Mariana's personality, and although she begins having feelings for him, she is still in love with Alvaro. Out of pity, Jose Antonio marries Maria Teresa, a simple and fragile girl.

Later, tragedy strikes Mariana's family after her mother dies and her father is left in financial ruin. Mariana changes to become a responsible, strong woman as she works towards keeping her family's hacienda afloat, though she is still in love with Jose Antonio even though he is still married to Maria Teresa, while Alvaro works constantly to place doubt in Jose Antonio's mind about Mariana's love for him. Maria Teresa dies while giving birth, and before she asks Mariana to take care of her son and husband. Mariana and Jose Antonio then end up together happily married.

== Cast ==
- Pierina España as Mariana Granados
- José Luis Rodríguez as José Antonio
- Jean Carlo Simancas as Armando Belmonte
- Carmen Julia Álvarez as María Teresa
- Maria Teresa Acosta as Juana Bautista
- Grecia Colmenares as María de los Ángeles
- Zulay García as Leonor
- Tomás Henríquez as Padre Melardo
- Agustina Martín as Adelaida
- Hugo Pimentel as Marqués de Granados
- Arturo Calderón as Cuaima
- Julio Bernal as Juan Pablo
- Pedro Durán as Sebastián
