= Ka Ina =

- Genre: Telenovela; Romance; Drama
- Created by: César Miguel Rondón
- Written by: César Miguel Rondón; Ricardo García; Henry Herrera; Abigaíl Truchess; Luis Zelkowicz
- Directed by: Carlos Izquierdo
- Starring: Viviana Gibelli; Jean Carlo Simancas; Hilda Abrahamz
- Theme music composer: Juan Pichardo
- Opening theme: "Ojos Malignos" (slower version) by Soledad Bravo
- Ending theme: "Ojos Malignos" by Soledad Bravo
- Country of origin: Venezuela
- Original language: Spanish
- No. of episodes: 164

Production
- Executive producer: Henry Ramos
- Producer: Consuelo Delgado
- Camera setup: Multicamera
- Running time: 41-44 minutes
- Production company: Venevisión

Original release
- Network: Venevisión
- Release: January 18 – August 15, 1995

Ka Ina is a Venezuelan telenovela written by César Miguel Rondón and produced by Venevisión in 1995. This telenovela lasted 164 episodes and was distributed internationally by Venevisión International. It was also broadcast in multiple countries, such as the Philippines, United States, Argentina, Spain, among others.

Viviana Gibelli and Jean Carlo Simancas starred as the main protagonists with Hilda Abrahamz as the antagonist. The series is the reunion of Viviana Gibelli & Jean Carlo Simancas after they worked in Por Amarte Tanto in 1993.

Ka Ina means: the whole earth, the earth itself.

== Synopsis ==
Ka Ina tells the story of two women linked by superstition, magic, and their relationship with one man. Catalina Miranda is an engineer educated in Europe; Maniña Yerichana is a jungle priestess born to a Dutch gold digger and a Yanomami woman. Catalina and Maniña become rivals over Ricardo Leon, a man from the capital city. Although they appear to be the same age, Maniña and Catalina are mother and daughter, a fact that is not widely known. The story incorporates elements of folklore and legends.

== Cast ==
=== Main ===
- Jean Carlo Simancas as Ricardo Leon/El Chalanero
- Viviana Gibelli as Catalina Miranda Funkhütten/Amanaduna
- Hilda Abrahamz as Maniña Yerichana
- Julio Alcazar as Dagoberto Miranda
- Cristina Reyes as Mireya Carvajal #1
- Fedra López as Mireya Carvajal #2
- Aroldo Betancourt as Cruz de Jesus/Padre Gamboa

=== Supporting cast ===
- Juan Manuel Montesinos as Fernando Larrazabal
- Eva Moreno as Tibisay
- Alberto Marin as Medardo Garañon
- Ramon Hinojosa as Justiniano Garcia
- Elisa Escamez as Ingracia Camacho
- Jose Torres as Tacupay
- Jose Vieira as Antonio Larrazabal
- Wilmer Machado as Benito
- Marisela Buitrago as Lola Lopez
- Raul Medina as Cabo Prudencio Reyes
- Umberto Buonocuore as Gaetano di Fillipo
- Yolanda Muñoz as Vicenta
- Ivette Dominguez as Deisy Rodriguez
- Geronimo Gomez as Abel Negron
- Maria Eugenia Perera as Janet
- Isabel Herrera as Pauchi
- Elena Dinisio as Ingrid
- Zoe Bolivar as Josefa Restrepo
- Carmelo Lápira as Jairo Pastrana
- Miguel David Díaz as Misael
- Lucas Atilano as Washington David Negron (Abel Negron's son)
- Sebastian Atilano as Jefferson José Negron (Abel Negron's son and Washington's brother)
- Ledimar Sifuentes as Luz Clarita Camacho
- Julio Pereira as Dr. Francisco

== International Broadcast ==
This was the only Hispanic telenovela dubbed in English & Cebuano version in the Philippines, broadcast by Citynet Television (now named GTV) & GMA Cebu and Davao. In Citynet, it was dubbed in English through the trends of playing Japanese sci-fi TV series dubbed in English. After Ka Ina ended in Citynet as the first English-dubbed Hispanic telenovela in the said country, Citynet never borrowed any telenovela to be dubbed in English.
