= De mujeres =

- Genre: Telenovela
- Created by: Isamar Hernández
- Written by: Isamar Hernández; Freddy S. Hernández; Claudia Venturini
- Directed by: Gabriel Walfenzao
- Starring: Mimí Lazo; Carlos Olivier; Victoria Roberts; Carlos Cámara Jr. Carolina Perpetuo; Adolfo Cubas
- Opening theme: "Tengo corazón" by Sergio Pérez
- Country of origin: Venezuela
- Original language: Spanish
- No. of episodes: 164

Production
- Executive producer: Genaro Escobar
- Producer: Hernando Faría
- Production location: Caracas
- Production company: RCTV

Original release
- Network: RCTV
- Release: 21 May 1990 – 15 January 1991

De mujeres is a Venezuelan telenovela written by Isamar Hernández and produced by Radio Caracas Television in 1990.

Mimí Lazo and Carlos Olivier starred as the protagonists.

== Plot ==
The three Marcano sisters have to navigate their way through life while fighting a macho world, to achieve their own goals and live more balanced, independent lives.

Antonieta is a mother of two children and the dedicated wife to Luis Fernando, a womanizer whose infidelities are discovered after 17 years of marriage. Antonieta decides to ask for a divorce, but the issue becomes complicated with the family's economic problems and other pressures.

Adela is a very strong but suspicious woman with a husband, Enrique, who hides a past that is uncovered on their wedding day.

Aurora, the youngest sister, works as a journalist but has great fear of men and intimacy. She develops a relationship with Luis Fernando's brother Fucho.

The series is notable for including, somewhat unusually for the time, a gay-themed subplot involving Enrique's brother Tulio.

== Cast ==
- Mimí Lazo as Antonieta Marcano
- Carlos Olivier as Luis Fernando
- Victoria Roberts as Adela Marcano
- Carlos Cámara Jr. as Enrique
- Carolina Perpetuo as Aurora Marcano
- Adolfo Cubas as Fucho
- Néstor Maldonado as Gregorio
- Petite Kutlesa as Lupita
- Carlos José Cámara as Tito
- Rosario Prieto as Leticia
- Carlos Márquez as Don Pedro
- Marcos Campos as Octavio
- Rosita Vásquez as Hortencia
- Yajaira Broccolo as Marcela
- Yajaira Broccolo as Marcela
- Félix Loreto as Carlos Alfaro
- Olga Rojas as Viuda de Marcano
- Ileana Jacket as Federica
- Franklin Virgüez as Santiago
- Karl Hoffman as Tulio
- Luis Enrique Cañas as David
- Francis Romero as Ingrid
- Inés María Calero as Dulce María
- Crisol Carabal as Socorro Montes
- Leonardo Oliva as Don Manuel Baptista
- Arístides Aguiar as Alejandro
- Zulema González as Elenita
