= La revancha (1989 TV series) =

- Genre: Telenovela; Romance; Drama
- Created by: Mariela Romero
- Directed by: Reinaldo Lancaster; Arquimedes Rivero
- Starring: Rosalinda Serfaty; Jean Carlo Simancas; Abril Mendez; Daniel Alvarado
- Theme music composer: Rudy La Scala
- Opening theme: "Tesoro Mio" by Guillermo Dávila and Kiara
- Ending theme: "Amnesia" by José José
- Country of origin: Venezuela
- Original language: Spanish
- No. of episodes: 247

Production
- Executive producer: Carlos Suarez
- Producer: Militza Barrios
- Production company: Venevisión

Original release
- Network: Venevisión
- Release: April 1, 1989 – January 11, 1990

Related
- La revancha (2000)

La revancha (English title: The Revenge) is a Venezuelan telenovela written by Mariela Romero and produced by Venevisión in 1989. This telenovela lasted 247 episodes and was distributed internationally by Venevisión International.

Rosalinda Serfaty and Jean Carlo Simancas starred as the main protagonists.

== Synopsis ==
Fernando Maldonado, a powerful man involved in foul business kills Leonidas Torrealba, the owner of a neighboring farm in order to take over his property. Dolores, Mr. Torrealba's maid, is witness to the crime and runs away with Torrealbas two little girls, Mariana and Martha, but in her hectic crime scene getaway, Martha falls in a ravine and is left behind.

Twenty years later, Isamar Medina, Mariana's adopted name, one of Torrealba's lost daughters, has grown to become quite a beautiful young woman and a popular and friendly figure around the little town where her real father had his land savagely stolen from by Fernando Maldonado. For her own protection her adoptive parents have not revealed her true identity. Twenty years later, Isamar falls in love with Alejandro, a rich man who brings her much happiness. Her love for him is halted when she learns that he is Fernando Maldonado's son.

Meanwhile, Martha has reappeared. She is a young, wealthy woman who wants to find her little sister after 20 years and get even with those who murdered her father. Martha and Isamar will become rivals for the love of the same man, Alejandro. In its climactic moments, the girls discover their sibling relationship and unite to avenge the death of their father. As love always comes out victorious, Isamar and Alejandro get together and overcome their tragic past to give way to a lasting future.

== Cast ==
- Rosalinda Serfaty as Isamar Medina/Mariana Torrealba
- Jean Carlo Simancas as Alejandro Maldonado
- Abril Mendez as Martha Aguirre/Martha Torrealba
- Daniel Alvarado as Reinaldo Maldonado
- Carmen Julia Álvarez as Elisenda de Maldonado
- Rafael Briceño as Padre Zacarías Peralta
- Orangel Delfin as Fernando Maldonado
- Chelo Rodriguez as Aurora Huscategui de Maldonado
- Sandra Bruzzon as Daniela Vilarde
- Yanis Chimaras as José Luis Alvarado
- Agustina Martín as Carmen de Alvarado
- Francisco Ferrari as José Ramón Alvarado
- Reinaldo Lancaster as Leónidas Torrealba
- Sandra Juhasz as Mercedes Ferreira
- Yadira Casanova as Estefanía de Arroyo
- Javier Díaz as Samuel Aguirre
- Andreina Sánchez as Gabriela Santana
- Simón Pestana as Argenis Falcón
- Miguel de León as Leonardo Manrique
- Esperanza Magaz as Providencia Medina
- Rafael Romero as Anselmo Colmenares
- Luis Gerardo Nuñez as Julio Cesar
- Daniela Alvarado as Gabriela Santana
- Judith Vasquez as Sandra Castillo
- Luis Pérez Pons as Comisario Vielma
- Richard Rey as Detective Azuaje
- Flor Bermudez as Isabel Hernández

== Version ==
In 2000 Venevisión made a remake of the 1989 telenovela with the same name. Protagonists are Danna García, Jorge Reyes and Marcela Pezet.
