= Bienvenida Esperanza =

- Genre: Telenovela
- Created by: Fausto Verdial
- Written by: José Simón Escalona; Marian Escalona
- Directed by: Renato Gutiérrez
- Starring: Mayra Alejandra; Carlos Olivier; Félix Loreto; Tatiana Capote
- Opening theme: Marea de la mar performed by Ilan Chester
- Country of origin: Venezuela
- Original language: Spanish
- No. of episodes: 55

Production
- Executive producer: Henry Márquez
- Production location: Caracas
- Production company: RCTV

Original release
- Network: RCTV
- Release: May 1 – July 22, 1983

Bienvenida Esperanza is a Venezuelan telenovela developed by Fausto Verdial and produced by Radio Caracas Televisión in 1983. This telenovela lasted 55 episodes and was distributed internationally by Coral International.

Mayra Alejandra and Carlos Olivier starred as the main protagonists.

== Synopsis ==
Esperanza is a middle-class girl whose family makes a fortune on the racetrack. Esperanza meets José María, the son of a rich merchant, and they fall in love. He is already engaged, and, when faced with a choice, he decides to marry his fiancé, leaving Esperanza disillusioned and pregnant. Her father throws her out of the house, but Jacinto, who grew up with her, proposes to marry her and raise the child as his own. She accepts.

Meanwhile, José María's marriage is over, and he tries to go back to Esperanza and their son. When she does not immediately reject him, Jacinto becomes cold and harsh towards her and only then does Esperanza begins to love him.

== Cast ==
- Mayra Alejandra as Esperanza Acuña
- Carlos Olivier as Jacinto Nuñez
- Felix Loreto as Julio Mendizábal
- Tatiana Capote as Mariana Trías
- Yanis Chimaras as Gabriel Iñesta
- Flavio Caballero as José María Delgado
- Hilda Abrahamz as Yoselin Mendizábal
- Hazel Leal as Anaminta Acuña
- Julio Alcázar - Eleazar Vargas
- Ernesto Balzi as Johnny
- Víctor Cámara as Gerardo Aparicio
- Carlos Márquez as Justo Mendizábal
- Aroldo Betancourt as Iván
- Amalia Pérez Díaz as Amanda
- Elba Escobar as Zoraida de García
- Gladys Caceres as Teodora Mendizábal
- América Barrios as Mercedes de Trias
- Hazel Leal as Anaminta
- Mahuampi Acosta as Remedios Aparicio
- Alberto Marín as Tomás Acuña
- Dilia Waikarán as Emilia de Acuña
- Alicia Plaza as Meliza Acuña
- Leopoldo Regnault as Alejandro
- Yajaira Paredes as Eloísa "Viki"
- Carlos Villamizar as Joaquín Robles
