= La mujer prohibida (1991 TV series) =

- Genre: Telenovela; Romance; Drama
- Created by: Manuel Muñoz Rico
- Written by: Alberto Gómez
- Directed by: Gabriel Walfenzao
- Starring: Andrés García; Mayra Alejandra; Fernando Carrillo; Tatiana Capote
- Opening theme: "La mujer prohibida" by Guillermo Davila
- Countries of origin: Venezuela; Spain
- Original language: Spanish
- No. of episodes: 227

Production
- Executive producer: Arnaldo Limansky
- Cinematography: Tom Fernandez
- Running time: 41-44 minutes
- Production companies: Venevisión; Telecinco

Original release
- Network: Venevisión; Telecinco
- Release: June 18, 1991 – March 31, 1992

Related
- Emperatriz; Las dos Dianas

La mujer prohibida is a 1991 Venezuelan telenovela produced by Venevisión and Telecinco. The story was written by Manuel Muñoz Rico and adapted for the screen by Alberto Gómez. The series stars Andrés García, Mayra Alejandra, Fernando Carrillo and Tatiana Capote.

== Plot ==
Irene Rivas, a 26-year-old mute woman, is forced to marry the ruthless Germán Gallardo in order to save her father from prison. However, Irene is in love with Carlos Luis, Germán's son. Irene tries to find happiness, but discovers many secrets from the past that could destroy her future forever.

== Cast ==
- Andrés García- Germán Gallardo
- Mayra Alejandra- Irene Rivas
- Tatiana Capote- Yarima Báez de Gallardo
- Fernando Carrillo- Carlos Luis Gallardo
- Henry Galue- Diego Ley
- Abril Méndez- Rosalinda Pacheco
- Miguel Alcántara- Alberto Moncada
- Concha Rosales- Pilar Martínez
- Liliana Durán- Flora
- Marita Capote
- Marisela Buitriago
- Nancy González
- Angelica Arenas
- Francisco Ferrari- Jesus Rivas
- Andrés Magdaleno-
- Alberto Marín- Toneco
- Eva Mondolfi-
- Ramón Hinojosa
- Manuel Carrillo- Álvaro Ley
- Carolina Cristancho- Rosalinda Pacheco
- Gonzalo Velutini-
- Chumico Romero- Lázaro
- María Elena Coello
- Gerardo Marrero
- Laura Zerpa
- Isabel Hungría
- Lucy Orta
- Juan Galeno
- Israel Maranatha
- Miguel David Díaz
- Bárbara Mosquera- Peluca
- Marta Carbillo
- Jimmy Verdum
- Ana Massimo
- Adela Romero
- Carolina Muzziotti
- Hans Schiffer- Guavino
- Wilmer Ramírez- Chucho
- Iñaqui Guevara
- Angélica Castro
- David Bermudez- Acido
- Lisbeth López
- María Antonieta Avallone- Milagrito
- Joel de la Rosa- Matías
- Giovanni Duran
- Carmen Julia Alvarez- Estella di Salvatorri
- Zoe Ducós- fiorella di Salvatorri
- Daniela Alvarado- Martica Gallardo
- María de Lourdes Devonish
- Ana Martínez
- Juan Carlos Vivas- Daniel
- Elizabeth López- Ivonne
- Henry Salvat
