= Fedra López =

Argentine actress and model (born 1965)

- Born: Fedra María Fernanda López Bernini; June 5, 1965 (age 60); Buenos Aires, Argentina
- Occupation: Actress

Fedra López (Spanish pronunciation: [ˈfeðɾa ˈlopes]; born June 5, 1965) is an Argentine actress and model.

Fedra was born in Buenos Aires, Argentina but raised up in Venezuela. She began her career at the age of 14 with Juan Carlos y su rumba flamenca. During a tour of Venezuela with her step-father, Fedra decided to stay in the country.

She has two children: a daughter Bebsabe and son Eros.

== Filmography ==
- Natalia del Mar (2011) as Sara Morales vda. de Uzcategui (villain)
- El Desprecio as Pastora Lara Portillo (villain)
- Ser Bonita No Basta (2005) as Soledad Olavarría (villain)
- La invasora (2003) as María Teresa Aldana
- La mujer de Judas (2002) as Ricarda Araújo
- Felina (2001) as Mara
- Hechizo de Amor (2000) as Natasha
- Cuando Hay Pasion (1999) as Inés de Jesús Leal (protagonist)
- Aguamarina (1997)
- La Primera Vez (1997)
- Quirpa de Tres Mujeres (1996) as Manuela Echeverría Salazar (protagonist)
- Sol de Tentación (1996) as Katiuska
- Ka Ina (1995) as Mireya Carvajal
- María Celeste (1993) as Irania Paniagua (villain)
- Rosangelica (1993) as Marielba
- Por Amarte Tanto (1993)
- Inocencia mortal (1988)
