= La revancha (2000 TV series) =

- Genre: Telenovela; Romance
- Based on: La revancha by Mariela Romero
- Written by: Mariela Romero
- Directed by: Pepe Sánchez; Yaky Ortega
- Starring: Danna García; Jorge Reyes; Marcela Pezet; Jorge Aravena; Jorge Martinez; Elluz Peraza; Maritza Rodríguez
- Opening theme: "Vuelve junto a mi" sung by Pablo Montero
- Ending theme: "Vuelve junto a mi" by Pablo Montero
- Countries of origin: Venezuela; United States
- Original language: Spanish
- No. of episodes: 151

Production
- Executive producers: Alfredo Schwarz; Arquímedes Rivero
- Production locations: Miami, Florida
- Running time: 42-45 minutes
- Production companies: Venevisión; Fonovideo

Original release
- Network: Venevisión
- Release: January 1 – July 1, 2000

Related
- María Rosa, búscame una esposa; La revancha (original series)

La revancha (English title: The Revenge) is a telenovela produced by Venevisión and Fonovideo and filmed in Miami, Florida, in 2000. It is a remake of the 1989 telenovela of the same name written by Mariela Romero. The telenovela lasted for 151 episodes and was distributed internationally by Venevisión International.

Danna García and Jorge Reyes starred as the main protagonists while Marcela Pezet, Jorge Aravena and Jorge Martinez starred as antagonists.

== Plot ==
Arístides Ruiz and Rodrigo Arciniegas were business partners, but when Arístides discovered his partner was dealing in illegal businesses behind his back, Rodrigo killed him before he could report him. The two daughters of Arístides, Isabella and the little Mariana, become separated after the nanny who witnesses the crime, runs off with little Mariana.

Years later, Mariana who is now called Soledad, has been raised up by her nanny who she believes to be her real mother. On the other hand, Isabella has grown up under the care of her god-father surrounded by luxuries and comforts, making her proud and selfish. But she still remembers the crime committed against her father and vows to find her sister and get revenge on Rodrigo Arciniegas.

However, fate will cause these two sisters to meet again, but in an unfavorable way since they will become enemies vying for the affections of the same man they fall in love with, Alejandro Arciniegas, the son of the man who killed their father.

== Cast ==
=== Main cast ===
- Danna García as Mariana Ruiz / Soledad Santander
- Jorge Reyes as Alejandro Arciniegas
- Marcela Pezet as Isabela Ruiz. Villain, later turns good, when she realized that Soledad is her sister. Wants to revenge on Rodrigo, because he killed their father, Aristides
- Jorge Aravena as Reinaldo Arciniegas. Villain, accomplice in murders, tries to kill Jose Luis, tries to rap Soledad. Died in the end of the story by gunshots he took in place of the love of his life Mercedita
- Jorge Martinez as Rodrigo Arciniegas. Main villain. Killed Aristides. Goes crazy. Sailors out to the sea and dies.
- Elluz Peraza as Emperatriz vda. de Azcárraga. Villain, hates Isabella, but turns good in the end of the story.
- Maritza Rodriguez as Mercedes Riverol
- Henry Zakka as Oscar Riverol. Villain, later good. Arrested by the police from complicity in murders of Rodrigo.
- Patricia Alvarez as Lola Cienfuegos
- Alberto Mayagoitia as Leonardo Manrique
- Vicente Tepedino as Jose Luis Hernandez

=== Secondary Cast ===
- Raquel Bustos as Rosarito
- Juan Carlos Gutierez as Sabas
- Norma Zúñiga as Providencia Santander
- Ninel Conde as Reina Azcarraga. Villain.
- Orlando Casin as Santiago
- Claudia Reyes as Brenda. Villain, later good.
- Yadira Santana as Bernarda Rondon
- Diana Quijano as Lucia Arciniegas
- Felix Manrique as Kike Arciniegas
- Lino Martone as Gulliermo Arciniegas
- Olimpia Maldonado as Lupe
- Rosa Felipe as Doña Rosa
- Martha Mijares as Romelia Hernández
- Rosalinda Rodriguez-Tula
- Omar Moynelo as Alvaro del Rosal
- Tatiana Capote as Sandra Castillo
- Yoli Dominguez as Fanny
- Monica Rubio as Carolina Reyes
- Andres Gutierrez as Carlos Alberto Mendez
