= Tatiana Capote =

Cuban-Venezuelan actress

- Born: Tatiana Capote Abdel; August 15, 1962 (age 64); Havana, Cuba
- Height: 1.72 m (5 ft 8 in)
- Beauty pageant titleholder
- Title: Miss World Venezuela 1979
- Hair color: Brown
- Eye color: Brown
- Major competitions: Miss Venezuela 1979 (1st runner-up) (Miss World Venezuela); Miss World 1979

Tatiana Capote Abdel (born August 15, 1962 in Havana, Cuba) is a Cuban-Venezuelan actress and beauty pageant titleholder.

== Miss World ==
She grew up in Caracas, Venezuela and became the representative of Venezuela to the 1979 Miss World pageant held in London, United Kingdom on November 15, 1979. When competing at Miss World 1979, Capote popped out of her swimsuit during a preview of the final judging. Pageant organizer Eric Morley hastily adjusted her swimsuit.

== Filmography ==
Show	Year	Type	Role	Production company
Corazón Valiente	2012	TV series	Ofelia Ramirez	Telemundo
Sacrificio de Mujer	2011	TV series	Lorena Camargo	Venevision
Si me miran tus ojos	2009	TV series	Amparito	Venevision & Sony Pictures TV
Mi Vida Eres Tu	2006	TV series	Susana	Venevision
El desprecio	2006	TV series	-	RCTV
Soñar no Cuesta Nada	2005	TV series	Matilde	Venevision
Rebeca	2003	TV series	Marcela / Amanda	Venevision
La Revancha	2000	TV series	Sandra Castillo	Venevision & Fonovideo
Cuando Hay Pasion	1999	TV series	Flavia de Malave	Venevision
Destino de mujer	1997	TV series	Giselda	Venevision & Televisión Española
Llovizna	1997	TV series	-	Venevision
La Mujer Prohibida	1991	TV series	Yarima	Venevision & Televisión Española
La Revancha	1989	TV series	-	Venevision
Maribel	1989	TV series	Maribel	Venevision
Adriana	1985	TV series	-	Venevision
Rebeca	1985	TV series	Rebeca	Venevision
Adios Miami	1984	Movie	-	-
Reten de Catia	1984	-	-	-
Marisela	1984	TV series	Marisela	Venevision
Marta y Javier	1983	TV series	Julia Martinez	RCTV
Bienvenida Esperanza	1983	TV series	Marina	RCTV
Kapricho S.A.	1982	TV series	-	-
Luz Marina	1981	TV series	Dorada Alegria	-
Natalia de 8 a 9	1980	TV series	-	RCTV
Raquel	1973	TV series	Linda	RCTV
La Doña	1972	TV series	-	RCTV
Barbara	1971	TV series	Elisita	RCTV

Awards and achievements
Preceded by Patricia Tóffoli	Miss World Venezuela; 1979	Succeeded by Hilda Abrahamz
