= Miss Venezuela 1979 =

26th edition of the Miss Venezuela competition

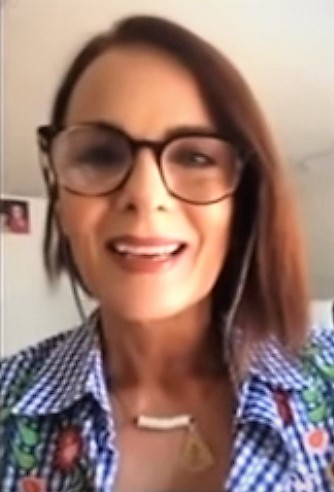
- Date: May 17, 1979
- Presenters: Gilberto Correa; Liana Cortijo
- Venue: Caracas Hilton Hotel, Caracas
- Broadcaster: Venevision
- Entrants: 16
- Placements: 5
- Winner: Maritza Sayalero; Departamento Vargas

Miss Venezuela 1979 was the 26th edition of Miss Venezuela pageant held at Caracas Hilton Hotel in Caracas, Venezuela, on May 17, 1979, after weeks of events. The winner of the pageant was Maritza Sayalero, Miss Departamento Vargas.

The pageant was broadcast on Venevision from the Caracas Hilton Hotel in Caracas, Venezuela and was the first Miss Venezuela broadcast in color. At the conclusion of the final night of competition, outgoing titleholder Marisol Alfonzo, crowned Maritza Sayalero of Departamento Vargas as the new Miss Venezuela. She would be crowned Miss Universe the same year.

== Results ==
=== Placements ===
- Miss Venezuela 1979 - Maritza Sayalero (Miss Departamento Vargas)

The runners-up were:

- 1st runner-up - Tatiana Capote (Miss Barinas)
- 2nd runner-up - Maria Fernanda Ramírez (Miss Distrito Federal)(disqualified)
- 3rd runner-up - Nina Kors (Miss Portuguesa)
- 4th runner-up - Nilza Moronta (Miss Zulia)

=== Special awards ===
- Miss Photogenic (voted by press reporters) - Marisol Fernández (Miss Mérida)
- Miss Congeniality - Francia Pena (Miss Falcón)
- Miss Friendship - Nilza Moronta (Miss Zulia)

== Contestants ==
The Miss Venezuela 1979 delegates were:

- Miss Anzoátegui - Lucía Coromoto Martínez
- Miss Aragua - Marisela Buitrago Mora
- Miss Barinas - Tatiana Capote Abdel
- Miss Bolívar - Ayurami Margarita Estévez Ramírez
- Miss Carabobo - Carolina Kock Tovar
- Miss Departamento Vargas - Maritza Sayalero Fernández
- Miss Distrito Federal - Diana Maria Fernanda Ramírez (disqualified)
- Miss Falcón - Francia Venezuela Pena Toledo
- Miss Guárico - Doris Coromoto Rivero Jiménez
- Miss Mérida - Marisol Fernández Biñé
- Miss Miranda - Alida Elizabeth Bello Hernández
- Miss Nueva Esparta - Nydia Elizabeth Centeno Contreras
- Miss Portuguesa - Nina Korschunov Kondryn
- Miss Sucre - Diana Elizabeth Stanford Rodríguez
- Miss Trujillo - Jeannette Josefina Rodríguez Delgado
- Miss Zulia - Nirza Josefina -Nilza- Moronta Sangronis
