= José Luis Rodríguez (singer) =

Venezuelan singer

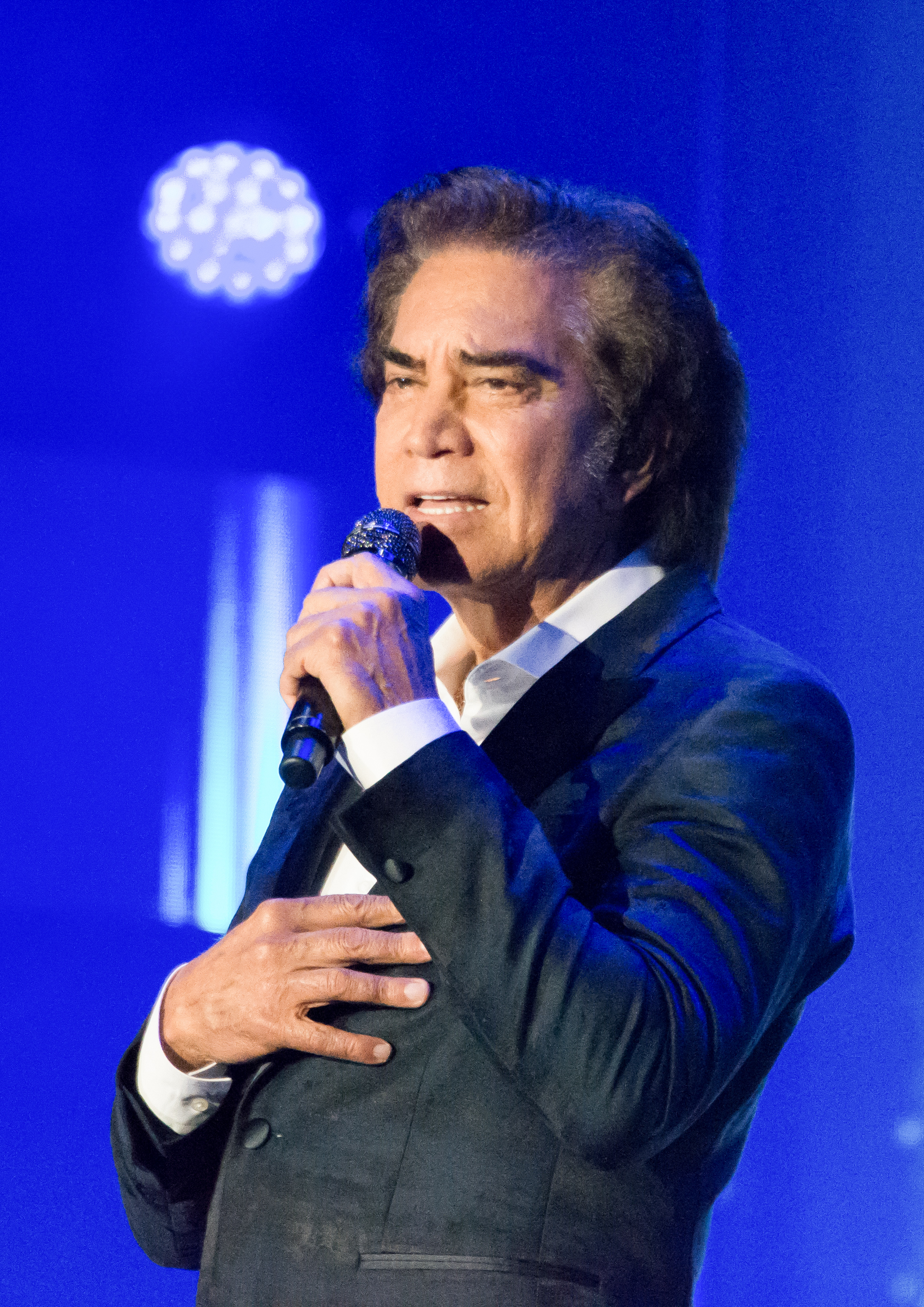
- Rodríguez in 2020

Background information
- Also known as: El Puma; El Capitán; El Grande
- Born: José Luis Rodríguez Gónzalez; 14 January 1943 (age 83); Caracas, Venezuela
- Genres: Canción melódica; Bolero; Latin pop
- Occupations: Singer; record producer; actor; entrepreneur
- Instrument: Voice
- Years active: 1961–present
- Labels: Velvet; TopHits; RCA; Polydor; Sony BMG
- Website: www.elpuma.com

José Luis Rodríguez González (Latin American Spanish pronunciation: [xoseˈlwis roˈðɾiɣes]; 14 January 1943), nicknamed El Puma ("The Puma"), is a Venezuelan singer and actor who is known for having recorded many international super hits and participated in a handful of telenovelas. He has also served as a coach and mentor on the Argentine, the Peruvian, and the Chilean versions of The Voice, as well as a judge on The X Factor Chile.

== Life and career ==
José Luis Rodríguez was born in Caracas, Venezuela to José Antonio Rodríguez from the Canary Islands, Spain and Ana González a Venezuelan housewife. He lost his father at the age of six, and was raised by his mother (an illiterate then, learned to read as an adult to read the Bible) along with 11 brothers and sisters. He grew up in very modest conditions, having to shine shoes, and pack bags in a supermarket for a living at an early age. Without an academic formation, he shaped himself as a singer and actor by empirical means.

As his mother participated in the revolt against Marcos Pérez Jiménez (holding weapons and hiding politicians in her home), Rodríguez lived in exile in Ecuador with her and his brother, for a couple of years.

In 1974, Rodriguez was selected by Venevision to represent Venezuela in the third edition of the prestigious OTI Festival which was held in the Mexican city of Acapulco. There, his entry, the song "Vuélvete" (Return) found a warm reception, therefore gaining recognition for his country by winning the third-place prize with 11 points.

Rodríguez surfaced in his homeland in the late 1960s and early 1970s, and was able to build a fan base there. He also participated in a famous commercial, along with his family during that time, for Ace detergents. Rodríguez went to Puerto Rico, where he participated in the Telenovela Cristina Bazán, alongside Johanna Rosaly and young Adamari López. It was there that he received his nickname, El Puma. Later, he also made the telenovela, El ídolo, with Cuban actress Marilyn Pupo, playing Omar Contreras (a.k.a. El Puma).

Rodríguez's main money revenue, however, was his singing career. His hits included Dueño de nada, Pavo real and Agárrense de las manos. With the second, he caused controversy at the 1982 contest of Miss Universe, which was being held in Lima, Peru; the song's main issue was interracial marriage.

Later, Rodríguez participated in the Latin American Spanish version of Meet the Robinsons, La Familia del Futuro, as Wilbur Robinson's father. El Puma also starred in an advertising campaign for Wrigley's Eclipse gum, with the spot drawing on his persona, using humor and kitsch to highlight the tagline, "Libera el Puma que hay en tí" (Free the puma within). Another commercial that drew on his puma persona during that era was one for Snickers chocolate bars.

In May 2009, Rodriguez joined the cast of the miniseries, Gabriel, produced for the Hispanic audience in the United States by Megafilms and transmitted by Mega TV. The miniseries, released in November of the same year is based on the themes of vampirism and occultism.

In July 2012, he was a judge and voice trainer on La Voz... Argentina (Argentine version of The Voice) that was broadcast on Telefe. Along with co-presenters Fernán Martínez and Carolina Ramírez, he served as a judge on a dance program called La Pista which was aired on Caracol TV in Colombia. In the same year he also made a cameo appearance in the film, Casa de mi Padre, starring Will Ferrell.

In August 2013, Rodríguez was part of the first season of La Voz Perú, where he was coach for one of the four teams. On 20 December, one of his pupils, young Daniel Lazo, placed first in the competition, making Rodríguez the first winning coach in the history of La Voz Perú.

In September 2013 in an interview with the Peruvian newspaper, La República, Rodríguez expressed that he would continue to perform music but cease to produce records because of piracy.

== Personal life ==
Rodríguez was married to Lila Morillo from 1966 to 1986. They are the parents of actresses Lilibeth Rodríguez and Liliana Rodríguez. Rodríguez fathered Génesis Rodríguez with Cuban-born model Carolina Pérez, whom he ultimately married in 1997.

== Health ==
He underwent a double lung transplant due to pulmonary fibrosis in December 2017.

== Select album discography ==
- 1963: 2 Sets Con Billo
- 1964: Billo En Colombia
- 1964: Billo En Santo Domingo
- 1964: Cantares De Navidad
- 1964: Billo En Puerto Rico
- 1965: El Yo-Yo
- 1965: Billo Y Su Música
- 1965: Fin de Año
- 1965: Mosaico 17
- 1966: La Renga
- 1966: Anoche no dormí
- 1966: De 1937 a 1966 Bailando con Billo
- 1966: Felices Fiestas
- 1967: Se necesitan dos
- 1974: Mi Fe
- 1975: Los Temas De Mis Telenovelas
- 1976: Una Nueva Canción
- 1977: Una Canción De España (TH/Top Hits)
- 1977: Jose Luis De América
- 1979: Voy A Perder La Cabeza
- 1980: Atrévete
- 1980: Cantando Éxitos De Siempre (Discos CBS International)
- 1982: La Historia Del Idolo
- 1982: Dueño De Nada
- 1983: Ven CBS Columbia
- 1984: Voy A Conquistarte (Discos CBS International)
- 1984: Due Come Noi (Discos CBS International)
- 1985: El Último Beso (Discos CBS International)
- 1987: Señor Corazón
- 1988: Con El Mariachi Vargas
- 1989: Tengo Derecho A Ser Feliz
- 1989: Las 15 Grandes De El Puma
- 1990: Serie De Colección
- 1990: 12 Grandes Éxitos
- 1990: Esta Vez
- 1990: Senora Bonita
- 1991: El Puma En Ritmo
- 1992: Piel de Hombre
- 1993: Querido Puma
- 1994: Razones Para Una Sonrisa
- 1995: Boleros De Siempre Con José Luis Rodríguez
- 1996: Llamada Del Amor
- 1996: Joyas Musicales
- 1996: Lo Mejor De José Luis Rodríguez
- 1997: Que Quiere Esa Musica Esta Noche
- 1997: Inólvidable
- 1999: En Ritmo 2: Fiesta
- 2000: Serie Millennium 21
- 2000: Mis 30 Mejores
- 2001: Inolvidable, Vol. 3
- 2002: Mis 30 Mejores Canciones Con Los Panchos
- 2002: Champagne
- 2002: Serie De Autores, Vol. 1: Manuel Alejandro
- 2002: Serie De Autores, Vol. 3: P. Herrero y J.L. Armenteros
- 2002: Serie De Autores, Vol. 4: Chema Purón
- 2002: Serie De Autores, Vol. 5: Chema Purón
- 2002: Mujer
- 2004: Mi Historia
- 2005: Distancia
- 2005: Sabor A México
- 2005: Mis 30 Mejores Canciones
- 2006: Canciones De Amor
- 2006: Ayer Y Hoy
- 2006: 15 Éxitos
- 2007: Trópico
- 2007: Homenaje a José Alfredo Jiménez
- 2008: Interpreta A Manuel Alejandro
- 2009: Los Grandes Del Amor
- 2009: Mi Amigo El Puma
- 2017: Inmenso

== Billboard Hot Latin Songs ==
- Y Tú También Llorarás (#1)
- Baila Mi Rumba (Ritmo de San Martín) (#1)
- Torero (con Julio Iglesias) (#1)
- Boca, Dulce Boca (#2)
- Sueño Contigo (#3)
- La Fiesta (#3)
- Esa Chica Me Vacila (#5)
- Rodando Caminos (#8)
- Señora Bonita (#10)
- No Me Quieras Tanto (con Los Panchos) (#12)
- Por Esa Mujer (#13)
- Esta Vez (#14)
- Se Me Hace Agüita la Boca (#18)
- Vale la Pena Volver (#18)
- Rayito de Luna (con Los Panchos) (#22)
- Si Pudiera (#29)
- Tengo Derecho a Ser Feliz (#29)
- De Punta a Punta (#34)
- Yo Quiero Ser Tu Amor (#35)
- Alguien Tiene Que Ceder (#40)
- Dame, Dame (#48)

== Telenovelas ==
- 1963: Cuentos para mayores
- 1966: Cantando nace el amor
- 1967: Donde no llega el sol
- 1967: Club musical
- 1967: El retrato de mamá
- 1968: Pent House
- 1969: Las golfas
- 1969: El roble
- 1970: La satánica
- 1970: El ciego
- 1970: Los Juniors
- 1971: La consentida de papá
- 1972: Indio
- 1972: Porque los hombres pecan
- 1972: Simplemente María
- 1972: Alma Rosa
- 1973: Chinita mi amor
- 1974: Una muchacha llamada Milagros as Omar Contreras "El Puma"
- 1975: Isabelita
- 1975: Señorita Elena
- 1975: Mamá
- 1976: Carolina
- 1977: Tormento
- 1977: La Hija de Juana Crespo
- 1978: Cristina Bazán
- 1978: Residencia de señoritas
- 1979: Sangre azul
- 1979: Estefania
- 1980: El Idolo
- 1985: Angelica
- 1986: Atrevete
- 1986: Mi encuentro con Teresa
- 1987: Sueño contigo
- 1992: Piel as Vicente
- 2007: Trópico as Guillermo Guzmán
- 2008: Gabriel, amor inmortal as Francisco Pizarro

== Reality shows ==
- 2024 - Mask Singer: Adivina quién canta 4 (Contestant as Avocado)
- 2024 - Top Chef VIP 3 (Contestant)
- 2022 - Canta Conmigo Ahora 1 (Judge)
- 2014 - La Voz Perú 2 (Judge)
- 2013 - La Voz Perú 1 (Judge)
- 2012 - La Voz Argentina 1 (Judge)

== See also ==
- List of best-selling Latin music artists
- Music of Venezuela (Musica Llanera)
