= Abril Méndez =

Venezuelan actress

Abril Méndez (Caracas, Venezuela, July 20, 1967) is a Venezuelan actress and producer. She has acted in Venezuelan telenovelas, including Inmensamente, Alba Marina, Niña Bonita, La Revancha and La Mujer Prohibída. She has been in Venezuelan and Latin American films, including A La salida nos vemos, Río Negro, Profundo, Un Domingo Feliz and Música.
