= Jean Carlo Simancas =

Venezuelan actor

Jean Carlos Simancas
- Born: Rafael Ignacio Briceño Simancas; July 17, 1949 (age 77); Maracaibo, Venezuela
- Occupation: Actor

Jean Carlos Simancas (born July 17, 1949 in Maracaibo) is a Venezuelan theater and television actor popular for his various roles in telenovelas.

== Biography ==
Simancas developed a passion for acting while he was studying drama in high school. After finishing high school, he continued with further drama studies at the University Theater of Zulia. After acting in several theater productions, simancas received his first starring role in 1977 in the telenovela titled Tormento.

== Telenovelas ==
- Valentina (1975) as Eduardo Lacoste
- Carolina (1976) as Ricardo Jimenez
- La hija de Juana Crespo (1977) as David
- Sangre azul (1979) as Álvaro
- Marielena (1981)
- Luz Marina (1981)
- Luisana Mia (1981) as Juan Miguel Bernal
- Qué pasó con Jacqueline? (1982)
- Claudia (1982)
- Amor gitano (1983) as Augusto
- Más allá del silencio (1985)
- Amor prohibido (1986) as Miguel Ángel
- Mi nombre es amor (1987) as Joaquín
- La Revancha (1989) as Alejandro
- Disparen a matar (1990) as Santiago
- Extraordinary Adventure of an Ordinary Papa (1990) as Domingo Villaverde
- Mundo de Fieras (1991) as José Manuel Bustamante
- Por Amarte Tanto (1993) as Luis Arturo
- Ka Ina (1995) as Ricardo León
- Todo Por Tu Amor (1997) as Samuel Montalbán
- Niña Mimada (1998) as Aurelio Echegaray
- El País de las mujeres (1999) as Fabián Aristimuño
- Toda Mujer (1999) as Marcelo Bustamante
- Rizo (1999) as Alejandro del Rey
- Mas que Amor... Frenesi (2001) as Orestes Lara
- La invasora (2003) as Ignacio Martínez Aguilar
- Negra consentida (2004) as Caetano Nascimento
- Amantes (2005) as Humberto Rivera
- Por todo lo alto (2006) as Ignacio Urquiaga
- Arroz con Leche (2007) as Fabio 'El Chef'
- ¿Vieja Yo? (2008) as ¿Vieja Yo?
- La mujer perfecta (2010) as Crúz Mario Polanco
- Válgame Dios (2012) as Innocente Castillo
- Corazón Esmeralda (2014) as César Augusto Salvatierra
