= Cuando hay pasión =

Television series

- Genre: Telenovela; Romance; Drama
- Created by: Inés Rodena
- Written by: Benilde Ávila
- Directed by: César Bolívar; Marcos Reyes Andrade; Claudio Callao
- Creative director: Arquímedes Rivero
- Starring: Fedra López; Jorge Reyes; Jaime Araque; Ana Karina Casanova; Tatiana Capote
- Opening theme: "Cuando hay pasión" by Chris Duran
- Country of origin: Venezuela
- Original language: Spanish
- No. of episodes: 145

Production
- Executive producer: Consuelo Delgado
- Producers: Carolina de Jacovo; Aimara Escobar
- Production location: Caracas
- Running time: 41-44 minutes
- Production company: Venevisión

Original release
- Network: Venevisión
- Release: 27 March – 29 October 1999

Cuando hay pasión (English title: When there is passion) is a Venezuela]n telenovela written by Benilde Ávila and produced by Venevisión in 1999. The series is based on the radionovela Valentina by Inés Rodena. This telenovela lasted 145 episodes and was distributed internationally by Venevisión International.

Fedra López and Jorge Reyes starred as the main protagonists.

== Synopsis ==
Two love stories that unfold against the backdrop of a bitter feud between two prominent families: The Nunezes and the Malaves. Co-owners of a successful record company, they have been partners for many years. After the death of Don Carlos Nunez and his wife in an automobile accident, their eldest son, Reinaldo, took over the family's business affairs. Since then, he has spoiled his three siblings-Luis Guillermo, Gabriela and Jean Paul-as well as his two daughters, Vicky and Jennifer, by giving them all the luxuries money can buy. But now they must face a terrible truth: while Reinaldo was away undergoing a medical check-up that revealed he is terminally ill, Armando Malave cheated the Nuсez family out of all their stock in the company. This fraud, added to their extravagant expenses, has left them penniless. To make matters worse, Malave's daughter, Daniela, abandons Luis Guillermo on their wedding night, after finding out that the Nuсez fortune is gone. Coerced by her father and her evil aunt Bertha, she never shows up for the ceremony, causing Luis Guillermo to become deeply depressed.

Faced with financial ruin and humiliation at the hands of the scheming Malaves, Reinaldo tries to figure out a way to keep his family from losing what little they have left. His only confidante is Ines Leal, a kind and loving young woman who grew up in the Nunez mansion and is now his daughter's tutor and nanny. Ines has been secretly in love with Luis Guillermo as long as she can remember, but he has never even noticed. Reinaldo, a widower, not knowing that Ines’ true love is his brother, asks her to marry him so that she will be legally in charge of the family when he dies. Convinced that winning Luis Guillermo's love is impossible, and out of loyalty to Reinaldo, Ines accepts.

Living at the Nuсez home is Diego Andres Anzola, their cousin. This brilliant young psychiatrist is engaged to Michelle, Armando Malave's youngest daughter-but he will find the love of his life in Marisela, a poor orphan whom he meets by chance, and who is taken in by the good-hearted Reinaldo when he learns that she is completely alone in the world. Surprisingly, it turns out that Marisela is the lost daughter of Flavia and Armando Malave - the daughter that Flavia has been mourning for the past 17 years. But many hardships will fall on Marisela before she can enjoy the social position she rightfully deserves...and before she and Diego Andres can find happiness together. After news of Reinaldo's death during surgery in the U.S., Ines is left with the difficult task of running the household and courageously facing the family's bitter resentment, including that of Luis Guillermo. However, Luis Guillermo eventually realizes that he has loved Ines all along; and just as she begins to see her lifelong dream come true, they receive a shocking surprise: Reinaldo's death was faked. He has been hiding all this time, planning his revenge on the family that brought shame and ruin to the Nuсez name: the Malaves. From that moment on, Diego Andres and Marisela, Ines and Luis Guillermo, will be caught in a whirlwind of intrigue, jealousy, ambition and dark secrets from the past - and will become key players in a series of unexpected events that will finally bring their stories to a riveting conclusion.

== Cast ==
=== Main cast ===
- Fedra López as Inés de Jesús Leal
- Jorge Reyes as Luis Guillermo Núñez Anzola
- Jaime Araque as Diego Andrés Anzola Miralle
- Ana Karina Casanova as Marisela Malavé Istúriz
- Carlos Olivier as Reinaldo Núñez Anzola / Piere Diboa
- Tatiana Capote as Flavia Istúriz de Malavé
- Raul Amundaray as Félix Manuel Escobar
- Miriam Ochoa as Bertha Betancourt
- Julio Pereira as Robert Armando Malavé
- Gabriel Fernandez as Padre Darío Ignacio
- Niurka Acevedo as Daniela Malavé Betancourt
- Julio Alcazar as Armando Malavé

=== Supporting cast ===
- Eva Blanco as Assunta
- Isabel Moreno as Emperatriz Malave
- Cristina Obin as Chepina
- Marisela Buitriago as Solbela
- Judith Vasquez as Sonia
- Adelaida Mora as Martica
- Carmen Francia as Brigida
- Virginia Garcia as Diana Mendoza
- Jose Vieira as Aldo
- Mario Brito as Campusano
- Mauricio Renteria as Walter Bracamont
- Alexis Escamez as Asdrubal
- Lisbeth Manrique as Doris Yepez
- Deyalit Lopez as Carolina
- Jeanette Flores as Yelitza Josefina Urbina
- Jeinar Moreno as Gabriela Nuñez Anzola
- Kassandra Tepper as Victoria Nuñez Anzola
- Asdrubal Blanco as Jean Paul Nuñez Anzola
- Wilmer Machado as Jose Isabel - Cheyito
- Victor Hernandez as Alfredo Jose Hernandez
- Patricia Noguera
- Anabell Rivero as Michelle Adriana Malave Betancourt
- Roberto Messutti as Juan Carlos
- Carmen Dominguez as Xiva
- Ivette Dominguez as Peggy
- Sofia Diaz as Jennifer Nuñez Anzola
- Jefferson Quiñones as Arturo
- Ana Zambrano as Fefa
- Roxana Diaz as Betania Malave
- Sonia Villamizar as Patricia Miraval
- Jose Torres as Braulio Parades
- Pedro Lander as Julio Cesar Estrada
- Mirtha Borges as Rosaria Boromeo
- Ana Massimo as Cinthia
