= Morena Clara (TV series) =

- Genre: Telenovela; Romance; Drama
- Created by: Ligia Lezama
- Written by: Maria Antonieta Gomez; Juan Clemente Sanchez; Maria Gutierrez; Ruben Geller
- Directed by: Jose Antonio Ferrara
- Creative director: Arquímedes Rivero
- Starring: Astrid Carolina Herrera; Luis José Santander; Alejandro Martínez; Carolina Cristancho; Gabriela Spanic
- Theme music composer: Frank Aguilar
- Opening theme: Como Olvidar by Karina
- Country of origin: Venezuela
- Original language: Spanish
- No. of episodes: 137

Production
- Executive producer: Aimara Escobar
- Producer: Silvia Carnero
- Editor: Carlos Garcia
- Running time: 41-44 minutes
- Production company: Venevisión

Original release
- Network: Venevisión
- Release: 17 January – 2 August 1994

Related
- Peligrosa

Morena Clara is a Venezuelan telenovela created by Ligia Lezama and produced by Venevisión in 1993. The series was distributed internationally by Venevisión International.

Astrid Carolina Herrera and Luis José Santander starred as the main protagonists with Alejandro Martínez, Gabriela Spanic and Henry Galue as the main antagonists.

== Plot ==
Clara Rosa is the illegitimate daughter of a wealthy landowner in Santa Barbara del Zulia and a peasant named Rosalinda who was presumed dead from drowning in the river. Emiliano her father refused to recognize Clara Rosa as his child, and she grows up into a beautiful woman full of illusions. Her bitter and poor aunt Vincenta raised her up in the slums of Caracas together with her son and daughter. Due to their poor situation, Clara Rosa is forced to earn a living as a street peddler though she dreams of having a better life for herself. Meanwhile, Clara's father has become an important political figure, though his personal life is in shambles after his wife Montserrat leaves him for his political enemy Lisandro. Emiliano and his wife Eugenia have raised up his dead brother's sons as his own: Valentin and Francisco. Valentin meets Linda Prado who tricks him into marriage by getting pregnant. Clara Rosa and Valentin will meet after an uprising occurs in the city.

== Cast ==
- Astrid Carolina Herrera as Clara Rosa Guzman/Clara Rosa Andara
- Luis Jose Santander as Valentin Andara
- Alejandro Martínez as Andino
- Gabriela Spanic as Linda Prado
- Carolina Cristancho as Jennifer Andara
- Julio Alcázar as Emiliano Andara
- Luly Bossa as Magdalena Vallán
- Miguel Alcantara as Dr. Vanoni
- Henry Galué as Lissandro Prado
- Yajaira Orta as Montserrat Prado
- Simón Pestana as Armando
- Yuri Rodriguez as Tomas
- Carolina Lopez as Maria Luisa Vanoni
- Marisela Buitriago as Laura
- José Guerrero
- Isabel Herrera
- Isabel Hungría
