= Chucho Sanoja =

Venezuelan musician

Background information
- Born: Jesús Sanoja; September 23, 1926; Caracas, Venezuela
- Died: December 11, 1998 (aged 72) Caracas, Venezuela
- Genres: Venezuelan popular music, Caribbean music
- Occupations: Musician, pianist, composer, director and arranger
- Instrument: Piano
- Formerly of: Chucho Sanoja and his Orchestra

Jesús "Chucho" Sanoja (September 23, 1926 – December 11, 1998) was a Venezuelan musician, pianist, composer, music director and arranger. His grandson, Jesús Alfonso Sanoja Soulés, is an audiovisual producer.

A memorable performances of the Chucho Sanoja and his orchestra was in 1953 at the inauguration of the Hotel Tamanaco in Caracas and at the 10th Conference of Foreign Ministers, held in the Venezuelan capital itself in 1954 where they shared the stage with the famous Lecuona Cuban Boys.

In 1958, Sanoja and his orchestra released the album, Lamento Náufrago (Shipwreck's Complain) on the record label Discomoda.

== See also ==
- Venezuelan music
