= Leonela =

- Genre: Telenovela
- Created by: Delia Fiallo
- Directed by: César Henriquez
- Starring: Mayra Alejandra; Carlos Olivier
- Opening theme: Ladrón de tu amor by Gualberto Ibarreto
- Country of origin: Venezuela
- Original language: Spanish
- No. of episodes: 133 of 45' ( 66 1' part + 67 2' part)

Production
- Producer: Alberto Giarroco
- Editor: Freddy Trujillo
- Production company: RCTV

Original release
- Network: RCTV
- Release: March 19 – June 2, 1983

Related
- Leonela, muriendo de amor (1997)

Leonela is a Venezuelan telenovela written by Delia Fiallo and produced by Radio Caracas Televisión in 1983. The telenovela was divided into two parts: the first part Leonela had 66 episodes and the second part titled Miedo al amor had 67 episodes was produced in 1984. It was distributed internationally by Coral International.

During its airing, the telenovela was surrounded by controversy because of its theme of rape and love. A remake, titled Leonela, muriendo de amor, was made in Peru in 1997.

Mayra Alejandra and Carlos Olivier starred as the protagonists.

== Synopsis ==
Leonela Ferrari Mirabal is a young and beautiful woman who has finished her law career abroad and returns to Venezuela to marry her boyfriend Otto Mendoza. On the day of their engagement, Otto who is an arrogant and egotistical man, humiliates and beats Pedro Luis Guerra, a poor and hardworking man who gets drunk and vows to get revenge on Otto. That night when Leonela goes out for a walk on the beach, she meets Pedro Luis who then decides to get his revenge on Otto by raping Leonela.

Due to the rape, Otto dumps Leonela, her friends abandon her, and she is shunned by high society, but her misfortunes do not end there, as she finds herself pregnant as a result of the rape. Leonela's uncle, Joaquin Machado sends thugs to beat up Pedro Luis, but one of them is killed during the fight, and Pedro Luis is sentenced to jail for 12 years. Leonela despises her son from the moment she learns of her pregnancy, and she decides to give him up for adoption. Although Pedro Luis begs her to give the child to his family, Leonela nevertheless leaves the baby at an orphanage. However, he secretly sends his sister-in-law Nieves María to secretly begin the process of adopting him.

Years later, Pedro Luis, who has studied Law while in prison, gets a sentence reduction on good behavior. Leonela who has since regretted giving her son up for adoption and begins searching for him without knowing that Pedro Luis had him adopted. Leonela comes across Pedro Luis in the courts, and little by little they begin to fall in love. Some time later, Pedro Luis reveals he had his sister-in-law adopt their child who is now named Pedrito. At first, Pedrito is hostile to Leonela since he thinks she will take his father away. But a determined Leonela wins his affection. Leonela and Pedro Luis get married despite everyone's protests.

== Cast ==
- Mayra Alejandra as Leonela Ferrari Mirabal
- Carlos Olivier as Pedro Luis Guerra
- Flavio Caballero as Manaure Guerra
- Hilda Abrahamz as Maribella " Bella"
- Carlos Marquez as Zio Joaquin Machado
- Loly Sanchez as Nieves Maria Bermúdez de Guerra # 1
- Chony Fuentes as Nieves Maria Bermúdez de Guerra # 2
- Carlos Camara Jr. as Otto Mendoza
- Gladys Caceres as Estela Mirabal de Ferrari
- Carlos Mata as Willy González Díaz "Papuchi"
- Jeannette Rodríguez as Patricia :Patty" Machado
- Javier Vidal as Rafael Guerra
- Nancy González as Claudia Montaño
- Carlos Villamizar as Ramon Guerra
- Eric Noriega as Trino
