= Guerreras y Centauros =

- Genre: Telenovela; Romance; Historical Drama
- Created by: Henry Galué
- Written by: Carmelo Castro; Abigail Truchsess
- Starring: Ana Karina Casanova; Jesús Cervó; Damián Genovese; Laura de Sousa; Víctor Cámara
- Country of origin: Venezuela
- Original language: Spanish
- No. of episodes: 105

Production
- Executive producer: Henry Galué
- Production location: Aragua

Original release
- Release: February 23 – August 12, 2015

Guerreras y Centauros is a historical Venezuelan telenovela produced by Quimeravision.

Ana Karina Casanova and Damián Genovese will star as the main protagonists, accompanied by Víctor Cámara. The telenovela will be set in the 19th century against the background of the Battle of Carabobo.

The telenovela was filmed in the Venezuelan state of Aragua.

The filming started in 2013. Broadcast on February 23, 2015 at 9:00 pm.

== Plot ==
Guerreras y Centauros is the story of love in the midst of the dangers of impending war. Love will develop in two large haciendas La Concepción and La Guerrereña. Remedios, owner of La Concepción, falls in love with Aenaus, a simple worker, as a result their relationship will be challenged by the social norms of society

The story unfolds through the interaction between fictional characters and real historical figures.

== Cast ==
- Ana Karina Casanova as María Marta Guerrero
- Jesús Cervó as Jacinto Farfán
- Laura de Sousa as Remedios Dominguez
- Damián Genovese as Eneas
- Víctor Cámara as General José Antonio Páez
- Rosalinda Serfaty as Doña Pura de Exclusa
- Félix Loreto as Remigio Exclusa
- Sebastian Falco as General Narciso
- Simón Pestana - Pietro Lebrino
- Adolfo Cubas - Canelón Bocanegras "Abracadabra"
- Henry Soto as Reinaldo Dominguez
- Carolina Muizzi - Aspacia
- Ricardo Bianchi as Drago de la Peña
- Asdrúbal Blanco - Ataulfo Rivero Vélez
- Aisha Stambouli as Barbarita
- Marisela Buitrago as Muñeca
- Yajaira Orta as Lady Margareth
- Alejandro Corona as Sargento Raulitro
- Janeth Flores as Soledad
- Antonio Cuevas
- Marvin Huise as Jácome
