= List of Venezuelan singers =

This is a list of notable Venezuelan singers that have entered the industry, currently working or have left the industry.

== A ==
- Arca
- Ricardo Aguirre
- Fedora Alemán
- Andreína Álvarez
- Aneeka
- Elizabeth Ayoub

== B ==
- Edgar Bastidas
- Carlos Baute
- Emilio Biggi
- Linda Briceño

== C ==
- Daniella Cabello
- Diosa Canales

== D ==
- Marielena Davila
- María Gabriela de Faría
- Marjorie de Sousa
- La Divaza
- Djane Nany

== E ==
- María Luisa Escobar

== F ==
- Rafael de la Fuente

== G ==
- Paola Galue
- Bárbara Garofalo
- Rafael Rincón González

== H ==
- Reynaldo Hahn

== J ==
- Joaquina

== K ==
- Karina
- Kiara
- Hana Kobayashi

== L ==
- La Chica

== M ==
- Karen Martello
- Mayré Martínez
- Trina Medina
- Alexandra Mey
- Evaluna Montaner
- Jonathan Montenegro
- Lilibeth Morillo
- Morella Muñoz

== N ==
- Nacho
- Graciela Naranjo
- Aida Navarro
- Aérea Negrot

== O ==
- Danny Ocean
- Fernando Osorio

== R ==
- María Rivas
- José Luis Rodríguez
- Liliana Rodríguez
- Nella Rojas
- Sheryl Rubio
- Omar Rudberg

== S ==
- Magdalena Sánchez
- Marger Sealey
- Corina Smith
- Gabriela Spanic
- Vanessa Suárez

== T ==
- Ender Thomas
- Cecilia Todd

== V ==
- Mariana Vega
- Lilia Vera
- Susej Vera
- Anaís Vivas
- Roque Valero

== Y ==
- Yordano

== Z ==
- Reinaldo Zavarce
