= Somos tú y yo (soundtrack) =

2007 soundtrack album by various artists

It's You and Me

Soundtrack album by Various artists
- Released: June 27, 2007
- Recorded: 2007
- Genre: Pop rock, dance-rock, soundtrack
- Length: 36:58
- Label: Universal Music
- Producer: Vladimir Perez

Various artists chronology
It's You and Me (2007)	It's You and Me: A New Day (2009)

Singles from Somos tú y yo
- 1. "Somos tú y yo" Released: June 27, 2007; 2. "Si tu no estás" Released: September 6, 2007; 3. "Sin ti" Released: December 15, 2007; 4. "Asi somos" Released: January 1, 2008; 5. "Y si fuera" Released: January 1, 2008

It's You and Me is the soundtrack album to the eponymous series. The soundtrack was released on June 27, 2007 by the record company Universal Music.

== Background ==
=== Production ===
The album was interpreted by Sheryl Rubio, the protagonist of the series, together with the cast of the series. Also played by Victor Drija, Rosmeri Marval, Aran de las Casas and Gabriel Coronel. The album received mixed reviews from print media. The album was recorded during the filming of the first season of the television series. The lead single was "Somos tú y yo" released on June 27, 2007 with their official video, and subsequently published other singles from the album.

=== Released ===
The album was released on June 27, 2007 by the record company Universal Music. The first single from the soundtrack was the song of the thematic series that names the same album, played by Sheryl Rubio and Victor Drija, but with the international launch of the series have been other versions like the Visayan version, with video, entitled "Ikaw ug Ako" (released on November 18, 2013), which is used as the opening theme in the Philippines and Indonesia, while in Italy the official theme of the opening credits is the original singing by Sheryl Rubio and Victor Drija.

The album is composed of 12 songs plus 3 additional versions performed by Sheryl Rubio and Víctor Drija, the lyrics of the songs on the album were written by Vladimir Perez, screenwriter Somos tú y yo. The album is available in record stores throughout Latin America and through iTunes and Spotify in Mexico and Argentina.

== Track listing ==
=== Latin American edition ===
The Latin American edition contains 12 songs.
No.	Title	Writer(s)	Length
1.	"Somos tú y yo (It's you and me)" (Sheryl Rubio & Víctor Drija)	Daniel Espinoza, María Beatriz Padrón & Vladimir Perez	3:45
2.	"Sí tú no estás (If you are not here)" (Sheryl Rubio & Víctor Drija)	Daniel Espinoza, María Beatriz Padrón & Vladimir Perez	4:49
3.	"Sin ti (Without you)" (Sheryl Rubio & Víctor Drija)	Daniel Espinoza, Vladimir Perez	4:01
4.	"Se que Cambié (I know it changes)" (Claudia Morales)	Vladimir Perez	3:13
5.	"La Fiesta va a Empezar (The party is going to start)" (Víctor Drija & Somos tú yo cast)	Daniel Espinoza, Vladimir Perez	3:02
6.	"Así somos (So we are)" (Víctor Drija)	Daniel Espinoza, Vladimir Perez	3:44
7.	"Y si fuera (And if it were you)" (Sheryl Rubio & Víctor Drija)	Daniel Espinoza, Vladimir Perez	4:18
8.	"El celular (The cell phone)" (Sheryl Rubio & Somos tú y yo cast)	Daniel Espinoza, Vladimir Perez	2:59
9.	"Hello Amiguis (Hello friends)" (Sheryl Rubio & Rosmeri Marval)	Daniel Espinoza, Vladimir Perez	3:38
10.	"Tu Príncipe Soy Yo (Your prince is me)" (Gabriel Coronel)	Daniel Espinoza, Vladimir Perez	2:42
11.	"¿Qué Pasó? (What happened?)" (Sheryl Rubio & Somos tú y yo cast)	Daniel Espinoza, Vladimir Perez	2:58
12.	"Estoy aquí (I'm here)" (Sheryl Rubio & Victor Drija)	Daniel Espinoza, Vladimir Perez	2:12
