= Corina Smith =

Venezuelan singer

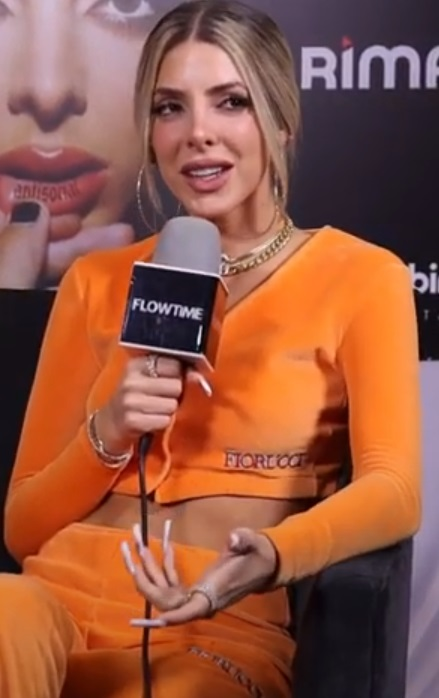
- Smith in 2022

Background information
- Also known as: Corina
- Born: María Corina Smith Pocaterra; 8 September 1991 (age 35); Caracas, Venezuela
- Genres: Ballad; pop; latin pop; dance pop; teen pop
- Occupations: Singer; actress; model
- Instrument: Vocals
- Years active: 2009–present
- Label: Rimas
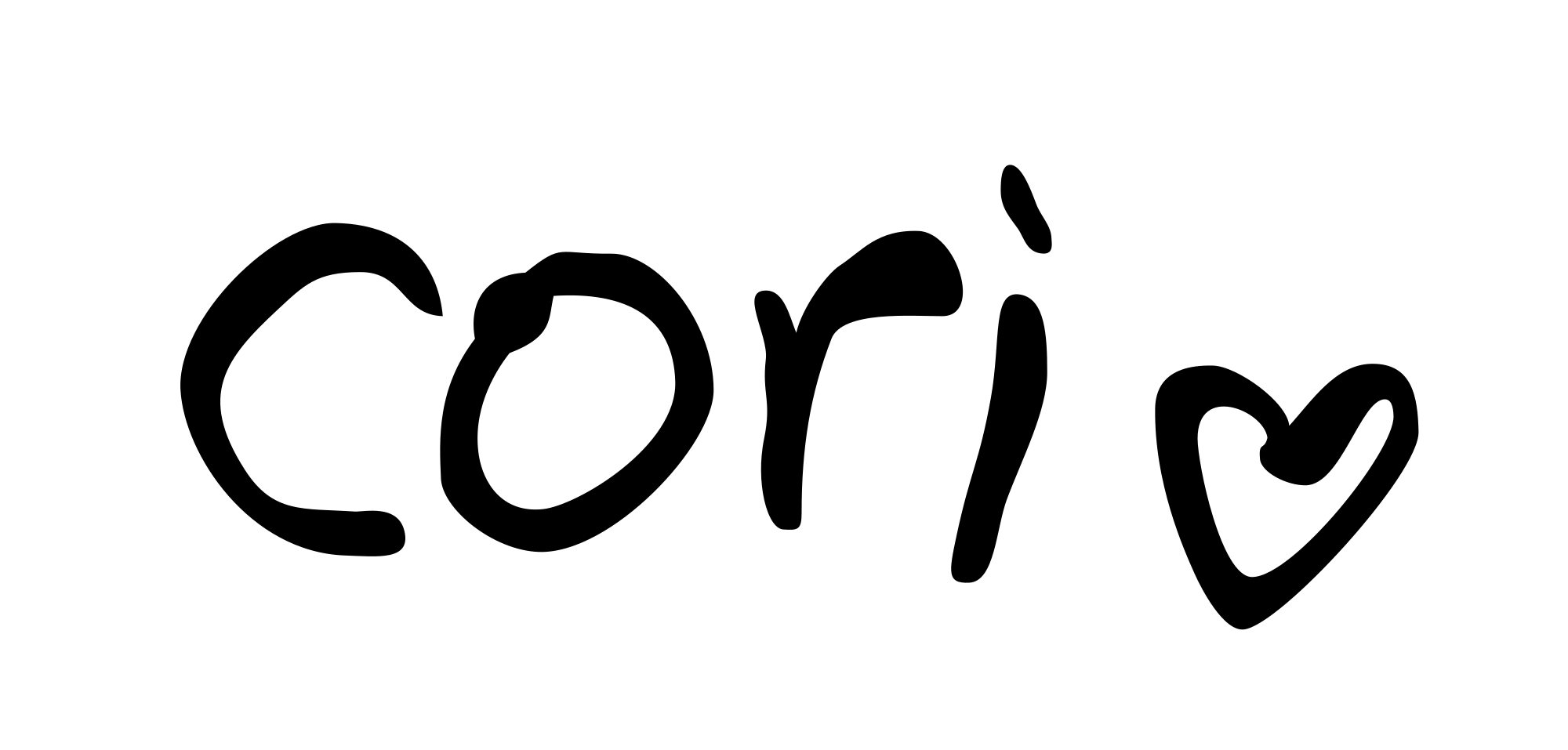
- Signature

María Corina Smith Pocaterra (born 8 September 1991), better known as Corina Smith, is a Venezuelan singer, actress and model.

== Personal life ==
Corina Smith was born in the city of Caracas, Venezuela, on 8 September 1991. She is the daughter of Roberto Smith Perera, the leader of the Venezuelan opposition party], and Marina . Corina Smith studied economics and finance at Bentley University in the United States until 2014 when she returned to Venezuela. Smith has two sisters.

== Career ==
Smith debuted on television in 2009, participating in the television series, Somos tú y yo: Un nuevo día, playing Maria Corina, a cheerleader of the Granadillo Academy. The series is a spin-off of Somos tú y yo. The series was premiered on 17 August 2009 on the Boomerang Latin American channel.

In 2010, Smith joined the main cast of the series, NPS: No puede ser. The series is the second spin-off of Somos tú y yo and marks the closing of the series, the series premiered for the first time 25 July 2010 in Venezuela by Venevisión and on 8 November 2010 by the Boomerang Latin American channel.

=== Career as a singer ===
In 2015, she debuted as a singer with a promotional single, "La Difícil", from which she recorded a video clip in La Guaira, Venezuela, with the participation of Sheryl Rubio, Rosmeri Marval, Rosangelica Piscitelli, Natalia Moretti and Vanessa Suárez.

In May 2016, she released her second single, "Vitamina D", The single is part of the singer's first album. In September 2016, she released her third single "Escape" along with Venezuelan singer Gustavo Elis. The video clip was produced by Nael and Justin, who on other occasions have worked with artists such as Jonathan Moly and Illegales. In December 2016, she released her fourth single "Ahora o Nunca".

In June 2017, she was invited to present a prize in the Heat Latin Music Awards, which is made by the HTV music channel. In August 2017, she traveled to Ecuador as part of the disc promotion and was the opening act of the singer Daddy Yankee in Guayaquil. In September 2017, Corina presented her new single, "Completa". The video was under the production of Nael and Justin. The single quickly managed to position itself at the top of Record Report and as a result of the success obtained, it was the image of important brands in Venezuela.

In February 2018, Smith presents her new single, "Montaña Rusa". The video was under the production of Nael and Justin. In July 2018, she released the single "Más". The video was under the production of Nael and Justin. In September 2018, she released the single "Cantante" with the collaboration of the Venezuelan singers Neutro Shorty and Big Soto. The song was under the production of the music companies Rimas Music and Trap Money. In December 2018, she released the single "Este año". The song was under the production of the musical company DLS Music.

In January 2019, she released the single "Mientras Tanto". The video was directed by Jose Bueno. In February 2019, she released the single "Fondo de Pantalla". The song was under the production of the musical company DLS Music. In April 2019 she released her single "Se te nota".

In 2020 were released a lot of singles and collaborations, some of them are "A Veces", "Dejame Llevarte" with Nibal, "Te Voy a Extrañar" with Lyanno, "Por Fin" and "Un Día Mas".

In 2021 were released the singles "Obviamente" and the others three singles that will be included in her first Debut EP; "A Veces", "GPS" and "Roto".

In March 2022, was released her first EP called Antisocial.

In November 2022, was released her second EP called X Miami.

In 2023, she released her first studio album, Triste Pero Siempre Mami that reached the Venezuelan albums charts and had a good impact in Latin American charts as well.

== Filmography ==
Year	Title	Role	Notes
2009	Somos tú y yo: Un nuevo día	María Corina	Special participation
2010	NPS: No puede ser	Tina Martínez	Co-protagonist

== Discography ==
=== Studio albums ===
List of studio albums, with selected details, chart positions
Title	Album details	Peak chart positions
Title	Album details	VEN
Triste Pero Siempre Mami	Released: May 25, 2023; Label: Rimas Entertainment; Format: Digital download; Track listing: 1. Psicópata; 2. No Me Mientas a la Cara; 3. Triste Pero Siempre Mami; 4. Inestable; 5. Yo Que; 6. Despertar con el Corazón Roto; 7. X100; 8. Xq No Me Dijiste?; 9. La Glock; 10. Hotel San Juan; 11. Como Te Va?; 12. Mi Amor x Ti; 13. Cuídate	1
Menos Triste Más Mami	Released: September 25, 2025; Label: Rimas Entertainment; Format: Digital download; Track listing: 1. Menos triste más mami 2. Cuando me extrañes 3. Aquí seremos 2; 4. Moraleja; 5. X6; 6. Tu ángel tu diabla 7. Lowkey with De La Ghetto; 8. Vuelo a Madrid; 9. Mi ex no quiere a nadie with Lasso; 10. La suite 11. Dealer; 12. Quédate esta noche 13. Estás?; 14. Siempre volvemos 15. No te vi en la disco 16. Apartamento; 17. Me dañaron ya 18. En mi vida nunca más	
"—" denotes releases that did not chart or were not released in that region.

=== Remix albums ===
List of studio albums, with selected details, chart positions
Title	Album details	Peak chart positions
Title	Album details	VEN
Triste Pero Siempre Mami (Acústico)	Released: 15 December 2023; Label: Rimas Entertainment; Format: Digital download; Track listing: 1. Psicópata (Acústico); 2. No Me Mientas a la Cara (Acústico); 3. Triste Pero Siempre Mami (Acústico); 4. Inestable (Acústico); 5. Yo Que (Acústico); 6. Despertar con el Corazón Roto (Acústico); 7. X100 (Acústico); 8. Xq No Me Dijiste? (Acústico); 9. La Glock (Acústico); 10. Hotel San Juan (Acústico); 11. Como Te Va? (Acústico); 12. Mi Amor x Ti (Acústico); 13. Cuídate (Acústico); 14. Escape + X100 (Acústico)	x
"—" denotes releases that did not chart or were not released in that region.

=== Extended plays ===
List of compilation albums, with selected details, chart positions
Title	Extended play details	Peak chart positions
Title	Extended play details	VEN
Antisocial	Released: 11 March 2022; Label: Rimas Entertainment; Format: Digital download; Track listing: 1. Intro; 2. Antisocial; 3. Roto with Eladio Carrión; 4. A Tu Novia with Nesi; 5. Especial; 6. Aquí with Brray; 7. A Veces with Arcángel; 8. GPS with Noriel; 9. Hoy Que Salí	—N/a
X Miami	Released: 11 November 2022; Label: Rimas Entertainment; Format: Digital download; Track listing: 1. Cuandooo; 2. Noche Fría; 3. Punta de un Barco; 4. Sábanas; 5. X Miami; 6. Déjalo Volar; 7. Rápida with Kevvo; 8. Los Tweets; 9. Mami Corina	—N/a
"—" denotes releases that did not chart or were not released in that region.

=== Singles ===
==== As lead artist ====
List of singles as lead artist, showing year released and album name
Title	Year	Álbum
"La Difícil"	2015	Non-album singles
"Vitamina D"	2016	Non-album singles
"Escape" (with Gustavo Elis)	2016	Non-album singles
"Ahora o Nunca"	2016	Non-album singles
"Novios" (with Gustavo Elis)	2017	Non-album singles
"Completa"	2017	Non-album singles
"Montaña Rusa"	2018	Non-album singles
"Más"	2018	Non-album singles
"Soy Para Mi"	2018	Non-album singles
"Cantante" (with Neutro Shorty and Big Soto)	2018	Non-album singles
"Este Año"	2018	Non-album singles
"Mientras Tanto"	2019	Non-album singles
"Fondo de pantalla"	2019	Non-album singles
"Se te nota"	2019	Non-album singles
"Vamos bien" (with Chyno Miranda and EstoeSPosdata featuring Marko, Victor Muñoz, Victor Drija, Jonathan Moly and Lasso)	2019	Non-album singles
"Repetirlo" (with Nael y Justin)	2019	Non-album singles
"Solas" (with Vanessa Suárez)	2020	Non-album singles
"No Somos Nada" (with Kevin Roldán)	2020	Non-album singles
"Pasatiempo" (with Alex Rose)	2020	Non-album singles
"Déjame Llevarte" (with Nibal)	2020	Viaje
"A Veces"	2020	Non-album singles
"Te Voy a Extrañar" (with Lyanno)	2020	Non-album singles
"Aunque Me Lo Niegues" (with Amenazzy)	2020	Non-album singles
"Feeling (Remix)" (with Nelson El Prince)	2020	Non-album singles
"Que Fluya (Remix)" (with Yera and Jerry Di featuring Andy G)	2020	Non-album singles
"Morir Juntos" (with Lenny Tavárez)	2020	Non-album singles
"Suave" (with Matt Hunter)	2020	Non-album singles
"Drama" (with Álvaro Díaz)	2020	Non-album singles
"Por fin "	2020	Non-album singles
"Navisad"	2020	Non-album singles
"Un Día Más" (with Akapellah)	2020	Non-album singles
"Obviamente"	2021	Non-album singles
"GPS" (with Noriel)	2021	Antisocial
"A Veces" (with Arcángel)	2021	Antisocial
"Roto" (with Eladio Carrión)	2022	Antisocial
"Antisocial"	2022	Antisocial
"Los Tweets"	2022	X Miami
"Brutal" (with Sharlene)	2022	Non-album single
"Rápida" (with Kevvo)	2022	X Miami
"Prendía" (with Jotaerre)	2022	Non-album single
"Activa" (with Chesca and Villano Antillano)	2022	Alter Ego
"Mami Corina"	2022	X Miami
"X100"	2023	Triste Pero Siempre Mami
"Como Te Va?"	2023	Triste Pero Siempre Mami
"Carta a una fan"	2024	Non-album singles
"50/50" (with Misael Relative and Gigolo y La Exce)	2024	Non-album singles
"Quitenme el cel"	2024	Non-album singles
"Margarita"	2025	Non-album singles
"Lonely" (with Marconi Impara and Torrres)	2025	Non-album singles
"Ponme en tu boca" (with Jerry Di and Danny Ocean)	2025	Non-album singles
"Mi ex no quiere a nadie" (with Lasso)	2025	Menos triste más mami
"Quédate esta noche"	2025	Menos triste más mami
"Por Una Noche" (with Ingratax)	2025	Non-album single
"Encubiertos" (with Mike Bahía)	2026	TBA

==== As featured artist ====
List of singles as featured artist, showing year released and album name
Title	Year	Album
"V.I.P" (Gaby Noya featuring Corina Smith and Vanessa Suárez)	2017	Non-album singles
"WYA (Remix Blue)" (J Abdiel, iZaak and Hades66 featuring Miky Woodz and Corina Smith)	2024	Non-album singles
"Mental Picture" (Miky Woodz featuring Corina Smith)	2024	Non-album singles
"Con La Mini (Remix)" (Kidd Voodoo, Miky Woodz, Pirlo and Siggy featuring Mattei, Jowell and Corina Smith)	2025	La Selección

=== Promotional singles ===
List of promotional singles, showing year released and originating album
Title	Year	Album
"Aquí" (with Brray)	2022	X Miami
"Especial"	2022	X Miami
"Hotel San Juan"	2023	Triste Pero Siempre Mami
"Psicópata"	2023	Triste Pero Siempre Mami

=== Guest appearances ===
Title	Year	Other artists	Album
"Quiéreme"	2019	Jonathan Moly	13
"Llégate"	2020	Sixto Rein	Conexión
"Todo o Nada"	2021	Eladio Carrión	Monarca
"Protagonistas"	2025	Noreh	Noreh – A film by la vida real
"@Bomba De Humo"	2026	Dome	La Del Arroba
"8 preguntas"	2026	Dani Barranco	Eso no es de Rockstar
