= Somos tú y yo: un nuevo día (soundtrack) =

It's You and Me: A New Day

Soundtrack album by Various artists
- Released: September 2, 2009
- Recorded: 2009
- Genre: Pop rock dance-rock soundtrack
- Length: 18:58
- Label: Universal Music
- Producer: Vladimir Perez

It's You and Me soundtrack chronology
It's You and Me (2007)	It's You and Me: A New Day

It's You and Me: A New Day is the television soundtrack for series three of the children's television show of the same name, based on the 1978 film Grease. It is sung by actress and singer Sheryl Rubio and features six tracks. The album was first released on September 2, 2009 by Universal Music.

== Track listing ==
=== Latin American edition ===
The Latin American edition contains 12 songs.
No.	Title	Writer(s)	Length
1.	"Volver a Empezar (Start over)" (Sheryl Rubio & Víctor Drija)	Daniel Espinoza, María Beatriz Padrón & Vladimir Perez	3:45
2.	"Grovie Grovie (Groovie groovie)" (Sheryl Rubio & Somos tú y yo cast)	Daniel Espinoza, María Beatriz Padrón & Vladimir Perez	4:49
3.	"Ven Niña (Come girl)" (Víctor Drija)	Daniel Espinoza, Vladimir Perez	4:01
4.	"Ser Reina es lo Mejor (Being Queen is the Best)" (Sheryl Rubio)	Vladimir Perez	3:13
5.	"La Fiesta va a Empezar (The party is going to start)" (Víctor Drija & Somos tú yo cast)	Daniel Espinoza, Vladimir Perez	3:02
6.	"El Rock N' Roll (Rock N 'Roll)" (Aran de las Casas)	Daniel Espinoza, Vladimir Perez	3:27
7.	"Hoy pienso en ti (Today I think of you)" (Sheryl Rubio)	Daniel Espinoza, Vladimir Perez	4:10
