= Micro TDH =

Venezuelan singer songwriter (born 1999)

- Also known as: Micro TDH; MC Microbio; MC Micro
- Born: Fernando Daniel Morillo Rivas; 14 April 1999 (age 26); Mérida, Venezuela
- Origin: Venezuela
- Genres: Latin R&B; Latin hip hop; dancehall; Latin reggae; urban pop; reggaeton
- Occupations: Singer; rapper; songwriter; record producer
- Instruments: Vocals; piano; guitar
- Years active: 2015-present
- Labels: The Dog House; Big Ligas; Warner Latina

Fernando Daniel Morillo Rivas (born April 14, 1999), known professionally as Micro TDH, is a Venezuelan singer, rapper and songwriter. He was awarded at the Union Rock Show Awards as "Mejor artista revelación" in 2016.

Known for singles like "Cafuné", "Bésame sin sentir", "Aquí Estoy", among others. He gained greater popularity internationally thanks to his collaboration on the song "Te vi" with the Colombian group Piso 21, "Demasiado Tarde" as a duet with Lenny Tavárez, "Dime Cuantas Veces Remix" with Rels B, Lenny Tavárez & Justin Quiles, and his single with Myke Towers, "El Tren".

== Early life ==
Fernando was born on April 14, 1999, in the city of Mérida, Mérida State, Venezuela. At the age of 4, he became interested in music, participating in Christmas spots and regional radio programs. At the age of 12, he decided to venture into rap music, debuting as a freestyler in the streets of Mérida, where he became known as MC microbio. Later, "MC Micro" was born. His history in the music industry began with the record company The Dog House, from where he formed his name as Micro TDH.

== Career ==
His first production was with the group The Dog House (TDH), with whom he made a mixtape called The Dog House Mixtape Vol. 1", made up of a total of eight songs, in which he also shared lyrics with Misterio MC, Kaba, J-Force, among others.

Later in 2016 he signed a contract with the company Los Vatos Inc, which was directed by the ragpicker Neutro Shorty, with which he was until the end of 2018.

He won two awards at the sixth edition of the Pepsi Music Awards Venezuela in the category "Mejor tema Hip Hop" with the theme of Cafuné and "Artista refrescante".

He has collaborated with several international artists such as Big Soto, Akapellah, Rels b, Piso 21, Khan, Gera MX, Justin Quiles, Myke Towers and Lenny Tavarez. In collaboration with the latter, he has released the single "Demasiado Tarde" which has more than 160 million views on YouTube and is part of the artist's first compositions in the recording studio in the city of Medellin, Colombia after being signed by the musical production company Big Ligas.

In 2020, he released the video clip for the song "Ámate".

On June 28, 2021, Micro TDH has signed an exclusive record deal with Warner Music Latina.

== Discography ==
=== Studio albums ===
Year	Title
2016	18-04
2017	Inefable
2021	Nueve
2022	The Classics, vol. 1
2024	The Classics, vol. 2
2025	Segundo Acto

=== Singles ===
Year	Title
2016	"Contactos"
2017	"Cafuné"
2017	"No Te Merezco"
2017	"Entra"(with Neutro Shorty)
2017	"Don't Get Out"
2017	"Ponte" (with Big Soto)
2017	"No Creo En Mujeres"
2017	""Your Lover"
2017	"Solo"
2017	"El Vuelo"
2017	"Nada Más"
2017	"Me Conozco"
2018	"Honey (Spanish Version)"
2018	"Querer volar"
2018	"Tu Turno" (with Neutro Shorty y Big Soto)
2018	"Cómo No"
2018	"Vuelve A Mí"
2018	"Baila Con Poder" (with Kat Kandy)
2018	"No Te Dejé Sola"
2018	"Aquí Estoy"
2018	"Confianza"
2018	"Bésame Sin Sentir"
2018	"Te Vi" (by Piso 21)
2019	"Dime Cuantas Veces" (with Rels B)
2019	"En El Hood"
2019	"Cumpliendo El Objetivo"
2019	"Demasiado Tarde" (con Lenny Tavárez)
2020	"Amor De Red Social"
2020	"Desamor"
2020	"Dime Cuantas Veces REMIX" (with Rels B, Lenny Tavárez y J Quiles)
2020	"Ámate"
2020	"Volver"
2021	"Ni Vivo Ni Muerto" (with Lasso)
2021	"El Tren" (with Myke Towers)
2021	"Las Olas" (with Yandel)
2021	"EL INCA"
2021	"EL LOBBY" (with Pablo Alborán)
2021	"NUEVE (Intro)"
2022	"La Original" (with Fuego)
2022	"Toxic" (with Brito Dios)
2022	"EN SOLEDAD" (with ADSO)
2022	"Prendía" (with Big Soto)
2022	"Peligrosa"
2022	"12x3 Remix" (with DEKKO)
2022	"La Chama" (with Mau y Ricky)
