= NPS: No puede ser =

Venezuelan teen sitcom

- Also known as: It Can't Be!
- Genre: Comedy
- Created by: Vladimir Pérez; Olivier Lelardoux; Elizabeth Carmona
- Written by: Vladimir Pérez; Olivier Lelardoux; Elizabeth Carmona
- Directed by: Various
- Creative director: Olivier Lelardoux
- Starring: Sheryl Rubio; Hendrick Bages; Rosmeri Marval; Corina Smith; Rosangelica Piscitelli; Samantha Méndez
- Theme music composer: Vladimir Perez
- Opening theme: No puede ser performed by Sheryl Rubio
- Composers: Vladimir Pérez; Isaac Gonzales; Ludovic Loy; Elizabeth Carmona
- Country of origin: Venezuela
- Original language: Spanish
- No. of seasons: 1
- No. of episodes: 50

Production
- Executive producer: Rock Diaz
- Production locations: Caracas, Venezuela
- Running time: 45 minutes
- Production company: Tigritos Media Productions

Original release
- Network: Venevisión; Boomerang
- Release: 22 July – 30 August 2011

It Can't Be! (Spanish: No puede ser; stylized as NPS: ¡No puede ser!) is a Venezuelan teen comedy television series produced by Boomerang Latin America and Venevisión. It is a spin-off of Somos tú y yo. It is aimed at teen and youth audiences. It premiered on July 22, 2011.

Sheryl Rubio, Hendrick Bages, Natalia Moretti, Corina Smith and Samantha Méndez are the leads. Rosangélica Piscitelli and Rosmeri Marval are the antagonists.

== Synopsis ==
No puede ser takes place a year and a half after Somos tú y yo. Sheryl Sanchez and Rosmery Rivas, rivals from the previous series, are thrown back together after signing up to win a recording contract on a televised reality show. The pair also fight to win the attention of Hendrick, an old schoolmate who is now a counselor at the summer camp where all contestants must live together during the competition.

== Production ==
=== Pre-production and background ===
In August 2009, Boomerang announced that Vladimir Perez, Elizabeth Carmona, Patricio Gamonal and Olivier Lelardoux, the creators of Somos tú y yo and La Tortuga Taruga from Atiempo in Chile, would be making a spin-off of Somos tu y yo an unprecedented worldwide success have now crossed over into a different genre, the sitcom, to bring their fans fresh adventures full of comedy and music called NPS: No puede ser, and ordered the pilot episode. The series was broadcast for the first time in Venezuela on July 25, 2011 by Venevisión, with an audience of 4.3 million viewers. In Latin America the series premiered on November 8, 2010, while its premiere in Italy and Spain was the September 26, 2011 by Frisbee.

== Cast ==
- Sheryl Rubio as Sheryl Sánchez
- Hendrick Bages as Hendrick Welles
- Rosmeri Marval as Rosmery Rivas
- Samantha Méndez as Laura McDonovan
- Rosangélica Piscitelli as Rosangela Rojas
- Natalia Moretti as Abril Pérez
- Corina Smith as Tina Martínez
- Joshua García as Joshua Welles
- Alejandro Soteldo as Enrique Hitchcock
- Alfredo Lovera as Carmelo Guzmán
- Francisco Ruíz as Óscar
- Omar Sabino as Nelson
- Diego Salazar as Marcos Guzmán
- Aileen Celeste as Tatiana Jiurcovich
- Catherina Cardozo as Beatríz Rocas

=== Guest stars ===
- Myriam Abreu
- Victor Drija
- Gustavo Elis
- Sixto Rein

== Episodes ==
Season	Episodes	Originally aired	
Season	Episodes	Season premiere	Season finale
1	50	July 22, 2011	August 28, 2011

== Music ==
The first soundtrack of the series, titled No puede ser, was released on July 22, 2011.

=== Track listing ===
No.	Title	Writer(s)	Length
1.	"No puede ser" (Sheryl Rubio)	María Beatriz Padrón, Vladimir Pérez, Daniel Espinoza, Olivier Lelardoux	1:50
2.	"Te olvidaste de mi" (Sheryl Rubio y Hendrick Bages)	Sheryl Rubio, Vladimir Pérez, Daniel Espinoza, Elizabeth Carmona	4:12
3.	"Bello como un ángel" (Sheryl Rubio, Rosmeri Marval, Rosangélica Piscitelli, María Corina Smith, Samantha Méndez y Natalia Moretti)	Vladimir Perez, Daniel Espinoza	3:20
4.	"Pequeños Detalles" (Sheryl Rubio)	María Beatriz Padrón, Vladimir Perez, Daniel Espinoza	1:40
5.	"Quizás" (Sheryl Rubio)	María Beatriz Padrón, Vladimir Perez, Daniel Espinoza	1:41
6.	"El Centro Comercial" (Rosmeri Marval)	Vladimir Perez, Daniel Espinoza, Elizabeth Carmona, Olivier Lelardoux	1:38
Total length:			38:46
