= Atómico =

- Directed by: Vladimir Pérez
- Presented by: Alfredo Lovera; Mariana Álvarez; Joshua García; Natalia Moretti; Antonella Baricelli (2005-2006; Alex Goncalves (2005-2006); Sheryl Rubio (2005-2006)
- Opening theme: "Atómico se mueve por ti"
- Country of origin: Venezuela
- Original language: Spanish
- No. of seasons: 3

Production
- Executive producer: Maraba Productions

Original release
- Network: Venevisión
- Release: March 3, 2014 – 2023

Related
- El Club de Los Tigritos; Rugemania

Atómico, is a television show produced by Maraba Productions for Venevisión. Hosted by Alfredo Lovera as Himself, Mariana Álvarez as Herself, Joshua García as Himself and Natalia Moretti Herself.

== History ==
Atómico it began airing as a similar program to El Club de Los Tigritos and Rugemania with Interactive Games, Music, cartoons, Series. in 2006, the program ended to begin issuing Venevisión telenovelas. As of March 3, 2014, as established by the "La ley de resorte de Venezuela", Venevisión telenovela removed 3 hours to transmit Atómico.

== Presenters ==
- Alfredo Lovera as Himself
- Mariana Álvarez as Herself
- Joshua García as Himself
- Natalia Moretti as Herself
- Antonella Baricelli as Herself (2005-2006)
- Alex Goncalves as Himself (2005-2006)
- Sheryl Rubio as Herself (2005-2006)

== Guests ==
- Víctor Drija
- Los Hermanos Valentinos (Appear during the circus performance)

== Programs broadcast ==
=== Current broadcast ===
- Chica vampiro
- Somos tú y yo
- Sam & Cat
- The Penguins of Madagascar
- SpongeBob SquarePants
- ICarly

=== Programs that are no longer transmitted ===
Some of these series are transmitted on Saturday and Sunday Atómico repetitions. Others are issued occasionally.

- No puede ser
- Bondi Band
- Kung Fu Panda: Legends of Awesomeness
- Power Rangers Jungle Fury
- The Fairly OddParents
- Victorious
- Marvin Marvin
- Big Time Rush
- Planet Sheen
- El Club de Los Tigritos
- Fanboy & Chum Chum

== Programming 2001-2004 ==
- Animaniacs
- Digimon: Digital Monsters
- Fantastic Four
- The Flintstones
- The Huckleberry Hound Show
- Jabberjaw
- Victor Hugo
- Maylin
- Power Rangers
- The Quick Draw McGraw Show
- Sabrina: The Animated Series
- Scooby-Doo, Where Are You!
- Tiny Toon Adventures
- Top Cat
- Woody Woodpecker
- X-Men

== Programming 2005-2008 ==
- The Amanda Show
- Beyblade
- Camp Lazlo
- Danny Phantom
- Drake & Josh
- Foster's Home for Imaginary Friends
- Grossology
- Hannah Montana
- Jackie Chan Adventures
- Kenan & Kel
- Lizzie McGuire
- Misión S.O.S
- My Gym Partner's a Monkey
- Phil of the Future
- Pokémon
- The Powerpuff Girls
- Shaggy & Scooby-Doo Get a Clue!
- SpongeBob SquarePants
- That's So Raven
- The Zeta Project
- Zoboomafoo
- Zoey 101
