= Dramáticas =

- Genre: Drama
- Created by: Daniel Ferrer Cubillán; Daniel Alfonso Rojas
- Written by: Daniel Alfonso Rojas; Indira Páez; Violeta Fonseca; César Sierra; Fernando Martínez
- Directed by: César Manzano
- Starring: Scarlet Ortiz; Luis Gerónimo Abreu; Roxana Díaz
- Country of origin: Venezuela
- Original language: Spanish
- No. of seasons: 1
- No. of episodes: 12

Production
- Executive producers: Daniel Ferrer Cubillán; Manuel Fraiz-Grijalba
- Producers: Lorena Vivas; Marcos Godoy
- Production locations: Caracas, Venezuela; Los Angeles, United States
- Cinematography: Manuel Díaz Casanova
- Camera setup: Multi-camera
- Production companies: Venevisión; HispanoMedio

Original release
- Network: Venevisión
- Release: 16 October – 30 October 2023

Dramáticas is a Venezuelan television series produced by Venevisión in co-production with HispanoMedio. It stars Scarlet Ortiz, Luis Gerónimo Abreu and Roxana Díaz. It premiered on Venevisión on 16 October 2023. The series ended its broadcast on 30 October 2023.

== Cast ==
- Scarlet Ortiz as Marilyn Ortiz
- Luis Gerónimo Abreu as Alonso Abreu
- Roxana Díaz as Sofía Díaz
- Lupita Ferrer as Yolanda Mistral
- Mimí Lazo as Catalina Montenegro
- María Antonieta Duque as Chiquinquirá Mondragón "Chiqui"
- Dora Mazzone as Carlota Mondragón
- Javier Vidal as Ignacio Mondragón
- Carlos Guillermo Haydon as Pedro Pablo Alcantara
- Elba Escobar as Constanza
- Hilda Abrahamz as Ligia Duzmar
- Arnoldo Betancourt as Eliseo Bustamante
- Tania Sarabia as Honoria
- Amanda Gutiérrez as Inés Duarte
- Jorge Palacios as Joaquín Perdomo
- Rosmeri Marval as Abigail Domínguez
- Laura Termini as Lalita Fonseca
- Víctor Drija as Piero Pérez
- Arán de las Casas as Adrián Perdomo
- Fernando Villate
- Isabella Pérez as Carolina Abreu

== Production ==
On 14 April 2023, it was announced that Venevisión had entered into an agreement with HispanoMedio to co-produce a television series, marking the return of the production of fiction and telenovelas in Venezuela. Official filming began on 13 June 2023.
