= Lasso (singer) =

- Born: Andrés Vicente de Jesús Lazo Uslar; 18 February 1988 (age 38); Caracas, Venezuela
- Genre: Pop
- Occupation: Singer-songwriter
- Instruments: Vocals, guitar
- Years active: 2011–present
- Label: Indie
- Partner: Sheryl Rubio (2011-2018)
- Website: www.lassomusica.com

Lasso (born Andrés Vicente de Jesús Lazo Uslar on 18 February 1988), is a Venezuelan singer and composer, and the nephew of actress Mimí Lazo.

== Solo career ==
In 2009, Lasso started working on his first album with Francisco Díaz, producer of Desorden Público, to produce and mix his album. This process started at Sonofolk, a music studio, between October 2009 and June 2010, and came out with twelve songs. Once he finished recording the album, Lasso had the chance to hire Brian Gardner to master and finish the album in Los Angeles. When designing the album's artwork, he decided he would change his name to Lasso to pay homage to a Phoenix song of the same name he really enjoyed.

The music genre of this album is pop rock, but there are also influences of Latin rhythms like reggae and European rhythms like Flamenco.

After many months, Lasso returned to Venezuela with his first single "No Pares de Bailar", from his album Sin Otro Sentido. This album was launched in March 2011 and Recordland in charge of the national distribution. His single "Te Veo", became a number one hit in Venezuela, South America.

In 2015 he moved to Mexico City to continue expanding his audience and musical career. There he launched his album "El Exilio Voluntario de una Mente Saturada" and his two recent singles "Un Millon Como Tu", in collaboration with Chilean-born Camila Gallardo, and "Souvenir" and the new song “Subtítulos” with Danna Paola released on 27 September 2019.

== First single ==
The launch of his first single, "No Pares de Bailar", came with a music video filmed in November 2010. The producer was Paolo Merlini, Carolina Uslar as art director, and Rodolfo Bear as a photographer.

"No Pares de Bailar" was a Top #1 in HTV and his album Sin otro sentido became a top seller at the popular Venezuelan music stores Recordland for many weeks.

== Awards ==
Lasso was named Debut Artist of the Year at the 2012 Pepsi Venezuela Music Awards, and Pop Artist of the Year in 2013. In 2023 Lasso and fellow Venezuelan group LAGOS were awarded best Pop/Rock Song on the 23rd Latin Grammys.

== Discography ==
=== Studio albums ===
- Sin Otro Sentido (2011)
- El Exilio Voluntario de una Mente Saturada (2017)
- Cuatro Estaciones (2021)
- Eva (2023)
- Malcriado (2025)
- Objetos frágiles en ambientes hostiles (2026)

=== Extended plays ===
- Cuatro Estaciones: Primavera (2020)
- Cuatro Estaciones: Verano (2020)
- Cuatro Estaciones: Otoño (2021)
- Cuatro Estaciones: Invierno (2021)

=== Live albums ===
- En Vivo Desde El Teatro Caupolicán, Santiago de Chile (2023)

=== Singles ===
List of singles as lead artist, with selected chart positions, showing year released and album name
Title	Year	Peak chart positions							Certifications	Album
Title	Year	VEN	ARG	BOL	ECU	MEX	PER	WW	Certifications	Album
"No Pares de Bailar"	2011	—	—	—	—	—	—	—		Sin Otro Sentido
"Sin Otro Sentido"	2011	—	—	—	—	—	—	—		Sin Otro Sentido
"Te Veo"	2012	—	—	—	—	—	—	—		Sin Otro Sentido
"Quiero Que Vuelvas" (with Sheryl Rubio)	2012	—	—	—	—	—	—	—		Sin Otro Sentido
"Como Te Odio"	2013	—	—	—	—	—	—	—		El Exilio Voluntario de una Mente Saturada
"De Tú a Tú"	2014	13	—	—	—	—	—	—		El Exilio Voluntario de una Mente Saturada
"Hoy Te Dejo de Amar"	2015	16	—	—	—	—	—	—		El Exilio Voluntario de una Mente Saturada
"Diferente"	2016	1	—	—	—	—	—	—		El Exilio Voluntario de una Mente Saturada
"No Me Trates de Olvidar"	2017	1	—	—	—	—	—	—		El Exilio Voluntario de una Mente Saturada
"Cambio de Luces" (with SAAK)	2018	—	—	—	—	—	—	—		Non-album singles
"Un Millón Como Tú" (with Cami)	2019	2	—	—	—	—	—	—	AMPROFON: Platinum+Gold	Non-album singles
"Souvenir"	2019	4	—	—	—	—	—	—		Non-album singles
"Subtítulos" (with Danna Paola)	2019	4	—	—	—	—	—	—	AMPROFON: Platinum+Gold	Cuatro estaciones
"Odio Que No Te Odio" (with Cami)	2020	—	—	—	—	—	—	—	AMPROFON: Platinum	Non-album single
"Kamikaze"	2020	—	—	—	—	—	—	—		Cuatro estaciones
"Vamos a mi Ritmo" (with Isabela Souza)	2020	—	—	—	—	—	—	—		Cuatro estaciones
"Ibuprofeno"	2020									Cuatro estaciones
"Mmm"	2020	—	—	—	—	—	—	—		Cuatro estaciones
"Hasta Ese Día"	2020	—	—	—	—	—	—	—		Cuatro estaciones
"Quiero que me quieras"	2020									Cuatro estaciones
"Los Amigos No Se Besan en la Boca" (with Ana Guerra)	2020	—	—	—	—	—	—	—		Cuatro estaciones
"Llamarte (Otra Vez)" (with Inti y Vicente)	2020									Non-album single
"La Lotería"	2020	—	—	—	—	—	—	—		Cuatro estaciones
"Odiarte" (with Paty Cantú)	2021									La Mexicana
"Traductor" (with Big Soto)	2021									Non-album single
"Ni vivo ni muerto" (with Micro TDH)	2021									Nueve
"Tenemos Que Hablar"	2021	—	—	—	—	—	—	—		Cuatro estaciones
"Me Arruinaste Netflix" (with Micro TDH)	2021	—	—	—	—	—	—	—		Cuatro estaciones
"Ladrones" (with Danna Paola)	2021	—	—	—	—	—	—	—		Cuatro estaciones
"Julia" (with Lagos)	2021									Clásicos
"Mi imaginación"	2021									Cuatro estaciones
"De Mí, De Mí, De Mí" (with José Madero)	2021	—	—	—	—	—	—	—		Cuatro estaciones
"Mi canción favorita" (with Susana Cala)	2021									Sopa De Letras
"Dios"	2022	17	—	—	—	—	—	—		Eva
"Ojos Marrones" (solo or with Sebastian Yatra)	2022	11	41	7	9	7	5	75	AMPROFON: 2× Platinum+Gold; RIAA: 6× Platinum (Latin)	Eva
"Algodón"	2022	—	—	—	—	—	—	—		Eva
"Yo-yo"	2022	—	—	—	—	—	—	—		Eva
"Corriendo Con Tijeras"	2022	—	—	—	—	—	—	—		Eva
"Yo No Nací Para Amar" (with Juan Gabriel)	2022	—	—	—	—	—	—	—		Los Dúo 3
"Oma"	2022	—	—	—	—	—	—	—		Non-album single
"Plástico"	2023	—	—	—	—	—	—	—		Eva
"Los Hombres Son Todos Iguales"	2023	—	—	—	—	—	—	—		Eva
"No Es Sólo Un Juego (The Official Concacaf Gold Cup 2023™ Theme)" (with Akon and Adriel Favela featuring Chiquis and Oriana)	2023									Non-album single
"Eva"	2023	—	—	—	—	—	—	—		Eva
"El Primero"	2023	—	—	—	—	—	—	—		Non-album singles
"Feliz Por Ti"	2023	—	—	—	—	—	—	—		Non-album singles
"Todo Regresa"	2023	—	—	—	—	—	—	—		Non-album singles
"La Mexicana" (with Ramon Vega)	2024	—	—	—	—	—	—	—		Non-album singles
"Si no fuera por ti" (with Beret)	2024	—	—	—	—	—	—	—		Non-album singles
"Rey ahogado" (with José Madero)	2024									Sarajevo
"Bilingües" (with Mau y Ricky)	2024									Malcriado
"No Escuches Esta Canción" (with Micro TDH)	2024									Malcriado
"Ve y Diles V2 (Remix)" (with Alex Ponce and Sebastián Llosa)	2024									Ruido, El Silencio y Yo
"Siempre Llegas Tarde" (with Sofia Reyes)	2024									Malcriado
"Ese Final Ya Me Lo Sé"	2024									Malcriado
"En Otra Vida" (with Yami Safdie)	2024									Querida Yo
"Quebranto" (with Leo Rizzi)	2024									Pájaro Azul Extended
"Vienes o voy?"	2024									Malcriado
"En Otra Vida" (with Yami Safdie and Carín León)	2025									Non-album single
"Cinco Minutos Más" (with Ha*Ash)	2025									Malcriado
"Cuando Te Dejan De Querer"	2025									Malcriado
"Fetiche" (with Ximena Sariñana)	2025									Malcriado
"Pastillas Pa Dormir" (with Mar Lucas)	2025									Non-album singles
"No lo subas a instagram" (with Mafalda Cardenal)	2025									Non-album singles
"Mi ex no quiere a nadie" (with Corina Smith)	2025	—	—	—	—	—	—	—		Menos Triste Más Mami
"A Tiempo" (with Romoo)	2025	—	—	—	—	—	—	—		A Tiempo
"Nunca Me Lo Esperé" (with Piso 21)	2026									Trescender
"Pornografía"	2026									Non-album single
"Y a ti, Qué tal te va?" (with Kakalo)	2026									De Parte Mía
"Feliz Aniversario"	2026	—	—	—	—	—	—	—		TBA

== Tours ==
- Malcriado World Tour (2025)

Date	City	Country	Venue
August 14	Monterrey	Mexico	Showcenter Complex
August 15	Tulum	Mexico	Explanada Municipal (Aura Music Fest 2025)
August 16	Guadalajara	Mexico	Teatro Diana
August 22	Querétaro	Mexico	
August 23	León	Mexico	
August 27	Mexico City	Mexico	Teatro Metropolitan
August 29	Puebla	Mexico	
October 5	London	England	The Garage
October 7	Berlin	Germany	Columbia Theater
October 9	Valencia	Spain	Sala Moon
October 10	Paris	France	Cabaret Sauvage
October 12	Barcelona	Spain	Sala Razzmatazz
October 13	Madrid	Spain	Warner Music Station Príncipe Pío
October 14	Madrid	Spain	Warner Music Station Príncipe Pío
October 16	Porto	Portugal	Hard Club
October 24	Santo Domingo	Dominican Republic	Auditorio Pabellón de La Fama
October 30	Panama City	Panama	
November 6	Miami	United States	Zey Zey
November 12	Orlando	United States	House of Blues
November 14	Houston	United States	Home Run Dugout
November 15	New York City	United States	Hostos Center
November 19	Toronto	Canada	
November 20	Montreal	Canada	Club Soda
November 23	Vancouver	Canada	Rickshaw Theatre
November 24	Seattle	United States	Neumos
December 4	Guayaquil	Ecuador	
December 5	Cuenca	Ecuador	
December 6	Quito	Ecuador	
December 8	Trujillo	Peru	El Palmar Hacienda y Bar
December 9	Chiclayo	Peru	
December 12	Lima	Peru	Anfiteatro del parque de la exposición
December 13	Arequipa	Peru	Teatro Metropolitano de Bellas Artes
December 19	Buenos Aires	Argentina	Teatro Gran Rex
December 18	Santiago	Chile	Movistar Arena
