= Vanessa Suárez =

Venezuelan actress, singer and model (born 1991)

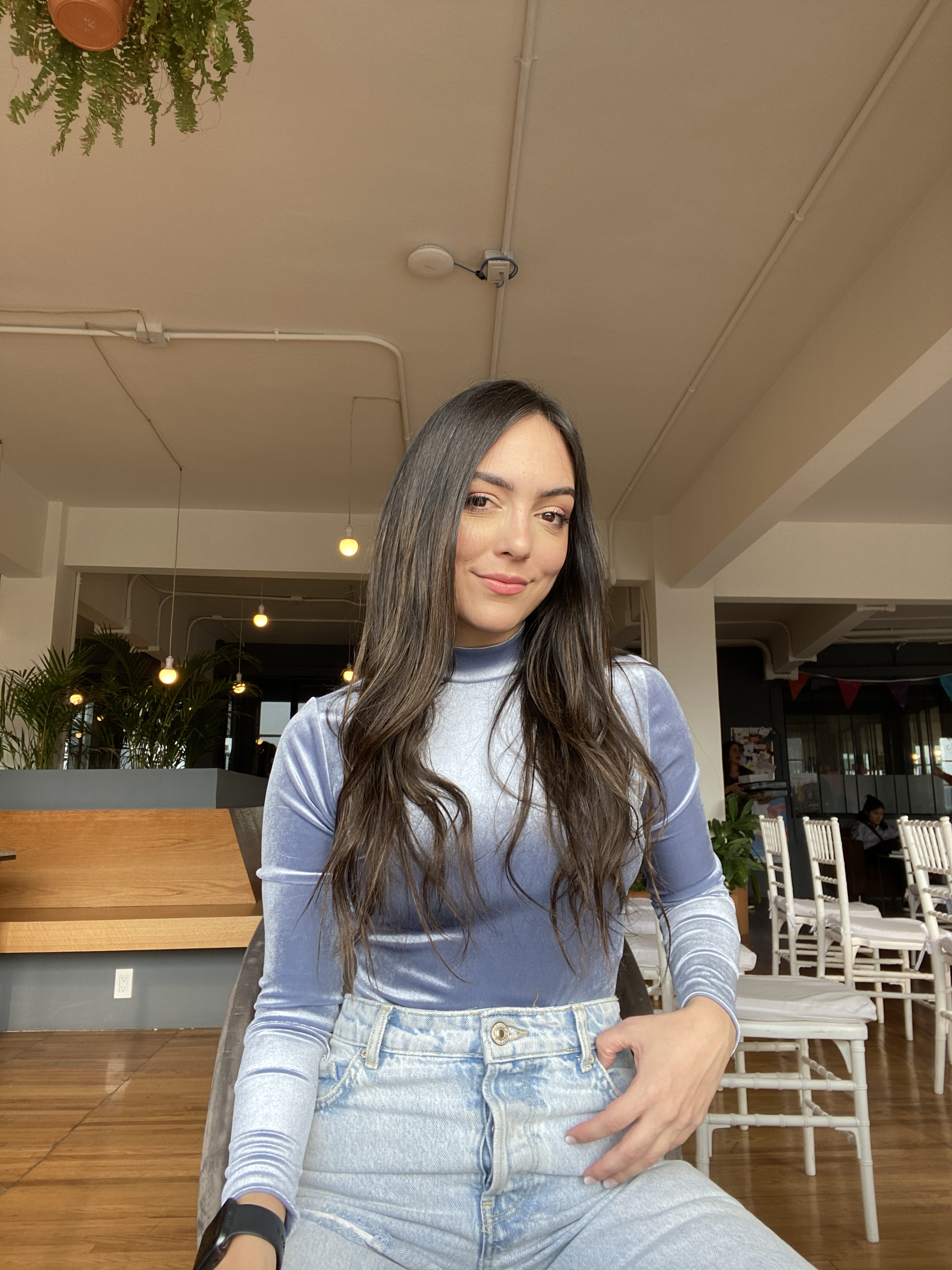
- Vanessa Suárez in 2019
- Born: September 9, 1991 (age 34); Caracas, Venezuela
- Education: Universidad Santa María
- Occupations: Actress, singer, model
- Years active: 2007–present
- Height: 1.62 m (5 ft 4 in)

Vanessa Alexandra Suárez Trivella (born 9 September 1991) is a Venezuelan actress, singer and model, known for her roles as Vanessa in the television series Somos tú y yo and its spinoff series Somos tú y yo, un nuevo día.

== Early life ==
Suárez was born in Caracas, Venezuela. She studied in high school at Colegio El Angel en Caracas. She graduated from Universidad Santa María in 2011.

== Career ==
In 2006, castings began for Somos tú y yo, Suárez decided to participate in the audition of the series and after six months of tests, she managed to get the role of Vanessa, the best friend of the protagonist of the series. The series was a co-production between Boomerang and Venevisión. The series was broadcast in Latin America, Europe, Middle East and Africa. The series premiered on January 15, 2008 by Boomerang in Latin America and Europe. The series ended on December 15, 2008 and its final episode had and audience of approximately 9.8 million. In 2008, the cast toured Venezuela, performing songs from the series, and when the show ended in 2009, a compilation album of ten songs from the series, titled Somos tú y yo: un nuevo día was released.

In 2008, she was host of the television program, Día libre, broadcast by Venevisión and participated in the play, Anastasia and Princess Kira.

In 2009, she participated in the series, Somos tú y yo, un nuevo día, playing Nessa. The series is a spin-off of Somos tú y yo and was based on the American film Grease. The series was premiered on August 17, 2009 by the Boomerang.

In 2011, she was chosen by writer Alberto Barrera Tyszka to participate in her upcoming telenovela, El árbol de Gabriel, playing Marcela Brunatto. The filming of the telenovela on July 6, 2011 and premiered on September 8, 2011 by Venevisión in Venezuela. Subsequently, it premiered in Latin America, United States, Poland and Bulgaria.

In 2015, she played Giselle Machado in Venevisión's telenovela, Entre tu amor y mi amor, written by Carlos Pérez. The filming of the telenovela began on September 14, 2015, and premiered on June 15, 2016.

In 2017, she participated in the song «VIP», by singer Corina Smith and Gaby Noya.

== Filmography ==
=== Television ===
Year	Title	Role	Notes
2007–2008	Somos tú y yo	Vanessa Mejías	67 episodes
2009	Somos tú y yo, un nuevo día	Nessa	83 episodes
2011	El árbol de Gabriel	Marcela Brunatto	171 episodes
2015-2016	Entre tu amor y mi amor	Giselle Machado	111 episodes

== Theatre ==
Year	Play	Role
2008	Anastasia y la Princesa Kira	Herself
