= Adso =

Adso may refer to:

- Adso of Montier-en-Der (920–992), abbot of the Benedictine monastery of Montier-en-Der Abbey in France
- Adso of Melk, a character in The Name of the Rose
- ADSO (Application Development System Online), a tool used to expedite the writing and testing of modular applications using IDMS databases
