= El Paraíso stampede =

Nightclub violence in Venezuela in 2018

Coordinates: 10.4907°N 66.9337°W

- The location of El Paraíso in Caracas
- Date: 16 June 2018
- Location: Los Cotorros Club, Caracas, Venezuela
- Type: Stampede
- Cause: Tear gas canister
- Deaths: 19
- Injuries: 9+

The El Paraíso stampede was a stampede of more than 500 people that occurred in the early-morning hours of 16 June 2018 at the El Paraíso Social Club, also known as Los Cotorros Club, in the El Paraíso urbanization in Caracas, Venezuela. The stampede was the result of a tear gas canister being detonated during a brawl among a group of students from different schools celebrating their proms. At least 19 people died, and according to official police reports, they were caused by asphyxia and polytrauma.

== Background ==
Tear gas is strictly prohibited in Venezuela, except for use by the police and military. Media outlets have been the targets of tear gas attacks at their headquarters in the past, such as El Nacional and Globovisión. Pro-government groups known as colectivos have also been known to attack the opposition, once tear-gassing the Vatican envoy in 2009 after President Hugo Chávez accused the Roman Catholic Church of interfering with his government. News articles have reported that several of the devices and weapons are obtained by civilians through theft and by police or military corruption and that such items are used frequently by criminals.

There have been several reports of tear gas incidents without fatalities in 2018. In February 2018, tear gas was released in Caracas Metro stations on three occasions that authorities labeled as "acts of sabotage" to generate anxiety. A canister was dispersed in Plaza Venezuela, a transfer station for the system's main lines, and another was used in Petare several days later, a poor area in east Caracas. On 19 February 2018, a canister was detonated in Capuchinos station in west Caracas.

== Stampede ==
About 500 students gathered on the night of Friday 15 June 2018 in Los Cotorros Club at a "pre-graduation" event called The Legacy. The nightclub is a two-story brick building with barred windows and doors which has been a scene of violence in the past. The event was for people over age 18, though advertisements stated that minors could enter for an additional fee.

A group of young people left the bathroom arguing at 1:20 am VET, throwing punches and kicks. Some of them smashed bottles that they had in their hands and threatened their opponents with them. Party-goers nearby backed away from the scene, while the persons threatened ran towards the nightclub's staircase, threw a tear gas canister, and fled the building, causing a panic among the hundreds of people who sought to evade the tear gas.

The entrance to the club was a small, metal door located at the bottom of a set of stairs. This exit was closed, preventing the people from escaping the nightclub. Family members of the victims corroborated that the doors were closed after the tear gas canister was released, though no official statements were released. No emergency service personnel had arrived as of 2:30 am VET, despite several attempts to call 911. Around 2:40 am, a CICPC officer on a patrol arrived, drawing his gun and shouting, though he later began to aid with the evacuation of the club.

=== Victims ===
The initial information was published informally through statements by the Bolivarian National Police, the Bolivarian National Guard, and the CICPC; the death tolls varied between each agency. The National Guard specified that the teenagers died while they were being transported to health centers: 11 in the Miguel Pérez Carreño Hospital, three in the El Paraíso Popular Clinic, two in the Amay Clinic and one in the Loira Clinic.

Nazareth Duque, one of the survivors, said that three National Guardsmen were in the entrance of the nightclub, refused to help her and hit her in the face. According to Duque, more than 30 people died; one of the mothers of the victims estimated a toll of 34 deaths.

Eight of the deceased victims were younger than 18 years old, and suffered from either asphyxia or trauma of the stampede trying to escape the club.

== Aftermath ==
Asphyxiation was the cause of death for at least 11 of 21 fatalities that occurred during the stampede. As a result of shortages in Venezuela, family members stated that there were no medical supplies at area hospitals to treat victims of the stampede.

According to Interior Minister Néstor Reverol, eight people were detained, which included two minors, with one of the minors being responsible for the tear gas attack. The club was also closed by the Public Ministry to start the investigations, and its owner was arrested for not guaranteeing an adequate review of the assistants and after violating laws that prohibited taking weapons to public establishments. Questions were raised on how a minor was granted access to tear gas.

Néstor Reverol expressed his condolences to the victims, stating; "The Government of the Bolivarian Republic of Venezuela deplores this sad event and send condolences to the family members of the victims."

Opposition councilman Jesus Armas urged authorities to investigate whether the club had permission to hold several hundred people inside, stating "That's not a big space and that should not be authorized."

== See also ==
- List of human stampedes
- Neutro Shorty concert stampede
