= Alexandra Mey =

Venezuelan actress, model and singer

- Born: Claudia Alexandra Morales Mejías; 22 October 1992 (age 33); Caracas, Venezuela
- Other names: Claudia Morales (formerly; as an actress); Claudia Alexandra Morales (formerly; as a model)
- Occupations: actress, singer, fashion model, producer
- Years active: 2007
- Height: 1.78 m (5 ft 10 in)
- Relatives: Aída Yéspica; Juan Carlos García
- Website: soyclaudiamorales.com

Claudia Alexandra Morales Mejías, also known as Alexandra Mey (born 22 October 1992) is a Venezuelan actress, model, singer, composer and producer.

== Career ==
Alexandra Mey began her career as an actress in the play Fiddler on the Roof, at the Aula Magna of the Central University of Venezuela, before studying acting in the Teatro Luz in Caracas.

Her first television appearance was when she was aged 14, in the series Somos tú y yo. The show was a coproduction between Boomerang Latin America and Venevisión, and was broadcast in Latin America as well as Europe, the Middle East, and parts of Asia. Morales was featured on the soundtrack of the series, singing songs that would go on to be part of a Venezuelan national tour. The show premiered in Venezuela on 27 June 2007 on Venevisión, and its final episode was watched by approximately 5.9 million viewers, making it one of the channel's most successful shows. In Latin America and Europe the show premiered on 15 January 2008 on Boomerang. The final episode was broadcast on 15 December 2008, and received approximately 9.8 million viewers, the biggest audience received for any series finale on Latin American Boomerang. She remained in the cast for Somos tú y yo: un nuevo día, a spin-off, with both of them being based on the American film Grease. This premiered on 17 August 2009 on Boomerang Latin America.

In 2010, it was announced that Morales would play the lead, Katherina Petrov, in the Boomerang original series La Banda. The show was an adaptation of the Argentinian telenovela Rebelde Way. The show premiered on 25 July 2011 on Boomerang Latin America.

In 2013, she was announced as part of the main cast of the telenovela Las Bandidas, as Marisol Cáceres. The television was a new version of the 1985 Venezuelan telenovela Las amazonas, and was produced by RTI Producciones, as a coproduction with Televen, Televisa and RCN Televisión.

In 2016, Morales started the television production and artist representation agency CM Producciones.

== Filmography ==
Year(s)	Series	Channel	Role	Notes
2007–2009	Somos tú y yo	Venevisión / Boomerang	Claudia	Secondary antagonist
2009	Somos tú y yo: un nuevo día	Venevisión / Boomerang	Claudia	Pilot
2011	La Banda	Boomerang	Katherina Petrov	Protagonist
2011–2012	The Bold and the Beautiful	CBS	Claudia	2 episodes
2013	Las Bandidas	RCN Televisión / Televisa	Marisol Cáceres	Pilot
