= Me Rehúso =

Single by Danny Ocean

from the album 54+1
- Released: 16 September 2016
- Genre: Tropical house; dance-pop; Latin pop; Latin dancehall
- Length: 3:26
- Label: Atlantic
- Songwriter: Daniel Ocean
- Producer: Danny Ocean

Danny Ocean singles chronology
"Me Rehúso" (2016)	"Dembow" (2017)

Music video
- "Me Rehúso" on YouTube

"Me Rehúso" is a song by Venezuelan singer Danny Ocean. The song was released on 16 September 2016, and was re-released on 16 June 2017 through Atlantic Records, due to its late success in Latin America, Europe and the United States. It is the lead single of his debut studio album 54+1. It charted on the Spotify charts of all Latin American countries, being the first song by an independent artist to do so. The song's music video was released in 2017 and has received over 1.9 billion views on YouTube as of September 2025. On 15 June 2017, an English version titled "Baby I Won't" was released.

== Background and release ==
Ocean recorded the song on Valentine's Day. He had moved to Miami to escape the turmoil in his homeland, but the woman he liked, still in college at the time, couldn't come with him. The singer first released the song on YouTube and his main listeners were friends. Then, his manager also showed the song to his wife and Venezuelan TV host Osmariel Villalobos. In June 2017, Ocean signed a deal with Warner Music Group and re-released the song.

== Composition ==
"Me Rehúso" was written by Ocean, It opens "stealthily", with a pair of synthesizers that "vies for one's attention". Their interlocking pattern barely changes, allowing the song to maintain an illusion of stasis. Then, a lone sampled hand drum sound is added around the 40-second mark and a whiff of a reggaeton beat right before one minute has passed; suddenly, Ocean sings in a hungry, scratchy register and multi-tracking his own voice, "transforming his sleek, bare-bones instrumental into a vehicle for a crushing expression of heartache".

== Track listings ==
- Digital download
1. "Me Rehúso" – 3:26
- Digital download – English version
1. "Baby I Won't" – 3:26
- Digital download – English version remix
1. "Baby I Won't (Cean Remix)" – 3:34

== Charts ==
=== Weekly charts ===
Chart (2016–17)	Peak position
Argentina (CAPIF)	2
Argentina (Monitor Latino)	7
Bolivia (Monitor Latino)	8
Chile (Monitor Latino)	1
Colombia (National-Report)	6
Dominican Republic (Monitor Latino)	16
Ecuador (Monitor Latino)	19
Ecuador (National-Report)	13
El Salvador (Monitor Latino)	8
France (SNEP)	61
Germany (GfK)	67
Italy (FIMI)	5
Mexico (Billboard Mexican Airplay)	31
Mexico Streaming (AMPROFON)	1
Netherlands (Single Top 100)	82
Panama (Monitor Latino)	8
Paraguay (Monitor Latino)	5
Peru (Monitor Latino)	2
Portugal (AFP)	5
Spain (Promusicae)	3
Sweden (Sverigetopplistan)	96
Switzerland (Schweizer Hitparade)	34
Uruguay (Monitor Latino)	14
US Hot Latin Songs (Billboard)	13
US Latin Airplay (Billboard)	15
US Latin Pop Airplay (Billboard)	12

=== Year-end charts ===
Chart (2017)	Position
Argentina (CAPIF)	2
Argentina (Monitor Latino)	19
Italy (FIMI)	31
Mexico (AMPROFON)	1
Portugal (AFP)	32
Spain (PROMUSICAE)	3
US Hot Latin Songs (Billboard)	28

Chart (2018)	Position
Argentina (Monitor Latino)	49
El Salvador (Monitor Latino)	83
Portugal (AFP)	25
Spain (PROMUSICAE)	56

== Certifications ==
Region	Certification	Certified units/sales
Argentina (CAPIF)	Platinum	20,000^{*}
Canada (Music Canada)	2× Platinum	160,000^{‡}
France (SNEP)	Platinum	200,000^{‡}
Germany (BVMI)	Gold	200,000^{‡}
Italy (FIMI)	5× Platinum	250,000^{‡}
Portugal (AFP)	7× Platinum	175,000^{‡}
Spain (Promusicae)	10× Platinum	600,000^{‡}
Switzerland (IFPI Switzerland)	Platinum	30,000^{‡}
United Kingdom (BPI)	Silver	200,000^{‡}
United States (RIAA)	13× Platinum (Latin)	780,000^{‡}
Streaming
Chile (Profovi)	Diamond	43,000,000
^{*} Sales figures based on certification alone.^{‡} Sales+streaming figures based on certification alone.

== Release history ==
Region	Date	Version	Format	Label
Various	September 16, 2016	Original release	—N/a	—N/a
Various	June 15, 2017	English version	Digital download; streaming	Atlantic Records
Various	June 16, 2017	Re-release	Digital download; streaming	Atlantic Records
Various	November 10, 2017	Cean Remix (English version)	Digital download; streaming	Atlantic Records

== See also ==
- List of number-one songs of 2017 (Mexico)
