= Danny Ocean (singer) =

Venezuelan singer (born 1992)

- Ocean at the 2026 Montreux Jazz Festival

Background information
- Born: Daniel Alejandro Morales Reyes; 5 May 1992 (age 34); Caracas, Venezuela
- Genres: Reggaeton; dance-pop; moombahton; Latin pop
- Occupations: Singer; songwriter; record producer
- Instruments: Vocals; guitar; piano
- Years active: 2009–Present
- Label: Atlantic

Daniel Alejandro Morales Reyes (born 5 May 1992), known by his stage name Danny Ocean, is a Venezuelan singer, songwriter and record producer born in Caracas, Venezuela. He began his professional music career in 2009 with the creation of his YouTube channel.

He is best known for his song "Me Rehúso", released in September 2016, and relaunched as an English version titled "Baby I Won't" in 2017.

== Early life and education ==
Ocean was born in Caracas, Venezuela on 5 May 1992. He is the only child of a Venezuelan diplomat and a musician. He spent much of his childhood living in different countries due to his mother's diplomatic duties. He earned a graphic design degree from the Universidad Nueva Esparta in Venezuela. After graduating, he moved to Miami, Florida in the United States.

== Career ==
Danny Ocean began producing music in 2009 which he released on his YouTube channel under the pseudonym Danny O.C.T. During this time, he became interested in English language electronica. He published his first EP Paracaídas (2014) y U-YE (2015) on iTunes and Amazon Music. In 2016, he released the song "Me rehúso" (composed and produced by him). The track became a success in Europe, Latin America and the US. He released an English version titled "Baby, I Won't".

He also worked on the album Kloth Talk with hip hop and rap producer DJ Katastraphy and on the song "Replay" with rapper and singer Bri Nichole and rappers Rello Muse and Philup Banks. He worked with British DJ Nicholas Gale on the track "Lookin' For". In June 2017, Ocean signed with Atlantic Records for his English language music and Red Wine Records LLC. and [Warner Music for his Spanish language music. At the end of 2017, he released music videos of "Me Rehúso" and "Baby I Won't" and released the promotional singles "Veneno", "Vuelve" and "Dembow". In August 2018, he released a video "Epa Wei", produced with Skrillex. In November 2018, he appeared on the Coldplay EP Global Citizen – EP 1 on the song "Voodoo" with David Guetta, Stargate, Tiwa Savage and Wizkid.

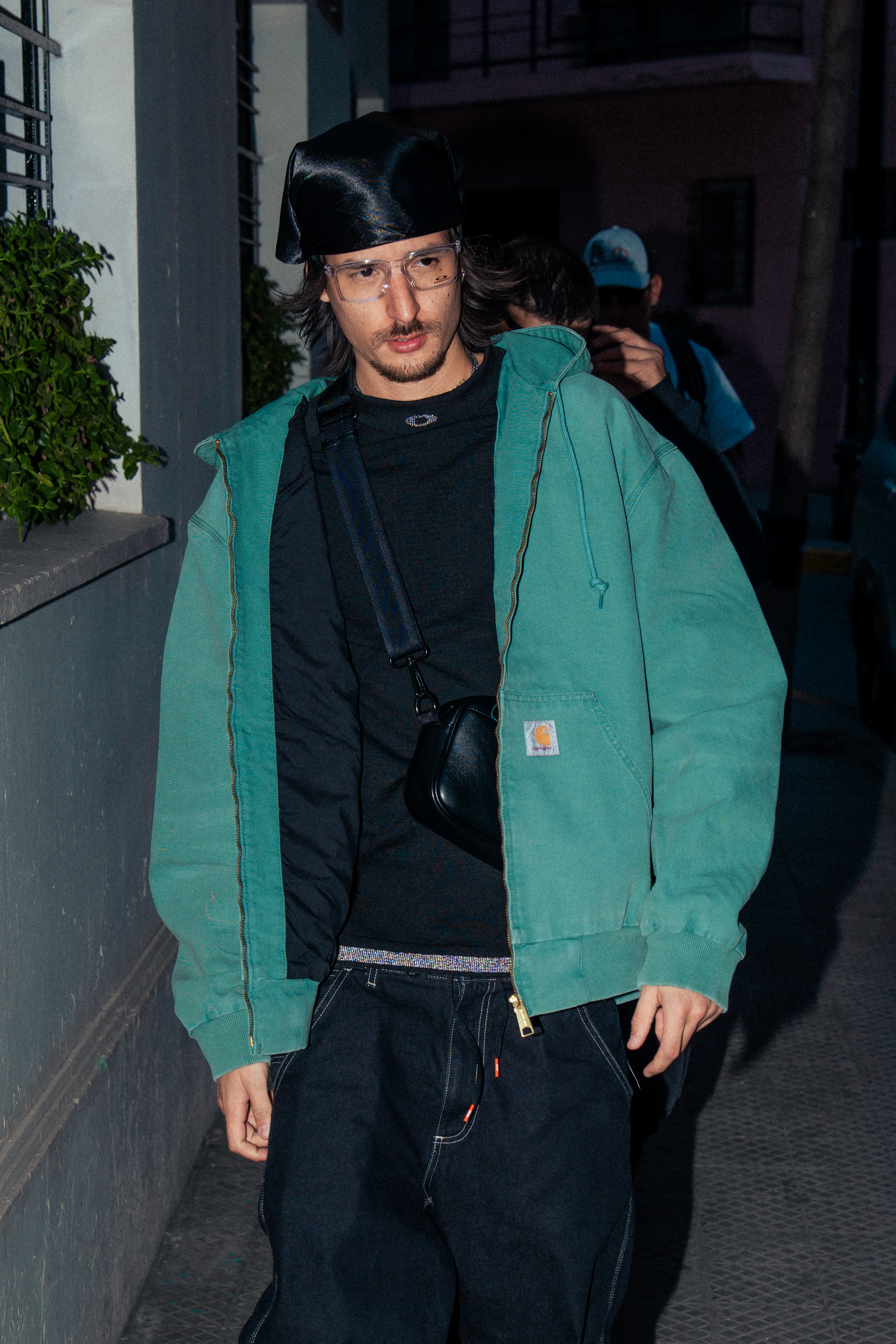
Danny Ocean in Chile in 2025

In 2019, he released the promotional single "Swing" and his debut album 54+1, self-produced and mastered by Ricardo Sangiao. On 25 October 2019, Ocean launched the single titled "Dime tú" with the help of Venezuelan singer Maye, daughter of singer Fernando Osorio.

That same year, Ocean also featured on "Detente" from Colombian singer Mike Bahía's debut album Navegando. Additionally, he collaborated with Fuse ODG and Ed Sheeran on the song "Lazy Day".

In 2020, Ocean released another single entitled "Que lo qué". He released the song "Cuando Amanezca" in collaboration with Justin Quiles, Feid and Nibal. Due to the COVID-19 pandemic, he recorded his video for "Báilame" from 54+1 at his home in Miami. In July 2020, Ocean co-wrote the song "Ay, DiOs Mío!" for Karol G. After these releases, Ocean became even more popular; him and his music.

Danny Ocean performing in 2026 in Chicago

On July 18th, 2024, the artist released an EP called "venequia," featuring an acoustic version of "Me rehúso" and another version of "Dime tú" along with five new songs. The EP was meant to represent a symbol of hope and show the status of Venezuela right before the upcoming presidential elections.

On December 4th, 2025, Ocean was announced to perform at the 2025 Nobel Peace Prize award ceremony on the 10 December. This comes right after María Corina Machado, a Venezuelan opposition leader, was named the 2025 Nobel Peace Prize recipient. According to a press statement, “The ceremony will bring them together as representatives of a generation of Venezuelans who promote a message of resilience, unity, and hope." Danny Ocean performed a composition of "Alma llanera", considered popularly as the second anthem of Venezuela, and "Venezuela", which has become a Venezuelan diaspora song.

On June 11, 2026 Danny Ocean along with other artists preformed at the World Cup opening ceremony. He sang his new song “Partidazo” along with dancers and other singers like Shakira and J Balvin. He is one of the first Venezuelan artists to preform in a world class stage. Before his performance he tweeted that he was going to have all his people in his heart.

== Discography ==
=== Studio albums ===
List of studio albums
Title	Album details	Certifications
54 + 1	Released: 22 March 2019; Label: Atlantic; Format: CD, digital download	RIAA: 3× Platinum (Latin)
@dannocean	Released: 18 February 2022; Label: Atlantic; Format: CD, digital download	
@dannocean 2	Released: 11 November 2022; Label: Atlantic; Format: CD, digital download	
Reflexa	Released: 2 May 2024; Label: Atlantic; Format: CD, digital download	
Babylon Club	Released: 31 July 2025; Label: Atlantic; Format: Digital download, streaming	RIAA: Platinum (Latin); PROMUSICAE: Gold

=== Extended plays ===
List of extended plays
Title	Details
Backstage (as Danny O.C.T.)	Released: 2009
Paracaídas (as Danny O.C.T)	Released: 2014
Sin Intención (as Danny O.C.T.)	Released: 2014
U-YE (as Danny O.C.T.)	Released: 2015
Pronto (as Danny O.C.T.)	Released: 2015
Venequia.	Released: 18 July 2024; Label: Atlantic; Format: Digital download, streaming
Babylona Blue	Released: 18 June 2026

=== Singles ===
==== As lead artist ====
List of singles as lead artist, with selected chart positions and certifications, showing year released and album name
Title	Year	Peak chart positions										Certifications	Album
Title	Year	ARG	COL	ITA	MEX	NLD	SPA	SWE	SWI	US Latin	US Latin Pop	Certifications	Album
"Me Rehúso" / "Baby I Won't"	2016	7	6	5	1	82	2	96	34	13	19	CAPIF: Platinum; FIMI: 5× Platinum; PROMUSICAE: 10× Platinum; RIAA: 13× Platinum (Latin); APDIF: 19x Diamante; BPI: Silver	54+1
"Vuelve"	2017	—	—	—	—	—	—	—	—	—	—	RIAA: Platinum (Latin)	54+1
"Dembow"	2017	—	—	—	—	—	19	—	—	—	—	PROMUSICAE: 3× Platinum; RIAA: 5× Platinum (Latin)	54+1
"Epa Wei"	2018	—	—	—	—	—	—	—	—	—	—	RIAA: 2× Platinum (Latin); PROMUSICAE: Gold	Non-album single
"Swing"	2019	62	—	—	—	—	16	—	—	—	—	PROMUSICAE: 3× Platinum; RIAA: 2× Platinum (Latin)	54+1
"Lookin' For" (with Digital Farm Animals)	2019	—	—	—	—	—	—	—	—	—	—		Non-album single
"Dime Tú"	2019	95	69	—	—	—	—	—	—	—	—		Venequia.
"Detente" (with Mike Bahía)	2019	—	—	—	—	—	—	—	—	—	—	RIAA: Platinum (Latin)	Navegando
"Que lo Que"	2020	—	—	—	—	—	—	—	—	—	—		Non-album single
"Cuando Amanezca" (with Nibal, Justin Quiles and Feid)	2020	—	—	—	—	—	—	—	—	—	—		Viaje
"Báilame"	2020	—	—	—	—	—	—	—	—	—	—		54+1
"Midsummer Madness 20 (Remix)" (with 88rising featuring Joji, Rich Brian, August 08 and Higher Brothers)	2020	—	—	—	—	—	—	—	—	—	—		Non-album singles
"Miedito o Qué?" (with Ovy On The Drums featuring Karol G)	2020	—	—	—	—	—	—	—	—	—	—	RIAA: Platinum (Latin)	Non-album singles
"Pronto"	2021	—	—	—	—	—	—	—	—	—	—	RIAA: Gold (Latin)	@dannocean
"Cuántas Veces" (with Justin Quiles)	2021	—	—	—	—	—	—	—	—	—	—	RIAA: Gold (Latin)	@dannocean
"Besarnos de Cero"	2021	—	—	—	—	—	—	—	—	—	—		@dannocean
"Mónaco" (with Lagos)	2021	—	—	—	—	—	—	—	—	—	—	RIAA: 6× Platinum (Latin)	Clásicos
"Báilame en los Besos" (with Dylan Fuentes and Daramola)	2021	—	—	—	—	—	—	—	—	—	—		Non-album single
"Apartamento"	2021	—	—	—	—	—	—	—	—	—	—		@dannocean
"Tú No Me Conoces" (with TINI)	2021	—	—	—	—	—	—	—	—	—	—		@dannocean
"Dorito & Coca-Cola" (with Tokischa)	2021	—	—	—	—	—	—	—	—	—	—		@dannocean
"Amapolas (Remix)" (with Leo Rizzi)	2021	—	—	—	—	—	—	—	—	—	—		Non-album single
"Rubia Sol Morena Luna v2"	2021	—	—	—	—	—	—	—	—	—	—		@dannocean
"Istanbul"	2022	—	—	—	—	—	—	—	—	—	—		@dannocean
"Fuera del Mercado"	2022	36	16	60	1	—	7	—	—	33	—	AMPROFON: Diamond+2× Platinum+Gold; FIMI: Platinum; PROMUSICAE: 3× Platinum; RIAA: 2× Platinum (Latin)	@dannocean
"Velocidad" (with Akapellah and Foreign Teck)	2022	—	—	—	—	—	—	—	—	—	—		Respira
"Brisa" (with Zion & Lennox)	2022	—	—	—	—	—	—	—	—	—	—		Non-album single
"Fino" (with Llane)	2022	—	—	—	—	—	—	—	—	—	—		Fino
"Volare"	2022	—	—	—	—	—	—	—	—	—	—	• PROMUSICAE: Gold	@dannocean2
"Chimbo" (with Big Soto)	2022	—	—	—	—	—	—	—	—	—	—		Todo es Mental
"Bebe"	2022	—	—	—	—	—	—	—	—	—	—		@dannocean2
"Felices Perdidos" (with Piso 21)	2022	—	—	—	—	—	—	—	—	—	—	RIAA: Gold (Latin)	777
"Amor Tonight"	2022	—	—	—	—	—	—	—	—	—	—		Non-album singles
"Emeycé" (with 3AM)	2023	—	—	—	—	—	—	—	—	—	—		Non-album singles
"Binikini" (with Rawayana)	2023	—	—	—	—	—	—	—	—	—	—		¿Quien Trae las Cornetas?
"No Me Controles" (with Rvssian and Sean Paul)	2023	—	—	—	—	—	—	—	—	—	—		Non-album single
"Correcaminos" (with Alejandro Sanz)	2023	—	—	—	—	—	—	—	—	—	—		Correcaminos EP
"Zha" (with Greeicy)	2023	—	—	—	—	—	—	—	—	—	—		Yeliana
"Caracas en el 2000" (with Elena Rose and Jerry Di)	2023	—	—	—	—	—	—	—	—	—	—	RIAA: Gold (Latin)	Non-album single
"No Te Enamores de Él"	2023	—	—	—	—	—	—	—	—	—	—		Reflexa
"Medio Friends"	2024	—	—	—	—	—	—	—	—	—	—		Reflexa
"Amor"	2024	—	—	—	—	—	—	—	—	—	—	RIAA: Gold (Latin)	Reflexa
"Cero Condiciones"	2024	—	—	—	—	—	—	—	—	—	—		Reflexa
"Bailarina" (with Abraham Mateo)	2024	—	—	—	—	—	—	—	—	—	—		Insomnio
"Ley Universal"	2024	—	—	—	—	—	—	—	—	—	—		Reflexa
"Imaginate" (with Kapo)	2024	40	—	—	—	—	12	—	—	32	1	RIAA: 5× Platinum (Latin)	Babylon Club
"Un Blues" (with Zulia)	2024												Aviso de Despido
"Vitamina"	2025	—	—	—	—	—	67	—	—	—	—	• PROMUSICAE: Gold	Babylon Club
"Priti" (with Sech)	2025	—	—	—	—	—	23	—	—	—	—		Babylon Club
"Samaná" (with Mau y Ricky and Yorghaki)	2025	–											La Llave
"Ponme en tu boca" (with Jerry Di and Corina Smith)	2025	–											Non-album single
"AyMami" (with Kenia Os)	2025	–											Babylon Club
"Llego" (with Empire of the Sun)	2026	—	—	—	—	—	—	—	—	—	—		
"—" denotes a recording that did not chart or was not released in that territory.

==== As featured artist ====
List of singles as featured artist, showing year and album name
Title	Year	Album
"Replay" (DJ Katastraphy featuring Danny Ocean, Bri Nichole, Rello Muse & Philup Banks)	2016	Non-album single
"Voodoo" (Stargate and Los Unidades featuring Tiwa Savage, Wizkid, Danny Ocean and David Guetta)	2019	Global Citizen – EP 1
"Lazy Day" (Fuse ODG featuring Danny Ocean)	2019	Non-album single
“No Eres Tú Soy Yo” (Maria Becerra featuring Danny Ocean)	2021	Animal
“Picó” (Yera and Blackie & Lois featuring Danny Ocean)	2021	Non-album single
"Paciente por ti" (Jambene featuring Danny Ocean)	2023	Dimelo, Mike

=== Guest appearances ===
Title	Year	Other artists	Album
"4:22"	2022	Ozuna	Ozutochi
"Eivissa"	2022	Mora	Paraíso
"Cosquillas"	2023	Paula Cendejas	Fomo
"Hoy es tu cumpleaños"	2025	Aitana	Cuarto Azul
"ENTRÉGAME"	2026	Chino & Nacho	Radio Venezuela
"CANAIMA"	2026	Big Soto	Nostalgia City

=== Other songs ===
- "Eres Tú La Musa" (Ft. ZsW ZeroSWar) as Danny O.C.T.
- "Ese Lugar" (Ft. Oma) as Danny O.C.T.
- "Demasiado Tarde" (Ft. KC Clan) as Danny O.C.T.
- "Un Cigarro"
- "Sunday Morning Driving"
- "120 Kilómetros"
- "Mueve Tu Cuerpo"
- "OXES"

=== Songwriting credits ===
- "Raptame"
- "Mamacita"
- "Ay, Dios mío!"
- "Milímetros"
- "Cambiate el nombre"
- "Machu Picchu"
- "DVD"

== Awards and Nominations ==
Year	Award	Category	Works	Result
2017	Premios Juventud	Artist Revelation	Himself	Nominated
2017	Kids' Choice Awards México	Favorite Song	"Me Rehúso"	Nominated
2017	MTV MIAW Awards	Best Party Anthem	"Me Rehúso"	Nominated
2017	Kids' Choice Awards Colombia	Favorite Song	"Me Rehúso"	Nominated
2018	Pepsi Venezuela Music Awards	Tema Pop	"Me Rehúso"	Won
2018	Pepsi Venezuela Music Awards	Artist Revelation	Himself	Nominated
2018	IHeartRadio Music Awards	Best New Latin Artist	Himself	Nominated
2020	Billboard Latin Music Awards	Latin Pop Album of the Year	54+1	Nominated
2020	Premios Juventud	The Quarentune (Songs born during quarantine)	"Cuando Amanezca"	Nominated
2021	Latin ASCAP Music Awards 2021	Award for Composition	"Ay, Dios Mio!"	Won
2022	Premios Juventud	Best Social Dance Challenge	"Fuera del Mercado"	Nominated
2022	Heat Latin Music Awards	Best Artist Andean Region	Himself	Won
2022	MTV Europe Music Awards	Best Latin America Central Act	Himself	Won
2022	Los 40 Music Awards 2022	Best Act "Global Latin"	Himself	Nominated
2022	Heat Latin Music Awards 2022	Best Artist Andean Region	Himself	Won
2022	MTV MIAW Awards	Flow Artist	Himself	Nominated
2022	MTV MIAW Awards	Viral Anthem	"Fuera del Mercado"	Nominated
2023	Latin American Music Awards 2023	Favorite Pop Album	@dannocean	Nominated
2023	24th Annual Latin Grammy Awards	Record of the Year	"Correcaminos" (with Alejandro Sanz)	Nominated
2024	TikTok Awards	Artist of the Year	Himself	Won
2024	Premios Juventud	Best Pop/Urban Song	"No Te Enamores de Él"	Nominated
2024	Heat Latin Music Awards 2024	Best Artist Andean Region	Himself	Won
2024	MTV MIAW Awards	Pop Explosion	Himself	Nominated
2024	Billboard Latin Music Awards	Latin Pop Song of the Year	"Amor"	Nominated
2024	25th Annual Latin Grammy Awards	Song of the Year	"Caracas en el 2000"	Nominated
2024	25th Annual Latin Grammy Awards	Best Pop Song	"Amor"	Nominated
2025	Premio Lo Nuestro 2025	Male Pop Artist of the Year	Himself	Nominated
2025	Premio Lo Nuestro 2025	Pop/Urban Album of the Year	"Reflexa"	Nominated
2025	Premio Lo Nuestro 2025	Pop/Urban Song of the Year	"Amor"	Nominated
2025	Heat Latin Music Awards	Best Artist Andean Region	Himself	Nominated
2025	Premios Nuestra Tierra	Premio "Hermano de Nuestro Tierra"	Himself	Won
2025	Premios Tu Música Urbano	Male Rising Star	Himself	Nominated
2025	Premios Tu Música Urbano	Best Pop Artist	Himself	Nominated
2025	Premios Tu Música Urbano	Best Pop Song	"Amor"	Nominated
2025	Premios Tu Música Urbano	Best Afrobeat Song	"Imagínate"	Nominated
2025	Premios Juventud	Best Pop/Urban Song	"Priti"	Nominated
2025	Premios Juventud	Best Pop Song	"Samaná"	Nominated
2025	Premios Juventud	Best Pop/Rhythmic Song	"Ley Universal"	Nominated
2025	Premios Juventud	Best Pop Album	Reflexa	Nominated
2025	Premios Juventud	Tropical Hit	"Imagínate"	Nominated
2025	Premios Juventud	Latin Afrobeat Of the Year	"Amor"	Won
2025	Billboard Latin Music Awards	Latin Pop Artist Of the Year, Solo	Himself	Nominated
2025	Billboard Latin Music Awards	Latin Pop Song Of the Year	"Imagínate"	Nominated
2025	Billboard Latin Music Awards	Top Latin Pop Album Of the Year	Babylon Club	Nominated
2025	Los 40 Music Awards 2025	Best Music Video	Priti	Nominated
2025	Los 40 Music Awards 2025	Best Latin Album	Babylon Club	Nominated
2025	Los 40 Music Awards 2025	Best Latin Colaboration	"Imagínate"	Won
2026	Premio Lo Nuestro 2026	Song Of The Year	"Imagínate"	Nominated
2026	Premio Lo Nuestro 2026	Album Of The Year	Babylon Club	Nominated
2026	Premio Lo Nuestro 2026	Male Artist Of The Year	Himself	Nominated
2026	Premio Lo Nuestro 2026	Pop/Urban Colaboration Of The Year	Samaná	Nominated
2026	Premios Tu Música Urbano	Male Pop Artist	Himself	Nominated
2026	Premios Tu Música Urbano	Duo/Group Song Of The Year	Samaná	Nominated
2026	Premios Tu Música Urbano	Pop Song	Corazón	Nominated
2026	Premios Tu Música Urbano	Tropical Song	Crayola	Nominated
2026	Premios Tu Música Urbano	Male Album Of The Year	Babylon Club	Nominated
2026	Premios Juventud 2026	Premios Juventud Male Artist	Himself	Nominated
2026	Premios Juventud 2026	Mi Track Favorito	Corazón	Nominated
2026	Premios Juventud 2026	Album Of The Year	Babylon Club	Nominated
2026	Latin ASCAP Music Awards 2026	Award for Composition	"Imagínate"	Won
2026	27th Annual Latin Grammy Awards	Best Tropical Song	Crayola	Pending
2026	Heat Latin Music Awards	Best Male Artist	Himself	Pending
2026	Heat Latin Music Awards	Best Pop Artist	Himself	Pending
