= Global Citizen – EP 1 =

2018 extended play by Los Unidades

EP by Los Unidades and Various Artists
- Released: 30 November 2018
- Genre: World music; pop rock
- Length: 14:18
- Label: Parlophone; Global Poverty Project
- Producer: Coldplay (exec.); Stargate; Rik Simpson; Mike Larson; Daniel Green; Bill Rahko

Coldplay chronology
Kaleidoscope EP (2017)	Global Citizen – EP 1 (2018)	Live in Buenos Aires (2018)

Global Citizen – EP 1 is the fourteenth extended play by British rock band Coldplay and their first release under the pseudonym Los Unidades. The project was made available worldwide on 30 November 2018 featuring production by Rik Simpson and musical guests including Pharrell Williams, David Guetta, Stargate and others.

It was released as part of the lead-up to the group's performance at the "Mandela 100" Global Citizen Festival, which happened on 2 December 2018, in South Africa. All proceeds from the EP were donated to Global Citizen, an international education and advocacy organization working to catalyze the movement to end extreme poverty.

== Background ==
The trademark Los Unidades was filed by Coldplay in late 2017.

"For hundreds of years, we have witnessed the power of music in bringing people together to drive activism and demand change [...] we are thrilled to release Global Citizen EP 1 with new songs from these incredible artists who stand with us in the fight to defeat extreme poverty, and we are extremely grateful to Dave Holmes, Parlophone Records and Atlantic Records for their dedicated partnership and support as we demand to see an end to extreme poverty by 2030".

— Hugh Evans, CEO of Global Citizen

== Track listing ==
Global Citizen – EP 1 track listing
No.	Title	Writer(s)	Artist(s)	Length
1.	"Rise Up"	Stargate; Nelson Mandela	Stargate featuring Nelson Mandela	3:03
2.	"E-Lo"	Coldplay; Jocelyn Donaldson; Letta Mbulu	Los Unidades featuring Jozzy and Pharrell Williams	3:34
3.	"Timbuktu"	Caiphus Semenya; Coldplay; Clarence Charles; Michael Owuo Jr.	Los Unidades featuring Stormzy, Jess Kent and Cassper Nyovest	3:44
4.	"Voodoo"	Ayodeji Ibrahim Balogun; Coldplay; David Guetta; Daniel Morales; Stargate; Tiwatope Savage	Los Unidades featuring Stargate, Tiwa Savage, Wizkid, Danny Ocean and David Guetta	3:57
Total length:				14:18

== Personnel ==
Credits adapted from the digital liner notes.

Los Unidades

- Chris Martin – lead vocals, keyboards, acoustic guitar (tracks 2, 3 and 4)
- Jonny Buckland – electric guitar (tracks 2, 3 and 4)
- Guy Berryman – bass guitar (tracks 2, 3 and 4)
- Will Champion – drums, drum pad, percussion, backing vocals (tracks 2, 3 and 4)

Additional musicians

- Stargate (tracks 1 and 4)
- Nelson Mandela – backing vocals (track 1)
- Pharrell Williams – backing vocals (track 2)
- Jozzy – vocals (track 2)
- Cassper Nyovest – vocals (track 3)
- Stormzy – vocals (track 3)
- Jess Kent – vocals (track 3)
- Tiwa Savage – backing vocals (track 4)
- WizKid – vocals (track 4)
- Danny Ocean – vocals (track 4)
- David Guetta – backing vocals (track 4)

Production

- Coldplay – executive production
- Stargate – production
- Rik Simpson – production
- Mike Larson – production
- Daniel Green – production
- Bill Rahko – production
