= Kelly Durán =

Venezuelan actress

- Born: Kelly Karina Durán Da Costa; 31 January 1989 (age 37); Caracas, Venezuela
- Occupation: Actress
- Years active: 2007-2009
- Employer: Venevisión
- Spouse: Alexa Lizarazo
- Parent(s): Carlos Durán; Kettsy Da Costa

Kelly Durán Da Costa (born 31 January 1989) is a Venezuelan actress known for playing Kelly in the teen television series Somos tú y yo.

== Biography ==
She is the daughter of Carlos Eduardo Durán Maldonado (1968) and Kettsy Da Costa De Jesús (1968). She has one sister, Kettsy Carolina, and three half-siblings: María Victoria Durán León, Karen Michelle Luis, and Fernando José Luis.

She appeared in all three seasons of the television series Somos tú y yo, where she played the lead role of Kelly Mendoza.

On 28 January 2013 she began a romantic relationship with Alexa Lizarazo. In mid-2015 she came out as lesbian. On 6 October 2017 they got engaged on Margarita Island, and on 7 November of that year they were married in Portugal. On 18 May 2024, she announced that she was pregnant, and on 18 November her son Alex Matteo was born.

== Filmography ==
- Somos tú y yo, Kelly Mendoza (television series)
