= Big Soto =

- Also known as: Big Soto
- Born: Gustavo Rafael Guerrero Soto; 19 October 1996 (age 29)
- Origin: Venezuela
- Genres: Reggaeton; Latin trap
- Occupations: Rapper; Singer; Songwriter; Musical producer; Influencer
- Years active: 2013–present
- Label: Rimas

Gustavo Rafael Guerrero Soto (born 19 October 1996), known professionally as Big Soto, is a Venezuelan rapper, singer and songwriter of urban genre.

He is currently considered one of the pioneers of Latin trap in America and his incursion into this genre has made him one of the first interpreters of the genre in Venezuela, having more than 4.5 million monthly reproductions on Spotify.

== Biography ==
Soto was born in Cumaná, Sucre State, Venezuela, although he lived part of his childhood in a small town called Marigüitar. At the age of 9 he moved with his family to Valles Del Tuy. His artistic name is a tribute to his maternal family, the Sotos, who, in addition to being musicians, promoted and supported him in his artistic career. At first his name was going to be just Soto, but influenced by the movement of rappers who added "Little", "Lil" or "Big" to their stage names, he decided to add "Big" to his and call himself "Big Soto".

== Musical career ==
=== Beginning ===
His first rhymes began in street battles of rappers in 2013, in that year he also began his studies in audiovisual sciences at IUTIRLA while organizing events for local rappers. After a couple of years of dedicating himself to street freestyle, at the age of 20 he decided to dedicate himself fully to music and drop out of university in the fourth semester of his studies. At the beginning of his career he traveled from Valles del Tuy to Caracas to record his demos in home studios. Big Soto's first song was "Exposicion" in 2014.

=== 2015-2017: "Chamito Loco", "Skrt" and Young Cream ===
The first single to put him on the music scene was "Chamito Loco", released in 2016 and performed with Trainer. Upon meeting the rapper Trainer, he became associated with the Eleuce Music project, a creative collective from which they would both leave shortly after to continue working as soloists. In that same year he also met Micro TDH, a Venezuelan singer with whom he shares a great affinity for the musical style. With this he has songs like "Ponte" and "Caderas".

In that same year he released his first studio album entitled Young Cream, this had 13 singles and collaborations with artists such as Episteme, Trainer, Foreign, Rusty, among others. 10 days after the premiere, he released "ISKIUSMI Panita", together with Adso Alejandro and Trainer, this would be a single that would boost the recognition of these artists.

In 2017 both soloists left Eleuce Music and went to OBG, a project that promoted him in the national trap. OBG was a group led by Akapellah created with the aim of promoting rappers on the national scene. Big Soto presented his first single under the record label titled "SKRT", this has more than 13 million views on YouTube. After this, he released singles that consecrated him in the Latin trap such as "Funny" with Trainer, "Vida Buena", "Chipi Chipi", "UFO", "Party", among others.

=== 2018-2020: Apokalypsis and Rimas Entertainment ===
His musical relationship with fellow rapper Neutro Shorty began in 2018 when they met at a show in which they both performed. Their joint release, Apokalypsis is a work in which each of the eight songs that make up the album is accompanied by a video clip. In 2018 he was signed by Rimas Entertainment from Puerto Rico and added songs to his catalog such as "Aquella Noche", "Perdón Mama", "Me Niego ft. Mora", "Truth" and "Rude". In that same year he also collaborated with Jeeiph and Trainer on the single "Lirica".

In 2019 he arrived in the Dominican Republic to continue working on his musical career, to later reside in Mexico City, with the intention of continuing to grow in his musical career at the hands of Rimas Entertainment. In addition to the great push that social networks give him, Big Soto has been characterized by collaborating with other artists such as Trainer, Corina Smith, Micro TDH, Neutro Shorty, Mora, Akapellah, De La Ghetto, Álvaro Díaz, Khea, Randy Nota Loca, Sharlene, entre otros.

At the beginning of the year 2020 he launched "Tiempos de Cali". In May of that same year, he collaborated with the artist Bizarrap for his BZRP Music Sessions #28, which in just one day achieved more than two million views and currently has fifty-six.

=== 2021-present: The Good Trip ===
In 2021 he released his second album called The Good Trip, an album that began to be produced at the end of 2018, in which Soto is found in collaboration with artists such as Jowell & Randy, Farruko, Noriel, Micro TDH, Eladio Carrión, Trainer, Javiielo, Lyanno, Suei, Amenazzy, among others. The Good Trip means the good trip, in each song you can see himself in countries like Spain, the United Arab Emirates, among others. The album was listed by Rolling Stone magazine as one of the 35 best Spanish and bilingual albums of 2021.

== Art ==
=== Lyrical and musical style ===
When he began his career, Soto ventured into trap, and this was what gave him international recognition. However, he has a great devotion to hip hop, rap, R&B, and African-American music in general. Some artists that have been part of his growth as an artist are Gorillaz, Slipknot, System of Down and the Brazilian band Angra. When he started listening to Young Thug, A$AP Rocky, The Underachievers, Migos and Flatbush Zombies he decided to stay in trap. From the beginning of his musical career, he showed great interest in knowing behind the scenes of the entire process, learning about programming, sampling, mixing and construction of music.

=== Image ===
Big Soto was always influenced by the style of skater and urban clothing. He is a model signed with the global brand Fashion Nova since 2020 and on social networks he is shown with a wide variety of clothing from the same.

== Discography ==
Since he began his career in 2013, Soto has managed to amass two (2) studio albums and one (1) extended play.

=== Studio albums ===
- 2016 — Young Cream
- 2021 — The Good Trip
- 2024 - SOTORIUS
- 2026 - NOSTALGIA CITY

=== EPs ===
- 2019 — Apokalypsis (with Neutro Shorty)
