= Colegio El Ángel =

School in Chuao, Caracas, Venezuela

Coordinates: 10.477916°N 66.840125°W

Unidad Educativa Colegio El Ángel U.E. C.E.A is a school in Chuao, Caracas, Venezuela. The school has its origins in the old "Santo Ángel de la Guarda" School, founded by the religious congregation of the same name. It was run by the nuns until 1976, year in which the school was sold and its name changed to the actual one.

It is also known as a voting center for the community of Chuao.
