= Edgar Bastidas =

Venezuelan tenor (born 1969)

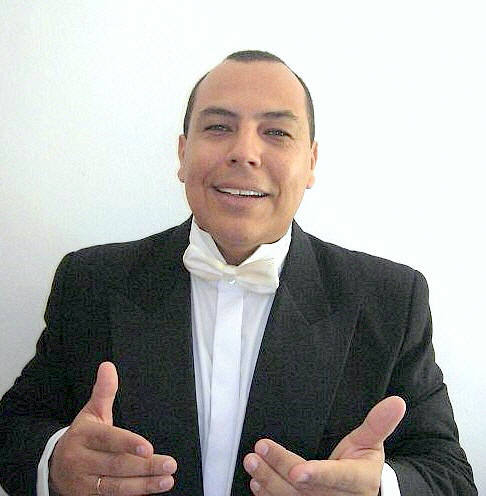
Edgar Bastidas, tenor . 2006

Edgar Bastidas (born 23 August 1969 in Caracas, Distrito Capital) is a Venezuelan tenor.

He studied in the musical institute Mikhail Glinka in Dnipropetrovsk (now Dnipro) in Ukraine, with the teacher María E. Markina. He studied from 1991 to 1995 in the Kiev State Conservatory "Piotr I. Tchaikovsky" in Ukraine, with the Ukraine Professor Vladimir I. Timohin. He began his career in the Opera Studio of the same Conservatory, as a soloist, interpreting Lensky in the opera Eugene Onegin, Alfredo in La Traviata, Almaviva in The Barber of Seville, and the Duke of Mantua in Rigoletto.

He has worked with many distinguished conductors including Lev Gorvatenko, Ruslan Doroyivsky, Roman Koffman, Boris Velat, Jan Drietomsky, and Pablo Castellanos. He has carried out presentations in European theaters interpreting leading roles such as Almaviva, Nemorino, Duca di Mantova, Gringoire and Alfredo. Bastidas's repertoire encompasses lieder, Spanish Songs, Russian songs, Latin American songs, contemporary, Italian and Neapolitan songs.

== Repertoire ==
- Rossini: Il Barbiere di Siviglia – (Conte Almaviva)
- Donizetti: L'Elisir d'amore – (Nemorino)
- Donizetti: Lucia di Lammermoor – (Edgardo)
- Verdi: La Traviata – (Alfredo)
- Verdi: Rigoletto – (Duque de Mantua)
- Verdi: Macbeth – (Macduff)
- Massenet: Werther – (Werther)
- Tchaikovsky: Eugene Oneguin – (Lensky)
- Rachmaninov: Aleko – (Young Gypsy)
- Mascagni: Cavallería Rusticana – (Turiddu )
- Puccini: La Bohème (Rodolfo)
- Puccini: Madama Butterfly (Pinkerton)
- Gounod: Fausto – (Fausto)
