= Rosangélica Piscitelli =

Venezuelan actress, model and beauty pageant titleholder

- Born: Rosangélica Piscitelli Ferreri; September 3, 1993 (age 33); Los Teques, Miranda, Venezuela
- Occupation: Model
- Height: 1.78 m (5 ft 10 in)
- Beauty pageant titleholder
- Title: Miss Miranda 2016
- Hair color: Light Brown
- Eye color: Green
- Major competitions: Miss Venezuela 2016 (4th Runner-Up)

Rosangélica Piscitelli Ferreri (born September 3, 1993) is a Venezuelan actress, model and beauty pageant titleholder who was 4th Runner-Up at Miss Venezuela 2016. She represented the state of Miranda at the pageant of Miss Venezuela 2016 .

== Early life ==
Rosangélica Piscitelli was born on September 3, 1993, in Los Teques, Venezuela, but she grew up in the city of Caracas from a very young age. She has Italian ancestry. Rosangélica from small the arts have interested her, declaring to her parents that she wanted to be an artist.

== Pageantry ==
=== Miss Miranda 2016 ===
Rosangélica participated in the first edition of Miss Miranda 2016 regional beauty contest representing the Guaicaipuro Municipality where she obtained the special bands of "Miss Fotogénica" and "Miss Internet". On the final night of the contest held on May 5 at the Eurobuilding Hotel & Suites, Caracas; manages to position itself among the three finalists allowing a direct pass to the Miss Venezuela 2016.

Finally, in the official presentation to the press of the candidates for Miss Venezuela 2016, it turns out to be the winner obtaining the right to represent Miranda State in the Miss Venezuela 2016.

=== Miss Venezuela 2016 ===
During the interactive gala of Miss Venezuela 2016, an event prior to the final night of the contest, Rosangélica won the special bands of "Miss Rostro", "Miss Online" and "Miss Belleza Integral". Days later in a special event a new special band was awarded "Miss Salud y Estética" which fell on her.

The final of the Miss Venezuela 2016 took place in Venevisión, Caracas; the night of October 5 where Rosangélica was positioned as the fourth finalist obtaining also the bands of "Miss Elegance" and "Miss Photogenic".
