= Rosmeri Marval =

Venezuelan actress and model (born 1991)

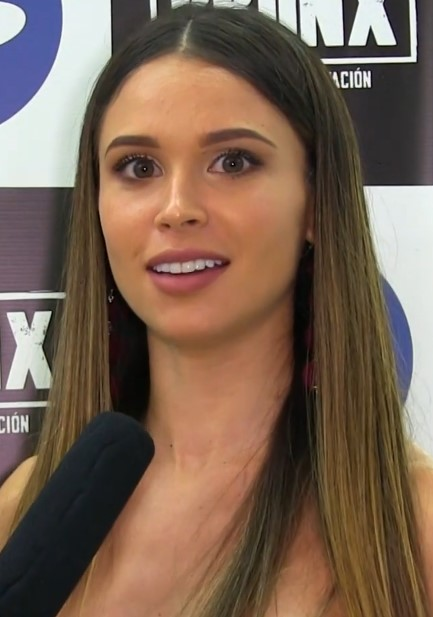
- Born: Rosmeri Karina Marval Diaz; December 18, 1991 (age 34); Los Teques, Miranda, Venezuela
- Occupation: Actress
- Years active: 2007–present
- Notable work: Somos tú y yo
- Spouse: Aran de las Casas (m. 2016)
- Children: 2

Rosmeri Marval (born December 18, 1991) is a Venezuelan actress and model. She rose to prominence with her antagonistic role in the Venevision and Boomerang series Somos tú y yo in 2007. She has had numerous modeling and acting spots since, including her recent starring role in Entre tu amor y mi amor.

== Personal life ==
Marval is the daughter of Elena Díaz and Rodolfo Marval. She has been in a relationship with actor, drummer and singer Arán de las Casas whom she shared credit with on Venevisión's series, Somos tú y yo, since 2008. She married De las Casas on October 1, 2016.

== Filmography ==
Television performance
Year	Title	Roles	Notes
2007–2009	Somos tú y yo	Rosmery "La Sifrina"	Main role (seasons 1–3); 161 episodes
2011	NPS: No puede ser	Rosmery "La Sifrina"	Main role; 51 episodes
2012	Válgame Dios	Kimberly Castillo Rodriguez	
2015–2016	Amor secreto	María Lucía Gutierrez Vielma	Main role; 145 episodes
2016	Entre tu amor y mi amor	Sol Buendía	Main role; 111 episodes
2019	El Bronx	Juliana Luna Gómez	Main role; 82 episodes
2019	Bolívar	María Antonia Bolívar	Main role; 60 episodes
2020	La Nocturna	Valery Rosero	Main role (season 2)
2023	Dramáticas	Abigail	
