= ADSO =

Application Development System Online (ADSO) is a tool used to expedite the writing and testing of modular applications using IDMS databases. Activities such as flow-of-control processing, data storage definition, data verification, editing, error handling, terminal input and output, menu creation and menu display are specified by using a series of screens instead of conventional detailed code.

ADSO or ADS/O or just ADS is originally Cullinet product, later company was acquired by Computer Associates.

== Components ==
ADS/O has three components ADSG, ADSA, ADSR.

- ADSA (ADS Application): Used to develop and compile processes/applications
- ADSG (ADS Map generator): Used to generate the screens/Maps for online application and compile the maps.
- ADSR (ADS Run time): Is used to run the Maps and Application generated by ADSA and ADSG in live ADSR environment.

== Tools ==
Other tools used along with ADS/O to develop ADS/O application are:

- DME (Dictionary Module Editor) – This is an editor which is used to write the application programs. The programs created through IDD are stored in the IDD.
- MAPC (Create Maps) – This utility is used to design user interfaces i.e. screens.
- IDDM (Integrated Data Dictionary) – This is a menu driven utility which facilitates adding, modifying and querying objects in the Integrated Data Dictionary.

ADSO can be used to develop online or batch applications.

== Benefits ==
- Prototype without writing much code
- Review screen displays before coding process logic
- Input records can be automatically edited and verified using the editing and error-handling facilities
- Has a built-in debugging process
- Monitors runtime performance and resource usage
- Process logic can be added at any time
- Testing abilities to view the data and change it if needed
- Allows for step-by-step trace through application
