= Neutro Shorty concert stampede =

2019 crowd crush in Caracas, Venezuela

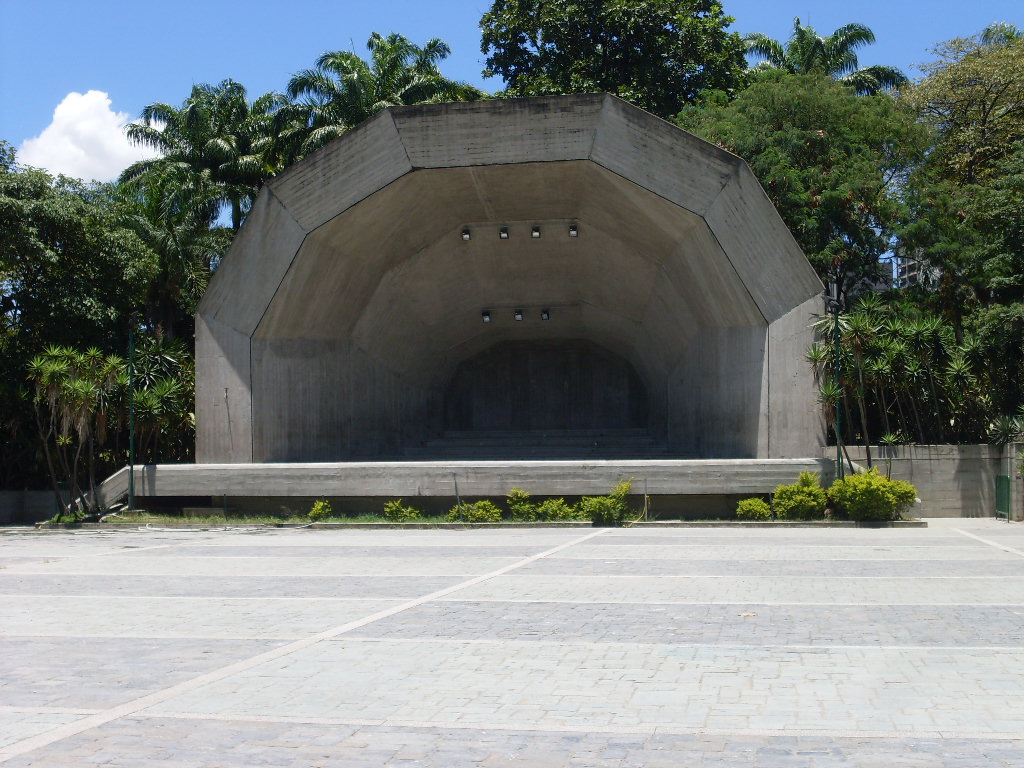
- 'Concha acústica' concert space in the park
- Date: November 9, 2019
- Venue: Parque Generalísimo Francisco de Miranda
- Location: Caracas, Venezuela
- Type: Human stampede
- Deaths: 4
- Injuries: 50+

On 9 November 2019, four teenagers were killed and over 50 people were injured in a crowd crush at a Latin trap music concert in Caracas, Venezuela.

== Crush ==
The crush began before a free concert by Venezuelan music act Neutro Shorty in the Parque del Este (officially Gen. Francisco de Miranda Park) in Caracas, the capital of Venezuela. The concert was called Banderas Blancas.

Over 8,000 people, largely teenagers, showed up to attend the concert; fighting and pushing broke out after a group of young people climbed over a park fence to get into the concert. It is reported that though the concert was to begin at 10 am, many of the people were breaking into the park early and causing chaos. Spanish newspaper El País reports that the concert was "marked by negligence and improvisation" and that there were limited police officers from the National Guard in attendance outside the park, being supplemented by park rangers. The number of concertgoers overwhelmed the security team, who could not control the flow of people.

The main crush of people took place between the Simón Bolívar bridge and La Carlota, at around 8:50 am. People climbing the fences eventually toppled them, which then caused mass rush into the park, according to the local crime commissioner.

== Victims ==
The first deceased victim was found dead at the scene and transferred to the Domingo Luciani Hospital, while another two were transferred through the Pérez de León Hospital; one was operated on here before dying, with the two being transferred to the Domingo Luciani and then the Bello Monte morgue. Another person was killed; all of them were aged 14.

Most of the victims were treated at the Pérez de León Hospital, with others treated at the Centro Diagnóstico Integral de Los Dos Caminos and the Domingo Luciani Hospital. These hospitals have trauma centers, as many of the injured had suffered asphyxiation and polytrauma in the stampede.

== Aftermath ==
The concert, which was planned to happen at the Concha acústica stage in the park, was moved. Neutro Shorty posted on social media that it would still take place at the planned time, but in nearby Parque Simón Bolívar – concertgoers crossed into this park and rioted in the performance area. Neutro Shorty performed three songs, but the concert was stopped at this point and the parks cleared as emergency services continued to treat injured people in the area.

The National Parks Institute of Venezuela, the body that ultimately administers the parks, later used social media to announce that though the body is sad at the events, the concert was taking place without their permission. The concert organizers have not commented, and no group has taken responsibility.

Neutro Shorty also gave a message in response, before he went on stage, saying "I came to sing to them for free, I didn't come to screw them over, or anything political, or anything. [...] What is happening is sad, children are passing out, I feel bad when I see their faces. I don't want this to keep happening."

A Venezuelan NGO founder spoke out about how the tragedy at the park is a microcosm of the country, and that society needs to assess itself when children are using violence as their first option to get what they want.

=== Investigation ===
Tarek William Saab announced that a full investigation would happen, and would be conducted by the division for child protection. The investigation, involving the forensics branch, began on Sunday 10 November. By 12 November, three people had been arrested in relation to the stampede, including two concert organizers. There were rumors that one of those arrested was Neutro Shorty; Saab confirmed that this was untrue on 13 November.

== See also ==
- List of human stampedes
- El Paraíso stampede
