= Arán de las Casas =

Venezuelan actor and singer

- Born: Arán de las Casas; March 17, 1989 (age 36); Caracas, Venezuela
- Occupation(s): Singer, Actor
- Spouse: Rosmeri Marval (2016 - present)

Arán de las Casas (born 17 March 1989), professionally known as Arán One or simply Arán is a Venezuelan actor and singer.

== Biography ==
Arán was born in 1989. His parents' names are César de las Casas and Nicole Medina. From a very young age, Arán developed a passion for music and extreme sports. He learned to play the drums at the age of 7. When he joined school, he formed a band called AFM with a group of friends and they participated in various music band competitions.

He began his acting career in 2006 by participating in the television show Full Gente Nueva produced by Venevisión. In 2007, he was part of the main cast of the youth series Somos tú y yo. Due to the success of the show, he joined the cast for a second season in 2008 and a consecutive third season titled Un nuevo Día in 2009. For his role in the series, Arán won an award during the El Mara Internacional as the Best Young Actor category in 2009.

He released his first music single titled Ven Ven that combines various Latin rhythms with electronic and percussion instruments.

In 2012, he participated in the telenovela Válgame Dios alongside girlfriend Rosmeri Marval.

His mother, Nicole Medina, died on August 1, 2014, after having been placed in intensive care at a hospital in Caracas.

De las Casas married Rosmeri Marval on October 1, 2016, in the island of Margarita, Venezuela.

== Filmography ==
Television and Film
Year	Title	Role
2007-08	Somos tú y yo	Arán "El Galán"
2009	Somos tú y yo: un nuevo día	Arán
2012	Válgame Dios	Héctor Zubizarrieta
2014	La virgen de la calle	Willy
