= Sheryl Rubio =

Venezuelan actress & singer (born 1992)

- Born: Sheryl Dayana Rubio Rojas; 28 December 1992 (age 33); Caracas, Venezuela
- Occupations: Actress; singer; dancer; model; fashion designer
- Years active: 2000–present
- Spouse: Lucas Shapiro (m. 2020)
- Partner: Lasso (2011-2018)
- Children: 1
- Parents: Damaris Rojas (mother); Oscar Rubio (father)
- Musical career
- Genres: Pop; teen pop
- Instruments: Vocals; piano; guitar
- Label: Universal Music

Sheryl Dayana Rubio Rojas (born 28 December 1992) is a Venezuelan actress, singer, model, dancer, songwriter and fashion designer known for her role as Sheryl on the Boomerang Latin America series Somos tú y yo. Since 2018, Rubio has starred as Lucía Davila on the Netflix series The House of Flowers.

== Early life ==
Sheryl Rubio was born in Caracas, Venezuela. Her parents are Oscar Rubio and Damaris Rojas, she had an older sister, Damaris Belmonte, who was murdered in 1997 by her boyfriend, the actress was 5 years old when this happened and she confessed that it was a hard blow for her and her mother, this experience has led to star in different UN Women campaigns against gender violence and women's rights. Rubio studied in the Colegio San Jose de Tarbes in Caracas, has stated that when attending school, she was not very popular and was even bullied. At seven years of age, she began to feel interested in becoming an actress and began her career in small roles on television.

== Career ==
In 1999, Rubio started pursuing an acting career. She began working and appearing in a number of commercials before transitioning to television. Rubio made her acting debut in the telenovela, Amantes de Luna Llena in 2000 when she was 8 years old, where she played Angela Rigores.

In 2001, she portrayed Micaela Benavides in the telenovela La Soberana. In 2002, Rubio landed her first leading role on television, as Renata Antoni Diaz in La niña de mis ojos.

In 2005, at age 11 she began working on the TV show Atómico. In 2006, castings began for Somos tú y yo. The main concern of the casting directors was to find the right protagonist of the series, the actress showed up at the casting and the producers were impressed by the confidence the young woman had in herself, the actress was chosen as the protagonist of the series, where character of Sheryl Sanchez. The series was a co-production between the Boomerang and Venevisión, the series was broadcast in Latin America, Europe, Middle East and Asia. The series was premiered for the first time on 27 June 2007 in Venezuela by Venevisión. The series premiered on 15 January 2008 by Boomerang in Latin America and Europe. The series ended on 15 December 2008 and its final episode had an audience of approximately 9.8 million. In 2008, the cast toured Venezuela, performing songs from the series, and when the show ended in 2009, a compilation album of ten songs from the series, titled Somos tú y yo: un nuevo día was released.

In January 2009, Rubio starred in the third season titled Somos tú y yo: Un nuevo día, where he played the characters of Sheryl Sanchez and Candy. The series was based on the American movie Grease. The series was premiered on 17 August 2009 by the Boomerang.

In January 2010, reprised her role as Sheryl Sanchez in the series, NPS: No puede ser. The series is the second spin-off of Somos tú y yo and marks the closing of the series. The series premiered for the first time on 25 July 2010 in Venezuela for Venevisión and on 8 November 2010 for the Boomerang. That same year, she portrayed Sofia Carlota in her debut telenovela La viuda joven, written by Martin Hahn. The telenovela was based on the Spanish Carmen Cervera. The telenovela was premiered on 16 March 2011 by Venevisión.

In 2011, she played Stefany Miller in the telenovela Mi ex me tiene ganas, written by Martin Hahn and produced by Sandra Rioboó. The telenovela was premiered on 16 May 2012 by Venevisión and ended on 5 December 2012. Rubio received a positive reception on the character of the media in Latin America. This character marks her acting growth in a more mature character. That same year, Rubio was named as a judge on the beauty contest Miss Teen Aruba International 2012.

In 2012, she provided vocals on the song "Quiero que vuelvas" with Lasso. In 2013, Rubio performed a pair of live shows in Caracas and Maracaibo, delivering a monologue written by Amaris Páez titled "Sheryl's Confession."

In January 2014, she participate in the telenovela Corazón Esmeralda. Rubio's character is a singer-songwriter, and she performs a number of songs in the series. The telenovela premiered on 3 March 2014 by Venevisión. That same year, Rubio collaborated with the clothing company Melao on a line of clothes to be sold throughout Venezuela.

In August 2014, Rubio previewed Sheryl Rubio in collaboration with Melao, which they unveiled in October, 2014 at the Centro Sambil in Caracas, Venezuela.

In 2015, she played Ángela Mendori in an episode of the series Escándalos, based on the Ariel Castro kidnappings, that occurred in the United States between 2002 and 2004. In August 2015, played the role of Malibu in the television series Los Hijos de Don Juan.

In August 2016, she starred in the Upload Project campaign with StandWithUs, and Israeli non-profit organization, together with Candelaria Molfese, for which the actress as in the cities of Tel Aviv and Jerusalem for a few days, the project aims to promote tourism in Israel, for which the actress traveled and had several days in Tel Aviv and Jerusalem.

In November 2016, Netflix and Telemundo announced that Rubio would be starring in their new series Guerra de ídolos, scheduled to begin in 2017.

In 2018 she starred in the Netflix original series, La Casa de las Flores.

== Other work ==
=== Modeling ===
Rubio began her career as a model in 2001, before becoming an actress, as the protagonist of Hang Ten, Toddy, Frescolita and the famous Coca-Cola drink. In 2005, she was an image of Always.

From 2013 to 2016, she was the main image of the Pavitas shoe brand. In 2013, Rubio supported the foundation Apoyo y Protección Eco Animal KikiriWau's animal adoption campaign, "Supporting Good Causes", lending her image to its promotional material. In 2013, Rubio carried out the Yakera campaign for the Melao clothing brand in Delta Amacuro, Venezuela, sharing shots with the indigenous community. She also made her debut as a fashion designer and launched her own clothing line.

In 2015, she posed for a photo shoot with the magazine Nos 3.

In 2016, she was the main model of Flamingo Glasses, in its summer edition. She was also a model of Forever 21, in two collections, Back to School and Holiday. In April 2016, she was the protagonist of Coca-Cola's Taste the Feeling campaign.

In 2017, she was image of Nike Air Vapormax of Nike Women's Advertising. Also, she was the protagonist of the Guess clothing brand campaign, Love Guess, alog with singer and actor Joe Jonas. In 2018, she's a model for the Givenchy brand.

In June 2018, she was the image of the new clothing line of the Spanish brand for women Stradivarius, and she traveled to the Amalfi Coast, Italy, to be part of the event that made the brand in Italy.

== Personal life ==
Rubio has been living in New York City, United States, since 2020. She is fluent in English and Spanish.

In 2011, she began dating Venezuelan singer Lasso, with whom she maintained a relationship until October 2018.

On September 8, 2020, she became engaged to American orthodontic specialist Lucas Wade Shapiro, with whom she had begun a relationship in January 2019. On October 24 of that same year they were married civilly in New York City, with a subsequent celebration, on April 2, 2022 in Mexico.

On August 26, 2024, she announced her pregnancy. On September 1, she revealed that she was going to have a girl and on November 16, Remi was born.

== Filmography ==
=== Television ===
Year	Title	Role	Notes
2000-01	Amantes de Luna Llena	Angela Rigores	Television debut
2001	La soberana	Ana Ozores	Lead role
2001-02	La niña de mis ojos	Renata Antoni Diaz	Recurring role
2005	Atómico	Herself	Host (Season 2)
2007-08	Somos tú y yo	Sheryl Sanchez	Main role (161 episodes)
2009	Somos tú y yo: un nuevo día	Sheryl Sanchez / Candy	Lead role
2011	NPS: No puede ser	Sheryl Sanchez	Main role (50 episodes)
2010-11	La viuda joven	Sofia Carlota Calderon Humboldt	Co-lead role
2012	Mi ex me tiene ganas	Stefany Miller Holt	Co-lead role (all 159 episodes)
2013-14	Corazón esmeralda	Rocio del Alba Salvatierra Lopez	Co-lead role
2015	Escándalos	Angela Mendori	Episode: "Adiós a las niñas"
2015	Los Hijos de Don Juan	Malibu	Co-lead role
2017	Guerra de ídolos	Julia Matamoros	Co-lead role
2018-19	The House of Flowers	Lucia Davila	Co-lead role
2020-21	100 días para enamorarnos	Mariana Velarde	Co-lead role

=== Film ===
Year	Title	Role	Notes
2021	No, porque me enamoro	Joanna	TBA

== Stage ==
- El Confesionario de Sheryl (2013)

== Tours ==
With Somos Tú y Yo

- Somos Tú y Yo Tour (2007-2008)
- Somos Tú y Yo, Un Nuevo Día: Live Tour (2009)
