= Víctor Drija =

Venezuelan singer & actor (born 1985)

- Born: Víctor Antonio Drija Vivas; 16 January 1985 (age 41); Caracas, Venezuela
- Occupations: Singer; dancer; actor
- Years active: 2007–present
- Television: Somos tú y yo
- Musical career
- Genres: Pop
- Instruments: Vocals; guitar; piano; drums
- Labels: Universal Music, Independent
- Website: www.victordrija.com.ve

Víctor Antonio Drija Vivas (born 16 January 1985) is a Venezuelan actor, singer and dancer, best known for portraying Victor on the Boomerang Latin America series Somos tú y yo.

== Early life ==
Drija was born in Caracas, Venezuela to acclaimed dancers and choreographers Anita Vivas and Antonio Drija. He is also the brother of Broadway dancer and actor, George Akram. Drija took on dance classes with Kehynde Hill, Dave Scott, Brian Green, Tabitha D'Umo, Marty Kudelka, The Jabbawockeez and Shane Sparks, among other renowned Hip Hop dancers.

== Career ==
=== 2000–2007: Beginnings with Ruta de las mañanas ===
His first appearance on television was on the children's shows of RCTV, Video Time and Ruta de las Mañanas and on Venevisión Rugemanía's television program. His skills as a dancer captured the attention of many, as he learned with ease, garnering a number of opportunities to showcase in events like los Premios Ronda, Chica 2001, Unidos Contra el Cáncer and Premios Anda. In 2000, he traveled to the United States, performing in events such as Nuestra Navidad and the Macy's Thanksgiving Day Parade in 2002. Drija also performed in stage shows such as Celebremos La Vida and Érase Una Vez Un Baúl Encantado. He additionally performed at the Premios Fox Sports, Premios Lo Nuestro, Premios Juventud, and Selena ¡VIVE!, accompanying artists such as: Gloria Estefan, Alejandro Sanz, Sin Bandera, Olga Tañon, Ivy Queen, Paulina Rubio, Aleks Syntek, Aventura, Frankie J and Juan Luis Guerra.

=== 2007–2011: Success with Somos tú y yo ===
En 2007, Drija landed his first leading role on television, as Víctor Gómez in Somos tú y yo. The series was a co-production between the Boomerang and Venevisión, the series was broadcast in Latin America, Europe, Middle East and Asia. The series was premiered for the first time on June 27, 2007, in Venezuela by Venevisión. The series premiered on January 15, 2008, by Boomerang in Latin America and Europe. The series ended on December 15, 2008, and its final episode had and audience of approximately 9.8 million. In 2008, the cast toured Venezuela, performing songs from the series, and when the show ended in 2009, a compilation album of ten songs from the series, titled Somos tú y yo: un nuevo día was released. Víctor later became a contributing choreographer for the second and third seasons of "Somos Tú y Yo." Drija has additionally been credited with being responsible for the visual concepts and choreographies of performers like Chino y Nacho, Franco & Oscarcito, Lsquadron, as well as many large-scale events such as Miss Venezuela.

In January 2009, Drija starred in the television series Somos tú y yo: un nuevo día, where he played the characters of Sheryl Sanchez and Candy. The series is a spin-off of Somos tú y yo and was based on the American movie Grease. The series was premiered on August 17, 2009, by the Boomerang.

In January 2010, reprised her role as Victor in the series, NPS: No puede ser. The series is the second spin-off of Somos tú y yo and marks the closing of the series.

In 2011, he played Gerardo Moncada in the telenovela in the telenovela Natalia del mar. Drija's character is a singer-songwriter, and she performs a number of songs in the series.

=== 2010–present: Solo career and upcoming debut studio album ===
In 2010, Drija announced he would release his first album as a solo artist, titled "Pasado, presente, futuro". When asked about the album's genre, she described it as mainly dance with hip hop influences. The album's lead single, "1, 2, 3", was released for digital download on her website on 20 August. In November 2010, he released the videoclip of his second single, "Este amor". In March 2011, he was the opening act for the Colombian singer Shakira, at the Poliedro de Caracas in Venezuela. In November 2011, he received an award for his work at the Festival Internacional de la Orquídea in Maracaibo.

In 2012, he released the first single «Amanecer», from his second album Romance Dance, and also presented the English version of the single, «Sunrise Sunset». For his record work, he received three nominations at the Premios Pepsi Music Venezuela, as Pop Artist of the Year, Best Pop Video and Refreshing Artist. In November 2013, he presented his second single, "De ti no me voy a olvidar".

In May 2014, Drija toured the United States, Colombia, Mexico, Ecuador and Chile, as part of their Media Tour. The singer appeared on television programs, such as Showbizz of CNN en Español, Tu Desayuno Alegre, Charityn and Felipe El Show, among others. In April 2014, he performed at the Billboard Latin Music Awards in Miami. In November 2014, he released the single "Única", whose video clip was presented on November 13, 2014.

In 2015, he participated in the single, "Te quiero así" by the band Siete Bonchones, and also participated in the single, "Cantemos", of Cáceres, along with the Chinese and Nacho, Rawayana, Los Cadillac's, Jonathan Moly, Guaco and Jorge Polanco. In March 2015, Drija released the single, "Mia," along with singer Samy Hawk. In May 2015, he won the award for Best Andean Region Artist at the Heat Latin Music Awards. In January 2016, he released the last single, "Tu caballero". In August 2016, he presented "Beber", the first single from his third album.

In March 2018, Drija launched its new promotional single, "Un poquito más".

== Personal life ==
Drija has been in a long-term relationship with Miss Venezuela International 2011, Blanca Aljibes, whom he met at the pageant in 2012. His engagement with Aljibes was announced in February 2017 through the release of the music video for his single "I Love You," which highlights the moment in which he proposed to her in front of friends and family. They got finally married the first day in September. On July 2, 2020, they gave birth to their first child Liam Michael Drija Aljibes.

== Filmography ==
Television roles
Year	Title	Role	Notes
2007–2008	Somos tú y yo	Víctor	Main Role
2009	Somos tú y yo: un nuevo día	Víctor Rodríguez	Main Role
2011–2012	Natalia del Mar	Gerardo Moncada	Main role
