= Somos tú y yo =

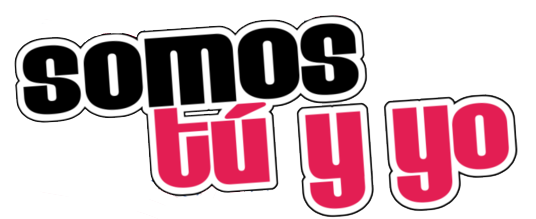
- Genre: Telenovela; Musical; Romantic comedy
- Created by: Vladimir Pérez
- Based on: Grease by Jim Jacobs; Warren Casey
- Written by: Solange Keoleyan; Sebastián Parrotta
- Directed by: Eduardo Pérez; Norma Jiménez Montealegre
- Creative director: Rock Díaz
- Starring: Sheryl Rubio; Víctor Drija; Arán de las Casas; Rosmeri Marval; Gabriel Coronel
- Theme music composer: Vladimir Pérez
- Opening theme: "Somos tú y yo" by Sheryl Rubio and Víctor Drija
- Country of origin: Venezuela
- Original language: Spanish
- No. of seasons: 3
- No. of episodes: 240

Production
- Executive producer: María Beatriz Padrón
- Producers: Rock Díaz; Fernando Blanco
- Production locations: Caracas, Venezuela; Margarita Island, Nueva Esparta, Venezuela
- Running time: 45 minutes
- Production company: Tigritos Media Productions

Original release
- Network: Venevisión (Venezuela); Boomerang (Latin America)
- Release: June 27, 2007 – November 17, 2009

Somos tú y yo, known as Somos tú y yo: Un nuevo día for its final season, is a Venezuelan telenovela created by Vladimir Pérez, filmed in Caracas, Venezuela and produced by the Venezuelan television channel Venevisión, which later sold the series to several broadcast channels all over Latin America, including Boomerang. The series stars Sheryl Rubio and Víctor Drija as two teenagers (also named Sheryl and Víctor) who fall in love with each other and face several struggles.

== Synopsis ==
Somos tú y yo revolves around the students of The Academy, a school of performing arts, ambitions, talents and relationships. The heart of the story is the first love, and viewers follow the budding romance of young singers Victor Rodríguez (Victor Drija) and Sheryl Sánchez (Sheryl Rubio), whose friendship turns into true love in the midst of many setbacks.

The third season, subtitled Un nuevo día, directly adapts the events of Grease (1978), in which following his parents' deaths and with dreams of becoming an international rock star, Victor decides to move to the United States, promises his girlfriend Sheryl that he would always keep in touch with her; however, after not hearing from Victor for months, Sheryl decides to forget about him. Three years later, Victor returns to the country, but discovers that everything has changed when he sees that his old gang, "Los Tigres", has replaced him with Aran (Arán de las Casas) as leader, and that Sheryl has become the leader of a group of girls called "Las Reinas" and a "tough girl" who does not want to know anything about him.

Meanwhile, Victor reconnects with his best friend from his youth, who waited for him the whole time he was out of the country, tomboy Rosmeri Rivas (Rosmeri Marval), a mechanic for the Rodríguez family workshop who is secretly in love with him. With their new leader, Los Tigres goes from consisting of Jorge, Victor, Luciano and Ricardo to being Aran, Gustavo, Luciano, Jorge and Ricardo, all popular kids in the city. In addition, a new group named "The Artists", consisting of the rich children of The Academy, Andrés, Alejandro, Gabriel, Erick, Oriana, Yuvana and Claudia, are led by Hendrick Welles (Hendrick Bages), the star of the reality series The Hendrick Show. With this distraction, Arán attempts to seduce Sheryl, while Oriana Castillo (Oriana Ramírez), a rival television star to Hendrick, also falls in love with Víctor in addition to Rosemari and try to prevent him from winning her back.

== Cast ==
- Sheryl Rubio as Sheryl Sánchez
- Víctor Drija as Victor Rodríguez
- Rosmeri Marval as Rosmeri Rivas
- Arán de las Casas as Aran Gutiérrez
- Oriana Ramírez as Oriana Castillo
- Hendrick Bages as Hendrick Welles
- Jorge Torres as Jorge Gómez
- Kelly Durán as Kelly Mendoza
- Gustavo Elis as Gustavo León
- Paola Galué as Paola León
- Yuvanna Montalvo as Yuvanna
- Alejandro Mogollón as Alejandro
- Ana Karina Cuccurullo as Ana Karina
- Rosangélica Piscitelli as Rosy
- Gabriel Coronel as Gabo
- Claudia Morales as Claudia Sánchez
- Luciano Muguerza as Luciano
- Mandi Meza as Mandy
- Gabriel Uzcategui as Andrés
- María Gabriela Hernández as Gaby
- Rodrigo Pedreira as Rey
- María Fernanda Pita as Mafer
- Vanessa Suárez as Nessa
- Yelitza Méndez as Yelitza
- Arianny Moreno as Arianny
- Nicolas Pérez as Nicolas
- Bárbara Díaz as Barbara
- Christian Zamora as Christian
- Alfredo Lovera as Alfredo
- Juan Carlos Denis as Juan Carlos
- Florbelys Núñez as Florbelys
- Angelica Ruiz as Angelica
- Abraham Arrieta as Abraham
- Adriana Prieto as Adriana
- Nathaly Acedo as Nathaly

== Episodes ==
Season	Episodes	Originally aired	
Season	Episodes	Season premiere	Season finale
1	67	June 27, 2007	November 13, 2007
2	79	July 2, 2008	December 5, 2008
3	50	June 27, 2009	November 17, 2009

== Production ==
Somos tú y yo was produced by Venevisión, who also owns the broadcast rights to all three seasons of the show. Each season was filmed in Caracas, both in interior and exterior places. Season two featured episodes filmed at the beaches of Coche Island, in Nueva Esparta State.

The series aired in Latin America, Europe, Middle East and Asia. It premiered in Venezuela on June 27, 2007 and its pilot episode had approximately 5.9 million viewers. The second season ended on November 13, 2008 and its final episode had an audience of about 9.8 million, the largest audience received by any final episode of a series of Boomerang Latin America.

The cast of Somos tú y yo: Un nuevo día (from left to right): Rosmeri Marval as Rosmeri Rivas, Víctor Drija as Victor Rodríguez, Sheryl Rubio as Sheryl Sánchez and Arán de las Casas as Aran Gutiérrez.

The series was also acquired by several air and cable channels around the world, including Italy and the Philippines. Some of the leading channels were Boomerang Latin American, GMA Network, Univision, and RAI.

After reaching record-breaking ratings in Latin America, Venevision International, the entertainment company owned by the Cisneros Group, along with DVI Productions, announced localized adaptations for China, Indonesia and Malaysia.

=== Casting ===
Sheryl Rubio was selected by casting. The audition process lasted six months and tested the singing, dancing and acting abilities of each aspirant. Rubio, who had made special appearances as a child actress in television prior to Somos tú y yo, confessed that she had never taken acting classes up to that point. Víctor Drija was invited to audition by the series creator, Vladimir Pérez; eventually, he obtained the main role. Meanwhile, actress Rosmeri Marval, who plays Rosmery Rivas, was attending school in Caracas when the principal informed the students that there would be an audition; she decided to participate.

Venevisión made an open casting to choose new characters for the second season. It began as a virtual casting that allowed people between the age 13 and 20 to participate.

== Spin-off ==
In August 2009, Venevisión announced that Vladimir Perez would be making a spin-off following the unprecedented worldwide success of the original series, crossing over into the sitcom genre, but still including musical numbers. The show, titled NPS: No puede ser ("ICB: It Can't Be!"), stars Sheryl and Rosmery (again played by Sheryl Rubio and Rosmery Marval) and premiered on July 22, 2011.
