= List of international game shows =

Even though game shows first evolved in the United States, they have been presented in many countries.

== Argentina ==
- 100 Argentinos Dicen (Argentine version of Bøhh det er mig Feud)
- Buena Fortuna
- Clink Caja
- El Precio Justo (Argentine version of The Price Is Right)
- ¿Quien quiere ser millonario? (2001–2002, 2019–present)
- Sume y Lleve
- Ta Te Show (Argentine version of Hollywood Squares) (1992–1996)
- Trato Hecho (Argentine version of Deal or No Deal)
- Boom! (Telefe 2017–present)
- The Wall Construye tu vida (Telefe 2017–present)
- Pasapalabra

== Australia ==
As with most countries, Australia has made many adaptations of U.S. based game shows, most of which copy the U.S. version's set, particularly with the Grundy shows.

== Belgium ==
- De 12de man
- De XII werken van Vanoudenhoven
- 100.000 of niets
- À vos marques
- Alles Moet Weg (Belgian version of Ant & Dec's Saturday Night Takeaway)
- De allesweter
- L'amour est dans le pré (Belgian version of Farmer Wants a Wife)
- Atoukado
- Beste vrienden
- Bingovision
- Binnen De Minuut (Dutch-Belgian version of Minute to Win It)
- Blind Date (Belgian version of The Dating Game)
- Blinde Vinken
- Blokken (Tetris-based game show)
- De Box
- De Canvascrack
- La Chaîne
- Coup de dés
- Debby & Nancy
- Debby & Nancy's Warme Wintershow
- Donderen in Keulen
- De Drie Wijzen
- Duel
- Eén tegen allen
- L'Énigme du cristal
- Êtes-vous plus malin qu'un enfant de primaire ? (Belgian version of Are You Smarter than a 5th Grader?)
- Familieraad (Belgian version of Family Feud)
- Fata Morgana
- Felice!
- Forts en tête
- De Foute Quiz
- De generatieshow
- De Grote Sprong (Belgian version of Celebrity Splash!)
- De Grote Volksquiz
- Go Go Stop
- Herexamen
- Hoger, Lager (Belgian version of Card Sharks)
- Hole in the wall
- Homo universalis (Original version of 99 to Beat)
- I Can See Your Voice
- De IQ Quiz
- Je le savais !
- De Juiste Prijs (Dutch-Belgian version of The Price Is Right)
- Le Juste Prix (French-Belgian version of The Price Is Right)
- Kalmte Kan U Redden
- Kan Iedereen Nog Volgen? (Show about the future)
- Kassa Kassa
- De Kazakkendraaiers
- De kinderpuzzel
- De klas van Frieda
- De Kop van Jut
- Koppensnellers
- De Krokusquiz
- Een Laatste Groet
- LEGO Masters
- Lost in Tokyo
- Mag ik u kussen?
- Micro Macro
- Mijn Keuken Mijn Restaurant (Belgian version of My Kithcen Rules)
- Mijn Pop-uprestaurant
- Mijn Restaurant
- De Mol (Original version of The Mole)
- nl:De Muziekkampioen
- Namen Noemen
- Niets Dan De Waarheid
- Normale mensen
- De Notenclub
- The One Man Show
- Pak de poen, de show van 1 miljoen
- De Pappenheimers
- Peking Express
- Het Perfecte Koppel
- Peter vs De Rest
- Prenez l'air
- De Provincieshow
- Puzzeltijd
- Qui sera millionnaire? (French-Belgian version of Who Wants to Be a Millionaire?)
- Quix
- Ranking the Stars
- Rap Klap (Dutch-Belgian version of Hot Streak / Ruck Zuck)
- Rasters
- Reclame AUB
- Rodenbachstraat 29
- Schalkse Ruiters
- Scheire en de schepping
- Septante et un
- Shrimp TV
- De Slimste Mens ter Wereld
- Sorry voor alles
- Still Standing : Qui passera à la trappe ?
- Switch
- 't Is maar een woord
- Te bed of niet te bed
- Te nemen of te laten (Belgian version of Deal or No Deal)
- Les Traîtres
- Twee tot de zesde macht
- De val van 1 miljoen (Belgian version of The Million Pound Drop)
- Viersprong
- Visa pour le monde
- Voulez-vous jouer ?
- Vriend of Vijand
- Vroeger of later?
- Walters Verjaardagsshow
- We're Going to Ibiza
- Weet Ik Veel
- Wie ben ik?
- Wie trouwt mijn zoon?
- Wie wordt de man van Phaedra?
- Wie wordt euromiljonair? (Dutch-Belgian version of Who Wants to Be a Millionaire?)
- Wies Andersen Show
- Zeg eens euh!
- De Zwakste Schakel (Dutch-Belgian version of Weakest Link)

== Brazil ==
- Big Brother Brasil (Brazil's version of Big Brother) on Globo
- Clube dos Quinze (Brazil's version of Jackpot) on TV Globo and Tupi
- Corrida de Formula B (Brazil's "original" version of Card Sharks) on Tupi
- Ela Disse, Ele Disse (Brazil's version of Tattletales) on SBT
- Familionária (Brazil's second version of Family Feud)
- Family Feud (Brazil's third version of Family Feud) on SBT
- Identidade Secreta (Brazil's version of Identity) on SBT
- Jogo das Familias (Brazil's "original" version of Family Feud) on Tupi and SBT
- Jogo da Velha (Brazil's version of Hollywood Squares) on Globo
- Jogo do Mais ou Menos (Brazil's "revival" of Card Sharks) on SBT
- Mega Senha (Brazil's version of Million Dollar Password)
- Namoro na TV (Brazil's version of The Dating Game) on Tupi and SBT
- O Preço Certo (Brazil's version of The Price Is Right)
- Olimpiadas do Faustao (Brazil's version of Takeshi's Castle on Globo)
- Passa ou Repassa (Brazil's version of Double Dare) on SBT
- Roleta Russa (Brazil's version of Russian Roulette) on Rede Record
- Roletrando (now Roda a Roda) (Brazil's version of Wheel of Fortune) on SBT
- Show do Milhão (Brazil's similar version of Who Wants to Be a Millionaire?) on SBT
- SuperMarket (Brazil's version of Supermarket Sweep) on Band
- Topa ou Não Topa (Brazil's version of Deal or No Deal) on SBT
- Voce é mais esperto do que um aluno da quinta série? (Brazil's version of Are You Smarter Than a 5th Grader?) on SBT

=== Currently airing (2021/2022) ===
Title	TV channel	Genre
Big Brother Brasil	Globo	reality/game show
The Voice Brasil	Globo	reality/game show
The Voice Kids	Globo	reality/game show
The Voice +	Globo	reality/game show
Dança dos Famosos (Dancing with the Stars)	Globo	reality/game show
Show dos Famosos (Your Face Sounds Familiar)	Globo	reality/game show
No Limite (Survivor)	Globo	reality/game show
Quem Quer Ser um Milionário? (Who Wants to Be a Millionaire?)	Globo	game show
Canta Comigo (All Together Now)	Record	reality/game show
Canta Comigo Teen (All Together Now)	Record	reality/game show
The Wall Brasil (The Wall)	Globo	game show
Tem Ou Não Tem (Family Feud)	Globo	game show
Roda a Roda Jequiti (Wheel of Fortune)	SBT	game show
A Fazenda (The Farm)	Record	reality/game show
Bake Off Brasil	SBT	reality/game show
Bake Off Celebridades	SBT	reality/game show
MasterChef Brasil	Band	reality/game show
O Melhor (The Winner Is)	SBT	reality/game show
Mega Senha (Million Dollar Password)	RedeTV!	game show
Paredão dos Famosos (Hollywood Squares)	Record	game show
O Céu é o Limite (L'eredità)	RedeTV!	game show
Acredite Em Quem Quiser (To Tell the Truth)	Globo	game show
Pequenos Gênios (Genius Junior)	Globo	game show
O Mais Fraco Vai Embora (Weakest Link)	SBT	game show
Nada além de Um Minuto (Minute to Win It)	SBT	game show
Programa Silvio Santos - Gincana (Takeshi's Castle)	SBT	game show
Isso Eu Faço (I Can Do That)	Record	game show
Passa ou Repassa (Double Dare)	SBT	game show
1001 Perguntas	Band	game show
Zig Zag Arena	Globo	game show
Jogo do Mais ou Menos (Card Sharks)	SBT	game show
Show do Milhão PicPay	SBT	game show
Quem Arrisca Ganha Mais	SBT	game show
Comprar É Bom, Levar É Melhor	SBT	game show
Power Couple (זוג מנצח VIP)	Record	reality/game show
Top Chef Brasil (Top Chef)	Record	reality/game show
Cozinhe se Puder - Mestres da Sabotagem (Cutthroat Kitchen)	SBT	reality/game show
Wall Duet Brasil (The Wall Song)	SBT	reality/game show
Adultos vs. Crianças (Adults vs. Children)	Globo	game show
Ilha Record (similar format Desafío)	Record	reality/game show
Soletrando	Globo	game show
The Masked Singer Brasil	Globo	reality/game show
Mestre do Sabor	Globo	reality/game show
Tudo em Família	TV Aparecida	game show
Tá Certo?	TV Cultura	game show
Pra Ganhar É Só Rodar	SBT	game show
Operação Cupido	RedeTV!	game show
Bolsa Família	SBT	game show
Batalha de Família (Family Game Fight!)	Globo	game show
Sobe O Som	Globo	game show
Batalha do Lip Sync (Lip Sync Battle)	Globo	reality/game show
Mystery Duets Brasil	Globo	reality/game show
Drive Thru Okê	SBT	reality/game show
Ex-Maridos Contra Ex-Mulheres	SBT	reality/game show
Minha Mulher que Manda	SBT	reality/game show

=== Globo ===
- Big Brother Brasil
- The Voice Brasil
- The Voice Kids
- Quem Quer Ser um Milionário? (Who Wants to Be a Millionaire?)
- Show dos Famosos (Your Face Sounds Familiar)
- Dança dos Famosos (Dancing with the Stars)
- Ding Dong (Superstar Ding Dong)
- Se vira nos 30 (30 Seconds to Fame)
- Super Chef Celebridades (Top Chef)
- Popstar
- The Wall
- SuperStar (Rising Star)
- Saltibum (Celebrity Splash!)
- Chefe Secreto (Undercover Boss)
- Dança no Gelo (Skating with Celebrities / Dancing on Ice)
- Agora ou Nunca
- Garotada & Cachorrada (reality show about children training dogs)
- Os Iluminados (Keep Your Light Shining)
- Truque Vip (reality show about magical tricks and illusionism with celebrities)
- The Ultimate Fighter: Brazil (The Ultimate Fighter)
- Tem gente atrás (Avanti un altro!)
- Jogo de Panelas (Come Dine with Me)
- Sufoco (The Whole 19 Yards)
- Hipertensão (Fear Factor)
- Maratoma (Wipeout)
- No Limite (Survivor)
- Jogo Duro (Estate of Panic)
- Super Chefinhos
- Super Chef
- De Cara no Muro (Brain Wall)
- Jogo dos 10 (Power of 10)
- Dancinha dos Famosos (Dancing with the Stars Kids)
- Circo do Faustão (Celebrity Circus)
- Soletrando
- Pulsação
- O Jogo (Murder in Small Town X)
- FAMA (Star Academy)
- Acorrentados (Chains of Love)
- Amor a Bordo
- Guerra dos Sonos (Exhausted)
- Video Game
- Jogo da Velha (Hollywood Squares)
- Ponto Fraco (The Weakest Link) (Canceled)
- Contender Series Brasil (The Contender) (future)
- Ninja Warrior Brasil (Ninja Warrior) (future)

=== Record ===
- A Fazenda (The Farm)
- Batalha dos Confeiteiros (Next Great Baker)
- Power Couple
- Dancing Brasil (Dancing with the Stars)
- A Casa (Get The F*ck Out Of My House)
- Canta Comigo (All Together Now)
- Isso Eu Faço
- Muro dos Famosos (Wall of Fame)
- Batalha dos Cozinheiros
- Got Talent Brasil (Got Talent)
- Me Leva Contigo (Taken Out)
- Topa um Acordo? (Let's Make a Deal)
- Além do Peso (Cuestión de peso)
- Ídolos Kids (Idols Kids)
- Amazônia
- Top Model, o Reality
- A Casa da Ana Hickmann
- Game Show
- O Preço Certo (The Price Is Right)
- Gugu bate em sua porta (Opportunity Knocks)
- Ídolos (Idols)
- Distração Fatal (Distraction)
- Troca de Família (Trading Spouses / Wife Swap)
- Brazil's Next Top Model
- O Jogador (PokerFace)
- O Aprendiz (The Apprentice)
- Extreme Makeover Social (Extreme Makeover)
- Simple Life: Mudando de Vida (The Simple Life)
- Sem Saída (Captive)
- Roleta Russa (Russian Roulette)
- Top TV
- Quarta Total
- O Vencedor (The Winner Is) (discontinuation in pursuing the project)
- A Caçada (The Chase) (uncertainty)
- O Cubo (The Cube) (uncertainty)
- Quem Está no Topo? (Who's on Top?) (uncertainty)
- (Iron Chef) (future?)

=== SBT ===
- Bake Off Brasil
- Júnior Bake Off Brasil
- Bake Off Brasil Celebrity
- BBQ Brasil (BBQ Champ)
- Hell's Kitchen: Cozinha sob Pressão
- Roda a Roda Jequiti (Wheel of Fortune)
- Programa Silvio Santos (Takeshi's Castle)
- Passa ou Repassa (Double Dare)
- Pra Ganhar É Só Rodar
- Fábrica de Casamentos
- Jogo das Fichas
- Nada além de Um Minuto (Minute to Win It)
- Rola ou Enrola?
- Fenômenos
- Esquadrão da Moda (What Not to Wear)
- Bomba! (Boom!)
- Cabelo Pantene - O Reality
- Qual é o Seu Talento? (What's Your Talent?)
- Caldeirão da Sorte
- Duelo de Mães
- Dance se Puder
- Máquina da Fama
- Esse Artista Sou Eu (Your Face Sounds Familiar)
- Festival Sertanejo
- Menino de Ouro (Football's Next Star)
- Famoso Quem? (My Name Is)
- Vamos Brincar de Forca
- Cante se Puder (Sing If You Can)
- Se Ela Dança, Eu Danço (So You Think You Can Dance)
- Esquadrão do Amor
- Um Milhão na Mesa (The Million Pound Drop)
- Cantando no SBT
- SOS Casamento
- Romance no Escuro (Dating in the Dark)
- Solitários (Solitary)
- Meu Pai é Melhor que Seu Pai (My Dad Is Better Than Your Dad)
- Topa ou Não Topa (Deal or No Deal)
- Um Contra Cem (1 vs. 100)
- Você Se Lembra? (Amne$ia)
- 10 Anos Mais Jovem (10 Years Younger)
- Identidade Secreta (Identity)
- Só Falta Esposa
- Astros
- Supernanny
- Nada Além da Verdade (The Moment of Truth)
- Quem Manda É o Chefe
- High School Musical: A Seleção
- Tentação
- Você É mais Esperto que um Aluno da Quinta Série? (Are You Smarter than a 5th Grader?)
- Quem Perde, Ganha (The Biggest Loser)
- Vinte e Um (Twenty One)
- Namoro na TV (The Dating Game)
- Curtindo com Reais
- Curtindo com Crianças
- Você É o Jurado
- Ídolos (SBT) (Idols)
- Bailando por um Sonho
- Family Feud Brasil (Family Feud)
- Casamento à Moda Antiga
- O Grande Perdedor
- O Conquistador do Fim do Mundo
- Xaveco-Se Rolar...Rolou (Singled Out)
- Todos contra Um
- Popstars Brasil (Popstars)
- Ilha da Sedução (Temptation Island)
- Sete e Meio (Seven and a half)
- Curtindo uma Viagem
- Casa dos Artistas (Protagonistas)
- Audácia (Greed)
- Qual É a Música? (The Singing Bee)
- Qual é a Musica? (Name That Tune)
- Show do Milhão (Million Show)
- Gol Show
- Nações Unidas
- Cidade contra Cidade
- Casa dos Segredos (Secret Story) (future)
- Cinquenta (50–50) (uncertainty)

=== Band ===
- MasterChef Brasil
- MasterChef Júnior
- MasterChef Profissionais
- Pesadelo na Cozinha (Ramsay's Kitchen Nightmares)
- A Fuga (Raid the Cage)
- O Sócio (The Profit)
- Exathlon Brasil
- O Mundo Segundo os Brasileiros
- X Factor Brasil
- Shark Tank Brasil - Negociando com Tubarões (Shark Tank)
- Bate & Volta
- Sabe ou Não Sabe
- Quem Fica em Pé? (Who's Still Standing?)
- Mulheres Ricas (The Real Housewives)
- Perdidos na Tribo (Ticket To The Tribes)
- Projeto Fashion (Project Runway)
- The Phone – A Missão (The Phone)
- Busão do Brasil (The Bus)
- E24 (Medical reality show)
- Zero Bala
- É o Amor
- A Grande Chance (The Alphabet Game)
- Quem Pode mais? (Battle of the sexes game show)
- Cidade Nota 10 (City vs City)
- Joga Bonito
- Na Pressão
- Sobcontrole
- Território Livre
- Supermarket (Supermarket Sweep)

=== RedeTV! ===
- Hyper QI
- Quiz Show
- Lig Quiz
- O Céu é o Limite (L'eredità)
- Mega Senha (Million Dollar Password)
- Conexão Models
- Operação de Risco
- Entubados
- Dr. Hollywood (Dr. 90210)
- Sob Medida
- The Bachelor Brasil (The Bachelor)
- Estação Teen
- Sexo a 3
- O Último Passageiro (The Last Passenger)
- Taxi do Milão (Cash Cab)
- Receita Pop (Ready Steady Cook)
- The Amazing Race: A Corrida Milionária (The Amazing Race)
- Clube das Mulheres
- GAS Sound
- Insomnia
- Apartamento das Modelos
- Interligado

=== TV Cultura ===
- Tá Certo?
- Quem Sabe, Sabe!
- Ecoprático
- É Proibido Colar

=== TV Aparecida ===
- Revelações
- Revelações Sertanejo
- Tudo em Família

=== Record News ===
- Car Motor Show
- Duelo de Salões
- X Smile Brasil

=== TV Escola ===
- SuperMerendeiras

=== EI BR ===
- Fanáticos Game Show

=== Shoptime ===
- Procura-se um Apresentador!
- O Grande Negócio (future)

=== Multishow ===
- Os Gretchens
- Só pra Parodiar
- Eisenbahn Mestre Cervejeiro
- Humoristinhas
- Casa Bonita
- Fábrica de Estrelas
- Minha Praia
- Geleia do Rock
- As Gostosas e os Geeks (Beauty and the Geek)
- Drag Race Brazil (RuPaul's Drag Race) (future)

=== Fox ===
- The Four Brasil (The Four)
- Corre e Costura

=== Nat Geo ===
- Os Incríveis – O Grande Desafio

=== GNT ===
- The Taste Brasil (The Taste)
- Por Um Fio (Shear Genius)

=== Sony ===
- Brazil's Next Top Model (Top Model)

=== Boomerang ===
- Saindo com minha Mãe
- Temporada de Moda Capricho

=== E! ===
- Drag me as a Queen
- Criador de Celebridades

=== MTV ===
- Are You the One? Brasil (Are You the One?)
- De Férias com o Ex Brasil (Ex on the Beach)
- Catfish Brasil (Catfish)
- Deu Match!
- Legends of Gaming Brasil
- Adotada
- Papito in Love
- Colírios Capricho
- Pimp My Ride Brasil (Pimp My Ride)
- Covernation

== Bulgaria ==
- Risk pecheli, risk gubi (game show, on BulgariaONE, previously on Efir 2/BNT 2 (1994–2000), bTV (2000–2005) and TV7 (2013))
- 10/64 (prime-time Q&A, on Kanal 1; cancelled)
- Bum (Boom) (Q&A, on Evrokom)
- Kosherut (The Hive) (game show, on Msat TV)
- Minuta e mnogo (A Minute Is Too Much) (Q&A show with more difficult questions, on Kanal 1)
- Sdelka ili ne (Deal or No Deal, literally "Deal or Not") (a version of the successful European game show, on Nova Television)
- Stani bogat (Who Wants to Be a Millionaire?) (a version of the popular Q&A, on Nova Television and later on BNT 1 instead.)
- Supershow Nevada (the first Bulgarian game show, created after the fall of socialism in the country)
- Treska za zlato (Gold Fever) (lotto, on bTV (TV); cancelled)
- Tova go znae vsyako hlape (Are You Smarter than a 5th Grader?) (Q&A show with questions from school material from 1st to 5th grade, on bTV)
- Vot na doverie (Vote of Confidence) (show that often features celebrities, on bTV (TV); cancelled)
- Posledniyat Pecheli (Последният печели, The Last Wins) is a show with rounds and questionsof a theme and every theme has a different point prize. If the player wins, he continues to the next game until someone else beats him. The show airs on BNT 1.

== Canada ==
Canadian English-language game and quiz shows have often been aimed towards children and teenagers between the ages of six and 19. A majority of these game shows often run for 30 minutes in each episode. They often derive their formats from game shows produced in the United States, most of them having been run on Canadian networks such as CTV, Global and Citytv.

Although American game and quiz shows are popular in Canada, Canadian residents are not eligible to be contestants on some of them, Wheel of Fortune, Jeopardy! and The Price Is Right being three notable exceptions. Unlike in the US, game show winnings in Canada are not subject to income tax (actually, residents of most countries aside from the US are not subject to income tax on game show winnings).

There are very few Canadian adaptations of American, British, and Dutch-originated quiz shows in the English language. Most, like versions of The Price Is Right, Wheel of Fortune, Jeopardy!, and Family Feud, are in French. Some English-language versions of these shows include Supermarket Sweep, Who Wants to Be a Millionaire?, Deal or No Deal, Are You Smarter Than a 5th Grader?, and Cash Cab. There are also French-language versions of Deal or No Deal, Are You Smarter Than a 5th Grader?, and Cash Cab.

- 5-4-3-2-Run
- Are You Smarter Than a Canadian 5th Grader?
- Le Banquier
- Brain Battle
- Bumper Stumpers
- Cash Cab
- Le Cercle
- Clips
- Definition
- Deal or No Deal Canada
- Design to Win
- Family Feud Canada
- Food For Thought
- Front Page Challenge
- Game On
- La Guerre des clans
- Guess What
- Gutterball Alley
- Headline Hunters
- Inside the Box
- It's Your Move
- Jeux D'Enfants
- Just Like Mom
- Kidstreet
- Let's Make A Deal (1981 version)
- Lingo
- Love Handles
- Love Me, Love Me Not
- The Joke's on Us
- The Last Word
- The Mad Dash
- The Moneymakers
- Les Mordus
- Mr. and Mrs.
- The New Liar's Club
- The Next Line
- Paquet Voleur
- Party Game
- Pitfall
- Reach for the Top
- La Roue Chanceuse
- SmartAsk
- Supermarket Sweep
- Talk About
- Test Pattern
- The Price Is Right Tonight
- This Is the Law
- TimeChase
- Tip of My Tongue
- Uh Oh!
- Video & Arcade Top 10
- Vingt et Un
- Who Wants to Be a Millionaire?
- You Bet Your Ass

== Chile ==
- Atrévase otra vez
- A como de lugar
- ¿Cuánto vale el show?
- Trato Hecho, now ¡Allá tú! (Deal or No Deal)
- Desafío Familiar (Family Feud)
- Diga lo que vale (Chilean version of The Price Is Right)
- Hágase Famoso
- Hit, la fiebre del karaoke (The Singing Bee)
- Hugo (based on the interactive-TV franchise)
- El Juego de Judas
- Juéguesela en el 13
- Jugando a Saber
- Un millón para el mejor
- Nace una estrella
- El Poder del 10 (Power of 10)
- Contrareloj (The $25, 000 Pyramid; literally means "against the clock")
- ¿Quién quiere ser millonario?, now ¿Quién merece ser millonario? (Who Wants to be a Millionaire?)
- ¿Quién soy Yo? (What's My Line?)
- El rival más débil (Chilean version of The Weakest Link)
- La Rueda de la Fortuna (Wheel of Fortune)
- Sábado Gigante
- ¿Sabes más que un niño de 5to básico? (Are You Smarter Than a 5th Grader?)
- Superdupla
- Supermarket (Supermarket Sweep)
- El Tiempo Es Oro
- El último pasajero

== China ==
=== CCTV 1 ===
- Wei Ni Er Zhan I Fight For You (You Deserve It) (2013)
- Mengxiang Hechangtuan 梦想合唱团 (Clash of the Choirs) (2011)
- 正大综艺-墙来啦 (Brain Wall) (2010)
- 超级保姆 (Supernanny)
- Into the Shangri-La 走入香格里拉 (Survivor (franchise)) (2001)

=== Dragon TV ===
- 动洞墙 (Brain Wall)
- Chinese Idol (2013–2014)
- 與星共舞 (Dancing with the Stars) (2014–2015)
- Zheng Fen Duo Miao 争分夺秒 (Minute to Win It) (2013)
- So You Think You Can Dance: Wǔ Lín Zhēngbà (So You Think You Can Dance) (2013)
- Mèng lìfāng 梦立方 (The Cube) (2012–2013)
- MasterChef China (2012–2013)
- 发动奇迹 (Shear Genius) (2011)
- China's Got Talent (2010–2014)
- The Amazing Race: China Rush (2010–2012)
- Jiātíng Sài Lè Sài 家庭赛乐赛 (Family Feud) (2010–2011)

=== Zhejiang TV ===
- So You Think You Can Dance: Zhōngguó Hǎo Wǔdǎo (So You Think You Can Dance) (2014)
- Who dares to stand out? 谁敢站出来 (Breakaway) (2013)
- Splash! (Celebrity Splash!) (2013)
- The Voice of China (2012–2015)
- Wangpai die zhong die 王牌碟中谍 (PokerFace) (2012–2014)
- Xin Tiao A Gen Ting 心跳阿根廷 (101 Ways to Leave a Gameshow) (2012)
- Dance Your Ass off China (越跳越漂亮) (Dance Your Ass Off) (2012)
- Ai Chang Cai Hui Ying 爱唱才会赢 (Deal or No Deal) (2008–2010)

=== Jiangsu TV ===
- Zhima kaimen 芝麻开门 (Raid the Cage)
- Yizhan Daodi 一站到底 (Who's Still Standing?)
- The Biggest Loser: 减出我人生 (The Biggest Loser)
- Kàn Jiàn Nǐ De Shēng Yīn 看见你的声音 (I Can See Your Voice) (2016)
- Sasuke China: X Warrior (Ninja Warrior) (2015)
- If You Are the One 非诚勿扰 (Taken Out) (2010)

=== Hunan TV ===
- The Bachelor 黄金单身汉 (2016)
- The X Factor: Zhongguo Zui Qiang Yin (2013)
- Nuren ru ge 女人如歌 (The Winner Is) (2012)
- Bǎi biàn dà kā xiù 百变大咖秀 (Your Face Sounds Familiar) (2012)
- Let's Date 我们约会吧 (Taken Out) (2009)
- 以一敌百 (1 vs. 100) (2008–2010)
- Strictly Come Dancing China 舞动奇迹 (Dancing with the Stars) (2007–2011)
- Wŭ nián jí jiù zhù duì 五年级救助队 (Are You Smarter than a 5th Grader?) (2007)
- 名声大震 (Just the Two of Us)

=== Beijing TV ===
- Quan Shi Ni De 全是你的 (The Price Is Right) (2015)
- Dong Gan Xiu Chang 动感秀场 (Deal or No Deal) (2007)

=== CCTV 2 ===
- 味觉大战 (The Taste) (2013)
- The Biggest Loser: 超级减肥王 (The Biggest Loser) (2013)
- Gòu Wù Jiē 购物街 (The Price Is Right) (2007–2011)
- Xìng yùn 52 xìng yùn kè táng 幸运52 幸运课堂 (Are You Smarter than a 5th Grader?) (2007)
- Lucky 52 (1998–2008)

=== Guangdong TV ===
- Cash Cab 超级现金车 (Cash Cab) (2012)
- Wanmei Anlian 完美暗恋 (Dating in the Dark) (2011)
- Shi Bei Qian Jin 十倍钱进 (Power of 10) (2009)
- Wǔ nián jí chā bān shēng 五年级插班生 (Are You Smarter than a 5th Grader?) (2007)
- Shui Xiang Cheng Wei Bai Wan Fu Weng 谁想成为百万富翁 (Who Wants to Be a Millionaire?) (2002–2003)

=== CCTV 3 ===
- 中国正在听 (Rising Star) (2014)

=== Tianjin TV ===
- Nĭ néng bì yè ma? 你能毕业吗? (Are You Smarter than a 5th Grader?) (2007)

=== Shenzhen TV ===
- The Amazing Race China
- 合伙中国人 (Dragons' Den) (2016)
- Shéi bĭ shéi cōng ming 谁比谁聪明 (Are You Smarter than a 5th Grader?) (2007)

=== Sichuan TV ===
- Wo Ai Wo De Zhu Guo (I Love My Country) (2009)
- China's Next Top Model (2008–2010)

=== Shandong TV ===
- Rang Meng Xiang Fei · Zhi Ming Yi Ji 让梦想飞·智命一击 (Russian Roulette) (2015–2016)

=== Liaoning TV ===
- The X Factor: Ji Qing Chang Xiang (2011–2012)

=== Jiangxi TV ===
- Challenge the Culture Masters 挑战文化名人 (The Chase) (2014)

=== Guizhou TV ===
- Bai Wan Zhi Duo Xing 百万智多星 (Who Wants to Be a Millionaire?) (2007–2008)

=== Hubei TV ===
- I Love China (I Love My Country) (2012)

=== Guangxi TV ===
- 猜的就是你 (Identity) (2013)

=== Shaanxi TV ===
- Bù kǎo bù zhī dào 不考不知道 (Are You Smarter than a 5th Grader?) (2007)

=== Chongqing TV ===
- China's Next Top Model (2015)

=== Xiamen Star ===
- Lao ba pin ba 老爸拼吧 (My Dad Is Better Than Your Dad) (2013)
- The Kids Are All Right 鸡蛋碰石头 (The Kids Are All Right) (2013)

=== Nanjing TV ===
- Tài ruò liú qiáng·zhìzhě wéi wáng 汰弱留强·智者为王 (The Weakest Link) (2002–2003)
- Zhìzhě wéi wáng 智者为王 (The Weakest Link) (2004)

== Colombia ==
- 100 Colombianos Dicen (Colombian version of Family Feud) (Caracol TV 2002–2004, 2017)
- Do Re Millones: La Orquesta de la fortuna (Sounds Like A Million) (Caracol TV 2012–2014)
- El precio es Correcto (Colombian version of The Price Is Right) (Caracol TV 2011–2014)
- ¡En sus marcas, listos, ya! (On your marks, get set, go!) (Caracol TV 2011–2012)
- La Rueda de la Suerte, now La Rueda de la Fortuna (Colombian version of Wheel of Fortune) (Caracol TV 1998–1999, RCN 2013–2015)
- Cazadores de la fortuna (Caracol TV 1998–1999)
- 1 vs. 100 (RCN 2011–2012)
- Locos x la tele, (TV Maniacs) (Caracol TV 2015)
- El Jugador (PokerFace) (RCN 2006–2007)
- Hay Trato! (Deal or No Deal) (Caracol TV 2004)
- Un minuto para ganar (Caracol TV 2010–2012, CityTV 2014)
- Boom! (Caracol TV 2017–present)
- The Wall (Caracol TV 2018)
- Nada más que la verdad (Canal Caracol 2007)

== Croatia ==
- 1 protiv 100 (1 vs. 100) (2008–2011)
- Cocktail Master (2025)
- Direktor svemira (Taskmaster) (2021)
- Dođi, pogodi, osvoji (The Price Is Right) (2021–2025)
- Farma (The Farm) (2008–2020, 2025–present)
- Fight of Nations: Put do pobjede (2024–present)
- Genijalci (2005–2007)
- Godina za pamćenje (Oh, wat een jaar!) (2023–2024)
- Gospodin Savršeni (The Bachelor) (2018–present)
- Hrvatski Top Model (America's Next Top Model) (2008–2010)
- Hugo (1996–2004)
- Igra chefova (משחקי השף) (2026–present)
- Izazov! (Jeopardy!) (1998–2000)
- Jadranske igre (2011–2012)
- Joker (2024)
- Kolo sreće (Wheel of Fortune) (1993–2002, 2015–2017)
- Kruške i jabuke (Ready Steady Cook) (1999–2005, 2015–2016)
- Kviskoteka (1980–1995)
- Ljepotice i genijalci (Beauty and the Geek) (2019)
- Love Island Adria
- Ljubav je na selu (Farmer Wants a Wife) (2008–present)
- Ma lažeš! (Would I Lie to You?) (2021–2022)
- Masked Singer (2022–2023)
- Modul 8 (1994–2002)
- Najslabija karika (Weakest Link) (2004–2010)
- Ne zaboravi stihove (Don't Forget the Lyrics!) (2008–2009)
- Operacija trijumf (2008–2009)
- Pet na pet (Family Feud) (2014–2016, 2018)
- Ples sa zvijezdama (Dancing with the Stars) (2006–present)
- Pobijedi Šolu (Beat the Star) (2009)
- Potjera (The Chase) (2013–present)
  - Superpotjera (Beat the Chasers) (2023–present)
- Shopping kraljica (2015–2020)
- Srcolovka (The Dating Game) (2004–2005)
- Superpar (2019–present)
- Supertalent (Got Talent) (2009–present)
- Survivor Croatia (2005, 2012, 2022–present)
- Sve u 7 (Succes verzekerd) (2011–2013)
- Tko bi rekao? (Wer weiß denn sowas?) (2026–present)
- Tko to tamo pjeva? (I Can See Your Voice) (2024–present)
- Tko želi biti milijunaš? (Who Wants to Be a Millionaire?) (2002–2010, 2019–present)
- Tog se nitko nije sjetio! (Pointless) (2013–2015)
- The Traitors
- Trenutak istine (Nada más que la verdad) (2008–2009)
- Tri, dva, jedan – kuhaj! (2014–2022)
- Turbo Limach Show (1992–2003)
- Uzmi ili ostavi (Deal or No Deal) (2005–2009)
- Večera za 5 (Come Dine with Me) (2007–present)
- Veto (Das Quiz mit Jörg Pilawa) (2004)
- Volim Hrvatsku (I Love My Country) (2012–2026)
- Wipeout (2009)
- Zvijezde pjevaju (Just the Two of Us) (2007–2024)
- Zvjezdice (2015–2018)

== Czech Republic ==
- 5 proti 5 (Czech Republic's original version of Family Feud)
- Chcete být milionářem? (Czech Republic's version of Who Wants to Be a Millionaire?)
- AZ-kvíz
- AZ-kvíz Junior
- Co na to Češi (Czech Republic's version of Family Feud)
- Hádej kdo jsem? (Czech Republic's version of What's My Line)
- Milionář (Another Czech Republic's version of Who Wants to Be a Millionaire?)
- Nejslabsi! Mate Padaka! (The Weakest Link)
- Pálí vám to? (Czech Republic's version of Polish Daję słowo)
- Riskuj! (Jeopardy!)
- Na slepo (Czech Republic's version of Polish Gra W Ciemno)
- Na lovu (Czech Republic's version of The Chase)

== Denmark ==
- 1 mod 100 (1 vs. 100)
- Hvem vil være millionær? (Who Wants to Be a Millionaire?)
  - Hvem vil være millionær? Junior (Who Wants to Be a Millionaire? Junior)
- Deal or No Deal
- Det Svageste Led (Weakest Link)
- Er Du Klogere End En 10-årig? (Are You Smarter Than a 5th Grader?)
- Fup eller Fakta (Call My Bluff)
- Hul i Hovedet (Human Tetris)
- Jeopardy!
- Lykkehjulet (Wheel of Fortune)
- Paradise Hotel
- Så det Synger (The Singing Bee)

Reality shows:

- Med kniven for struben (Ramsay's Kitchen Nightmares)
- Skønheden og nørden (Beauty and the Geek)
- So You Think You Can Dance
- Vild med Dans (Dancing with the Stars)

== Finland ==
=== Original Finnish series ===
- Far Out (game show where two teams did tasks in several European cities; the week's winning team, voted by the TV audience, went to a different city for the following week; the losers had to come back to Finland)
- Giljotiini (quiz show where you need to know who doesn't know)
- Kymppitonni (word guessing game)
- Maailman ympäri (geographical quiz show)
- Räsypokka (strip poker show)
- Reitti 44 (trip around the world in two teams, including tasks)
- Retsi ja Jykke (quiz show, followed by spin-off shows by the same team, until the death of Jyrki Otila [Jykke])
- SF-Studio (entertaining quiz show about the latest news)
- Suuri kupla (children's game show about the world of comics)
- Tuttu juttu (game show full of roses and love about knowing your life partner)

=== Finnish versions of international series ===
- Biisikärpänen (Finnish version of Singing Bee)
- Fiksumpi kuin koululainen (Finnish version of Are You Smarter than a 5th Grader?)
- Greed
- Haluatko miljonääriksi? (Finnish version of Who Wants to Be a Millionaire?)
- Heikoin lenkki (Finnish version of The Weakest Link)
- Jeopardy!
- Meidän isä on parempi kuin teidän isä (Finnish version of My Dad Is Better Than Your Dad)
- Mitä Maksaa (Finnish version of The Price Is Right)
- Napakymppi (Finnish version of The Dating Game, not considered officially as the same program in the first years of the show, but eventually the producers admitted the resemblance)
- Onnenpyörä (Finnish version of Wheel of Fortune)
- Ota tai jätä (Finnish version of Deal or No Deal)
- Power of 10
- Tuntemattomat (Finnish version of Identity)
- Tuubi (Finnish version of Saturday Night Tube)
- Uutisvuoto (Finnish version of Have I Got News for You)
- Voitto kotiin (Finnish version of Family Feud)

== France ==
- V.O
- L'Appel gagnant
- Le Jeu des 1 000 euros (France Inter)
- C koi ta zik (France ô)
- La Toile infernale (Canal J)
- Le Quiz du chrétien en marche (KTO)
- Télé Match (RTF Télévision)
- Les Trésors du sixième sens (Disney Channel France)

=== Gulli ===
- Un Dîner Presque Parfait (Come Dine with Me)
- In ze boîte (2007–2020)

=== Canal+ ===
- Au micro !
- Loups-garous
- Le News Show
- Happy Hour (2010–2014)
- Burger Quiz (2001–2002)

=== La Cinq ===
- Que le meilleur gagne (Everybody's Equal) (1991–1992)
- La Ligne de chance (1991)
- Télé Contact (Love Connection) (1990–1991)
- Je compte sur toi (1990)
- La Porte Magique (Break the Bank) (1987–1988)
- C'est beau la vie (1986)
- Cherchez la femme (W le donne) (1986)
- Pentathlon (1986)

=== TF1 ===
- Les 12 Coups de Midi (L'eredità)
- Danse avec les stars (Dancing with the Stars)
- Le Grand Concours (Britain's Brainiest)
- Le Grand Quiz
- ÉXathlon France
- Koh-Lanta (Survivor)
- Ninja Warrior: Le Parcours des héros (Ninja Warrior)
- Quatre mariages pour une lune de miel
- Qui veut gagner des millions ? (Who Wants to Be a Millionaire?)
- Star Academy
- Une Famille en Or (Family Feud)
- Vendredi tout est permis avec Arthur
- The Voice: la plus belle voix
- The Wheel : Le Cercle des 7 (2023)
- Welcome Back (2022)
- Good Singers (2020–2022)
- District Z (2020–2021)
- C'est déjà Noël (2018)
- The Wall : Face au mur (2017–2018)
- Super Nanny (Supernanny) (2016)
- Le Grand Blind test (2015–2018)
- Wish List : La Liste de vos envies (Win Your Wish List) (2015–2016)
- Boom: Gagner ne tient qu'à un fil! (Boom!) (2015)
- Pas une seconde à perdre! (Five Minutes to a Fortune) (2014)
- The Winner Is (2014)
- Splash: Le Grand Plongeon (Celebrity Splash!) (2013)
- Au Pied du Mur! (1 vs. 100) (2012–2014)
- Tout le monde aime la France! (I Love My Country) (2012)
- Money Drop (The Million Pound Drop) (2011–2017)
- Arthur et les Incollables (2011)
- Pouch' le bouton (Ant & Dec's Push the Button) (2011)
- MasterChef France (2010–2015)
- L'amour est aveugle (Dating in the Dark) (2010–2014)
- Le Grand Show des enfants (2010–2011)
- Quinze a un (Fifteen to One) (2009–2019)
- Le Plus grand quiz de France (The People's Quiz) (2009–2011)
- Identity (2009–2010)
- Petites Stars : Le Grand Soir (2009)
- La Bataille des Chorales (Clash of the Choirs) (2009)
- Qui peut battre… ? (Beat the Star) (2008–2010)
- Dance Floor : Qui sera le plus fort ? (Dance Machine) (2008)
- Jouez pour 5 fois plus (Power of 10) (2008)
- Le Grand Quiz du cerveau (2007–2011)
- 1 contre 100 (1 vs. 100) (2007–2008)
- Je suis une célébrité, sortez-moi de là ! (I'm a Celebrity...Get Me Out of Here!) (2006–2019)
- Crésus (L'eredità) (2005–2006)
- À prendre ou à laisser (Deal or No Deal) (2004–2010)
- La Ferme Célébrités (The Farm) (2004–2010)
- Le Champion de la télé (2003–2015)
- Zone Rouge (The Chair) (2003–2005)
- Fear Factor (2003–2004)
- Attention à la marche ! (2001–2010)
- Allo quiz (2001)
- Le Bigdil (Let's Make a Deal/Big Deal) (1998–2004)
- Mokshû Patamû (Snakes and Ladders) (1997)
- Des Copains en or (Family Feud) (1996–1997)
- L'Or à l'appel (1996–1997)
- Chéri Chéries (Man O Man) (1995–1999)
- L'Affaire du Siècle (Sale of the Century) (1995)
- Le Chéri de ces dames (Man O Man) (1995)
- Le Trésor de Pago Pago (1993–1994)
- Millionnaire (1991–1999)
- Jeopardy! (1989–1992)
- Interglace (1987–1995)
- Tournez Manège! (The Dating Game) (1985–2010)
- Anagram (1985)
- Microludic (1983–1984)
- Super défi (1983)
- Atout Cœur (1982–1984)
- L'inspecteur mène l'enquête (1975–1981)
- Réponse à tout (1972–1982)
- La Règle d'or (1971)
- Le Francophonissime (1969–1981)
- Le Schmilblic (1969–1970)
- Jeux sans frontières (1965–1967)
- La Tête et les Jambes (1965–1966)
- Interneige (1964–1968)
- L'Homme du XXe siècle (1961–1964)
- Bimbo face aux Intello (Beauty and the Geek) (Cancelled)

=== France 2 ===
- 100% logique: La réponse est sous vos yeux (The 1% Club)
- Chacun son tour
- The Floor, à la conquête du sol
- Fort Boyard
- Intervilles
- N'oubliez pas les paroles ! (Don't Forget the Lyrics!)
- Le Quiz des Champions
- Tout le monde a son mot à dire (Alphabetical)
- Tout le monde joue
- Tout le monde veut prendre sa place
- Y'a pas d'erreur? (2021–2022)
- C'est déjà Noël (2018)
- 5 anneaux d'or (5 Gold Rings) (2017–2018)
- Pop Show (2015–2020)
- Un mot peut en cacher un autre (2015–2021)
- Joker (2015–2016, 2018)
- Pop Show (2015–2016)
- Face à la bande (2014)
- Le Cube (The Cube) (2013)
- Avec ou sans joker (2013)
- Volte Face (Trust) (2012)
- Seriez-vous un bon expert? (2011–2013)
- Chéri(e), fais les valises! (2011)
- On n'demande qu'à en rire (2010–2014)
- Réveillez vos méninges (2010–2011)
- En toutes lettres (The Alphabet Game) (2009–2011)
- Le 4e Duel (Duel) (2008–2013)
- Incroyables Expériences (2008–2012)
- Secret Story (2007–2015)
- Carbone 14 (2006)
- Le marathon des jeux TV (Gameshow Marathon) (2006)
- Qui est le bluffeur? (Dirty Rotten Cheater) (2006)
- Millionnaire (2004–2008)
- Le Brise-cœur (2004)
- Code de la route (2003–2011)
- La Cible (2003–2007)
- Tout vu tout lu (Azzardo) (2003–2006)
- Le Coffre (The Vault) (2003–2004)
- Le Grand Blind Test (2003)
- La Gym des neurones (2001–2002)
- Le Juste Euro (The Price Is Right) (2001–2002)
- Le Numéro gagnant (Winning Lines) (2001–2002)
- La Gym des neurones (2000–2002)
- Les Forges du désert (1999–2000)
- Et 1, et 2, et 3 ! (1999)
- Les Cinglés de la télé (1999)
- Passe à ton voisin (Hot Streak) (1997)
- Qui est qui? (Who's Who?) (1996–2002)
- Les Bons Génies (Match Game) (1996)
- Les Z'amours (The Newlywed Game) (1995–2021)
- Le Trophée Campus (1995)
- N'oubliez pas votre brosse à dents (Don't Forget Your Toothbrush) (1994–1996)
- Les Trésors du monde (1994)
- Un pour tous (1993)
- Que le meilleur gagne (Everybody's Equal) (1992–2015)
- Le Jeu / Score à battre (The Main Event) (1992–1993)
- La Piste de Xapatan (1992)
- Dingbats (1992)
- Pyramide (The $10,000 Pyramid) (1991–2015)
- Question de Charme (The Better Sex) (1991–1992)
- Motus (Lingo) (1990–2019)
- Les Clés de Fort Boyard (Fort Boyard) (1990–1991)
- Le Chevalier Du Labyrinthe (Knightmare) (1990–1991)
- Dessinez, c'est gagné ! (Win, Lose or Draw) (1989–1993)
- Rira, rira pas (1989–1990)
- Trivial Pursuit (1988–2003)
- L'Arche d'or (Strike It Rich) (1988–1989)
- Les Mariés de l'A2 (The Newlywed Game) (1987–1992)
- Micro Kid (1984–1985)
- Le Grand Raid (1984–1985)
- Mardi Cinéma (1982–2018)
- L'Academie des 9 (Hollywood Squares) (1982–1987)
- La Chasse aux trésors (Treasure Hunt) (1981–1984)
- Jeudi Cinéma (1980–1981)
- La Course autour du monde (1976–1984)
- Interneige (1976–1981)
- La Tête et les Jambes (1975–1978)
- Y'a un truc (1975–1976)
- Des chiffres et des lettres (1972–2006)
- Jeux sans frontières (1972–1999)
- Monsieur Cinéma (1967–1980)
- Le Mot le plus long (1965–1970)

=== M6 ===
- Pékin Express (Peking Express)
- 99 à battre (99 to Beat)
- L'amour est dans le pré (Farmer Wants a Wife)
- La France a un incroyable talent (Got Talent)
- Cauchemar en cuisine (Ramsay's Kitchen Nightmares)
- Le Juste Prix (The Price is Right)
- Le Maillon Faible (Weakest Link)
- Le Meilleur Pâtissier (Bake Off)
- Patron incognito (Undercover Boss)
- La Roue de la fortune (Wheel of Fortune)
- Top Chef
- Que le meilleur gagne (Everybody's Equal) (2024–2025)
- Qui est la taupe? (The Mole) (2015)
- Qu'est-ce que je sais vraiment ? (2014–2016)
- Rising Star (2014)
- Un air de star (Your Face Sounds Familiar) (2013)
- 60 secondes chrono (Minute to Win It) (2012–2013)
- X Factor (2011)
- Total Wipeout (Wipeout) (2009)
- Maman cherche l’amour (Must Love Kids) (2008–2009)
- Drôle de réveil ! (2007–2009)
- Êtes-vous plus fort qu’un élève de 10 ans? (Are You Smarter than a 5th Grader?) (2007)
- Club (2006–2009)
- L'Alternative Live (2006–2008)
- Super Nanny (Supernanny) (2005–2010)
- Top Model (2005–2007)
- On a échangé nos mamans (Wife Swap) (2004–2010)
- Nouvelle Star (Idol) (2003–2010, 2017–2023)
- Bachelor, le gentleman célibataire (The Bachelor) (2003–2005)
- Popstars (2001–2007)
- Loft Story (Big Brother) (2001–2002)
- Mission 1 million (Greed) (2000)
- Zygomusic (1990–1992)
- Hit Hit Hit Hourra (1987–1992)

=== France 3 ===
- La Carte aux trésors
- Mot de passe (Million Dollar Password/Password)
- Questions pour un Champion (Going for Gold)
- Slam
- Duels en familles (2022–2026)
- Jouons à la maison (Let's Ask America) (2020–2021)
- 8 chances de tout gagner ! (2016–2022)
- Trouvez l'intrus (2016–2022)
- Harry (2012–2018)
- Personne n'y avait pensé! (Pointless) (2011–2021)
- L'Étoffe des champions (2011)
- Mission Millenium : Le Masque de Chac (2010)
- Le Tournoi d'orthographe (2009–2011)
- La Liste gagnante (The Rich List) (2009)
- Des chiffres et des lettres (2006–2024)
- Télé la question (That's the Question) (2005–2006)
- Tac O Tac, gagnant à vie (2004–2006)
- Décrochez vos vacances (2002–2007)
- Mission Pirattak (1999–2000)
- Le Kadox (Hollywood Squares) (1998–2000)
- Tout en musique (Keynotes) (1995–1996)
- Fa Si La Chanter (Name That Tune) (1994–2010)
- Cluedo (1994–1995)
- Les Mondes fantastiques (The Crystal Maze) (1992–1995)
- Hugo Délire (Hugo) (1992–1994)
- Micro Kid's (1991–1997)
- Génies en Herbe (1985–1995)
- Les Jeux de 20 heures (1976–1987)
- Les Petits Papiers de Noël (1975–1984)

=== C8 ===
- Hold Up!
- Strike! (2018–2019)
- Couple ou pas Couple? (2017–2018)
- Family Battle (Family Feud) (2017)
- Guess My Age (2016–2017)
- Still Standing : Qui passera à la trappe ? (Who's Still Standing?) (2016)
- Projet Fashion (Project Runway) (2015)
- À prendre ou à laisser (Deal or No Deal) (2014–2021)
- L'Œuf ou la Poule? (2014–2017)
- Popstars – le duel (Popstars) (2013)
- Nouvelle Star (Idol) (2012–2016)
- Amazing Race : la plus grande course autour du monde! (2012)
- Bachelor, le gentleman célibataire (The Bachelor) (2003–2005)

=== TMC ===
- Burger Quiz (2018–2020)
- Got to Dance: Le Meilleur Danseur (Got to Dance) (2015)
- Canapé Quiz (Hollywood Game Night) (2014)
- Le Mur Infernal (Brain Wall) (2007)

=== W9 ===
- L'Île de la tentation (Temptation Island)
- Hotel hell (Hotel Hell)
- Le convoi de l'extrême (Ice Road Truckers)
- Ax men (Ax Men)
- Swamp people: chasseurs de croco
- Séduis-moi...Si tu peux! (Taken Out) (2013)
- Les Marseillais (2012–2022)
- Les Ch'tis (2011–2014)
- La meileure danse (2011–2012)
- Taxi Cash (Cash Cab) (2010)
- X Factor (2009)
- Menu W9 (Takeshi's Castle) (2006)

=== NT1 ===
- You Can Dance (So You Think You Can Dance)
- Secret Story (2016–2017)
- MasterChef France (2015)
- Super Nanny (Supernanny) (2013–2018)
- Bachelor, le gentleman célibataire (The Bachelor) (2013–2016)
- Les Vraies Housewives (The Real Housewives) (2013)

=== NRJ 12 ===
- L'Academie des 9 (Hollywood Squares) (2015)
- Quizmax (Quizmania) (2007)

=== France 4 ===
- Qui chante le plus juste ? (2013)
- La Porte ouverte a toutes les fenêtres (Hollywood Squares) (2009–2010)

=== France 5 ===
- Madame, Monsieur, bonsoir (2006–2008)
- 100 % Question (100%) (1998–2004)

== Germany ==
- Kinder Ruck Zuck (kids German version of Bruce Forsyth's Hot Streak) (Tele 5)

=== ZDF ===
- 1, 2 oder 3 (Runaround)
- Wetten, dass..?
- Der Quiz-Champion
- 4 geben alles! (2016)
- Das Spiel beginnt! (2015–2020)
- Rette die Million! (The Million Pound Drop) (2013)
- Deutschlands Superhirn (2011–2016)
- Topfgeldjäger (2010–2015)
- Auge um Auge (Dog Eat Dog) (2002)
- Ca$h—Das eine Million Mark-Quiz (Greed) (2000–2001)
- Die Pyramide (Pyramid) (1978–1994)
- Die Montagsmaler (1974–1996, 2018)
- Der große Preis (1974–1993, 2002–2003)
- Dalli Dalli (1971–1986)
- Der goldene Schuß (The Golden Shot) (1964–1970)

=== Das Erste ===
- 20xx – Das Quiz
- Gefragt–Gejagt (The Chase)
- Klein gegen Groß
- Quizduell
- Flieg mit mir! (2017)
- Paarduell (2016–2017)
- Spiel für dein Land - Das größte Quiz Europas (2015–2017)
- Sing wie dein Star (Your Face Sounds Familiar) (2014)
- Null Gewinnt (Pointless) (2012–2013)
- Opdenhövels Countdown (2012–2013)
- Kennen Sie Deutschland? (2009)
- Land und Liebe (Farmer Wants a Wife) (2005) (NDR Fernsehen)
- Das Quiz mit Jörg Pilawa (2001–2021)
- Geld oder Liebe (1989–2014)
- SuperGrips (Blockbusters) (1988–1995)
- Auf Los geht's los (1977–1986)
- Schnickschnack (Match Game) (1975–1977)
- Am laufenden Band (The Generation Game) (1974–1979)
- Acht nach 8 (1973)
- Spiel ohne Grenzen (1965–1999)
- Einer wird gewinnen (1964–2014)
- Was bin ich? (What's My Line?) (1961–1989) (Bayerischer Rundfunk)
- Haetten Sie's gewusst? (Twenty-One) (1958–1969)
- Tick-Tack-Quiz (Tic-Tac-Dough) (1958–1967)

=== RTL ===
- Wer wird Millionär? (Who Wants to Be a Millionaire?)
- Die 5-Millionen-SKL-Show
- Deutschland sucht den Superstar (Idol)
- Ich bin ein Star – Holt mich hier raus! (I'm a Celebrity...Get Me Out of Here!)
- Let's Dance (Dancing with the Stars)
- All Together Now
- The Wall (2017–2018)
- It Takes 2 (Just the Two of Us) (2017)
- 500 - Die Quiz-Arena (500 Questions) (2016–2017)
- Ninja Warrior Germany (Ninja Warrior) (2016)
- Hartwichs 100! Daniel testet die Deutschen (2015)
- Der Restauranttester (Ramsay's Kitchen Nightmares) (2014–2015)
- Rising Star (2014)
- Familien-Duell - Prominenten-Special (Family Feud) (2013–2014)
- Take Me Out - Die neue Dating-Show (Taken Out) (2013)
- Der VIP Bus – Promis auf Pauschalreise (Coach Trip) (2013)
- Die Pool Champions - Promis unter Wasser (Celebrity Splash!) (2013)
- Es kann nur e1nen geben (2011–2013)
- The Cube – Besiege den Würfel! (The Cube) (2011)
- Undercover Boss (2011)
- 101 Wege aus der Härtesten Show der Welt (101 Ways to Leave a Gameshow) (2010)
- Dating im Dunkeln (Dating in the Dark) (2010)
- Die Farm (The Farm) (2010)
- 5 gegen Jauch (2009–2021)
- Ab Durch die Wand (Brain Wall) (2009)
- Papa gesucht (Must Love Kids) (2009)
- 1 gegen 100 (1 vs. 100) (2008)
- Das Supertalent (Got Talent) (2007–2021, 2024–2025)
- Dancing on Ice (2006)
- Rach, der Restauranttester (Ramsay's Kitchen Nightmares) (2005–2013, 2017)
- Peking Express (2005)
- Bauer sucht Frau (Farmer Wants a Wife) (2005)
- Teufels Küche Deutschland (Hell's Kitchen) (2005)
- Die Super Nanny (Supernanny) (2004–2011)
- Big Boss (The Apprentice) (2004)
- Fear Factor (2004)
- Die Bachelorette (The Bachelorette) (2004)
- Der Bachelor (The Bachelor) (2003–2011)
- Die 5-Millionen-SKL-Show (2001–2009)
- Der Schwächste fliegt! (The Weakest Link) (2001–2002)
- Big Brother Germany (2000–2011)
- Quiz Einundzwanzig (Twenty-One) (2000–2002)
- Star Weekend (Hollywood Squares) (2000)
- Jeopardy! (1994–1998)
- Die 100.000 Mark Show (predecessor to The National Lottery Big Ticket) (1993–2023)
- Aber Hallo (1993–1995)
- Familien-Duell (Family Feud) (1992–2003)
- The Gong Show (1992–1993)
- Riskant! (Jeopardy!) (1990–1993)
- Der Preis ist heiß (The Price Is Right) (1989–1997)

=== SAT.1 ===
- Das 1% Quiz (The 1% Club)
- 99 – Wer schlägt sie alle? (99 to Beat)
- Das große Allgemeinwissensquiz
- Promi Big Brother
- The Voice of Germany
- The Voice Kids
- Das große Backen (The Great British Bake Off)
- Mein Mann kann
- 5 Gold Rings (2020–2021)
- Genial daneben – Das Quiz (2018–2020)
- Fort Boyard) (2018)
- Newtopia - Vollkommenes Glück oder totales Chaos? (Utopia) (2015)
- Keep your Money (The Million Pound Drop) (2015)
- Mission Familie (Supernanny) (2014)
- Hell's Kitchen Deutschland (Hell's Kitchen) (2014)
- Got to Dance (2013–2014)
- The Taste (2013)
- The Biggest Loser Germany (2012–2016)
- The Winner Is (2012)
- Ab durch die Mitte – Das schnellste Quiz der Welt (Who's Still Standing?) (2012)
- Ich liebe Deutschland (I Love My Country) (2011)
- Die perfekte Minute (Minute to Win It) (2010–2014)
- Deutschlands MeisterKoch (MasterChef) (2010)
- You Can Dance (So You Think You Can Dance) (2010)
- Rich List – Jede Antwort zählt (The Rich List (2007–2008)
- Das weiß doch jedes Kind! (Are You Smarter than a 5th Grader?) (2007–2008)
- Dancing on Ice (2006–2019)
- Deal or No Deal (Deal or No Deal) (2005–2008)
- Deal or No Deal – Die Show der Glücksspirale (Deal or No Deal) (2005–2008)
- Der MillionenDeal (Deal or No Deal) (2004)
- Die Gong-Show (The Gong Show) (2003)
- Die Quiz Show (It's Your Chance of a Lifetime) (2000–2004)
- Die Chance deines Lebens (predecessor to Deal or No Deal) (2000)
- Die Stunde der Wahrheit (Happy Family Plan) (1999–2003)
- Sommer sucht Sprosse (Singled Out) (1997)
- Jeder gegen jeden (Fifteen to One) (1996–2001)
- Hast Du Worte? (Pyramid) (1996–1999)
- Bube, Dame, Hörig (Card Sharks) (1996–1999)
- XXO – Fritz & Co (Hollywood Squares) (1995–1997)
- 5 mal 5 (Lingo) (1993–1994)
- Geh aufs Ganze! (Let's Make a Deal) (1992–1997)
- Punkt, Punkt, Punkt (Match Game) (1992–1994)
- Bingo (1991–1992)
- Krypton Faktor (The Krypton Factor) (1991)
- Fort Boyard – Ein Spiel für Abenteurer (1990–1991)
- Glücksrad (Wheel of Fortune) (1988–1998)

=== VOX ===
- Sing meinen Song – Das Tauschkonzert
- Die Höhle der Löwen (Dragons' Den)
- Die Rote Kugel (2021)
- X Factor Germany (2010–2012)
- mieten, kaufen, wohnen (2008–2016)
- Power of 10 (2008)
- Das Perfekte Dinner (Come Dine with Me) (2006)
- Puls Limit: Jeder Herzschlag zählt (The Chair) (2003)
- Hast du Töne? (Name That Tune) (1999–2001)
- Kochduell (Ready Steady Cook) (1997–2005)

=== ProSieben ===
- The Voice of Germany
- Germany's Next Topmodel
- Get The F*ck Out Of My House (2018–2019)
- Got to Dance (2013–2015)
- Beauty & The Nerd (Beauty and the Geek) (2013)
- 17 Meter (The Whole 19 Yards) (2011)
- Solitary (2010)
- The Biggest Loser Germany (2009)
- WipeOut – Heul nicht, lauf! (Wipeout) (2009)
- Singing Bee (The Singing Bee) (2008)
- Survivor: Überwinde.Überliste.Überlebe! (Survivor) (2007)
- Gameshow-Marathon (Gameshow Marathon) (2007)
- Stars auf Eis (Dancing on Ice) (2007)
- Gülcan und Collien ziehen aufs Land (The Simple Life)
- Schlag den Raab (Beat the Star) (2006–2015)
- Popstars (2003–2012)
- Fort Boyard – Stars auf Schatzsuche (Fort Boyard) (2000–2002)
- Der Maulwurf – Die Abenteuershow (The Mole) (2000–2001)

=== Kabel Eins ===
- Fort Boyard (2011)
- The Biggest Loser Germany (2010–2011)
- Quiz Taxi (Cash Cab) (2006)
- Darf man das (2006)
- Dingsda (Child's Play) (2001–2002)
- Geh aufs Ganze! (Let's Make a Deal) (1999–2003)
- Glücksrad (Wheel of Fortune) (1998–2002)
- Hugo (1994–1996)

=== RTL II ===
- Beat the Blondes (2011)
- Sing! Wenn du kannst (Sing If You Can) (2011)
- Die Wahrheit und nichts als die Wahrheit (Nothing but the Truth) (2008)
- 5 gegen 5 (Family Feud) (2006)
- Fame Academy Germany (2003–2004)
- Frauentausch (Wife Swap) (2003)
- Entern oder Kentern (Takeshi's Castle) (2002–2007)
- Deutschland klügste kinder (Britain's Brainiest Kid) (2001–2011)
- Survivor: Überwinde.Überliste.Überlebe! (Survivor) (2001)
- Popstars (2000–2001, 2015)
- Drück Dein Glück (Press Your Luck) (1999)

=== RTLplus ===
- Traumhochzeit
- Tutti Frutti (Colpo grosso)
- Der Preis ist heiß (The Price Is Right) (2017)
- Familien-Duell (Family Feud) (2016–2018)
- Glücksrad (Wheel of Fortune) (2016–2018)
- Jeopardy! (2016–2017)
- Ruck Zuck (Bruce Forsyth's Hot Streak) (2016–2017)
- Tic-Tac-Toe (Tic-Tac-Dough) (1992)
- Glück am Drücker (Press Your Luck) (1992)

=== Sky 1 ===
- MasterChef Germany (MasterChef) (2016)

=== Sport1 ===
- X Factor Germany (2010–2018)
- Hopp oder Top (Sale of the Century) (1993)

=== TLC ===
- RuPaul's Drag Race (2023)

== Greece ==
- Above or Below (Card Sharks)
- Agrótis mónos psáchnei (Farmer Wants a Wife)
- Andres etoimoi gia ola (Man O Man)
- I Ekdikisi tis Xanthias (Beat The Blondes)
- Big Brother
- Big in Japan (I Survived a Japanese Game Show)
- Boom! (Boom! (game show))
- The Boss has gone mad (Sale of the Century)
  - The Purchase of The Century
- Children Play (Child's Play)
- Dancing with the Stars
- Deal (Deal or No Deal)
- Distraction
- Divided (Divided (British game show))
- Eísai pio éxypnos apó éna dekáchrono (Are You Smarter than a 5th Grader?)
- Elláda écheis talénto (Got Talent)
- Fame Story
  - Star Academy
- Guess My Age (Rate Mal, Wie Alt Ich Bin)
- H timí timí den échei (The Price Is Right)
- House of Fame
- I Stigmi Tis Alithias (Nada más que la verdad / The Moment of Truth)
- I Téleia Apódrasi (Raid the Cage (American game show)
- Joker
- Kondres (Family Feud)
  - Kontra Plake
  - Akou Ti Eipan!
    - Akou Ti Eipan! Vradiatika
  - 5x5
- The List (The Rich List)
- MasterChef Greece
  - Junior MasterChef Greece
- Mega Banca (Bob's Full House)
- Mia trypa sto neró (Hole in the Wall)
- Millionaire Hot Seat (Greece) (Millionaire Hot Seat)
- Minute to Win It
- Money Drop (The Million Pound Drop)
- O Monomahos (1 vs. 100)
  - Fatous Olous
- O Pio Adynamos Krikos (The Weakest Link)
- O trochós tis tíchis (Wheel of Fortune)
- Oi 100 (The Hundred with Andy Lee)
- Pes ti Lexi
- Poios thélei na gínei Ekatommyrioúchos? (Who Wants to Be a Millionaire?)
- Power of 10
- Remote Control
- Quizdom the Show
- Rising Star
- Rosiki Rouleta (Russian Roulette)
- Rouk Zouk (Ruck Zuck / Bruce Forsyth's Hot Streak)
- Show Me the Money (Show Me the Money (American game show))
- So You Think You Can Dance
- Soúper Márket (Supermarket Sweep)
- Still Standing (Who's Still Standing? / La'uf al HaMillion)
- Survivor (Survivor (franchise))
- Switch
- Taftotita (Identity (game show))
- Ta Tetragona ton asteron (Hollywood Squares)
- Tha peís ki éna tragoúdi (The Singing Bee)
- The Chase (Greece) (The Chase (British game show))
- Top Chef
- The Voice of Greece
  - The Voice Kids
- Thysavrophylàkio (The Vault (game show))
- Vres ti Frasi (Catch Phrase)
- What About You? (Break the Bank)
  - Tilemplofes (Τηλεμπλόφες)
- Wipeout
- The Wall (The Wall (American game show))
- The X Factor
- Your Face Sounds Familiar

== Hong Kong ==
- 1 vs. 100 (ATV, 2006)
- Are You Smarter Than a 5th Grader? (TVB, 2008–2009)
- ATM (Action to Money) (now TV, 2011)
- ATM Plus (now TV, 2012)
- Brain Works (TVB, 2002–2003)
- Card Sharks (ATV, 1982)
- Deal or No Deal (TVB, 2006–2008)
- Everyone Wins (created by Robert Chua) (TVB, 2003)
- Identity (TVB, 2008)
- Justice for All (TVB, 2005–2006)
- Minutes to Fame (TVB, 2005–2007)
- Outsmart (TVB, 2009, 2012)
- The People Versus (ATV, 2002)
- Russian Roulette (TVB, 2002)
- Sale of the Century (ATV, 1982)
- Super Trio Show (TVB, 1995–2014)
- The Vault (ATV, 2002)
- The Weakest Link (TVB, 2001–2002)
- Who Wants to Be a Millionaire? (ATV, 2001–2005, 2014–)
- Who's Still Standing? (TVB, 2014–)

== Hungary ==
- 1 perc és nyersz! (Hungarian adaptation of Minute to Win It)
- A 40 milliós játszma (Hungarian adaptation of The Million Pound Drop)
- Activity
- Activity - A milliós küldetés
- Áll az alku (Hungarian adaptation of Deal or No Deal)
- Az igazság ára (Hungarian adaptation of The Prize of Truth)
- Az örökös
- Csaó, Darwin!
- Egy a száz ellen (Hungarian adaptation of 1 vs. 100)
- Játékidő
- Kapcsoltam
- A kód (Hungarian adaptation of The Exit List)
- A következő! (Hungarian adaptation of Avanti un altro!)
- Kvízió
- Legyen Ön is milliomos (Hungarian adaptation of Who Wants To Be A Millionaire?)
- A Leggyengebb Lanczem (Hungarian adaptation of Weakest Link)
- Maradj talpon! (Hungarian adaptation of Who's Still Standing?)
- Mindent vagy Semmit! (Hungarian combination of Jeopardy! and Sale of the Century)
- Multimilliomos (Hungarian adaptation of It's Your Chance of a Lifetime)
- Négyen négy ellen - A családi játszma or 4N4LN (Hungarian adaptation of Family Feud)
- Okosabb vagy, mint egy ötödikes? (Hungarian adaptation of Are You Smarter than a 5th Grader?)
- Párbaj (Hungarian adaptation of Duel)
- Pókerarc (Hungarian adaptation of PokerFace)
- Quizfire - Tűz, víz, kvíz! (Hungarian adaptation of Quizfire)
- A széf (Hungarian adaptation of Take It or Leave It)
- Szerencsekerék (Hungarian adaptation of Wheel of Fortune)
- Zsakbamacska (Hungarian adaptation of Let's Make a Deal)

== Iceland ==
- Ertu skarpari en skólakrakki?
- Gettu betur
- Meistarinn
- Útsvar

== India ==
- 10 Ka Dum (Power of 10)
- 100% De Dhana Dhan
- Aajaa Mahi Vay
- Aap Ki Kachehri
- Antakshari
- Antakshari – The Great Challenge
- Arre Deewano Mujhe Pehchano
- Athu Ithu Yethu
- Bachke Rehnaa Zara Sambhalna (Russian Roulette)
- Beauty and the Geek
- Bigg Boss (Big Brother)
- Biggest Loser Jeetega (The Biggest Loser)
- Bollywood Ka Boss
- Boogie Woogie
- Bournvita Quiz Contest
- Chala Change Ka Chakkar
- Chhote Ustaad
- Chota Packet Bada Dhamaka
- Comedy Circus
- Comedy Ka Maha Muqqabla
- Connexion
- Dancing Queen
- Deal Ya No Deal
- Deal or No Deal (Malayalam)
- Deal or No Deal (Tamil)
- Deal or No Deal (Telugu)
- Dance India Dance
- Dance Premier League
- Dil Jeetegi Desi Girl
- Entertainment Ke Liye Kuch Bhi Karega
- Fame X
- Funjabbi Chak De
- Ghazab Desh Ki Ajab Kahaaniyan
- The Great Indian Laughter Challenge
- India's Magic Star
- Jalwa Four 2 Ka 1
- Jeena Isi Ka Naam Hai
- Jeeto Chapad Paad Ke
- Jo Jeeta Wohi Super Star
- Just Dance
- Idea Zee Cinestars
- Indian Idol
- India's Best Cinestars Ki Khoj
- India's Got Talent
- Iss Jungle Se Mujhe Bachao
- It Happens Only In India
- Kaiyil Oru Kodi - Are You Ready? (Malayalam version of Million Dollar Drop)
- Kaiyil Oru Kodi - Are You Ready? (Tamil version of Million Dollar Drop)
- Kam Ya Zyaada
- Kamzor Kadi Kaun (The Weakest Link)
- Kaun Banega Crorepati (Who Wants to be a Millionaire?)
- Khullja Sim Sim (Let's Make A Deal)
- Kitchen Champion 4
- Kya Aap Paanchvi Pass Se Tez Hain? (Are You Smarter Than a 5th Grader?)
- Lead India
- Lift Kara De
- Mastercard Family Fortunes (Family Fortunes / Family Feud)
- MasterChef
- MTV Splitsvilla
- MTV Stuntmania
- Mummy Ke Superstars
- Music Ka Maha Muqqabla
- Nach Baliye
- Nachle Ve with Saroj Khan
- Naduvula konjam disturb pannuvom
- namma veetu mahalakshmi
- National Bingo Night
- Neengalum Vellalam Oru Kodi (Tamil version of Who Wants to be a Millionaire?)
- Neeya Nana
- Ningalkkum Aakaam Kodeeshwaran (Malayalam version of Who Wants to be a Millionaire?)
- Oru Varthai Oru Latcham
- Pati, Patni Aur Woh
- Perfect Bride
- Rakhi ka Insaaf
- Roadies
- Sa Re Ga Ma Pa
- Sa Re Ga Ma Pa
- Saap Seedhi
- Sajid's Superstars
- Sawaal Dus Crore Ka
- Shabaash India
- Sitaare Zameen Par
- Survivor India – The Ultimate Battle
- Swayamvar
- Thatt Antha Heli
- Thirukkural Payanam
- Tol Mol Ke Bol
- Voice of India
- Waar Parriwar
- Wife Bina Life
- X Factor India
- Yeh Shaam Mastani
- Zara Nachke Dikha
- Zor Ka Jhatka: Total Wipeout

== Indonesia ==
=== RCTI ===
- Who's on Top? (2017–2018)
- Siapa Lebih Berani (2009–2010)
- The Price Is Right Indonesia (The Price Is Right)
- Gong Show (The Gong Show) (2019–2020)
- Sasuke Ninja Warrior Indonesia
- X Factor Indonesia
- Iron Chef Indonesia (Iron Chef) (2017)
- Millionaire Hot Seat (Millionaire Hot Seat) (2010)
- Hole in the Wall (Brain Wall) (2007)
- Deal Or No Deal Indonesia (2007–2008)
- Fear Factor Indonesia (Fear Factor) (2005)
- Who Wants To Be A Millionaire? Indonesia (2001–2006)
- Tebak Gambar (Catchphrase) (2001–2003)
- Kata Berkait (Chain Reaction) (1995–2001)
- Piramida (Pyramid) (1995–2000)
- Piramida Baru (Pyramid) (2001–2003)
- Tak-Tik-BOOM (Tic-Tac-Dough) (1992–1998, 2010)

=== ANTV ===
- Super Family 100 (Family Feud) (2016)
- Super Deal (Let's Make a Deal) (2014–2015, 2016)
- Deal Or No Deal Indonesia (2011–2012)
- Katakan Katamu (All New Hot Streak) (2010–2011)
- Super Family (Family Feud) (2009–2011)
- Taxi Selebritis (Cash Cab) (2009)
- Super Deal (Let's Make a Deal) (2006–2007, 2010–2011)
- Super Milyarder 3 Milyar (Who Wants to Be a Millionaire?) (2006–2007)
- Super Rejeki 1 Milyar (Card Sharks) (2006–2007)
- Roda Impian (Wheel of Fortune) (2003–2005)
- Aksara Bermakna (Blockbusters) (1997–1998)
- Famili 100 (Family Feud) (1995–1998)
- Killer Karaoke (Sing If You Can) (2019)
- Geser Balok (Serlok) (as the part of Pesbukers segment) (Blockout) (2019–present)
- Siapa Paling Berani (2011)
- Satu Huruf Dong (2002–2003)

=== SCTV ===
- Chance of a Lifetime (It's Your Chance of a Lifetime) (2004)
- Roda Impian (Wheel of Fortune) (2001–2002)
- Detak-Detik (Every Second Counts) (1997–1999)
- Bulan Madu (The Newlywed Game) (1995)
- Serbuuu!
- Cepat Tepat Dapat (CTD) (2000–2001)
- Tantangan 1 Milyar (Lose A Million) (1997)
- Coba-Coba Kata (Cocok) (Lingo) (1996–1998)

=== Indosiar ===
- New Famili 100 (Family Feud) (2013–2015)
- 1 Lawan 100 (1 vs. 100) (2010–2011)
- The Price Is Right (2010–2011)
- Indonesia's Got Talent (2010)
- Take Me Out Indonesia (2009–2012)
- Happy Song (The Singing Bee) (2008)
- Roda Impian Pilih atau Dia (Wheel of Fortune) (2006)
- The Apprentice Indonesia (The Apprentice) (2005)
- Kuis Siapa Berani (2000–2005)
- Kuis Digital LG Prima (Digital LG Quiz) (2000–2004)
- Famili 100 (Family Feud) (1999–2004)
- Selebritis Indonesia (Hollywood Squares) (1999–2002)

=== GTV (Global TV) ===
- Family 100 Indonesia (Family Feud)
- Super Family 100 (Family Feud) (2021)
- Super Deal Indonesia (Let's Make a Deal)
- Match Game Indonesia (Match Game)
- Komunikata Indonesia (Bruce Forsyth's Hot Streak)
- Deal Or No Deal Indonesia (2014–2015)
- Are You Smarter than a 5th Grader? Indonesia (Are You Smarter than a 5th Grader?) (2009–2010)
- Hole in the Wall (Brain Wall) (2009)
- Password Jutawan (Million Dollar Password) (2008–2009)
- 30 Detik Menjadi Bintang (30 Seconds to Fame) (2005)
- Pimp My Ride Indonesia (Pimp My Ride) (2002–2014)
- Take It or Leave It (Himmel oder Hölle) (2021–present)

=== MNCTV (TPI) ===
- I Can See Your Voice
- Minute to Win It Indonesia (Minute to Win It)
- Benteng Takeshi Indonesia (Takeshi's Castle)
- Indonesian Idol Junior (2014–2017)
- Komunikata (Bruce Forsyth's Hot Streak) (2000–2005)

=== Trans7 ===
- Berpacu Dalam Melodi (Name That Tune)
- MeLirik Lagu (The Lyrics Board) (2004–2006)
- Famili 100 (Family Feud) (2004–2005)
- Hexagon War (2016–2017)

=== Trans TV ===
- Missing Lyrics (Don't Forget the Lyrics!)
- Russian Roulette (Russian Roulette) (2002–2003)
- Tebak Harga (The Price Is Right) (2001–2002, 2003–2005)
- Maju Terus Pantang Mundur
- Gong Show (The Gong Show) (2006–2012)

=== NET. ===
- Celebrity Squares (Hollywood Squares) (2015–2016)
- Berpacu Dalam Melodi (Name That Tune) (2014–2015)

=== TVRI ===
- Aksara Bermakna (Blockbusters) (1989–1996)
- Berpacu Dalam Melodi (Name That Tune) (1988–1998, 2013–2014)
- Kuis Siapa Berani (2018–2019)

=== Metro TV ===
- Supernanny
- Berpacu Dalam Melodi (Name That Tune) (2000–2005)
- Gladiator 1 Milyar

=== Kompas TV ===
- Temukan Kata (Now You See It) (2012–2013)
- Smart Face

=== tvOne (Lativi) ===
- Super Family 100 (Family Feud) (2017)

=== MTV Indonesia ===
- Pimp My Ride Indonesia (Pimp My Ride)

== Iran ==
- Mosabegheh Bozorg
- Mosabegheh Mahaleh
- Mosabegheh Telefoni

== Iraq ==
- Bank elma3lumat
- jawib wa4ba7
- M7ebis

== Ireland ==
- The Apprentice
- The Big Money Game
- Blackboard Jungle
- Bog Stop
- Cabin Fever
- Celebrity Farm
- Challenging Times
- Deal or No Deal
- Delegation
- Dodge the Question
- Don't Feed the Gondolas
- Dragons Den
- Fame and Fortune
- Family Fortunes
- Gridlock
- It's Not the Answer
- The Lyrics Board
- Telly Bingo
- Play the Game
- Quicksilver
- Talkabout
- Treasure Island
- The Trump Card
- The Weakest Link
- Who Wants to be a Millionaire?
- Winning Streak
- Winning Streak: Dream Ticket

== Israel ==
- 1 vs. 100
- Deal or No Deal
- Ha'Ahuzon Ha'Eliyon (The 1% Club)
- HaHulia HaHalasha (Weakest Link)
- HaKasefet (The Vault)
- Hamesh Hamesh (Ruck Zuck / Bruce Forsyth's Hot Streak)
- HaMirdaf (The Chase)
- HaMoach (The Brain)
- Lingo
- Melekh Ha Trivia (Jeopardy!)
- La'uf al HaMillion (the original version of Who's Still Standing?)
- Makbilit Ha Mohot (Mastermind)
- The Money Pump
- Monit HaKesef (Israeli version of Cash Cab)
- Pachot O Yoter (The Price Is Right)
- Raid the Cage
- Toto Mishpachty (Family Feud)
- Tots'ot Ha Emet (Power of 10)
- Galgal HaMazal (Wheel of Fortune)
- Who Wants to Be a Millionaire?

== Italy ==
- 1 contro 100 (Italian version of Eén tegen 100) (2007–2008)
- 3, 2, 1 Baila (2004)
- 6 del mestiere?! (1997)
- 50-50 (2008)
- 99 da battere (Italian version of 99 to Beat) (2025)
- 100 milioni + Iva (1997–1998)
- 100% (2001–2002)
- 100% Italia (2022–2024)
- 2008 (2001)
- A che gioco giochiamo? (1969)
- A gentile richiesta (2010)
- Adamo & Eva (2010)
- Gli affari sono affari (1983–1985)
- Affari Tuoi (Italian version of Deal or No Deal) (2003–2017, 2020–present)
- Allegria! (1999–2001)
- All Together Now - La musica è cambiata (2019–2021)
- Alta tensione - Il codice per vincere (2006, 2008)
- Anello Debole (Italian version of Weakest Link) (2001)
- Autostop (1984)
- Avanti un Altro! (2011–present)
- Avventura da paura! (2009–2010)
- Azzardo (2002–2003, 2007)
- Babilonia (Italian version of Hit Man) (1989–1990)
- Bellezze al bagno (1989–1993)
- Bellezze sulla neve (1991–1992)
- Bigodini - Il gioco che non fa una piega (2000)
- Bingooo (1978–1987)
- Bis (Reboot of Caccia al numero) (1981–1990)
- In bocca al lupo! (1998–2000)
- Boing Challenge (2020–2021)
- Boom! (2016–2019)
- Boomerissima (2023)
- La botola (2008)
- Il braccio e la mente (1957)
- Il braccio e la mente (2012)
- Bravo Bravissimo Club (2001–2002)
- Bring the Noise (2016–2017)
- Bubusette (2003–2004)
- Il buggzzum (1979–1981)
- Il buon paese (1985–1986)
- Buonasera con... (1977–1982)
- La bustarella (1978–1984)
- C'est la vie (Italian variant on Family Feud) (1985–1989)
- Caccia al numero (Italian version of Concentration) (1962)
- Caccia alla frase (Italian version of Catch Phrase) (1998)
- Caduta libera (Italian version of La'uf al HaMillion) (2015–2023, 2025–present)
- The Cage - Prendi e scappa (Italian version of Raid the Cage) (2025–2026)
- The Call - Chi ha paura di Teo Mammucari? (2010)
- Call Game (2001–2002)
- Camerino virtuale - The Box Game (2007–2008)
- Campanile sera (Predecessor to Jeux sans frontières) (1959–1962)
- Campionissimo (Italian version of Everybody's Equal) (1993)
- Canta e Vinci (Italian version of Don't Forget the Lyrics!) (2007–2008)
- Il cantante mascherato (Italian version of The Masked Singer) (2020–2023)
- Una canzone per 100.000 (2014–2015)
- Canzoni spericolate (1993–1994)
- Cari genitori (Italian version of The Family Game) (1988–1992)
- Caro bebè (1995)
- Carpool Karaoke (2017)
- Casa Castagna (1995–1996)
- Casa mia (1989–1990)
- Cash or Trash - Chi offre di più? (2021–present)
- Cash Taxi (Italian version of Cash Cab) (2009–2010, 2012–2013)
- Il castello (2002–2003)
- Celebrity Games (2012)
- Centoventitré (1998–1999)
- CentoxCento (2010)
- Che fine ha fatto Carmen Sandiego? (Italian version of Where in the World Is Carmen Sandiego?) (1993–1995)
- Che succ3de? (2020–2022)
- Chi fermerà la musica (Italian version of The Singing Bee) (2007–2008)
- Chi può batterci? (2024–2025)
- Chi ti conosce? (2018–2019)
- Chi ti ha dato la patente? (1967)
- Chi tiriamo in ballo? (1986–1988)
- Chi vuol essere milionario? (Italian version of Who Wants to Be a Millionaire?) (2000–2011, 2018–2020)
- Chi? (1976–1977)
- Chissà chi lo sa? (1961–1972)
- Ciao Darwin (1998–2000, 2003, 2007, 2010, 2016, 2019, 2023–2024)
- Ciao gente! (1983–1984)
- Cocco di mamma (1998)
- Colorado (1997–1998)
- Il colore dei soldi (2009)
- Colors (2016)
- Colpo d'occhio - L'apparenza inganna (Italian version of Odd One In) (2011)
- Un colpo di fortuna (1975–1976)
- Colpo grosso (1987–1992)
- Come quando fuori piove (1971–1972)
- Comedy Match (2024–present)
- Compagni di squola (2004)
- Complimenti per la trasmissione (1988)
- Conto alla rovescia (2019–2020)
- Conto su di te! (1988–1989)
- Cook40' (2022–2025)
- Cortesie per gli ospiti (2005–2012, 2018–present)
- Cortesie per l'auto (2020–present)
- Cos'è cos'è (1991)
- Crazy Cooking Show (2022)
- The Cube - La sfida (2011)
- Cupido (2009)
- D'amore e d'accordo (reboot of Tra moglie e marito) (2021)
- Deal With It - Stai al gioco (2019–2022)
- Il delitto è servito (Italian version of Cluedo) (1992–1993)
- Dimmi la verità (2008–2009)
- Il Dirodorlando (1974–1975)
- Disney Challenge Show - Me contro Te (2019)
- Distraction (2006–2007)
- Domani sposi (1988–1989)
- Don't Forget the Lyrics! - Stai sul pezzo (2022–2025)
- Doppio slalom (Italian version of Blockbusters) (1985–1990)
- Due passi in Italia (2011)
- Duecento al secondo (Italian version of Dollar a Second) (1955)
- Il duello (2004)
- È sempre mezzogiorno! (2020–present)
- L'eredità (Italian version of El legado) (2002–present)
- Eureka (2003)
- Eurogames (2019)
- Europa Europa (1988–1990)
- La fabbrica dei sogni (1987)
- Facce da quiz (2001)
- Facciamo un affare (Italian version of Let's Make a Deal) (1980, 1985–1986)
- Fake Show - Diffidate delle imitazioni (2023)
- Famiglie d'Italia (Italian version of Family Feud) (2024-2025)
- I Fantastici di Raffaella (1999)
- I fatti vostri (1990–present)
- Fattore C (2006)
- Fenomenal (2010–2011)
- Festa di classe (1999)
- La fiera dei sogni (1963–1966)
- Flash (1980–1982)
- The Floor - Ne rimarrà solo uno (2024, 2026–present)
- Formula segreta (2006)
- Forza papà (1998)
- Fratelli di Test (Italian version of Test the Nation) (2007, 2011)
- La freccia d'oro (1971)
- Freeze - Chi sta fermo vince! (2025)
- Furore (Italian version of La Fureur) (1997-2001, 2003, 2017)
- Game of Games - Gioco Loco (Italian version of Ellen's Game of Games) (2021)
- Game of Talents (2021)
- Genius (2001, 2003–2006)
- Giallo club - Invito al poliziesco (1959–1961)
- Giallo sera (1983–1984)
- Giass (2014)
- Giochi in famiglia (1966–1967)
- Il gioco dei 9 (Italian version of Hollywood Squares) (1988–1992, 2004)
- Il gioco dei giochi (1991)
- Il gioco dei mestieri (1972–1973, 1984–1985)
- Il gioco delle coppie (Italian version of The Dating Game) (1985–1992)
- Giorno dopo giorno (Italian version of Today's the Day) (2000–2002)
- Il gladiatore (2001)
- Gli affari sono affari (1983–1985)
- Gran Canal (1981)
- Gran Premio (1990)
- Il grande gioco del mercante in fiera (1996)
- Il grande gioco dell'oca (1993–1994)
- La grande sfida (1992–1994)
- Greed (2000-2001)
- Guess My Age - Indovina l'età (2017–2022)
- Help! (1983–1986)
- I Love Italy (2010–2011)
- L'imbroglione (Italian version of Dirty Rotten Cheater) (2004)
- In bocca al lupo! (1998–2000)
- Io e la Befana (1978–1979)
- L'isola degli eroi (2018)
- Italia's Got Talent (Italian version of Got Talent) (2009–present)
- Italiani (2001)
- Gli italiani hanno sempre ragione (Italian version of Don't Ask Me Ask Britain) (2015)
- Jackpot - Fate il vostro gioco (2008)
- Jump! Stasera mi tuffo (2013)
- Il labirinto (2001)
- Lascia o raddoppia? (Italian version of The $64,000 Question) (1955–1959)
- Liberi tutti! (2023)
- Lingo (1992–1993, 2021–2023)
- Lion Network (1994–2000)
- LOL - Chi ride è fuori (Italian version of Documental) (2021–present)
- Loretta Goggi in quiz (1983–1985)
- Il lotto alle otto (1998–2007, 2010)
- La luna nel pozzo (1984)
- Luna Park (1994–1997)
- M'ama non m'ama (Original version of Love Me, Love Me Not) (1983–1985; 1987–1988; 1994)
- Il malloppo (2005–2006)
- Mare contro mare (1965, 1988)
- Il mercante in fiera (2006, 2023)
- Mezzogiorno in famiglia (1993–2019)
- Mi gioco la nonna (2012)
- Mi presento ai tuoi (2023–2024)
- Il migliore (Italian version of Britain's Brainiest) (2006–2007)
- Il milionario (1987–1988)
- Un milione al secondo (1983–1984)
- Mille e una luce (1978)
- Un minuto per vincere (Italian version of Minute to Win It) (2011–2013)
- Mister - Il gioco dei nomi (2006)
- The Money Drop (Italian version of The Million Pound Drop) (2011–2013)
- MTV ChartBlast (2009)
- Music Quiz (Italian version of The Big Music Quiz) (2016–2017)
- Il Musichiere (Italian version of Name That Tune) (1957–1960)
- Naked Attraction Italia (Italian version of Naked Attraction) (2021–present)
- Name That Tune - Indovina la canzone (2020–2023)
- Il Napoleone (1979–1980)
- Nati per vincere (1995)
- NCC - Navigazione con conduttore (2020)
- Nella mia cucina (2019)
- Nientology (2010)
- Non dimenticate lo spazzolino da denti (Italian version of Don't Forget Your Toothbrush) (1995–1997)
- Non sparate sul pianista (2010, 2012)
- La notte del poker (2007)
- Novantatre (1992–1993)
- Numero Uno (1994–1996; 2002)
- Obbligo o verità (2025)
- Oblivious (2003)
- OK, il prezzo è giusto! (Italian version of The Price Is Right) (1983–2001)
- Ok, la casa è giusta! (2020–present)
- Parola mia (1985–1988; 2002–2003)
- Parole crociate (2011)
- Paroliamo (Italian version of Des chiffres et des lettres) (1977–1989)
- Partita doppia (1992–1993)
- La partita (1972)
- Passaparola (Italian version of The Alphabet Game) (1999–2008)
- Passiamo la notte insieme (1988)
- Pentatlon (1985–1987)
- Per la strada (1989)
- Per un pugno di libri (1998–2020)
- Perfetti innamorati (2011)
- Piacere Raiuno (1989–1992)
- Il Pomofiore (1975–1981)
- Porca miseria (1992–1993)
- Il pranzo è servito (1982–1993, 2021)
- Prendere o lasciare (2007)
- Primo e ultimo (2008)
- Il principe azzurro (1989)
- Producer - Il grande gioco del cinema (1995)
- Pronto Topolino? (1987)
- Pronto, chi gioca? (1985–1987)
- Pronto, è la Rai? (1987–1988)
- Pronto, Raffaella? (1983–1985)
- La prova del nove (1965–1966)
- Prova prova sa sa (Italian version of Whose Line Is It Anyway?) (2022–present)
- Pyramid (2007–2008)
- Quel motivetto... (1990)
- Questa è casa mia! (2022–present)
- Quiz Show (Italian version of It's Your Chance of a Lifetime) (2000–2002)
- Quiz sport (2007)
- Il Quizzone (1994–1998)
- Reazione a catena - L'intesa vincente (Italian version of Chain Reaction) (2007–present)
- Red or Black? - Tutto o niente (2013)
- Resta a casa e vinci (2019–2020)
- Ricette d'Italia - Piatti in tavola (2023–present)
- Rischiatutto (Italian version of Jeopardy!) (1970–1974, 2016, 2024)
- Rob-O-Cod (2019–2020)
- La ruota della fortuna (Italian version of Wheel of Fortune) (1987–2003, 2007–2009, 2024–present)
- Sala giochi (1995–1996)
- Salto nel buio (2001)
- Sarà vero? (1993–1994)
- Sarabanda (reboot of Il Musichiere) (1997-2005, 2009, 2017, 2025–present)
- Scacco al re (1972–1973)
- Scacco matto (1980–1981)
- Scanzonissima (Italian version of Killer Karaoke) (2018)
- Una scatola al giorno (2022)
- Scommettiamo che...? (Italian version of Wetten, dass..?) (1991–1996, 1999–2001, 2003, 2008)
- Scommettiamo? (1976–1978)
- Se io fossi... Sherlock Holmes (1994–1997)
- Secondo voi (1977–1978)
- Sei più bravo di un ragazzino di 5ª? (Italian version of Are You Smarter Than a 5th Grader?) (2008–2011)
- Il sesso forte (Italian version of The Better Sex) (1978)
- Sette e mezzo (1980)
- Sette per uno (1999–2001)
- Shopping Night (2011–2015, 2019)
- Showgirls (2005)
- Sì o no (1993-1994)
- Singing in the Car (Italian version of Carpool Karaoke) (2016–2017)
- Il sistemone (1981–1984)
- Social King (2011–2012)
- I sogni nel cassetto (1980–1981)
- Soliti ignoti (Italian version of Identity) (2007–2008, 2010–2012, 2017–2025)
- Sotto a chi tocca (1996–1997)
- Spaccaquindici (1975)
- La stangata (2009–2010)
- Stasera tutto è possibile (Italian version of Vendredi tout est permis avec Arthur) (2015–2016, 2018–2019, 2021–present)
- Su e giù (1968)
- Superboll (1998–1999)
- Superbrain - Le supermenti (Italian version of Deutschlands Superhirn) (2012–2013, 2018–2019)
- Superflash (1982–1985)
- Tanto vale (2015–2016)
- Telecruciverba (1964–1965)
- Telefonate al buio (2003)
- Il telegramma (1980–1983)
- Telemania (1996–1997)
- Telematch (1957–1958)
- Telemike (1987–1992)
- Teletris (Italian version of Tic-Tac-Dough) (1962–1964)
- Test - Gioco per conoscersi (1983–1984)
- Ti sembra normale? (2022–2023)
- Tilt - Tieni il tempo (2024)
- Tira & Molla (1996–1998)
- Tiramisù (1997)
- Top Dieci (2020–2021)
- Top One (2013–2014)
- Topolino show (1982–1983)
- Tra moglie e marito (Italian version of The Newlywed Game) (1987–1991)
- Il trappolone (1984)
- Trasformat (2010–2011)
- Le tre scimmiette (2005)
- Tris (1990–1991)
- Tris per vincere (Reboot of Il gioco dei 9) (2024)
- Tú sí que vales (2014–present)
- Tutti × uno (Italian version of Family Feud) (1992–1993)
- Tutti alla lavagna (2008)
- Tuttinfamiglia (Italian version of Family Feud) (1984–1989)
- Tutto per tutto (Original version of Show Me the Money) (2006)
- TV Mania (2010)
- Upgrade (2017–2019)
- Urka! (Italian version of Remote Control) (1991)
- Vale tutto (2007–2010)
- La verità (Italian version of To Tell the Truth) (1990–1995)
- Via Teulada 66 (1988–1989)
- Villaggio Party (1987–1988)
- Vinca il migliore (Revival of Campionissimo) (1996)
- La volta buona (2023–present)
- Vuoi scommettere? (Revival of Scommettiamo che...?) (2018)
- W le donne (1984–1986)
- The Wall (2017–2019, 2026)
- Wannadance? (2008–2011)
- Xtreme Kidz (2010)
- Zero e lode! (Italian version of Pointless) (2017–2018)
- Zig Zag (1983–1986)
- La zingara (Spin-off of Luna Park) (1995–2000, 2002)
- Zodiaco (1985)

== Japan ==
=== Fuji TV ===
- Vs. Arashi
- Game Center CX
- VivaVivaV6
- Magic Revolution
- Nep League
- Kuizu $ Mirionea クイズ$ミリオネア (Who Wants to Be a Millionaire?) (2000–2013)
- Nippon's Wipeout ワイプアウト日本 (Wipeout) (2013)
- 1分間チャレンジ 〜めざせ!100万ドル (Minute to Win It) (2013)
- Terrace House: Boys × Girls Next Door (2012–2014)
- Kyasshukyabu キャッシュキャブ (Cash Cab) (2008)
- Nōkabe 脳カベ (Brain Wall) (2006)
- Quiz! Hexagon II (2005–2011)
- Viking: The Ultimate Obstacle Course (2005–2007)
- IQ Sapuri 脳内エステ IQサプリ (2004–2009)
- Toribia no Izumi トリビアの泉 (2002–2006)
- Uikesutorinku hitori-gachi no hosoku ウィーケストリンク☆一人勝ちの法則 (The Weakest Link) (2002)
- Ainori (1999–2009)
- Ryōri no Tetsujin 料理の鉄人 (Iron Chef) (1993–2002)
- Ai ai gêmu アイ・アイゲーム (Match Game) (1979–1985)
- Quiz Grand Prix クイズグランプリ (Jeopardy!) (1970–1980)
- Quiz! Toshinosa nante クイズグランプリ (1970–1980)

=== TBS ===
- The Wall ウォールのライフ
- Sasuke サスケ
- Kunoichi クノイチ (broadcast in U.S. as Women of Ninja Warrior Woman)
- Athletic Fire 炎の体育会TV
- Door of Time 時の扉
- The Pyramid Derby ピラミッドダービー
- Against the Audience ブーイングスタジアム
- Baribari Value (MBS TV)
- Line Live Downtown ダウンタウンdxラインライブ
- All Star Thanksgiving Festival オールスター感謝祭 (Everybody's Equal)
- All Star After Party オールスター後夜祭 (Everybody's Equal) (2018)
- Real Escape Game TV リアル脱出ゲームTV (2013–2014)
- Battle of the Super Boyz 究極の男は誰だ!?最強スポーツ男子頂上決戦 (2012–2013)
- ¥20, 000, 000 Quiz! Money Drop 2000万円クイズ! マネードロップ (The Million Pound Drop) (2012)
- King of Chair キングオブチェアー (2010–2011)
- Monster Stairs モンスターステアーズ
- Lucked Out お笑い運試し
- テイク・ミー・アウト (Taken Out) (2009)
- Za Dīru ザ・ディール (Deal or No Deal) (2006–2007)
- The Chair ザ・チェアー (The Chair) (2005)
- Sabaibā サバイバ (Survivor) (2002–2003)
- Aim for the Bouquet ブーケをねらえ！ (2002–2003)
- Drunken Businessmen
- Super Human Coliseum
- Food Battle Club (2001–2002)
- Brain Survivor ブレイン･サバイバー (2000)
- Happy Family Plan しあわせ家族計画 (1997–2000)
- Get 100 100げっちゅ〜
- Street Fight ストリートファイト
- Kinniku Banzuke (1995–2002)
- Tokyo Friend Park 2 (1994–2011)
- Amazing Animals どうぶつ奇想天外! (1993–2009)
- Quiz! Atatte 25% (Everybody's Equal) (1991–1992)
- Fūun! Takeshi-jō 風雲！たけし城 (Takeshi's Castle) (1986–1990)
- Waku Waku Animal Land わくわく動物ランド (1983–1992)
- Quiz 100nin ni kikimashita (Family Feud) (1979–1992)
- Za cha-n-su ザ・チャンス！ (The Price Is Right) (1979–1986)
- Quiz Derby (Celebrity Sweepstakes) (1976–1992)
- 3 times 3 is quiz (Hollywood Squares) (1970–1971)

=== Nippon TV ===
- AKBingo!
- Downtown no Gaki no Tsukai ya Arahende!!
- Sekai No Hatte Madde Itte Q
- Burning Questions!
- Battle of the Homes
- Celebrity Style Battle
- Love Liar
- The Great Grandpa!
- Millionaire on a Roll - 24H Challenge
- Fools for Love
- Would You Pay?
- Happy House Cleaning
- Brain Athlete
- The Queen of Recipes
- Pharaoh!
- Perfect Balance!
- Human Arcade
- Key Master
- Psycho Battle
- SHOW os SHOWS - Your Choice, Your Show
- TRAIN OF THOUGHT
- TRUTH OR DOUBT
- EXIT!
- Takara-Sagashi Adventure Nazotoki Battle Tore! (2011–2013)
- Kuizu anata wa shogaku 5-nensei yori kashikoi no? (Are You Smarter than a 5th Grader?) (2011)
- Missitsu Nazotoki Variety Dasshutsu Game Dero! (2009–2011)
- Shall We Dance? (Strictly Come Dancing)
- Truth or Doubt (2004–2005)
- マネーの虎 (Dragons' Den) '(2001–2004)
- Let's Wakey Wakey
- Move This; It's Yours!
- Party of Six
- Quiz Stadium
- SAMURAI 5
- SHAMROCK
- GOCHI
- Who do YOU Choose?
- Magical Brain Power (brain-intensive game show)
- Susunu! Denpa Shonen (1998–2002)
- Ikkaku senkin! 一攫千金!!スーパーマーケット (Supermarket Sweep) (1991)
- Quiz sekaiha show by syoubai (1988–1996)
- Liar Quiz (Hollywood Squares) (1979–1980)
- Quiz Square (Hollywood Squares) (1980)

=== TV Asahi ===
- Panel Quiz Attack 25
- Cream Stew Quiz Miracle 9 (くりぃむクイズ ミラクル9)
- Time Shock
- Brainiest ブレイニスト (Britain's Brainiest Kid) (2012)
- Easy Peasy
- Challengers on Fire
- Noisy Neighbors
- Ranking the Stars
- 9 VS 9
- GO BABY GO
- Battle of the Budgets
- Car Puzzle
- Intimate Ties
- No Brainer
- The BLOCKS
- The FACTORY
- BAZOOKA
- Bounty Hunter
- Pressure Relay
- Pressure Study
- Quiz Hunter
- Treasure Hunting Elevator
- 10 Requirements to Marry a Millionaire
- A 12-Hour Game of Tag: A Test of Endurance
- Absolute Taste
- Domino Dare
- Fidelity Test
- Give Me a Clue
- Party Games
- Quiz 5 x 5
- Right Turn Only
- Shifty Eyes
- The Voice 日本 (The Voice) (2019)

=== TV Tokyo ===
- Terebi Champion TVチャンピオン (1992–2008)
- Asayan (1995–2002)

=== NHK ===
- Fukumen Research Boss Sennyū (Undercover Boss)
- Doctor G's Case File
- (Hold On To Your Seat)

=== Okinawa TV ===
- X Factor Okinawa Japan (The X Factor) (2013–2014)

== Korea, South ==
- 1 vs. 100
- The Golden Bell Challenge
- Goldfish (황금어장)
- Heroine Six
- Hidden Singer
- I Can See Your Voice
- Infinity Challenge
- Itta! Eoptta
- JangHak Quiz (since 1973, awarding scholarships to winning students)
- Let's Speak Korean: The Game
- Quiz Champions
- Quiz DaeHanMinGuk
- Ring The Golden Bell (for high school students)
- The Star Golden Bell Challenge
- Star King
- Super Viking
- Superkids
- The Genius: Rule Breaker
- Wits In Korean Language
- Ya Shim Man Man

== Lebanon ==
- Comikaze (on Lebanese Broadcasting Corporation)
- Truth X-Press (on SAT-7 ARABIC)
- Elhalka Eladaaf (2001–2003) (The Arabic version of The Weakest Link) on Future Television

== Macedonia ==
- 50/50 (2WayTraffic format)
- Кој сака да биде милионер? (Macedonian version of Who Wants to be a Millionaire?)
- Најслаба алкa (Macedonian version of The Weakest Link )
- Добра Шанса
- Земи или остави (Macedonian version of Deal or No Deal)
- Тркало на среќата (Macedonian version of Wheel of Fortune)
- Ба ба бум (2WayTraffic format)
- Бројки и букви

== Malta ==
=== ONE TV ===
- HazZzard (2006–2007, 2012–present)
- The Kilo Challenge (possibly a Maltese version of The Biggest loser) (2008–2009, 2011–present)
- Liquorish (2011–present)

=== TVM ===
- Deal or No Deal (2008–2010)
- Divided (2009–2010)
- Ħadd Għalik? (A Sunday For You?) (2008–present)
- Il-Kunjata (The Mother-in-law) (2010)
- Kwizzun (The Quiz) (2011–2013)
- L-Ispjun (The Spy Maltese version of Big Brother) (2007–2008)
- Liquorish (2006–2010)
- Puree (2011–2013)
- Studio 54 (2010–2011)

=== Net TV ===
- Kontra l-Ħin (Against The Time, possibly a Maltese version of Beat the Clock) (2006–2007, 2009–present)
- Puree (2009–2010, 2018–present)

== Malaysia ==
- Anda Ada 60 Saat (Malaysian version of Minute to Win It)
- Betul ke Bohong?
- Celebrity Squares (Malaysian version of Hollywood Squares) (defunct or not continued)
- Deal Or No Deal (With two versions in English and Chinese)
- Famili Ceria (Malaysian version of Family Feud) (defunct or not continued)
- Fear Factor Malaysia (Malaysian version of Fear Factor)
- Jangan Lupa Lirik! (Malaysian version of Don't Forget The Lyrics!)
- Rawana (Malaysian version of Tod Sa Gun Game)
- Roda Impian (Malaysian Version of Wheel Of Fortune)
- Serasi Bersama (Malaysian version of Mr. and Mrs.)
- The Weakest Link (Malaysian version of The Weakest Link) (to be announced)
- Who Wants to be a Millionaire? (with two versions in Malay and Chinese)

== Mexico ==
- 1 Minuto Para Ganar (Mexican version of One Minute to Win it)
- 100 Mexicanos Dijeron (Mexican version of Family Feud) (2001–2005, 2009–present)
- Atínale al precio (Mexican version of The Price Is Right) (1997–2001, 2010–present)
- ¡Buenas Tardes! (2006)
- Al Final Todo Queda en Familia (2018)
- Mi Pareja Puede (My husband do it) (2018)
- La Silla (2006)
- Corre GC corre
- Doble Cara (Mexican version of Poker Face)
- La Energía de Sonric'slandia (children's game show)
- Escape perfecto (Mexican version of Perfect Escape)
- Espacio en Blanco (Mexican version of Match Game) (2006)
- Factor Miedo (Mexican version of Fear Factor)
- En Familia con Chabelo
- Aguas con el Muro (Mexican version of Hole in the Wall)
- El Juego de la Oca
- ¡Boom!
- ¡Llévatelo! (Take It!) (1993–1995)
- No Pierdas El Billete (Mexican version of Don't Lose the Money)
- Password: La Palabra Secreta
- ¿Quien Tiene Estrella? (Mexican version of America's Got Talent)
- El Reto Burundis (Challenge of the Burundis)
- La Rueda De La Fortuna (Mexican version of Wheel of Fortune)
- Sexos en Guerra (Mexican version of La Guerra de los Sexos) (2003–2005)
- Todo o Nada(all or nothing)
- TVO (1991–1993)
- Vas O No Vas (Mexican version of Deal or No Deal) (2004–2006)
- Viva el Show
- El Juego de las Estrellas (Mexican version of The Stars Game Show)
- Recuerda y Gana (Remember to win)
- El Rival Más Débil (Mexican version of The Weakest Link)
- XE-TU
- XE-TU Remix
- Fantástico Amor

== Netherlands ==
- 1 tegen 100 (original format of 1 vs. 100)
- 1-2-3-Show
- 2 voor 12
- 5 Golden Rings
- 7 Plagen
- Achmea Kennisquiz J/M
- Adam Zkt. Eva
- AVRO's Wie-kent-kwis
- Boggle
- Bommetje!
- Doet-ie 't of doet-ie 't niet
- Eén van de acht (original format of The Generation Game)
- De Frank Kramer Show
- Het Moment Van De Waarheid (Nada más que la verdad)
- I Can See Your Voice
- Ik hou van Holland
- It's All in the Game
- De Jongens tegen de Meisjes
- De Knock-Out Show
- De Kwis
- De Lama's
- Lingo
- Lotto Weekend Miljonairs (Who Wants to Be a Millionaire?)
- Lucky Letters
- Mike and Thomas Show
- Postcode Loterij Miljoenenjacht (original format of Deal or No Deal)
- Minute to Win It
- Peking Express
- Per Seconde Wijzer
- Postcode Loterij Recordshow
- Succes verzekerd
- Te land, ter zee en in de lucht
- Vijf tegen Vijf (Family Feud)
- VriendenLoterij Miljonairs (Who Wants to Be a Millionaire?)
- Wie ben ik?
- Wie is de Mol? (Dutch TV series)
- De Zeven Zeeën
- De Zwakste Schakel (Weakest Link)

== New Zealand ==
- Are You Smarter Than A 10 Year Old? (NZ version of Are You Smarter Than A 5th Grader?)
- Cash Battle (New Zealand version of Polish Awantura o kasę)
- Deal or No Deal
- The Great New Zealand Spelling Bee
- It's Academic
- It's in the Bag
- Have You Been Paying Attention?
- The Weakest Link
- Top Town
- University Challenge
- W3
- Wheel of Fortune
- Who Wants to Be a Millionaire?

== Norway ==
- Deal or No Deal
- Det svakeste ledd ( The Norwegian version of The Weakest Link )
- Kvitt eller dubbelt
- Norske Talenter
- Vil du bli millionær? (Who Wants to Be a Millionaire?)

== Pakistan ==
- Bazm E Tariq Aziz
- BOL Champions
- Croron Mein Khel
- Challenger
- Foodistan
- Game Show Aisay Chalay Ga
- Geo Khelo Pakistan
- Inaam Ghar
- Inaam Ghar Plus
- Jeet Ka Dum
- Jeeto Pakistan
- Jeeto Pakistan League
- Jeeway Pakistan
- Kya Aap Banaingay Crorepati?
- Khush Raho Pakistan
- Looto Game
- Living on the Edge
- Malamal Express
- Madventures
- Pakistan Idol
- Pepsi Battle of the Bands
- Survivor Pakistan
- The Weakest Link ( The Pakistani version of The Weakest Link )

== Panama ==
- 100 Panameños Dicen (Panamanian version of Family Feud)
- Bailando por un Sueño
- El Bille Show
- El Familion
- LG Quiz
- Tu dia de suerte
- Vive la Musica

== Philippines ==
=== ABS-CBN ===
- 1 vs. 100
- Bet on Your Baby
- Celebrity Playtime
- Everybody Sing
- Family Feud
- Game ng Bayan
- Games Uplate Live
- I Can See Your Voice
- It's Showtime
- Kapamilya, Deal or No Deal
- Little Big Star
- Little Big Superstar
- Minute to Win it
- Pilipinas, Game KNB?
- Pilipinas Got Talent
- Pinoy Big Brother
- Pinoy Bingo Night
- Pinoy Fear Factor
- The Price Is Right
- Rainbow Rumble
- The Singing Bee
- Star in a Million
- Star Power
- Wheel of Fortune
- Wowowee
- The X Factor Philippines

=== GMA ===
- All-Star K! The 1 Million Peso Videoke Challenge
- All-Star Videoke
- Asar Talo Lahat Panalo!
- BandaOke: Rock n' Roll to Millions
- Celebrity Bluff
- Digital LG Quiz
- Don't Lose the Money
- Eat Bulaga!
- Family Feud
- GoBingo
- Kakasa Ka Ba Sa Grade 5?
- Nuts Entertainment
- People vs. the Stars
- Picture! Picture!
- Pinoy Big Brother
- Power of 10
- Ready, Text, Go!
- Student Canteen
- The Wall Philippines
- Tok! Tok! Tok! Isang Milyon Pasok!
- Wachamakulit
- Whammy! Push Your Luck
- Wowowin

=== PTV ===
- PCSO Lottery Draw
- Play n' Win

=== TV5 ===
- 1000 Heartbeats Pintig Pinoy
- Bawal Na Game Show
- Easy Money: Ang Cash Ng Bayan
- Eat Bulaga!
- Family Feud
- Fill In The Bank
- Go For It!
- Let's Ask Pilipinas
- The Million Peso Money Drop
- The Price Is Right
- Puso O Pera
- Rolling In It Philippines
- The Wall Philippines
- The Weakest Link
- Wheel of Fortune
- Who Wants to Be a Millionaire?
- Wil Time Bigtime
- Wil To Win
- Win Win Win
- Wowowillie

=== Q (Quality Television) ===
- Now Na!

=== IBC ===
- Islands Game Masters
- The Weakest Link
- Who Wants to Be a Millionaire?

=== RPN ===
- Battle of the Brains
- Family Kwarta o Kahon
- Spin-A-Win
- Super Suerte sa 9

=== UNTV ===
- Bihasa: Biblya Hamon Sa'yo
- Campus Challenge

=== Studio 23 ===
- Kabarkada, Break the Bank

=== Net 25 ===
- Tara Game, Agad Agad

=== A2Z ===
- Rainbow Rumble

== Poland ==
The list does not include talent shows, reality shows (apart from a few reality game shows), nor celebrity-orientated game shows / entertainment programmes based upon game shows.

=== Broadcast during Fall 2025 season ===
- TVP1:
  - Jaka to melodia? (Name That Tune)
  - Gra słów. Krzyżówka (Wordplay – original format)
- TVP2:
  - Jeden z dziesięciu (Fifteen to One)
  - Familiada (Family Feud)
  - Kocham Cię, Polsko! (I Love My Country)
  - Koło fortuny (Wheel of Fortune)
  - Omnibus – szybcy i mądrzy (De Slimste Mens ter Wereld)
  - Postaw na milion (The Money Drop)
  - Tak to leciało! (Don't Forget the Lyrics!)
  - Va banque (Jeopardy!)
- Polsat:
  - Awantura o kasę (Cash Battle – original format)
  - Ninja Warrior Polska / Ninja vs Ninja (Ninja Warrior / Sasuke)
  - Milionerzy (Who Wants to Be a Millionaire?)
- TVN:
  - The Floor (The Floor)
- TTV:
  - Idź na całość (Let’s Make a Deal)

Season break:

- 99 – gra o wszystko / 99 – gra o wszystko. VIP (99 to Beat) – TTV

=== Major former formats ===
Not all game shows are included.

TVP1

- 300 procent normy (original format)
- Big Music Quiz (The Big Music Quiz)
- Dwadzieścia jeden (Twenty-One)
- Gotowi na ślub (Love Letters)
- Kochamy polskie seriale (original format)
- Kochamy polskie komedie (original format)
- Mecz – teleturniej piłkarski (original format)
- Miliard w rozumie (original format)
- Nowożeńcy (The Newlywed Game; later on TV Puls as Tylko Ty)
- Podróż życia (Life’s Greatest Journey – original format)
- Rodzina jak z nut (Familie at Strike)
- Rodzina wie lepiej (Sure or Insure)
- The Wall. Wygraj marzenia (The Wall; last five episodes on TVP2)
- To był rok! (A Year to Remember)
- Wiesz czy nie wiesz? (Who Knew?)

TVP2

- 5 × 5 – wygrajmy razem (Lingo; later on TV4 as Lingo)
- Cudowne lata (Boomerissima)
- Czar par (original format)
- Dubidu (Doobidoo)
- Duety do mety (The Mad Dash)
- Dzieciaki górą! (The Kids Are All Right)
- Fort Boyard (Fort Boyard; later on Viaplay as Fort Boyard Polska)
- Gilotyna (The Guillotine / The Legacy)
- Kabaretożercy (original format)
- Kocham Dwójkę. Złoty jubileusz (original format)
- Krzyżówka szczęścia (original format)
- Krzyżówka 13-latków (original format)
- Krzyżówka 13-latków, czyli Światowid (original format)
- Magia liter (original format)
- Moja klasa – Back to School (original format)
- Najlepszy z najlepszych (The Best of the Best – original format)
- Oto jest pytanie (That’s the Question)
- Przyjaciele na zawsze (original format)
- Szalone liczby (Crazy Numbers – original format)
- Śpiewające fortepiany (The Lyrics Board)
- Tele Milenium (original format)
- Tylko Ty! (Pointless)
- Wielka gra (The $64,000 Question)
- Wielka draka o dzieciaka (That’s My Kid)
- Wielki Poker (PokerFace)
- Znaki Zodiaku (In the Stars – original format)

Polsat

- Chciwość, czyli żądza pieniądza (Greed)
- Dziewięciu wspaniałych (Hollywood Squares)
- Eureko, ja to wiem! (Ahmea Kennisquiz)
- Fear Factor – Nieustraszeni (Fear Factor)
- Gra w ciemno (Clueless – original format)
- Grasz czy nie grasz (Deal or No Deal)
- Idź na całość (Let’s Make a Deal)
- Kalambury / Kalambury z gwiazdami (original format)
- Mistrz zakupów (original format)
- Moment prawdy (The Moment of Truth)
- Piramida (Pyramid)
- Rekiny kart (Card Sharks)
- Rosyjska ruletka (Russian Roulette)
- Rozbij bank (?)
- Sekrety Rodzinne (Family Secrets)
- Strzał w 10 (Power of 10)
- Życiowa szansa (Chance of a Lifetime)

TV4

- Daję słowo (Páli vám to?)
- Gdzie jest Kłamczuch? (Dirty Rotten Cheater)
- Hole in the Wall (Hole in the Wall)
- Istne szaleństwo (original format)
- Przetrwanie (Perseverance)

TVN

- Chwila prawdy (Happy Family Plan)
- Ciao Darwin (Ciao Darwin)
- Clever – widzisz i wiesz (Clever – die Show, die Wissen schafft)
- Dobra cena (The Price Is Right)
- Dzieciaki z klasą (Britain's Brainiest — Britain's Brainiest Kid)
- Hipnoza (You’re Back in the Room)
- Kto to wie? (Let’s Ask America)
- Milion w minutę (Minute to Win it)
- Najsłabsze ogniwo (The Weakest Link)
- O co chodzi? (Catchphrase)
- Oko za oko (Dog Eat Dog)
- We dwoje (original format)
- Wipeout – Wymiatacze (Wipeout)

TV Puls

- Bankomat. Wyścig z czasem (The ATM)
- Czy jesteś mądrzejszy od 5-klasisty? (Are you Smarter than a 5th Grader?)
- Następny proszę! (Next One!)
- Gra muzyka (original format)
- Singa Dinga (Sing-A-Song)

TVP Historia

- Giganci historii (Connoisseurs of History – original format)

Super Polsat

- Joker (Joker)
- Łowcy nagród (Raid the Cage)
- Taxi kasa (Cash Cab; formerly on TV4 as Taxi)

Online platforms

- Music Lotek (original format)
- Profesor sportu (original format)
- Programista 100K (original format)

== Portugal ==
- A Amiga Olga (Portuguese version of Take Your Pick!, 1993–1994 - Olga Cardoso)
- Agarra a Música (2017 - Cláudia Vieira and João Paulo Rodrigues)
- Agora É que Conta (2010–2011)
- Apanha se Puderes (Portuguese version of Raid the Cage, 2017–2019)
- As Receitas Lá de Casa (2018–2020 - José Carlos Malato)
- Brainstorm (2017–2018 - Pedro Fernandes)
- Caça ao Tesouro (Portuguese version of Treasure Hunt, 1994–1995)
- Chamar a música (Portuguese version of The Singing Bee, 2008–present - Herman José)
- Com a Verdade M' Enganas (1994–1995 - Herman José)
- Congela (2024–present - Pedro Teixeira)
- Dança Comigo (Portuguese version of Dancing with the Stars, 2006–2008 - Catarina Furtado, Sílvia Alberto)
- Decisão Final (Portuguese version of Russian Roulette, 2012–2013 - José Carlos Malato)
- Desprevenidos (2006 - Alexandre Ovídio)
- Écran Mágico (1979–1980 - Rui Mendes)
- O Elo Mais Fraco (Portuguese version of Weakest Link, 2002–2004, 2011–2012 - Júlia Pinheiro, Luísa Castel-Branco, Pedro Granger)
- Estrelas ao Sábado (2023–present - Isabel Silva)
- Em Família (Portuguese version of Family Feud, 2006 - Fernando Mendes)
- Fear Factor - Desafio Total (Portuguese version of Fear Factor, 2003–2004 - José Carlos Araújo, Leonor Poeiras)
- Ganha num Minuto (Portuguese version of Minute to Win It, 2012–2013 - Marco Horácio)
- O Grande Poeta é o Povo (1967–1968)
- Jogo Duplo (Portuguese version of PokerFace, 2008–2010)
- Lingo (2006–2007)
- Mental Samurai (2019–2021 - Pedro Teixeira)
- O Momento da Verdade (Portuguese version of Nada mas que la verdad, 2008 - Teresa Guilherme)
- The Money Drop (2015–2016 - Teresa Guilherme)
- Pegar ou Largar (Portuguese version of Deal or No Deal)
- O Preço Certo (Portuguese version of The Price Is Right, 1990–present)
- Prémio de Sonho (Portuguese version of Win Your Wish List, 2019- Cristina Ferreira)
- Quando o Telefone Toca (Portuguese version of Quizmania, 2007–2008 - Vanessa Palma, Patrícia Henrique, Quimbé)
- Quem Quer Ganha (Portuguese version of Puzzeltijd)
- Quem quer ser milionário? (Portuguese version of Who Wants To Be A Millionaire, 2000–2015)
  - Quem Quer Ser Milionário? - Alta Pressão (Portuguese version of Millionaire Hot Seat, 2010–2020)
- Quem Sabe, Sabe (1958–1961)
- Roda dos Milhões (1998–2001)
- A Roda da Sorte (Portuguese version of Wheel of Fortune, 1990–2008)
- Sabe Mais do que um Miúdo de Dez Anos (Portuguese version of Are You Smarter Than a 5th Grader?, - 2007–2008 - Jorge Gabriel)
- Sabe ou Não Sabe (2013–2016 - Vasco Palmeirim)
- Salve-se Quem Puder (Portuguese version of Brain Wall, 2009–present)
- SAPO Challenge
- Sempre a Somar
- Shark Tank (2015–2016)
- Taskmaster (2022)
- Um Contra Todos (Portuguese version of 1 vs. 100, 2004 - José Carlos Malato)
- Vale Tudo (Portuguese version of Vendredi tout est permis avec Arthur, 2013–present - João Manzarra)
- Veja Se Adivinha (1957–1958 - Artur Agostinho)
- Ver p'ra Crer (2019–2020 - Pedro Fernandes)
- A Visita da Cornélia (1977 - Raul Solnado)

== Puerto Rico ==
- Control Remoto (Puerto Rican version of MTV's Remote Control)
- Sabado en Grande
- Super Sabado
- A Millón
- A Toda Maquina

== Russia ==
- 12 Negrityat
- Alfavit
- Allo, TV!
- Dom
- Golod
- Klub Byvshikh Zhen
- Koleso Istorii
- Lzhec
- Nastoyaschij Muzhchina
- Papa, Mama, Ya
- Sem' Pod Solncem
- Shestoye Chuvstvo
- Stavka
- V Temnote
- Vozmozhnosti Plasticheskoj Khirurgii
- Vremya - Den'gi!
- Za Sem'yu Pechatyami

=== Russia 1 ===
- Sto k Odnomu (Family Feud)
- Narodniy Artist (Idol)
- Стена (The Wall) (2017)
- Glavnaya Stsena (The X Factor) (2015)
- Odin v odin! (Your Face Sounds Familiar) (2014–2016)
- Kletka (Raid the Cage) (2014)
- Артист (Artist) (Rising Star) (2014)
- Pursuit (The Chase) (2012–2013)
- Minutnoe Delo (Minute to Win It) (2012)
- Битва хopов (Clash of the Choirs) (2012)
- Faktor A (The X Factor) (2011–2013)
- Shou Desyat' Millionov (The Million Pound Drop) (2010–2014)
- 50 Blondinok (Beat the Blondes) (2008)
- Tantsy So Zvyozdami (Dancing with the Stars) (2005–2016)
- Sekret Uspekha (The X Factor) (2005–2007)
- Piramida (Pyramid) (2004–2005)
- Форт Боярд (Fort Boyard) (2002–2004)
- Dva Royalya (The Lyrics Board) (1998–2003, 2010–2011)
- Proshche Prostogo (Hollywood Squares) (1996–1997)

=== Channel One ===
- Голос (The Voice)
- Голос. Дети (The Voice Kids)
- Голос. 60+ (The Voice Senior)
- Kto khochet stat' millionerom? (Who Wants to Be a Millionaire?)
- Pole Chudes (Wheel of Fortune)
- Chto? Gde? Kogda? (What? Where? When?)
- Ugadai Melodiyu (Name That Tune)
- Stenka na Stenku (Brain Wall)
- Minuta Slavy (Got Talent)
- Pobedytel' (The Winner Is) (2017)
- Русский ниндзя (Ninja Warrior) (2017)
- Форт Боярд (Fort Boyard) (2014)
- Toch-v-Toch (Your Face Sounds Familiar) (2014)
- Odin v odin! (Your Face Sounds Familiar) (2013)
- Vyshka (Celebrity Splash!) (2013)
- Kub (The Cube) (2013)
- Detektor Lji (Nada más que la verdad) (2010)
- Zhestokiye Igry (Wipeout) (2010)
- Magiya Desyati (Power of 10) (2008)
- Mozhesh? Spoy! (The Singing Bee) (2008)
- Tsirk so Zvezdami (Celebrity Circus) (2007)
- Lednikovniy Period (Dancing on Ice) (2006–2016)
- Pan ili Propal (Deal or No Deal) (2004–2005)
- Fabrika Zvyozd (Star Academy) (2002–2011)
- Russkaya Ruletka (Russian Roulette) (2002–2004)
- Posledniy Geroy (Survivor) (2001–2005, 2008–2009)
- Slaboe Zveno (The Weakest Link) (2001–2005)
- Poymy Menya (Bruce Forsyth's Hot Streak) (1995–1996)
- Narod Protiv (The People Versus)

=== NTV ===
- Svoya Igra (Jeopardy!)
- Трудно быть боссом (Undercover Boss)
- Ustami Mladenca (Child's Play)
- Iz Pesni Slov Ne Vykinesh (Don't Forget the Lyrics!) (2013)
- Tsena Udachi (The Price Is Right) (2005–2006)
- Faktor Strakha (Fear Factor) (2002–2005)
- Alchnost (Greed) (2001–2002)
- О, счастливчик! (Who Wants to Be a Millionaire?) (1999–2001)
- Chto? Gde? Kogda? (What? Where? When?) (1999–2000)
- Форт Боярд (Fort Boyard) (1998)
- Proshche Prostogo (Hollywood Squares) (1997)
- Poymy Menya (Bruce Forsyth's Hot Streak) (1995–1996)
- Lyubov' s Pervogo Vzglyada (The Dating Game)

=== Channel 5 ===
- Slaboye Zveno (The Weakest Link) (2007–2008)

=== REN TV ===
- Takeshi Kitano's Castle (Takeshi's Castle)
- Адская Кухня (Hell's Kitchen) (2012–2013)
- Суперняня (Supernanny) (2008)
- Sdelka (Deal or No Deal) (2006)
- Zvanyy Uzhin (Come Dine with Me) (2006)
- Krasavitsy i Umniki (Beauty and the Geek) (2005)
- Ostrov Iskushenij (Temptation Island) (2005)

=== TNT ===
- Где логика?
- Holostyak (The Bachelor) (2013)
- Kto ne chočet stat millionerom? (Unan1mous) (2008)
- Intuyitsiya (Identity) (2007–2013)
- Kandidat (The Apprentice) (2005–2007)
- Bolshoy Brat (Big Brother) (2005)
- Taxi (Cash Cab) (2005)

=== CTC ===
- Vzveshenniye lyudi (The Biggest Loser)
- Moy Papa Kruche! (My Dad Is Better Than Your Dad) (2016)
- МастерШеф (MasterChef) (2013–2014)
- Детские шалости (Child's Play) (2008–2009)
- Kto umnee 5-klassnika? (Are You Smarter than a 5th Grader?) (2007–2008)
- Zvonok (The Phone) (2007)
- Ty - supermodel (Top Model) (2004–2007)
- Sami‘y Umni‘y (Britain's Brainiest Kid) (2003–2012)
- Kreslo (The Chair) (2002–2004)

=== TV3 ===
- Semyeinyi Prigovor (The Marriage Ref) (2011)

=== TV Center ===
- Odin Protiv Vseh (1 vs. 100) (2007–2009)
- Dva Royalya (The Lyrics Board) (2004–2005)
- Sto k Odnomu (Family Feud) (1997–1998)

=== 2x2 ===
- Японские забавы (Takeshi's Castle) (2011–2012, 2013–2014)

=== Russia-K ===
- Genij (Mastermind)

=== Pyatnica! ===
- Экс на пляже (Ex on the Beach) (2017)
- Iz Pesni Slov Ne Vykinesh (Don't Forget the Lyrics!) (2013)
- Пой (если сможешь) (Sing If You Can) (2013)

=== Muz-TV ===
- Novaya Fabrika Zvyozd (Star Academy) (2017)
- Top Model po-russki (Top Model) (2011–2012)

=== Karusel ===
- Poymy Menya (Kids edition) (Bruce Forsyth's Hot Streak)

=== U ===
- Караоке Киллер (Sing If You Can) (2013)
- Top Model po-russki (Top Model) (2012–2014)

=== Disney ===
- Ustami Mladenca (Child's Play) (2013–2014)

=== MTV Russia ===
- Проект Подиум - Project Runway Russia (Project Runway) (2011–2012)

=== TV6 (defunct) ===
- Obratnyy Otschot (The Vault) (2001)

== Serbia ==
- Da li ste pametniji od Đaka Petaka? (Serbian version of Are You Smarter Than a 5th Grader??)
- Keš Taksi (Serbian version of Cash Cab)
- Kviskoteka
- Najslabija Karika (Serbian version of Weakest Link)
- Put Oko Sveta
- TV Slagalica
- Uzmi ili Ostavi (Serbian version of Deal or No Deal)
- Veliki Brat (Serbian/Montenegrin/Bosnian/Macedonian version of Big Brother)
- Visoki Napon
- Želite li da postanete milioner? (Serbian version of Who Wants to Be a Millionaire?)
- Potera (Serbian version of The Chase)
- Igraj za zavičaj

== Slovakia ==
- 5 proti 5 (Slovak version of Family Feud)
- Milionár (Slovak version of Who Wants to Be a Millionaire?)
- Taxík (Slovak original version of Cash Cab)
- IQ Taxi (Slovak version of Cash Cab)
- Riskni milión (Slovak version of Holland Succes verzekerd)
- Pokušenie (Slovak original version of Jeopardy!)
- Riskuj! (Slovak version of Jeopardy!)
- Koleso šťastia (Slovak version of Wheel of Fortune)
- Ruku na to (Slovak original version of Deal or No Deal)
- Veľký balík (Slovak version of Deal or No Deal)
- Páli vám to? (Slovak version of Czech Pálí vám to?)
- Inkognito (Slovak version of What's My Line?)

== Slovenia ==
- Hipnoza: Dobra zabava (Slovenian version of You're Back in the Room)
- Kdo bi vedel (Slovenian version of Who Knew)
- Bitka parov (Slovenian version of Power Couple)
- Taksi, kviz z Jožetom (Slovenian version of Cash Cab)
- Vem! (Slovenian version of Slam)
- Vse je mogoće (Slovenian version of Riot)
- Denar pada (Slovenian version of The Million Pound Drop Live)
- Moj dragi zmore (Slovenian version of Mein Man kann)
- Moja Slovenija (Slovenian version of I Love My Country)
- Minuta do zmage (Slovenian version of Minute to Win It)
- Trenutek resnice (Slovenian version of The Moment of Truth)
- Vse ali nič (Slovenian version of Divided)
- Družinski dvoboj / Kdo bo koga (Slovenian version of Family Feud)
- Vzemi ali pusti (Slovenian version of Deal or No Deal)
- Najšibkejši člen (Slovenian version of Weakest Link)
- Lepo je biti milionar / Milionar z Jonasom (Slovenian version of Who Wants to Be a Millionaire?)
- 1, 2, 3... kdo dobi?! (original format)
- POP kviz (original format)
- Kolo sreče (Slovenian version of Wheel of Fortune)

== South Africa ==
- Are You Smarter than a 5th Grader?
- Deal or No Deal
- Noot vir Noot (South Africa's longest running game show and named as one of the top 10 in the world)
- Telefun Quiz
- Walk the Plank
- The Weakest Link
- Who Wants to Be a Millionaire?
- A Word or 2 (South African version of Countdown)
- Zama-Zama (1999 SABC 1 game show)

== Spain ==
- ¡Ahora caigo! (Spanish version of Who's Still Standing?; 2011–2021)
- ¡Allá tú! (Spanish version of Deal or No Deal; 2004–present)
- ¡Salta! (Spanish version of The Jump; 2025)
- ¿Juegas o qué? (Spanish version of Ready or Not; 2019)
- ¿Y tú qué sabes? (2015–2016)
- 3×4 (1988–1990)
- 20p (2009)
- 25 palabras (Spanish version of 25 Words or Less; 2022–2023)
- ¡A bailar! (2014)
- ¡A cantar! (2020)
- A la caza del tesoro (Spanish version of Treasure Hunt; 1984)
- A tu bola (Spanish version of Marble Mania; 2023)
- A tu vera (2009–present)
- AcapelA (2016)
- Adivina qué hago esta noche (Game of Talents; 2019–2024)
- Adivine su vida (Spanish version of What's My Line?; 1960–1961)
- Agárrate al sillón (Spanish version of Tout le monde veut prendre sa place; 2025–2026)
- Al pie de la letra (Spanish version of The Singing Bee; 2007–2009)
- Alta Tensión (Spanish version of Wipeout; 1998–2025)
- Ankawa (2005–2006)
- Atrápame si puedes
- Avanti, ¡que pase el siguiente! (Spanish version of Avanti un altro!; 2012)
- ¡Ay, qué calor! (Spanish version of Colpo grosso; 1990–1991)
- Ayer noticia, hoy dinero (1961–1962)
- Baila como puedas (2024)
- Bailando con las estrellas (Spanish version of Dancing with the Stars; 2018–present)
- La batalla de las estrellas (1993–1994)
- Bellezas al agua (1990–1993)
- Bellezas en la nieve (1992)
- Benidorm Fest (2022–present)
- Bienvenidos a mi hotel (Spanish version of Four in a Bed; 2018–2019)
- Bloqueados por el muro (2020)
- Bocamoll (2007–2011)
- ¡Boom! (2014–2024)
- El bribón (2019–2020)
- Cambie su suerte (1974)
- Carrusel (1960)
- El cazador (Spanish version of The Chase; 2020–2026)
- Cero en Historia (2017–2021)
- Cesta y puntos (1966–1971)
- Cifras y letras (Spanish version of Des chiffres et des lettres; 1991–1996; 1998–2000; 2002–2013; 2024–present)
- El círculo de los famosos (Spanish version of The Wheel; 2023)
- ¡Clever! (2007)
- El club de Flo (2006–2007)
- Código emprende (2013)
- Coma un allo (2017–)
- ¿Conocemos España? (1978)
- Contacto con tacto (1992–1994)
- Crush (2018)
- Cuando calienta el Sol (1995)
- Cuatro Weddings (Spanish version of Four Weddings; 2018–2019)
- Dale al REC (2011–2012)
- Dame una pista (Spanish version of Give Us a Clue; 2010–2011)
- Date el bote (2001–2009)
- De 500 a 500.000 (1962–1963)
- Decision Final (Spanish version of Russian Roulette; 2004)
- El desafío (2021–present)
- Destino Argentina (1978)
- Destino Plutón (1980)
- Ding-Dong (1980)
- Doraemon Land (2014)
- El 1% (Spanish version of The 1% Club; 2024–present)
- El comodín de La 1 (Spanish version of Joker; 2022–2023)
- El concurso del año (Spanish version of Guess My Age; 2018–2021)
- El gran dictat (2009–2017)
- El juego del euromillón (1998–2001, 2009)
- El puente de las mentiras (Spanish version of Bridge of Lies; 2023)
- El tirón (2019–2020)
- Entre platos anda el juego (Spanish version of Il pranzo è servito; 1990–1993)
- Esos locos bajitos (1998-1999, 2005)
- Esta noche gano yo (2022)
- Estoy por ti (2005–2006)
- EuroGames (2020)
- Expedición imposible (Spanish version of Expedition Impossible (2013)
- Family Feud: La batalla de los famosos (Spanish version of Celebrity Family Feud; 2021)
- Festival de la Canción Infantil de TVE (1967-1970, 1973, 1979)
- Fifty Fifty (2008)
- The Floor (2023–present)
- Furor (Spanish version of La Fureur; 1998-2001, 2006)
- Gane su viaje (1961–1962)
- Genio y figura (1994–1995)
- Gol... y al Mundial-82 (1981–1982)
- El gordo (1990–1992)
- El gran juego de la oca (The Big Goose Game; 1993–1995, 1998)
- El Grand Prix del verano (Spanish version of Intervilles; 1995–present)
- El gran reto musical (Spanish version of The Big Music Quiz; 2017)
- Gran Slam (Spanish version of Grand Slam; 2007)
- Grand Prix Xpress (2010–2011)
- Guaypaut (Spanish version of Wipeout; 2008–10)
- Guerra de sesos (2009–2010)
- Hasta el fin del mundo (Spanish version of Race Across the World; 2025–present)
- Identity (2007–2008)
- Invictus, ¿te atreves? (2024)
- Involución (2011)
- Juego de cartas (2017–present)
- Juego de juegos (Spanish version of Ellen's Game of Games; 2019)
- El juego de los anillos (Spanish version of 5 Gold Rings; 2019–2020)
- Juego de niños (Spanish version of Child's Play; 1988–1992, 2019)
- Juego de pelotas (Spanish version of The Quiz with Balls; 2025–present)
- El juego de tu vida (Spain's version of Nada más que la verdad; 2008–2010)
- Juegos en familia (Spanish version of Family Game Night; 2011–2013)
- La biblioteka (Spanish version of Silent Library; 2008–2010)
- La conexión (2025)
- La huida (Spanish version of Hunted; 2016)
- La mejor canción jamás cantada (2019)
- Lápiz y papel (1981–1982)
- LEGO Masters España (2021)
- Leo contra todos (1984)
- Lingo (1993–1996, 2002–2004, 2005–2007, 2021–2022)
- La lista (Spanish version of The Rich List; 2008–2010)
- La llamada de la suerte (1998)
- Lo sabe, no lo sabe (2012–2013, 2024–present)
- Luna de miel (1992–1994)
- Maestros de la costura Celebrity (2025–present)
- Mapi (2022)
- Mask Singer: Adivina quién canta (2020–present)
- MasterChef (2013–present)
- Me lo dices o me lo cantas (2017)
- La merienda (1990–1994)
- Metro a metro (2004–2008, 2012)
- Un millón para el mejor (1968–1969)
- El millonario (Spanish version of Millionaire Hot Seat; 2012)
- ¡Mira quién baila! (Spanish version of Strictly Come Dancing; 2005–2009, 2014, 2024)
- ¡Mira quién salta! (Spanish version of Celebrity Splash!; 2013–2014)
- Misión Eurovisión (2007)
- Mójate (2011)
- Money time (2013)
- Money, money (Spanish version of Show Me the Money; 2007–2008)
- El monstruo de Sanchezstein (1977–1978)
- Mucho que perder, poco que ganar (Spanish version of Chris Moyles' Quiz Night; 2011)
- Negocia como puedas (2013)
- Next Level Chef (2025)
- Ninja Warrior (2017–2018)
- No sabe, no contesta (2006)
- No te rías, que es peor (1990–1995)
- La noche de los castillos (1995–1996)
- Números locos (Spanish version of Attention à la marche !; 2005)
- Números Rojos (Red Numbers; 2005)
- Olé tus vídeos (1991–1993)
- Operación Tony Manero (2008)
- Palabra por palabra (2005–2011)
- Pánico en el plató (2009–2010)
- La parodia nacional (1996–1999, 2001)
- Pasapalabra (Spanish version of The Alphabet Game; 2000–present)
- Password (Spanish version of Million Dollar Password; 2008–2010)
- Password (Spanish version of Password; 2023)
- Pekín Express (2008–present)
- Peque Prix (1998–2000)
- Pequeños gigantes (2014–2015)
- Por arte de magia (2013)
- El Precio Justo (Spanish version of The Price Is Right; 1988–1993, 1996–1997, 1999–2002, 2006–2007, 2021)
- Preguntas al espacio (1958)
- El Puente (The Bridge; 2017–2018)
- Un pueblo para Europa (1970)
- Qarenta (2020)
- ¿Qué apostamos? (Spanish version of Wetten, dass..?; 1993–2000, 2008)
- ¿Quién dice la verdad? (Spanish version of To Tell the Truth; 1965–1966)
- ¿Quién quiere ser millonario? (Spanish version of Who Wants to Be a Millionaire?; 1999–2025)
- La guillotina (Spanish versio of L'eredità; 2010)
- La quinta esfera (Spanish version of El Legado; 2003)
- Reacción en cadena (Spanish version of Chain Reaction; 2022–2025)
- El Rescate Del Talismán (Spanish version of Knightmare; 1991–1994)
- El rival más débil (Spanish version of The Weakest Link; 2002–2004, 2024)
- Rueda la letra (2026)
- La ruleta de la fortuna (Spanish version of Wheel of Fortune; 1990–1997, 2006–)
- Saber y ganar (1997–present)
- ¿Sabes más que un niño de primaria? (Spanish version of Are You Smarter Than a 5th Grader?; 2007–2008)
- Los sabios (1984–1986)
- Salta a la vista (Spanish version of Odd One In; 2011–2012)
- Salvemos Eurovisión (2008)
- Los Segundos Cuentan (Spanish version of Every Second Counts; 1990–1991)
- El semáforo (1995–1997)
- Si lo sé no vengo (1985–1988)
- Sí o no (1961–1963)
- Silencio se juega (1984)
- Sin vergüenza (1992–1993)
- Smonka! (2005–2007)
- Soy el que más sabe de televisión del mundo (2005–2006)
- Su media naranja (Spanish version of The Newlywed Game; 1990–1996)
- Supermarket (Spanish version of Supermarket Sweep; 1992)
- Taxi (Spanish version of Cash Cab; 2006–2013)
- Te falta un viaje (2023–)
- Te ha tocado (Spanish version of Chacun son tour; 2022)
- Te lo Mereces (Spanish version of You Deserve It; 2012)
- Tele-club (1964–1966)
- Telecupón (1990–2005)
- The Floor (2023–present)
- The Wall: Cambia tu vida (2017)
- El tiempo es oro (1987–1992)
- Tírame de la lengua (1997)
- Todo el mundo es bueno (Spanish version of Don't Stop Me Now; 2012)
- Todo queda en casa (Spanish version of Family Feud; 1986-1987, 1994-1995, 2001, 2021)
- Todos contra 1 (2023)
- Toma cero y a jugar... (2009–2010)
- Top Chef (2013–2017)
- El traidor (Spanish version of The Mole; 2006)
- Tres en Raya (Spanish version of Hollywood Squares)
- Trivial Pursuit (2011, 2026)
- Tu cara me suena (Your Face Sounds Familiar; 2011–present)
- Tu oportunidad (Spanish version of Dragons' Den; 2013)
- El turista habitual (1993)
- Typical Spanish (2020)
- Un, dos, tres... responda otra vez (1972–1973, 1976–1978, 1982–1988, 1991–1994, 2004)
- La unión hace la fuerza (Spanish version of La Tête et les Jambes; 1964–1966)
- Uno para ganar (Spanish version of Minute to Win It; 2011–2012)
- Uno para todas (Spanish version of Man O Man; 1995–1996)
- Vaya crack (Spanish version of Canada's Smartest Person; 2019)
- Ven a cenar conmigo (Spanish version of Come Dine with Me; 2017–2020)
- Veo cómo cantas (Spanish version of I Can See Your Voice; 2021–2022)
- Verdad o mentira (1982–1983)
- Vídeos de primera (Spanish version of America's Funniest Home Videos; 1990–1998)
- Vídeos, Vídeos (1994, 2001–2002)
- VIP (Spanish version of Hollywood Squares; 1990–1992)
- Vivan los novios (Spanish version of The Dating Game; 1991–1994)
- Waku Waku
- X cuánto? (2003)
- XO da dinero (Spanish version of Tic Tac Dough; 1959–1960)
- Xuxa Park (1992)
- XXS (2011)

== Sri Lanka ==
- Gando Nogando
- Punchi Pahe Mang

== Thailand ==
- Ching Roi Ching Lan (ชิงร้อยชิงล้าน) (1990–2023)
  - Ching Roi Ching Lan (first version) (1990–1993)
  - Ching Roi Ching Lan Top Secret (1993–1994)
  - Ching Roi Ching Lan ONCE (1994–1995)
  - Ching Roi Ching Lan Super Game (1996–1998)
  - Ching Roi Ching Lan Cha Cha Cha (1998–2008, 2009–2011)
  - Ching Roi Ching Lan 20th Century Tuck (2008–2009)
  - Ching Roi Ching Lan Sunshine Day (2012–2015)
  - Ching Roi Ching Lan Wow Wow Wow (2015–2023)
- Deal or No Deal เอาหรือไม่เอา (Deal or No Deal Thailand) (2005)
- 4 ต่อ 4 แฟมิลี่เกม (Family Feud Thailand) (2001–2006, 2016–2025)
  - 4 ต่อ 4 เซเลบริตี้ (Family Feud Thailand (Celebrities)) (2020–2025)
- Game Zone (Magical Brain Power Thailand) (1996–2002)
- Iron Chef Thailand (2012–July 11, 2026, September 26, 2026–present)
  - Iron Chef Thailand Versus Asia (2025–present)
- The Weakest Link กำจัดจุดอ่อน (The Weakest Link Thailand) (2002)
- เกมเศรษฐี (Who Wants to Be a Millionaire? Thailand) (2000–2008, 2019–2020)
- 1 vs 100 Thailand (2008)
- ถ้าคุณแน่? อย่าแพ้เด็ก(ประถม)! (Are You Smarter Than A 5th Grader? Thailand) (2007–2009)
- Fan Pan Tae (แฟนพันธุ์แท้) (2000–2008, 2012–2017, 2018)
- Lightning Quiz (ปริศนาฟ้าแลบ) (2014–2019)
- Still Standing Thailand (2015–2019)
- The Money Drop Thailand (2014–2018)

== Turkey ==
=== ATV ===
- Kim Milyoner Olmak Ister (Who Wants to Be a Millionaire?)
- Piramit (Pyramid)
- En Zayıf Halka (Turkish version of The Weakest Link) (2019)
- Kapanmadan Kazan (Raid the Cage) (2013)
- Güven bana (Trust) (2012)
- Sen Hak Ediyorsun (You Deserve It) (2011)
- Kelimenin Gücü (Million Dollar Password) (2010–2011)
- Dans Eder misin? Yaz Ateşi (So You Think You Can Dance) (2007–2011)
- Ünlüler Çiftliği (The Farm) (2004)
- Akademi Türkiye (Star Academy) (2004)
- Kaç Para? (The Price Is Right) (2003–2004, 2011)
- Trilyon Avi (Deal or No Deal) (2003–2004)
- Aslan Payi (Greed) (2000)
- Seç Bakalim (Let's Make a Deal) (1995–1998)
- Aşağı Yukarı (Card Sharks) (1994–1997)
- XOX: Kare Akademisi (Hollywood Squares) (1993–1996)

=== FOX ===
- Sıradaki Gelsin (Avanti un altro!)
- Fear Factor Aksiyon (Fear Factor) (2013)
- Var misin? Yok musun? (Deal or No Deal) (2011–2012)
- Bir Milyon Canli Para (The Million Pound Drop) (2012)
- 101 (101 Ways to Leave a Gameshow) (2010)
- Mehmet Ali Erbil'le 50 Sarisin (Beat the Blondes) (2009)
- Kandiramazsin Beni (Hollywood Squares) (2009)
- Fort Boyard (Fort Boyard) (2008–2009)
- Dans Eder misin? (So You Think You Can Dance) (2006)

=== Kanal D ===
- Çarkifelek (Wheel of Fortune)
- Koltuk (The Chair) (2002)
- Takip (The Chase) (2014–2015)
- Bir Milyon Canli Para (The Million Pound Drop) (2014)
- X Factor: Star Işığı (2014)
- Kazanmak için 1 Dakika (Minute to Win It) (2012)
- Kup (The Cube) (2010)
- Süpermarket (Supermarket Sweep) (2009)
- Aşkın Gözü Kördür (Dating in the Dark) (2009)
- Dans Eder misin? (So You Think You Can Dance) (2005)
- Büyük Teklif (Deal or No Deal) (2006)
- Yarisma Maratonu (Gameshow Marathon) (2006)
- Çırak (The Apprentice) (2005)
- Her Şey Yolunda (The Simple Life) (2004)
- Kim 500 Milyar Ister? (Who Wants to Be a Millionaire?) (2000–2004)
- Ya Sandadir Ya Bunda (Match Game) (1999)
- Bir Sarki Söyle (Name That Tune) (1998–1999)
- Aileler Yarisiyor (Family Feud) (1998)
- Yüzyilin Indirimi (Sale of the Century) (1995–1997)
- Şansini Dene (Press Your Luck) (1994–1996)

=== Star TV ===
- Büyük Risk (Jeopardy!)
- Kimsin Sen? (Identity)
- Big Brother Türkiye (2015–2016)
- Ve Kazanan (The Winner Is) (2015)
- Vay Arkadas (L'eredità) (2014–2015)
- O Ses Çocuklar (The Voice Kids) (2014)
- Benzemez Kimse Sana (Your Face Sounds Familiar) (2012, 2015)
- O Ses Türkiye (The Voice) (2012–2014)
- Eyvah Düsüyorum (Who's Still Standing?) (2012–2013, 2014)
- Yetenek Sizsiniz Türkiye! (Got Talent) (2012–2013)
- Yeni Bir Hayat (The Biggest Loser) (2012)
- Star Akademi (Star Academy) (2011)
- Fear Factor Extreme (Fear Factor) (2009–2010)
- 5'e Gidenden Akilli Misin? (Are You Smarter than a 5th Grader?) (2007)
- Bak Su Duvara (Brain Wall) (2009)
- Kim Bir Milyon Ister? (Who Wants to Be a Millionaire?) (2008–2009)
- Rus Ruleti (Russian Roulette) (2008)
- Proje Moda (Project Runway) (2007)
- Ünlüler Sirki (Celebrity Circus) (2007)
- Top Model Türkiye (Top Model) (2006)
- Passaparola (The Alphabet Game) (2005–2010)
- Hazine Adasi (Fort Boyard) (2000)
- Yüzyilin Indirimi (Sale of the Century) (1998)

=== Show TV ===
- Var misin? Yok musun? (Deal or No Deal) (2007–2010, 2013–2014)
- Bir milyon kimin (The People's Quiz) (2013)
- Ben Burdan Atlarım (Celebrity Splash!) (2013)
- Benzemez Kimse Sana (Your Face Sounds Familiar) (2013)
- O Ses Türkiye (The Voice) (2011–2012)
- Bir Milyon Canli Para (The Million Pound Drop) (2010–2011)
- Yok Böyle Dans (Dancing with the Stars) (2010–2011)
- MasterChef Türkiye (MasterChef) (2010)
- Yetenek Sizsiniz Türkiye! (Got Talent) (2009–2011)
- Korolar Çarpışıyor (Clash of the Choirs) (2009)
- Wipeout (Wipeout) (2008)
- Huysuz'la Dans Eder misin? (So You Think You Can Dance) (2007–2011)
- Şarkı Söylemek Lazım (Just the Two of Us) (2007–2008)
- Buzda Dans (Dancing on Ice) (2007)
- Güzel ve Dahi (Beauty and the Geek) (2007)
- Fear Factor Türkiye (Fear Factor) (2006)
- Kim 500 Bin Ister? (Who Wants to Be a Millionaire?) (2005–2007)
- Gelinim Olur musun (Momma's Boys) (2004)
- Türkstar (Idol) (2004)
- En zayif halka (The Weakest Link) (2001–2002)
- Kim 500 Milyar Ister? (Who Wants to Be a Millionaire?) (2000–2004)
- Süper Aile (Family Feud) (1992–1994)
- XOX: Kare Akademisi (Hollywood Squares) (1993–1996)
- Saklambaç (The Dating Game) (1992–1996)
- Haydi Bastır (Blockbusters) (1992–1993)
- (The Singing Bee)

=== TRT 1 ===
- Bir Kelime, Bir İşlem (Countdown)
- Aileler Yarişiyor (Family Feud) (2013–2014)
- Bilir Bilmez (Going for Gold) (1996)
- Riziko! (Jeopardy!) (1994–1996)
- Türkiye Yarışıyor (The People Versus) (2003–2004)

=== TV8 ===
- O Ses Türkiye (The Voice)
- O Ses Çocuklar (The Voice Kids)
- Yetenek Sizsiniz Türkiye! (Got Talent)
- Survivor: Ünlüler vs. Gönüllüler (Survivor)
- Rising Star Türkiye (Rising Star) (2015–2016)
- En zayif halka (The Weakest Link) (2015)
- Ninja Warrior Türkiye (Ninja Warrior) (2014)
- Ver Fırına (The Great British Bake Off) (2014)
- Aileler Yarisiyor (Family Feud) (2014)
- Yemekteyiz (Come Dine with Me) (2009)

=== Kanal 7 ===
- Riziko! (Jeopardy!) (1994–2001)

=== TRT Çocuk ===
- Bilen Parmak Kaldırsın (Britain's Brainiest Kid) (2009)

=== NTV ===
- Mastermind Türkiye (Mastermind) (2013)

=== TNT (defunct) ===
- Aklın Yolu Bir (What? Where? When?) (2011)

=== Turkmax (defunct) ===
- Anlaşma (Divided) (2010)

=== Kanal 1 (defunct) ===
- Süper Aile (2008)
- Star Akademi Türkiye (Star Academy) (2008)
- Passaparola (The Alphabet Game) (2006–2008)

=== Kanal 6 (defunct) ===
- Süpermarket (Supermarket Sweep) (1994)
- Seç Bakalım (Let's Make a Deal) (1992–1995)
- Parola (Password) (1992–1997)

=== Samanyoulu TV (defunct) ===
- Kelime Zinciri (Chain Reaction) (2012)

=== Cine5 (defunct) ===
- 1'e Karşı 100 (1 vs. 100) (2007)

== Ukraine ==
- Chervone abo chorne? (Ukrainian version of Red or Black?)
- Chy rozumnishyy ti za p'yatyklasnyka? (Ukrainian version of Are You Smarter than a 5th Grader?)
- Detektor brekhni (Ukrainian version of Nada mas que la verdad)
- Hrayesh chy ne hrayesh? (Ukrainian version of Deal or No Deal)
- Intuitsiya (Ukrainian version of Identity)
- Khto proty blondynok? (Ukrainian version of Beat the Blondes)
- Khto khoche staty milyonerom? (second Ukrainian version of Who Wants to Be a Millionaire?)
- Kub (Ukrainian version of The Cube)
- Milyoner - Garyache Krislo (Ukrainian version of Millionaire Hot Seat)
- Pershiy Milion (Ukrainian version of Who Wants to Be a Millionaire?)
- Prosto Shou (Ukrainian version of Family Feud)
- Shou Na Dva Milyoni (Ukrainian version of The Million Pound Drop Live)
- Shou Shara (Ukrainian version of Supermarket Sweep)
- Tilki pravda? (Ukrainian version of Nada mas que la verdad)

== Uruguay ==
- A todo o nada (Uruguayan version of the exact same format of the same name; 2023-present)
- Ahora caigo! (Uruguayan version of La'uf al HaMillion; 2022–present)
- El último pasajero (Uruguayan version of the exact same format of the same name; 2022)
- Escape perfecto (Uruguayan version of Raid the Cage; 2014–2020)
- La ruleta de la suerte (Uruguayan version Wheel of Fortune; 2020–2022)
- Los 8 escalones (Uruguayan version of the format of the same name; 2021–2022)
- Pasapalabra (Uruguayan version of The Alphabet Game; 2019–2024)
- Poné Play (Uruguayan version of the French show Le Grand Blind test; 2020–2024)
- Salven el millón (Uruguayan version of The Million Pound Drop; 2012–2017)
- Sopa de letras (Uruguayan version the Israeli show The Search; 2021–2022)
- Todos contra mí (2018–2019)
- Trato hecho (Uruguayan version Deal or No Deal; 2019–2024)
- 100 uruguayos dicen (Uruguayan version of Family Feud; 2021–present)
- ¿Quién quiere ser millonario? (Uruguayan version of Who Wants to Be a Millionaire?; 2001; 2021–2022)

== Venezuela ==
- Contra reloj (2001–2002; Pyramid)
- El Gran Navegante (2007–2008)
- Guerra De Los Sexos (2000–2006)
- Match 4 (1980s; Pyramid)
- Mega Match (1996–2007)
- El Poder de Ganar (2008; Power of 10)
- ¿Qué dice la gente? (Family Feud)
- ¿Quién quiere ser millonario? (Venezuela version of Who Wants to Be a Millionaire? (2000–2017)

== Vietnam ==
=== VTV ===
- 1 không 2 (The Only)
- 5 vòng vàng kỳ ảo (5 Gold Rings)
- 72 giờ thách thức sức bền
- 7 nốt nhạc xanh (2024)
- 100 giây rực rỡ - All Together Now
- Ai là ai (Who Is Who) (2006–2007)
- Ai là bậc thầy chính hiệu (Who Is The Real Celebrity?)
- Ai là triệu phú (Who Wants to Be a Millionaire?) (2005-2010, 2011-now)
- Ai là triệu phú - Ghế nóng (Millionaire Hot Seat, 2010 - 2011)
- Ai thông minh hơn học sinh lớp 5? (Are You Smarter Than a 5th Grader?) (2012 – 2014)
- Ai tỏa sáng (2016)
- Ảo thuật siêu phàm – Amazing Magicians (2018)
- Ánh sáng hay Bóng tối (Heaven Or Hell) (2017)
- Alo English (VTV7)
- Bài hát đầu tiên (2020-now)
- Bài hát hay nhất (Sing My Song)
- Bật mí bí mật
- Bản lĩnh nhóc tỳ
- Ban nhạc Việt - The Band
- Bạn có bình thường (Are You Normal) (2015–2016?)
- Bàn thắng Vàng – Golden Goal
- Biệt đội vui nhộn (G-Wars)
- Bộ 3 siêu đẳng
- Bố ơi! Mình đi đâu thế? - Dad! Where Are We Going? (2014–2018)
- Bố ơi mẹ thích gì
- Biệt tài tí hon – Little But Special
- Bước nhảy hoàn vũ (Dancing with the Stars - VIP Dance) (2010–2016, 2023)
- Bước nhảy ngàn cân – Dance Your Fat Off
- Ca sĩ ẩn danh - Shadows Singer
- Ca sĩ tranh tài (Singer Take It All)
- Cash Cab - Xe kỳ thú (VTV8, 2021-now)
- Cặp đôi hoàn hảo (Just the Two of Us) (2012)
- Cầu thủ tí hon - Shootdori (2011–2015)
- Cầu thủ nhí (upgraded version of Cầu thủ tí hon, 2018-now, formerly broadcast on HTV7)
- Cháu ơi cháu à (Generation Gap) (2017)
- Chân ái (2020)
- Chắp cánh thương hiệu (2007–2011)
- Chết cười - Anything Goes (2015)
- Chìa khóa thành công (2007–2009)
- Chìa khóa vàng (BrainTeaser) (2007–2010)
- Chiếc nón kỳ diệu (Wheel of Fortune) (2001–2016)
- Chinh phục (Britain's Brainiest Kid)
- Chinh phục tương lai (VTV7)
- Chọn đâu cho đúng (Crush) (2020)
- Chọn ngay đi (The Best of All) (2020)
- Chuẩn cơm mẹ nấu (My Mom Cooks Better Than Yours) (2015-now)
- Chúng ta là 1 gia đình
- Chúng tôi là chiến sĩ (2006–2019)
- Chúng tôi - Chiến sĩ (formerly Chiến sĩ 2020, upgraded version of Chúng tôi là chiến sĩ)
- Chuyến xe buýt kỳ thú (mixed of Challenge! The Golden Bell and Cash Cab but not part of these franchises)
- Chữ V diệu kỳ
- Con biết tuốt (Out of Control) (2016–2017)
- Con số vui nhộn (Attention à la marche) (2007–2009)
- Cơ hội cho ai - Whose Chance (2019-now)
- Cố lên con yêu (Bet On Your Baby) (2016–2018)
- Crack'em Up (VTV7, not to be confused with HTV7 gameshow Thách thức danh hài, which was the Vietnamese version of Crack Them Up)
- Cùng hát lên nào (Sing On!)
- Cuộc đua kỳ thú (The Amazing Race)
- Đường lên đỉnh Olympia (Digital LG Quiz) (1999-now)
- Đấu trường 100 (1 vs. 100) (2006–2015)
- Đấu trí (PokerFace) (2007–2008)
- Đấu trường thông thái (2025-now)
- Đại chiến âm nhạc
- Đại náo thành Takeshi (Takeshi's Castle) (2017)
- Đại náo thư viện chiến (Silent Library) (2019)
- Đố ai hát được (Sing If You Can) (2013)
- Đối mặt (La Cible) (2007–2010)
- Đoán tuổi như ý - Guess My Age (2019)
- Đừng để tiền rơi (The Million Pound Drop) (2014–2017)
- Gà đẻ trứng vàng (2019–2020)
- Giác quan thứ 6
- Giai điệu chung đôi
- Giai điệu bí ẩn - Karaoke Showdown (VTV9)
- Giọng hát Việt (The Voice - The Voice Kids) (2012–2021)
- Giờ thứ 9
- Giờ thứ 9+ (upgraded version of Giờ thứ 9, season 2 was similar to The Price Is Right but not a part of the franchise)
- Gương mặt thân quen (Your Face Sounds Familiar) (2013–now)
- Hà Nội 36 phố phường (2009–2010)
- Hành khách cuối cùng (The Last Passenger - O Último Passageiro) (2007–2009)
- Hành lý tình yêu (Baggage) (2020-now)
- Hành trình văn hóa (2001–2007)
- Hãy chọn giá đúng (The Price Is Right) (2004-2020)
- Hãy xem tôi diễn
- Hãy yêu nhau đi
- Hẹn ngay đi (The Choice)
- Hóa đơn may mắn
- Hoán đổi - Switched
- Hợp ca tranh tài (Clash Of The Choirs) (2012)
- Kèo này ai thắng (2020)
- Khám phá chữ Việt (BrainTeaser) (2008–2010)
- Khắc nhập khắc xuất (Show Me the Money) (2008–2010)
- Không giới hạn - Sasuke Việt Nam (Sasuke / Ninja Warrior) (2015–2019, 2026-present)
- Không thỏa hiệp (Divided) (2019)
- Ký ức vui vẻ (De Generatie Show) (2018–now)
- Lạ lắm à nha - The Wall Song
- Lá xanh (2025-now)
- Lựa chọn của trái tim - Sexy Boats
- Làm giàu không khó (VTV1)
- Mặt trời bé con (Little Big Shots) (2017)
- Mẹ tuyệt vời nhất
- Một bước để chiến thắng (Step Right Up) (2013–2014)
- Một trăm triệu một phút (Million Dollar Minute) (2015–now)
- Nhà thiết kế tương lai nhí
- Nhà mình quá đỉnh (mixed of Family Feud and Double Dare but not a part of the franchise)
- Nhập gia tùy tục
- Ngôi sao Việt - VK Pop Super Star (2013)
- Ngôi sao thiết kế Việt Nam
- Người đi xuyên tường (Hole in the wall - Brain Wall)
- Người đứng thẳng
- Người giấu mặt (Big Brother) (2014)
- Người kế tiếp (The Next One) (2014)
- Người một nhà
- Người nông dân hiện đại
- Nhà Đầu tư tài ba (Dollars and Sense) (2007–2008)
- Nhân tố bí ẩn - The X Factor
- Nhóm nhảy siêu Việt - Vietnam best Dance Crew
- Ở nhà chủ nhật (1999–2007)
- Ô chữ vàng (BrainTeaser) (2007–2009)
- Ô cửa bí mật (Let's Make a Deal) (2008–2012)
- Ô hay, gì thế này? - Trick of True
- Ông bố hoàn hảo
- Ơn giời cậu đây rồi! (Thank God You Are Here) (2014–2022)
- Quả cầu bí ẩn (Boom!) (2019–2020)
- Quân khu số 1 (upgraded version of Chúng tôi là chiến sĩ, 2022-2025)
- Quý ông đại chiến (Man O Man) (2018–now)
- Quyền lực ghế nóng
- Rung chuông vàng (Challenge! The Golden Bell) (2006–2012)
- Sàn chiến giọng hát - Singer Auction (2018–2021)
- Sáng tạo Việt (2012–2018?)
- Sao nhập ngũ
- Sếp nhí khởi nghiệp – Kiddle Shark
- Siêu đầu bếp (Iron Chef Vietnam) (2012–2013)
- Siêu nhân mẹ - Super Mum
- Siêu sao Ẩm thực (Crazy Market)
- Siêu tính nhẩm (VTV7)
- Sinh ra để tỏa sáng (Born To Shine)
- Song đấu (Versus) (2016)
- Super Junior (VTV7)
- Sức nước ngàn năm (2018-now)
- SV (1996 as SV96, 2000 as SV2000, 2012 as SV2012, 2016 as SV2016, 2020–2021 as SV2020, similar to KVN but not a part of the franchise)
- Tài năng DJ
- Tam sao thất bản (2006–2009)
- Thương vụ bạc tỷ (Shark Tank)
- Tiền khéo tiền khôn
- Tiếp lửa tài năng (based on Đường lên đỉnh Olympia, for the central area)
- Tiếp sức (For the Rest of Your Life) (2008)
- Trạng nguyên nhí (similar to Challenge! The Golden Bell but not a part of the franchise)
- Trạng nguyên tuổi 13 (based on Trạng nguyên nhí but for 13 years old students)
- Trẻ em luôn đúng - The Kids Are All Right (2011–2012; 2013–2015)
- Trời sinh một cặp – It Takes 2
- Thế giới Rap - King Of Rap - Show Me The Money (2020)
- Thiếu niên nói - Teenager Said (2020)
- Thử thách đường phố – Street Fight (2014?)
- Thử thách nhân đôi (Double Dare) (2006–2007)
- Thử thách trốn thoát - The Great Escape
- Tôi yêu thể thao – A Question of Sport
- Trí lực sánh đôi (Body and Brain) (2018?)
- Trò chơi âm nhạc (The Lyrics Board/Don't Forget the Lyrics) (2002–2015)
- Trò chơi liên tỉnh - Intervilles (1996–1997)
- Tranh tài thể thao (2009–2010)
- Trường Teen (VTV7)
- The Debaters (English version of Trường Teen) (VTV7)
- Tường lửa (The Wall) (2019-2020)
- Tỷ lệ may mắn
- Úm ba la ra chữ gì (2019–2020)
- Văn vui vẻ (VTV7)
- Vì bạn xứng đáng (You Deserve It) (2013–2021)
- Vua tiếng Việt
- Vui - khỏe - có ích (2004–now)
- Vui cùng bé yêu (VTV1)
- Vũ điệu đam mê (Got To Dance) (2013)
- Vũ trụ đồng tiền (Money Verse)
- Vượt thời gian (VTV9)
- Vượt thành chiến (Block Out) (2019–2020)

=== HTV ===
- 3-2-1 (2012–2013)
- 5 giây thành triệu phú
- 7 nụ cười xuân
- 1000 độ hot (2016)
- 100% (similar to Family Feud but not a part of the franchise, 2023-2024)
- AHA (2014–2015)
- Ai dám hát (Sing If You Can) (2014)
- Âm nhạc & tuổi trẻ (HTV's first ever game show)
- Ẩm thực kỳ duyên
- À đúng rồi
- Ai cũng bật cười - Laugh Out Loud (2016–2018)
- Ai hiểu mẹ nhất? (2013–2014)
- Ai nhanh hơn (2005–2007?)
- ATM (2008–2009)
- Bậc thầy ẩn danh
- Bạn đường hợp ý
- Bạn là ngôi sao - Be A Star (2017)
- Bạn muốn hẹn hò (Punchi De Deto) (2013-now)
- Bí kíp vàng (2020-now)
- Bí mật đêm chủ nhật (Whose Line Is It Anyway?) (2015–2017)
- Bí mật gia đình (Family Secrets) (2006–2008)
- Biệt đội phấn trắng
- Biệt đội lồng tiếng
- Biệt đội thông thái
- Bố con cùng vui (2012–2014, upgraded version of Tí hon tranh tài)
- Ca sĩ bí ẩn (2017-now)
- Cả nhà thương nhau (2020)
- Cao thủ đấu nhạc (The Big Music Quiz)
- Căn bếp vui nhộn
- Chinh phục thời gian (Conquer Time)
- Cho phép được yêu
- Chọn ai đây (Celebrity Squares/Hollywood Squares) (2020)
- Chọn mặt gửi vàng - Smart Face (2015, 2016)
- Chinh phục đỉnh Everest (2007–2008)
- Chung sức (Family Feud) (2004–2016)
- Chuyện nhỏ (Small Talk) (2005–2007; 2010–2014)
- Chạy đi chờ chi (Running Man (game show))
- Chúng tôi muốn biết - Are You Stylist
- Chúc mừng sinh nhật (2007?)
- Cơ hội đến
- Cơ hội đổi đời
- Cuộc đua kỳ thú - The Amazing Race
- Cười là thua - Laugh And You Lose (2014–2015)
- Đánh thức giai điệu (2010–2012)
- Đàn ông phải thế - My Man Can (2015–2017)
- Đại chiến âm nhạc
- Đại chiến kén rể (2018)
- Đại chiến tứ sắc (Panel Quiz Attack 25) (2019)
- Đầu bếp đỉnh - Top Chef (2015)
- Đầu bếp thượng đỉnh - Top Chef
- Đấu trường 9+
- Đấu trường đường phố
- Đấu trường tiếu lâm - Funny Warriors (2016)
- Đấu trường võ nhạc
- Đèn xanh đèn đỏ
- Đi sao cho đúng (2012–2013)
- Đi tìm ẩn số (Deal or No Deal) (aired as a part of Tạp chí văn nghệ) (2005–2017)
- Điểm số hoàn hảo (Perfect Score) (2014–2015)
- Điệp vụ đối đầu
- Đọ sức âm nhạc (The Fever) (2012–2014)
- Đối mặt thời gian (Face the Clock) (2019-now)
- Đối mặt cảm xúc
- Đúng là 1 đôi
- Đưa em về nhà (Drive Me Home) (2019–2020)
- Đùa như thật - Thật như đùa
- Gia đình tài tử (2010–2017)
- Gia đình thông thái (Family Game Night)
- Giọng ải giọng ai (I Can See Your Voice) (2016-now)
- Giọng ca bất bại (2018)
- Giải mã cặp đôi (2014–2015)
- Giải mã cơ thể - Inche Tamheomdae (Explorers Of The Human Body) (2016)
- Giải mã đàn ông
- Giọng ca bí ẩn (2019)
- Gương mặt điện ảnh
- Góc bếp thông minh
- Hát câu chuyện tình
- Hát cho ngày mai
- Hát cùng mẹ yêu
- Hát là vui - Vui là hát (2011–2012)
- Hát mãi ước mơ (Sing My Dream)
- Hát với ngôi sao (2005–2011)
- Hàng xóm lắm chiêu - Noisy Neighbors (2015–2017)
- Hội ngộ bất ngờ - Ciao Darwin (2007–2009)
- Im lặng là vàng - The Noise
- Kế hoạch gia đình hạnh phúc
- Kim tự tháp (Pyramid) (2005–2008)
- Khẩu vị ngôi sao
- Khi mẹ vắng nhà
- Khi chàng vào bếp (2018–2019)
- Khuấy động nhịp đam mê (2008 - 2009) - Karaoke Kings and Queens (BBC England)
- Khúc hát se duyên - Sing Date
- Khuôn mặt đáng tin - Basic Instinct
- KILOWATT? (2024-present)
- Kỳ tài thách đấu (Ching Roi Ching Lan Wow Wow Wow) (2016-2020)
- Kỳ phùng địch thủ - Lip Sync Battle
- Ký ức bất ngờ
- Lựa chọn thông minh (outdoor version of Supermarket Sweep, but not a part of the franchise)
- Mảnh ghép tình yêu
- Mãi mãi thanh xuân (2018–2019)
- Mặt nạ ngôi sao - King Of Mask Singer
- Mẹ chồng nàng dâu
- Mẹ là nhất
- Mong đợi 1 ngày vui
- Một phút để chiến thắng (Minute to Win It) (2012)
- Mọi người cùng thắng (Every One Win'$) (2005–2006)
- Nào ta cùng hát (2007–2009)
- Ngôi sao tình yêu (The Love Machine)
- Ngôi nhà âm nhạc - Star Academy (Operación Triunfo)
- Ngôi nhà mơ ước (2006–2015)
- Ngạc nhiên chưa (similar to Password but not a part of the franchise, 2015–2020)
- Năng động (2005)
- Nghệ sĩ thử tài P336
- Người ấy là ai - Who Is Single (2018–2020)
- Người bán háng số 1
- Người bí ẩn (Odd One In) (2014–2019)
- Người chiến thắng
- Người đứng vững (Who's Still Standing)
- Người đi xuyên tường nhí (Hole In The Wall, kids version)
- Người hùng tí hon - Pequeños Gigantes (Little Giants)
- Người kế tiếp - Next One (2014–2015)
- Nhanh như chớp (Lightning Quiz) (2018–now)
- Nhanh như chớp nhí - Fah Lab Dek (2018-now)
- Nhạc hội quê hương
- Nhạc hội song ca - Duet Song Festival (2016–2018)
- Nhóc nhà mình
- Nốt nhạc vui (Name That Tune) (2004–2009)
- Nốt nhạc ngôi sao (2009–2010)
- Những em bé thông minh
- P336
- Phái mạnh Việt
- Phản ứng bất ngờ
- Phiên bản hoàn hảo - Cover Star
- Phiên tòa tình yêu - Love Judge
- Quà tặng bất ngờ
- Quà tặng tri thức (2007)
- Quyền năng số 10 (The Power of 10) (2008–2010)
- Quý ông hoàn hảo - Mister Perfect
- RAP Việt - The Rapper (2020-now)
- Rock Việt
- Rồng vàng (unlicensed version of Who Wants to Be a Millionaire?, 2003–2007)
- Sao hỏa sao kim (2020-now)
- Sàn đấu ca từ (2017–2020)
- Sàn đấu thời gian (The Money Pump) (2015–2017)
- Siêu quậy tí hon (2008–2009)
- Siêu sao đoán chữ (Match Game) (2017)
- Sao hay chữ (2019–2020)
- Siêu tài năng nhí - Super 10 (2020-now)
- Siêu thị may mắn (Supermarket Sweep) (2005–2012)
- Siêu nhí đấu trí
- Siêu bất ngờ - Turn Back (2016–2021)
- Siêu sao đoán chữ (Match Game) (2017)
- Siêu hài nhí - Little Big Gang (2016)
- Siêu trí tuệ Việt Nam (The Brain) (2019 - 2021)
- Stinky & Stomper (2006)
- Sức sống thanh xuân
- Sự thật - Thật sự - Lies Allowed
- Taxi may mắn (Cash Cab) (2012)
- Tâm đầu ý hợp (similar to The Newlywed Game but not a part of the franchise, 2020)
- Tần số tình yêu
- Thần tượng bóng rổ
- Thần tượng tương lai
- Thách là chơi
- Thách thức danh hài (Crack Them Up) (2015-2019) (not to be confused with VTV7's English gameshow Crack'em Up)
- Thiên đường ẩm thực - The King Of Food (2015-now)
- Thế giới vui nhộn (Super Trio) (2006–2008)
- Thử thách (2006–2008)
- Thử tài thách trí (Clueless (game show)) (2011–2016)
- Thử thách 99 giây cùng Quyền Linh
- Thử thách cùng bước nhảy - So You Think You Can Dance (2012–2016)
- Thử thách lớn khôn
- Tí hon tranh tài (2011, upgraded version of Siêu quậy tí hon)
- Tìm người bí ẩn (Dirty Rotten Cheater) (2006–2007)
- Tìm người thông minh (Brainiest Kid) (2008)
- Tiếng cười sinh viên
- Tình yêu hoàn mỹ - Perfect Dating (2019-now, later rebranded as Tỏ tình hoàn mỹ)
- Tôi có thể - I Can Do That
- Tôi là người chiến thắng - The Winner Is... (2013–2015)
- Tôi là người dẫn đầu (2012)
- Tôi tuổi Teen (2019)
- Tuyệt chiêu siêu diễn - Lip Sync Ultimate (2016)
- Tuyệt đỉnh tranh tài - Stjernekamp (The Ultimate Entertainer) (2014–2015)
- Trúc xanh (similar to Concentration but not a part of the franchise, 2003–2007)
- Trí khôn ta đây
- Trăng mật diệu kỳ
- Và tôi vẫn hát
- Vận động trường (1999–2000)
- Việc làm
- Về nhà đi anh
- Về trường (Let's Go To School) (2012–2014)
- Vì yêu mà đến - Perfect Dating (2017–2018)
- Vui cùng Hugo
- Vô lăng tình yêu
- Vợ chồng son (2015-now)
- Vua phạt đền - Kick Hero (2017)
- Vui ca đoán giọng
- Vui để học (Trump Card for first season, later similar to Jeopardy! but not a part of the franchise, 2001–2007)
- Vũ điệu tuổi xanh - Baby Ballroom
- Vũ điệu vàng
- Vui cùng con cháu
- Vui cùng Hugo - Hugo
- Vừa đi vừa hát
- Vượt lên chính mình (based on a Thailand gameshow named ปลดหนี้) (2005–2019)
- Vừng ơi mở cửa/Đào thoát - Raid The Cage (2016–2018)
- Xin chào bác tài (aired as a part of Tạp chí văn nghệ)

=== THVL ===
- Ai đúng, ai sai?
- Ai sẽ thành sao
- Ai sẽ thành sao nhí
- Cùng vượt lên chính mình (later rebranded Vượt qua thử thách) (loosely based on Vượt lên chính mình) (2012–2016)
- Ca sĩ giấu mặt (Hidden Singer) (2015–2017)
- Chuyến xe nhân ái
- Ban nhạc quyền năng
- Chơi phải thắng
- Kỳ tài tranh đấu
- Bản lĩnh ngôi sao
- Hát vui - Vui hát
- Truy tìm cao thủ
- Thứ 5 vui nhộn
- Ký ức ngọt ngào
- Người hùng tí hon - Pequeños Gigantes (Little Giants)
- Bức tường bí ẩn - Wall Of Fame (2015)
- Đấu trường âm nhạc - Singing Battle
- Đấu trường âm nhạc nhí - Singing Battle
- Lò võ tiếu lâm
- Ca sĩ thần tượng
- Truy tìm siêu bếp
- Thiên thần đi học
- Tuyệt đỉnh giác quan (2015)
- Cùng nhau hái lộc (2020)
- Vợ tôi là số 1 (2010-now)
- Vui cười - Cười vui (a game show starring Cười xuyên Việt contestants, 2018)
- Người hát tính ca
- Sao là sao
- Thần tài gõ cửa (2010-now)
- Đấu trường tiếu lâm
- Thử tài người nổi tiếng
- Cặp đôi hài hước
- Ẩn số hoàn hảo
- Siêu thủ lĩnh
- Đấu trường ngôi sao
- Chinh phục thần tượng
- Bí ẩn song sinh
- Cả nhà cùng vui
- Tài danh tân cổ
- Tiếu lâm tứ trụ
- Tiếu lâm tứ trụ nhí
- Siêu nhí tranh tài
- Sao là sao
- Hội quán danh hài
- Diêm vương xử án
- Tình Bolero
- Tình ca Việt
- Kịch cùng Bolero
- Vui cùng điệu lý câu hò
- Đoán ca dao, tìm tục ngữ
- Nàng dâu thời nay
- Khát vọng mùa màng
- Khoảnh khắc rực rỡ
- Hành trình đất phương Nam
- Đánh thức đam mê
- Hoa khôi Bolero
- Cười xuyên Việt
- Cười xuyên Việt - tiếu lâm hội

=== BTV (Binh Duong) ===
- Việt Nam quê hương tôi (2000s)
- Công dân @
- Vượt qua thử thách (Not related to the HanoiTV or THVL version at all)

=== VTC ===
- Trò chơi truyền hình xuyên quốc gia (The Biggest Game Show In The World (Asia)) (2011)
- Cùng là tỷ phú
- Thần đồng đất Việt (2016)
- Một phút tỏa sáng
- Bệ phóng tài năng (2009?)
- Hẹn hò bí mật
- Hoàng tử bóng đá - Soccer Prince
- Anh hùng tứ phương
- Cứ nói đi
- Đồng đội 4 chân
- Việt Nam biển bạc
- Chiếc cân may mắn (Perfect Balance!) (2013–2014)
- Cơm ngon Con khỏe
- 1+1=1
- Bé làm người lớn
- Hát hay - hay hát

=== HanoiTV ===
- Khỏe và khéo (2000s)
- Cơ hội chiến thắng (2000s)
- Cơ hội 999
- Nào, hãy mời tôi vào nhà
- Vui cùng nghệ sĩ (formerly known as Khắc họa chân dung) (2003–2006)
- Hộp đen (Black Box) (2007–2009)
- Mã số bí mật (possibly a Northern version of ATM) (before 2009)
- Vượt qua thử thách (The Vault) (2004–2009)
- Những ẩn số vàng (Deal or No Deal) (2006–2009)
- Chơi chữ - BrainTeaser (2009 - 2012)
- Vitamin (before 2011)
- Đuổi hình bắt chữ (Catchphrase) (2004 - 2019; 2020 (upcoming))
- Ai trúng số độc đắc (Have you got the balls?) (2013 - 2015)
- Rồng bay (a game show commemorating 1000th anniversary of Hanoi, 2010)

=== THP (Hai Phong) ===
- Con đường chinh phục
- Con tàu may mắn
- Âm vang sông Hồng
- Siêu thị sao (possibly a Northern version of Siêu thị may mắn)
- Sắc màu hoa phượng

=== ĐNRTV (Dong Nai) ===
- Cầu vồng nghệ thuật
- Nhanh tay lẹ mắt
- Việt Nam quê hương tôi
- Mũi tên vàng

=== HGTV (Ha Giang TV) ===
- Sống vui sống khỏe (loosely based on Vui - khỏe - có ích)

=== KG (Kien Giang TV) ===
- Về Tây Nam (2009)

=== THTG (Tien Giang TV) ===
- Nhà nông tài ba
- Đường đến vinh quang (based on Đường lên đỉnh Olympia) (2009–now)

=== TTV (Thanh Hoa TV) ===
- Âm vang xứ Thanh (based on Đường lên đỉnh Olympia) (2002–2009; 2018–now)
- Nhà nông tài giỏi

=== TTV (Tuyen Quang TV) ===
- Chắp cánh ước mơ

=== THD (Hai Duong TV) ===
- Hành trình tri thức (based on Đường lên đỉnh Olympia)

=== QRT (Quang Nam TV) ===
- Học trò xứ Quảng (based on Đường lên đỉnh Olympia)

=== THĐT (Dong Thap TV) ===
- Tài tử miệt vườn
- Đường đua bồ lúa (2020 - now)

=== TN (Thai Nguyen TV) ===
- Thắp sáng ước mơ

=== BRT (Ba Ria - Vung Tau TV) ===
- Nốt nhạc tuổi thơ
- Cây cọ vàng
- Chung sức tranh tài

=== STV (Soc Trang TV) ===
- Anvil về làng/Syngenta về làng
- Mỹ nhân hành động
- Khám phá tri thức (based on Đường lên đỉnh Olympia)
- Nhà nông vượt khó
- Đấu giá may mắn

=== THTPCT (Can Tho TV) ===
- Nhà nông tài ba
- Lướt sóng

=== QRTV (Quang Tri TV) ===
- Chinh phục (based on Đường lên đỉnh Olympia, not to be confused with the VTV and HTV version which is a part of the Brainiest franchise)
- Vui cùng nhà nông

=== STV (Son La TV) ===
- Về bản em
- Sống vui - Sống khỏe

=== Da Nang TV ===
- Alo - Phú quý đến rồi (loosely based on Vượt lên chính mình)

=== BTV (Bac Ninh TV) ===
- Đất học Kinh Bắc (based on Đường lên đỉnh Olympia)

=== BGTV (Bac Giang TV) ===
- Bắc Giang: Hành trình lịch sử (based on Đường lên đỉnh Olympia)

=== NTV (Ninh Thuan TV) ===
- Những mốc son lịch sử (based on Đường lên đỉnh Olympia)
- Cùng khám phá

=== NTV (Ninh Binh TV) ===
- Âm nhạc và những người bạn (loosely based on first format of Trò chơi âm nhạc)

=== NTV (Nghe An TV) ===
- English Challenge (similar to Đường lên đỉnh Olympia but mainly in English)
- Quê mình xứ Nghệ
- Ông bà mẫu mực - Con cháu thảo hiền
- Tuổi thần tiên

=== THLC (Lao Cai TV) ===
- Thử thách tiếng Anh (English Challenge)
- Biệt tài tí hon
- Tôi tự tin
- Còn mãi thanh xuân (loosely based on Vui - khỏe - có ích)

=== SCTV (Vietnam Television) ===
- Tôi dám hát - Sing If You Can
- Tôi là ai

== See also ==
- Game show
- List of American game shows
- List of Australian game shows
- List of British game shows
- Reality television
