= Eén tegen 100 =

Dutch television game show

- Genre: Game show
- Presented by: Caroline Tensen
- Composers: Hans van Eijck (2001–2005); Martijn Schimmer (2005–present)
- Country of origin: Netherlands
- Original language: Dutch

Production
- Running time: 60 minutes
- Production companies: Endemol Shine Nederland; Televisie Radio Omroep Stichting (2000–2005); Nederlandse Christelijke Radio Vereniging (2009–2015); KRO-NCRV (2015); AVROTROS (2016–2018)

Original release
- Network: Nederland 2 (2000–2005); Talpa (2005–2007); RTL 4 (2007–2009, 2019–); Nederland/NPO 1 (2009–2018)
- Release: 3 September 2000 – present

Eén tegen 100 (1 vs. 100), officially Postcode Loterĳ Eén tegen 100 is a Dutch game show that has been airing since 3 September 2000 on various channels with Caroline Tensen as host. The game pits a single contestant against 100 other people for a chance to win a larger cash prize. It is sponsored by the Nationale Postcode Loterij (National Postal Code Lottery).

== Format ==
One player is selected to play the game as The One against 100 other contestants. The player is selected at random from the 100 (dubbed “The Mob” in the majority of versions), and the One's objective is to eliminate all 100 contestants (or 101, in the Taiwanese version) by correctly answering multiple-choice general knowledge questions.

Depending on the version, after having the opportunity to select a difficulty level or the category, a multiple-choice question with three options is revealed. The 100 is given a short amount of time (normally 6 seconds) to lock in their answer before The One is given the opportunity to answer the question. If the One is correct, any of the 100 contestants who answered the question incorrectly are eliminated from further play, bringing the One closer to winning the game. Depending on the version, the amount of money in the contestant's bank also increases by an amount dependent on the number of contestants are eliminated in that question, or per every set of 10 Mob members eliminated. If The One eliminates all 100 contestants, depending on the version, the One claims all the money in the bank, or win the increased top prize. However, if the One is incorrect, in most versions the game ends and the One leaves with nothing, while any winnings won were split between surviving members of the 100, while some versions, notably Hong Kong, penalizes the contestant some winnings and the game continues until the One misses the question a few more times, and in the UK, where the money is not split. In most versions, the One can choose to leave the game with their accumulated winnings, or risk the winnings for another question.

The One can opt to use lifelines with (or sometimes without) assistance from the Mob, should they find the question difficult. The lifelines varies from finding out how many contestants providing the same response (called “Poll the Mob”), or discussing with two contestants at random with one being the correct answer (“Ask the Mob”) or to trust with the majority and locking the answer automatically (“Trust the Mob”). Lifelines usually stick to these rules, the most notable exception being in the original Dutch version of the rules used by some countries, where lifelines are changed drastically: the One cannot request assistance from the Mob, instead the One has three “dodges”, which halves the prize money to skip past the question, and Mob members eliminated are worth nothing. The One is usually offered a Bonus Dodge for a correct response to a question around the 1 vs. 25 level.

== International versions ==
Country	Name	Host(s)	TV station	Premiere	Finale
(Arab League) Arab World	واحد ضد مئة: المواجهة; Wahed Ded Meah: Al Mouajaha	Moustafa Shaban	Abu Dhabi TV	5 January 2010	29 June 2010
(Arab League) Arab World	واحد ضد مئة: المواجهة; Wahed Ded Meah: Al Mouajaha	Moustafa Shaban	Al-Hayat TV	5 January 2010	29 June 2010
(Arab League) Arab World	واحد ضد مئة: المواجهة; Wahed Ded Meah: Al Mouajaha	Moustafa Shaban	LBC Sat	5 January 2010	29 June 2010
Argentina	Uno contra Todos	Marcelo Tinelli	Canal 13	2004	2006
Australia	1 vs. 100	Eddie McGuire	Nine Network	29 January 2007	13 June 2008
Austria	1 gegen 100	Klaus Eberhartinger	ORF	2008	?
Belarus	Один против всех Odin protiv vseh	George Koldun	ОNТ	20 October 2007	28 June 2014
Belgium (Flanders)	1 tegen 100	Koen Wauters	vtm	7 September 2001	2002
Brazil	Um contra Cem	Roberto Justus	SBT	16 September 2009	18 August 2010
Bulgaria	Един срещу всички Edin sreshtu vsicki	Niki Kanchev	Nova Television	27 February 2007	July 2007
China	以一敌百	Wang Han	Hunan Satellite Television	5 March 2008	31 July 2008
China	以一敌百	Ren Jun	Hunan Satellite Television	15 April 2010	23 December 2010
Colombia	Uno versus Cien	Carlos Calero	RCN	2011	?
Croatia	1 protiv 100	Tarik Filipović	HRT	17 January 2008	26 June 2011
Czech Republic	1 proti 100	Roman Šmucler	TV Nova	21 September 2004	2005
Denmark	1 mod 100	Peter Schmeichel	TV3	2007	?
France	1 contre 100	Benjamin Castaldi	TF1	8 January 2007	25 April 2008
France	Au pied du mur!	Jean-Luc Reichmann	TF1	9 July 2012	31 August 2012
France	Au pied du mur!	Jean-Luc Reichmann	TF1	14 July 2014	19 September 2014
Germany	1 gegen 100	Linda de Mol	RTL	12 January 2002	22 July 2002
Germany	1 gegen 100	Wolfram Kons	RTL	5 May 2008	22 August 2008
Greece	Μονομάχος; Monomahos	Christos Ferentinos	Star Channel	2002	2004
Greece	Μονομάχος; Monomahos	Christos Ferentinos	Skai TV	11 September 2023	14 June 2024
Greece	Φατους Ολους; Fatus Olus	Giorgos Mitsikostas	Alpha TV	2008	2010
Greece	Φατους Ολους; Fatus Olus	Sotiris Kalivatsis	Alpha TV	2008	2010
Hong Kong	以一敵百	Wyman Wong	ATV Home	24 September 2006	15 December 2006
Hungary	Egy a 100 ellen	András Sváby	TV2	24 February 2007	8 June 2007
Indonesia	1 Lawan 100	Anjasmara	Indosiar	13 September 2010	29 April 2011
Israel	אחד נגד מאה; Ehad Neged Meah	Avri Gilad	Channel 2 (Reshet)	8 May 2007	28 June 2013
Italy	1 contro 100	Amadeus	Canale 5	7 May 2007	13 January 2008
Kazakhstan (unlicensed)	Жүзден жүйрік Jüzden jüyrik	Nartai Aralbayuly	Qazaqstan	20 September 2020	28 December 2020
Lithuania	Vienas prieš Visus	Arnoldas Lukošius	LNK	29 August 2008	?
Lithuania	Vienas prieš Visus	Algirdas Ramanauskas	LNK	29 August 2008	?
Norway	Alle mot én	Øyvind Mund	TV2	2006	2007
Philippines	1 vs. 100	Edu Manzano	ABS-CBN	25 August 2007	19 April 2008
Portugal	Um contra Todos	José Carlos Malato	RTP1	2004	2007
Russia	Один против всех Odin protiv vseh	Alexandr Nuzhdin	TV Center	9 December 2007	26 April 2009
Russia	Один против всех Odin protiv vseh	Yana Batyrshina	Carousel	1 September 2013	21 October 2016
Serbia	1 protiv 100	?	RTV Pink	2007	?
South Korea	1 대 100; Il dae baek	Jo Chung Hyun	KBS2	1 May 2007	18 December 2018
Spain	1 contra 100	Juan y Medio	Antena 3	2006	2007
Spain	1 contra 100	Carlos Sobera	Antena 3	2006	2007
Sweden	Alla mot en	Rickard Sjöberg	TV4	3 January 2004	27 May 2005
Switzerland	1 gegen 100	Susanne Kunz	SRF 1	1 September 2008	?
Switzerland	1 gegen 100	René Rindlisbacher	SRF 1	1 September 2008	?
Switzerland	1 gegen 100	Angélique Beldner	SRF 1	1 September 2008	?
Taiwan	挑戰101; Go To Top 101	Hu Gua	CTV General	2 January 2009	27 November 2009
Taiwan	挑戰101; Go To Top 101	Hu Gua	CTi Entertainment	2 January 2009	27 November 2009
Thailand	1 ต่อ 100	Tin Chokkamolkij	Channel 3	5 April 2008	26 July 2008
Tunisia	وحدك ضد مئة; Wahdak Ded Meah	Farah Ben Rajab	Tunis 7	15 February 2007	?
Turkey	1'e Karşı 100	Tamer Karadağlı	Cine5	26 March 2007	?
United Kingdom	1 vs. 100	Dermot O'Leary	BBC One	30 September 2006	23 May 2009
United Kingdom	1 vs. 100	Ben Shephard	BBC One	30 September 2006	23 May 2009
United States	1 vs. 100	Bob Saget	NBC	13 October 2006	22 February 2008
United States	1 vs. 100	Carrie Ann Inaba	GSN	15 November 2010	11 January 2011
Vietnam	Đấu trường 100	Thái Tuấn	VTV3	7 July 2006	28 December 2015

== Top prize winners ==
Several international contestants have managed to defeat all mob members and win the top prize:

Country	Contestants	Prize	Date
Belarus	Nikolai Efimenko	BYR 50,000,000	22 December 2007
Belarus	Alexey Murenkov	BYR 50,000,000	21 February 2009
Belarus	Alexander Matyushenko	BYR 50,000,000	4 December 2010
Brazil	Natan Rodrigues	R$1,000,000	27 May 2010
China	Zhao Bin	¥100,000	16 April 2008
China	Du Xiangyu	¥100,000	1 May 2008
China	He Jiong & Xie Na	¥200,000	9 July 2008
China	Wan Dan	¥100,000	31 July 2008
Germany	Marc Lucas	€100,000	24 July 2010
Hungary	Horvath Gyorgy	Ft. 50,000,000	2007
Israel	Moshe Abu Aziz	₪1,000,000	2010
Italy	Maurizio Biscaro	€200,000	2007
United States	Jason Luna	$1,000,000	4 January 2008
Vietnam	Minh Luân	₫50,000,000	3 September 2012
Vietnam	Trịnh Mỹ Hà	₫50,000,000	5 November 2012
Vietnam	Phan Ngọc Thảo	₫80,000,000	29 July 2013
Vietnam	Đinh Xuân Sơn	₫80,000,000	10 February 2014
Vietnam	Trần Phương Nam	₫80,000,000	19 May 2014
Vietnam	Phạm Văn Đường	₫80,000,000	26 May 2014
Vietnam	Trần Xuân Thành	₫80,000,000	4 August 2014
Vietnam	Nguyễn Xuân Trường	₫80,000,000	20 April 2015

== Video game ==
- 1 vs. 100 (2008 video game)
- 1 vs. 100 (2009 video game)

== See also ==
- Gatekeepers (game show) - A 2010 Singaporean game show with a game format similar to Eén tegen 100, but was not part of the Eén tegen 100 franchise
- Miljoenenjacht
- Postkodmiljonären
