= Beauty and the Geek (American TV series) =

American reality television series

- Genre: Reality television
- Written by: Rob Cohen; Trace Slobotkin; David Wollock
- Directed by: Brian Smith; Lisa Singer Haese; Matt Jackson; Hal Grant
- Starring: Brian McFayden; Mike Richards
- Opening theme: "Opportunities (Let's Make Lots of Money)" by Pet Shop Boys
- Composers: Jeff Lippencott; Mark T. Williams
- Country of origin: United States
- Original language: English
- No. of seasons: 5
- No. of episodes: 48

Production
- Executive producers: Ashton Kutcher; Nick Santora; J. D. Roth; Jason Goldberg; Todd A. Nelson; John Foy
- Producers: Heather Carrington; Dana C. Arnett; Allison Kaz; Paul Hogan; Danny Kon; Steve Youel; Matt Assmus; Matt Westmore; Ian Golding; Julie Singer; Lisa Michelle Singer; Adam Paul; Steve Pilot; Mike Richards; Sean Paulsen; Siegfried Hildebrand; Jessley Ranek; Jamie Sykes; Tee-a Hof
- Cinematography: Darrin Webb; Steve Russell; Adam Sampson; Mark S. Jacobs; Tim Baker
- Editors: D. J. Nurre; Colin Dixon; Jamie Sykes; Stephen Baumhauer; J.R. Arinaga; Josh Lennox; Debra Light; Paul Makkos; Joe Weiss; Scott Zabielski; Michael Degl'Innoenti; Anne-Marie Hess; Marina Catala; Kurt Jones; Ryan Main; William Drucker; Scott Bagley; Katherine Griffin; Mike Barry; Pierre Dwyer; Karl Kimbrough; Teresa O'Mara; Paul Sadowski; Bradford L. Dean; Chris McKnerney; Tori Rodman; Shawn Chou; Greg Berg; Dan Golding; David Dooyun Kim; Robert Marshall; Kathy Messer; Daniel Paek; Joe Shugart; Roger Bourdeau; Daniel Korb; Barry Murphy
- Running time: 46 minutes
- Production companies: Katalyst Films; 3 Ball Productions; Fox 21

Original release
- Network: The WB (2005–2006); The CW (2007–2008)
- Release: June 1, 2005 – May 13, 2008

Related
- Beauty and the Geek

Beauty and the Geek is an American reality television series that premiered on The WB on June 1, 2005. It has been advertised as "The Ultimate Social Experiment" and is produced by Ashton Kutcher, Jason Goldberg and J. D. Roth. The show's title is a parody of Beauty and the Beast. This was the first show produced by the Fox Television Studios sub-division Fox 21.

The show follows groups of "Beauties" (people — almost always women — who rely on their attractiveness and outgoing personalities but typically lack intellect) and "Geeks" (people — almost always men — who rely on their intellect, but typically lack social ability) who must pair up to compete in challenges to avoid elimination. The final pair remaining is declared as being "More than just a Beauty and a Geek" and wins the grand prize of $250,000.

While a competition, the show is also billed as a social experiment, in which each contestant typically learns from their teammate. During the competition, the contestants live in a mansion and compete in a series of challenges, with the beauties competing in challenges of intellect, and the geeks competing in challenges involving social ability.

== Production ==
The theme song, "Opportunities (Let's Make Lots of Money)" by the Pet Shop Boys (originally released in 1985), is used also on the British, Danish and Belgian-Dutch versions. Commercial promos for the show featured a different theme song, "The Geeks Get the Girls" by American Hi-Fi.

Following the second season, the American version moved to The CW, the new network formed when both The WB and UPN ceased operations in September 2006. The two-hour season premiere for the third season aired Wednesday, January 3, 2007 at 8:00 p.m. EST on The CW. The fourth season premiered on September 18, making BATG the first series to premiere for the CW for the 2007-08 television season. Beauty and the Geek was renewed for a fifth season, which premiered on March 12, 2008.

After the fifth season, the show was put on indefinite hiatus in order to stoke renewed interest in the show, and perhaps the addition of innovative twists to the format. In October 2008, casting began for a sixth season, scheduled to air on MTV, with minor celebrities as the beauties. However, a sixth season never materialized.

== Season 1 ==
=== Cast ===
Beauties	Geeks
Cheryl Elliott "Cocktail Waitress"	Eric Chase "Computer Programmer"
Erika Rumsey "Life-size Barbie Model"	Joe Hanson (Note: Hanson came out as transgender in 2021, changing her name to Lily Hanson. This section reflects the male identity Hanson presented at the time of the filming and airing.) "Never Been on a Date"
Krystal Tini "NBA Dancer"	Brad Dancer "Mensa Member"
Lauren Bergfeld "Lingerie Model"	Bill Lambing "V.P. Dukes of Hazzard Fan Club"
Scarlet Garcia "Beer Spokesmodel"	Shawn Bakken "Asst. Boy Scout Master"
Mindi Emanuel "Sorority Girl"	Richard Rubin "Has Never Kissed a Girl" (Note: After incidents where Richard kissed Krystal (in episode 3), Lauren (in episode 4), and Mindi (in episode 6), Richard's title was changed from "Has Never Kissed a Girl" to "Has Kissed One Girl" to "Has Kissed Two Girls" to "Has Kissed Three Girls".)
Caitilin Stoller "Aspiring Fashion Expert"	Chuck Munyon "Med Student: Functional Neurology"

=== Challenges and eliminations ===
Week	Beauty Challenge (Winner)	Geek Challenge (Winner)	Eliminated	Survived Elimination
1	Fifth Grade Knowledge (Mindi)	Dancing Competition (Richard)	Cheryl & Eric	Erika & Joe
2	Car Repair (Caitilin)	Massage (Chuck)	Erika & Joe	Krystal & Brad
3	Rocket Science (Caitilin)	Women's Fashion (Shawn)	Krystal & Brad	Mindi & Richard
4	Math (Lauren)	Get Girls' Phone Numbers (Chuck)	Lauren & Bill	Mindi & Richard
5	Outdoor Challenge (Caitilin & Chuck)		Scarlet & Shawn	Mindi & Richard
6	How much do you know about your partner (Caitilin & Chuck)		Mindi & Richard	Caitilin & Chuck
Winners	Caitilin & Chuck			

=== Episode progress ===
#	Contestants	Episodes					
#	Contestants	1	2	3	4	5	6
1	Caitilin	SAFE	WIN	WIN	SAFE	WIN	WINNER
1	Chuck	SAFE	WIN	SAFE	WIN	WIN	WINNER
2	Mindi	WIN	SAFE	RISK	RISK	RISK	RUNNER-UP
2	Richard	WIN	SAFE	RISK	RISK	RISK	RUNNER-UP
3	Scarlet	SAFE	SAFE	SAFE	SAFE	OUT	
3	Shawn	SAFE	SAFE	WIN	SAFE	OUT	
4	Lauren	SAFE	SAFE	SAFE	OUT		
4	Bill	SAFE	SAFE	SAFE	OUT		
5	Krystal	SAFE	RISK	OUT			
5	Brad	SAFE	RISK	OUT			
6	Erika	RISK	OUT				
6	Joe	RISK	OUT				
7	Cheryl	OUT					
7	Eric	OUT					

The contestants won the competition.
The contestant won the challenge and their pair was safe from elimination.
The contestant's partner won the challenge and they were safe from elimination.
The contestant did not win the challenge, but their pair was safe from elimination.
The contestant and their partner survived elimination.
The contestant and their partner was eliminated.
The contestant or their partner won the challenge and were also eliminated.

== Season 2 ==
=== Cast ===
Beauties	Geeks	Notes
Amanda Horan "Hairstylist"	Brandon Blankenship "Assistant Neurobiologist"	Amanda's Week 1 partner: Chris; Brandon's Week 1 partner: Tristin (Note: After winning the first challenge, original partners Chris & Amanda were allowed to choose any two teams (including themselves) and swap their partnerships. They opted to swap themselves and Brandon & Tristin.)
Brittany Knott "Tanning Salon Administrator"	Joe Block "Speed Chess Champion"	
Cher Tenbush "Beer Spokesmodel"	Josh Herman "Museum Critic"	
Danielle Gonzalez "Cocktail Waitress"	Karl Hench "Dungeon Master"	
Jennipher Johnson "Camp Counselor"	Ankur Mehta "MIT Graduate"	
Sarah Coleman "Dental Assistant"	Wes Wilson "Tracks Monkeys With Lasers"	
Thais Soares "Model"	Tyson Mao "Rubik's Cube Record Holder"	
Tristin Clow "Cocktail Waitress/Shot Girl"	Chris Saroki "Has Only Kissed One Girl"	Tristin's Week 1 partner: Brandon Chris's Week 1 partner: Amanda

=== Episode progress ===
#	Contestants	Episodes							
#	Contestants	1	2	3	4	5	6	7	8
1	Cher	SAFE	WIN	WIN	RISK	SAFE	RISK	WIN	WINNER
1	Josh	SAFE	SAFE	SAFE	RISK	WIN	RISK	WIN	WINNER
2	Brittany	SAFE	SAFE	SAFE	SAFE	WIN	SAFE	RISK	RUNNER-UP
2	Joe	SAFE	SAFE	WIN	SAFE	SAFE	WIN	RISK	RUNNER-UP
3	Jennipher	SAFE	SAFE	SAFE	SAFE	RISK	WIN	OUT	
3	Ankur	SAFE	SAFE	SAFE	SAFE	RISK	SAFE	OUT	
4	Sarah	SAFE	SAFE	SAFE	SAFE	SAFE	OUT		
4	Wes	SAFE	SAFE	SAFE	WIN	SAFE	OUT		
5	Danielle	SAFE	SAFE	SAFE	SAFE	OUT			
5	Karl	SAFE	SAFE	SAFE	SAFE	OUT			
6	Tristin	SAFE	RISK	RISK	OUT				
6	Chris	WIN	RISK	RISK	OUT				
7	Thais	SAFE	SAFE	OUT					
7	Tyson	SAFE	WIN	OUT					
8	Amanda	WIN	OUT						
8	Brandon	SAFE	OUT						

The contestants won the competition.
The contestant won the challenge and their pair was safe from elimination.
The contestant's partner won the challenge and they were safe from elimination.
The contestant did not win the challenge but their pair was safe from elimination.
The contestant and their partner survived elimination.
The contestant and their partner was eliminated.

=== Challenges and eliminations ===
Week	Beauty Challenge (Winner)	Geek Challenge (Winner)	Eliminated	Survived Elimination
1	Quiz (Amanda & Chris)		No eliminations	
2	Public Speaking (Cher)	Karaoke (Tyson)	Amanda & Brandon	Tristin & Chris
3	Assemble a computer and burn a song (Cher)	Interior decorating (Joe)	Thais & Tyson	Tristin & Chris
4	Makeover for the Geeks	Speed dating (Wes)	Tristin & Chris	Cher & Josh
5	Strip poker (Brittany)	Party planning (Josh)	Danielle & Karl	Jennipher & Ankur
6	Frumpy flirting (Jennipher)	Fashion photography (Joe)	Sarah & Wes	Cher & Josh
7	Navigation (Cher)	Shopping (Josh)	Jennipher & Ankur	Brittany & Joe
8	How their partners think (Cher & Josh)		Brittany & Joe	Cher & Josh
Winners	Cher & Josh			

== Season 3 ==
=== Cast ===
Beauties	Geeks	Episode Eliminated
Megan Hauserman "Playboy Model"	Alan "Scooter" Zackheim "Harvard Graduate"	Winners
Cecille Gahr "Bikini Model"	Nate Dern "Singer: Star Wars Band"	Episode 7
Jennylee Berns "U.F.C. Ring Girl"	Niels Hoven "Had A Perfect S.A.T. Score"	Episode 6
Nadia Underwood "Sorority Girl"	Mario Muscar "Owns 25,000 Comics"	Episode 5
Erin Gipson "Voice Teacher"	Drew Sawa "Trekker"	Episode 4
Andrea Ciliberti "Beauty Pageant Queen"	Matt Herman "M.I.T. Graduate"	Episode 3
Sheree Swanson "Former Hooters Waitress"	Piao Sam "Has Only Kissed One Girl"	Episode 2
Tori Elmore "Model"	Sanjay Shah "Virgin"	Episode 1 pt. 2

=== Episode progress ===
#	Contestants	Episodes							
#	Contestants	1		2	3	4	5	6	7
1	Megan	SAFE	SAFE	SAFE	SAFE	SAFE	WIN	WIN	WINNER
1	Scooter	SAFE	SAFE	SAFE	SAFE	WIN	SAFE	WIN	WINNER
2	Cecille	WIN	SAFE	SAFE	RISK	WIN	SAFE	RISK	RUNNER-UP
2	Nate	WIN	WIN	SAFE	RISK	SAFE	WIN	RISK	RUNNER-UP
3	Jennylee	SAFE	SAFE	SAFE	WIN	RISK	RISK	OUT	
3	Niels	SAFE	SAFE	SAFE	WIN	RISK	RISK	OUT	
4	Nadia	SAFE	SAFE	WIN	SAFE	SAFE	OUT		
4	Mario	SAFE	SAFE	WIN	SAFE	SAFE	OUT		
5	Erin	SAFE	RISK	SAFE	SAFE	OUT			
5	Drew	SAFE	RISK	SAFE	SAFE	OUT			
6	Andrea	SAFE	SAFE	RISK	OUT				
6	Matt	SAFE	SAFE	RISK	OUT				
7	Sheree	SAFE	WIN	OUT					
7	Piao	SAFE	SAFE	OUT					
8	Tori	SAFE	OUT						
8	Sanjay	SAFE	OUT						

The contestants won the competition.
The contestant won the challenge and their pair was safe from elimination.
The contestant's partner won the challenge and they were safe from elimination.
The contestant did not win the challenge but their pair was safe from elimination.
The contestant and their partner survived elimination.
The contestant and their partner was eliminated.

=== Challenges and eliminations ===
Week	Beauty Challenge (Winner)	Geek Challenge (Winner)	Eliminated	Survived Elimination
1 (Part 1)	Library Search (Cecille)	Social Challenge (Nate)		
1 (Part 2)	News Interview (Sheree)	Stand-up Comedy (Nate)	Tori & Sanjay	Erin & Drew
2	Museum Tour Guiding (Nadia)	Model Quiz (Mario)	Sheree & Piao	Andrea & Matt
3	Geek Makeover & Charity Auction (Jennylee & Niels)		Andrea & Matt	Cecille & Nate
4	Beach Escape Challenge (Cecille)	Fitness Instructor (Scooter)	Erin & Drew	Jennylee & Niels
5	Building a Doghouse (Megan)	Collecting Phone Numbers (Nate)	Nadia & Mario	Jennylee & Niels
6	Ranch Duties Challenge (Megan & Scooter)		Jennylee & Niels	Cecille & Nate
7	Who Changed the Most (decided by previously eliminated contestants) (Megan & Scooter)		Cecille & Nate	Megan & Scooter
Winners	Megan & Scooter (Nate reportedly spoke to all of the other teams and told them not to vote for him and Cecille to win, because he recognized Cecille had learned nothing from the show and didn't deserve to win, which he ultimately was OK with even though he was passing up a lot of money because the other teams had planned to vote for him & Cecille to win solely because they liked Nate a great deal)			

== Season 4 ==
=== Cast ===
Beauties	Geeks
Amanda Hanshaw "Aspiring Playboy Model"	Tony Tran "Biomedical student"
Erin Schneider "Beautician"	Jesse Yeary "Lives with parents"
Hollie Winnard "Professional Betty Boop"	Josh Bishop-Moser "Rubberband Club President"
Jasmine Moore "Babysitter"	David Olsen "LARPer"
Jennifer Carter "Cigar Model"	William McDonald "Server, Online gamer"
Katie Roberson "Sorority Girl"	Luke Neyer "Robotics Engineer"
Natalie Reeves "Ultimate Hooters Girl"	John Gardner "Perfect 5.0 at MIT"
Rebecca Nichols "Cocktail Waitress"	Will Frank "Software Engineer"
Shalandra "Shay" Champ "Beauty Pageant Queen"	Joshua Green "Astrophysicist"
Sam Horrigan "Club Promoter"	Nicole Morgan "Musicologist"

=== Episode progress ===
#	Contestants	Episodes									
#	Contestants	1	2	3	4	5	6	7	8	9	10
1	Jasmine	SAFE	SAFE	SAFE	SAFE	SAFE	SAFE	SAFE	SAFE	WIN	WINNER
1	David	SAFE	SAFE	SAFE	SAFE	SAFE	SAFE	WIN	WIN	WIN	WINNER
2	Sam	SAFE	WIN	SAFE	WIN	RISK	WIN	WIN	WIN	RISK	RUNNER-UP
2	Nicole	SAFE	SAFE	SAFE	SAFE	RISK	WIN	SAFE	SAFE	RISK	RUNNER-UP
3	Jen	SAFE	SAFE	SAFE	RISK	SAFE	SAFE	RISK	RISK	OUT	
3	William	SAFE	SAFE	SAFE	RISK	SAFE	SAFE	RISK	RISK	OUT	
4	Shay	WIN	SAFE	SAFE	SAFE	WIN	SAFE	RISK	OUT		
4	Joshua	WIN	SAFE	SAFE	SAFE	SAFE	SAFE	RISK	OUT		
5	Natalie	SAFE	RISK	SAFE	SAFE	SAFE	RISK	OUT			
5	John	SAFE	RISK	SAFE	SAFE	WIN	RISK	OUT			
6	Erin	SAFE	SAFE	RISK	SAFE	SAFE	OUT				
6	Jesse	SAFE	SAFE	RISK	WIN	SAFE	OUT				
7	Katie	SAFE	SAFE	SAFE	SAFE	OUT					
7	Luke	SAFE	SAFE	SAFE	SAFE	OUT					
8	Rebecca	SAFE	SAFE	WIN	OUT						
8	Will	SAFE	WIN	WIN	OUT						
9	Hollie	SAFE	SAFE	OUT							
9	Josh	SAFE	SAFE	OUT							
10	Amanda	SAFE	OUT								
10	Tony	SAFE	OUT								

The contestants won the competition.
The contestant won the challenge and their pair was safe from elimination.
The contestant's partner won the challenge and they were safe from elimination.
The contestant did not win the challenge but their pair was safe from elimination.
The contestant and their partner survived elimination.
The contestant and their partner were eliminated.

=== Challenges and eliminations ===
Week	Beauty Challenge (Winner)	Geek Challenge (Winner)	Eliminated	Survived Elimination
1	Intellectual Skills Analysis (lowest score wins) (Shay)	Social Skills Analysis (lowest score wins) (Joshua)	No eliminations	
2	Debating (Sam)	Rap Off (Will)	Amanda & Tony	Natalie & John
3	Anatomy Body Paint (Rebecca)	Romantic Gift Basket (Will)	Hollie & Josh	Erin & Jesse
4	Rocket Building (Sam)	Massage Skills (Jesse)	Rebecca & Will	Jen & William
5	Teaching 3rd Graders (Shay)	Prom King or Queen (John)	Katie & Luke	Sam & Nicole
6	Comic-Con Superhero Challenge (Sam & Nicole)		Erin & Jesse	Natalie & John
7	Mayan Glyph Memorization (Sam)	Salsa Dancing (David)	Natalie & John	Shay & Joshua Jen & William (Note: There was no elimination room finale; instead, the two challenge-winning teams selected a team to eliminate directly.)
8	Zoology/Insect Challenge (Sam)	Flair Bartending Challenge (David)	Shay & Joshua	Jen & William
9	Wine Challenge (Jasmine & David)		Jen & William	Sam & Nicole
10	Viewer's Vote (Note: For the first time, the show's winner was decided by America's votes, four months after the taping of the first 12 episodes.)		Sam & Nicole	David & Jasmine
Winners	David & Jasmine			

== Season 5 ==
Season 5 premiered on March 11, 2008, taking over the timeslot of Reaper. For the first three episodes, the beauties competed as a group against the team of geeks. The remaining beauties and geeks then paired off to compete against the other pairs, as in previous seasons.

=== Cast ===
Beauties	Geeks
Amber Griffin "Runway Model"	John English "Child Genius"
Jillian Beyor "Playboy Cyber Club Model"	Jonathan Prater "Mama's Boy"
Tiffany Wade "One Tough Mama"	Jim Babcock "Video Game Programmer"
Cara Goldberg "Aspiring Soap Star"	Chris Follett "MIT Oceanographer"
Tara McComas "Daisy Dukes Hostess"	"Cowboy" Joe Cortez; Assignment Desk Editor
Randi Ferrera "The Navy Diva"	Greggy Soriano "Self-Proclaimed 'Gaysian'"
Kristina Savenok "Daddy's Girl"	Jason Prager "One Buff Geek"
Leticia Cline "Extreme Sports Model"	Matt Carter "The Poet"
Amanda Corey "Hawaiian Tropic Model"	Tommy Severo "Sweater Vest Enthusiast"

Note: John, Amber and Jillian were all eliminated before the teams paired. Jonathan was left without a partner and was therefore eliminated.

=== Episode progress ===
#	Contestants	Episodes									
#	Contestants	1	2	3	4	5	6	7	8	9	10
1	Amanda	WIN	RISK	WIN	SAFE	SAFE	SAFE	WIN	RISK	RISK	WINNER
1	Tommy	RISK	WIN	RISK	WIN	SAFE	WIN	WIN	RISK	RISK	WINNER
2	Cara	WIN	SAFE	WIN	WIN	SAFE	SAFE	RISK	SAFE	RISK	RUNNER-UP
2	Chris	RISK	WIN	RISK	SAFE	SAFE	SAFE	RISK	WIN	RISK	RUNNER-UP
3	Leticia	WIN	SAFE	WIN	RISK	WIN	SAFE	RISK	WIN	OUT	
3	Matt	SAFE	WIN	RISK	RISK	WIN	SAFE	RISK	SAFE	OUT	
4	Tara	WIN	SAFE	WIN	SAFE	SAFE	RISK	RISK	OUT		
4	Joe	RISK	WIN	RISK	SAFE	SAFE	RISK	RISK	OUT		
5	Kristina	WIN	RISK	WIN	SAFE	SAFE	WIN	OUT			
5	Jason	SAFE	WIN	RISK	SAFE	SAFE	SAFE	OUT			
6	Randi	WIN	RISK	WIN	SAFE	SAFE	OUT				
6	Greggy	SAFE	WIN	RISK	SAFE	SAFE	OUT				
7	Tiffany	WIN	SAFE	WIN	OUT						
7	Jim	SAFE	WIN	RISK	OUT						
15	Jonathan	RISK	WIN	RISK	OUT						
16	Jillian	WIN	RISK	OUT							
17	Amber	WIN	OUT								
18	John	OUT									

The contestants won the competition.
The contestant won the challenge and their pair was safe from elimination.
The contestant's partner won the challenge and they were safe from elimination.
The contestant did not win the challenge but their pair was safe from elimination.
The contestant and their partner survived elimination.
The contestant and their partner was eliminated.

=== Challenges and eliminations ===
Week	Challenge (Winner)		Eliminated	Survived Elimination
Week	Beauties	Geeks	Eliminated	Survived Elimination
1	Getting Phone Numbers (Beauties)		John	Chris, Joe, Jonathan, Tommy
2	Talent Show (Geeks)		Amber	Amanda, Jillian, Kristina, Randi
3	Flag Football Game (Beauties) (Note: For this challenge, one member of each team was required to temporarily join the other team. After the selections were made, the contestants were informed that the temporary member of the losing team would be automatically eliminated.)		Jillian	Chris
3	Teammate draft (Note: The seven remaining beauties were asked to each pair up with a geek. The last remaining unpaired geek would be eliminated.)		Jonathan	All other geeks
4	Science Fair (Cara)	Love Hotline (Tommy)	Tiffany & Jim	Leticia & Matt
5	Geek Makeover & Soap Opera Challenge (Leticia & Matt)		No Elimination	
6	Garbage Math (Kristina)	Geek Firefighter (Tommy)	Randi & Greggy	Tara & Joe
7	Building a Sled (Amanda & Tommy)		Kristina & Jason	Leticia & Matt, Cara & Chris, Tara & Joe (Note: Instead of elimination trivia, each losing team cast a vote for another team to be eliminated. Since each team received one vote for elimination, Tommy and Amanda cast the tie-breaking vote.)
8	Plumbing (Leticia)	Geeky Girls' Makeovers (Chris)	Tara & Joe	Amanda & Tommy
9.1	How Well Do You Know Your Partner		Leticia & Matt	Amanda & Tommy, Cara & Chris
9.2	Former Cast Members Hunt in LA (Amanda & Tommy)		Cara & Chris	Amanda & Tommy
Winners	Amanda & Tommy			

== Contestants who appeared on other competition shows ==
- Richard Rubin would later appear on 1 vs 100 as a member of the mob.
- Tyson Mao appeared on Identity as a stranger.
- Megan Hauserman appeared on the second season of Rock of Love with Bret Michaels, finishing in 5th place; the first season of I Love Money, where she quit on the last episode, officially finishing in 3rd place; and Rock of Love: Charm School, getting expelled on the 4th episode. She would later get her own dating game show: Megan Wants a Millionaire.
- Greggy Soriano competed on the first season of Cake Boss's Next Great Baker, where he was eliminated in 7th place.
- Jason Prager appeared on season 1 of The Gong Show revival.
