= 1 vs. 100 (Chinese game show) =

Chinese television game show

- Chinese: 以一敌百
- Genre: Game show
- Created by: Endemol
- Starring: Wang Han (season 1); Ren Jun (season 2)
- Country of origin: China
- No. of episodes: 16 (season 1); 35 (season 2)

Production
- Running time: about 90 minutes per episode (inc. commercials)

Original release
- Network: Hunan Satellite Television
- Release: March 5, 2008 – December 23, 2010

In 2008 and 2010, Hunan Satellite Television produced the Chinese version of 1 vs. 100, which has the same name as the Hong Kong version, called 以一敌百 (literally translated "to oppose 100 people by 1 person"). The first season was aired between March 5 and July 31, 2008, and the second season was premiered on April 15, 2010, and ended on December 23, 2010. The host was Wang Han (汪涵) in season 1 and Ren Jun (任军) in season 2.

== Game rules ==
Mobs eliminated	Player's total (season 1) (happy golden balls)	Player's total (season 2) (gold coins)
10-19	500	1,000
20-29	1,000	2,000
30-39	2,000	3,000
40-49	5,000	5,000
50-59	10,000	8,000
60-69	20,000	10,000
70-79	30,000	15,000
80-89	40,000	20,000
90-99	50,000	25,000
100	100,000	50,000

The show adopts the uses the season 2 rules of the American version. The mobs of this version are called "happy answerers" (快乐答人) in season 1 and "pass keepers" (守关者) in season 2. For the new rules, the One progresses the payout ladder for every 10 Mob members eliminated in succession, given in "happy gold balls" (快乐金球), which can be used to shop in Happigo (season 1) or "gold coins" (season 2), either one of each currency equals to one Renminbi.

If the "One" answers four questions (three questions in season 1) correctly, the contestant decides on whether to leave with the accumulated winnings or risk all and continue playing; if at any point the "One" answers incorrectly, the "One" loses all of their winnings while the winnings were to split amongst any remaining Mob members. During the game, the player can use any helps:

- Ask the answerers (询问答人) (Choose one from two (对错二选一) in Season 2): two Mob members are randomly selected: one who answered correctly and one who answered incorrectly. Each explains his or her decision to the contestant, which in turn eliminates the third choice from consideration.
- Poll the answerers (求证答人): Appeared only on Season 1, the One selects one of the three answers to get more information about. The number of Mob members who chose that answer is revealed, and the contestant chooses one of the revealed mob members to discuss his or her response.
- Trust the answerers (信任答人) (Trust the majority (信任大多数) in Season 2): the One is automatically committed to the answer chosen most frequently by the Mob.
- Call for help (电话帮帮忙): Appeared on Season 2 in replacement from Poll the answerers, the One can get help by phoning a friend.

== Special episodes ==
=== Season 1 ===
- Episode 9, 10, 13 and 14 uses a format similar to the "Battle of the Sexes" of the American version. All the answerers were men in episode 9 and 10, and women in episode 13 and 14.
- In episode 11, the prizes were in cash and the top prize was 200,000 Renminbi. The total of 300,000 Renminbi given out in this episode were donated for rebuilding the site of 2008 Sichuan earthquake. Additionally, the format uses less than 100 Mob members with two Mob members participating as the "One", similar to the "Last Man Standing" special episode of the American version.
- All the answerers in episode 12 were kids, similar to the American Season 1 episode aired February 2, 2007.
- In episode 16, the season one finale, the top prize also include a car in addition to beating 100 mob members.

== Season summary ==
Contestant won the top prize
Contestant left the game with their winnings
Contestant was defeated and loses their winnings to remaining Mob members

=== List of contestants of season 1 ===
Episode	Date	Contestant	Number of questions answered	Number of Mob members remaining	Accumulated winnings	Remarks
1	March 5, 2008	Yang Yajin (杨雅晋)	8	16 to 10	40,000	
1	March 5, 2008	Yi Pei (易培)	8	8 to 0	50,000	
2	March 12, 2008	Li Ying (李莹)	6	13 to 12	40,000	
2	March 12, 2008	Luo Manhan (罗曼翰)	6	21 to 16	30,000	The contestant was a foreign teacher from Pakistan.
3	March 19, 2008	Zhang Sichi (张斯驰)	3	54 to 22	5,000	
3	March 19, 2008	Yin Shuiming (殷水明)	5	12 to 4	40,000	
3	March 19, 2008	Zeng Yu (曾玉)	6	23 to 5	50,000	His performance was shown over two episodes.
4	March 26, 2008	Lu Yi (吕奕)	6	18 to 4	50,000	
4	March 26, 2008	Shu Cheng (舒骋)	4	53 to 7	5,000	
4	March 26, 2008	Pan Danfen (潘丹芬)	3	42 to 8	10,000	
5	April 2, 2008	Luo Xuan (罗璇)	2	73 to 50	1,000	
5	April 2, 2008	Zhang Xiangdong (张湘东)	3	19 to 15	40,000	
5	April 2, 2008	Yang Zhuo (杨卓)	3	64 to 22	2,000	
5	April 2, 2008	Ma Xiaojie (马潇洁)	5	37 to 13	20,000|	
6	April 9, 2008	Xu Jing (许静)	5	18 to 16	40,000	
6	April 9, 2008	Wan Dan (万丹)	8	1 to 0	50,000	
7	April 16, 2008	Zhao Bin (赵斌)	7	2 to 0	100,000	
7	April 16, 2008	Tu Yu (涂宇)	4	58 to 24	5,000	
8	April 23, 2008	Liu Qinzhe (刘沁哲)	6	5 to 3	50,000	Liu was the youngest contestant to participate at 12 years old.
8	April 23, 2008	Ji Fengxia (季凤霞)	6	18 to 12	40,000	
9	May 1, 2008 (rebroadcast on May 7, 2008)	Nian Ying (年颖)	5	12 to 7	50,000	All Mob members in the episode were Male and the One being female; Du Xiangyu was the last answerer remaining in episode 6 (Wan Dan's game).
9	May 1, 2008 (rebroadcast on May 7, 2008)	Du Xiangyu (杜湘瑜)	9	1 to 0	100,000	All Mob members in the episode were Male and the One being female; Du Xiangyu was the last answerer remaining in episode 6 (Wan Dan's game).
10	May 14, 2008	Duan Hong (段鸿)	6	12 to 4	40,000	All Mob members in the episode were Male and the One being female; Du Xiangyu was the last answerer remaining in episode 6 (Wan Dan's game).
10	May 14, 2008	Qiu Yiping (邱亿平)	To Be Determined			All Mob members in the episode were Male and the One being female; Du Xiangyu was the last answerer remaining in episode 6 (Wan Dan's game).
11	July 9, 2008	Ji Jie (吉杰); Tan Weiwei (谭维维)	7	7 to 4	100,000	A group of two was selected among the Mob, hence becoming 1 vs 98. All the prizes were in actual ¥ and were donated for rebuilding the site of 2008 Sichuan earthquake. Top prize was briefly raised to 200,000.
11	July 9, 2008	He Jiong (何炅); Xie Na (谢娜)	9	2 to 0	200,000	A group of two was selected among the Mob, hence becoming 1 vs 98. All the prizes were in actual ¥ and were donated for rebuilding the site of 2008 Sichuan earthquake. Top prize was briefly raised to 200,000.
12	July 10, 2008	Zheng Yuanjie (郑渊洁)	7	12 to 4	40,000	All Mob members featuring this episode featuring Kids, Xu Jiao (徐娇) was among them.
12	July 10, 2008	Chen Jie (陈洁)	3	49 to 27	10,000	All Mob members featuring this episode featuring Kids, Xu Jiao (徐娇) was among them.
12	July 10, 2008	Hu Shizhu (胡石柱)	To Be Determined			All Mob members featuring this episode featuring Kids, Xu Jiao (徐娇) was among them.
13	July 16, 2008	Li Huan (李桓)	7	7 to 2	50,000	All Mob members in the episode were Female and the One being male; Xia Donghao was a mesmerist from Taiwan.
13	July 16, 2008	Xia Donghao (夏东豪)	9	14 to 4	40,000	All Mob members in the episode were Female and the One being male; Xia Donghao was a mesmerist from Taiwan.
14	July 17, 2008	He Yikun (何轶昆)	5	29 to 10	30,000	All Mob members in the episode were Female and the One being male; Xia Donghao was a mesmerist from Taiwan.
14	July 17, 2008	Wei Jiayin (魏佳音)	11	11 to 2	50,000	All Mob members in the episode were Female and the One being male; Xia Donghao was a mesmerist from Taiwan.
15	July 24, 2008	Wu Zhenxing (吴振星); Liu Shufang (刘淑芳)	5	11 to 7	40,000	Guo Chunning (郭春宁), the designer of Dancing Beijing, a group of designers of the medals of the 2008 Summer Olympics, and some torchbearers (such as Xiao Xu and Zhang Chaowei) of the 2008 Summer Olympics torch relay were featured as Mob members.
15	July 24, 2008	Xiao Xu (肖旭)	6	32 to 14	20,000	Guo Chunning (郭春宁), the designer of Dancing Beijing, a group of designers of the medals of the 2008 Summer Olympics, and some torchbearers (such as Xiao Xu and Zhang Chaowei) of the 2008 Summer Olympics torch relay were featured as Mob members.
15	July 24, 2008	Zhang Chaowei (张朝炜)	8	5 to 5	50,000	Guo Chunning (郭春宁), the designer of Dancing Beijing, a group of designers of the medals of the 2008 Summer Olympics, and some torchbearers (such as Xiao Xu and Zhang Chaowei) of the 2008 Summer Olympics torch relay were featured as Mob members.
16	July 31, 2008	Yi Pei (易培)	8	2 to 2	50,000	Yi Pei and Wan Dan were previously contested on episode 1 and 6 respectively. Liu Qinzhe, the 12-year-old contestant of episode 8, was one of the Mob members. Wan Dan also won a Car for eliminating all 100 mobs successfully.
16	July 31, 2008	Wan Dan (万丹)	12	1 to 0	100,000 (+ car)	Yi Pei and Wan Dan were previously contested on episode 1 and 6 respectively. Liu Qinzhe, the 12-year-old contestant of episode 8, was one of the Mob members. Wan Dan also won a Car for eliminating all 100 mobs successfully.

=== List of top prize winners of season 2 ===
Episode	Date	Name	The One/The Mob
2	April 29, 2010	Huang Zheng (黄征)	Mob
4	May 13, 2010	Liu Zhong (刘众)	Mob
7	June 3, 2010	Qin Lai (覃徕)	Mob
15	August 5, 2010	Xie Chaochun (谢朝春)	Mob
25	October 14, 2010	Long Tingting (龙婷婷)	Mob
29	November 11, 2010	Li Mingyu (李鸣宇)	One
30	November 11, 2010	Su Hong (苏红)	One
33	December 9, 2010	Zheng Anqi (郑安琦)	One
33	December 9, 2010	Kong Weijia (孔维佳)	One
34	December 16, 2010	Zheng Yu (郑宇)	Mob
35	December 23, 2010	Gao Jing (高婧)	One
35	December 23, 2010	Mu Qi Miya (母其弥雅)	One
