= Joseph Hansen =

Joseph or Joe Hansen or Hanson may refer to:

- Joe Hanson (soccer) (born 2003), Canadian football player
- Joseph Hansen (dancer) (1842–1907), Belgian dancer and choreographer
- Joseph Hansen (historian) (1863–1943), German historian of witchcraft trials
- Joseph Hansen (socialist) (1910–1979), American socialist leader
- Joseph Hansen (writer) (1923–2004), American crime writer
- Joseph T. Hansen (born 1943), American labor leader
- Joseph Hansen (rower) (born 1979), American rower and 2004 Olympic gold medalist

== See also ==
- Lily Hanson (Joe Hanson, born 1983), American writer and comedian
