= Divided (British game show) =

British quiz show

- Genre: Game show
- Created by: Aurélien Lipiansky; Clément Gayet
- Developed by: Brainbox-Talpa
- Presented by: Andrew Castle
- Starring: Charlotte Hudson (2009); Rachel Pierman (2010)
- Country of origin: United Kingdom
- Original language: English
- No. of series: 2
- No. of episodes: 53 (7 unaired)

Production
- Running time: 60 minutes (inc. adverts)
- Production companies: Talpa; Brighter Pictures (2009); Remarkable Television (2010)

Original release
- Network: ITV1
- Release: 18 May 2009 – 7 May 2010

Divided is a British game show that aired on ITV1 from 18 May 2009 to 7 May 2010. It was hosted by Andrew Castle with Charlotte Hudson as the Question Master for Series 1 and Rachel Pierman as the Question Master for Series 2.

== Format ==
A team of three complete strangers attempt to answer up to 15 questions over the course of five rounds and accumulate as much money in a prize pot as possible. In the first four rounds, each question is either multiple-choice with one correct answer to be chosen from three options, or a list of three items to be placed in a specified order. The fifth round has a single question with three answer options, more than one of which may be correct, and the team must select all correct answers in order to win the money.

The team has 100 seconds to arrive at a unanimous decision on each question, and the money at stake decreases continuously at a rate of 1% per second that elapses before they lock in their choice. A correct answer adds the remaining money to a prize pot, while an incorrect answer or running out of time cuts the pot in half. If the team misses a total of three questions, the game ends immediately and the team forfeits all winnings.

The payout structure for each round is shown below.

Round	Question value	Number of questions	Lost per second	Potential maximum (round)	Potential maximum (overall)
1	£3,000	5	£30	£15,000	£15,000
2	£7,500	4	£75	£30,000	£45,000
3	£15,000	3	£150	£45,000	£90,000
4	£30,000	2	£300	£60,000	£150,000
5	£75,000	1	£750	£75,000	£225,000

At the end of each of the first four rounds, the team is given 15 seconds to decide whether to continue the game, or stop playing and divide up the money. If they elect to continue or fail to reach a unanimous decision before time runs out, the next round begins automatically.

When the team either completes the fifth round or chooses to stop playing, the money in the prize pot is divided into three unequal shares, typically 50-70%, 20-40%, and 10%. Each player is given 15 seconds to state their case to the others as to which share they feel they deserve, after which all three select the share they want. If each player selects a different share, they each receive their chosen amount and the game ends. If not, they are given a further 100 seconds to discuss the splits among themselves and try to reach a consensus, with all three shares decreasing by 1% per second. The timer pauses briefly after 50 seconds, and the host reminds them that half their money has gone. If the team agrees on a split before time runs out, they receive whatever is left of their chosen shares; otherwise, the team leaves with nothing.

== Academic paper ==
The show has been studied by a team of economists. They find that individual behaviour and outcomes are strongly influenced by equity concerns: those who contributed more to the jackpot claiming larger shares are less likely to make concessions and take home larger amounts. Contestants who announce that they will not back down do well relative to others, but they do not secure larger absolute amounts and they harm others. They find no evidence of a first-mover advantage and little evidence that demographic characteristics matter.

== Transmissions ==
Series	Start date	End date	Episodes
1	18 May 2009	26 June 2009	30
2	6 April 2010	7 May 2010	23

== International versions ==
Country	Title	Host	Network	Top Prize	First airdate
Afghanistan	ثانیه 100; 100 Sanya	Hafiz Mohammadi	Tolo TV	Af.1,000,000	8 June 2013
Albania	Per Vete	Edi Oga	Top Channel	1,500,000 leke	7 October 2013
(Arab League) Arab World	من الأحق؟ Men El Ahaq?	Amira El Fadl	Abu Dhabi TV	د.إ 1,000,000	5 October 2008
Canada (Quebec)	Chaque Seconde Compte	Julie Snyder	Noovo	N/A	8 January 2024
Chile	Divididos [es]	Álvaro Escobar	TVN	CL$75,000,000	March 2012
Denmark	Splittet	Camilla Ottesen	TV3	250,000 Danish kroner	8 April 2015
Estonia	100 sekundit [et] (Mondays)	Madis Milling	TV3	N/A	30 August 2010
Estonia	100 sekundit [et] (Mondays)	Madis Milling	TV3	N/A	3 January 2011
Estonia	60 sekundit (weekdays)	Madis Milling	TV3	120,000 krooni	4 October 2010
Greece	Divided	Fotis Sergoulopoulos	Alpha TV	€31,000	21 October 2019
Hungary	Cápák	Unknown (heard from speakers only)	TV2	26,250,000 Forint	25 August 2008
India (in Marathi)	Divided	Aadesh Bandekar	ETV Marathi	₹650,000	30 July 2012
India (in Kannada)	Divided	Rohit	Zee Kannada	₹1,000,000	3 January 2014
India (in Tamil)	Divided	Gopinath	Star Vijay	₹5,000,000	21 July 2018
Malta	Divided	Mariella Scerri	TVM	€80,000	1 October 2009
Netherlands (original version)	De Gemene Deler [nl]	Rinie van den Elzen	RTL4	€250,000	6 July 2008
Netherlands (original version)	De Gemene Deler [nl]	Beau van Erven Dorens	SBS6	€250,000	2012
Slovenia	Vse ali nič	Milan Gačanovič	TV 3	€10,000	4 October 2010
South Korea	퀴즈쇼 트라이앵글; Kwijeusyo teulaiaeng-geul	Nam Hee-suk	tvN	₩200,000,000	5 December 2010
Spain	Divididos	Luján Argüelles	LaSexta	€80,000	15 December 2020
Thailand	Divided คนไม่ยอมเกม	Sanya Kunakorn	Channel 3	฿380,000 (ep. 1–2) ฿530,000 (ep. 3–13)	27 January 2019
Turkey	Anlaşma	Ansi Elagöz	Türkmax	100,000 TL	20 September 2010
Ukraine	Хто вартий більшого? Khto vartyi bilshogo?	Andriy Dzhedzhula	Ukrayina	225,000 ₴	15 September 2013
United States	Divided	Mike Richards	GSN	$85,000 ($100,000 on 30 March 2017)	25 November 2016 ("Sneak Peek" episode); 19 January 2017 (series premiere)
Vietnam	Không thỏa hiệp	Đại Nghĩa	VTV3	300,000,000₫	14 July 2019 (Series premiere)
