= MK pop =

Musical subgenre from Hong Kong

MK Pop (an abbreviation for Mong Kok Pop) is a new Internet slang that has been frequently used in Hong Kong since 2014. The term describes a local music genre with strange dance style, exaggerated dress or imitates Korean and Japanese pop music. Inasmuch as MK pop singers have specific Mong Kok culture characteristics, including drawing black eyeliner, applying nail polish and putting on heavy makeup, people call them "MK". Apart from their exaggerated appearances, their dance moves are said to be weird and new-fashioned. Due to wide media coverage and Internet forum discussions, a hot debate over the degree of social acceptance of MK Pop is caused.

== Background ==
In recent years, there has been a growing popularity in Korean pop culture. Korean boy bands and girl groups, such as Super Junior, Girls' Generation and Big Bang, are acclaimed as pretty and handsome singers with slick dance routines and catchy tunes. With the rise of world tour and social media, like YouTube and Twitter, K-pop has broken into Hong Kong market and captured the minds and hearts of Hongkongers.

The recession of Hong Kong music industry is one of the main reasons that the Hong Kong people prefer pop music culture of foreign countries, rather than local music culture. There were not many stimulations and new elements of Cantopop in the past few years, though there were some fresh boy groups were introduced in the public eye in the early 2014. With the prevalence of K-pop, they are imitating Korean pop singers' overstated makeup. In addition to their appearances, their music style and performance are also highly similar to that of Korean boy groups. Apparently, MK Pop has now become a special icon in Hong Kong music industry.

== Examples of MK Pop singers ==
=== Bird of Paradise (BOP) ===
It is a dancing and singing boy group of Pan Asia Cultural Company, which debuted officially in March, 2014. There are three members in the group, who are Gordon, Lincoln and Tyree. Their average age is 22 years old. The group name "Bird of Paradise" is a florid, which means a kind, brave, courageous and pretty boy with dreams. Their debuted song "登陸太陽" has accumulated about 200,000 hit rates on YouTube. Most people comment that their eyeliner and heavy makeup are the peculiarities that arouse social attention.

=== Faith ===
It is a boy group which debuted in March, 2014. Three members are included in the group – Hiu Yong, Wave and Sky. All members in Faith are post-1990s. When their debut "Stop Peeping" released, 900,000 hit rates were attained. Their second song "Ma Ma Easy" also accumulated about 800,000 YouTube viewers. As there is a prevailing trend of K-pop in Hong Kong, they claim that they prone to take the style of K-pop stars as a reference and it is hoped that the general public can accept such a new element in Hong Kong music industry.

=== TENMUXIC ===
It is a Guangzhou singing boy group developed in 2009. There are two members in TENMUXIC, who are Parkson and Leandro. In March, 2014, they released a new song called "Kiss Kiss Kiss" on YouTube, which drew much attention from Internet users. Given that their style resembles that of K-pop, people therefore prone to comprise it into the category of "MK Pop".

== Social Debates ==
=== Pros ===
==== A Stimulation of Hong Kong Music Industry ====
It is said that the arise of MK Pop groups stimulates the local industry. Starting from the 2000s, Hong Kong music industry has been described as plain and uncreative. Many local music producers stick only to the 1980s-style songs. There is a continuous release of similar melody and highly repetitive music form in the market. As Wyman Wong, local lyricist, pointed out "Let alone their [MK Pop groups] unorthodox dance moves and melodies, their debuts introduce locals a new song genre", the popularity of MK Pop can in turn encourage musicians to bring in more new genres to the society.

=== Cons ===
==== A Business Strategy ====
The rise of MK Pop groups is one of the business strategies to maximize local entertainment companies' profit. Companies exploit 'Fast-food Culture' in Hong Kong, using unorthodox dance and music to create a fad(Ip, 2014). "The industry is profit-oriented. It puts little emphasis on long-term planning and training. MK Pop is not firm enough to last long" (Fei, 2014). For some companies, the intention of setting MK Pop groups is to have short-term return, but not developing a new genre.

==== Limitations of MK Pop Groups ====
First, the groups are too new to gain more sponsorships and gather more supporters. Second, MK Pop artists are being compared with Korean pop groups, in which their dancing proficiency is always criticized by others. Third, their budgets for styling and production are relatively tighter than other mainstream singers, which limit their development. Lastly, since MK Pop songs' contents are packed mainly with strong beats, it is believed that it is not easy for them to stand out from other songs. "These groups may need to instill more local collective memories to stand out" (Wong, 2014).
