= Milionář =

- Logo
- Created by: David Briggs; Mike Whitehill; Steven Knight
- Presented by: Roman Šmucler
- Country of origin: Czech Republic

Original release
- Network: TV Prima
- Release: 4 February 2008 – September 2008

Milionář (English translation: Millionaire) is a Czech game show based on the original British format of Who Wants to Be a Millionaire?. The show was hosted by Roman Šmucler. The main goal of the game was to win 2,000,000 Kč by answering 15 multiple-choice questions correctly. The show no Fastest Finger First round and the host will invited each contestants to the studio. There were 4 lifelines - fifty fifty (50:50), phone a friend (přítel na telefonu), ask the audience (rada publika) and switch the question (výměna otázky). The game show was shown on the Prima TV. When a contestant got the fifth question correct, he left with at least 10,000 Kč. When a contestant got the tenth question correct, he left with at least 80,000 Kč. Earlier, the game show was called Chcete být milionářem?.

== Payout Structure ==
Question number	Question value
Question number	(Yellow zones are the guaranteed levels)
1	1,000 Kč
2	2,000 Kč
3	3,000 Kč
4	5,000 Kč
5	10,000 Kč
6	20,000 Kč
7	30,000 Kč
8	40,000 Kč
9	50,000 Kč
10	80,000 Kč
11	160,000 Kč
12	300,000 Kč
13	500,000 Kč
14	1,000,000 Kč
15	2,000,000 Kč

== Big winners ==
No contestant won the top prize in this version. The biggest winner is Jiří Lener, who won 500,000 Kč on 7 March 2008.

=== 300,000 Kč winners ===
- Robert Chylík (18 February 2008)
- Čeněk Matocha (26 February 2008)
- Vratislav Šteiner (21 May 2008)
- Miroslav Štorch (13 June 2008)
- Laco Kajaba (23 June 2008)

=== 160,000 Kč winners ===
- Zdeňka Jírová (18 March 2008)
- Štěpán Molt (11 April 2008)
- Tomáš Zavázal (22 April 2008)
- Miroslav Keřka (5 May 2008)
- Vladimíra Vondráková (9 May 2008)
- Ivan Vasilev (13 May 2008)
- Jan Hošek (23 May 2008)
- Zdeněk Novák (19 June 2008)
