= 1 vs. 100 (American game show) =

2006–2008; 2010–2011 American TV game show

- Genre: Game show
- Based on: Eén tegen 100
- Written by: Rosemarie DiSalvo; Gary Lucy; Bob Stone; Chip Dornell; Scott Saltzburg; Aaron Solomon; Howard Kuperberg; Doug Shaffer; Ryan Hopak; Adam R. Markowitz; Terrence McDonnell; Jonathan Bourne
- Directed by: R. Brian DiPirro (NBC); Steve Grant (GSN)
- Presented by: Bob Saget (NBC); Carrie Ann Inaba (GSN)
- Narrated by: Joe Cipriano (NBC)
- Theme music composer: Anthony Phillips
- Country of origin: United States
- Original language: English
- No. of seasons: 3
- No. of episodes: 68

Production
- Executive producers: Scott St. John (NBC); Michael Canter (GSN)
- Producers: Evelyn Warfel; Megan Johnson; Neal Konstantini
- Production location: Manhattan Beach Studios
- Editors: Anthony Carbone; Pamela Malouf; Brian S. Phillips; Mark S. Andrew (NBC); Austin Flack; Vince Bruzzese; Stephen Cohen; Chad Dickman; Steven J. Escobar; Dan Morita; Mike Schwab (GSN)
- Running time: 41–43 minutes (2006–2008); 20–22 minutes (2010–11)
- Production company: Endemol USA

Original release
- Network: NBC
- Release: October 13, 2006 – February 22, 2008
- Network: GSN
- Release: November 15, 2010 – January 11, 2011

1 vs. 100 is an American game show that was broadcast by NBC from 2006 to 2008 and revived on Game Show Network (GSN) with a new series, which ran from 2010 to 2011. Based on the Dutch game show Eén tegen 100, the game features a single player (the "One") competing against 100 other contestants (known as "the Mob") in a trivia match, hence the show's title. The One accumulates prize money based on how many Mob members they have eliminated from the game, but loses all winnings with an incorrect answer at any point. The host of the original NBC version was Bob Saget, while Carrie Ann Inaba hosted the GSN revival.

== Gameplay ==
The game is played with the main contestant acting as "the One" answering questions against 100 other contestants collectively known as "the Mob". The Mob is generally made up of a mix of individual players and groups of players with a common background ("15 cheerleaders"; "10 banjo players"; etc.). The objective of the One is to be the last player standing, having eliminated all 100 members of the Mob from the game by correctly answering a series of general-knowledge questions.

To begin the game, a multiple-choice question is revealed with three choices labeled "A," "B," and "C," one of which is correct. Once all Mob contestants still in the game have locked in their answers, the One then answers the question. After the One picks an answer, the correct answer is revealed, after which all Mob members who answered incorrectly are eliminated from the game. The amount of money in the One's bank also increases by an amount based on the number of Mob members who answered incorrectly. The game continues as long as the One answers every question correctly. If the One eliminates all 100 Mob members, their winnings are augmented to $1,000,000. However, if the One answers incorrectly on any question, the game ends and the One forfeits all accumulated winnings up to that point. All Mob members who answered the last question correctly split those winnings equally. Mob members may stay on the show (even across multiple games) as long as they keep answering questions correctly.

For the first five episodes and after every correct answer, the One is given the choice to either walk away with their winnings or continue playing. In conjunction with the various changes made in the sixth episode, the One could only walk away after correctly answering the third question, the fifth question, and every question thereafter.

=== Helps ===
To assist the One, assistance from the Mob is offered in the form of "helps". Originally there were two helps, which could only be used in order. Starting with the sixth episode, a third option was added, the three helps were given names, and the One could choose any of the three at any point in the game. The helps were, in order:

- Poll The Mob: Originally known as the first help, the One selects one of the three answers to get more information about. The number of Mob members who chose that answer is revealed, and the One chooses one of the revealed Mob members to discuss their response.
- Ask The Mob: Originally known as the second help, two Mob members are randomly selected: one who answered correctly and one who answered incorrectly. Each explains their decision to the One, which in turn eliminates the third choice from consideration. Mob members must be honest about their choices, but may be deceptive about their reasoning for the choice. If all Mob members chose the same answer, only one Mob member is randomly selected and explains their decision, then the One may decide whether to go for the answer or not. If all Mob members split their choices among the two incorrect answers, only one Mob member is randomly selected and explains, then the host informs the One that all Mob members answered incorrectly (again eliminating one of the three choices from consideration), meaning that the contestant would win $1,000,000 upon giving a correct answer.
- Trust The Mob (added in episode six): The One is automatically committed to the answer chosen most frequently by the Mob; if there is a tie where at least two answers were chosen the most frequently, the One must choose between such answers.

After reaching a certain point in the game, the One can be given a "Sneak Peek", which allows them to see the next question (but not the three answers) before deciding whether or not to answer the next question. In season one, it was used when 90 or more members of the Mob have been eliminated; in season two, it became available once the One has exhausted all helps.

=== Payout structure ===
Originally, the One was awarded a cumulative amount of money after each individual question for each Mob member eliminated; this amount increased with each question as the game went on. For example, if eight members of the Mob were eliminated on the second question, the One would win $500 per member, adding up to $4,000 to the total. The payout structure was tweaked slightly prior to the third episode of the season and changed once again on the sixth episode in conjunction with introduction of the "Trust the Mob" help.

Question	Value		
Question	Episodes 1–2	Episodes 3–5	Episodes 6–20
13+	$10,000		
12	$10,000		$9,000
11	$9,000	$7,500	$8,000
10	$8,000	$6,000	$7,000
9	$7,000	$5,000	$6,000
8	$6,000	$4,000	$5,000
7	$5,000	$3,000	$4,000
6	$4,000	$2,000	$3,000
5	$3,000	$1,500	$2,000
4	$2,000	$1,000	$2,000
3	$1,000	$500	$1,000
2	$500	$250	$1,000
1	$100		$1,000

In the second season and on the GSN version, the payout structure was simplified to award the One for every tenth Mob contestant eliminated. Most other rules from season 1 were intact, including the option to leave the game on questions three and five onwards.

Mob members eliminated	Value			
Mob members eliminated	NBC (season two)	GSN (episodes 1–11)	GSN (episodes 12–33, 39–40)	GSN (episodes 34–38)
100	$1,000,000	$50,000		$100,000
90–99	$500,000	$25,000		$50,000
80–89	$250,000	$10,000		$25,000
70–79	$100,000	$5,000		$10,000
60–69	$75,000	$2,500	$4,000	$8,000
50–59	$50,000	$2,000	$3,000	$6,000
40–49	$25,000	$1,500	$2,000	$4,000
30–39	$10,000	$1,000	$1,500	$2,000
20–29	$5,000	$750	$1,000	
10–19	$1,000	$500		
Fewer than 10	$0			

== Production ==
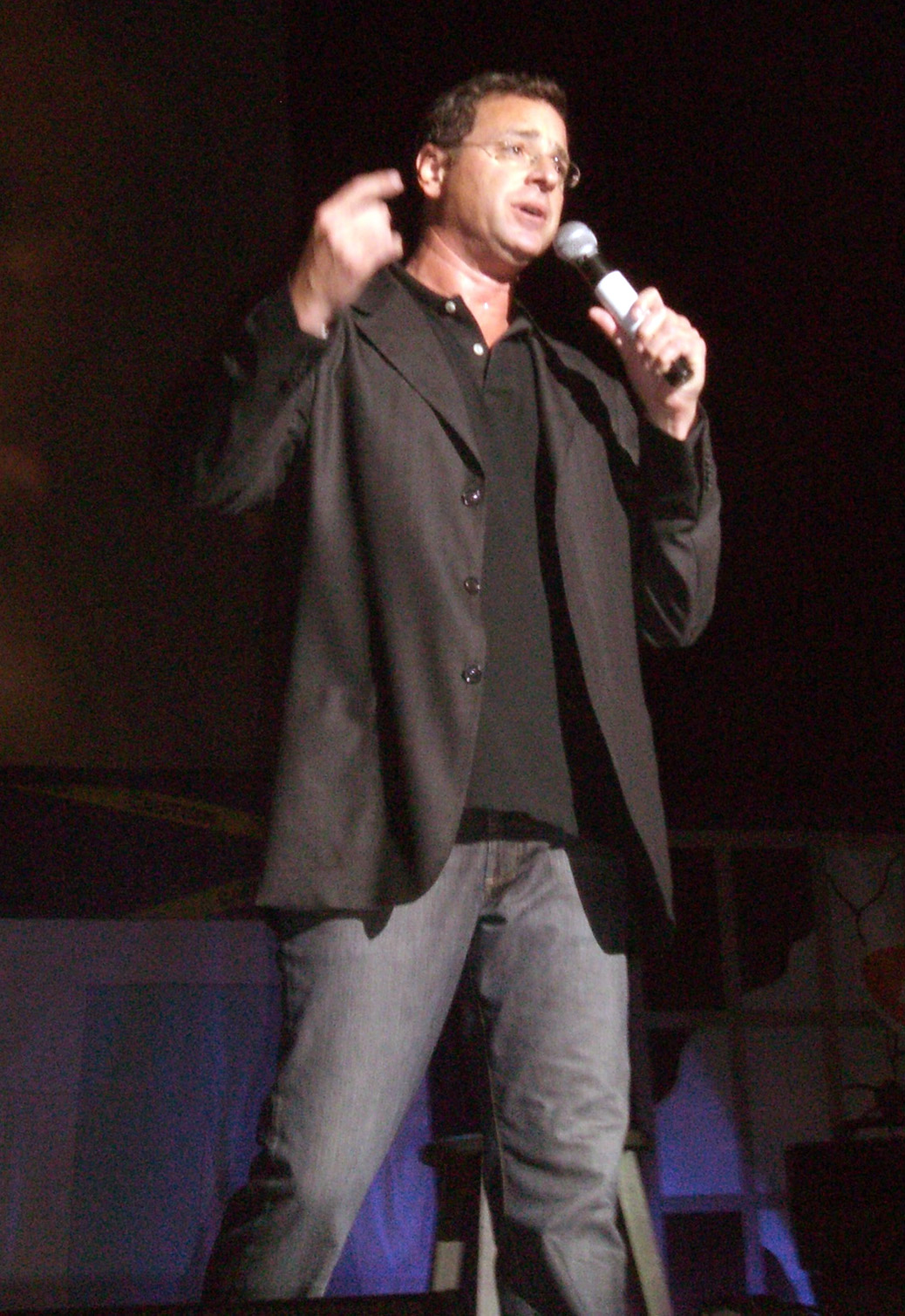
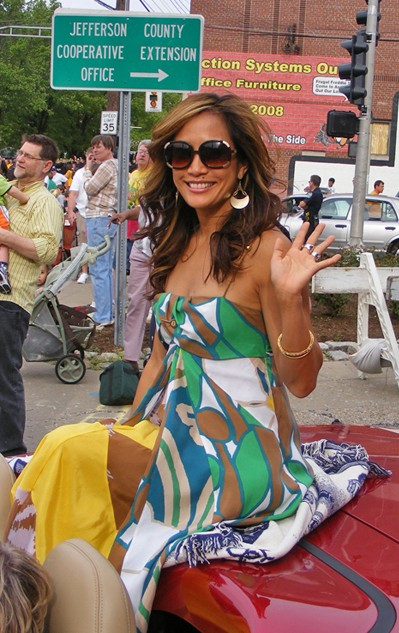
Bob Saget (left) hosted the NBC version, while Carrie Ann Inaba (right) hosted the GSN revival.

=== NBC ===
The show first premiered on NBC as a five-episode series on October 13, 2006. On October 20, 2006, it was reported that NBC ordered ten additional episodes of 1 vs. 100, citing the show's encouraging ratings performance. The series returned to NBC's schedule with these new episodes on December 1, 2006.

In May, NBC announced that 1 vs. 100 would return for a second season in Fall 2007 for an eight-episode run. The Singing Bee was originally scheduled to air after the initial run of 1 vs. 100, but its premiere was moved up to July to compete with Fox's new game show Don't Forget the Lyrics! In July, NBC announced some fall scheduling updates that included 1 vs. 100's season two premiere being temporarily delayed.

In late 2007, as a result of the 2007–08 Writers Guild of America strike, NBC announced that 1 vs. 100 would return as a winter replacement sometime in January, and the series debuted its second season on January 4, 2008, with a revamped new set and payout structure.

==== Special episodes ====
There were seven special episodes throughout the series:

- On an episode aired December 1, 2006, the top prize was briefly raised to $3,000,000 for the episode's first contestant. The episode also features several celebrities in the Mob, including game show hosts Wink Martindale and Bob Eubanks.
- A Christmas special aired on December 25, 2006. Christmas-related questions were answered in this episode, while the Mob were dressed with members in character representing "The 12 Days of Christmas".
- A kids edition was played on the February 2, 2007, episode in which the Mob consisted of entirely 100 children. The contestant lost $94,000 on a question ("What was a common feature (motto) relating to the Boy Scouts of America and Girl Scouts of the USA" – founder, motto or badge system; the correct answer was Motto; the contestant incorrectly answered badge system) and evenly split $18,800 to the last five (out of 20 remaining) children.
- On February 9, 2007, a special entitled "Last Man Standing" was aired, featuring a Mob consisting largely of former top Mob members (Sister Rose and Annie Duke) and game show champions (such as Jeopardy! veterans Brad Rutter and Ken Jennings, and Who Wants to Be a Millionaire $1,000,000 winners Nancy Christy and Kevin Olmstead), competing for a $250,000 prize money. Several rules were modified: no helps were given, the questions had no monetary value, and the "1" was not allowed to leave the game at any point; if the contestant was incorrect, they were eliminated from further play and replaced with another Mob member. The "1" was randomly selected from the Mob and the gameplay was thus 1 vs. 99; Duke was chosen to play as the "1." The $250,000 went to entertainment lawyer and former actor Larry Zerner, who was the only Mob member among the five remaining contestants (including Duke and Jennings) to correctly answer the question (The question was "Who has been married the most times? – King Henry VIII, Larry King, or 'King of Pop', Michael Jackson; Zerner correctly answered Larry King, while the rest incorrectly answered King Henry VIII).
- The season two premiere on January 4, 2008, was entitled "Battle of the Sexes," featuring a mob entirely of 100 members of the same gender, and the "1" was the opposite gender. This was also the first episode to use the revamped set and new payout ladder system. During this episode, the female contestant Katherine Kazorla played first, but lost $50,000 to the last of the 39 surviving male Mob members; the male contestant, Jason Luna, became the show's first (and only) contestant to beat all 100 female Mob members and won the $1,000,000 top prize (Luna's final question was "According to Hallmark, what is the biggest card-giving holiday of the year?" – Christmas, Valentine's Day or Mother's Day; Luna correctly answered Christmas while the last 15 female Mob members were incorrect).
- On January 25, 2008, Chris Langan participated in a special titled "Smartest Man in America". He eliminated 80 Mob members and chose to walk away with $250,000.

=== GSN repeats and revival ===
Game Show Network (GSN) began airing reruns of the show on June 6, 2009. With the ratings success of those shows in reruns, GSN announced a casting call in August 2010, implying that the network would be producing new episodes.

On October 13, 2010, GSN announced plans to premiere an original revival series, hosted by Dancing with the Stars judge Carrie Ann Inaba. The initial order of 40 half-hour episodes began airing weekdays on November 15, 2010. The Mob members participated via webcam, while the "1" plays for the top prize of $50,000 ($100,000 on some episodes). Contestants also only had two of the NBC version's helps available: "Poll the Mob" and "Trust the Mob". In addition, contestants were only given the option to leave the game upon reaching at least $1,000 on the prize ladder, while the "Sneak Peek" was not used until the contestant had reached at least $10,000.

The season finale of GSN's 1 vs. 100 aired on January 11, 2011. Inaba confirmed that she would not be returning to the series, leading to the show's cancellation.

== Reception ==
The series quickly became a ratings success for NBC, with the debut episode earning 12,800,000 viewers and a 4.2/13 rating/share among adults 18–49. Despite the high ratings, criticism emerged asserting that the questions tended to be far less difficult than those seen on other quiz shows. Slate's Troy Patterson noted: "Indeed, the only problem with 1 vs. 100 is its determined idiocy. The quality of the quiz is of no importance to the new breed of quiz shows. All that matters is the show of emotion—the contestant's joyful squeals, worried quivers, and relieved slumps." Brian Lowry of Variety added: "Endemol and NBC have managed the seemingly impossible — combining on a quiz/trivia show nearly as mentally undemanding as their no-skill-required hit Deal or No Deal the questions are so simple that amassing thousands isn't much harder than guessing which case to open."

Ray Richmond argued that while the series' format is "not a terrible game", it was easier than it was promoted to be: "While the idea of having one contestant take on 100 people in a game of trivia skill sounds on paper like a hugely challenging undertaking, in truth it probably is 100 times less challenging than Who Wants to Be a Millionaire because 1) the questions tend to be far less brainy, and 2) the competition ain't all it is cracked up to be." Ed Bark, a former television critic at The Dallas Morning News, gave the series a "C-minus" grade, calling it "another NBC big-money game show that really should be titled Dumb or Super-Dumb. How else to gauge the candle power required to answer the show's opening question: 'The 2003 movie Seabiscuit featured what kind of animal?'" The New York Times's Alessandra Stanley opined, "the point of 1 vs 100 is different: knowledge is beside the point."

== Merchandise ==
The success of the series inspired several home versions to be released. These included media home versions in the form of an interactive DVD game, a mobile app, a plug-and-play game, a version for the PC, a version for the Nintendo DS, and an interactive version for Xbox Live. Other home versions were a board game released by Pressman Toy Corporation, a card game published by Cardinal, and a 100-piece puzzle that formed a home version of the game once assembled.

In November 2021, it was reported by multiple gaming news outlets that Microsoft and AltSpaceVR, a virtual reality platform owned by Microsoft, were developing a new 1 vs. 100 interactive video game for Xbox. In 2021, journalist Jeff Grubb stated that the game was in active development. As of 2025, no further updates have been released.
