= 1 vs. 100 (2008 video game) =

2008 video game

- Box art
- Developer: ECi
- Publisher: DSI Games
- Director: Stefan Pavelka
- Producer: Shared Chaturverdi
- Programmers: Malek Belhadj; Radoslav Marusa
- Artist: Richard Loukota
- Platform: Nintendo DS
- Release: NA: July 3, 2008
- Genre: Game show
- Modes: Single-player, multiplayer

1 vs. 100 is the Nintendo DS adaptation of the game show of the same name developed by British studio ECi, in which a single contestant competes against an audience "mob" of 100. The game was released on July 3, 2008.

== Gameplay ==
Gameplay screenshot

The game's rules are identical to the game show's: A question is posed, and both the single contestant and members of the "mob" must guess at the answer. If the contestant gets the question wrong, the game is over and the prize money is split up amongst the mob. If the contestant gets the answer right, members of the mob who got the question wrong are eliminated, and the value of each question goes up for the solo player as the mob thins out. The contestant can opt to quit with their winnings at any time, or press their luck and continue on. Bob Saget, as with the televised show, is the game show host.

== Reception ==
Reception

Aggregate score
Aggregator	Score
Metacritic	38/100

Review scores
Publication	Score
GameZone	2/10
IGN	4.5/10

Critical reception of 1 vs. 100 was generally negative. One universal complaint is the game's small question database, which results in many repeated questions. Reviewers also criticised the game for not giving the player incentives to score well, such as unlockable rewards or score records. IGN noted that "You can opt out to 'take the money' after each round but doing so just leads back to the main menu. The money just disappears: there are no unlocks of any kind or any reason to take the money." Long delays between questions were the cause of further grievances. Non-gameplay elements, such as graphics and sound received a mixed reception.

== See also ==
- 1 vs. 100 (Xbox 360)
