= Angélique Beldner =

Swiss television presenter

- Born: 8 January 1976 (age 50); Switzerland
- Other names: Angélique Beldner-Wälchli
- Occupations: Radio and television journalist
- Employer: SRF

Angélique Beldner (born 8 January 1976) is a Swiss radio and television journalist and presenter.

== Biography ==
Beldner did an apprenticeship as a typographer. She then attended drama school and in 1999 worked at Radio Förderband in Bern. From 2002 to 2004, she worked for Radio SRF Virus. After a stay abroad and a job in the communications industry, she became editor-in-chief at Radio Canal 3 in Biel in 2006. In 2008, she switched to Radio SRF, where she worked as an editor and presenter. She has been working for SRF television since 2015, where she presents the lunchtime and evening editions of SRF Tagesschau on SRF 1.

Since January 2020, Beldner has been presenting the quiz program 1 gegen 100, replacing Susanne Kunz as the main presenter.

== Personal life ==
Beldner is married and has two sons.
