= Divided (American game show) =

American television quiz show (2017–2018)

- Genre: Game show
- Based on: Divided by: Aurélien Lipiansky; Clément Gayet
- Directed by: Rob George
- Presented by: Mike Richards
- Country of origin: United States
- Original language: English
- No. of seasons: 2
- No. of episodes: 105

Production
- Executive producers: John de Mol; Jay Bienstock; Michael Canter
- Running time: 20−22 minutes
- Production company: Talpa Media USA

Original release
- Network: Game Show Network
- Release: January 19, 2017 – May 8, 2018

Divided is an American television game show broadcast by Game Show Network (GSN) based on the British series of the same name. Each episode consists of four contestants playing as one team who must agree on answers to questions they are given. The longer it takes the team to come to an agreement, the less money the team earns for each question. The series, hosted by Mike Richards, premiered January 19, 2017, and concluded May 8, 2018.

Some critics believed that the show's name and timing were appropriate given the tumultuous preceding presidential election and its premiere date coming the day before the inauguration of Donald Trump.

== Gameplay ==
Each episode consists of three rounds. A team of four contestants starts the game; one player is eliminated after two rounds of play. For each question, the team has 60 seconds to unanimously agree on an answer (excluding the final round), the available money decreases the longer it takes. Each contestant must enter the same response on their respective panel and then everyone must simultaneously lock in an answer and stop the clock. If the team answers the question correctly, they bank whatever money is left on the clock, if they are wrong, or if time runs out, their bank is reduced by half.

The first round consists of three questions. Each question has one correct answer, and the opening value is $5,000. After the first question has been played, the team is afforded two "takeovers" to use in the rest of the game. To use a takeover, one contestant presses a smaller red button (yellow in season one) in front of them, their answer is then considered to be the team's answer — which still need(s) to meet the requirements of the question.

In the second round, there are again three questions. Each question starts with a value of $10,000 and has two correct answers, the team must select both correct answers in order to get credit. After the second round, the contestants secretly vote on which of them will be eliminated from further play. In order to eliminate a contestant, the other three must agree unanimously. If there is no unanimous agreement, then the contestants are given a 15-second grace period (10 seconds in season one) before their bank begins to drain. In the second season, instead of just changing their votes, the votes were wiped clean, allowing everyone to re-vote. Once there is a unanimous agreement, the chosen contestant is eliminated from the show with no winnings.

On rare occasions in which the team has earned no money by the elimination vote, the same 15-second grace period applies for three members of the team to agree on who to eliminate. However, since there is no money to lose thereafter, if the team cannot agree on who to eliminate after 15 seconds, the studio audience votes to eliminate one of the team members instead.

The third round consists of two questions. In season 1, the first required the team to rank three answers in a stated order and started with a value of $15,000. The second had an opening value of $25,000 and 1, 2, or all 3 of the answers could have been correct; the contestants had to select all correct answers, and only the correct answers in order to get credit. Starting in season 2, the $15,000 question has two or all three answers being correct, and the team must select all of the correct answers, and only the correct answers, the $25,000 question requires the team to rank the three answers in the correct order.

=== Final round ===
The money is divided into three unequal shares. The "A" share is 60% of the team's bank, the "B" share is 30%, and the "C" share is 10%. The team has 100 seconds (1:40) to agree on who should receive which share. Once the clock starts, the money begins to drain away at a rate of 1% of each contestant's share. Each contestant must claim a different share, and the team must lock it in to stop the clock and claim the remaining money. If after 50 seconds, no agreement is made, the clock stops briefly, and each contestant, in turn, is given 10 seconds to explain which share they feel they deserve and why. Once each player has pleaded their case, the clock restarts and the money continues to drain. If no agreement is reached, all three contestants leave the show with no money. If all questions are answered correctly, the top prize is worth up to $51,000 (60% of the maximum total bank of $85,000).

== Production ==
A sneak preview of the series aired on November 26, 2016. Mike Richards, executive producer of The Price Is Right and Let's Make a Deal and former host of GSN's The Pyramid, was chosen to host the show, and the series officially premiered January 19, 2017, an hour before the season four premiere of GSN's Idiotest. When asked about choosing the premiere date for the show, GSN's Executive Vice President of Programming, Amy Introcaso-Davis, said "Divided is informed by the fractured social landscape, which in turn, reflects the political divide in this country....launching Divided so close to the inauguration, much like a question in the show, was hotly debated! Ultimately we agreed it was a good time to show that although people have many disagreements, it is to everyone's benefit to unite." On March 14, 2017, GSN renewed Divided for a second season, with a two-episode premiere on August 15, 2017. On March 30, 2017, a special edition of the show aired with three contestants instead of the usual four, resembling the format on the original British series. During this episode, no mid-game elimination was held. Instead, another $15,000 question was added in the third round.

After a hiatus midway through Season 2, on April 3, 2018, new episodes of the show were moved to a 3:30 AM EST death slot. Despite this, reruns that cycled through the show remained in early time slots for an additional four years until the show was removed entirely from the Game Show Network schedule in October 2022. On-demand episodes are now found exclusively on streaming service Pluto TV.

== Reception ==
Nellie Andreeva of Deadline Hollywood argued that the series was appropriate for its time, noting how the series premiere "arrive[d] as the nation ha[d] been left deeply divided by a bruising Presidential campaign and election. That was not lost on GSN executives as they worked on the series." The New York Times's Neil Genzlinger agreed, contending, "It's tempting to see the show, which seems to bring out the obstinance and belligerence of its contestants, as being born of the fractious period the United States has just been through... it certainly fits perfectly in the current landscape."

The November preview episode received 275,000 viewers and a 0.07 18–49 rating. The actual series premiere saw a sizeable rise in the ratings, with the 9:00 p.m. and 9:30 p.m. EST episodes performing relatively well by GSN's standards, earning 421,000 and 451,000 viewers respectively. On February 23, 2017, the show hit a series high with 500,000 viewers and a 0.13 18–49 rating.
