= High School Reunion (TV series) =

- Genre: Reality television
- Created by: Mike Fleiss
- Presented by: Mike Richards
- Country of origin: United States
- Original language: English
- No. of seasons: 6

Production
- Production locations: Hawaii, U.S.
- Production companies: Next Entertainment; Telepictures Productions (seasons 1–3); Warner Horizon Television (seasons 4–6); TV Land Productions (season 4); TV Land Prime Original Production (seasons 5–6)

Original release
- Network: The WB; TV Land
- Release: January 5, 2003 – March 3, 2010

High School Reunion is a reality television series chronicling real-life high school reunions. Premiering on The WB on January 5, 2003, and airing for two seasons between 2003 and 2005, the series featured reunions of classes after twenty years. Filmed in Maui, the series featured documentary-style interviews with the classmates, who are assigned "labels" to describe their high school roles.

A revived version of the series began airing on TV Land on March 5, 2008, focusing on the 20-year reunion of the 1987 graduating class of J. J. Pearce High School in Richardson, Texas. The series returned to TV Land in February 2009 with members of the Class of 1988 of Chandler High School in Chandler, Arizona reuniting and the promise that one of them would reveal a major secret. Once again class members had labels such as "The Class Clown", "The Cowboy", etc. The series returned with its third season premiering on January 13, 2010. It follows the members of the Class of 1989 of Chaparral High School in Las Vegas, Nevada.

== Series overview ==
=== 1987 classmates ===
Lana and Mike were married after high school, but they later divorced. After the break-up, Lana had an affair with one of Mike's friends, Steve. Lana said in the first episode she came to the reunion to make peace with Mike. Meanwhile, DeAnna and Justin, Sean and Kirstin, and others, develop feelings for each other.

- DeAnna, the popular girl
- Justin, the pipsqueak
- Kat, the lesbian
- Sean, the millionaire
- Cheryl, the outsider
- Jason, the bully
- Yvette, the girl next door
- Matt, the jock
- Heather, the heart-breaker
- Steve, the backstabber
- Kirstin, the spoiled girl
- Glenn, the geek
- Lana, the drama queen
- Mike, the rebel
- Rob, the stud

=== 1988 classmates ===
- Andrew, The Band Geek
- Chad Ramirez, The Cowboy
- Dennis, The Troublemaker
- Heather, The Preacher's Daughter
- Jenny LaFlesch, The Cheerleader
- Jessica Frantz Garvin, The Ugly Duckling
- Kara Hoffman Breeze, The Homecoming Queen
- Liz, The Wannabe
- Lynette, The Snob
- Manny, The Player
- Maricela Vallecillo, The Outcast
- Octavia, The Flirt
- Renee, The Goody Goody
- Scott Horne, The Loner
- Scott Schutkowski, The Class Clown
- Scott White, The Skate Punk
- Shalonda Warren Clark, The Pregnant Girl
- Tom Breeze, The Jock
- Tyrone, The All-Star

=== 1989 classmates ===
- Antanus Pullum, The Ladies' Man
- Cyndi Ellis-Stueben, The Nerd
- Elena Machin, The Popular Girl (Summer Girl)
- Eric (Raven) Lowell, The Gay Guy
- Jodi McMillin Jorjorian, The Cheerleader
- Joe Basso, The Football Star
- John Mikolainis, The Troublemaker
- Justin Taggart, The Delinquent (Valley High)
- Lissette Jefferies-Waugh, The Hot Girl (Summer Girl)
- Lori Da Silva, The Party Girl
- Marcel Chevalier, The Prankster (Valley High)
- Mark Kasel, The Secret Admirer
- Rachelle Ramirez-Smith, The Late Bloomer
- Tracy Barkhuff, The Teacher's Pet
- Tracey Ealy, The Jock
- Treda Edwards Ealy, The Class Sweetheart
