= Alla mot en =

Swedish game show

- Genre: Game show
- Presented by: Rickard Sjöberg
- Country of origin: Sweden
- No. of seasons: 2

Production
- Producers: Novamedia and Meter Film & Television
- Production location: Gothenburg
- Running time: 60 minutes (2004); 30 min (2005) (including commercials)

Original release
- Release: 3 January 2004 – 27 May 2005

Alla mot en ("Everybody against one") was a Swedish game show that aired for two seasons on TV4, based on the Endemol format 1 vs. 100.

It was based on one person competing against 100 audience members for a cash prize.

In January 2004, TV4 moved the long-running Bingolotto from the Saturday slot it had occupied since 1991 to early Saturday evening. The early Saturday evening would then be used for Alla mot en. The first season, the show was also affiliated with Bingolotto, meaning that the 100 competing audience members were selected through the Bingolotto lottery and they would also win several prices such as cars and travels. The second season, the show was affiliated with Sverigelotten, a part of Bingolotto.
