= Greggy Soriano =

American YouTuber and cake designer

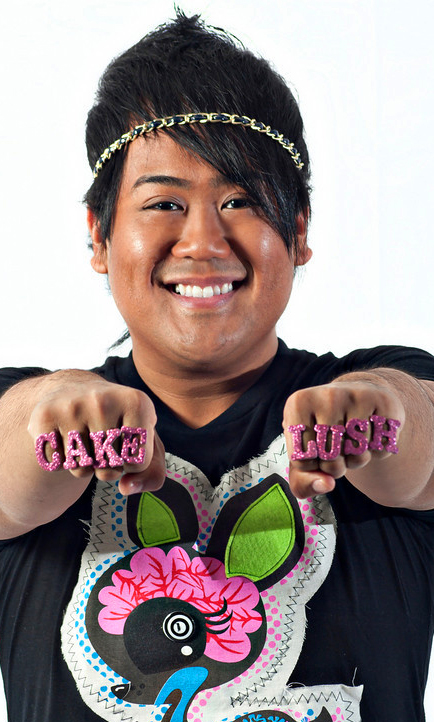
- Born: August 19, 1984 (age 41); Glendora, California, United States

Gregory Paul Soriano also known as Greggy Soriano, is a YouTuber, content creator, chef, and cake designer. He is the star of the reality television show, Cakezilla on TLC (Asia), which premiered on July 25, 2018. He is known for being in the first season of Cake Boss: Next Great Baker on TLC. He was cast as "Greggy, The Self Proclaimed Gaysian" on Beauty and the Geek Season 5 on The CW Television Network.

== Early and personal life ==
Soriano, a Filipino American, was born in Glendora, California. He spent his childhood in Azusa, California. He was a member of the performing group The Young Americans, He attended Hyde Park, New York campus of the Culinary Institute of America. He currently lives in Jersey City, New Jersey.
