= Rickard Sjöberg =

Swedish journalist, television presenter and game show host

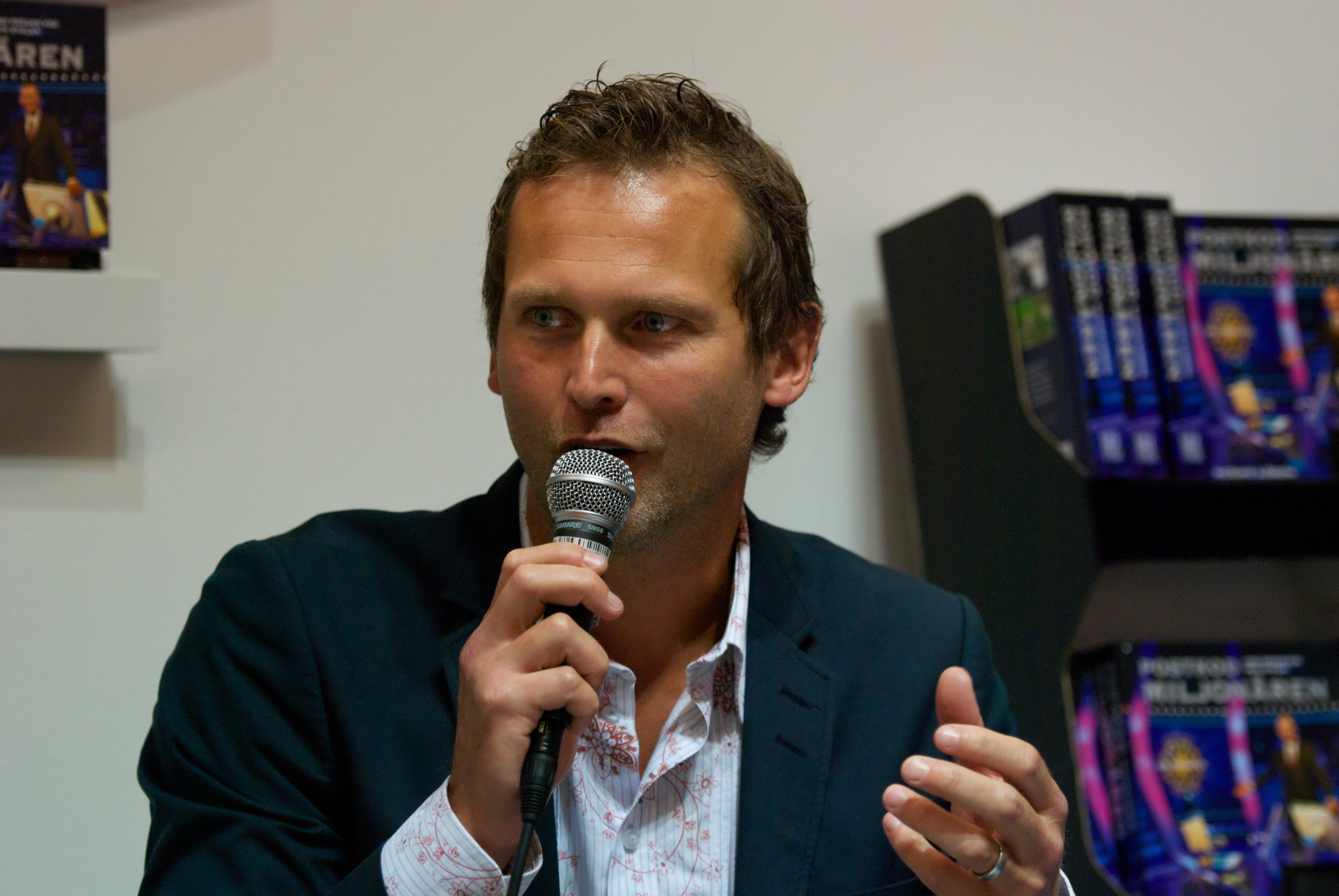
- Rickard Sjöberg (2011)
- Born: 12 August 1969 (age 57); Södertälje, Sweden
- Occupation: Television presenter
- Height: 1.99 m (6 ft 6 1/2 in)

Per Rickard Arvid Sjöberg, (born 12 August 1969) is a Swedish journalist, television presenter and game show host. Since 2005 he is the presenter of TV4's Postkodmiljonären. Sjöberg was born in Södertälje but grew up in Tyresö, between 1991 and 1994, he studied journalism at Södra Vätterbydgens folkhögskola in Jönköping. He started his career at SVT's local office in Jönköping in the summer of 1993. The same year he moved over to TV4 where he was employed as a reporter and presenter of the then newly started local station TV4 Sydost in Växjö.

Sjöberg has been a television presenter for När & fjärran at TV4 and Alla mot en.
