= 1 vs. 100 (Hong Kong game show) =

Hong Kong game show

- Chinese: 以一敵百; 1 Tegen 100
- Genre: Game show
- Created by: Endemol
- Presented by: Wyman Wong
- Country of origin: Hong Kong
- No. of episodes: 60 regular + 1 special

Production
- Camera setup: Multiple-camera setup
- Running time: 60 minutes (special); 30 minutes (regular) (with commercials)

Original release
- Network: ATV Home
- Release: September 24 – December 15, 2006

The Hong Kong version of 1 vs. 100, called 以一敵百 (lit. "to oppose 100 people by 1 person"), was produced by Asia Television and it is the first Chinese language version of the show. It was first broadcast as a 1-hour special on September 24, 2006 where the contestants were winners of at least HK$30,000 on Who Wants to Be a Millionaire?, then it was aired every weeknight between September 25, 2006 and December 15, 2006. It was hosted by lyricist Wyman Wong (黃偉文).

== Gameplay ==
The format of the show is based on the original Dutch version, Eén tegen 100. At the beginning, The One (阿一) is randomly selected from a group of 101 players and the other 100 people will become The Hundred (阿百).

Before each question is shown, the category of the question is revealed first, and the One can choose between two difficulty levels, Normal (一般) and Difficult (困難). After the question and the three options are shown, The Hundred is given 6 seconds to lock in their answer, then The One is given the opportunity to answer the question. If The One is correct, all opponents that got the question wrong are eliminated. The prize gained in The One's bank is based on the following formula:

$$\text{Prize gained}=\left [ \frac {\textrm {HK}\$200\,000} \text{No. of opponents} \right ] \times \text{No. of wrong answers}$$

Where $[\ ]$ means integer part.

There is a ×2 doubler for The One which doubles the prize gained on a question. After The One has gained some money, three "escapes", 25, 50 and 75, which allows The One not to answer the question, can also be used in order. The opponents who got that wrong are still eliminated, but The One earns nothing on that question. Instead, 25%, 50% and 75% of the amount in The One's bank is deducted respectively. The One is not allowed to bail out at any point of the game.

If The One has eliminated all of The Hundred, The One wins the amount in the bank. If The One is incorrect, he or she is out of the game and loses the prize in the bank. But unlike other versions, a consolation prize is awarded, which depends on the number of opponents eliminated without using escapes:

No. of opponents eliminated without using escapes	Consolation prize (HK$)
1 to 20	2,000
21 to 40	4,000
41 to 60	6,000
61 to 80	8,000
81 to 99	10,000

When The One has completed the game successfully, the next One is chosen from all of The Hundred. If The One failed, the next One is chosen from those who got the last question right. If there are no survivors, one of all 100 opponents plays next.

The biggest possible winnings for The One is HK$1,237,431 (about US$159,000), which can be reached when The One answers 100 questions correctly, eliminates only 1 opponent on each question without using any escapes and uses the doubler on the last question. However, the biggest winnings record of the show is HK$603,933 (about US$77,800) only, which is less than half of that amount.

== List of winners ==
Throughout the series, 11 people had eliminated all mob members, 9 of them are listed as follows:

Episode	Airdate	Name	Prize won (HK$)	Source
Special	September 24, 2006	Louis Hung (孔令慈)	25,225	
3	September 27, 2006	Wong Ka-chun (黃家俊)	132,821	
6	October 2, 2006	Elvis Chan (陳劍豪)	403,746	
21	October 23, 2006	Mabel Kwan (關佩玲)	439,088	
27	October 31, 2006	April Fong (方心如)	412,562	
29	November 2, 2006	So Chung-kwai (蘇宗葵)	87,840	
35	November 10, 2006	Mandy Hon (韓燕雯)	414,049	
38	November 15, 2006	Steven Ng (伍耀泉)	603,933	
52	December 5, 2006	Lam Chun-yin (林俊言)	408,311	

== Scheduling and ratings ==
Episode viewing figures from CSM Media Research.

Episode	Airdate	Timeslot (HKT)	Average ratings points	Equivalent number of viewers	Source
Special	September 24, 2006	Sunday 8:00 – 9:00 p.m.	6 (max. 7)	385,560 (max. 449,820)	
1–5	September 25 to 29, 2006	Mon – Fri 9:30 – 10:00 p.m.	5	321,300	
6–10	October 2 to 6, 2006	Mon – Fri 9:30 – 10:00 p.m.	5	321,300	
11–15	October 9 to 13, 2006	Mon – Fri 8:30 – 9:00 p.m.	5	321,300	
16–20	October 16 to 20, 2006	Mon – Fri 8:30 – 9:00 p.m.	5	321,300	
21–25	October 23 to 27, 2006	Mon – Fri 8:30 – 9:00 p.m.	5	321,300	
26–30	October 30 to November 3, 2006	Mon – Fri 8:30 – 9:00 p.m.	5	321,300	
31–35	November 6 to 10, 2006	Mon – Fri 8:30 – 9:00 p.m.	5 (max. 6)	321,300 (max. 385,560)	
36–40	November 13 to 17, 2006	Mon – Fri 8:30 – 9:00 p.m.	5	321,300	
41–45	November 20 to 24, 2006	Mon – Fri 8:30 – 9:00 p.m.	4 (max. 5)	257,040 (max. 321,300)	
46–50	November 27 to December 1, 2006	Mon – Fri 8:30 – 9:00 p.m.	4	257,040	
51–55	December 4 to 8, 2006	Mon – Fri 8:30 – 9:00 p.m.	4 (max. 5)	257,040 (max. 321,300)	
56–60	December 11 to 15, 2006	Mon – Fri 8:30 – 9:00 p.m.	4	257,040	

== See also ==
- Deal or No Deal (Hong Kong), a game show produced by ATV's competitor TVB in the same year
