= Beauty and the Geek =

Reality television franchise

- Created by: Ashton Kutcher
- Original work: Beauty and the Geek (United States)
- Owner: Banijay Entertainment
- Years: 2005–present

Beauty and the Geek is a reality television franchise that first aired in the United States.

The show follows groups of "Beauties" (people — almost always women — who rely on their attractiveness and outgoing personalities but typically lack intellect) and "Geeks" (people — almost always men — who rely on their intellect, but typically lack social ability) who must pair up to compete in challenges to avoid elimination.

While a competition, the show is also billed as a social experiment, in which each contestant typically learns from his or her teammate. The geeks help beauties prepare to compete in challenges of intellect and the beauties prepare the geeks to compete in challenges involving social skills.

== International versions ==
Currently airing franchise
Franchise no longer in production

| Country | Name | Host(s) | TV station | Premiere | Finale |
|---|---|---|---|---|---|
| Australia | Beauty and the Geek Australia | Bernard Curry | Seven Network | October 8, 2009 | November 27, 2014 |
| Australia | Beauty and the Geek Australia | James Tobin | Seven Network | October 8, 2009 | November 27, 2014 |
| Australia | Beauty and the Geek Australia | Sophie Monk | Nine Network | July 11, 2021 | August 3, 2022 |
| Bulgaria | Красавицата и отличникът Krasavitsata i otlichnikat | Borislav Lazarov | bTV | October 3, 2005 | November 29, 2005 |
| Chile | La Bella y el Geek | Pablo Mackenna | Chilevisión | October 22, 2012 | December 17, 2012 |
| Colombia | La Bella y el Nerdo | Víctor Gómez | Canal Caracol | May 4, 2006 | ? |
| Croatia | Ljepotice i genijalci | Igor Mešin | Nova TV | March 18, 2019 | May 6, 2019 |
| Denmark | Skønheden og nørden | Thomas Hartmann | TV3 | February 13, 2006 | ? |
| Estonia | Kaunitar ja geenius | Evely Ventsli | TV3 | September 3, 2006 | 2006 |
| Finland | Kaunotar ja nörtti | Lauri Salovaara | MTV3 | September 4, 2005 | ? |
| France | Bimbos et Intellos | Laurent Ournac | TF1 | Cancelled | |
| Germany | Beauty & The Nerd | Daniel Boschmann | ProSieben | January 31, 2013 | February 21, 2013 |
| Germany | Beauty & The Nerd | – | ProSieben | June 4, 2020 | present |
| India | [V] Beauty and the Geek | Andy Kumar | Channel V | March 19, 2011 | June 5, 2011 |
| Israel | היפה והחנון; HaYafa VeHaChnun | Pini Tavger | Channel 10 | July 23, 2008 | April 7, 2014 |
| Israel | היפה והחנון; HaYafa VeHaChnun | Micheal Hanegbi | Channel 10 | July 23, 2008 | April 7, 2014 |
| Italy | La pupa e il secchione | Enrico Papi; Federica Panicucci | Italia 1 | September 7, 2006 | October 23, 2006 |
| Italy | La pupa e il secchione | Enrico Papi; Paola Barale | Italia 1 | April 18, 2010 | June 7, 2010 |
| Italy | La pupa e il secchione | Paolo Ruffini; Francesca Cipriani | Italia 1 | January 7, 2020 | May 3, 2022 |
| Italy | La pupa e il secchione | Andrea Pucci; Francesca Cipriani | Italia 1 | January 7, 2020 | May 3, 2022 |
| Italy | La pupa e il secchione | Barbara D'Urso | Italia 1 | January 7, 2020 | May 3, 2022 |
| Italy | La pupa e il secchione | Enrico Papi | Italia 1 | April 10, 2024 | May 10, 2024 |
| Netherlands; Belgium (Flanders) | Beauty & de Nerd | Renate Verbaan; Mathias Coppens; Bridget Maasland | RTL 5 VTM | 2006 | 2009 |
| Netherlands; Belgium (Flanders) | Beauty and the Geek | Bram Krikke; Robin Hölzken-Krikke | Amazon Prime Video | 2025 | present |
| Mexico | La Bella y el Nerd | Michel Gurfi | TV Azteca | August 20, 2007 | November 26, 2007 |
| Norway | Prinsessen og professoren | Jasmin Aasland | TV3 | March 9, 2006 | April 27, 2006 |
| Portugal | A Bela e o Mestre | José Pedro Vasconcelos and Iva Domingues | TVI | March 11, 2007 | May 13, 2007 |
| Russia | Красавицы и Умники; Krasavitsy i Umniki | Alexander Anatolyevich and Irina Grigorieva | REN TV | December 20, 2005 | February 21, 2006 |
| Russia | Чики и фрики Chiki i friki | (original US show) | MTV Russia | 2010 | ? |
| Spain | Nadie es Perfecto | Jesús Vázquez | Telecinco | July 5, 2007 | August 14, 2007 |
| Turkey | Güzel ve Dahi | Behzat Uygur | Show TV | July 7, 2007 | July 28, 2007 |
| Ukraine | Гламурні штучки та заучки Hlamurni shtuchky ta zauchky | Gregory Herman | 1+1 | October 21, 2010 | December 29, 2010 |
| United Kingdom | Beauty and the Geek | David Mitchell | E4 | February 7, 2006 | March 14, 2006 |
| United Kingdom | Beauty and the Geek | Matt Edmondson; Mollie King | Discovery+ | September 25, 2022 | November 6, 2022 |
| United States | Beauty and the Geek | Brian McFayden | The WB | June 1, 2005 | May 13, 2008 |
| United States | Beauty and the Geek | Mike Richards | The CW | June 1, 2005 | May 13, 2008 |

In Brazil, the original American show aired on the cable television network Multishow under the title As Gostosas e os Geeks (The Hotties and the Geeks).
