= Lily Hanson =

American comedian

Lily Jo Hanson
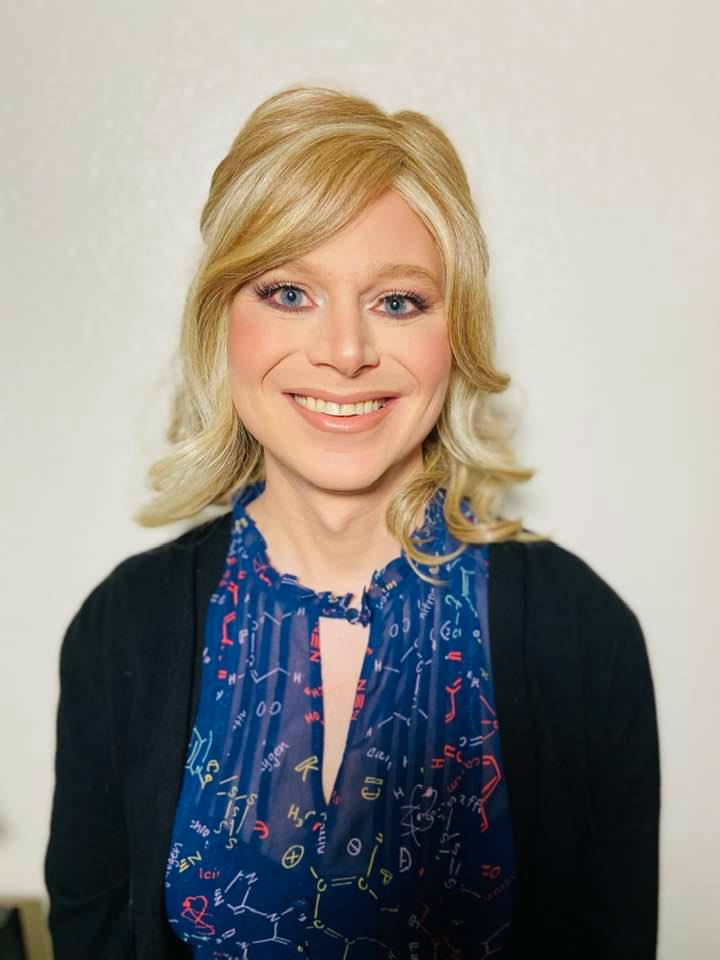
- Hanson in 2021
- Born: Fosston, Minnesota, United States
- Occupations: Comedian, host, rapper, writer, YouTuber

Lily Jo Hanson (born Joe Hanson) is a writer and comedian living in Los Angeles and is best known for her work on Current TV, Smash Cuts, and Joe Goes.

== Early life ==
Hanson grew up in Fosston, Minnesota, she graduated from the University of Chicago with a degree in English.

== Career ==
Note: Hanson's media appearances from 2005 to 2017 were then credited as Joe Hanson.

Hanson's first television appearance was in 2005, in the first season of the show The Beauty and the Geek, resulting in Hanson and partner Erika being eliminated in the second episode.

In 2005, Hanson's production partner Hassan S. Ali created the Joe Gets series for Current TV, which spanned 50 episodes and was sponsored by T-Mobile. The series involved Hanson exploring fish-out-of-water situations, like trips to California, Indiana, Nevada, Missouri, South Dakota, Alabama and New York state. Hanson also made the satirical series What's Wrong With, the music video parody "Viral Superstar", and interviewed celebrities at Elton John's Oscars afterparty.

In 2008, Hanson started "Bino White Weekly" making a rap song every week as Bino White. The topics ranged from Nintendo to Twitter to science, and each track was accompanied by a YouTube video. Hanson did this for 54 weeks, breaking Crooked I's record for weekly rap songs.

In 2009, Hanson joined the cast of Smash Cuts, a syndicated clip show on The CW and CBS affiliates.

In 2010, Hanson started the web-series Joe Goes, visiting various conventions, events, and countries to interview people. The episode "Joe Goes To Exxxotica Expo" went viral, making the front page of the Huffington Post, and getting over 550,000 views combined on YouTube and Funny Or Die. Other episodes have included visits to Anime Expo, Amsterdam, London, Bangkok, Finland and the press junket for Tron: Legacy. The show featured many people of note including Olivia Wilde, Michael Sheen, Sheryl Lee Ralph, Kumail Nanjiani, Beau Garrett, Sean Patrick Flanery and Bruno Kohfield-Galeano.

Hanson has also appeared in March 2012 in the music video for the song by Julian Smith on YouTube "Eat Randy" featuring as "Randy".

She was mentioned as a writer for Ray William Johnson's Equals three.

On October 5, 2017, Hanson announced an indefinite hiatus from the YouTube series Joe Goes. Hanson was absent from virtually all aspects of public life for over three years, causing fans of the series to speculate about her health, career, and identity. On March 3, 2021, Hanson uploaded a video to the Joe Goes channel, explaining the reasons for her departure from YouTube and confirming her identity as a trans woman. She also confirmed that the series Joe Goes is over and that she has settled into a writing career.
