= Mike Richards (television personality) =

American television personality and producer

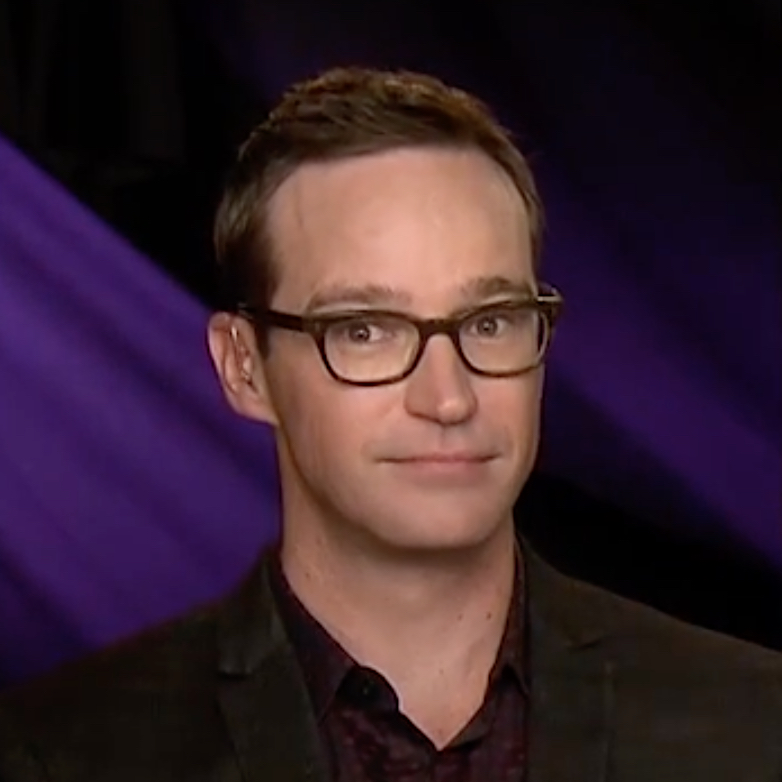
- Richards in 2017
- Born: July 5, 1975 (age 51); Burbank, California, U.S.
- Education: Pepperdine University
- Occupations: Television personality; Producer
- Years active: 1997–2021, 2025–present
- Television: Executive producer of Let's Make a Deal and The Price Is Right (2009–2019); Executive producer of Wheel of Fortune and Jeopardy! (2020–2021), President and Chief Content Officer of The Daily Wire (2025–present), CEO (as of May 20, 2026)
- Spouse: Stephanie Richards
- Children: 2

Michael Richards (born July 5, 1975) is an American businessman and former television producer, game show host, and television personality. He was most notably the executive producer of the American television game shows Let's Make a Deal and The Price Is Right from 2009 to 2019, and of Jeopardy! and Wheel of Fortune from 2020 to 2021. Richards also hosted other television series including High School Reunion, Beauty and the Geek, Pyramid, and Divided, and was the executive producer of Who Wants to Be a Millionaire in 2020.

In August 2021, Richards briefly succeeded Alex Trebek as host of the daily syndicated version of Jeopardy! after Trebek's death in 2020. However, Richards resigned as host later that month due to criticism over offensive comments that he had made on The Randumb Show podcast, as well as wrongful termination and sexual harassment lawsuits from models during his time as the executive producer of The Price Is Right. Richards hosted only a week's worth of episodes, which aired in September 2021 as part of the show's 38th season.

On May 20, 2025, it was announced that Richards would join The Daily Wire and would become its president and chief content officer (CCO) following the exit of former president Jeremy Boreing in March 2025. Richards would become the CEO of The Daily Wire on May 20, 2026, exactly one year after he joined the company.

== Early life ==
Richards was born on July 5, 1975, in Burbank, California, and attended Pepperdine University.

== Career ==
=== Early career ===
Richards began his career in college, where he created, wrote, produced, and hosted a weekly late-night comedy talk show called The Randumb Show at Pepperdine University. The show featured celebrity guests including Kim Fields, Casey Kasem and Anson Williams. Richards went on to intern for The Tonight Show with Jay Leno. Between 1996 and 2003, he regularly performed stand-up comedy in Los Angeles.

Richards was the second host of Beauty and the Geek and produced numerous game shows, including Weakest Link. He later hosted seasons of High School Reunion on The WB.

During his early career, Richards was vice president of development and current programs for Dick Clark Productions. He hosted the daily movie news show Dailies for three years and served as a correspondent for the American Music Awards and the 2005 Dick Clark's New Year's Rockin' Eve.

=== CBS: The Price Is Right and Let's Make a Deal ===
From 2009 to 2019, Richards was the executive producer of The Price Is Right and Let's Make a Deal. He was also a candidate to host The Price Is Right in 2007 before Drew Carey was chosen. He fired announcer Rich Fields and held on-air auditions, similar to the ones he later used on Jeopardy!, to hire George Gray as Fields' replacement. Richards also dismissed longtime producer, and longtime friend of Bob Barker, Roger Dobkowitz. Richards often neglected Deal and was frequently absent from day-to-day operations. A post-producer was fired after sarcastically making an introduction that drew attention to Richards' absences.

Beginning in 2013, Richards hosted a podcast, The Randumb Show, which was promoted as a look at the production of The Price is Right. The Ringer reported that Richards, "repeatedly used offensive language and disparaged women's bodies". In 2021, the Anti-Defamation League criticized his disparaging stereotyping of women, Jews, Asians, and the disabled on the podcast and called for an investigation, after which Richards apologized for the material and took the podcast offline.

Richards was the subject of two wrongful termination lawsuits from models on The Price Is Right; one lawsuit was by Brandi Cochran, who alleged that CBS and FremantleMedia discriminated against her by firing her after she became pregnant with twins, and another was by Lanisha Cole, who claimed that Richards and fellow producer Adam Sandler (not to be confused with actor and comedian Adam Sandler) berated her in front of her peers and wrongfully terminated her. The Hollywood Reporter stated that Richards made a disparaging comment about Cochran's pregnancy at a 2008 party, and that Richards claimed she was fired because he thought that she "would not take us to great."

=== GSN: The Pyramid and Divided ===
Richards hosted GSN's 2012 revival of The Pyramid and the network's American version of Divided, which aired on the network from 2017 to 2018.

=== Sony Pictures Television: Jeopardy! and Wheel of Fortune ===
Richards left The Price is Right and Let's Make a Deal in 2019 and joined Sony Pictures Television, where he was assigned to the ABC primetime return of Who Wants to Be a Millionaire as an executive producer alongside host Jimmy Kimmel and Michael Davies for the nine-episode first season of the show during the 2019–20 season. Richards also served as the executive producer for the 2021 GSN revival series of Chain Reaction. For the 2020–21 season, Richards succeeded Harry Friedman as the executive producer of Jeopardy! and Wheel of Fortune.

After Jeopardy! host Alex Trebek died on November 8, 2020, Richards appeared at the start of the November 9 episode to pay tribute to him. Richards later filled in for two weeks as a guest host of the show, with his first episode airing on February 22, 2021. On August 4, it was reported that Richards had entered "advanced negotiations" to become the permanent host, though with other candidates still in contention. After that announcement, a lawsuit filed against Richards and others during his tenure as the executive producer of The Price Is Right resurfaced, causing controversy. On August 11, it was announced that Richards would succeed Trebek as host of the daily show, with the Jeopardy! guest host, actress Mayim Bialik, hosting future prime-time specials and spinoffs. However, nine days later, it was announced that Richards would step down after offensive comments he had made in the past emerged. It was also alleged that he had multiple conflicts of interest while participating in the host selection process. The five episodes Richards filmed the previous day, the show's first day of production on the new season, aired in September to kick off the show's 38th season.

Richards initially remained executive producer of Wheel of Fortune and Jeopardy! after resigning as host, with the backing of Sony Pictures and the head of its television division, Ravi Ahuja. However, on August 31, a week and a half after Richards resigned as permanent host, he was fired as executive producer of both shows. Michael Davies from Embassy Row served as interim executive producer for Jeopardy! following Richards's departure, (Note: Despite claims that Michael Davies would serve as an interim executive producer of Wheel of Fortune after Mike Richards' departure, he never actually assumed that role, with the show's senior producer Steve Schwartz serving as an uncredited interim executive producer for the rest of the show's 39th season before settling with Bellamie Blackstone in the 40th season.) and on April 14, 2022, was announced to be taking the role full-time. On March 23, 2022, it was announced that Bellamie Blackstone would take over the executive producer role for Wheel of Fortune. Bialik and Ken Jennings were eventually chosen as co-hosts for the syndicated version of Jeopardy! on July 27, 2022, with Jennings eventually being named the sole host in December 2023.

In a March 2024 interview with People magazine, Richards revealed that after being fired, he spent a lot of time with family reflecting on what happened due to hate his family received in the wake of the controversy over his past behavior. Richards also revealed that he was also working on packaging and selling more shows at the time.

=== The Daily Wire ===
On May 20, 2025, it was announced that Richards would join The Daily Wire and would become president of Daily Wire entertainment and would also become its chief content officer (CCO). This comes following the exit of former co-CEO Jeremy Boreing in March 2025. Richards is expected to work out of The Daily Wire's headquarters in Nashville, Tennessee. Exactly one year later, on May 20, 2026, The Daily Wire announced that Richards had become its CEO, replacing Caleb Robinson, who had become CEO when Boreing stepped down.

== Personal life ==
Richards and his wife, Stephanie, have two sons.

== Filmography ==
Year	Title	Role	Notes
2003	The Other Half	Himself	1 episode
2004	Primetime New Year's Rockin' Eve 2005	Correspondent	
2004	New Year's Rockin' Eve 2005	Correspondent	
2006–2008	Beauty and the Geek	Host	31 episodes
2006–2008	Dallies	Host	23 episodes
2008	High School Reunion	Host	4 episodes
2009–2013	The Bold and the Beautiful	Thad/Interviewer	2 episodes
2012	The Pyramid	Host	40 episodes
2013	The 40th Annual Daytime Emmy Awards	Himself	
2016	The 43rd Annual Daytime Emmy Awards	Himself	
2017	WGN Morning News	Himself	1 episode
2017	The Talk	Himself	1 episode
2017	Hollywood Today Live	Himself	1 episode
2017	Divided	Host	105 episodes
2017	Home & Family	Himself	2 episodes
2018	The 45th Annual Daytime Emmy Awards Red Carpet Live	Himself	
2018	The 45th Annual Daytime Emmy Awards	Himself	
2018	Cover Story	Himself	1 episode
2018	Unsung Hollywood	Himself	1 episode
2020–2021	Jeopardy!	Host	15 episodes, also executive producer
2020–2021	Entertainment Tonight	Himself	2 episodes
2020–2021	Today	Himself	2 episodes
2021	GMA3: What You Need to Know	Himself	1 episode

== Accolades ==
Year	Award	Work	Result
2011	Daytime Emmy Award for Outstanding Game/Participation Show	The Price Is Right	Nominated
2012	Daytime Emmy Award for Outstanding Game/Participation Show	Let's Make a Deal	Nominated
2013	Daytime Emmy Award for Outstanding Game Show	Let's Make a Deal	Nominated
2013	Daytime Emmy Award for Outstanding Game Show	The Price Is Right	Won
2014	Daytime Emmy Award for Outstanding Game Show	The Price Is Right	Nominated
2014	Daytime Emmy Award for Outstanding Game Show	Let's Make a Deal	Nominated
2015	Daytime Emmy Award for Outstanding Game Show	The Price Is Right	Nominated
2016	Daytime Emmy Award for Outstanding Game Show	Let's Make a Deal	Nominated
2016	Daytime Emmy Award for Outstanding Game Show	The Price Is Right	Won
2017	Daytime Emmy Award for Outstanding Game Show	The Price Is Right	Nominated
2017	Daytime Emmy Award for Outstanding Game Show	Let's Make a Deal	Nominated
2018	Daytime Emmy Award for Outstanding Game Show	Let's Make a Deal	Nominated
2018	Daytime Emmy Award for Outstanding Game Show	The Price Is Right	Won
2019	Daytime Emmy Award for Outstanding Game Show	The Price Is Right	Nominated
2019	Daytime Emmy Award for Outstanding Game Show	Let's Make a Deal	Nominated
2020	Daytime Emmy Award for Outstanding Game Show	The Price Is Right	Nominated
2021	Daytime Emmy Award for Outstanding Game Show	Jeopardy!	Won
2022	Writers Guild of America Award for Quiz and Audience Participation	Jeopardy!	Nominated
