= Roman Šmucler =

Czech dentist, oral surgeon, specialist in laser and photonics medicine (b.1969)

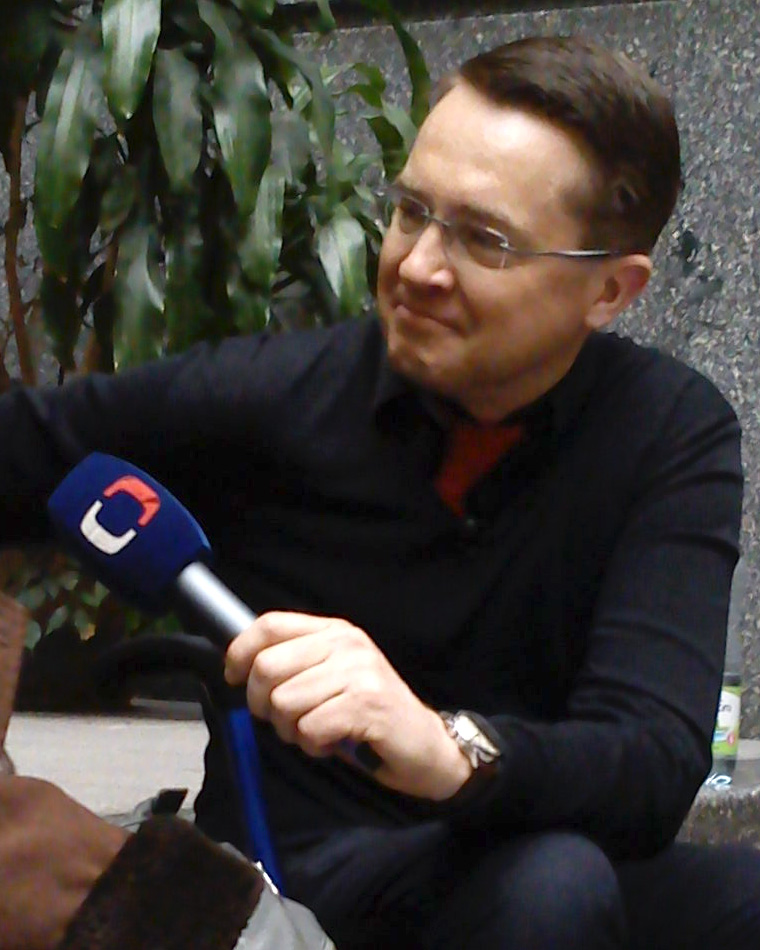
- Born: 8 June 1969 (age 57)
- Occupations: Oral surgeon, Lecturer, Entrepreneur, TV presenter and Scriptwriter

Roman Šmucler, MD, CSc (born 8 July 1969) is a Czech dentist, oral surgeon, specialist in laser and photonics medicine, university lecturer, entrepreneur, TV presenter, and scriptwriter.

== Early life and education ==
He grew up in Příbram, where he attended elementary and high school. He began contributing to local newspapers when he was ten years old. In 1986 he won second place and in 1987 he won first and second place in a national literary contest. In 1987 he was admitted into the First Faculty of Medicine in Prague, studying Stomatology. In the spring of 1989 he won a casting call to a Czech radio program called Microforum together with Robert Tamchyna and Martin Ondráček. He became a member of the team at the new federal station E+M. In November 1989, he participated in the revolutionary broadcasts during the Velvet Revolution, started presenting Microforum and contributing to the program Microforum Night Service. Since 1991 he has regularly presented Studio Contact in Czech Television and occasionally has been a presenter for other programs, such as Miss Czechoslovakia in 1992 and 1993.

== Medical career ==
Following his graduation in 1992, he started working at the Clinic of Stomatology at the First Faculty of Medicine and the General University Hospital in Prague, where he works today. He is also the current chief physician of the Center for Medical Photonics where he lectures in English.

In 1995 he passed the first postgraduate examination and in 2002 the second postgraduate examination in Stomatology. In 2002, he also obtained a Candidate of Sciences degree (CSc.). He qualified in the First Faculty of Medicine at Charles University in Prague in the field of Stomatology by presenting his thesis entitled The Therapeutic Use of Laser in Orofacial Oncology. He became an associate professor on 1 February 2010.

He has also been working at the Faculty of Medicine, Plzeň, where he researches the possibilities of treatment of oncological diseases with lasers.

He cooperates with the New York University College of Dentistry, and works at the Institute of Oncology and Rehabilitation Na Pleši.

He has participated in research fellowship programs in: Boston, Paris, Uppsala, Seoul, New York City and Vienna. He is a member of a range of Czech and international expert associations, where he also holds various positions. These include: SPIE, the American Society for Laser Medicine & Surgery (ASLMS), the American Academy of Implant Dentistry (AAID), the American Academy of Cosmetic Dentistry (AACD), ELA, and ESAD. The chief focus of his research is the application of lasers. Among other things, since 1996 he has been working on the committee of the Czech Medical Laspi Association with the Czech Medical Association of J.E. Purkyně, where he formerly held the position of secretary for science. He has been a chair for this organization since 2013. The name was changed to the Czech Medical Laspi Association so that it could further develop the new field of aesthetic medicine. He also engages in research in the fields of dental implants and dentoalveolar surgery. To date he has published 60 original and synoptic scientific papers. He has co-authored five research projects, mentors postgraduate students, and is dedicated to the popularization of science. He has written 112 articles and co-authored monographs, as well as television and radio programs requiring his expertise. He has delivered 152 lectures, 59 of which were given abroad. In 2016 he became a member of the scientific board the IMCAS Academy (which deals with the interface of plastic surgery and dermatology), in Paris.

2023 - Harvard Medical School "Leading Digital Transformation in Health Care" course.

2025 -Harvard Medical School course "AI in Health Care: From Strategies to Implementation"

== Career in media ==
On 4 February 1994 he presented the first live broadcast of TV Nova and subsequently programs The Nod, Why?, Tabu, 1 against 100. He was the author of Tabu, which was also screened abroad. He also appeared on programs such as The Golden Cage, Miss of the Decade, New Year's Eve Show and others. He left TV Nova in 2005. For six months in 2008 he accepted an offer to present the TV show Millionaire at TV Prima. In 2013, he resumed his work as a presenter for the Microforum Night Service at Czech Radio 2 and in collaboration with Czech Television he initiated preparations for the program The Brightest Czech. In 2016 Czech Television aired the second season of The Brightest Czech.

== Entrepreneurship ==
Since 1992, he has been producing television programs under a business license. In 1996, he founded Asklepion-Lasercentrum Praha s.r.o. This company operates a non-state medical facility which has grown from the first Czech center specializing in laser aesthetic medicine into a multi-field institute of aesthetic medicine. The main clinic is in Prague with branches in Karlovy Vary and Mariánské Lázně. The company has taken part in establishing medical facilities that were later sold to other organizations (Prague, Ostrava), or those that were developed primarily for other fields. About 40% of the clientele seeking treatment comes from abroad. It also runs a few surgeries abroad too, e.g. in London. Gradually other subsidiary companies specializing in business, medical training, and cosmetics production have been established. In 2008, the firm bought an equity stake in the Institute of Oncology and Rehabilitation Na Pleši, s.r.o., which had been created a year earlier through privatisation. In the same year, through Asklepion SG Hospital, s.r.o. (together with SUDOP Group – a partner of Asklepion in the Na Pleši facility) it gained a majority stake in the Municipal Hospital Mariánské Lázně, which after a few years it sold off. At present it has targeted the majority of its investments in the development of new medical procedures and products.

== Politics ==
On 23 July 2009 Šmucler became the leading candidate for the political party TOP 09 in the Karlovarský district for the canceled October general elections. In January 2010, he asked that his name to be removed from the top position on the list of candidates due to time-related matters.

In July 2024, he defended Russia, claiming that it certainly did not commit a missile attack on a children's hospital in Kiev. This statement sparked massive public criticism.

== Family ==
He was married to Libuše Šmuclerová, the general director at Ringier Česká Republika, who was formerly the CEO at TV Nova. They are divorced. They have one daughter Justine-Anna, who was born in 2001. He remarried in 2015, his second wife is Ing. Iva Šmuclerová, banker HSBC associate. He also has a niece by the name of Stela.

== Awards ==
In 2009, together with Prof. MD. Jiří Mazánek DrSc., and Dr. Marek Vlk, he was awarded the prize for medical research of 2008. He has been awarded prizes for giving speeches at foreign medical congresses and repeatedly nominated in viewer polls. In 2005, he came second in ANNO and TýTý polls. In 2015 he was an honorary member of the Society for Aesthetic and Laser Medicine of the Czech Medical Society of Jan Evangelista Purkyne. 2021 he was awarded with Honorary medal of honor of the Society for Aesthetic and Laser Medicine of the Czech Medical Society of Jan Evangelista Purkyne. 20.10.2022 he was Awarded with die Ehrennadel der deutschen Zahnärzteschaft from Bundeszahnärtzekammer and Bayerische LandesZahnärtzte Kammer 25.4.2023 Ambassador Award from Lord Mayor of Prague (candidacy WDC FDI). .
