= 1 vs. 100 (2009 video game) =

- Developer: Microsoft Game Studios
- Publisher: Microsoft Game Studios
- Composer: Anthony Phillips
- Platform: Xbox 360
- Release: WW: November 19, 2009
- Genre: Game show
- Mode: Multiplayer

1 vs. 100 was a massively multiplayer online game show video game developed and published by Microsoft Game Studios for Xbox 360, and an adaptation of the trivia game show of the same name.

== Summary ==
The game came in two variations: 1 vs. 100 Live and 1 vs. 100 Extended Play. The Live version was hosted by Chris Cashman in North America and James McCourt in the UK and Ireland, and places a single contestant as "The One" against a group of 100 that make up "The Mob", with the rest of the players making up "The Crowd". The One has the opportunity to win up to 10,000 Microsoft Points, credited to their Xbox Live account, while the remaining members of The Mob divide up the winnings and each win an Xbox Live Arcade game if they are able to eliminate The One. The top three players in The Crowd win the XBLA game as well.

The hosts and players were represented by Xbox Live Avatars. The game was free to all Xbox Live Gold subscribers and was supported by advertising revenue. Seasons lasting 13 weeks consisted of various 30-minute extended play sessions followed by live two-hour episodes airing Tuesday and Friday (Fridays and Saturdays during the first season).

Season 2 of 1 vs. 100 began on November 19, 2009 in France, Germany, the United States and Canada, and on November 20, 2009 in the United Kingdom and in the Republic of Ireland.

On July 15, 2010, Microsoft confirmed that 1 vs. 100 would not return for a third season.

On November 11, 2021, multiple gaming news outlets have started reporting rumors saying a revival of the game was in development, according to journalist Jeff Grubb, who claimed on his Giant Bomb show that the game was in active development at AltspaceVR, which was part of Microsoft's Mixed Reality division.

== Gameplay ==
Winnings
Mob left	The One	The Mob
100-91	0	0
90-81	160	0
80-71	300	0
70-61	600	0^{†}
60-51	800	0^{†}
50-41	1,200	0^{†}
40-31	2,000	80^{†}
30-21	3,000	160^{†}
20-11	5,000	400^{†}
10-1	6,000	800^{†}
0	10,000	N/A
^{†} Along with the top three members of "The Crowd", surviving mob members also received an Xbox Live Arcade game. Due to gaming laws, players in CT, IA, MD, VT, or Quebec were ineligible for prizes.

At the beginning of each 1 vs. 100 Live round, a player is selected as "The One" and 100 players are selected to be "The Mob". Everyone else remains in "The Crowd". Selection is based on weekly, round, and season (lifetime) score.

The game's rules are nearly identical to the game show's: a question is posed, and both The One and The Mob must select an answer from three choices. If The One gets the question wrong, the game is over and the prize money is split up amongst The Mob. If The One gets the answer right, members of The Mob who got the question wrong are eliminated. The payout goes up for every tenth member of The Mob eliminated. The One can opt to quit with their winnings at various intervals, or press their luck and continue on.

The Live version adds the notion of "The Crowd", which allows hundreds of thousands of players to compete alongside The Mob and The One. The top three members of The Crowd win an Xbox Live Arcade game. The Crowd represents one of the three "helps" available to the one, which can be used at any time to lock in their answer. If The One fails to answer the first three questions, the helps are automatically used. The helps are:

- Trust the Mob - The One's answer becomes whatever the majority of The Mob answered.
- Trust the Crowd - The One's answer becomes whatever the majority of The Crowd answered.
- Trust the Top 10 - The One's answer becomes whatever a majority of the 10 top scoring players in the current round answered from the crowd or mob. (In the first season, this was known as "Trust the Brain" which took the answer from the top performing player)

The better a member of The Crowd does, the better chance they have of being selected to be a part of The Mob or The One. Selection is based upon statistics for speed, accuracy, and the number of questions answered for that week. A player can only be chosen as The One once per season and as a member of The Mob once per Primetime episode. Each season gives players an opportunity to earn another 200 gamerscore.

As host of 1 vs. 100 Live, Chris Cashman/James McCourt is represented by an Xbox Avatar.

=== Extended Play sessions ===
The Extended Play version eliminates The One and the crowd and simply has all players compete as a member of The Mob of limitless size. It is typically a 30-minute show with 37 total questions. While there are no prizes during Extended Play, a player's participation contributes to the chance that they will be selected to join The Mob, or be The One during the next Live episode. Players are able to submit questions to be considered for inclusion in the Extended Play mode of the game via a web interface.

== Development ==
Manuel Bronstein, director of 1 vs. 100 for Microsoft Studios, describes the game as the realization of Microsoft's "vision for programmatic interactive experiences" delivered via Xbox Live Primetime. The game was due to be released in November 2008 with the "New Xbox Experience" update but it was delayed (as was the rest of the planned Primetime content). While fairly simple in visual appearance, Bronstein explained that the game was in development for more than a year because of technical hurdles, noting that making sure "hundreds of thousands of people see the host and answer the questions at the exact same time and handling prizes and all the things associated with cheating made for an interesting technical challenge."

Bronstein commented that Microsoft met with the producers of the popular television game shows American Idol and Survivor before partnering with Endemol and choosing 1 vs. 100 "because of its social elements." Joerg Bachmaier, senior VP of digital media for Endemol said "We see [the Xbox Live version] as a replication of the show on another platform... Except now it's more active. Nobody is just sitting back and watching."

Microsoft has stated that the first season of the game would be a "pilot season". Future seasons were dependent upon the success of the show's ability to generate advertiser revenue. Sprint and Honda each paid around $1 million to become primary sponsors of the first season and Microsoft is trying to sell additional one-off or occasional commercial spots.

A company named Ex Machina delivered the technology and services to help run the massive multiplayer trivia quiz application for Xbox Live. This included a special content management system (or "CMS") was created that supported the game content such as the questions and answers, all required metadata and multimedia items. Based on the individual results from each individual players' leaderboards were created in real-time.

An open beta was made available to Canadian subscribers with a gold subscription from May 8 through May 24, 2009. The open beta was re-opened and extended to subscribers in the USA on June 1, 2009. Though it was still in beta, on July 10, Microsoft began awarding actual prizes in the North American beta (previously players testing the game simply earned entries into a sweepstakes). They also confirmed that the beta season that commenced June 1 would last 13 weeks. The beta season for both the US and Canada ended on August 31, 2009.

The open beta for the United Kingdom began on July 10, 2009, and both Germany and France began on July 12, 2009.

Based on input from the first season, changes were incorporated into the game for the second season. The player selected as "The One" was found to receive a plethora of messages when they were playing, and thus in the second season, "The One" had their online status set to "Busy", preventing these messages from distracting the player. "The One" also entered the virtual set in a more dramatic fashion.

== Reception ==
Yahoo Games reported they "found it very hard to put down the controller" in a play test offered to the press and said while it may not necessarily "revolutionise primetime entertainment ... given the right kind of publicity, Microsoft could really have a winner on its hands.". Mike Krahulik and Jerry Holkins of the Penny Arcade gaming webcomic both commended the game for its authentic game-show atmosphere and its natural-feeling extension of social avatar-based gaming, compared with the perceived flaws in Sony's PlayStation Home service.

The game was downloaded over 2.5 million times, and its success has led Microsoft to extend its beta season for two additional weeks. Microsoft claims that the North American version of the game surpassed the Guinness world record for "most contestants in a game show" with over 114,000 simultaneous players.

== Possible revival ==
With the release of the Xbox Series X and Series S console line in 2020, Xbox head Phil Spencer said there was a strong interest in bringing back 1 vs. 100 given the success of trivia apps like HQ and Microsoft was looking into how that would work in the current environment. Microsoft's AltspaceVR team was rumored that they were working on a 1 vs. 100 video game as of November 2021, based on the same technology developed for online meeting applications, with support from Xbox Game Studios.
