= Wyman Wong =

Hong Kong lyricist

- Born: 21 May 1969 (age 57)
- Occupation: Lyricist

Chinese name
- Traditional Chinese: 黃偉文
- Simplified Chinese: 黄伟文
Transcriptions
Standard Mandarin
- Hanyu Pinyin: huang2 wei3 wen2
Yue: Cantonese
- Jyutping: wong4 wai5 man4
- Musical career
- Origin: Hong Kong
- Genre: Cantopop

Wyman Wong (born 21 May 1969) is a Cantopop lyricist from Hong Kong. His works are characterised by puns and other word plays, always pushing the boundaries in both style and content. Previously, he worked as a DJ at Commercial Radio Hong Kong. He has acted in films and hosted the Hong Kong version of television show 1 vs 100, and is a fashion columnist, and fashion consultant and designer, notably designing costumes for Eason Chan's Duo concerts.

== Filmography ==
Filmography as actor includes:

- Knock Off (1998)
- The Lion Roars (2002)
- The Mummy, Aged 19 (2002)
- I Love Hong Kong (2011)
- Golden Chicken 3 (2014)
- 12 Golden Ducks (2015)
- Sons of the Neon Night (2019)
