= Celebrity Fifteen to One =

- Also known as: Celebrity 15 to 1
- Genre: Quiz show
- Created by: John M. Lewis
- Presented by: William G. Stewart (1990, 1992); Adam Hills (2013–2015)
- Voices of: Jennie Bond (2013–2015)
- Country of origin: United Kingdom
- Original language: English
- No. of episodes: 12

Production
- Running time: 45 minutes (1990, 1992); 60 minutes (2013–2015)
- Production companies: Regent Productions (1990, 1992); Remedy Productions and Argonon (2013–2015)

Original release
- Network: Channel 4
- Release: 27 December 1990 – 28 August 2015

Related
- Fifteen to One

Celebrity Fifteen to One is a celebrity version of the Channel 4 game show Fifteen to One. William G. Stewart presented the first two episodes, which were Christmas specials that aired on 27 December 1990 and 30 December 1992. Adam Hills has hosted subsequent episodes on 20 September 2013, 6, 13, 20 and 27 June 2014, a Christmas special on 23 December 2014 and 7, 14, 21 and 28 August 2015.

Richard Whiteley, Anna Raeburn, Sally Jones and Rory McGrath appeared on both 1990s episodes, with Alex Brooker, Jimmy Carr, Johnny Vegas, Rhod Gilbert and Gyles Brandreth also having made appearances on more than one Hills episode. Of these, Brandreth is the only person to have made appearances on episodes presented by both hosts.

== Episodes ==
=== William G. Stewart era ===
The first episode was broadcast on 27 December 1990. The format is largely the same as that of Fifteen to One, though with the Barry Cryer rule: Those who get both questions wrong may still play round 2 with one life remaining, with Cryer being the only one to miss both questions. Cryer was also the first contestant to be eliminated. The programme is extended to 45 minutes from 30, with an extra advert added between the first and second rounds.

Contestants
Richard Whiteley	Nicholas Parsons	Barry Cryer	Jayne Irving	Claire Rayner	Jan Leeming	David Hamilton	Anna Raeburn	Carol Vorderman	Bob Holness	Nigel Rees	Sally Jones	Rory McGrath	Matthew Parris	Nicholas Owen

A second celebrity special aired on 30 December 1992. In his book "A Matter of Facts: An Insider's Guide To Quizzing", contestant Marcus Berkmann, who had previously appeared on a civilian episode of the show two years prior, explained that he was asked to appear on the programme after Vincent Hanna pulled out and noted that "clearly some barrels had been scraped for this, and [he] was at the bottom of the very last barrel". The winner, Patrick Stoddart, won by taking a step back from the rest of the semi-circle, resulting in no one nominating him in round 2. This would be the last Celebrity Fifteen to One for over twenty years.

Contestants
Rory McGrath	Lionel Blair	Jim Bowen	Matthew Kelly	Sue Carpenter	John Inman	Judi Spiers	Richard Whiteley	Gyles Brandreth	Austin Mitchell	Anna Raeburn	Sally Jones	Lesley Joseph	Patrick Stoddart	Marcus Berkmann

=== Adam Hills era ===
The show was revived on 20 September 2013 as part of a 1980s night. This version was hosted by Adam Hills and was 1 hour long rather than 45 minutes and did not reprise what UKGameshows.com termed as the Barry Cryer rule; "just one life away for each incorrect answer in round one". It did, however, slash the number of questions in round three down to 25, and eliminated the need for three correct answers to start question or nominate. Money was awarded for getting to the final: £1,000 for getting there; £5,000 for coming second; £10,000 for coming first + £1,000 for however many lives they have left + £1,000 for getting any of the questions right after both the other finalists have been eliminated + £100 for every life they entered the round with. Jo Brand won this episode, winning £21,100 for her charity.

Contestants
Jonathan Ross	Krishnan Guru-Murthy	Kim Woodburn	Stephen Mangan	Jo Brand	Richard Bacon	Eamonn Holmes	Arlene Phillips	Colin Jackson	Konnie Huq	Fern Britton	Alex Brooker	Dawn Harper	Ulrika Jonsson	Danny Wallace

After the first show aired, it was announced by Channel 4 that the show would be revived for four more celebrity specials featuring Hills and for twenty daytime episodes featuring Sandi Toksvig. Changes were made; money was not awarded for lives left at the end of the round two, and for the last celebrity standing, the last five questions are worth £2,000 each. The winners of these programmes were Josie Long, who raised £25,000, Stephen Mangan and Dave Gorman, who both raised £23,000, and Sian Williams, who raised £22,000. These episodes were transmitted on 6, 13, 20 and 27 June 2015 respectively.

Contestants
Dara Ó Briain	Ann Widdecombe	Johnny Vegas	Heston Blumenthal	Kate Garraway	Anton du Beke	Josie Long	Tony Blackburn	Carley Stenson	Jon Culshaw	Rosemary Shrager	Christian Jessen	Marcus Brigstocke	Janet Street-Porter	Dom Joly
Jason Manford	Germaine Greer	Jimmy Carr	Andrea McLean	Matthew Crosby	Laurence Llewelyn-Bowen	Thelma Madine	Neil Morrissey	Roger Black	Alex Brooker	Anna Richardson	Rick Edwards	Stephen Mangan	Sharron Davies	Warwick Davis
Frank Skinner	Hilary Devey	Ade Edmondson	Diane Abbott	Chris Ramsey	Greg Rutherford	Zöe Salmon	Tim Vine	Ben Foden	Jameela Jamil	Mark Watson	Chris Hollins	Ollie Locke	Lucy Porter	Dave Gorman
Jimmy Carr	Paul Hollywood	Rachel Riley	Romesh Ranganathan	Pixie McKenna	John Craven	Cheska Hull	Josh Widdicombe	Sian Williams	Steve Pemberton	Dave Berry	Susan Calman	Matthew Wright	Patsy Kensit	Phil Tufnell

A Christmas special was broadcast on 23 December 2014. Rufus Hound raised £11,000 after a particularly tight final round in which all three contestants were standing at the end of 25 questions, and Hound opted to take two questions from 71–82 down with only one life left.

Contestants
Rufus Hound	Mariella Frostrup	Johnny Vegas	Shappi Khorsandi	Jenny Eclair	Spencer Matthews	Katherine Ryan	Phill Jupitus	Tina Malone	Mark Foster	Roisin Conaty	John Thomson	Iwan Thomas	Sunetra Sarker	Alex Horne

Four more episodes of Celebrity Fifteen to One were broadcast on 7, 14, 21 and 28 August 2015. Winners of these episodes were Alex James, who raised £11,000, Kate Humble, who raised £26,000, Gary Delaney, who raised £11,000 and Tanni Grey-Thompson, who raised £13,000.

Contestants
Sean Lock	Kay Burley	Alex James	Sally Phillips	Tony Hadley	Bill Oddie	Emily Atack	Christian O'Connell	Charlie Brooks	Joe Lycett	Nicky Clarke	Alison Hammond	Hugh Dennis	Brian McFadden	Michael Vaughan
Ken Livingstone	Meera Syal	Jim Moir	Rebecca Front	Kate Humble	Milton Jones	Amanda Lamb	Ed Byrne	Natalie Cassidy	Charlie Condou	Una Foden	Russell Kane	Jenny Jones	Isy Suttie	Dave Spikey
David Baddiel	David Haye	Sara Pascoe	Rhod Gilbert	Cathy Newman	Bruno Tonioli	Matt Forde	Shobna Gulati	Sam Thompson	Rob Beckett	Claire Richards	Olivia Lee	Greg Rusedski	Eve Pollard	Gary Delaney
Rhod Gilbert	Caroline Quentin	Julian Clary	Gareth Thomas	Donna Air	Tyger Drew-Honey	Nina Wadia	Henning Wehn	Tanni Grey-Thompson	Gyles Brandreth	Zoe Lyons	Naga Munchetty	Ellie Taylor	Paul Chowdhry	Louie Spence

William G. Stewart hosted two celebrity specials across 35 series. The revival shows include ten celebrity specials across four series of the main daytime show. The fourth series began on 18 September 2015.
