= Thirty Minutes Worth =

British TV comedy series (1972–1973)

- Genre: Sketch show
- Written by: Mike Craig; Ron McDonnell; Roy Tuvey; Maurice Sellar; Johnnie Mortimer; Dave Freeman; Vince Powell
- Directed by: Les Chatfield; William G. Stewart
- Starring: Harry Worth; Derek Benfield
- Country of origin: United Kingdom
- Original language: English
- No. of series: 3
- No. of episodes: 22

Production
- Producers: Les Chatfield; William G. Stewart
- Running time: 30 minutes
- Production company: Thames Television

Original release
- Network: ITV
- Release: 31 October 1972 – 28 November 1973

Thirty Minutes Worth is a British television comedy sketch show which aired on ITV in three series during 1972 and 1973. It was created as vehicle for the comedian Harry Worth. Following the series he went on to appear in the 1974 sitcom My Name Is Harry Worth, also produced by Thames Television at Teddington Studios.

== Cast ==
Starring Harry Worth, it also featured a variety of other actors appearing in either single or multiple episodes including Tim Wylton, Trevor Bannister, Glynn Edwards, Patsy Rowlands, Joyce Carey, Geoffrey Lumsden, Tony Selby, George Moon, Hugh Paddick, Glyn Houston, John Barron, Paula Wilcox, Meredith Edwards, Barbara Flynn, Derek Francis, Sam Kydd, Philip Madoc, Julian Orchard, Bob Todd, Richard Wilson, Norman Bird, Pamela Cundell, Marianne Stone, Robert Raglan, Frank Thornton and Derek Benfield

== Bibliography ==
- Vahimagi, Tise . British Television: An Illustrated Guide. Oxford University Press, 1996.
