= Leslie Arthur Wilcox =

English painter

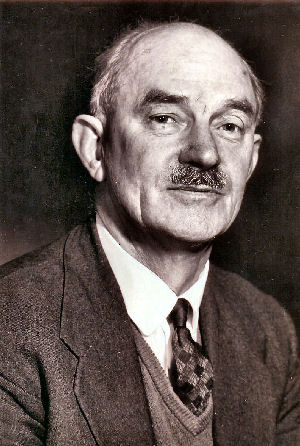
- Born: Leslie Arthur Wilcox; 13 March 1904; Fulham, London, England
- Died: 11 January 1982 (aged 77); Rustington, Sussex, England
- Occupation: Artist
- Children: 2, including Ingram Wilcox

Leslie Arthur Wilcox, RI, RSMA (13 March 1904 – 11 January 1982) was an English artist known mainly for his marine works in oils. He was also a watercolourist, illustrator, poster artist, marine model-maker and author. He was for some years Honorary Secretary of the Royal Society of Marine Artists and a member of the Royal Institute of Painters in Water Colours. His works are in many collections around the world, including the National Maritime Museum, Greenwich, and the Royal Collection. He wrote and illustrated two books on maritime history: Mr Pepys' Navy and Anson's Voyage.

== Early life ==
Born on 13 March 1904 to a working-class family in Fulham, he was the youngest of five children. Two of his brothers died in the Middle East towards the end of the First World War which seems to have had a profound effect on his outlook and beliefs. He left school at 14, and at about that time won an art competition in a national newspaper with a watercolour drawing of an aircraft; on the strength of this he obtained his first job in an advertising studios in the Strand. He learned many aspects of commercial art there, and eventually set up a studio in Holborn with two artist friends, where all three worked on illustration and children's comics.

=== Career ===
With the Second World War looming he decided to volunteer for the navy before conscription started, and had spent only a few months in the Naval Patrol Service before his skills were recognised and he was seconded to the Naval Camouflage unit at Leamington Spa, where he spent the rest of the war making model ships and testing camouflage designs. After the war he went back to his studio, but found it difficult to find illustration work, however by then he had begun to sell his oil paintings and to build a reputation as a marine artist, being elected a member of the Royal Society of Marine Artists in 1947. Then in 1953 he received a commission from the Master of Trinity House to paint the triumphal return of the Queen from the Commonwealth Tour, with the Royal Yacht Britannia passing under Tower Bridge in London; this painting was presented to Her Majesty in 1954 and it subsequently hung over the fireplace in the drawing-room of the Royal Yacht until the ship was decommissioned; the work now hangs in Frogmore House at Windsor.

From this point his work began to receive worldwide recognition. He did several paintings for Aristotle Onassis, for the Union-Castle Line and Clan Line. His large work 'Jeannette, Trafalgar 1805' (shown above) which was painted for the RSMA Jubilee Exhibition at Guildhall, London was purchased by Mr Garfield Weston, and now hangs in Fortnum and Mason's store, Piccadilly. His large work 'The Mayflower and Speedwell at Dartmouth' was bought by the Pilgrim Hall Museum in Plymouth, Massachusetts. Another large painting, 'HRH Prince of Wales Leaving Plymouth, 1861' was commissioned by Mr Stuart Liberty, and now hangs in Liberty (department store) in London. Two of his works hang in King's House, Jamaica, and countless others works in Italy, USA, Canada, Japan, Hong Kong, Australia, etc. in addition to several in the National Maritime Museum, Greenwich.

He was for many years an active member of the Wapping Group of Artists, who met regularly and exhibited yearly at the Mall Galleries; other members included Jack Merriott, Max Hofler, Hugh Boycott-Brown and David Ghilchik.

==== Personal life ====
He married Alice "Peta" Spurgeon, who was herself a painter and commercial artist, in 1939, and they had three sons, John, William and Ingram. In 1963 they moved out of London to live at Rustington in Sussex, where he built a large studio to continue his painting. It was also here that he worked on writing and illustrating his two books: Mr Pepys's Navy and Ansons Voyage. He died in Rustington in January 1982.
