= Ingram Wilcox =

British quizzer

- Born: 1944
- Occupations: Civil servant Quiz enthusiast
- Known for: Fifth winner of the UK television game show Who Wants to Be a Millionaire?
- Children: 5
- Father: Leslie Arthur Wilcox

Ingram Wilcox is an English quizzer who became the sixth person to win the £1,000,000 prize on Who Wants to Be a Millionaire? in the UK, and the fifth legitimate contestant to do so. He has also successfully competed in several other television and radio quizzes since the 1970s, including Brain of Britain, Mastermind, and Fifteen to One.

== Quiz Appearances ==
=== Mastermind ===
In 1980, Wilcox reached the final of Mastermind, finishing third out of four contestants. The final was won by Fred Housego. Wilcox's specialist subject was "The Crusades 1095–1192" in both his heat and the final. However, in the semi-final he chose "Mammals".

=== Fifteen to One ===
Wilcox appeared on Fifteen to One in both 1995 and 1996, including two grand finals.

=== Who Wants to Be A Millionaire? ===
Wilcox's £1 million question

£1 million (15 of 15)

Which boxer was famous for striking the gong in the introduction to J. Arthur Rank films?

1. Bombardier Billy Wells(correct answer)
2. Freddie Mills
3. Terry Spinks
4. Don Cockell

In two appearances of Who Wants to Be a Millionaire? (broadcast on 5 June 2004 and 11 June 2005), Wilcox reached the "Fastest Finger First" stage but did not progress any further.

On 23 September 2006, Wilcox became the fifth person to win the £1,000,000 jackpot on the show. He managed to reach the million pound question despite having used all of his lifelines by the £32,000 question. His final question was "Which boxer was famous for striking the gong in the introduction to J. Arthur Rank films?" He correctly chose Bombardier Billy Wells to win the prize money.

== Personal life ==
Wilcox grew up in London, but lived in Bath for 30 years. He worked in the civil service for most of his life, having previously worked in book illustration. He is a father of five, the son of the painter Leslie Arthur Wilcox, and brother of photographer William Wilcox.

In 2007, Wilcox moved to the South of France where he currently resides with his wife.

== Other quiz appearances ==
- Countdown, four times in 1983 and Countdown Masters in 1990
- Two Fifteen to One grand finals in 1995
- The runner-up on Brain of Britain in 1978 and 1996
- Masterbrain in 1996
- Won three episodes of Top of the World in 1982
- Who Wants to Be a Millionaire? winner in 2006

Preceded by Pat Gibson	Top prize winner on Who Wants to Be a Millionaire? (UK); 23 September 2006	Succeeded by Donald Fear
