= Patrick Stoddart =

British journalist (1944–2024)

Patrick Stoddart (23 November 1944 – 24 July 2024) was a British journalist, media consultant and presenter who was the media editor and television critic of The Sunday Times.

== Life and career ==
Stoddart was born in Watford on 23 November 1944. He attended Watford Grammar School for Boys and began his career in journalism with the Watford Observer. He then worked for the London Evening News. He has also presented television and radio programmes including The Media Show and has worked for ITV, Channel 4 and Radio 4. In 1992 he won a celebrity special edition of Fifteen to One. He later founded a media consultancy and became a senior lecturer in journalism at the University of Westminster. Stoddart died on 24 July 2024, at the age of 79.
