= Robert Sharples =

British composer (1913–1987)

Robert Sharples (2 July 1913 – 8 September 1987), known as Bob Sharples, was a British musical conductor, composer and bandleader, whose work encompassed films and well-known British television programmes in the 1960s and 1970s, most notably Opportunity Knocks (1964–1978).

== Early life and bands ==
Sharples was born in Bury, Lancashire, England. He began playing piano at the age of seven and organ at eleven. He studied orchestration, composition and conducting with Hamilton Harty in Manchester before moving to London to enter the world of jazz, where he played in nightclubs and began writing arrangements for big band leaders such as Ambrose, Jack Harris, Roy Fox and Carroll Gibbons. In 1934 he joined the Freddy Platt band at the Carlton Ballroom, Rochdale along with Geoff Love; Sharples played piano, and Love played trombone. Sharples also played with Teddy Foster's big band, which was formed in 1945.

== Decca ==
After the war and into the 1950s and 1960s Sharples became established as an independent arranger, conductor and musical director. Bob Sharples and His Music recorded many LPs for Decca Records, backing such artists as Jimmy Young, Lorrae Desmond, Tonia Bern, Kenneth McKellar and Sandie Shaw. Recordings for Decca under his own name included a series of themed arrangements, such as Dancing Round the World (1958), Waltz Magic (1958), America on the March (1964), and Battle Stereo (1964). He also worked with Lionel Bart, providing the orchestrations for the 1962 musical Blitz!. In 1963, Sharples conducted the London Festival Orchestra (Decca's 'house orchestra') in a Phase 4 LP of music by Tchaikovsky, including the 1812 Overture and the Nutcracker suite.

== Television variety and film ==
In the early 1960s Sharples became Musical Director for ABC Television based at Manchester's Didsbury Studios, where (with help from Ronnie Taylor and Johnny Roadhouse) he formed The ABC Television Orchestra. This was used to supply music for all the ABC shows of the period, including Big Night Out (1961–1965), Saturday Bandbox (1962) and the long-running talent show Opportunity Knocks (from 1964), whose host Hughie Green would routinely refer to Sharples as "Uncle Bob". When Opportunity Knocks was taken on by Thames TV in 1968, moving to the Teddington Studios, Sharples and his band were retained until the run finished in 1978.

His best-known compositions are in the field of TV theme music and film music. Under the pseudonym Robert Earley (a musical joke, as he often arrived late for sessions) he wrote the themes for ABC's Public Eye and the later series of Special Branch, and under the pseudonym E. Ward composed the theme music for the 1969 ATV television series Fraud Squad. Sharples' other TV credits include themes for Thames Television, including Man At The Top (1970–1972), The Rivals of Sherlock Holmes (1971), Harriet's Back in Town (1972), and Napoleon and Love (1974). He wrote music for the BBC documentary series The Explorers (1973–1975), as well as incidental music to the Yorkshire Television children's series Follyfoot (1972–1973) and Minder (1979) for Euston Films.

Other television variety show work with live music provided by Sharples included Hancock’s Half Hour (1956–1960, with Wally Stott), Bruce Forsyth (1965–1967), Tommy Cooper (1969) and Dave Allen at Large (1971).

His films include eight directed by Vernon Sewell between 1955 and 1963. One of his last film scores was composed for Futtocks End (1970), a comedy directed by Bob Kellett and written by Ronnie Barker. Almost entirely without dialogue, the film relies heavily on its musical score, sound effects and incoherent mutterings.

== Personal life ==
Sharples married his wife Christina (1933–2013) in 1977, although they had been together as a couple for the previous 12 years, and died in 1987 in St John's Wood, London, where he lived (once he moved South) very close to Lord's Cricket Ground. His widow became the partner of Hughie Green for the last five years of his life, though she continued to live in the St John's Wood flat until her own death in 2013.

== Selected filmography ==
- Where There's a Will (1955)
- Johnny, You're Wanted (1956)
- Soho Incident (in the US Spin a Dark Web) (1956)
- Home and Away (1956)
- Rogue's Yarn (1957)
- The Strange World of Planet X (1958)
- Battle of the V-1 (1958)
- A Prize of Arms (1962)
- A Matter of Choice (1963)
- Futtocks End (1970)
- Find the Lady (1976)

== Selected recordings ==
- Hoagy Carmichael's Ballads for Dancing, Coral CRL 57034 (1956)
- Contrasts in Hi-Fi, Decca LK 4213 (1957)
- Dancing Round the World, Decca LK 4268 (1958)
- Waltz Magic, Decca SKL 4024 (1958)
- Dimension in Sound, Decca – SKL 4110 (1960)
- Living Strings Play Music in the Night, RCA Camden SLCP 62 (1961)
- Pass in Review, London Records Phase 4, P 54001 (1961)
- 1812, London Records Phase 4, SPC 21001 (1963)
- America on the March, Decca Phase 4 PFS 4042 (1964)
- Battle Stereo, Decca Phase 4 PFS 4034 (1964)
- Living Strings: Music to Help You Stop Smoking, RCA Camden CAL 821 (1964)
- Jazz Nr. 1, Bob Sharples & The Jazz Boys, Coloursound LC 4233 (1985)
- Bob Sharples, Francis Day & Hunter Maestro Edition, FDH 0013 (2024)
