= Rickard Olsson =

Swedish television and radio presenter

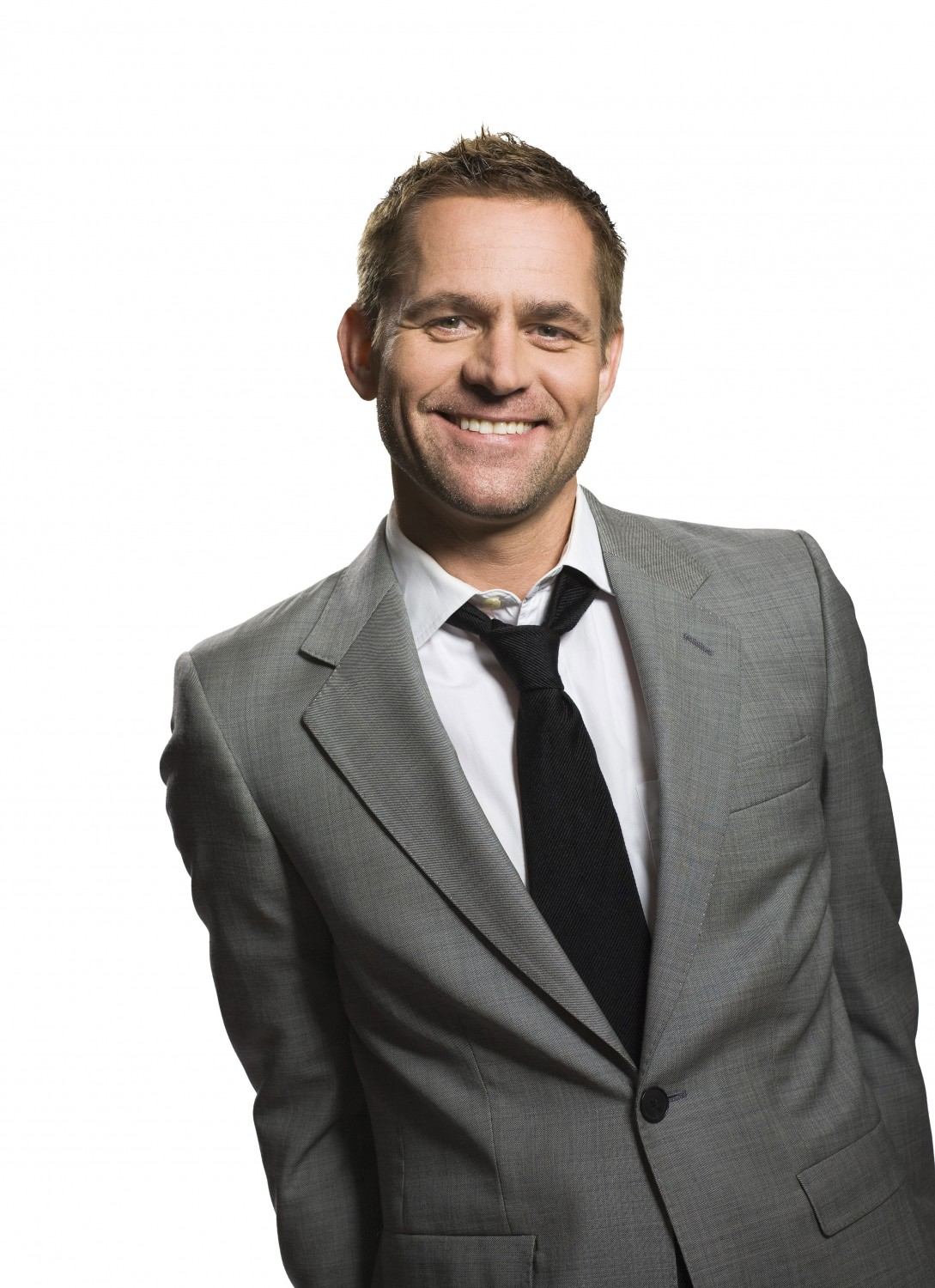
- Rickard Olsson
- Born: 7 February 1967 (age 59); Gävle, Sweden
- Occupations: radio and television presenter

Rickard Olsson-Essé, (born 7 February 1967) is a Swedish television and radio presenter. He presented Bingolotto between 2005 and 2008 and since 2008 he presents the quiz show "Vem vet mest?" and "Vem vet mest junior?" broadcast on SVT.

== Biography ==
He was born and grew up in Gävle, but today lives in Nacka outside Stockholm. Olsson studied at Stora Sätraskoland and went to high school at Vasaskolan in Gävle. In the early 1990s, Olsson studied cultural science at Örebro University in Örebro.

Olsson started his career at Radio Gävleborg; from there he went on to present the teen show Bullen, the Sunday show Söndagsöppet and Melodifestivalen, all on SVT. He also presented Nyhetsmorgon at TV4. He has presented the radio shows Morgonpasset, P4 Extra, Under Solen och Bonus, all on Sveriges Radio. Between 2005 and 2008 he presented Bingolotto at TV4.

He has presented several awards shows such as Aftonbladet's TV-pris in 2006, and the TV-award Kristallen in 2007 along with Ann Söderlund; he presented Kristallen again in 2009, this time solo. He presented the opening of Solheim Cup in 2007 from the square in Halmstad in front of an estimated 390 million viewers around the world, via (amongst other stations) CNN International and the Golf Channel.

Since late 2008, Olsson presents the SVT daily quiz show Vem vet mest? that is based on the British format Fifteen to One, that aired between 1988 and 2003 and 2013 to present on Channel 4. In 2010, he presented the game show Bubblan at SVT. And in 2011, he presented Melodifestivalen 2011 along with Marie Serneholt, the Swedish pre-selection for the Eurovision Song Contest. The same year, he presented Gäster med gester at SVT, and worked on the production of the TV3 game show Copycat Singers. Since 2012, he presents the kids game show Wild Kids. In February, 2015 Olsson won an Emmy Kids Award for his work with Wild Kids.

He participated as a celebrity dancer in Let's Dance 2025 broadcast on TV4.
