= Jeden z dziesięciu =

Polish TV quiz show

- The logo used since 2013
- Genre: Quiz show
- Created by: John M. Lewis
- Presented by: Tadeusz Sznuk
- Voices of: Elżbieta Groszek
- Country of origin: Poland
- Original language: Polish
- No. of series: 149
- No. of episodes: ca. 3500

Production
- Production locations: Warsaw (first years and since 2024); Lublin (ca. 2001–2024)
- Running time: ca. 22–28 minutes
- Production companies: Euromedia TV (since 1994); Action Time (1994–2005); TVP3 Lublin (since 2002); Granada International (2005–2018); ITV Global Entertainment (since 2018)

Original release
- Network: TVP2; TVP1 (2018–2024)
- Release: 3 June 1994

Related
- Fifteen to One

Jeden z dziesięciu (literally One Out of Ten) is a Polish general knowledge quiz show based on a British format Fifteen to One, broadcast on TVP2 (TVP1 between 2018–2024). It is the second longest running quiz show in the history of Polish television, after Wielka gra (1962–2006), and currently the longest continuously broadcast.

== Format ==
Ten contestants stand in a semicircle, each behind a lectern with a number from 1 to 10, name of the contestant and three lights to represent the player's lives (called "chances" in Polish version). Contestants answer general knowledge questions and lose "chances" for incorrect answers or failure to answer within the three-second time limit. After a contestant is eliminated from the game, their lectern is dimmed. The host asks questions until three contestants remain and they advance to the final round. The podiums are assigned to contestants by drawing lots before taping.

=== Round 1 ===
In the first round, each contestant is asked two questions. If they answer the first question incorrectly, they lose a "chance". If they answer incorrectly one more time, they lose the remaining two chances and are eliminated from the game. Therefore, to advance to round 2, contestants must answer correctly at least one question.

=== Round 2 ===
The first remaining contestant in order answers the question asked by the host; if correctly – they gain the opportunity to nominate another contestant. If a correct answer is given by a competitor from podiums 1–5, they selects a competitor from podiums 6–10 to answer, and vice versa. The number of questions in round 2 is unlimited and round 2 continues until only three contestants remain. In round 2, the competitors should nominate another competitor to answer, although the rules do not prohibit taking the question on themselves (however, this situation has only happened twice in the programme's 30-year history).

=== Round 3 ===
At the beginning of round 3, each of the three remaining contestants is given a new set of three "chances" and receives one point for each "chance" they had kept through rounds 1–2. The host reads the questions and the competitor answers after pressing the buzzer, earning 10 points for a correct answer. The first contestant to give their third correct answer gets the opportunity to nominate the next contestant. If the contestant nominates themselves and answers correctly, they receive 20 points. In round 3, the host asks a maximum of 40 questions. Round 3 can end earlier, when all contestants lose their all their "chances". Each contestant who kept their "chances" after 40 questions receives 10 additional points for each "chance" they have defended. The winner is the contestant who was the last to keep a "chance" while the others lost it. If more than one contestant still has a "chance" after 40 questions, the one with the most points wins. If there is a tie, the players with the most points are the winners and the prize is divided in half. If the competitors have scored enough points, they qualify for the Grand Final at the end of the season. The maximum number of points a competitor can score in a single episode is 803 (3 points for "chances" retained from rounds 1–2 and answering all 40 questions correctly). In the history of the program so far, only one participant has scored 803 points, in the episode broadcast on November 23, 2023.

=== Grand Final ===
Ten players who scored the most points in the regular episode throughout the season take part in the Grand Final. If there is a tie and the number of competitors exceeds 10, the organizer reserves the right to additional eliminations, although it happened that even twelve competitors took part in the Grand Final. The same rules apply to the Grand Finale as to the regular episode.

=== Prizes ===
As of 2024, the winner of the regular episode wins PLN 5,000 and a stay in a luxury hotel; the winner of the Grand Final receives PLN 40,000 and additional prizes; the contestant who gained the most points throughout the season – even if they didn't win the Grand Final – receives PLN 10,000. All competitors who qualify for round 3 receive small prizes, such as containers of sweets or watches.

== Tapings ==
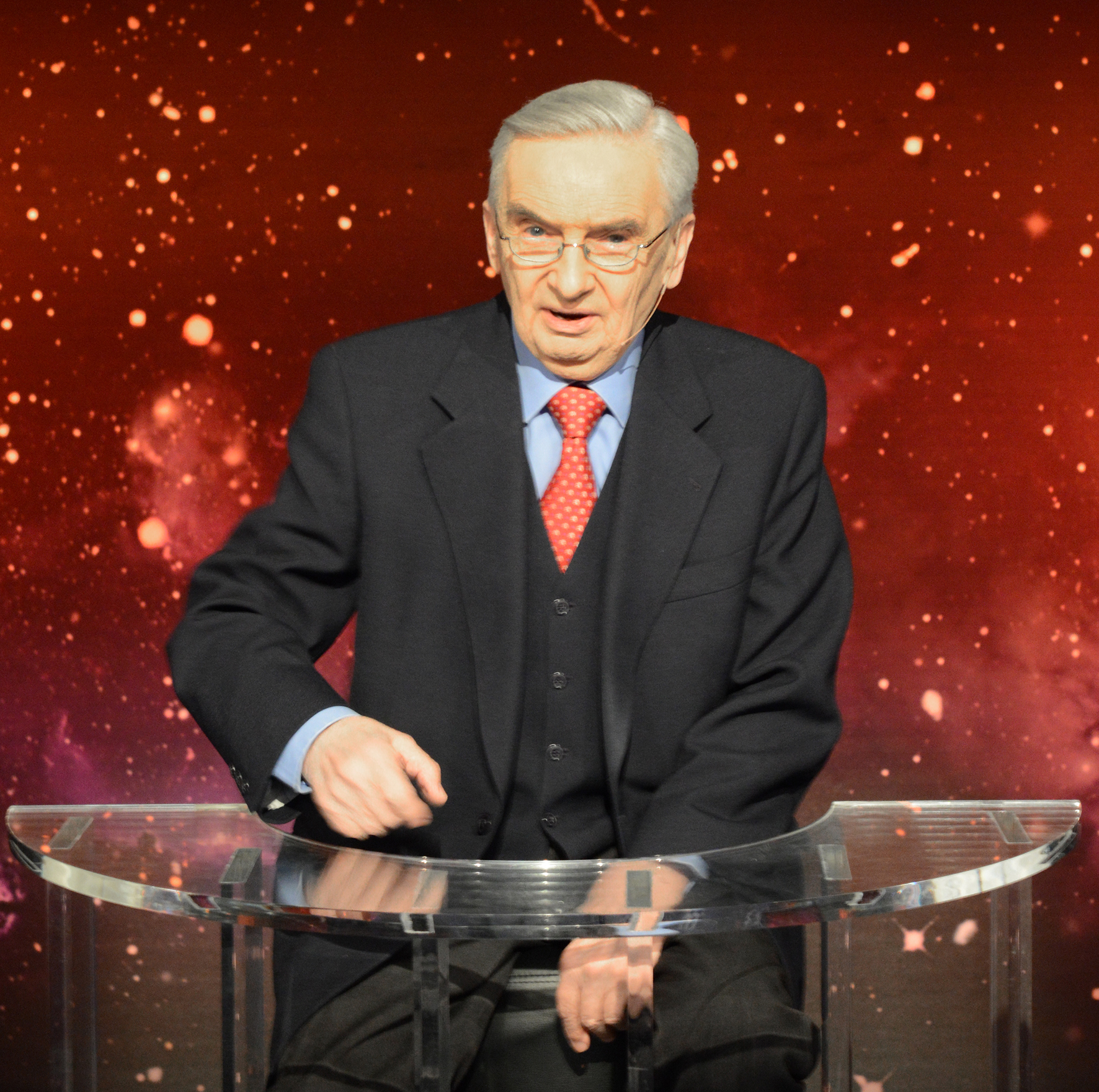
Tadeusz Sznuk at the set of Jeden z dziesięciu in 2021.

For many years, the program was recorded in the TVP3 Lublin studio. However, in 2024, the tapings moved to Warsaw. Several episodes of one series are recorded in a row in one day. People who want to get take part in the program must complete a quiz consisting about twenty-five to thirty questions, and they can only make two mistakes. If a candidate makes three mistakes, they may be asked an additional questions – if they answer correctly, they can qualify for the program. The waiting time for an invitation to the program after correctly completing the quiz can be up to over a year.

== Transmissions ==
The first episode of Jeden z dziesięciu was broadcast on 3 June 1994 on TVP2. The host of the program from the very beginning is Tadeusz Sznuk, a Polish radio and TV presenter. As of 2024, the current hostess giving prizes to the participants of round 3 is usually Sylwia Toczyńska.

On January 15, 2018 – after 24 years – the programme was moved to TVP1. Jacek Kurski, then the president of Telewizja Polska, informed that this change was dictated by the demands of viewers of the historical TV series The Crown of the Kings who didn’t want to switch channels to watch their favorite programs. Media not associated with the then Polish government noticed that this change was most likely dictated by the falling viewership of TVP1's main news program, Wiadomości. In 2024, the show moved back to TVP2.

=== Airdates and winners ===
Series	First episode	Grand Final	Winner (pts.)
1	3 June 1994	2 December 1994	Jacek Gawrych (164)
2	9 December 1994	2 March 1995	Michał Haładyj (214)
3	3 March 1995	12 May 1995	Bogusław Majewski (234)
4	18 May 1995	1 September 1995	Roman Lewandowski
5	7 September 1995	15 December 1995	Jan Helak (366)
6	21 December 1995	28 March 1996	Janusz Mrzigod (184)
7	3 April 1996	27 June 1996	Jacek Cieślak (384)
8	3 July 1996	16 October 1996	Jan Małek (284)
9	17 October 1996	23 January 1997	Waldemar Kucaj-Solecki
10	29 January 1997	24 April 1997	Radosław Kołodziej (134)
11	30 April 1997	31 July 1997	Jerzy Gierduszewski (343)
12	6 August 1997	30 October 1997	Grzegorz Deszczak (266)
13	5 November 1997	18 February 1998	unknown
14	19 February 1998	20 May 1998	unknown
15	21 May 1998	27 August 1998	Mirosław Szaciłło (413)
16	2 September 1998	12 November 1998	Andrzej Sołomiewicz (302)
17	13 November 1998	21 January 1999	Wiesław Zagajewski (202)
18	22 January 1999	26 March 1999	Bogdan Ciszewski (253)
19	31 March 1999	2 June 1999	Tomasz Guzek (525)
20	4 June 1999	6 August 1999	Zdzisława Gruźla (184)
21	11 August 1999	7 October 1999	Marek Pakleza (203)
22	8 October 1999	9 December 1999	Grażyna Klimowicz-Bożko (353)
23	10 December 1999	11 February 2000	Karol Śledź (486)
24	16 February 2000	13 April 2000	Bohdan Waydyk (314)
25	14 April 2000	15 June 2000	Anna Rychlicka (185)
26	28 June 2000	30 August 2000	Zbigniew Glapa (365)
27	31 August 2000	26 October 2000	Wiesław Bejda (295)
28	31 October 2000	3 January 2001	Tomasz Niechoda (293)
29	4 January 2001	14 March 2001	Longin Gałecki (403)
30	15 March 2001	24 May 2001	Małgorzata Fangrat (223)
31	29 May 2001	7 August 2001	Dariusz Janicki (204)
32	8 August 2001	16 October 2001	Tadeusz Kurak (355)
33	17 October 2001	8 January 2002	Ludwik Jaworski (364)
34	9 January 2002	20 March 2002	Tomasz Sobieraj (264)
35	21 March 2002	5 June 2002	Zbigniew Bernat (174)
36	6 June 2002	31 October 2002	Aleksander Borowski (302)
37	5 November 2002	28 January 2003	Andrzej Dudek (375)
38	29 January 2003	3 April 2003	Stanisław Słowik (184)
39	8 April 2003	11 June 2003	Piotr Karski (193)
40	2 September 2003	20 November 2003	Witold Banaszkiewicz (514)
41	25 November 2003	4 February 2004	Sławomir Paprocki (194)
42	9 February 2004	19 April 2004	Stefan Kisielewski (145)
43	20 April 2004	21 September 2004	Tomasz Zomerfeld (375)
44	22 September 2004	24 November 2004	Andrzej Pawlik (224)
45	25 November 2004	2 February 2005	Grzegorz Walczak (273)
46	3 February 2005	12 April 2005	Marek Krukowski (415)
47	13 April 2005	15 June 2005	Wiesław Noga (245)
48	16 June 2005	16 November 2005	Krzysztof Romańczak (314)
49	17 November 2005	31 January 2006	Bogusław Lewandowski (335)
50	1 February 2006	18 April 2006	Piotr Żelazko (235)
51	24 April 2006	27 September 2006	Rafał Gajda (324)
52	28 September 2006	2 January 2007	Stanisław Beszczyński (305)
53	3 January 2007	27 March 2007	Jacek Poprawiak (396)
54	28 March 2007	5 September 2007	Bohdan Waydyk (304)
55	6 September 2007	3 January 2008	Piotr Bruc (303)
56	9 January 2008	10 April 2008	Bogusława Soboń (223)
57	16 April 2008	8 October 2008	Ewa Nowicka (344)
58	9 October 2008	5 February 2009	Michał Markiewicz (484)
59	11 February 2009	14 May 2009	Dominik Rauer (504)
60	20 May 2009	9 November 2009	Witold Dziuba (202)
61	10 November 2009	22 February 2010	Bogusław Łojczyk (666)
62	1 March 2010	5 October 2010	Marcin Kotulski (383)
63	6 October 2010	7 December 2010	Włodzimierz Piasecki (264)
64	8 December 2010	15 February 2011	Wiesław Chwajta (282)
65	16 February 2011	19 April 2011	Stanisław Prajsnar (274)
66	20 April 2011	29 September 2011	Jakub Maniara (303)
67	3 October 2011	17 November 2011	Tadeusz Orzeł (244)
68	21 November 2011	22 March 2012	Mariusz Małgorzaciak (325)
69	26 March 2012	15 May 2012	Zbigniew Polański (212)
70	16 May 2012	21 September 2012	Wojciech Pluta (223)
71	24 September 2012	30 October 2012	Jerzy Grygiel (473)
72	31 October 2012	5 December 2012	Adam Różycki (402)
73	27 February 2013	28 March 2013	Jakub Gach (455)
74	29 March 2013	29 April 2013	Waldemar Pieńkowski (354)
75	30 April 2013	3 June 2013	Jarosław Kubik (534)
76	2 September 2013	30 September 2013	Dominik Rauer (834)
77	1 October 2013	30 October 2013	Grażyna Klimowicz-Bożko (303)
78	31 October 2013	3 December 2013	Jolanta Syganiec (476)
79	25 February 2014	14 April 2014	Jarosław Malec (313)
80	15 April 2014	3 June 2014	Stanisław Beszczyński (644)
81	1 September 2014	29 September 2014	Kamil Szwaba (474)
82	1 October 2014	29 October 2014	Paweł Bończyk (585)
83	30 October 2014	28 November 2014	Karol Romaszko (644)
84	2 March 2015	30 March 2015	Rafał Olczak (585)
85	31 March 2015	29 April 2015	Danuta Bzdawka (463)
86	30 April 2015	29 May 2015	Piotr Żelazko (404)
87	31 August 2015	29 September 2015	Bogusław Lewandowski (375)
88	30 September 2015	30 October 2015	Leszek Białkowski (475)
89	2 November 2015	3 December 2015	Małgorzata Łoboda (212)
90	4 December 2015	15 January 2016	Jacek Przybysiak (345)
91	29 February 2016	29 March 2016	Piotr Bruc (826)
92	30 March 2016	27 April 2016	Arkadiusz Dziublak (212)
93	28 April 2016	30 May 2016	Krystyna Wegner (294)
94	29 August 2016	26 September 2016	Mariusz Małgorzaciak (555)
95	27 September 2016	25 October 2016	Daniel Mandela (272)
96	26 October 2016	25 November 2016	Jerzy Grygiel (245)
97	27 February 2017	27 March 2017	Miłosz Rosiak (524)
98	28 March 2017	26 April 2017	Jan Ziętal (163)
99	27 April 2017	30 May 2017	Mirosław Mięsowicz (676)
100	28 August 2017	25 September 2017	Tomasz Kuchta (233)
101	26 September 2017	24 October 2017	Waldemar Pieńkowski (604)
102	25 October 2017	22 November 2017	Michał Sołtysik (213)
103	23 November 2017	21 December 2017	Marcin Pełczyński (546)
104	26 February 2018	28 March 2018	Edward Rakszewski (505)
105	29 March 2018	27 April 2018	Karol Romaszko (604)
106	30 April 2018	28 May 2018	Dominik Rauer (906)
107	3 September 2018	1 October 2018	Ewa Wyciślak (284)
108	2 October 2018	30 October 2018	Stanisław Alot (344)
109	31 October 2018	3 December 2018	Jarosław Malec (354)
110	4 December 2018	4 January 2019	Stanisław Beszczyński (426)
111	7 March 2019	8 April 2019	Krzysztof Gliński (564)
112	9 April 2019	8 May 2019	Mariusz Kępka (365)
113	9 May 2019	6 June 2019	Jerzy Józefowicz (324)
114	9 September 2019	7 October 2019	Wojciech Jarosz (396)
115	8 October 2019	6 November 2019	Sławomir Kerber (344)
116	7 November 2019	6 December 2019	Jarosław Orlański (314)
117	12 February 2020	16 March 2020	Arkadiusz Kopeć (605)
118	17 March 2020	13 August 2020	Konrad Jurgiewicz (283)
119	14 August 2020	11 September 2020	Danuta Bzdawka (483)
120	14 September 2020	12 October 2020	Dariusz Borkowski (265)
121	13 October 2020	10 November 2020	Artur Łasiński (536)
122	12 November 2020	11 December 2020	Piotr Bruc (836)
123	17 February 2021	18 March 2021	Wojciech Radecki (416)
124	19 March 2021	21 April 2021	Sebastian Witkowski (555)
125	6 September 2021	4 October 2021	Janusz Kubiak (345)
126	5 October 2021	3 November 2021	Janusz Błazucki (394)
127	4 November 2021	6 December 2021	Tymoteusz Czyrson (644)
128	7 December 2021	7 January 2022	Sebastian Bączek (675)
129	9 March 2022	7 April 2022	Barbara Wilmanowicz (694)
130	8 April 2022	11 May 2022	Ryszard Wilk (235)
131	12 May 2022	13 June 2022	Waldemar Pieńkowski (654)
132	13 September 2022	12 October 2022	Dominik Szura (315)
133	13 October 2022	17 November 2022	Jacek Duda (444)
134	18 November 2022	29 December 2022	Dawid Żak (315)
135	1 March 2023	29 March 2023	Krzysztof Gliński (645)
136	30 March 2023	5 May 2023	Mirosław Mięsowicz (666)
137	8 May 2023	6 June 2023	Jan Mrozowski (572)
138	28 August 2023	25 September 2023	Piotr Szkurat (273)
139	26 September 2023	26 October 2023	Emil Witczak (455)
140	27 October 2023	24 November 2023	Daniel Szymański (404)
141	4 March 2024	2 April 2024	Adam Fabisiewicz (305)
142	3 April 2024	2 May 2024	Urszula Łyżwa (242)
143	6 May 2024	3 June 2024	Aleksandra Lech (305)
144	2 September 2024	30 September 2024	Bogusław Łojczyk (404)
145	1 October 2024	29 October 2024	Marzena Szymanowska-Pietrzyk (392)
146	30 October 2024	28 November 2024	Miłosz Rosiak (376)
147	5 March 2025	2 April 2025	Aleksander Meresiński (486)
148	3 April 2025	5 May 2025	Dominik Rauer (605)
149	6 May 2025	3 June 2025	Marcin Sokołowski (346)

== Reception ==
As of June 2024, Jeden z dziesięciu is the second-longest running quiz show in the history of Polish television after Wielka gra (1962–2006). Tadeusz Sznuk, known for his great culture and impeccable appearance, is sometimes called “the last gentleman of Polish television”.

In March 2009, the program's audience was approximately 2.44 million viewers. Episodes broadcast in Autumn 2023 were watched by an average of 1.06 million viewers.
