= Fifteen to One =

British game show

- The logo used by the revival series.
- Also known as: 15 to 1
- Genre: Quiz show
- Created by: John M. Lewis
- Presented by: William G. Stewart (1988–2003); Adam Hills (2013–2015, Celebrity); Sandi Toksvig (2014–2019)
- Voices of: Anthony Hyde (1988–1989); Laura Calland (1989–2003); Philip Lowrie (alternating); Sarah Wynter (substitute); Jennie Bond (2013–2015, Celebrity); David Riley (2014); Bill Torrance (2014–2016); Donald Pirie (2017–2019)
- Theme music composer: Paul Maguire (1988–2003); Marc Sylvan & Richard Jacques (2013–2019)
- Country of origin: United Kingdom
- Original language: English
- No. of series: 35 (original); 10 (Revival)
- No. of episodes: 2,265 (original); 370 (Revival)

Production
- Executive producer: Tom Blakeson (2013–2019)
- Producers: William G. Stewart (1988–2003); Ed de Burgh (2013–2019)
- Production locations: Capital Studios (1988–2003); Pinewood Studios (2013); Elstree Studios (2014–); BBC Pacific Quay (2014–2019)
- Running time: 30–45 minutes (1988–2003); 60 minutes (2013–2019)
- Production companies: Regent Productions (1988–2003); Remedy Productions and Argonon (2013–2019)

Original release
- Network: Channel 4
- Release: 11 January 1988 – 19 December 2003
- Release: 5 April 2014 – 28 June 2019

Related
- Celebrity Fifteen to One

Fifteen to One is a British general knowledge quiz show broadcast on Channel 4. It originally ran from 11 January 1988 to 19 December 2003 and had a reputation for being one of the toughest quizzes on television. Throughout the show's original run, it was presented and produced by William G. Stewart. Thousands of contestants appeared on the programme, which had very little of the chatting between host and contestants that is often a feature of other television quiz shows.

== History and presenters ==
The basis of the show was devised by John M. Lewis, a former sales manager for British Telecom. He submitted the idea to Regent Productions, who developed the programme into a 30-minute format. Originally, there were 20 starting contestants, but this was reduced to 15 to fit the available running time. The number varied in other countries. William G. Stewart as producer originally only intended to present the pilot episode until a permanent host could be found if the show was taken up by one of the networks, taking the job himself when nobody suitable could be found.

Prior to Stewart's retirement, the Grand Final of Series 35 of Fifteen to One, which originally aired on 19 December 2003, was the last edition of the show in the Stewart era until it was revived nearly ten years later. It was won by John Harrison, who also won the finals board trophy of that series with a score of 291. Stewart began the show by explaining some statistics about the show, which had run since its inception on 11 January 1988. Nearly 350,000 questions had been asked to 33,975 contestants in 2,265 shows.

On 9 December 2013, it was announced that Fifteen to One would return for a new 60-minute 20-part daytime series in 2014 instead of the 30-minute format, hosted by Danish-British comedian Sandi Toksvig, and primetime celebrity specials, which would be hosted by Australian comedian Adam Hills. There were ten series and 370 episodes in the revived edition which ran from 5 April 2014 to 28 June 2019.

=== Presenters' timeline ===
Main presenters of Fifteen to One
No	Presenter	From	To	Duration
1	William G. Stewart	11 January 1988	19 December 2003	15 years, 342 days
2	Sandi Toksvig	5 April 2014	28 June 2019	5 years, 84 days

== Format ==
The set layout towards the end of the original series.

The 15 contestants stood in a semicircle, each behind a lectern with a number from 1 to 15 (a similar layout was used by the later game show The Weakest Link). Although the design varied slightly over the years, the essential elements were a number on the front of the lectern, a name badge on top of the lectern (in the earlier series, the badge was worn by the contestant) and three green neon lights to represent the lives of the contestant. The numbers were allocated by drawing lots from a bag before videotaping. Upon elimination from the game, a contestant had to sit down and their spotlight went out.

A separate lectern for each contestant was moved in place for the third and final round, with the semicircle behind it no longer lit.

Twelve of the contestants were eliminated over the course of the first two rounds, leaving three to compete in the final.

=== Round 1 ===
Each of the 15 numbered contestants began the quiz with three 'lives'. The host made two passes through the field in numerical order, asking one question to each contestant per pass; typically, the category for each question was announced before it was asked. The contestant had three seconds to respond, and lost one life for the first incorrect answer or failure to respond in time, whether on the first or second pass. A second miss took away both remaining lives and eliminated the contestant from the game. Stewart's succinct explanation of Round 1 was, "Two questions each in the first round; one correct answer from you to survive." The Celebrity Edition, however, allowed contestants who missed both of their questions to advance to the second round with one life remaining.

The outcome of Round 1 could vary considerably. Sometimes there were as few as four contestants left standing, but occasionally nobody was eliminated at all. There was never a case when only three or fewer contestants survived the round, which would have made Round 2 unnecessary. Were this to happen, the contingency plan would have been to replay the first round, although Stewart once jokingly said that he would give a talk on the Parthenon Marbles to fill the time. Stewart was an outspoken supporter of returning the Marbles to Greece, and once presented a Fifteen to One special on the subject with replicas of the Marbles placed at the contestants' podiums.

=== Round 2 ===
At this point, every surviving contestant had either two or three lives remaining (or one, two or three in the Celebrity Edition). As in Round 1, questions were asked to contestants in numerical order in turn, with one life lost for an incorrect response. The first contestant to answer correctly gained the right to "nominate", or choose another contestant to receive the next question. If the nominee answered incorrectly, they lost one life and the nominating player kept control; a correct answer turned control over to the nominee. Contestants were eliminated after losing all their lives. Towards the end of the show's original run, a new rule forbade contestants from nominating the player who had just nominated them. This rule was abandoned in the revived series. When only three contestants remained, the round ended and the programme paused for a commercial break.

Round 2 had no fixed duration or number of questions; it varied depending on how many players survived from Round 1 and how many correct answers were given. In theory, it could continue indefinitely if not enough wrong answers were given to narrow the field to three, until the pool of available questions was exhausted.

=== Round 3: The Final ===
Each of the three remaining contestants was given a new set of three lives and (except in the first two series) received one point for each life they had kept through the first two rounds. A maximum of 40 questions were asked in this round, with 10 points awarded for each correct answer and one life lost on each miss. The questions were initially open for all contestants on the buzzer until one of them gave a total of three correct answers (not necessarily on consecutive questions). That contestant could then either answer the next question directly or nominate an opponent to take it. A contestant who answered correctly gained control of the next question. If a nominee answered incorrectly, control reverted to the nominating contestant. If a contestant took a question for themselves and missed it, the buzzer questions resumed until one contestant gave a correct answer and gained control.

Once two contestants were eliminated, the remaining contestant became the day's winner and continued answering questions until all 40 had been used or all three lives were lost (whichever came first), with each correct answer still worth 10 points. However, if at least two contestants remained in the game after the questions were exhausted, the high scorer won; in the event of a tie, the contestant with the most remaining lives won. In episodes where all questions were asked, the winning contestant received an additional 10 points for every life remaining. The contestant would then earn a place on the Finals Board (see below) if their score was high enough. Regardless of their final scores and standings, all winning contestants were automatically invited to compete again in the next series. From Series 11 onward, contestants who lost in Round 3 were also invited to return if their score would have been high enough to earn a place on the Finals Board.

=== Finals Board/Leaderboard ===
The 15 highest-scoring winners and their totals during any given series were displayed in a table referred to at different times as the Finals Board or Leaderboard. The board was cleared at the beginning of each new series, and the winners of the first 15 episodes were automatically entered onto it in descending order by score. Beyond the 15th episode, earlier winners could be displaced from the board by being outscored, and newer winners who failed to match or surpass the last-place score did not earn a slot on it at all. If more contestants were tied for last place than there were available slots at the bottom of the board, they were said to be "on the sidelines", and were frequently listed off to one side rather than on the board itself – for example, if three contestants tied for 14th place.

=== Grand Final ===
At the end of a series, the 15 winners still listed on the Finals Board competed in the Grand Final. An unscreened playoff took place immediately before the Grand Final if there were still people on the sidelines tied for last place.

For the first eight series, the third round of each Grand Final followed the same "question/nominate" format as the regular episodes. In all subsequent series, all 40 questions were played on the buzzer.

== Prizes ==
There was no prize for winning an individual episode. Many players would win one of the daily shows but would not achieve a high enough score to appear on the high-score board for a place in the Grand Final. All winning players were invited back for the next series. Some players became so regular that in the last few series Grand Final winners would not get such an invitation. Initially, players who did not win were generally not permitted to compete again; this rule applied even if they had been previous winners. However, in 2000, the rule was altered to allow players who had previously played a while earlier and had not got as far as the Grand Final to apply to be on the show again.

The series prize tended to be a classical artefact (for example an ancient Greek vase). Prizes were occasionally valued at several million pounds by archaeologists, and were presented to the winning contestant by the regular voice-over artist, Laura Calland (who married Stewart in 1997). Voice-overs were occasionally provided by other presenters, usually Philip Lowrie and occasionally Sarah Wynter, but only Calland was seen on screen, when she presented the prize. In later series, the highest-scoring person on the finals board also received a minor trophy. In series 1 to 3 the original voice-over was Anthony Hyde, although he was never seen on screen, and in the early days William G. Stewart presented the prize himself in the Grand Final. Calland became the regular voice-over artist at the beginning of series 4, after Anthony Hyde left at the end of series 3.

The Grand Final of Series 34, in early 2003, saw the only series tie. It was one of only four ties in the show's history, such a result being possible only when two contestants finished the final level on points and lives remaining. In this case, Jack Welsby and David Stedman both finished on 101 points with one life remaining. No provision had been made for a tie-breaker, so Stewart offered to buy a prize of equal value for the two winners.

In the 2014 revival, episode winners receive trophies, and the series winner receives a cash prize of £40,000.

== Records ==
The maximum end game score of 433 could only be achieved if a player started the end game with all three lives intact and correctly answered all 40 questions. The player scored 3 points for retaining their three lives from the first two rounds, 400 points for answering the 40 questions correctly, and 30 points for retaining their three lives from the end game. The maximum score was achieved only once by Bill McKaig, a minister from Glasgow, in April 1999 (Series 25). The other two contestants in that final, Martin Penny and Alison Shand, were invited back for the next series even though they had not won, a very rare exception to the rule preventing losers from competing on the show again.

The feat of correctly answering all 40 questions in the final was also achieved by Daphne Fowler in May 2000 (Series 28). However, she scored 432, having answered a question incorrectly in round 2 of that episode. As with the time Bill McKaig managed his 433 score, the other two contestants in the final, Don Street and Eric Matthews, were allowed to try again. The feat of scoring over 400 in the final was achieved on two other occasions, both in Series 32: Michael Penrice achieved a score of 423 on 30 January 2002, having been beaten to the buzzer for one of the questions at the start of the final, before Matti Watton achieved a score of 412, after attempting all 40 questions but incorrectly answering one in the process. Watton's score was thus the highest not to win the Finals Board trophy, although he atoned for this by winning the subsequent Grand Final.

The highest number of people ever to go out of the first round is 11, leaving just 4 contestants for Round 2. This happened in September 2000 (Series 29). The lowest number is 0, which also happened on a few occasions but was very rare, and even in Grand Finals it was rare despite the much higher standard level of competitors.

In Series 32, Matti Watton set the record for the highest score in the final of the Grand Final, of 222 (not including the points for the remaining lives). A close second was Nick Terry with 221, set in series 25. He also holds the record for the lowest winning score in a Grand Final, of 52 in series 26 (September 1999). This came after the other two finalists, Eddie Collins and Martin Ewers, had lost all three lives. Terry won four Grand Final titles; however, he never held a finals board trophy.

In the final original series, in late 2003, Gwyneth Welham achieved the highest winning score that failed to make the Grand Final, with the score being 211. She was knocked off the Finals Board with eight shows remaining in the series when Barry Smith scored 232. Wil Ransome and Andrew Dickens were joint 14th, with a score of 221. Andrew Auger's score of 203 failed to make the Grand Final in series 27 (early 2000), as did Nick Terry's and Alan Gibbs' scores of 202 in series 27 and 32 respectively. Dennis Collinson's score of 201 in series 25 (1999), which he achieved in the very first episode of the series, failed to make the Grand Final when his name was displaced from the board on the very last episode before the Grand Final.

The lowest ever winning score was 10, scored by Mila First in series 1, episode 36.) The most appearances without winning either trophy (14, by Chris Russon from series 4 to series 12); also, Paul Hillman was the only Fifteen to One champion (he won the series 24 grand final) to win only once.

In the Grand Final, several people have achieved the feat of not getting a question wrong in the first two rounds. People who have done this are Mal Collier (series 2), Mike Kirby (series 7), Leslie Booth (series 14), Matti Watton (series 28 & 29), Olav Bjortomt (series 32) and Debra Carr (series 33). Only three of them went on to win the actual final.

The lowest score to lift the finals board trophy is 202, set by Thomas Dyer in series 4. In the same series, a score of 111 made the Grand Final (although a four-way play-off was required).

The rules of the series also state that a losing contestant who achieves a score that would otherwise have offered a place in a Grand Final, is given a second chance. In 2001, two contestants achieved scores of 272 (the highest losing score in the series' history) before going out on the penultimate question. The first, Liam Maxwell, a teacher from Roslea, County Fermanagh, appeared in the next series Grand Final with a score of 223 (series 30). The second, Alan Gibbs, achieved a winning score of 202 when he returned a year later in series 32, but failed to make the Grand Final after his name was displaced from the board with three episodes remaining.

== Controversy ==
In 1998, Trevor Montague, a former contestant, was sued by Regent Productions. Montague broke the rule that losers on the programme cannot take part again unless invited back. Having been knocked out in 1989, he entered again in 1992 under the name "Steve Romana". A viewer who was watching a repeat of the series on Challenge TV, noticed similarities in appearance between Montague and "Steve Romana" and contacted Channel 4.

== Filming ==
The shows were filmed at Capital Studios in Wandsworth, south west London. Only in the first few series was there a live audience. William G. Stewart decided to abolish the studio audience after audience members audibly whispered answers to questions on too many occasions. After that, the audience sounds were pre-recorded, and the only real audience were any contestants who had already been knocked out and 1–4 guests per contestant (for the last few original series, however, the contestants' guests were also barred from the studio, due to a change in the layout of the filming and production equipment).

The Celebrity Special in 2013 was recorded at Pinewood Studios in front of a live studio audience. However, the revived 2014 non-celebrity series did not have an audience. The first series of the 2014 revival, including the four celebrity specials, were recorded at Elstree Studios, afterwards all subsequent series were recorded at BBC Pacific Quay, Glasgow.

== Famous episodes ==
In one show, in the 16th series in 1995, William G. Stewart dropped his cards whilst explaining the rules of the first round. The questions had to be scrapped. One contestant on this show was Ingram Wilcox, who later won the top prize on Who Wants to Be a Millionaire?.

On 25 December 1999, a "Millennium Quiz" episode brought back 25 contestants to compete for a silver trophy in a four-round contest. Lives were not used until the final round; instead, contestants began with 100 points, scoring 10 for a correct answer and losing 5 for a miss. Round 1 employed the usual two passes through the field, while Rounds 2 and 3 gave each contestant the chance to answer five questions. Only the top 15 scorers advanced past Round 2, and only the top three reached the final, which followed the standard Grand Final rules and scoring.

In the grand final of series 29 shown in December 2000 (won by Matti Watton), one contestant, who was standing at position 4, could not be identified for legal reasons, so the contestant's two questions were edited out, and the camera jumped from contestant 3 to 5. The contestant was eliminated in the first round, so the episode progressed as normal. The heat episode that the "mystery contestant" won was also never aired, being replaced by a repeat of Bill McKaig's perfect 433 episode.

== Revival ==
In August 2013, the Daily Mirror reported that Fifteen to One was to make a special comeback on Channel 4, on 20 September 2013, as part of a weekend devoted to the 1980s. This was later confirmed by Channel 4. The one-off 60-minute special was hosted by comedian Adam Hills and featured celebrities as the contestants. A television source said: "Everyone remembers Fifteen To One and who knows what could happen if the audience is big enough or it creates a stir on Twitter. A new series and a comeback is not out of the question. It has a proven track record."

The special was produced by Remedy Productions at Pinewood Studios on 13 September. Jo Brand won this episode for charity, with Jennie Bond providing the voiceover. The special was originally watched by 1.64 million viewers, ranking ninth in the channel's top 10 programmes that week.

On 9 December 2013, it was announced that Fifteen to One would return for a new 20-part daytime series in 2014, hosted by Sandi Toksvig, and primetime celebrity specials, which would be hosted by Hills. Fifteen to One returned for a new daytime series on 5 April 2014, hosted by Toksvig. Four celebrity specials in the primetime slot were hosted by Hills. Filming of the daytime series took place in February 2014 at Elstree Studios. The all celebrity specials are shot at the Pinewood Studios used for the 80s special, but daytime versions were shot at Elstree for Series 1, then subsequently Pacific Quay, Glasgow from Series 2 to Series 10.

Channel 4 renewed the show for a 40-part second series in July 2014. It was subsequently renewed again for three more series with 100 parts in total in both 2015 (Series 3–4), 2016 (Series 5–6), 2017 (Series 7–8) and 2018 (Series 9). Series 10 was aired in 2019 and no further series have been aired since.

Andy Tucker won the 10th and last-ever revival edition of Fifteen to One which originally aired on 28 June 2019, with a score of 213.

=== Format changes ===
In the revival series, the Grand Final winner receives a £40,000 cash prize and each player has three chances to reach the final round of a show. A player can thus appear in up to four shows in total (three regular episodes, and then the Grand Final if they win the final on their last appearance and score well enough on the Leaderboard). However, players who reach the final and lose are no longer eligible to appear, regardless of how many games they have played. Additionally, each episode winner receives a trophy, regardless of whether their score is high enough to post on the Leaderboard or reach the Grand Final. Because contestants have three chances to reach the final, there are increased opportunities for the host to chat and learn more details about them as the game progresses.

Some contestants who appeared in the original series have also competed in the revived series, including Series 33 Champion David Good (who made it to the Grand Final on his third attempt in Series 1). Unlike in the original series, series winners are not invited to reappear in subsequent series. Initially, each new series commenced with 15 fresh contestants, and players from the later heats of the previous series who had not exhausted all of their games were not invited to return for the following series. However, from Series 3 onwards, this rule was changed to allow still-eligible previous contestants to continue at the start of the following series, if commissioned. From Series 7, contestants who have previously appeared in the revived series are permitted to reapply.

Since Series 2, a new rule was introduced in the final of the Grand Final. If a contestant answers incorrectly, one life is lost and the same question is repeated so that the opponent(s) may answer.

== Transmissions ==
=== Original series ===
Series	Start date	End date	Episodes	Notes
1	11 January 1988	1 April 1988	60	First original series to be hosted by William G. Stewart. First series to alternate with Countdown.
2	5 September 1988	23 December 1988	80	
3	20 March 1989	7 July 1989	80	
4	16 October 1989	22 December 1989	50	
5	2 April 1990	29 June 1990	65	
6	1 October 1990	21 December 1990	60	
7	1 April 1991	28 June 1991	65	
8	30 September 1991	20 December 1991	60	
9	30 March 1992	26 June 1992	65	
10	28 September 1992	18 December 1992	60	
11	5 April 1993	2 July 1993	65	
12	4 October 1993	24 December 1993	60	
13	4 April 1994	1 July 1994	65	
14	3 October 1994	23 December 1994	60	
15	3 April 1995	30 June 1995	65	
16	2 October 1995	22 December 1995	60	
17	1 April 1996	28 June 1996	65	Last series to alternate with Countdown.
18	16 September 1996	17 December 1996	60	No episodes aired on 19-20 September, 3-4 October, 17-18 October and 15 November. Both shows run together at the same time until the show's first demise on 19 December 2003.
19	13 January 1997	17 April 1997	55	No episodes aired on 11-13 March and 31 March.
20	21 April 1997	18 July 1997	64	No episode aired on 6 June.
21	22 September 1997	18 December 1997	63	No episode aired on 14 November.
22	12 January 1998	10 April 1998	62	No episodes aired on 17-19 March.
23	14 April 1998	10 July 1998	63	No episode aired on 5 June.
24	21 September 1998	16 December 1998	62	No episode aired on 8 October.
25	11 January 1999	22 April 1999	70	No episodes aired on 16-18 March and 5 April.
26	20 September 1999	24 December 1999	80	
27	3 January 2000	29 March 2000	60	No episodes aired on 14-16 March.
28	30 March 2000	14 June 2000	50	No episodes aired on 24 April, 18-22 May and 9 June.
29	18 September 2000	22 December 2000	70	
30	26 December 2000	13 April 2001	75	
31	24 September 2001	21 December 2001	63	
32	7 January 2002	12 April 2002	70	
33	16 September 2002	20 December 2002	70	
34	6 January 2003	11 April 2003	70	
35	15 September 2003	19 December 2003	70	Last original series to be hosted by William G. Stewart.

==== Broadcast scheduling ====
Sometimes, Fifteen to One alongside Countdown was not shown when Channel 4 broadcast either the Cheltenham Festival or an England Test match: that is why there were fewer episodes in some series. Repeats were sometimes shown if a Test match either stopped due to rain or finished early. However, when the 2001 Cheltenham Festival was cancelled, due to foot-and-mouth outbreak, Channel 4 did not show any Fifteen to One repeats. Between 11 January 1988 and 28 June 1996, Fifteen To One and Countdown alternated in the schedule with Countdown typically airing between January and March as well as July and September with Fifteen to One airing between April and June as well as October and December. The practice was dropped by series 18 when both shows ran together in the schedule until its original demise on 19 December 2003 when William G. Stewart retired from hosting duties and continued again upon its revival with Stewart's replacement Sandi Toksvig from 5 April 2014 to its final demise on 28 June 2019.

=== Fifteen to One Schools ===
Series	Start date	End date	Episodes
1	26 April 1999	18 June 1999	40

=== Revival series ===
This table details the daytime revival, excluding the 1+4 specials hosted by Adam Hills.

Series	Start date	End date	Episodes	Notes
1	5 April 2014	1 May 2014	20	First revived series to be hosted by Sandi Toksvig.
2	13 October 2014	5 December 2014	40	
3	13 July 2015	17 September 2015	40	
4	18 September 2015	30 October 2015	30	
5	11 April 2016	31 May 2016	30	
6	1 June 2016	11 August 2016	40	
7	13 February 2017	21 April 2017	50	
8	24 April 2017	30 June 2017	50	
9	5 November 2018	21 December 2018	35	
10	13 May 2019	28 June 2019	35	Last revived series to be hosted by Sandi Toksvig.

== Series winners ==
=== Original ===
Series	Grand Final Winner(s)	Top of the Finals Board	Score	Aired
1	Jon Goodwin	Peter Knott	270	1988
2	Mal Collier	Fred Gavin	290	1988
3	Kevin Ashman	Mal Collier	261	1989
4	Andrew Francis	Thomas Dyer	202	1989
5	Anthony Martin	Anthony Martin	251	1990
6	Mike Kirby	Mike Kirby	281	1990
7	Thomas Dyer	Mike Kirby	263	1991
8	Anthony Martin	Katharine Heaney	242	1991
9	Julian Allen	Barbara Thompson	252	1992
10	Barbara Thompson	Sheri Evans	231	1992
11	Anthony Martin	Tim Goadby	242	1993
12	Glen Binnie	Andrew McGlennon	302	1993
13	Stanley Miller	Peter Fillingham	251	1994
14	Leslie Booth	Lesley Webster	262	1994
15	Leslie Booth	Christopher Cooke	292	1995
16	Ian Potts	Susan O'Donoghue	231	1995
17	Arnold O’Hara	John Clarke	291	1996
18	Martin Riley	Martin Riley	333	1996
19	Trevor Montague (Note: Montague lost his prize in a court case. William G. Stewart was tipped off by an eagle-eyed viewer that Montague had appeared on the programme in disguise and under a different name to avoid the programme's strict rules that losing players could not re-enter unless invited.)	Christopher Bostock	292	1997
20	Bill Francis	Rosemary Broome	311	1997
21	Nick Terry	John Emmines; Christopher Bostock	272	1997
Champion of Champions		Mal Collier	131	1997
22	Nick Terry	Bill McKaig	272	1998
23	Bill McKaig	Roy Smith	293	1998
24	Paul Hillman	Michael Irwin	311	1998
25	Nick Terry	Bill McKaig	433 (Note: McKaig is to date the only player in the history of the show to achieve a maximum score in the final round.)	1999
Schools	Audenshaw School	Royal Belfast Academical Institution	290	1999
26	Nick Terry	Michael Penrice	321	1999
27	Les Arnott	John Jenkins	303	2000
28	Dag Griffiths	Daphne Fowler	432	2000
29	Matti Watton	Daphne Fowler	383	2000
30	Daphne Fowler	Daphne Fowler	333	2001
31	Daphne Fowler	Martin Saunders	292	2001
32	Matti Watton	Michael Penrice	423	2002
33	David Good	Jim MacIntosh	271	2002
34	Jack Welsby; David Stedman	Azeez Feshitan	291	2003
35	John Harrison	John Harrison	291	2003

=== Revival ===
Series	Grand Final Winner	Top of the Finals Board	Score	Aired
1	Dave McBryan	Iwan Thomas	242	2014
2	Gerard Mackay	Mark Kerr	251	2014
3	Peter Finan	Gareth Watkins	241	2015
4	Ailsa Watson	Dave Cowan	272	2015
5	Gareth Kingston	Bob Haigh	292	2016
6	Huw Pritchard	Barbara Levy	191	2016
7	Ross Goodwin	Ross Goodwin	212	2017
8	Max Espensen	Max Espensen	223	2017
9	Ryland Morgan	Ryland Morgan	353	2018
10	Andy Tucker	Andy Tucker	213	2019

== International versions ==
Country	Title	Broadcaster	Presenter	Start date	End date
Germany	Jeder gegen Jeden	Sat.1	Hans-Hermann Gockel (1996–1999); Holger Speckhahn (2000–2001)	9 September 1996	2001
Greece	Δεκα με τονο Deke me tono	ANT1	Giorgos Papadakis	1997	1999
Hungary	Ki marad a végén?	MTV1	György Rózsa	1998	2000
Iran	ثانیها; Saaneeye-ha	IRIB TV2	Shahram Shakiba	2015	2018
Norway	15–1; 10–1	TVNorge	Ingebrigt Steen Jensen	16 September 1996	21 April 1997
Peru	Máximo desafío	Red Global	Alejandro Guerrero	2001	2002
Poland	Jeden z dziesięciu	TVP2 (1994–2017, 2024–); TVP1 (2018–2024)	Tadeusz Sznuk	3 June 1994	present
Sweden	Vem vet mest?	SVT2	Rickard Olsson (2008–2018); Johan Wester (2018–2020)	25 August 2008	Spring 2020

The Polish version of the format, Jeden z dziesięciu, quizzes only ten participants (the German and Greek versions also use ten contestants) and each episode lasts twenty to thirty minutes. It is often being informally referred to as "the last true quiz show" because of its emphasis on knowledge, instead of special effects, celebrities and physical skills as well as due to the host's persona, Tadeusz Sznuk, who is often informally called "the last gentleman of television". The series is also the second longest running quiz show in the history of Polish television.

The Hungarian version on MTV 1 used nine contestants, and since 15 June 2015, it has been repeated on the public retro-channel M3.

The Iranian version of Fifteen to One aired on IRIB TV2 used fourteen contestants.

The Swedish format was transmitted every week day on SVT2, with the Friday edition being a final of the week's top contestants. The Swedish version has eight (formerly twelve) contestants.
