= A Sharp Intake of Breath =

- A Sharp Intake of Breath opening titles by Mel Calman
- Genre: Sitcom
- Created by: Ronnie Taylor
- Written by: Ronnie Taylor (1977–80), Kenneth Cope (1978), Leslie Duxbury (1978), Vince Powell (1981)
- Directed by: Les Chatfield (1977–79); Stuart Allen (1980–81)
- Starring: David Jason; Jacqueline Clarke; Richard Wilson (series 1–3); Alun Armstrong (series 1–2)
- Country of origin: United Kingdom
- Original language: English
- No. of series: 4
- No. of episodes: 22

Production
- Producers: Les Chatfield (1977–79); Stuart Allen (1980–81)
- Running time: 30 Minutes
- Production company: ATV

Original release
- Network: ITV
- Release: 28 July 1977
- Release: 28 February 1978 – 15 February 1981

A Sharp Intake of Breath is a British sitcom starring David Jason, Jacqueline Clarke with Richard Wilson and Alun Armstrong for series 1–3, that ran between 28 July 1977 and 15 February 1981, when Jason took up the role of Del Trotter in Only Fools and Horses. It was made for the ITV network by ATV and recorded at ATV Elstree Studios. The opening titles featured cartoons by Mel Calman. Series 1-3 were written by Ronnie Taylor, apart from 2 episodes in series 1 which were written by Kenneth Cope and Leslie Duxbury. Series 4 was written by Vince Powell following the death of Taylor in 1979.

== Plot ==
Jason played an everyman character called Peter Barnes and Jacqueline Clarke played his wife Sheila. Wilson and Armstrong played a range of petty officials and bureaucrats whose actions frustrated Barnes's attempts to deal with the necessities of everyday life. The title A Sharp Intake of Breath refers to the reactions of various characters to seemingly simple requests by Peter, generally followed by a denial. The show made use of the fourth wall plot device.

== Cast ==
- David Jason as Peter Barnes
- Jacqueline Clarke as Sheila Barnes
- Richard Wilson as various characters
- Alun Armstrong as various characters
- Maggie Jones as Jean
- Malcolm Storry as Cyril Potts
- Bella Emberg as Doris
- Margaret Courtenay as Sheila's Mother
- Bunny May as Terry
- Gerald Flood, as the Doctor, in 'Rear Window' .

== Episodes ==
=== Pilot (1977) ===
No. overall	No. in series	Title	Directed by	Written by	Original release date
–	–	"A Sharp Intake of Breath"	Les Chatfield	Ronnie Taylor	28 July 1977
The pilot was part of ITV's The Sounds of Laughter series of six one-off comedies. Sheila fancies having a small porch added to the back door off the kitchen, so calls in a local builder. Peter heads off to see his bank manager for a loan to cover the quote. Sheila Barnes was played by Patricia Brake in this episode.

=== Series 1 (1978) ===
No. overall	No. in series	Title	Directed by	Written by	Original release date
1	1	"Your Life In Their Hands"	Les Chatfield	Ronnie Taylor	20 February 1978
Peter doesn't much feel like eating his breakfast, which leads Sheila to insist he visit the doctor for a check-up.
2	2	"Happy Motoring"	Les Chatfield	Ronnie Taylor	27 February 1978
The car won't start, which is doubly frustrating as Peter not only has places to go, but also give Sheila a driving lesson. Typically, it turns out to be rather expensive a repair.
3	3	"Somewhere in the Sun"	Les Chatfield	Ronnie Taylor	6 March 1978
What could be easier than booking a summer holiday? As Peter is about to find out; just about anything.
4	4	"See You in Court"	Les Chatfield	Kenneth Cope	13 March 1978
The Barneses’ marital bliss is thrown awry when he's forced to bring his very drunk boss home from an office party. Peter's desperate to bring their relationship back from the brink of divorce.
5	5	"The Gasman Cometh"	Les Chatfield	Leslie Duxbury	20 March 1978
Peter begins to tear his hair out when men from the gas board arrive to install his new central heating: he has not asked for, and does not want, it.
6	6	"Seven Year Hitch"	Les Chatfield	Ronnie Taylor	27 March 1978
For their seventh wedding anniversary, Peter and Sheila intend to stay in the same hotel where they spent their honeymoon.

=== Series 2 (1979) ===
No. overall	No. in series	Title	Directed by	Written by	Original release date
7	1	"Your Move"	Les Chatfield	Ronnie Taylor	19 February 1979
Sheila's suddenly desperate to move home. She's never been happy living in their current home,apparently! All this is news to Peter, who's forced to engage with local estate agents.
8	2	"Your Very Good Health"	Les Chatfield	Ronnie Taylor	26 February 1979
Peter's hospitalised after a small accident in the garden damages his ankle. His doctor's nice enough, but the matron?
9	3	"Where There's A Will"	Les Chatfield	Ronnie Taylor	5 March 1979
The Barneses are forced to deal with Sheila's argumentative family when her aunt dies. After a series of mishaps at the wake and dealing with a grasping vicar, Peter's very surprised to discover that they've been left an old piano.
10	4	"Another Little Drink"	Les Chatfield	Ronnie Taylor	12 March 1979
Double trouble's on the horizon when Peter's workmates won't let him leave the pub without another few rounds down him first. Sheila's not happy, and after a struggle to extricate his car, neither is P.C. Reynolds
11	5	"The Square on the Hypotenuse"	Les Chatfield	Ronnie Taylor	19 March 1979
Commiserating with a stranger in the pub leads to all manner of domestic disharmony for poor Peter Barnes when both his wife and girlfriend arrive.
12	6	"What About the Workers"	Les Chatfield	Ronnie Taylor	26 March 1979
Peter's caught up in the officiousness of trade unionism when a repair man at his firm spots him, a white collared worker, turning a conveyor belt on and off. Matters are set to only get worse as the shop steward arrives.

=== Series 3 (1980) ===
No. overall	No. in series	Title	Directed by	Written by	Original release date
13	1	"The Spare Part"	Les Chatfield	Ronnie Taylor	4 January 1980
A leaky washing machine is only the start of the Barnes's problems. Peter's attempt to acquire the necessary replacement part is easier said than done, especially with British Rail involved.
14	2	"Just Cause or Impediment"	Les Chatfield	Ronnie Taylor	11 January 1980
Peter's lined up for best man duties, but first he needs a suit. Then there's the small matter of getting to the church on time.
15	3	"Look Who's Coming for Ever"	Les Chatfield	Ronnie Taylor	18 January 1980
When her brother and sister-in-law head for a fortnight's holiday in Benidorm, Sheila's Dad comes to stay with the Barneses. Peter isn't keen, but ends up hitting it off with the old man, who takes him for a round of golf.

=== Series 4 (1981) ===
No. overall	No. in series	Title	Directed by	Written by	Original release date
16	1	"Wheels"	Stuart Allen	Vince Powell	11 January 1981
Peter's asked to deliver the company chairman his car - a flash Mercedes. Giving it a quick drive around, he encounters a group of anti-car, anti-pollution protesters and is swiftly arrested alongside them.
17	2	"Match of the Day"	Stuart Allen	Vince Powell	18 January 1981
After managing to secure a ticket to a major international football match at Wembley, Peter manages to lose – and reacquire – his ticket numerous times. Will he make it to see the big game?
18	3	"The Train Now Standing"	Stuart Allen	Vince Powell	25 January 1981
Having discovered that the train he and Sheila catch into London has been cancelled, Peter heads to the offices of British Rail to demand changes.
19	4	"While the Cat's Away"	Stuart Allen	Vince Powell	1 February 1981
With Sheila away visiting her ill mother, Terry challenges Peter to prove he's still got what it takes and can chat up a lady in the pub. When he fails, Terry organises the pair a double-date at a Chinese restaurant.
20	5	"The Weekend"	Stuart Allen	Vince Powell	8 February 1981
Having bumped into an old army friend in the park, Peter and Sheila are invited to stay with him - 'Snogger' Sutcliffe - and his wife for the weekend at their country retreat.
21	6	"Rear Window"	Stuart Allen	Vince Powell	15 February 1981
Having failed to ingratiate himself with the new neighbours, Peter manages to sprain his ankle falling from a ladder. Sat in bed with little more to do than look out of the window, he soon becomes convinced that the short-tempered new neighbour has murdered his wife.

== Home media ==
The complete series was released on DVD by Network Distributing Limited on 4 May 2015.
