= Harry Worth (actor, born 1917) =

English comedy actor (1917–1989)

- The optical illusion from the opening titles of his BBC TV series Harry Worth
- Born: Harry Bourlon Illingsworth; 20 November 1917; Hoyland Common, West Riding of Yorkshire, England
- Died: 20 July 1989 (aged 71); Berkhamsted, Hertfordshire, England
- Occupation: Comedian
- Website: www.harryworth.co.uk

Harry Bourlon Illingsworth (20 November 1917 – 20 July 1989), professionally known as Harry Worth, was an English comedy actor, comedian and ventriloquist. Worth portrayed a charming, gentle and genial character, totally bemused by life, creating comedic confusion wherever he went.

== Early life ==
Worth was born in Hoyland Common, West Riding of Yorkshire, the youngest child of a miner. He had ten siblings. When he was only five months old, his father died from injuries resulting from an industrial accident. He left school at 14 and was a miner for eight years. He earned 2 shillings 2½ pence a day and worked near the lift in the mine; he said he hated every minute of it. He joined the Royal Air Force (RAF) in 1941.

As a teenager, he was in the Tankersley Amateur Dramatics Society and taught himself ventriloquism from a book he borrowed from the local library, buying his first dummy in 1936. During the Second World War, he performed in an RAF variety show in India and had extra material written for him by the show's director, Wallie Okin. Worth warned his audience beforehand that he was not very good: according to ITMA impressionist Peter Cavanagh, this was the start of his apologetic and inept style.

He was a variety act for many years before he became well known and was often at the bottom of any 'bill'. Having left the RAF, and adamant he would never go down the mines again, he started in show business with his first booking at the Bradford Mechanics' Institute in 1946. In 1947 he married his wife Kay and in 1948, like many other comedians from the forces, he got an audition at London's Windmill Theatre. Of 40 in the audition, he passed, along with Morecambe and Wise and Tony Hancock. He did six shows a day as comedian between fan dancers. In 1948 he also made his first radio appearance in a show New to You. He now had two dummies for his ventriloquist act, Fotheringay and Clarence, but meanwhile developed his performing voice.

He toured for two years with Laurel and Hardy towards the end of their careers. He said he could always go in and talk with them and they told him about Hollywood and their work there. When Oliver Hardy watched his show in Nottingham in 1952, he persuaded Worth to drop the ventriloquist routine and concentrate on becoming a comedian, which he then did. His first stage act without ventriloquism was in Newcastle. He continued to include ventriloquism in his cabaret act through his career, performing much of the material that he had used during the war. This included three appearances in the Royal Variety Show.

After appearing a number of times on Variety Bandbox, Worth gained his own radio show, Thirty Minutes Worth. He took his scripts seriously and did not ad lib. He said he built a style of dithering in his shows without even realising it.

== Television career ==
Worth's first television appearance was a five-minute standup on Henry Hall's Guest Night in 1955. He became well known to the public and even appeared at the London Palladium, after which he took the show to Manchester, the main place for variety in those days, for eight weeks. In 1960, the television programme The Trouble With Harry was broadcast. John Ammonds and Worth wrote the pilot script in three to four weeks. A series of six programmes was commissioned, and was written by Vince Powell, Ronnie Taylor and Frank Roscoe.

He made this style his own by creating a character with whom the public could connect. He once said, "If Harry [the character] ever looked directly at the camera, or the audience, it would all be over". The character was Harry and everyone saw Harry as Harry.

He is now best remembered for his 1960s series Here's Harry, later re-titled Harry Worth, which ran for 10 years and over 100 episodes (the longest running British sitcom of the time, and still one of only a handful to run for over 100 episodes). The opening titles of Harry Worth featured Worth stopping in the street to perform an optical trick involving a shop window: raising one arm and one leg which were reflected in the window, thus giving the impression of levitation. Reproducing this effect was popularly known as "doing a Harry Worth". The shop window sequence first used in Here's Harry was filmed at St Ann's Square, Manchester, at Hector Powes tailor's shop. The idea for this was suggested by Vince Powell, who had done it himself as a child.

One famous comic sketch involved Worth and his family preparing for a royal visit to the area, during which the Queen was to visit his house. His fussing about the house drove his family mad. Just before the Queen was due to arrive, a beggar arrived at the door and kept coming back as an increasingly frustrated Worth tried to get him to go away. When a knock came on the door one more time Worth grabbed a bucket of filthy water and threw it out of the door at the caller, only to find that it was not the beggar but the Queen standing there, and he had just soaked her. Another sketch involved Worth complaining to a policeman outside the Houses of Parliament that Big Ben clock was slow because Jimmy Young, the BBC Radio 2 presenter known for "always being right" had said that it was ten minutes past ten, while the clock said it was 10 am. After pestering the policeman, Worth had the clock moved forward by ten minutes. Just as the clock was changed, Young appeared on the radio to apologise that the studio clock was wrong by ten minutes. A mortified Worth was seen speeding away in his car, to furious shouts from the angry policeman.

Following the assassination of President Kennedy on 22 November 1963, the BBC screened Here's Harry as part of its regular programming, a decision which led to the broadcaster receiving complaints through over 2,000 phone calls and 500 letters and telegrams.

Although never scripted, his catchphrase was generally known as "My name is Harry Worth. I don't know why – but, there it is!" It was really invented by impressionists of the day to give a common ground tag line to work with. One running joke in the television show involved references to Harry's never seen aunt known only as "Auntie", the popular nickname for the BBC itself. In one show, Harry commissioned a portrait of Auntie, only to receive a head-and-shoulders print of a woman with no face. He was the subject of This Is Your Life in October 1963 when he was surprised by Eamonn Andrews at Manchester's Gaumont cinema.

By the early to mid-1980s Worth was forced by health problems to retire early from his shows, but he continued working in radio (and made television guest appearances from time to time for either interviews or pop-up guest appearances on some shows) until a few months before he died. Among the last regular appearances of his career were leading roles in the sitcoms How's Your Father? (Yorkshire TV 1979–1980) and Oh Happy Band! (BBC TV 1980).

Worth's last TV appearance was on Comic Relief in 1989 where he appeared with Melvyn Hayes in the BT Tower taking donation calls.

== Personal life ==
Worth married Kay (Daisy) Flynn, who was a principal boy, in 1947. They decided early on that he would continue with his act whilst Kay became a housewife. They had a long and happy marriage and she cared for him during his long illness with cancer. During this time, he referred to her as "Maggie Thatcher" for diligently watching his daily medication intake and exercises. After several short-lived recoveries, Worth finally succumbed to spinal cancer. He died at his home "Arisden" in Berkhamsted, Hertfordshire, on 20 July 1989, with his wife, daughter (Jobyna) and grandchildren (Dane and Emma-Jo) at his side. Kay lived on for another 10 years.

Worth resisted attempts by publishers to write his biography; it was over 16 years after his death before a book, My Name Is Harry Worth, by Roy Baines, was published.

== Legacy ==
At his memorial service, Sir Harry Secombe said "Harry has left a legacy of laughter and we have all been enriched by his presence here on Earth".

In October 2015, Barnsley-born actor, playwright and director Jack Land Noble (born 1989) brought Worth's life and career to the stage in the world premiere of My Name is Harry Worth. The show was billed as "a one-man tour-de-force written by and featuring Jack Land Noble as the forgotten son of British comedy. Hilarious yet poignant, My Name Is Harry Worth celebrates a pioneering comic talent in style." The play, which had the support of the Harry Worth estate, was first staged to great acclaim in Harry's hometown of Barnsley at the town's Lamproom Theatre, ahead of a prospective 2017 UK tour and run at the Edinburgh Festival Fringe marking Harry's centenary. Speaking to BBC Radio Sheffield, Jack Land Noble explained, "The time is ripe to bring Harry's distinct talent back into the public arena. The play is my humble tribute to my comedy idol: a dithering, surreal comic genius and, arguably, Yorkshire's finest comic son."

== Memorials ==
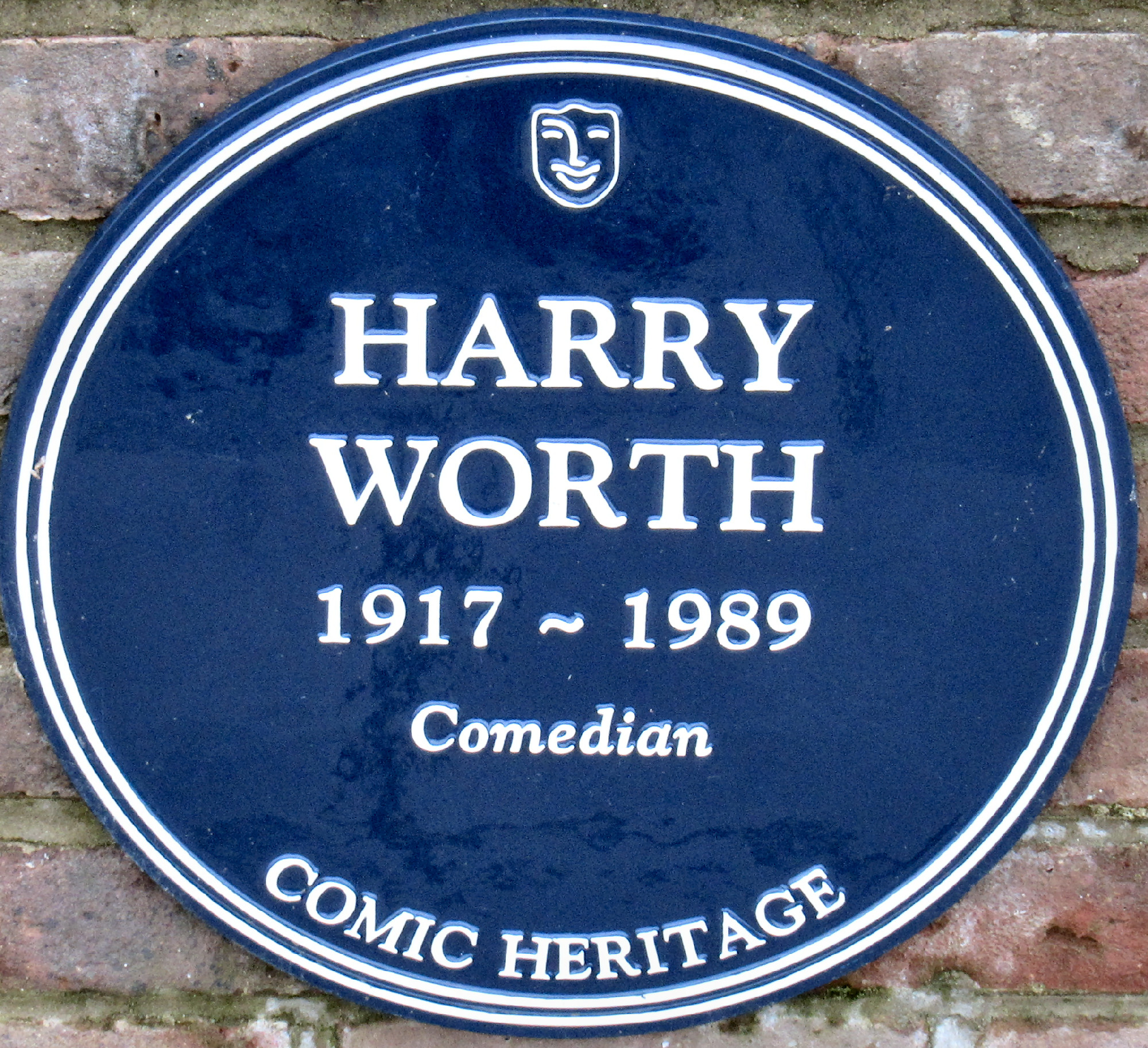
Comic Heritage plaque, Teddington

On 20 July 2010 a British Comedy Society blue plaque was unveiled by comedian Jimmy Cricket, a friend of Worth's, on the house where he was born in Hoyland Common. The unveiling was arranged in conjunction with Worth's biographer, Roy Baines, and the event was sponsored by Revelation Films, who released a DVD of Worth's work the same week. He has also been commemorated by plaques elsewhere, including those at Teddington Studios, BBC Television Centre and Blackpool Comedy Carpet.

== Television ==
- The Trouble with Harry (1960)
- Here's Harry (1960–1965)
- Harry Worth (1966–1970)
- Titipu, "the first colour TV production of The Mikado" (1967) – Ko-Ko
- Scoop (1972) – William Boot
- Thirty Minutes Worth (1972–1973)
- My Name Is Harry Worth (1974)
- How's Your Father? (1979–1980) – Harry Matthews
- Oh Happy Band! (1980) – (final appearance as lead character and last scripted television show)

== Theatre ==
- Here's Harry
- Harvey
- Pardon Me, Prime Minister
- See How They Run
- Norman, Is That You?

== Radio ==
- Workers Playtime
- Thirty Minutes Worth
- Harry Worth in Things Could Be Worse
- We're in Business (1959-1960, with Peter Jones (actor), broadcast on the BBC Home Service)
