= My Name Is Harry Worth =

1974 British sitcom

- Opening titles
- Genre: Sitcom
- Written by: George Layton; Jonathan Lynn; Ronnie Taylor
- Directed by: William G. Stewart
- Starring: Harry Worth; Lally Bowers
- Composer: Nachum Heiman
- Country of origin: United Kingdom
- Original language: English
- No. of series: 1
- No. of episodes: 8

Production
- Producer: William G. Stewart
- Running time: 30 minutes
- Production company: Thames Television

Original release
- Network: ITV
- Release: 22 April – 17 June 1974

My Name Is Harry Worth is a British comedy television series that originally aired on ITV in a series of eight episodes in 1974. It starred Harry Worth and Lally Bowers as his landlady Mrs Maybury. Worth plays a mild-mannered, well meaning man who ends up in a series of unlikely adventures. Three of the episodes were scripted by the writing team of George Layton and Jonathan Lynn. The series was made at Teddington Studios, and the opening credits were shot outside the nearby Strawberry Hill railway station.

Actors who appeared in episodes of the series included Gerald Sim, Sally Geeson, Reginald Marsh, David Lodge, Glyn Houston, Derek Francis, Peter Jones, Harry Littlewood, John Lyons, Derek Newark, Norman Mitchell and Robert Raglan.

== Cast ==
- Harry Worth as Harry
- Lally Bowers as Mrs Maybury
- James Appleby as patrolman
- Reginald Marsh as George Bailey
- Irene Peters as girl
- Tim Barrett as Mr Regan
- John Bindon as constable
- Anthony Chinn as Chinese waiter
- John Clegg as shop assistant
- Derek Francis as Arnold Hobbs
- Glyn Houston as PC Jackson
- Peter Jones as Mr Bunting
- Harry Littlewood as TV reporter
- David Lodge as Inspector Brown

== Bibliography ==
- Walker, Craig. On The Buses: The Complete Story. Andrews UK Limited, 2011.
