= Johnny Roadhouse =

Manchester saxophonist and music shop owner

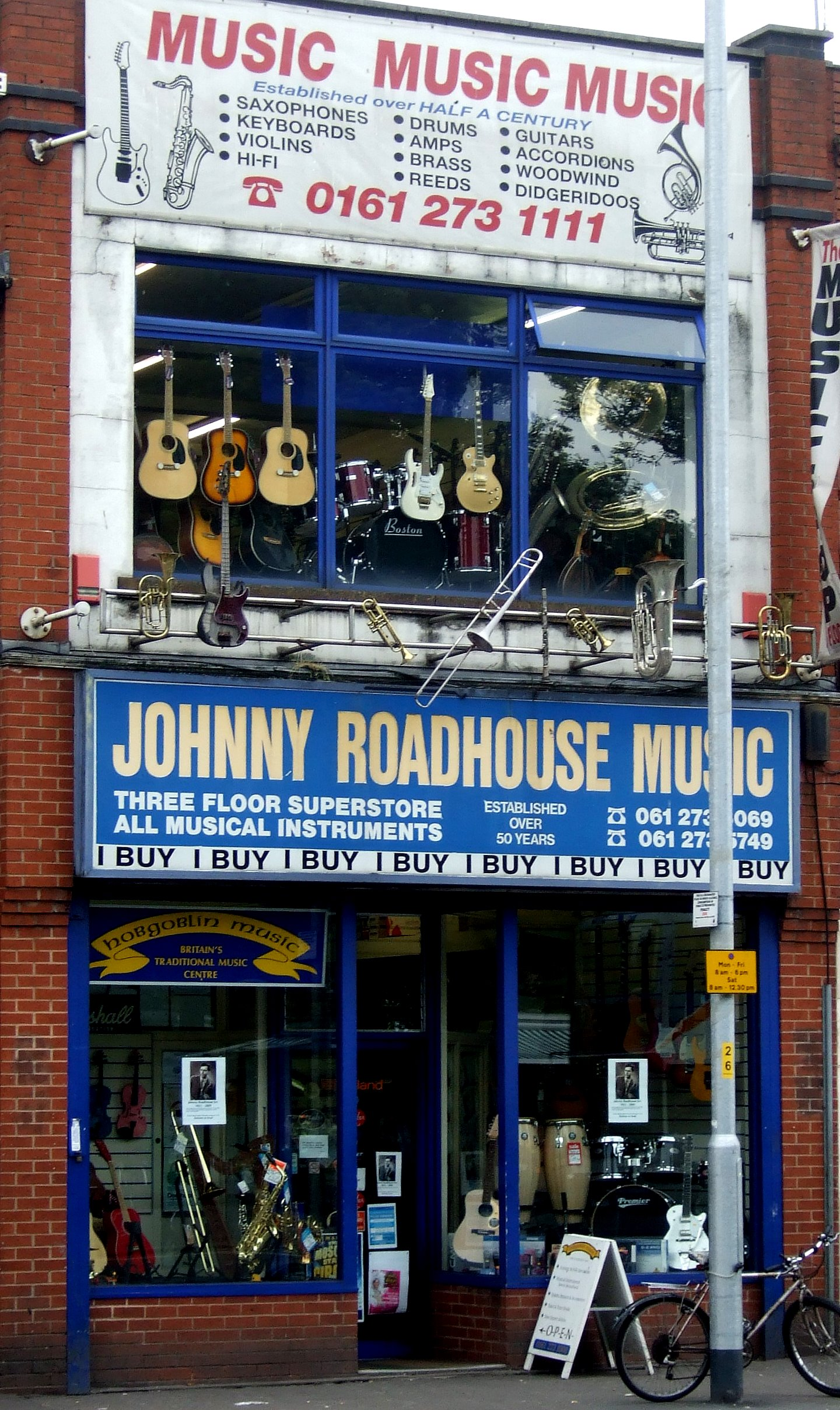
Johnny Roadhouse Music, Oxford Road, Manchester, 2009

John Roadhouse (13 January 1921 – 11 April 2009) was a British musician who specialised in saxophone.

== Biography ==
Roadhouse was born in Sheffield, but lived in Moss Side, Manchester from an early age. He taught himself how to play the saxophone. Originally an aircraft fitter with Metropolitan-Vickers at Trafford Park, he began to play with local dance groups during his spare evenings. He got his first big break when he became a member of the Teddy Foster Orchestra in 1948. He later went on to join the BBC Northern Variety Orchestra in 1953. In 1962 he helped establish the ABC Television Orchestra with musical director Bob Sharples and ABC's Supervisor of Light Entertainment Ronnie Taylor.

He opened up his music store, Johnny Roadhouse Music in 1955 on Oxford Road in the Chorlton-on-Medlock area of Manchester. His store became a cornerstone for Manchester music and was used by several famous musicians and groups including Paul McCartney, Oasis and The Smiths. In his retirement he passed the running of the store over to his son, John Roadhouse.

He was presented with a Lifetime Achievement award by the Lord Mayor of Manchester in 2005. He died on 11 April 2009.
