= Vem vet mest? =

Swedish game show based on the popular British show Fifteen to One

- Created by: John M. Lewis
- Presented by: Johan Wester
- Country of origin: Sweden
- Original language: Swedish
- No. of series: 17

Production
- Producer: Joakim Hugoson
- Running time: 27 minutes
- Production company: SVT

Original release
- Network: SVT2; SVT2 HD
- Release: 25 August 2008

Vem vet mest? was a Swedish game show based on the popular British show Fifteen to One. It aired on SVT2 every Monday through Friday at 7pm, with Johan Wester as host.

The game consisted of three rounds with questions, starting with eight contestants of which three reach the final round. Two of the finalists from Monday through Thursday's shows went through to the Friday Final. The winner of that final received a prize of 10 000 SEK.

The show started in August 2008 and ran until 2020. Rickard Olsson hosted from 2008 to 2017, and was replaced by Wester in 2018.

There is also a children's version, Vem vet mest junior.
