= How's Your Father? =

British TV sitcom (1979–1980)

- Genre: Sitcom
- Created by: Pam Valentine; Michael Ashton
- Starring: Harry Worth
- Country of origin: United Kingdom
- No. of series: 2
- No. of episodes: 13

Production
- Running time: 30 minutes
- Production company: Yorkshire Television

Original release
- Network: ITV
- Release: 27 February 1979 – 29 August 1980

How's Your Father? is a Yorkshire Television comedy series, starring the comedian Harry Worth, originally broadcast 1979–1980.

The series was created by Michael Ashton and Pam Valentine, who had co-created and written two of Yorkshire Television's other smash-hit sitcoms, You're Only Young Twice (1977–1981) and That's My Boy (1981–1986).

== Plot ==
Worth starred as middle-aged Harry Matthews, recently widowed, who was struggling to cope with his two teenage children.

The series ran for two series, 13 episodes in all, from February 1979 to August 1980.

== Episodes ==
=== Series 1 ===
- "The Older Woman" (27 February 1979)
- "Trouble With Shirley" (6 March 1979)
- "The Dress, The Shirt And The Mower" (13 March 1979)
- "Harry Gets Out More" (20 March 1979)
- "Who Wants To Move?" (27 March 1979)
- "Wedding Bells" (3 April 1979)

=== Series 2 ===
- "The Disco" (18 July 1980)
- "Help!" (25 July 1980)
- "The One That Got Away" (1 August 1980)
- "Rag Week" (8 August 1980)
- "Fantasy Time" (15 August 1980)
- "The Promotion" (22 August 1980)
- "Every Picture Tells A Story" (29 August 1980)
