= Ingebrigt Steen Jensen =

Norwegian writer

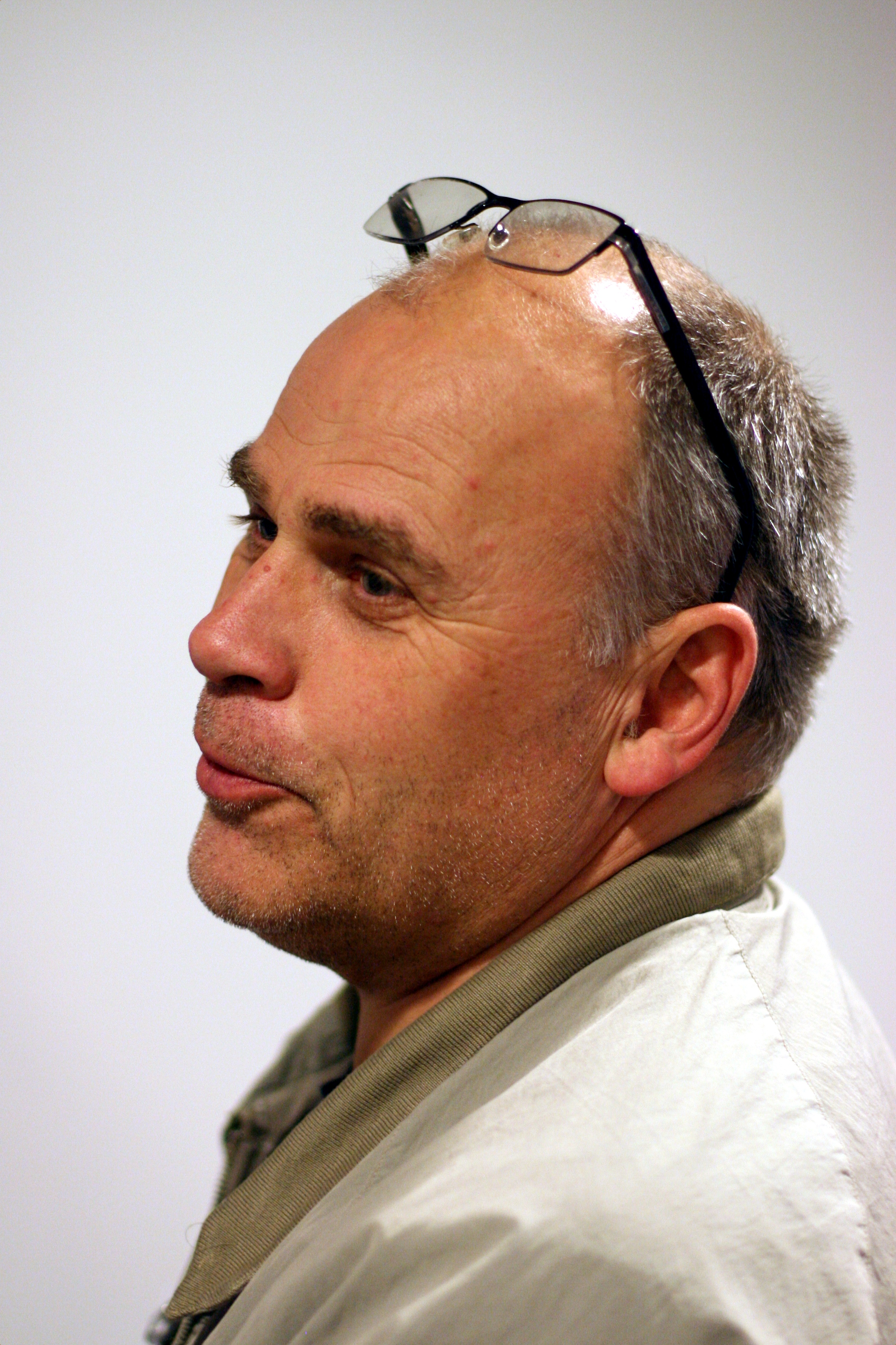
- Born: 9 May 1955 (age 70)
- Known for: writer, consultant, advertising man and football enthusiast

Ingebrigt Steen Jensen (born 9 May 1955) is a Norwegian writer, consultant, advertising man and football official.

Steen Jensen is educated at the University of Oslo where he studied English, Norwegian, and political science.

He has worked in advertising since 1982. During the 1990s Steen Jensen took part in the building of JBR advertising agency, which was sold to IPG (InterPublic Group) under the name McCann-Erickson Advertising; now known as McCann Worldgroup, Norway, and Dinamo. He has worked both for and in Stabæk Fotball for a number of years. He is otherwise known for his book Ona fyr ("Ona lighthouse") from 2002, which is about leadership, leadership techniques and motivation. He is also a sought-after motivational speaker and lecturer.

Since the late 1990s he has participated in several television programs, as well as being the host for a quiz show on TV Norge.
