= Ronnie Taylor (scriptwriter) =

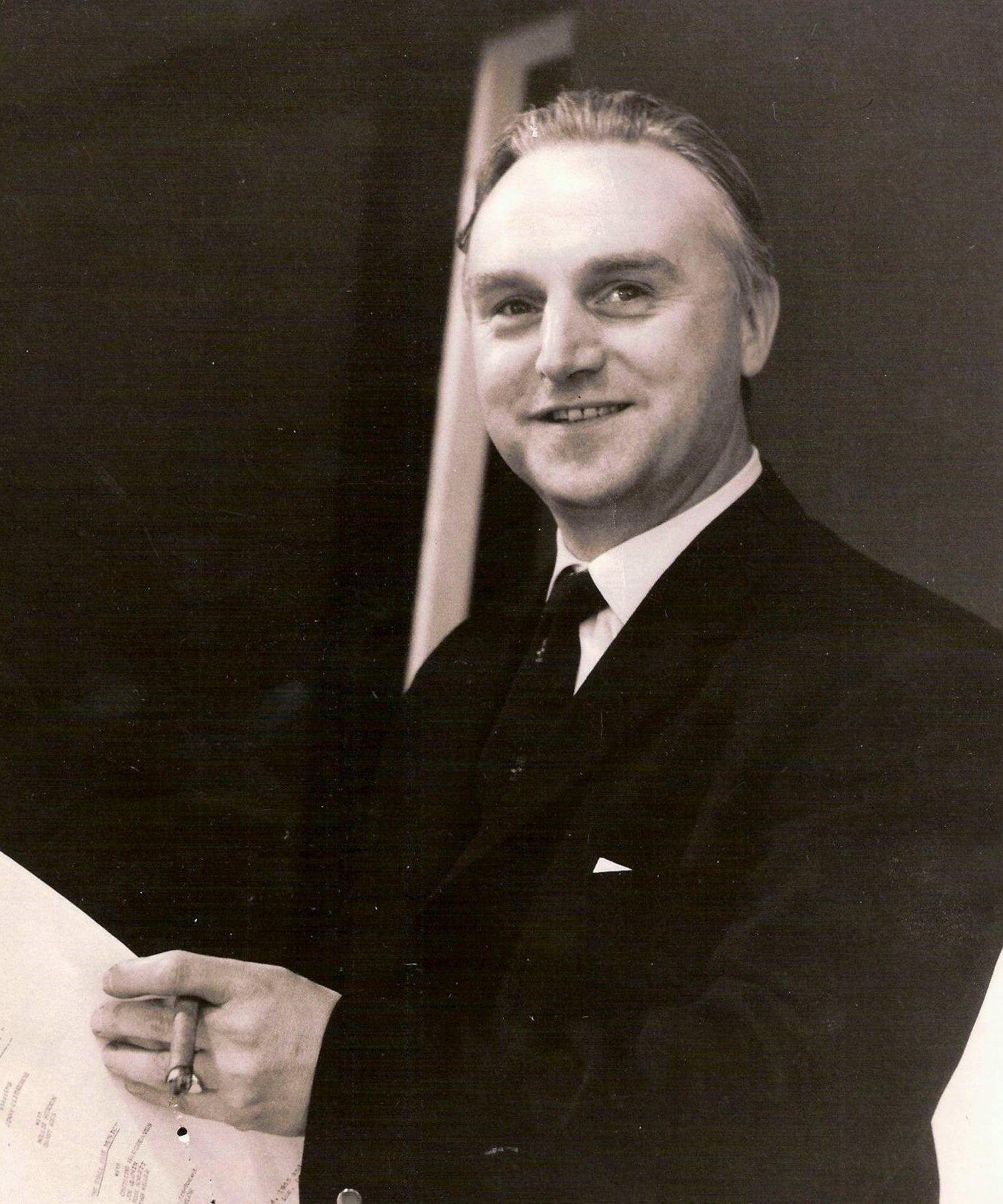
- Ronnie Taylor in 1965 at an ABC TV recording of Just Jimmy
- Born: 28 June 1921; Leigh, Lancashire, England
- Died: 9 September 1979 (aged 58)
- Occupations: Scriptwriter; producer; director

Ronnie Taylor (28 June 1921 – 9 September 1979) was an English television and radio comedy scriptwriter, producer and director.

== Early life ==
Born in Leigh, Lancashire (now Greater Manchester), Taylor left school at 14 to join his family's firm of insurance brokers. He taught himself to play the piano and guitar and became involved with amateur dramatics/musicals. He formed a vocal group and wrote sketches and songs and became a founder member of "The Kordites". In 1941, he joined RAF Signals and served in North Africa and Italy where he also wrote and produced service entertainment.

== BBC ==
After the war he was auditioned at BBC Manchester by Bowker Andrews, producer, and initially mistaken as the tuner for the studio Bechstein piano. He was offered a 13-week job writing continuity for Gracie Fields. Fields introduced Taylor to her protégé variety performer Norman Evans and Taylor was contracted to write the radio series Over the Garden Wall, for which Evans is best remembered. He wrote radio series for 'Old Mother Riley' (Arthur Lucan and Kitty McShane) and worked with comedians Jimmy James, Robb Wilton, Dave Morris and Albert Modley.

In 1950, he began his long association with Al Read and the BBC Radio series Variety Fanfare (1950-1952) recorded at Hulme Hippodrome which showcased new comedy talent including Ken Platt, Morecambe and Wise and Ken Dodd.

In 1951, Taylor was appointed as a producer with BBC North Region Variety following the death of Bowker Andrews, including producing Variety Fanfare.

In 1952, Taylor trained as a television director at BBC's Lime Grove Studios, and brought Home James with Jimmy James and Club Night with Dave Morris/Variety Northern Showground to TV.

== Freelance and ABC TV ==
In 1959, he began Taylor-Vision, TV and Radio Production Company and in 1960 Taylor produced the British version of Candid Camera. He began a 19-year relationship as writer for Harry Worth through series with BBC Manchester and London and Thames Television.

In 1961, Taylor was appointed Supervisor of Light Entertainment at ABC, working with Jimmy Clitheroe and Al Read and on programmes, Blackpool Night Out and Comedy Bandbox. While there he helped establish the ABC Television Orchestra with Bob Sharples and Johnny Roadhouse.

== Freelance in London and ATV ==
In 1962, Taylor began to work in London continuing as a writer for Harry Worth. He was writer for the Val Doonican series and wrote words and music routines for Cilla, an early Cilla Black television series.

In the 1970s, he wrote for ATV. This period included his work on the sitcom My Good Woman with Leslie Crowther and Sylvia Syms, It's All in Life for Al Read, Cilla's Comedy Six and Cilla's World of Comedy (winner of Pye Comedy Award) for Cilla Black, Big Boy Now, another series for Leslie Crowther, this time with Fabia Drake, and A Sharp Intake of Breath, which features David Jason, Alun Armstrong and Richard Wilson. As producer he supervised The Masterspy game show with William Franklyn. He was also Comedy Consultant for ATV throughout the 1970s.

== Archive ==
In 2014, Taylor's collection of scripts, recordings, documents, photographs and letters were donated to The Victoria and Albert Museum, Theatre and Performance Collection, London by Irene, Susan and Diane Taylor.
