= Trevor Montague =

British author (born 1954)

Trevor Howard Montague (born 20 May 1954) is a British author who compiles books of facts. Best known for A to Z of Almost Everything, he has since compiled A to Z of Sport, A to Z of Britain and Ireland and A to Z of British (and Irish) Popular Culture. He is also a prolific game show contestant, with victories in Today's the Day and Fifteen to One, although the latter victory resulted in legal action as Montague was ineligible to win. Montague founded the British Quiz Association in 2001.

Montague first appeared on Fifteen to One in 1990 and was eliminated. In 1992 he entered again under a false name, Steve Romana, and wearing a disguise, in breach of the show's rules. Montague's eligibility was only called into question after a viewer spotted him during a rerun of the show on Challenge. A judge found the case proven against Montague and awarded damages. He made an appearance on Who Wants to Be a Millionaire? in 2005, where he won £1,000 after getting the £32,000 question wrong by going with 72% of the studio audience.

== Works ==
- The Daily Telegraph A to Z of Almost Everything: A Compendium of General Knowledge (ISBN 0-316-73137-4)
- The Daily Telegraph A to Z of Sport: The Compendium of Sporting Knowledge (ISBN 0-316-72645-1)
- A to Z of Britain and Ireland: (Almost) Everything You Ever Needed to Know About the History and Heritage of Our Islands (ISBN 1-847-44087-8)
