= Sławomir (musician) =

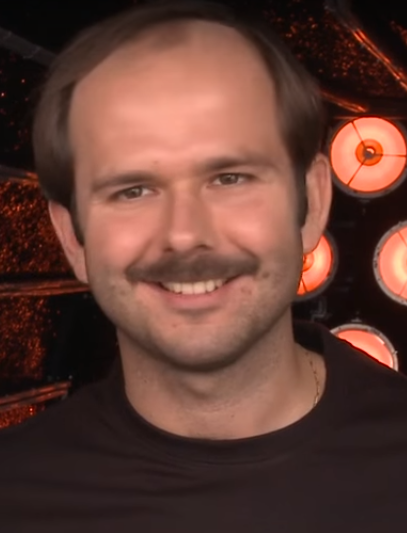
- Sławomir in 2016

Background information
- Born: Sławomir Paweł Zapała; 19 March 1983 (age 43); Kraków, Poland
- Genres: Rock-polo
- Instruments: Acoustic and electric guitar
- Years active: 2014–present
- Member of: Trzymamy się Zapały
- Spouse: Magdalena Kajrowicz

Sławomir Paweł Zapała (born 19 March 1983) is a Polish singer-songwriter, showman, actor, and television presenter.

== Life and career ==
Zapała was born on 19 March 1983 in Kraków. In his youth, he watched Telewizja Polska's Television Theatre and frequently visited the House of Culture in Nowa Huta. In 2006, he graduated from the AST National Academy of Theatre Arts in Kraków, and starred in numerous films and television series, including Karol: A Man Who Became Pope, 33 Scenes from Life, The Mighty Angel, Days of Honor, True Law, Father Matthew, The Lousy World, and Na dobre i na złe. He also performed in several theatres.

In 2014 he created the musical persona Sławomir, which he invented during his stay on Long Island in New York, where, as a performer in The Watermill Center, he gained the recognition of other Polish immigrants. That year, he released his debut single, "Megiera". In 2016, he performed on the show Dancing with the Stars. Taniec z gwiazdami, followed by Twoja twarz brzmi znajomo in 2017. For the final of the season in which he performed, he acted as Freddie Mercury, gaining the attention of Queen guitarist Brian May.

In 2018 Zapała released the album The Greatest Hits, reaching number one on the OLiS sales chart and being certified 4× platinum in 2021. On 23 April 2017, he released the single Miłość w Zakopanem, which reached number four on the OLiS chart and was certified 4× diamond in 2021. On 31 December 2017, he performed at TVP2's New Year's Eve Concert in Zakopane. In 2018, he co-hosted the TVP1 game show Big Music Quiz, and, in 2019, co-hosted the Polsat show Piosenki z drugiej ręki.

In 2022 Zapała co-hosted the Zoom TV morning show Poranny rogal and hosted the TVP2 show Tak to leciało! from 2022 to 2024.

== Music and style ==
Zapała has been described as the "king" of the musical genre "rock-polo", a combination of the rock and disco polo genres. He is also part of a band called Trzymamy się Zapały.

== Personal life ==
Zapała married the actor and musician Magdalena Kajrowicz in 2011; they have had one child together, Kordian (b. 2016). He is a Christian.

== Filmography ==
Zapała has performed in the following films and television series:

=== Film ===
Year	Title	Role
2004	Długi weekend	Person baptised at religious meeting
2004	Karol: A Man Who Became Pope	Jarko Sisyl
2006	Jarecki	Friend from Słupsk
2006	Pope John Paul II	Seminarist
2007	Twists of Fate	Police inspector
2008	W pułapce	Alojzy Białas
2008	33 Scenes from Life	Waiter
2009	Popieluszko: Freedom Is Within Us	Young Milicja Obywatelska member
2009	Ostatnia akcja	Nervous police officer
2011	Entanglement	Gienio
2012	Piąta pora roku	Police officer
2013	1939 Battle of Westerplatte	Antonio Ozorowski
2013	Podejrzani zakochani	Wiktor
2014	The Mighty Angel	Husband of the queen of Kent
2015	Król życia	Rudolf
2016	Planet Single	Sławomir
2016	I'm a Killer	Sylwek
2017	Porady na zdrady	Man tested in park
2017	Letters to Santa 3	Man beside taxicab
2017	Ready for Everything. Exterminator	Percussionist
2018	Playing Hard	Łukasz Leoś
2019	Futro z misia	Fojcik
2022	The Taming of the Shrew	Włodziu
2023	The Taming of the Shrew 2	Włodziu

=== Television ===
Year	Title	Role	Notes
1993	Tajemnica dzwonka szkolnego	Figus	Television play
1994	Thumbelina	Elf	Television play
1997	Skarb szeryfa	Chimpanzee	Television play
2005	The Clan	Dominik	Appears in episodes 933 and 957
2006	Dwie strony medalu	Tomek	
2007	Egzamin z życia	Waiter	Appears in episodes 88 and 90
2007	Determinator	Maciej Gmerek	Appears in episode 12
2008	Trzeci oficer	Witek	Appears in episode 5
2008	Hela w opałach	Police officer	Appears in episode 50
2009	Synowie	Pokorka	Appears in episodes 2, 4, and 10
2009; 2011; 2012	Father Matthew	Shoe factory worker (episode 23); Waiter (episode 84); Bartosz (episode 102)	Appears in episodes 23, 84, and 102
2009–2020	Blondynka	Paweł	
2010–2013	Hotel 52	Unnamed assistant cook (episodes 3–19); Assistant cook Żenia (episodes 28–91)	
2010–2011	Prosto w serce	Chudy	
2011	Days of Honor	German man	Appears in episode 47
2012	The Lousy World	Father Bączek (episode 390); Man (episode 389); Udo (episode 388)	Appears in episodes 388, 389, and 390
2012	True Law	Rychu Lipiec	Appears in episode 12
2012–2014	Piąty Stadion	Mieczysław; Wiesław Zapalny (episode 144 only)	
2013	Barwy szczęścia	Father Anselm	Appears in episodes 935, 961, and 1002
2015	Prokurator	Funeral company worker	Appears in episode 7
2015	Powiedz tak!	Company worker	Appears in episodes 4 and 5
2015; 2021–2024	Na dobre i na złe	Bolek; Edward Kordoń (episode 610 only)	
2016	Dwoje we troje	Michał	Appears in episodes 10 and 52
2017	Komisarz Alex	Filipek	Appears in episode 110
2021	Misja	Sławomir Quatro	Appears in episode 9
2023	Tylko nie piątek!	Himself	Appears in episode 18
2023	Swaci	Wedding organizer	Appears in episode 12

== Discography ==
=== Albums ===
Zapała has released the following albums:

Title	Release date
The Greatest Hits	7 April 2017
The Best Of	13 October 2020
Cudowronek	2025

=== Singles ===
He has also released the following singles:

Year	Title
2015	"Megiera"
2015	"Ni mom hektara"
2016	"Aneta"
2017	"Pierwsza gwiazda"
2019	"Weekendowy korsarz"
2020	"Weselny pyton"
2020	"Totalny Love"
2022	"Andrzej"
2023	"Cudowronek"
2023	"240/h"
2023	"Kolorowy film"
2024	"Tańcz" (featuring Zenon Martyniuk)
