= Familiada =

Polish television game show

- Created by: Mark Goodson
- Directed by: Grzegorz Warchoł
- Presented by: Karol Strasburger
- Opening theme: Main Street U.S.A by John Hobbs
- Ending theme: Lordy, Lordy! by Al Capps
- Country of origin: Poland
- Original language: Polish
- No. of episodes: 3,133

Production
- Executive producer: Ryszard Krajewski
- Running time: 24–28 minutes

Original release
- Network: TVP2
- Release: 17 September 1994 – present

Familiada (Family Olympics) is a Polish television game show, based on the American game show Family Feud. It started airing the show in 1994 on TVP2. It is hosted by actor Karol Strasburger. The biggest prize on the show is currently 25,000 złoty. From January 1, 1999 to September 21, 2019 it was 15,000 złoty. Until 1995, the award was 100,000,000 old złoty (equivalent of 10,000 new złoty). It is shown on every Saturday and Sunday at 14:00 (CET).

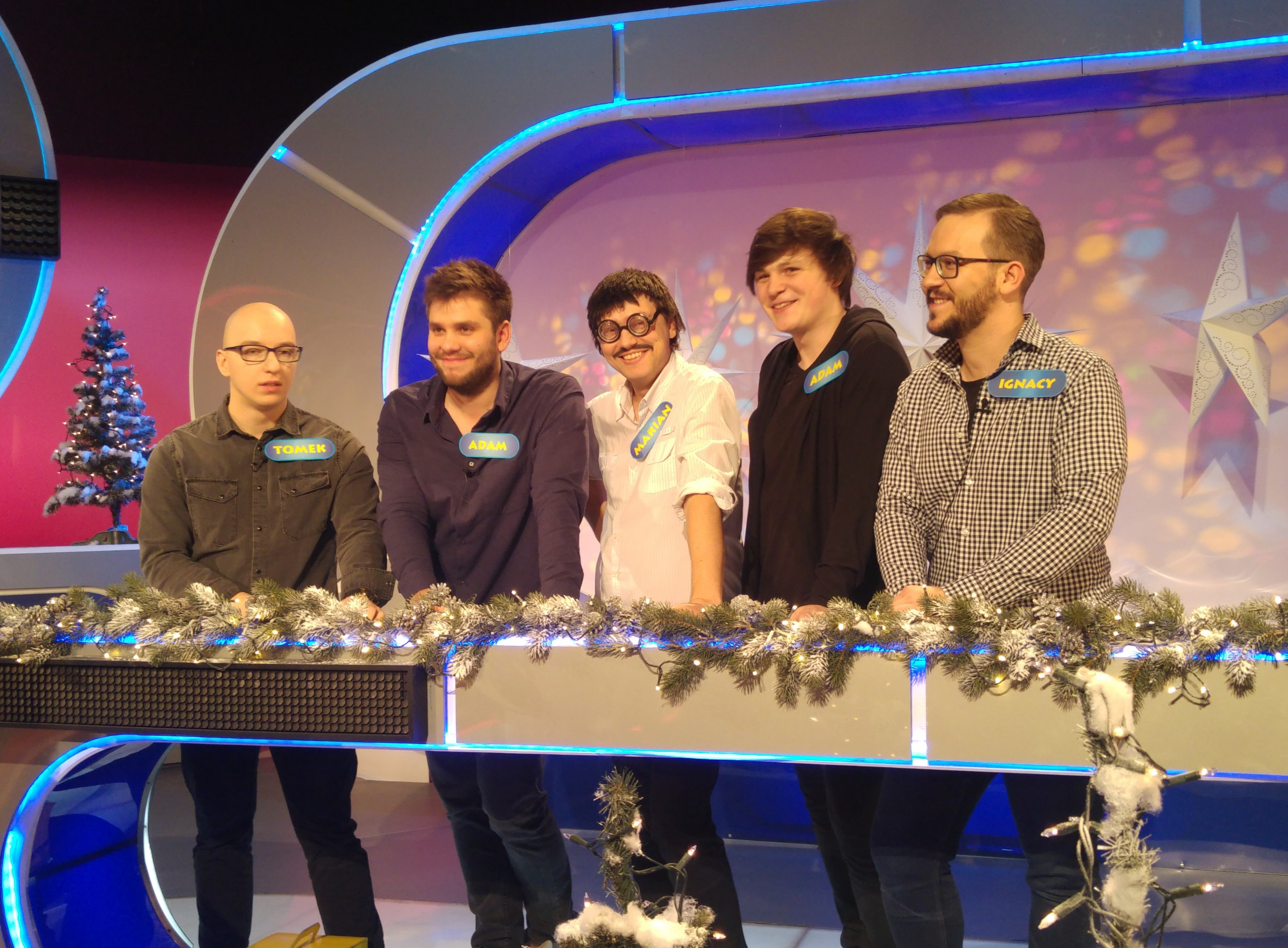
Polish YouTubers in the set of Familiada

== Gameplay ==
For rules of the game, see the article entitled Family Feud, as this article only describes the slight differences in the Polish version of the show.

The show uses similar rules to the American version from the time this version premiered (the 1993-94 season) and has only adopted one rule change in September 2019.

In 2020, because of the pandemic, one temporary rule change was made. Podium spacing restrictions mean only three players per family. The face-off podium is separated by acrylic, unlike the North American versions (United States and Canada), where the podium was widened to ensure separation between players and the host.

Round Format: The format is three single point rounds, then one double point round, then all subsequent rounds are triple point rounds. Additional triple point rounds are played until a family reaches 300 points.

Face-Off: Until September 2019, the winner of the face-off played the round. Starting with the September 22, 2019 episode the rules were changed to match the current American rule in effect since 1999, where the winner could choose to play or pass.

Steal: The value of the answer used in a successful steal is added to the family's score (the rule in effect on the American version at the time of the Polish version's debut, dropped in 2003 in the US version; this rule is still enforced in the Polish version).

Prize Money: Each point is worth three złoty (25,000 old złoty in 1994, 2.5 new złoty between 1995 and 1998), and is paid regardless of the result. Both the winning and losing families are paid.

Fast Money: Pre-1994 time rules are in effect. The first player has 15 seconds and the second player has 20 seconds, compared to 20 and 25 seconds, respectively, in the modern American version in 1994. Winning Fast Money awards 25,000 złoty (100 million old złoty in 1994, 10,000 new złoty between 1995 and 1998, 15,000 new złoty between 1 January 1999 and 21 September 2019). Otherwise, the family wins three złoty for each point (25,000 old złoty in 1994, 2.5 new złoty between 1995 and 1998).
