= Don't Forget the Lyrics! =

Music game show

- Created by: Jeff Apploff
- Original work: Don't Forget the Lyrics! (United States)
- Owner: Banijay Entertainment
- Years: 2007–present

Don't Forget the Lyrics! is an international music game show. The original American show aired on Fox from July 11, 2007, to June 19, 2009, and after a year off the air, a third overall season, and first as a syndicated show, began on June 15, 2010, in daytime syndication and in primetime on VH1 and in primetime on MyNetworkTV on October 5, 2010. On March 24, 2011, the show was canceled. A new primetime version, hosted by Niecy Nash, debuted on FOX on May 23, 2022. The show has spun off to numerous countries outside America using different top prize or game format.

The primary difference between Don't Forget the Lyrics! and other music-based game shows is that artistic talent (such as the ability to sing or dance in an aesthetically pleasing way) is irrelevant to the contestants' chances of winning. In the words of one of their commercials prior to the first airing, "You don't have to sing it well; you just have to sing it right".

== Gameplay ==
Each game is played by a single contestant who earns money incrementally based on a payout ladder by completing missing song lyrics on up to ten songs, testing the contestant's memory on songs. The following description of the show is based primarily on the American version of Don't Forget the Lyrics!, though the general format applies to all international versions.

The contestant is presented and chooses from a set of nine different genres or categories. Two different songs (some versions presented three) were then presented to the contestant to choose one to sing, then the host informs the number of missing words the contestant will have to provide. The band or an ensemble will play the music and sings along, karaoke-style until the music stops, in which the monitor will display blank lines. The contestant then fills in the missing lyrics and chooses to either risk their accumulated winnings by locking in the lyrics or end the game and keep any accumulated winnings. To advance to the next level, all the lyrics must be correct, otherwise the game ends and the contestant leaves with the last guaranteed amount or nothing depending on the level they lost.

The contestant is also presented with three "Backups" to help, each usable once throughout a game:

- Backup Singer: The contestant receive assistance from one of two support members (or in some versions, an audience member) to help the contestant. The contestant may opt to choose their own lyrics or go with their backup singer's lyrics if it is different.
- Two Words: The contestant chooses any two of the missing words; the correct words for those positions are shown.
- Three Lines: The contestant is shown three lines of lyrics, among which one is correct.

The contestant has no choice over the tenth and final song (usually with the generic genre mentioning the top prize amount, such as the "Million Dollar Song"), which is not revealed unless they risk their winnings and play on. In most versions, any unused backups before the final song are rendered unavailable to use. If the contestant completes the final lyric correctly, he or she wins the grand prize that varies from country to country.

== International versions ==
Currently airing franchise

| Country/Region | Name | Host | Channel | Date aired | Top prize |
|---|---|---|---|---|---|
| Algeria | اسمع صوتك; Essma3 Saoutek | Brahim Ghazali | Samira TV; Zahra TV | January 20, 2020 (season 1); March 24, 2023 (season 2) | DA 1,000,000 |
| Austria | Sing and Win! | Rainhard Fendrich | ATV | March 6, 2008 – 2009 | €50,000 |
| Bulgaria | Помниш ли текста? Pomnish li teksta? | Kerana | bTV | November 5, 2024 – May 22, 2025 | 50,000лв |
| Canada (Quebec) | On connaît la chanson! | Mario Tessier | TVA | September 25, 2011 | Can$ 200,000 |
| Chile | ¡No te olvides de la canción! | Rafael Araneda | Chilevisión | August 6, 2012 – December 21, 2012 | Ch$20,000,000 |
| Croatia | Ne zaboravi stihove! | Igor Mešin | Nova TV | March 17, 2008 | kn 500,000 |
| Denmark | Så det synger | Michael Carøe | TV2 | March 22, 2008 | DKr 500,000 |
| Egypt | فاكر ولا لأ؟ Faker wella la? | Amir Karara | ERT 2 NTN | 2009 | LE 250,000 |
| France | N'oubliez pas les paroles! | Nagui | France 2 | December 15, 2007 – present | € 100,000 (2007–2013, 2014) € 20,000 (2013–) |
| Greece | Δεν εχω λογια! Den echo logia! | Giorgos Kapoutzidis | Mega Channel | 2015–2016 | €10,000 |
| Greece | Don't Forget the Lyrics! | Elli Kokkinou | ANT1 | October 5, 2025 – July 2, 2026 | €15,000 |
| India | Bol Baby Bol | Adnan Sami | Life OK | November 9, 2007 – April 11, 2008 | Rs. 2,500,000/- |
| Indonesia | Missing Lyrics | Irgi Achmad Fahrezi | Trans TV | May 12, 2008 – December 3, 2010 | Rp. 100,000,000 |
| Iran | شعر یادت نره; Sher yadet nare | Omid Khalili Tajrishi | Manoto 1 | September 14, 2012 | US$10,000 |
| Italy | Canta e Vinci | Amadeus and Checco Zalone | Italia 1 | 2007–2008 | €250,000 |
| Italy | Don't Forget the Lyrics! - Stai sul pezzo | Gabriele Corsi | NOVE | February 7, 2022 – June 3, 2025 | €5,000 (series 1–5) €10,000 (series 6–7) |
| Malaysia | Jangan Lupa Lirik! | Aznil Nawawi | Astro Ria | May 25, 2008 – 2011 | RM 1,000,000 |
| Mexico | ¿Te la sabes? Cántala | Chuck Pereda | Azteca 7 | October 10, 2007 | Mex$500,000 |
| Montenegro | Prave riječi | Nikola Đuričko | TV Vijesti | 2012 | €5,000 |
| Myanmar | Don't Forget the Lyrics Myanmar | Kaung Htet Zaw | MRTV-4 | March 2, 2024 – present | Ks200,000 |
| Nigeria | Don't Forget the Lyrics | Kamal Salau | All Major stations | 2008 | ₦20,000,000 |
| Norway | Kan du teksten? | Tshawe Baqwa and Yosef Wolde-Mariam | TV2 | 2008–2009 | NKr 500,000 |
| Poland | Tak to leciało! | Maciej Miecznikowski | TVP2 | March 9, 2008 – June 3, 2012 | zł 150,000 (series 1–8) zł 100,000 (series 9) |
| Poland | Tak to leciało! | Sławomir Zapała and Magdalena "Kajra" Kajrowicz (2022–2024) | TVP2 | September 4, 2022 – present | zł 100,000 |
| Poland | Tak to leciało! | Kacper Kuszewski (2024–present) | TVP2 | September 4, 2022 – present | zł 100,000 |
| Portugal | Não te Esqueças da Letra! | João Paulo Rodrigues | RTP1 | March 14, 2021 – July 25, 2021 | €10,000 |
| Russia | Из песни слов не выкинешь Iz pesni slov ne vykinesh | Vyacheslav Manucharov | NTV | August 31, 2013 | Main prize: Flat in Moscow |
| Singapore | Don't Forget the Lyrics! | Gurmit Singh; Adrian Pang (Comic Mayham episode) | MediaCorp Channel 5 | November 27, 2008 | S$500,000 |
| Singapore | 我要唱下去 | Sam Tseng | MediaCorp Channel 8 | August 25, 2009 | S$500,000 |
| Singapore | 我要唱下去 (名人版) | Mark Lee | MediaCorp Channel 8 | June 1, 2010 | S$50,000 |
| Slovakia | LYRICS - Vyspievaj si milión! | Andrej Bičan | TV JOJ | February 22, 2008 | Sk 1,000,000 |
| Spain | ¡No te olvides de la canción! | Àngel Llàcer | La Sexta | September 26, 2008 | €100,000 |
| Taiwan | 百萬大歌星; Million Singer | Harlem Yu | TTV | May 10, 2008 – August 11, 2012 | NT$300,000 |
| Tunisia | لسه فاكر; Lessa faker | Sami Fehri | El Hiwar El Tounsi | September 22, 2015 | DT 20,000 |
| United Kingdom | Don't Forget the Lyrics! | Shane Richie | Sky1 | May 11, 2008 – August 9, 2009 | £250,000 |
| United States (original format) | Don't Forget the Lyrics! | Wayne Brady | FOX | July 11, 2007 – June 19, 2009 | US$1,000,000 |
| United States (original format) | Don't Forget the Lyrics! | Niecy Nash | FOX | May 23, 2022 – present | US$1,000,000 |
| United States (original format) | Don't Forget the Lyrics! | Mark McGrath | Syndication | June 15, 2010 – May 27, 2011 | US$50,000 |
| Vietnam | Trò chơi âm nhạc – Don't Forget the Lyrics! | Nguyên Khang; Quốc Minh | VTV3 | November 7, 2012 – December 30, 2015 | 100.000.000VND |

== See also ==
- The Singing Bee (American game show) - another lyrics-themed game show
- The Lyrics Board - another lyrics-themed game show
- Beat Shazam - another music-related game show
- I Can See Your Voice - another music-related game show
