= Canta e Vinci =

Italian music quiz show

Canta e Vinci was an Italian music quiz show devised by Fatma Ruffini and directed by Duccio Forzano on R.T.I. (Reti Televisive Italiane), based on an adaptation of the international series Don't Forget the Lyrics! (an original Fox show).

The program was hosted by Amadeus (full name Amedeo Umberto Rita Sebastiani) and by Checco Zalone. The pilot episode was broadcast on 18 December 2007 with success, but the season suspended on 10 April 2008 because of poor showing, although some filmed episodes were shown during the summer of 2008.

The economics of the show was discussed by Long (2014) as important as its aesthetics.

The top prize of the Italian show was 250,000 euros. The competitor has three lifelines: asking for 2 missing words to be shown, the chance to call a friend or relative in the studio or ask one of three possible choices displayed. Massimo Martelli, Paolo Cuccia, Alfredo Morabito and Gennaro Nunziante took part in the various pilots and episodes.

The game show has come back on the air from 7 February 2022, on Nove presented by Gabriele Corsi, aired from Monday to Friday in access prime time with the title Don't Forget the Lyrics! - Stai sul pezzo.

== Prizes ==
Every contestent is called to sing famous nation and international songs on the karaoke, choosing one among the 10 categories first - plus the secret one which is worth €250,000 - then one of the two songs which belongs to that category. Afterwards, at a certain point in the song the music stops and the contestant needs to attempt to guess the rest of the melody, attempting to reach the highest step on the ladder, that of €250,000 (in the style of Who Wants to Be a Millionaire?). The contestent can ask for three lifelines:

- "The 2 words", revealing two words of their choise from the phrase to be guessed
- "The friend", the chance to consult a friend or relative from among the two present in the studio
- "3x1", the option to choose from three alternative answers

=== Ladder of prizes ===
Correct song lines	Prize
1	€1,000
2	€2,000
3	€3,000
4	€4,000
5	€5,000
6	€10,000
7	€20,000
8	€30,000
9	€50,000
10	€250,000 (Top prize)

No one has won the Top Prize of €250,000; however, eight contestants made into the Final Song. Six contestants decided to walk away with €50,000, two contestants failed the Final Song.

== Transmission ==
The quiz show's pilot episode was aired on Tuesday 18th December 2007, achieving a great success (12% audience shared), enough to lead to an eleven-episode series that began on Sunday, March 16, 2008, however the series was paused on the 10th April 2008 due to poor ratings: the remaining episodes were broadcast during the summer.

== Trivia ==
The Napoletan rapper Clementino - who was at that time unknown - appeared in one episode, winning a sum of €30,000. This experience is reccounted by the rapper in his song Amsterdam, from the album Mea culpa.
