= TVP2 =

Polish public television channel operated since 1970

- Logo used since March 2003
- Country: Poland
- Broadcast area: National
- Headquarters: Warsaw

Programming
- Picture format: 576i (16:9) (SDTV); 1080i (HDTV)

Ownership
- Owner: Telewizja Polska
- Sister channels: TVP1; TVP3; TVP HD

History
- Launched: 2 October 1970; 56 years ago
- Former names: TVP2 (1970–1976); TP2 (1976–1992)

Links
- Website: www.tvp.pl/tvp2

Availability

Terrestrial
- Polish digital: MUX 3 (Channel 2)(HD)

TVP2 (Note: Between 1976 and 1992, the official abbreviation was TP2.) (officially Program Drugi Telewizji Polskiej, "Programme Two of Telewizja Polska"), commonly known as Dwójka ("the second [channel"), is the second television channel of the Polish public broadcaster Telewizja Polska (TVP). It was launched on 2 October 1970. Its programming includes documentaries, historical programmes, talk shows and game shows, with an emphasis on entertainment programming such as stand-up comedy, comedy programmes, cabaret and themed talk shows, including programmes focusing on travel and foreign cultures.

TVP2 is broadcast as part of the nationwide, unencrypted (free-to-air) third multiplex of digital terrestrial television (MUX 3). It is also available on all cable networks and satellite digital platforms in accordance with the so-called must-carry rule—a provision in the Broadcasting and Television Act requiring every television operator to offer seven specific channels: TVP1, TVP2, and TVP3, as well as four commercial ones: TVN, Polsat, TV4, and TV Puls.

TVP2 is also available online free of charge through TVP VOD and TVP GO.

== History ==
=== Beginnings ===
The second channel of TVP has undergone many transformations over the years. Upon its launch on 2 October 1970, the chairman of the Radio and Television Committee, Włodzimierz Sokorski, declared in a ceremonial speech that the launch of the new program was an expression of "concern for the education and culture of the nation". At first, it was an educational channel that mainly aired scientific and educational programs, including foreign language lessons; therefore, it also broadcast foreign films in their original versions as part of series such as Kino wersji oryginalnej ("Cinema in the original version") or, somewhat later, Kino poliglotów ("the Polyglots' cinema"). The aim was also to promote the achievements of theater, film, and quality entertainment.

Dwójka also broadcast thematic programming blocks devoted to countries of the "people's democracies", such as Dzień Czechosłowacji w TP ("Czechoslovakia Day") and Dzień Jugosławii w TVP ("Yugoslavia Day"), which featured documentaries, feature films and entertainment programmes from those countries. Some Western countries were also featured, including France in Dzień francuski ("French Day") and Austria in Dzień austriacki ("Austrian Day"). During this period, rerun blocks such as Studio Bis and Spotkajmy się raz jeszcze ("Let's Meet Once Again") were also broadcast. In May 1971, the channel held Dni francuskie i japońskie ("French and Japanese Days").

On Christmas, Easter, New Year's Eve and New Year's Day, Dwójka prepared special film blocks such as Klasycy literatury na ekranie ("Classics of Literature on Screen"), Adaptacje filmowe literatury światowej ("Film Adaptations of World Literature"), Sylwestrowy cocktail ("New Year's Eve Cocktail") and Noworoczny relaks ("New Year's Relaxation"). It also broadcast programmes dedicated to individual artists, such as Dzień autorski... ("Author's Day..."). Throughout the 1970s, the channel did not yet have a distinct identity separate from Jedynka (Channel One). The same announcers presented both channels, while their graphics and programme styles remained largely similar.

=== The new face of the channel after martial law ===
After the final lifting of martial law in 1983 and the resumption of regular broadcasting, efforts were made to establish Dwójka as a channel with a distinct identity and a more diverse programming schedule. Initially, the channel focused mainly on documentary series about prominent artists, particularly writers, including Wielcy pisarze ("Great Writers"), as well as travel series and programmes devoted to major works of world cinema. These included auteur series featuring films by directors such as Woody Allen and Ingmar Bergman, as well as thematic series such as Kino Ameryki Łacińskiej ("Cinema of Latin America").

When Zbigniew Napierała became director of Dwójka, the channel increased its programming devoted to classical music, which at the time accounted for approximately 11% of its broadcasting schedule. Under the direction of Józef Węgrzyn, Dwójka adopted a new programming format that placed greater emphasis on entertainment and current affairs programmes, including Panorama dnia ("Daily Panorama"). A new announcer's studio was also introduced, along with a new team of hosts and presenters. During this period, Iwona Kubicz, Jolanta Fajkowska and Grażyna Torbicka made their debuts on Dwójka. The channel also expanded its programming and scheduled films at times that generally did not overlap with those broadcast on Jedynka (Channel One).

=== After 1989 ===
TP2 became TVP2 in 1992, at the time Poland was opening up to capitalism and began adapting international game show formats, such as Koło Fortuny and Familiada.

In recent years, Dwójka has broadcast a diverse range of programmes, with entertainment making up a significant part of its schedule alongside cultural programming. In spring 2016, during Maciej Chmiel's tenure as director, the channel introduced several new cultural and educational programmes, including Śniadanie na trawie ("Breakfast on the Grass"), Dzika muzyka ("Wild Music"), and Komediowa Scena Dwójki ("Comedy Stage of Channel Two"), a programme inspired by the tradition of literary cabaret.

On 7 March 2003, the channel introduced its current logo (the 2 introduced in 2000 was made upright and orange became the channel's signature color).

In March 2016, TVP2 aired the premiere episodes of Sonda 2 — a popular science program that continued the cult television series from the 1970s. The host of Sonda 2 was Dr. Tomasz Rożek. The program was moved to TVP1 in the autumn of 2017, where it was broadcast until 2018.

=== Timetable ===
- 2 October 1970, 6:55 p.m. – The broadcast of Telewizja Polska's Second Channel began. Dwójka launched with an inaugural speech by the chairman of the Radio and Television Committee, Włodzimierz Sokorski, who declared that Program II was being launched as an expression of "concern for the education and culture of the nation." Immediately after his speech, A Feature from the Future featuring Stanisław Lem was aired. Dwójka was intended as an educational channel, initially broadcasting five days a week with a predominance of educational and scientific programs, including foreign language lessons. It was also meant to popularize achievements in theater, film, and quality entertainment. At first, Dwójka was available only to viewers in Warsaw, Łódź, Katowice, and Kraków, broadcasting five days a week from 6:00 p.m. to 10:30 p.m.
- 18 March 1971 – After several years of experimental broadcasts, half-hour color programs began airing once a week (every Thursday).
- 22 July 1971 – The first color theatrical performance was broadcast: an adaptation of Anton Chekhov's On the Harmful Effects of Tobacco (O szkodliwości palenia tytoniu), directed by Jerzy Antczak.
- 6 December 1971 – Daily color transmissions began, featuring live coverage from the congress of the Polish United Workers' Party (PZPR).
- 1973 – Dwójka began airing Gallery of 33 Million (Galerii 33 milionów), a series on contemporary art created and hosted by Franciszek Kuduk. Each episode focused on a prominent Polish artist, such as Stefan Gierowski, Czesław Rzepiński, Edward Dwurnik, Zdzisław Beksiński, Władysław Hasior, and Mieczysław Wejman. The series was filmed in artists' studios, allowing for direct conversations and art presentations. The show earned high praise from both viewers and critics, greatly contributing to the popularization of visual arts in Poland. It continued for 20 years under various titles, later known as Gallery of 38 Million (Galeria 38 milionów).
- 4 February 1974 – Program Two began daily broadcasting.
- 30 November 1974 – The legendary entertainment show Studio 2, conceived by Mariusz Walter, premiered. It was a variety show featuring popular stars and quickly moved to TVP1. After the end of Edward Gierek's era and television's "golden age", Studio 2 returned to Dwójka as a more modest weekend program block.
- 13 December 1981 – Broadcasting of Dwójka was suspended due to the introduction of martial law.
- 8 February 1982 – Broadcasting resumed. Alongside the local program and Television News Journal (Dziennik Telewizyjny), Dwójka aired In the Old Cinema (W starym kinie).
- February 1982 – Deaf and hard-of-hearing audiences could now watch the main edition of Dziennik Telewizyjny with a sign language interpreter. The program aired on weekends until 1987, with over 500 editions produced for the hearing impaired.
- July 1 – 23 December 1983 – Another suspension of broadcasting; initially on all days, and later (from 1 October) only on weekends.
- 1985 – Premiere of the journalistic program Reporters' Express (Ekspresu reporterów), edited by Blanka Danilewicz.
- 15 October 1986 – First episode of the Crime Magazine 997 (Magazynu Kryminalnego 997), hosted by Michał Fajbusiewicz.
- 30 March 1987, 9:30 p.m.' – First edition of Dwójkas daily news program Panorama dnia.
- 9 August 1987 – Premiere of The Homeland of the Polish Language (Ojczyzny polszczyzny), hosted by Professor Jan Miodek (aired until 2007).
- 1988 – Premiere of Closer to the World (Bliżej świata), an 85-minute weekly news magazine presenting global highlights using satellite footage and commentary from foreign correspondents based in Poland (aired until 1991).
- 1988–1994 – Broadcast of the satirical program To Be Continued... ( by Wojciech Mann and Krzysztof Materna.
- 1988–1992 – Broadcast of the talk show 100 Questions for... (100 pytań do...) (later moved to TVP1 from 1992 to 1995).
- 30 December 1988 – Premiere of Poland's first soap opera, In the Labyrinth (W labiryncie), aired until 1990.
- 26 October 1989 – Premiere of Pearls from the Attic (Perły z lamusa), a program featuring classic films preceded by commentary from Zygmunt Kałużyński and Tomasz Raczek (aired until 1999).
- 2 September 1991 – First edition of Panorama.
- 20 April 1992 – Premiere of the talk show Desert Island (Bezludna wyspa) hosted by Nina Terentiew (aired until 2006).
- 2 October 1992 – Premiere of the game show Wheel of Fortune (Koło Fortuny) (aired 1992–1998, 2007–2009, and again since 2017).
- 1993 – Regular on-screen channel logo introduced.
- 14 November 1993 – Premiere of the talent show Chance for Success (Szansa na sukces) (aired until 2012 and revived in 2019).
- 1994–2016 – Broadcast of Grażyna Torbicka's film art program I Love Cinema (Kocham kino).
- 1 January 1994 – Dwójka switched from the SECAM to PAL color broadcasting system.
- 3 June 1994 – Premiere of the quiz show One Out of Ten (Jeden z dziesięciu), hosted by Tadeusz Sznuk (later moved to TVP1 from 2018 to 2024).
- 17 September 1994 – Premiere of the game show Family Feud (Familiada), hosted by Karol Strasburger.
- 11 March 1995 – Premiere of the satirical program KOC – The Comical Cyclic Episode (Komiczny Odcinek Cykliczny), by Grzegorz Wasowski and Sławomir Szczęśniak (aired until 2000).
- January 1997 – Together with TVP1, Dwójka began stereo sound broadcasting using the NICAM system.
- 15 June 1997 – Launch of a separate teletext service for TVP2 (previously, TVP1 and TVP2 shared the same teletext).
- 26 December 1997 – Premiere of the soap opera The Złotopolskis (Złotopolscy), aired until 2010.
- 12 September 1998 – Premiere of Robert Makłowicz's culinary show, which continued under various titles until 2017, the last being Makłowicz in Travel (Makłowicz w podróży)
- 6 October 1999 – First edition of Reporters' Express Magazine (Magazynu Ekspresu Reporterów) (moved to TVP1 in 2019).
- 7 November 1999 – Premiere of the medical soap opera For Better and for Worse (Na dobre i na złe).
- 23 January 2000 – Premiere of the sitcom Holy War (Święta wojna), aired until 2008.
- 20 April 2000 – Change of logo: the thick white "2" was replaced by a slimmer, slightly italicized design.
- 4 November 2000 – Premiere of the soap opera L for Love (M jak miłość).
- 2 September 2002 – First edition of the morning show Question for Breakfast (Pytanie na śniadanie).
- 7 March 2003 – Change of logo and graphic design, aligning with other Polish Television channels (the number "2" was accompanied by the new orange TVP logo).
- 12 October 2003 – Premiere of The Weekly of Moral Anxiety (Tygodnik Moralnego Niepokoju), aired until 2006.
- 15 December 2005 – Premiere of the crime drama Pitbull, aired until 2008.
- 2 September 2006 – Final episode of the game show The Great Game (Wielka gra).
- January 2007 – Studio Teatralne Dwójki, showcasing contemporary Polish drama, was removed from the schedule (briefly restored in 2014, then canceled again in 2017).
- 27 September 2007 – Premiere of the soap opera Colors of Happiness (Barwy szczęścia).
- 7 September 2008 – Premiere of the historical-war drama Days of Honor (Czas honoru), aired until 2013.
- 26 September 2009 – Premiere of TVP2 Cabaret Club (Kabaretowy Klub Dwójki), aired until 2012.
- 18 November 2009 – Test broadcasts in widescreen 16:9 format.
- 27 October 2010 – Regular digital broadcasts of TVP1 and TVP2 in SD quality on the third multiplex of terrestrial digital television.
- 30 December 2010, 4:00 p.m. – Dwójka aired its last regional programming from Telewizja Polska's regional centers.
- 14 February 2011 – Panorama began regular widescreen 16:9 broadcasting.
- 2 March 2011 – Premiere of the comedy series Rodzinka.pl, aired until 2020.
- 5 March 2011 – Premiere of the game show Bet on a Million (Postaw na milion), hosted by Łukasz Nowicki.
- 3 September 2011 – Premiere of the talent show The Voice of Poland.
- 14 December 2011 – Regular SD broadcasts of TVP1 and TVP2 began on the first multiplex of terrestrial digital television.
- 31 May 2012 – Launch of regular HD broadcasting under the name TVP2 HD.
- 1 March 2013 – Premiere of the live comedy show Thank God It's Weekend (Dzięki Bogu już weekend), aired intermittently until 2016.
- 12 February 2014 – Premiere of the medical series Na sygnale (broadcast on TVP1 from 2021–2022).
- 15 March 2014 – The SD version of TVP2 was replaced by Stopklatka TV on multiplex 1.
- 5 September 2014 – Premiere of the comedy-drama Don't Worry About Me (O mnie się nie martw), aired until 2021.
- 7 April 2017 – The SD version of TVP2 ceased broadcasting on the Hot Bird satellite (13° E).
- 3 September 2021 – 28 August 2023 – Change of logo and graphic design; however, the existing on-screen logo and website branding remained.
- 14 February 2022 – TVP2 became available for free through the TVP GO app on iOS and Android.
- July 25 – 18 November 2022 – Dwójka was available on TVP's test multiplex in the DVB-T2/HEVC standard.
- 1 June 2023 – TVP2 became available for free on the TVP VOD website and app.
- 20 December 2023 – 10 January 2024 – Suspension of Panorama broadcasts due to changes in TVP leadership made by Minister of Culture and National Heritage Bartłomiej Sienkiewicz.
- 1 September 2024 – Final broadcast of Panorama on TVP2.

== TVP2 HD ==
Logo of TVP2 HD

On 31 May 2012, digital terrestrial broadcasting of the TVP2 channel in HD standard under the name TVP2 HD began. However, the official launch date was 1 June 2012 with the coverage of the UEFA Euro 2012., when regular satellite broadcasting and cable television transmission also started. The program schedules of TVP2 and TVP2 HD are identical.

SD broadcasting via satellite (Eutelsat Hot Bird) stopped on 7 April 2017.

== Current line-up ==
=== Morning show ===
- Pytanie na śniadanie (A question for breakfast) (in 7:30-11:15 CET)

=== Polish series ===
Series	Type	First aired	No. of series	No. of episodes
M jak miłość (L for Love)	Soap opera	Autumn 2000	27	2000
Barwy szczęścia (Colors of Happiness)	Soap opera	Autumn 2007	20	3500
Na dobre i na złe (For Better and for Worse)	Soap opera, medical series	Autumn 1999	28	1030
Rodzinka.pl (Family.pl)	Comedy series	Spring 2011	19	326
Na sygnale (With the Siren)	Medical series, scripted reality	Spring 2014	14	1000
SOR (Emergency department)	Medical series	Autumn 2026	1	12

=== Foreign series ===
- House M.D. - in Polish "Dr House"
- Modern Family - in Polish "Współczesna rodzina"
- CSI: Crime Scene Investigation - in Polish "CSI: Kryminalne Zagadki Las Vegas"
- Kurt Seyit ve Şura - in Polish "Imperium miłości"
- Scandal - in Polish "Skandal"
- Grimm
- Lie to Me - in Polish "Magia kłamstwa"
- Dirt - in Polish "Intrygi i kłamstwa"
- Life - in Polish "Powrót do Życia"
- In Plain Sight - in Polish "Na linii strzału"
- Castle
- Ugly Betty - in Polish "Brzydula Betty"
- My Name Is Earl - in Polish "Na imię mi Earl"
- Battlestar Galactica
- The Closer - in Polish "Podkomisarz Brenda Johnson"
- The Knights of Prosperity - in Polish "Obrobić VIP-a"
- Twin Peaks - in Polish "Miasteczko Twin Peaks"
- M.A.S.H.
- Yasak Elma
- Bionic Woman - in Polish "Bionic Woman: Agentka Przyszłości"
- Junior Eurovision Song Contest - in Polish "Konkurs Piosenki Eurowizji Junior"
- Benim Hala Umudum Var - in Polish "Nadzieja i miłość"
- Peaky Blinders
- Deadwind - in Polish "W cieniu śmierci"
- Harry Wild

=== Entertainment ===
- The Voice of Poland
- The Voice Kids
- The Voice Senior
- Pink Lady and Jeff (1982-1986, Polish dub, as "Pink Lady i Jeff")
- Kocham Cię, Polsko! (I Love My Country)
- Familiada (Family Feud)
- Koło Fortuny (Wheel of Fortune)
- Postaw na milion (The Million Pound Drop Live)
- Va banque (Jeopardy!)
- Jeden z dziesięciu (Fifteen to One)
- Tak to leciało! (Don't Forget the Lyrics!)
- Europa da się lubić – nowe pokolenie (Europe's easy to like – Next Generation)
- Gabi Drzewiecka zaprasza
- Omnibus – szybcy i mądrzy

=== Sports ===
- UEFA Europa League (Final and Polish teams)
- 2030 FIFA World Cup
- UEFA Euro 2028
- IAAF World Championships in Athletics
- European Athletics Championships

=== Documentary series/Lifestyle programs ===
- Sonda 2 - popular science series, hosted by Tomasz Rożek
- Wojciech Cejrowski - boso przez świat (Wojciech Cejrowski - Barefoot Around the World) - travel series
- Makłowicz w podróźy (Makłowicz traveling) - travel and culinary series
- Podróże z historią - history documentary series, hosted by Radosław Kotarski

=== Culture ===
- Kultura, głupcze (Culture, stupid) - cultural talk show hosted by Kamil Dąbrowa
- Kocham Kino (I love movies) - movie magazine hosted by Grażyna Torbicka
- WOK - Wszystko o Kulturze (Everything about the culture)
- Rozmowy po-szczególne

== Primetime schedule ==
All times are CET.

PM	8:00	8:15	8:30	8:45	9:00	9:15	9:30	9:45	10:00	10:15	10:30	10:45	11:00	11:15
Monday	Barwy szczęścia			Behind the scenes of TVP2 series	M jak miłość				Na sygnale		TV series			
Tuesday	Barwy szczęścia			Behind the scenes of TVP2 series	M jak miłość				Na sygnale		SOR			
Wednesday	Barwy szczęścia			Behind the scenes of TVP2 series	Na dobre i na złe				Na sygnale		Magazyn Ekspresu Reporterów			
Thursday	Barwy szczęścia			Postaw na milion				Super Gary. Gotuj z Bosacką		Niepewne sytuacje		Europa da się lubić – Nowe pokolenie (R)		
Friday	Barwy szczęścia			Kocham Cię, Polsko!							Gabi Drzewiecka zaprasza			
Saturday	Rodzinka.pl		The Voice of Poland											
Sunday	Kocham Cię, Polsko! (R)			movie								Kwiatki Polskie duże		

== Early fringe schedule ==
All times are CET.

PM	5:00	5:15	5:30	5:45	6:00	6:15	6:30	6:45	7:00	7:15	7:30	7:45
Monday	Familiada	Gelin				Jeopardy!		Jeden z dziesięciu			Barwy szczęścia (R)	
Tuesday	Familiada	Gelin				Jeopardy!		Jeden z dziesięciu			Barwy szczęścia (R)	
Wednesday	Familiada	Gelin				Jeopardy!		Jeden z dziesięciu			Barwy szczęścia (R)	
Thursday	Familiada	Gelin				Jeopardy!		Jeden z dziesięciu			Barwy szczęścia (R)	
Friday	Familiada	Gelin				Jeopardy!		Jeden z dziesięciu			Barwy szczęścia (R)	
Saturday	Na dobre i na złe (R)	Gelin				Omnibus – szybcy i mądrzy				Słowo na niedzielę	Rodzinka.pl (R)	
Sunday	Europa da się lubić – nowe pokolenie	Tak to leciało!				Omnibus – szybcy i mądrzy				Kocham Cię, Polsko! (R)		

NOTE: As of February 2024, Jeopardy! airs at 6:10 and not 6:20 PM. Panorama is moved for that reason.

== Previously on TVP2 ==
=== News shows ===
- Panorama

=== Polish series ===
- Złotopolscy (The Złotopolskis)
- Egzamin z życia (Life Exam)
- Kopciuszek (Cinderella)
- Licencja na wychowanie (License for education)
- Apetyt na życie (Appetite for life)
- U Pana Boga w ogródku (In the garden of God)
- Ja to mam szczęście (I am lucky enough to)
- Głęboka woda (Deep water) - drama series (spring 2011, 2 seasons)
- Czas honoru (Time of honor) - war drama series (autumn 2008–2014, 6 seasons)

=== Foreign series ===
- Seks w wielkim mieście - Sex and the City
- Z Archiwum X - The X-Files
- Rzym - Rome
- Mała Brytania - Little Britain
- Dr Quinn - Dr. Quinn, Medicine Woman
- Kochanie, zmniejszyłem dzieciaki - Honey, I Shrunk the Kids: The TV Show
- Nie ma to jak Hotel - The Suite Life of Zack & Cody
- Powrót na October Road - October Road

=== Comedy series ===
- Aida
- Wiadomości z drugiej ręki (News on the other hand)
- Codzienna 2 m. 3 (Everyday Lane 2/3)
- Lokatorzy (Lodgers)
- Święta wojna (Holy War)
- O mnie się nie martw (Don't Worry About Me)
- Pan mama (Mr. Mum)

=== Entertainment ===
- Duże dzieci (a programme in which young children discuss various topics: from politics to cuisine)
- Europa da się lubić (Europe's easy to like)
- Fabryka śmiechu (Laughter factory)
- Mój pierwszy raz (My first time)
- Od przedszkola do Opola (a programme in which young children sing with professionals)
- Oto jest pytanie
- Gilotyna (Cresus)
- Podróże z żartem (Travel with laughter) - a travel talk show
- 30 ton - lista, lista, lista przebojów - top 30 chart show
- Bezludna wyspa (talk show)
- Dubidu (music show)
- Spotkanie z balladą
- Tele PRLe
- Tygodnik Moralnego Niepokoju (TV show of Polish cabaret Kabaret Moralnego Niepokoju)
- Fort Boyard
- Szansa na sukces (Chance for success)
- Wideoteka dorosłego człowieka (Human Adult Video Library) - programme about music from 1950s, 1960s, 1970s and 1980s
- Bitwa na głosy (Clash of the Choirs)
- Kabaretowy Klub Dwójki (Twos Comedy Club) - performances of the best Polish cabarets
- Kocham to, co lubię (I love what I like) - satirical and cultural talk show hosted by Wojciech Mann
- Dzięki Bogu już weekend (Thank God It's Weekend) - Polish cabarets
- SuperSTARcie (Polish version of Ultimate Entertainer)
- Latający Klub Dwójki (The Two's Flying Club) - Polish cabarets
- Paranienormalni Tonight - comedy talk show
- Wielka Gra (The $64,000 Question)
- Bake Off - Ale ciacho!
- Kochanie, ratujmy nasze dzieci
- Pierwsza randka (First Dates)
- Cudowne lata

=== Documentary/talk shows ===
- Tomasz Lis na żywo (2008-2016)
- Kochaj mnie
- Warto rozmawiać - controversial talk show, accused of right-wing spinning (since March 2016 on TVP1)
- Magazyn Kryminalny 997

=== Children's shows ===
- Ulica Sezamkowa (Polish Sesame Street)

=== Anime ===
- Peter Pan: The Animated Series (as Piotruś Pan)
- Princess Sara (as Mała Księżniczka)

== Logos and identities ==
The first four identifiers were not used continuously during broadcasts. They appeared only during breaks, idents, and daily program summaries. It was only toward the end of 1991 that the station began test broadcasting with an on-screen logo (the fifth one at the time). During these tests, the size and position of the logo on the screen were adjusted. Regular broadcasts with a permanent on-screen logo (the sixth one) in the upper right corner began in mid-1993 (probably in June).

Additionally, the logo sometimes appeared in the upper left corner of the screen, such as during the quiz show Wielka gra, when a timer counting down the player's response time was shown on the right side, or during sports broadcasts (where the match score appeared on the right). Initially, the logo was also not displayed during news programs.

Period of use	Description	Image
2 October 1970 – around 1975	Black inscription "TVP" and a large hatched number "2" on a white background.	
Around 1975–1976	On a beige background, a red inscription "TELEWIZJA POLSKA" at the top; at the bottom, a large red number "2" with a red diagonal inscription "PROGRAM" to its left.	
Around 1976–1985	The distinctive "TP" (Telewizja Polska) logo – the letters "T" and "P" joined naturally in white and red on a black background, with white inscriptions ("Telewizja Polska" on top; "Program 2" below). Designed by Roman Duszek.	
Around 1982–1985	On a black background, orange lines with a slanted number "2" in the center and the word "PROGRAM" to the right. During events, the word "PROGRAM" was replaced by the title of the ongoing event (e.g., Sylwester w Dwójce).	
Around 1985–1992	A stylized number "2" composed of three segments.	
1 March 1992 – 19 April 2000	A "thick" number "2." Initially, the on-screen logo was semi-transparent; later, it became white. Its size and position were also adjusted over time.	
20 April 2000 – 6 March 2003	A thinner, italicized number "2." It appeared on-screen during broadcasts until 6 March 2003, but this version continued to appear in idents, ad jingles, pauses, and daily program lists until May 2007.	
From 7 March 2003	The "TVP" logo with an upright number "2" on an orange background. It also appeared in a reversed color version and was most often seen in daily program guides for the press, in media partnership notices, and in the graphic design since 28 August 2023. From 3 September 2021, until about 5:00 a.m. on 28 August 2023, the logo was absent from the on-air graphics package but continued to serve as the on-screen logo and was used on websites.	
3 September 2021 – 28 August 2023 (idents only)	The station's logo was simplified to a white "TVP2" inscription on an orange background. However, the introduction of this new logo did not involve changing the logo displayed in the upper right corner during broadcasts or online identification; it only appeared in the graphic design of self-promotional materials, idents, and advertising formats.	

=== Commemorative on-screen logos ===
Occasion	Description	Image
During national mourning	The logo changes its color to black.	
During "Sylwester Marzeń" (New Year's Eve of Dreams)	The number "2" in the station's logo becomes colorful, adopting the color scheme consistent with the event's graphic design.	

=== TVP2 HD ===
Years	Description	Image
From 1 June 2012	The orange rectangular field was extended horizontally to the right. To the right of the number "2", within an orange gradient field, two white rectangles appeared with orange letters "HD" in superscript.	

== See also ==
- Television in Poland
- Television in Poland#Terrestrial
- Eastern Bloc information dissemination
