= Koło fortuny =

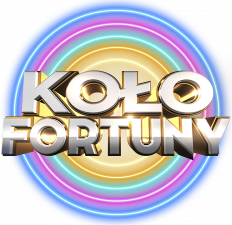
- Logo from 2017
- Genre: Game show
- Based on: Wheel of Fortune by Merv Griffin
- Presented by: First run: Wojciech Pijanowski; Magda Masny (Note: In 1997 Anna Samusionek stood in for Magda Masny for two months due to Masny’s pregnancy.) (hostess); Jerzy Bończak; Andrzej Kopiczyński; Paweł Wawrzecki; Stanisław Mikulski; Second run: Krzysztof Tyniec; Marta Piekarska (Note: Maiden name: Lewandowska. Often referred to as ‘Magda’.) (hostess); Third run: Rafał Brzozowski; Izabella Krzan (originally hostess, then co-host); Norbert "Norbi" Dudziuk; Błażej Stencel; Agnieszka Dziekan
- Country of origin: Poland
- Original language: Polish
- No. of episodes: ca. 2700

Production
- Production companies: Califon Productions; Paramount International Networks; Uni Vision (1992–1998); Telewizja Polska (2007–2009, 2017–present); ATM Grupa (2017–2020)

Original release
- Network: TVP2
- Release: 2 October 1992 – 1 September 1998
- Release: 29 October 2007 – 13 October 2009
- Release: 10 September 2017 – present

Koło fortuny is a Polish television game show based on the American program Wheel of Fortune and developed for Poland by Wojciech Pijanowski and Paweł Hańczakowski. The show first ran from 2 October 1992 to 1 September 1998, its second run went from 29 October 2007 to 13 October 2009, and its third run was debuted on 10 September 2017.

For rules of the game, see the article entitled Wheel of Fortune (American game show), as this article only describes the unique differences in the Polish version of the show.

== Contestant podium color designations ==
The 2007–09 run of the show was one of few versions to use a green podium instead of the traditional blue, using a red-yellow-green sequence. The original show used the reverse order of the American version's color sequence, with blue on the left, yellow in the middle, and red on the right (also using the traditional diamond backdrops as seen in the American version from 1989 to 1992).

The current show's sequence is purple-blue-yellow.

== Differences (1990s version) ==
Koło fortuny was originally a TVP2 show which debuted on 2 October 1992, originally hosted by Wojciech Pijanowski and Magda Masny. Pijanowski left the show in 1995 and was replaced by Paweł Wawrzecki, who was himself quickly replaced by Stanisław Mikulski until the show's end on 1 September 1998.

The show debuted during Poland's period of Złoty hyperinflation, resulting in the top amounts being zł5,000,000/zł12,500,000/zł17,500,000/zł25,000,000 until 1995, when the "new" Złoty was introduced and all the values were numerically divided by 10,000, with the top amounts becoming zł500/zł1,250/zł1,750/zł2,500 (the change happened on January 1, 1995 - either before or during Wawrzecki's tenure). The use of a four-round structure was unusual, as this version also used the shopping format until sometime in 1994.

Numerically, Poland's top values from 1992 to 1995 were 5,000 times as high as the American top dollar values at the time. From 1995 to 1996, they were half as much as their American counterparts.

The contestant podiums were reversed in color to blue, yellow, and red from left to right. Behind the players were diamond backdrops similar to those of the American version, which were used until 1997 most recent.

From 1992 to 1996, the Wheel had 21 wedges with three pegs each; this was decreased to 20 wedges with two pegs each when the top amounts were changed to zł500/zł1,400/zł2,000 in 1996, when the Wheel also adopted a patterned color scheme. Bankrupt and Lose A Turn were called "Bankrut" and "Stop" respectively, although the latter was "Strata Kolejki" until sometime in 1993.

During a celebrity special for Christmas 1992, the Round 4 Wheel layout was used during the entire game, with no penalty wedges. By Round 2, Niespodzianka (Surprise) was placed on the pink zł500,000, Zestaw (a set of prizes) on Lose A Turn, and a blue zł17,500,000 on Bankrupt.

Gameplay-wise, there were several large differences from the American version:

- Only one arrow was used, located in front of the yellow player's podium.
- Vowels cost zł500,000 until the "new" Złoty debuted. In order for a contestant to buy a vowel, s/he needed to choose a consonant that was in the puzzle first. By 1997, vowels were treated the same way as consonants but did not multiply the spun amount (similar to the versions in Brazil and Vietnam).
- During the shopping era, the scores of players who failed to solve a puzzle were not affected. From at least 1995 to 1998, however, whenever a contestant solved a puzzle, their opponents were penalized half of their winnings. Players landing on Bankrupt were penalized their entire score, regardless of whether s/he had solved a puzzle.

=== Bonus Round ===
The Bonus Round was played for a car through 1996 and a prize worth up to zł10,000 from 1997 to 1998, but the seven envelopes (spelling out F-O-R-T-U-N-A on a pedestal much like the American one used from about 1990/91-92) only determined which five consonants and one vowel the player would receive initially, after which s/he then called for another three-and-a-vowel; if the contestant tried to give a letter already given in the chosen envelope, it was considered a wasted pick and held against the player. The time limit was 15 seconds, which started immediately after any picks were revealed; unlike most other known adaptations of the Bonus Round (apart from various American home console and computer game adaptations and possibly Denmark's version), the player had just one guess at the puzzle solution. If time ran out, or the contestant gave an incorrect answer, he/she did not win the bonus prize. A player who won the car only forfeited any purchased prizes and 90% of all cash winnings but kept any prizes won by landing on prize wedges.

By 1993, the seven envelopes were reduced to four (now spelling K-O-Ł-O with a star between each) and gave just three-and-a-vowel. For a brief time, the graphics were altered to show the chosen envelope's letters and the contestant's picks simultaneously along with the 15-second clock, although this was dropped by Spring 1994.

Sometime between Winter 1995 and Spring 1997, the time limit was reduced to 10 seconds; the envelope podium was shrunk to a short, domed style; and each envelope added 0, 1, 2, or 3 letters to the initial three-and-a-vowel.

=== Sound Effects ===
- Letter in puzzle: an F-sharp pitch on a synthesizer for each letter.
- Letter not in puzzle: a downward glissando on a synthesizer
- Puzzle solved: an upward glissando, followed by the music cue
- Bankrupt: a vibra slap.
- Category: a three-note cue in E-flat major.
- Time expires: a repeating high F-natural pitch.

== Differences (2007-09 version) ==
There was only one Toss-Up puzzle and three rounds before the Bonus Round in the 2007 version.

=== Toss-Up ===
The toss-up was worth a dishwasher or a trip to a hotel in Poland. Whoever buzzed in and solved the puzzle first won the dishwasher or trip and began Round 1. If the first player was wrong, the next player in line got a shot at the puzzle. The puzzle board's border lighted up red, yellow, or green to show who had buzzed in.

=== Vowels ===
Vowels are worth zł200, and needed to be purchased prior to spinning the wheel.

=== Prizes ===
In Rounds 1 and 3, a purple wedge that had the letters AGD was placed on the wheel. In all three Rounds, two green or silver wedges that had Wycieczka were also placed on the wheel. Round 2 featured prizes that changed from show to show, labeled with the word Nagroda.

A player who landed on a wedge, called a correct letter, and immediately solved the puzzle (à la the Jackpot Round in the United States) won the prize; otherwise, they needed to spin the wheel again or buy a vowel.

AGD represented home appliances worth zł5000, and Wycieczka represented a bonus trip to places such as Italy, Canary Islands, etc. Nagroda represents any other prize, ranging from multimedia to scooters. Other prize spaces include Sklep Internetowy, which represented specific prizes related to the internet and computers, and Skuter, which specifically represented scooters.

=== Penalty Spaces in Polish ===
Bankrut: Bankrupt

Stop: Lose a Turn.

=== The Third-Size 10,000 Wedge ===
In Round 2, a one-third size zł10,000 wedge surrounded by a Bankrupt on each side is featured (Bankrut/10,000/Bankrut). Unlike the American version of Wheel of Fortune, and like the Filipino version and other European versions, landing on the zł10,000 section earns spendable cash as normal. Since it is worth zł10,000, a Bankrupt is placed on each side, making it harder to hit. It is unknown whether the money was awarded in multiples or was given at a flat rate but more than likely the latter occurred.

=== Mystery Wedges ===
Round 3 was the Mystery round. The one Mystery wedge with cash hid zł10,000 (the other was Bankrupt). When a player landed on a Mystery wedge, the player has a choice of choosing a letter for zł500 or flipping over the wedge, which unlike the American version, must be made before a letter was called. If it was a Bankrupt, regular rules to Bankrupt applied. If it was the zł10,000, the player had to choose a correct letter in order to receive the cash prize. If (s)he did, (s)he received zł10,000 regardless of how many times the letter appeared in the puzzle, but the money could still be used to purchase vowels. In another difference with its American counterpart, both mystery wedges, including the unflipped one, are removed from the wheel (although the host would flip over both when removing them) once one is played. (In the American version, once played, the other mystery wedge is not removed and becomes a standard wedge played for face value on the wedge.)

=== Bonus Round ===
All versions since 2007 (2007–09, 2017–present) use the standard American rules in place since 2001.

The contestant spun a bonus wheel filled with cars, trips, and cash prizes ranging up to zł50,000. Also, the standard American rules of the era were used, meaning five free consonants - R, S, T, L, N, and one free vowel - E, then the player selects three more consonants and one vowel. The player has ten seconds to solve the puzzle, and unlike previous local versions, can make unlimited number of guesses for the duration of the round.

=== Sound Effects ===
- Letter in puzzle: no sound for the initial reveal, but when the hostess touched the letters, a high E-flat pitch played for each letter (the same sound carried over from the French version of the show).
- Letter not in puzzle/Bankrupt (Bankrut): a downward "boop;" both cases shared the same sound.
- Category: a musical cue.

== The Wheel ==
The layouts from late 1992 into early 1993, with the currency used during Poland's period of hyperinflation. "Lose A Turn" was known as "Strata Kolejki" at this time. The Nagroda (Prize) wedge was added in Round 2.

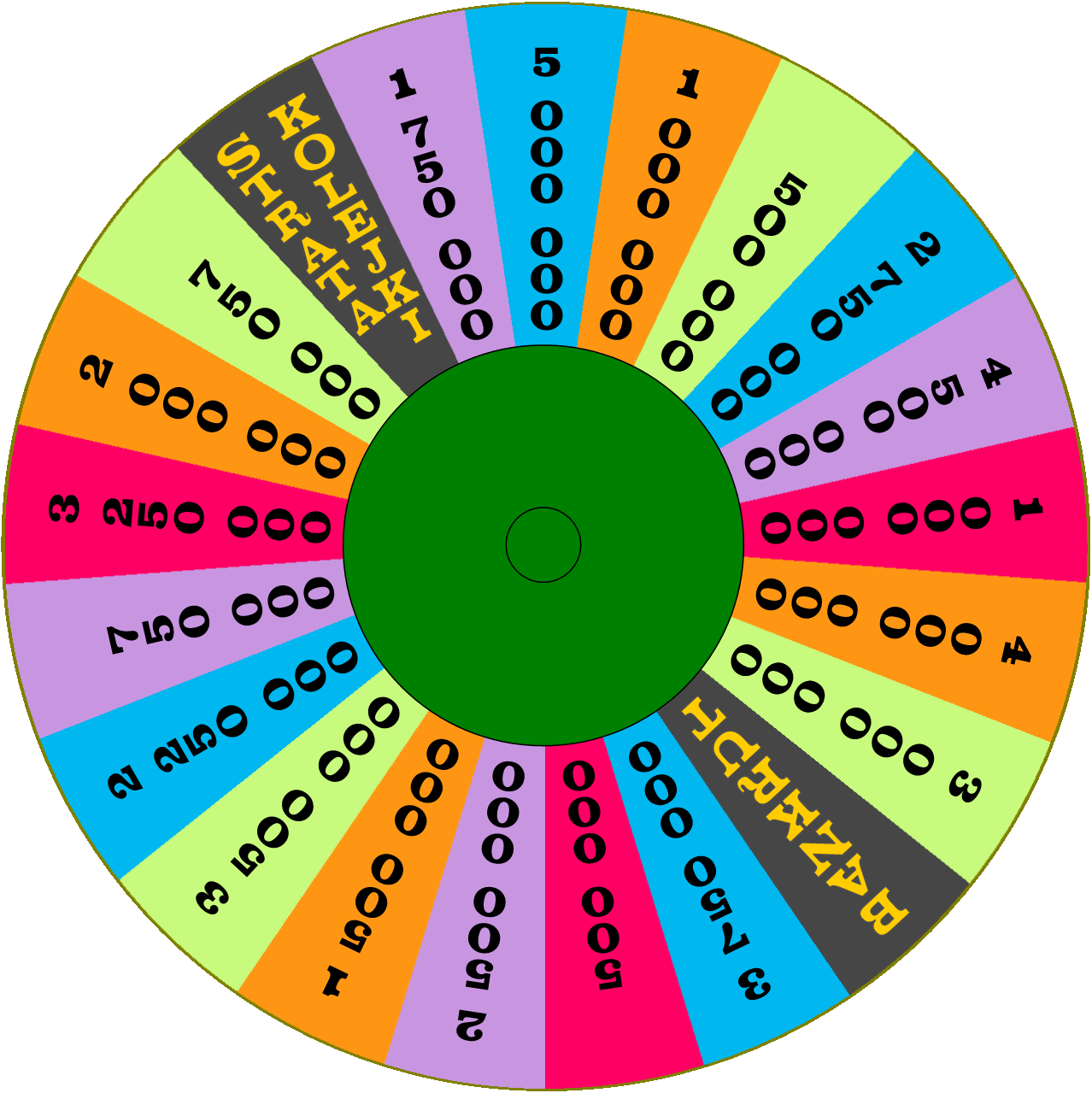
The round 1 layout with zł5,000,000 as top value.

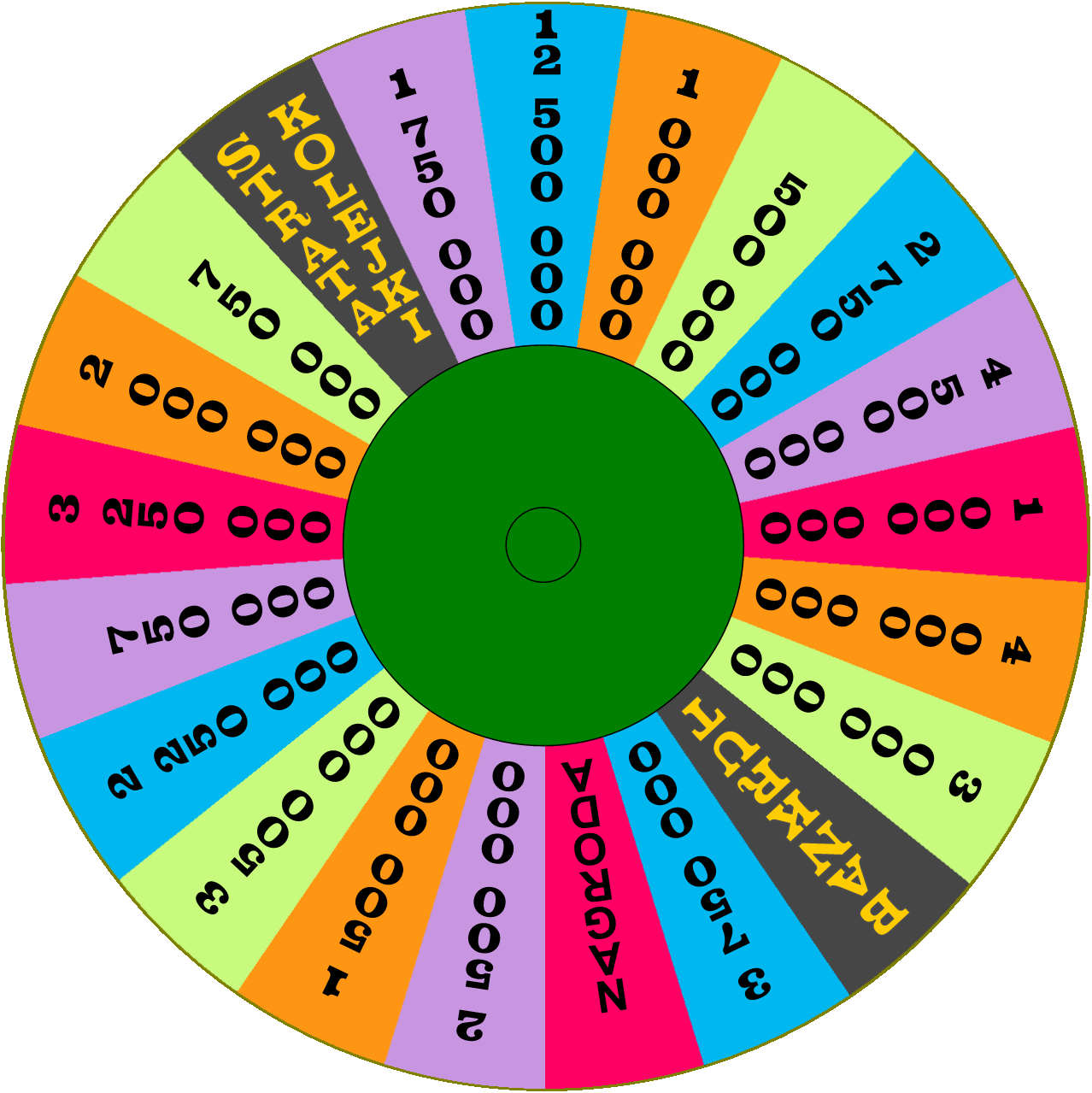
The round 2 layout with zł12,500,000 as top value.

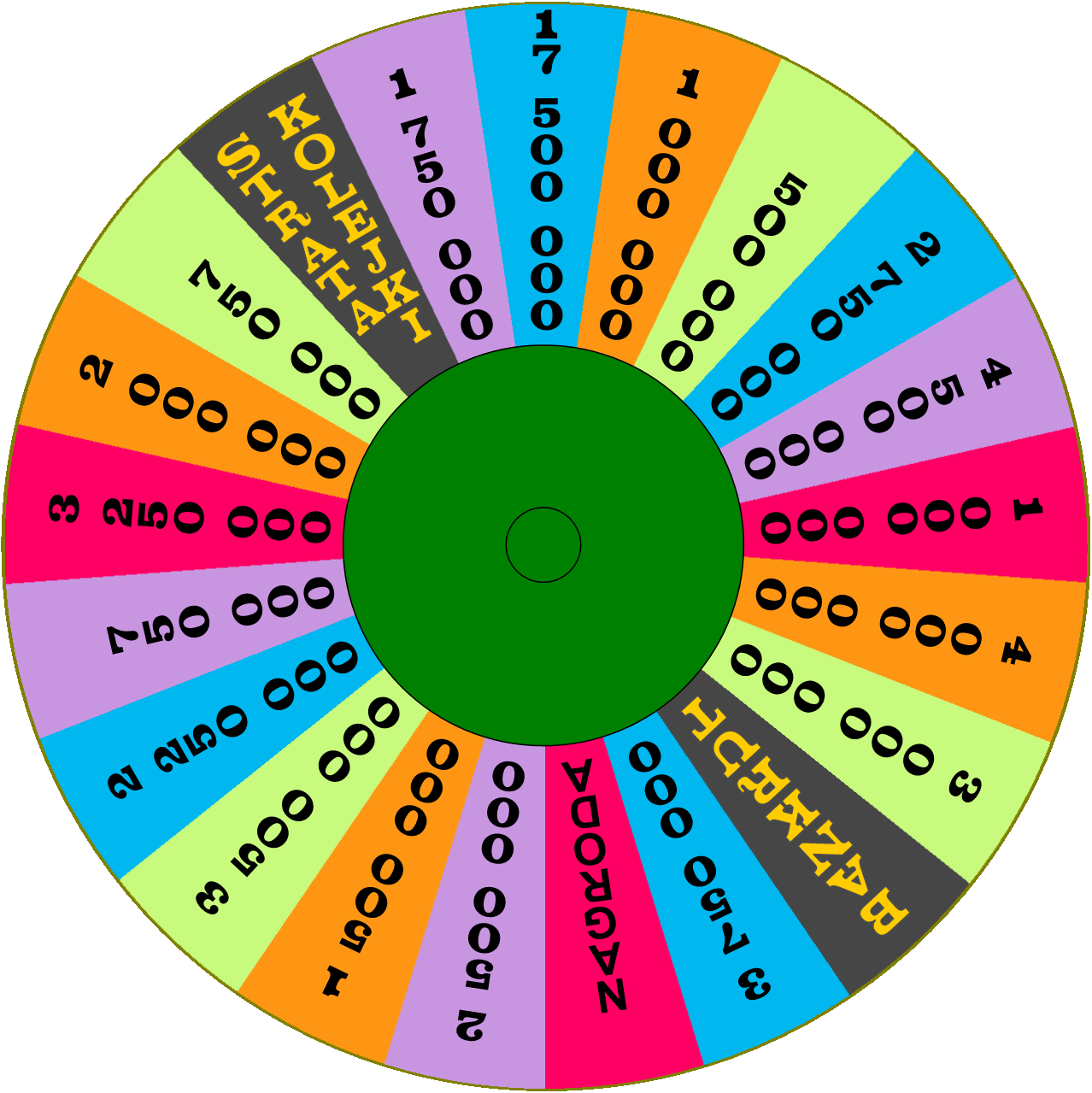
The round 3 layout with zł17,500,000 as top value.

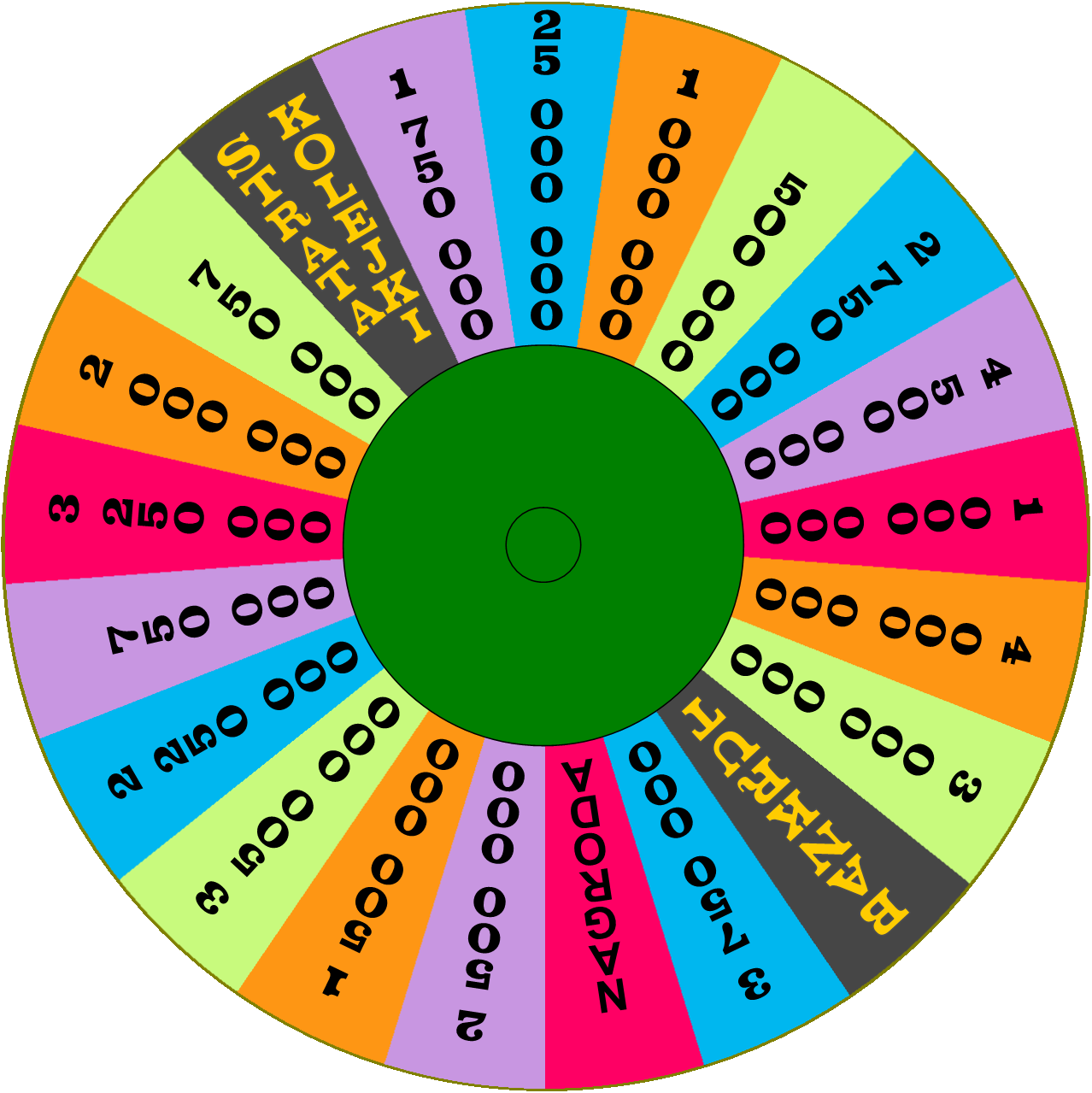
The round 4 layout with zł25,000,000 as top value.

The layouts from 1993 to about 1995, with a changed color scheme. "Lose a Turn" became "STOP."

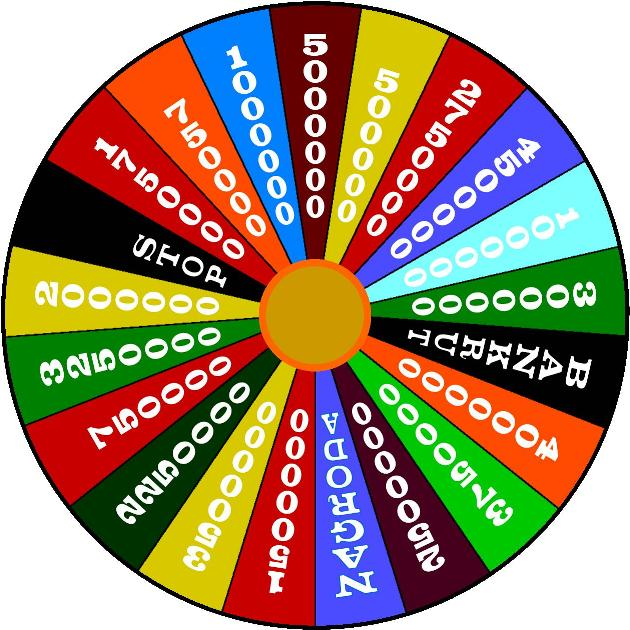
The round 1 layout with zł5,000,000 as top value.

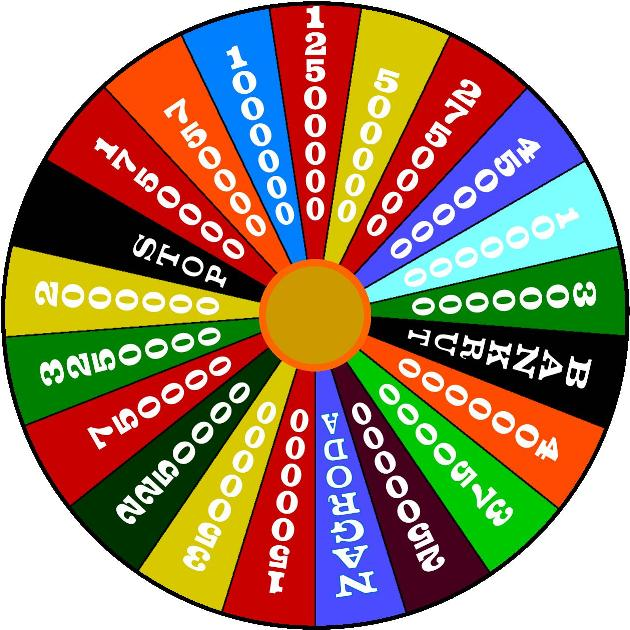
The round 2 layout with zł12,500,000 as top value.

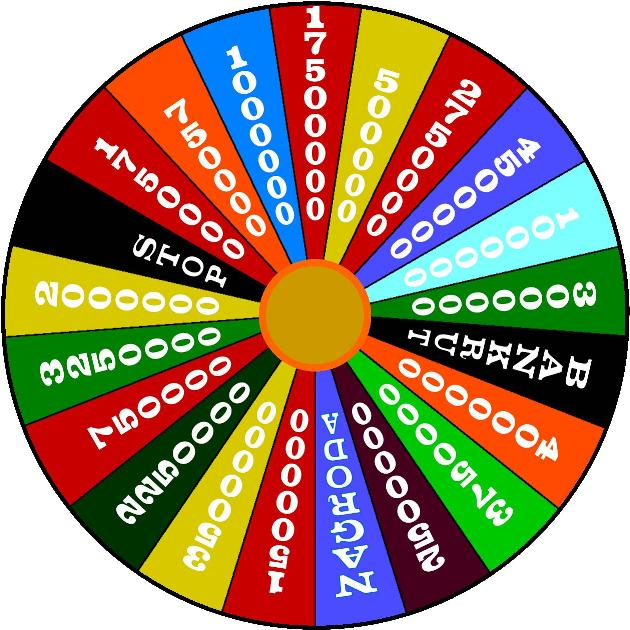
The round 3 layout with zł17,500,000 as top value.

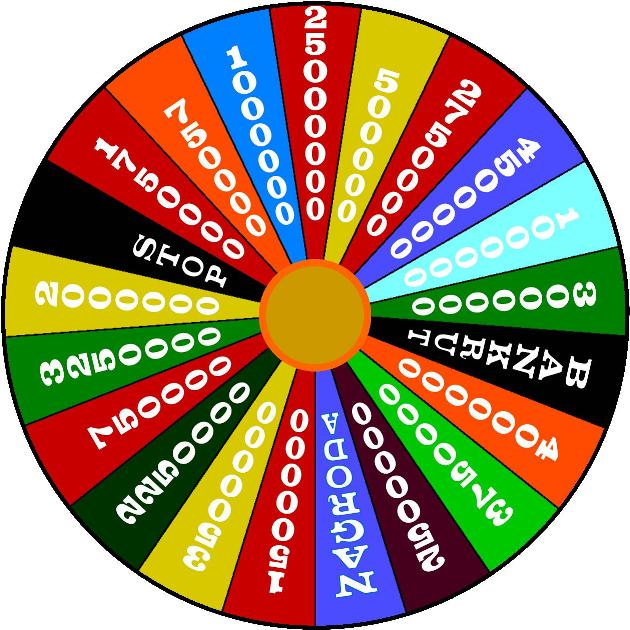
The round 4 layout with zł25,000,000 as top value.

The layouts used in 1995, when Poland introduced their new złoty.

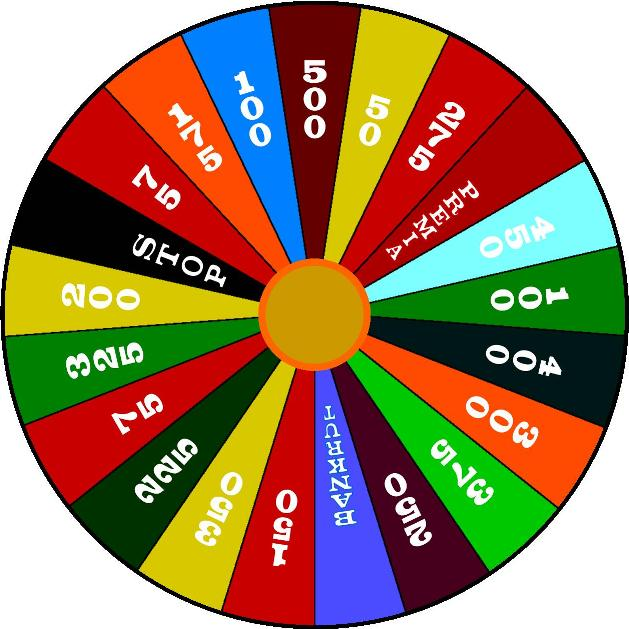
The round 1 layout with zł500 as top value. Premia awarded a green card to redeem for a free spin.

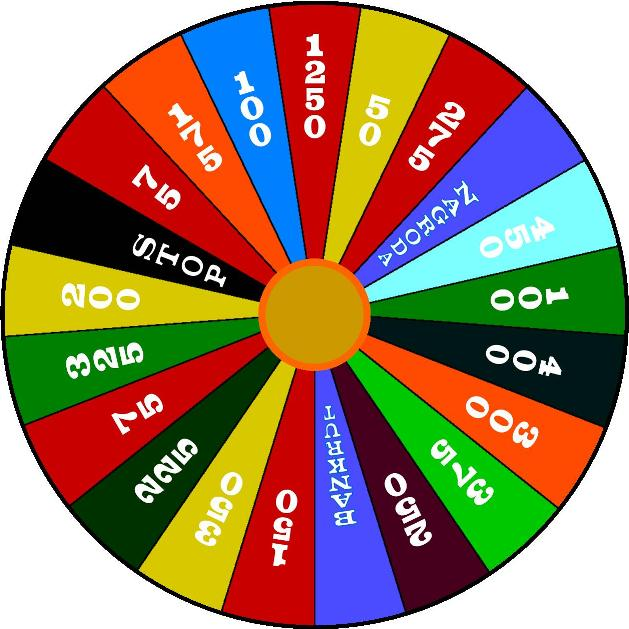
The round 2 layout with zł1250 as top value.

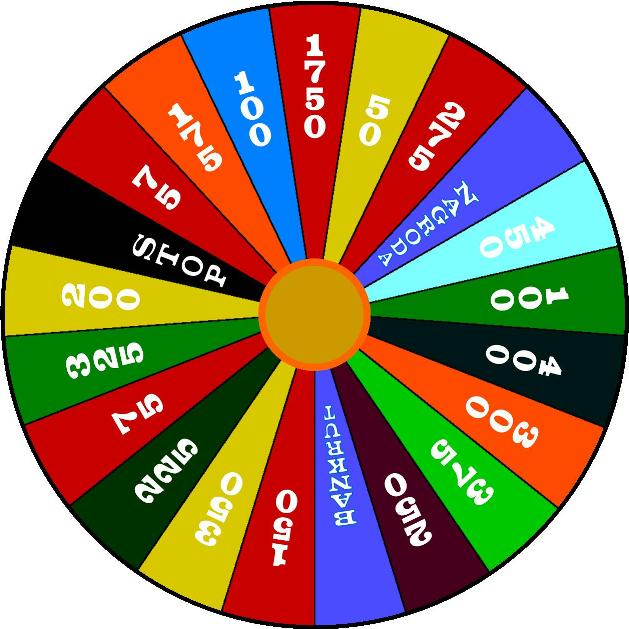
The round 3 layout with zł1750 as top value.

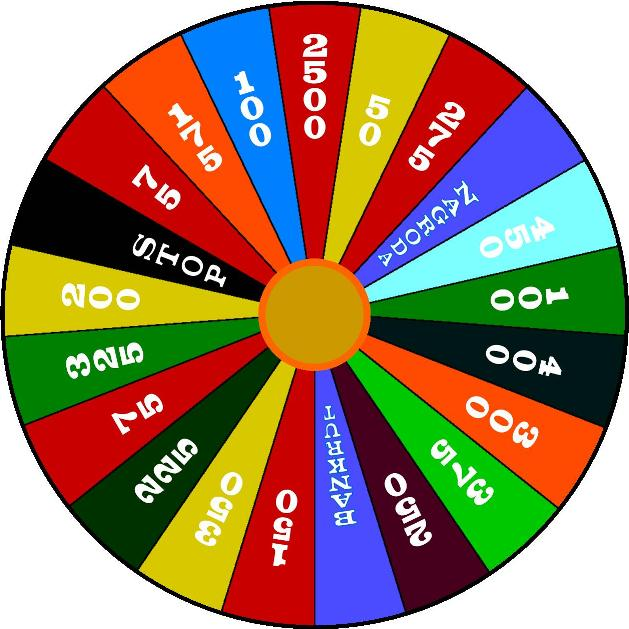
The round 4 layout with zł2500 as top value.

The layouts used from 1996 to about 1998, when Poland's 21 wedges were reduced to 20. Note the color pattern.

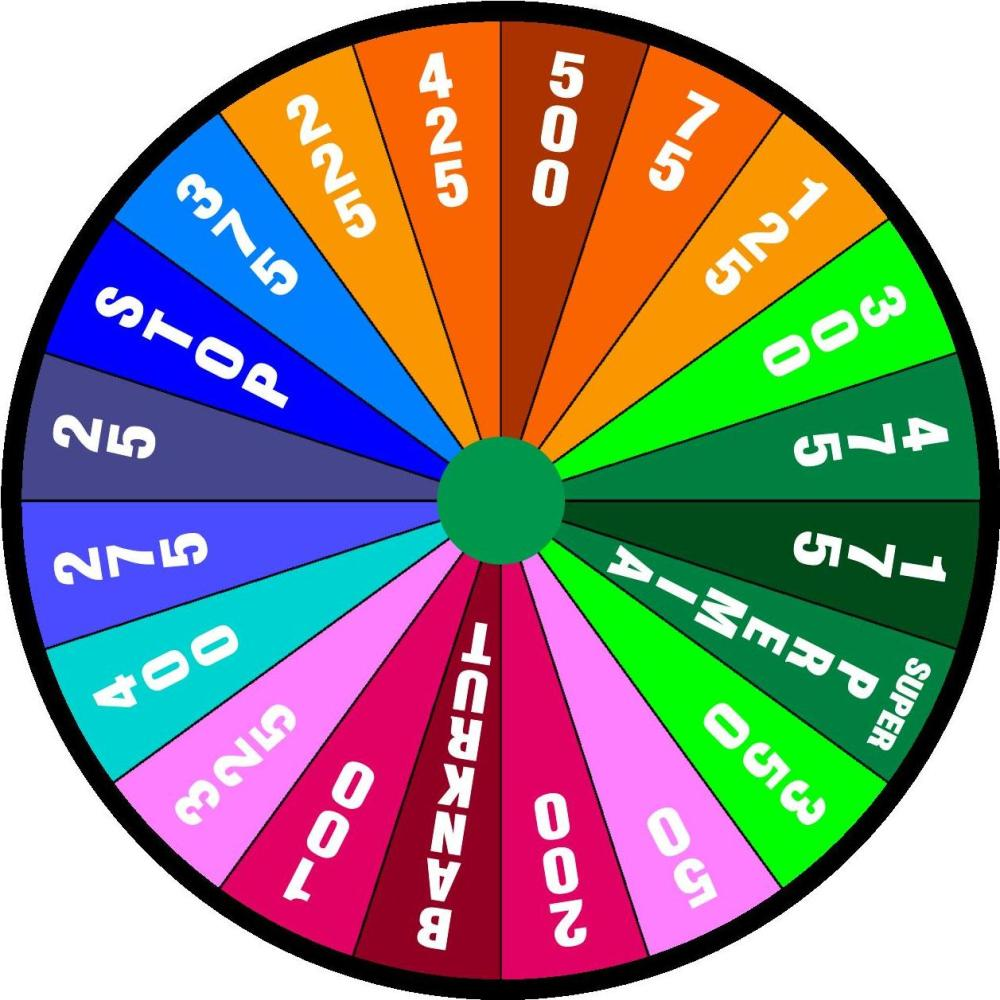
The round 1 layout with zł500 as top value. Super Premia allowed a player to choose three consonants.

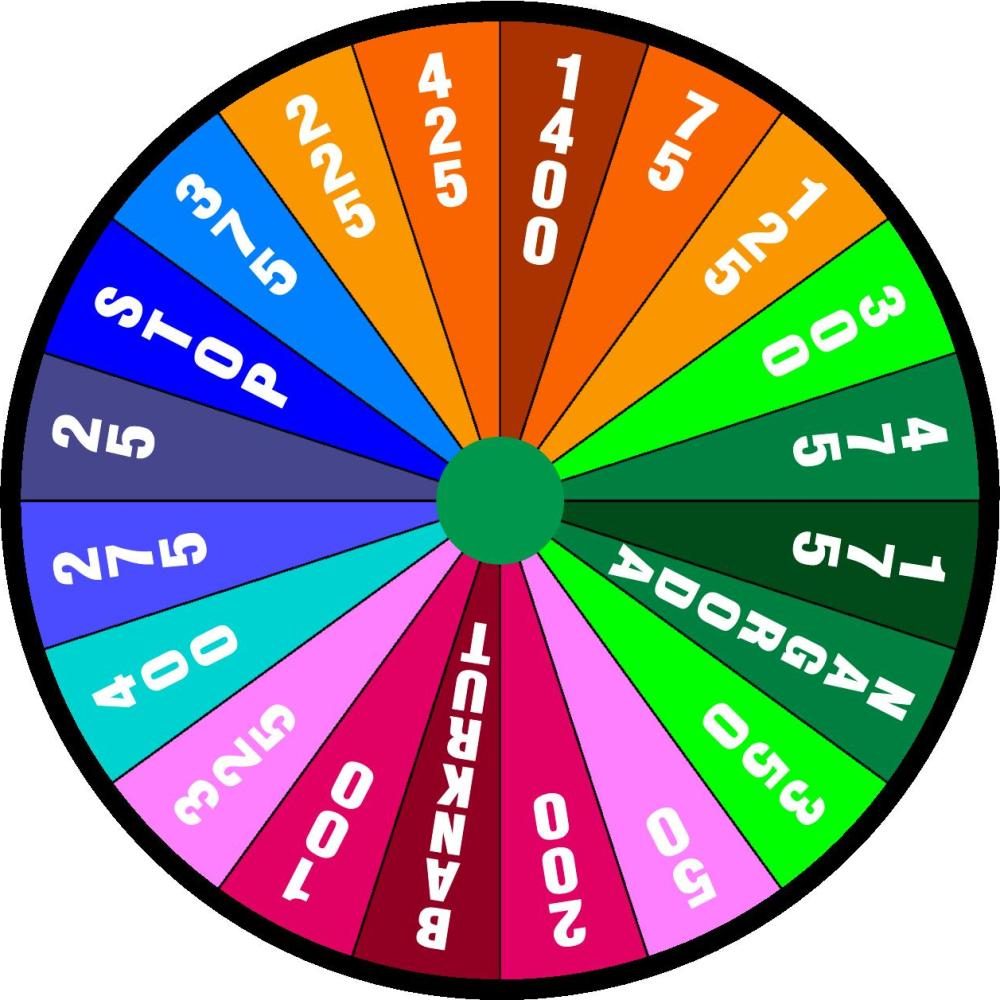
The round 2 layout with zł1400 as top value.

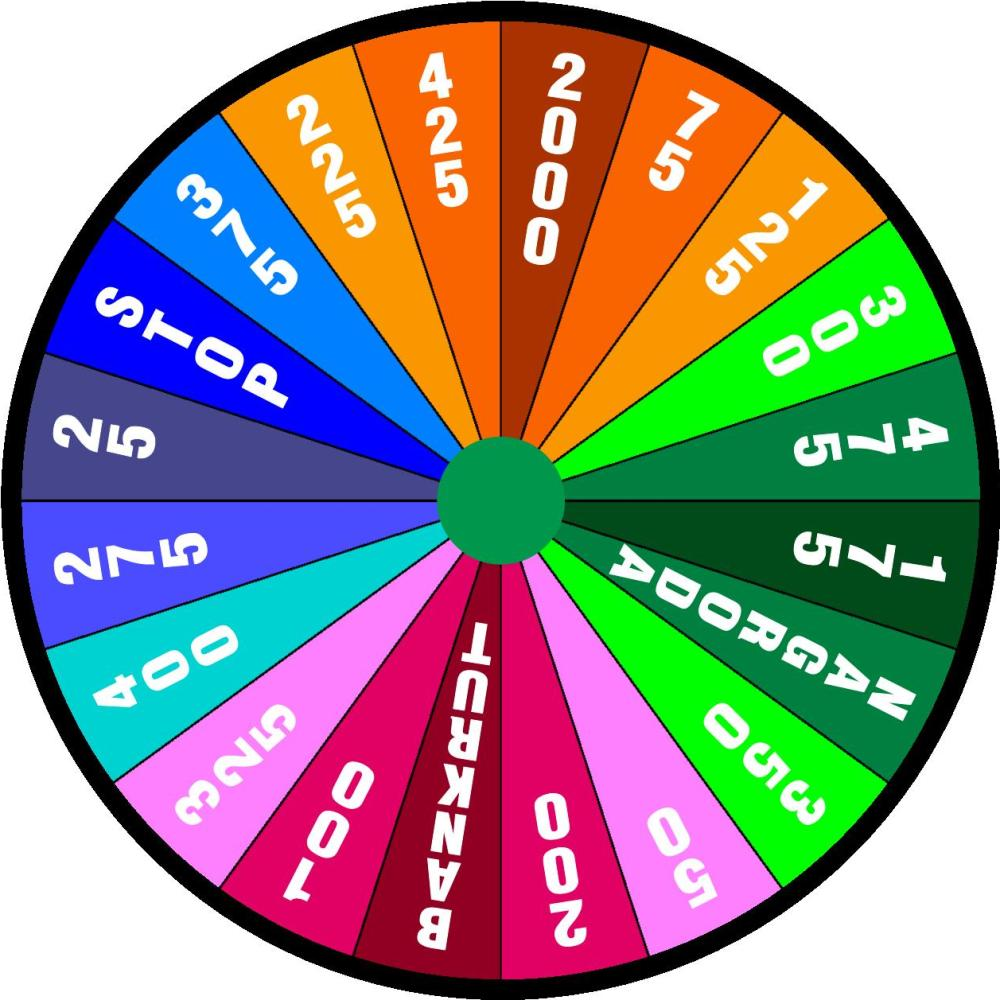
The round 3 layout with zł2000 as top value.

The layouts based on a March 2009 episode.

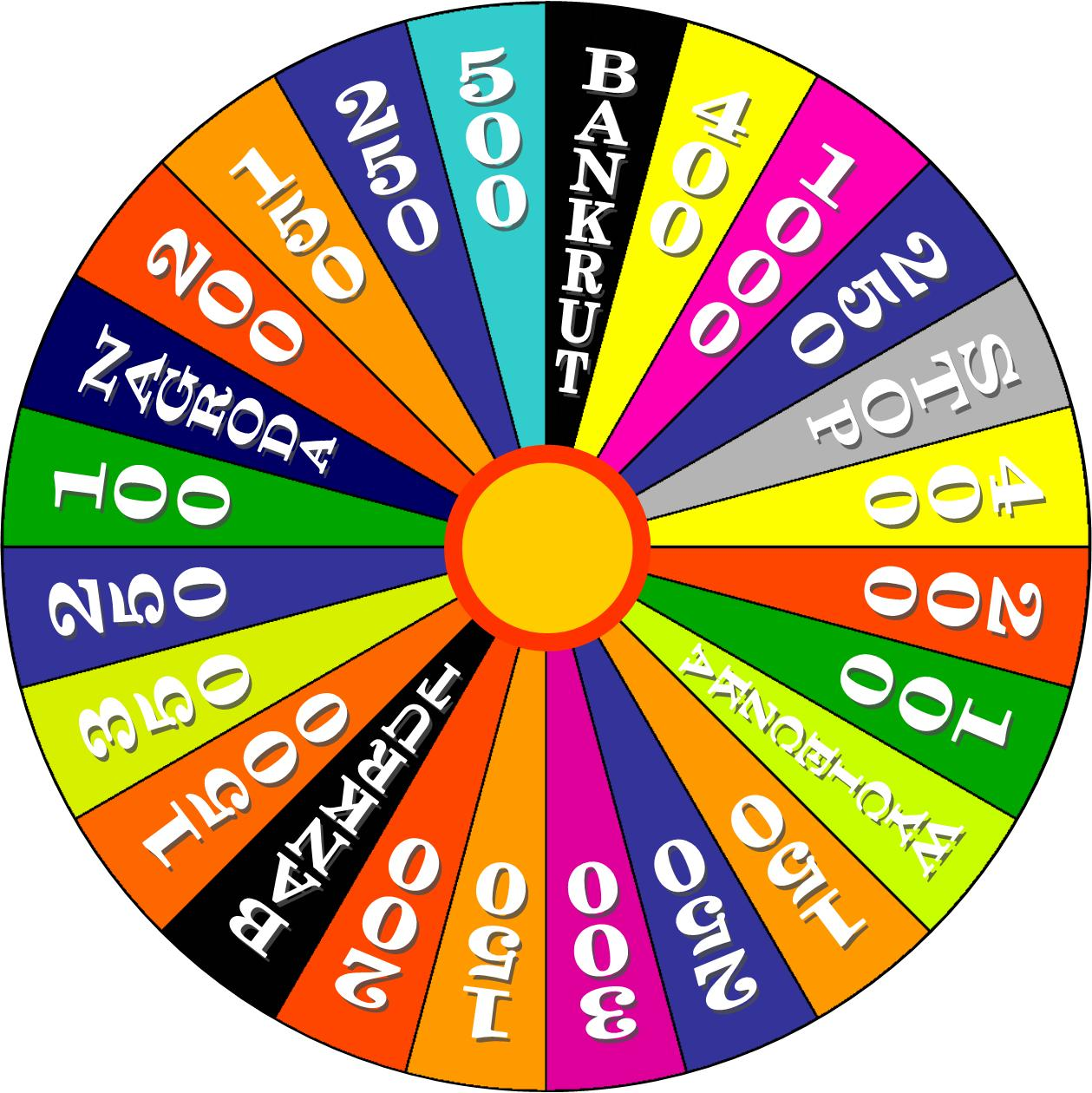
The round one layout with zł1500 as top value.

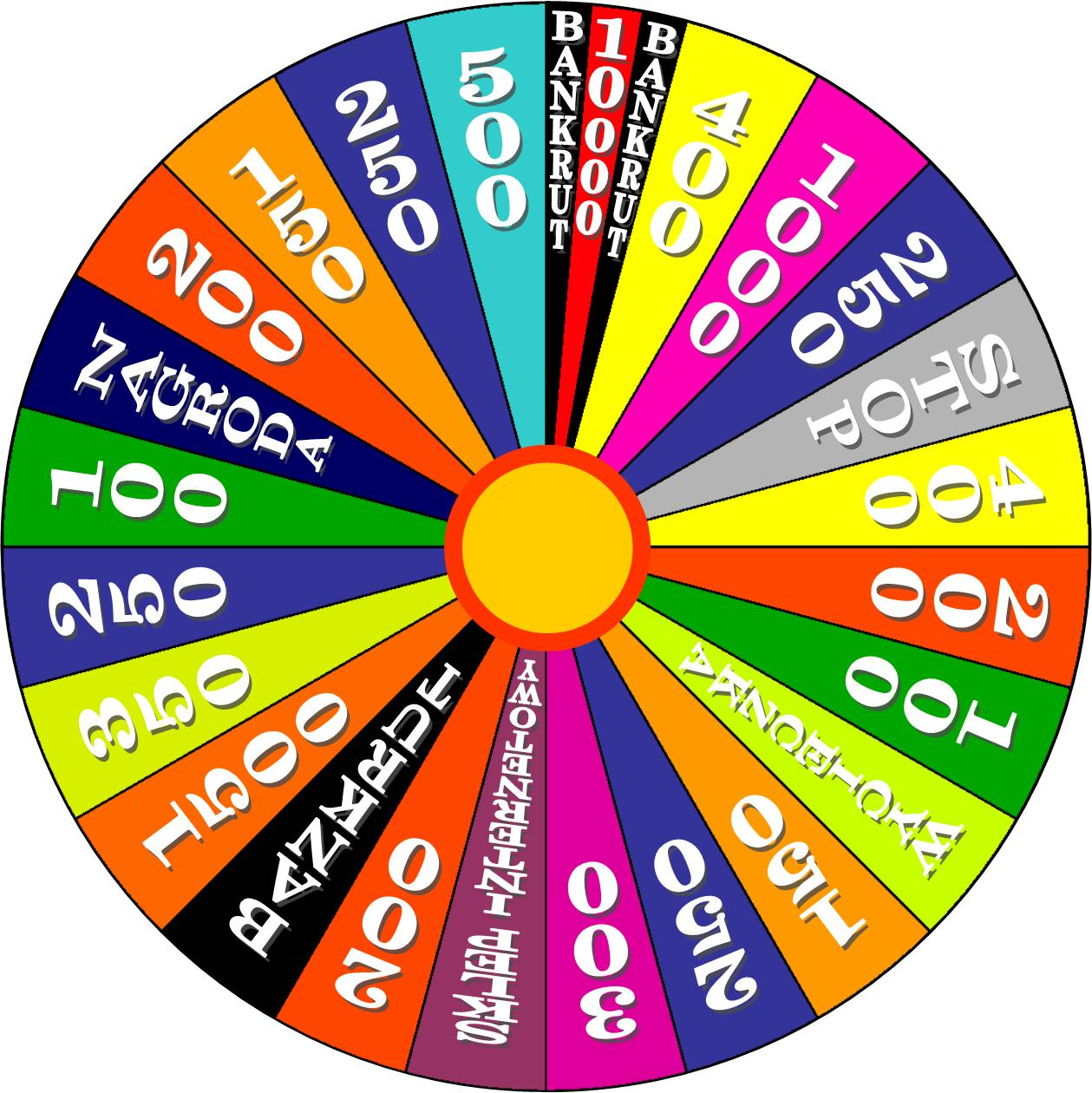
The round two layout with the zł10000 space.

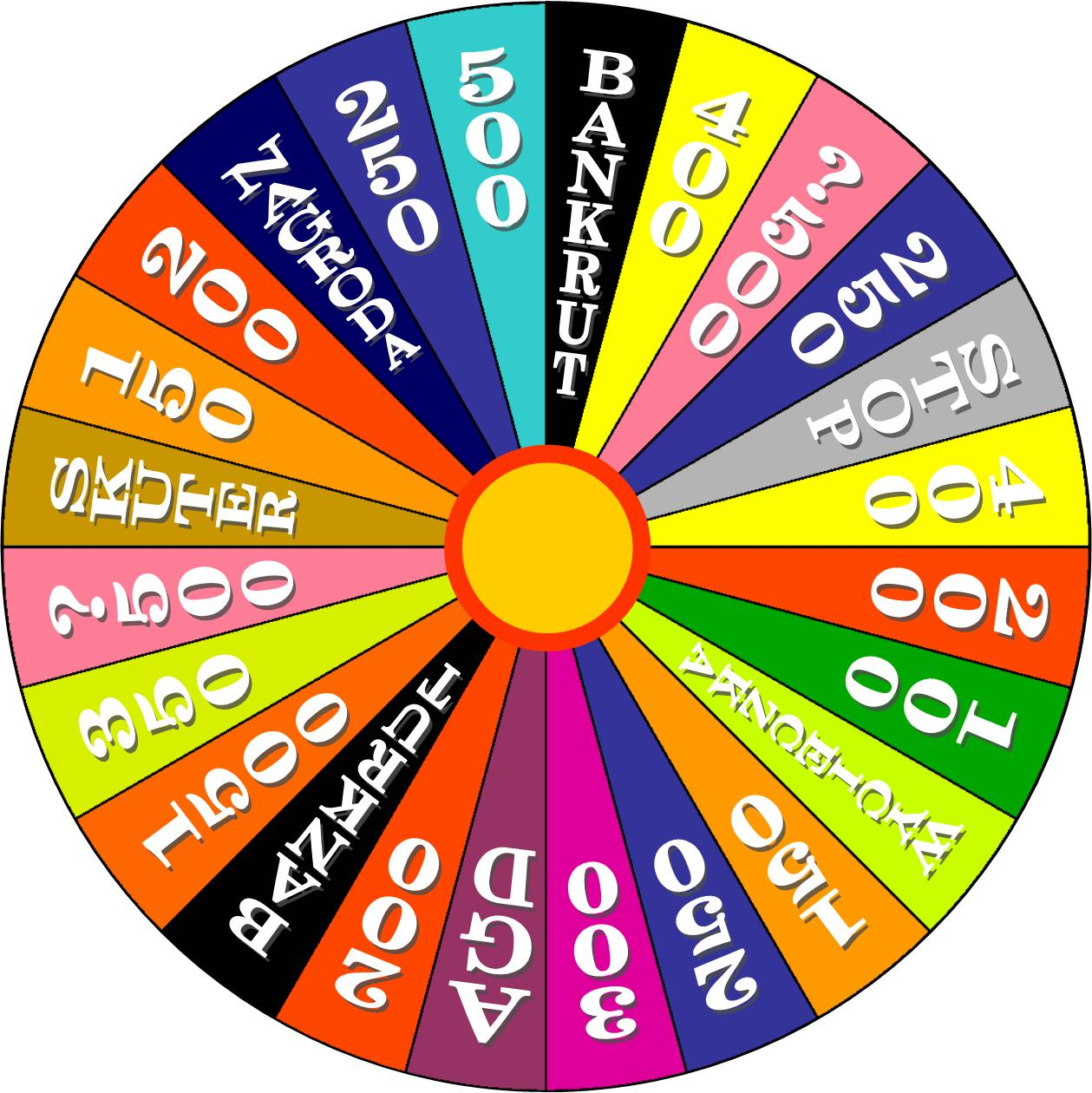
The round three layout with mystery wedges.

== 2017 version ==
The show returned to TVP2 in 2017, now hosted by singer Rafał Brzozowski and Izabella Krzan, Miss Polonia 2016. As part of the debut, producers CBS Studios International and Sony Pictures Television brought Pat Sajak (an ethnic Pole; grandfather was born in Poland) for an appearance, congratulating the show and its host on making its comeback to Poland. The show also features a live house band "RBand" (similar to the Romanian and Turkish versions of Wheel), and airs in a daytime slot instead of a primetime slot, seven times per week.

Two toss-up puzzles are played. The first is worth 500 zloty, played before the first round, and the second, worth 1,000 zloty, is played before the fifth round. The first toss-up determines who starts the round first. Again, vowels cost 200 zlotys.

The Speed-Up round is played as the second round of the game. The host's spin matches with the middle player's podium.

There is now a wedge that says "NIESPODZIANKA" ("Surprise"), which varies each time it is hit. The host always announces what the surprise is before the contestant is asked to choose a consonant. If the letter is in the puzzle, the host will then detach the wedge before replacing it with a cash wedge (usually a Swiss watch, leather goods etc.). The traditional "NAGRODA" ("Prize") space remains, and is also detached. Prizes are usually expensive, than surprises (household goods, spa travel etc.). As usual, the contestant must solve the puzzle in that round without hitting the Bankrupt space to win the prize.

For the new season starting on August 31, 2020, the Free Play ("GRAJ DALEJ" -- "Play On") and Wild Card ("ZŁOTA KARTA" -- "Gold Card") wedges were added to the wheel.

The top values are now 1,500 zloty for the first regular round, 2,000 for the second, and 5,000 for the third. The spaces worth 1,000; 2,500 and 3,000 surrounded by two small Bankrupt wedges can also be found on the wheel.

The mystery wedge rules remain the same as in the 2007–09 version. The player must decide to unveil the mystery wedge before being asked for the letter, and if one mystery wedge is unveiled, the other is immediately removed. The player must decide to flip the wedge or 500 zloty per letter or flip the wedge. If the wedge is Bankrupt, the turn ends. If the contestant decides not to flip the wedge and play for 500 zloty per letter, or wedge is the larger cash prize (2000 zł for Round 2 and 5000 zł for Round 5), the host asks the player for a letter.

The bonus round is played for cash prizes of 10,000, 15,000, 20,000, 25,000, 30,000, 35,000, 40,000, 45,000, 50,000 or 100,000 zloty, with a car prize sometimes offered. The standard rules of the current United States version are used.

In 2019, Norbert "Norbi" Dudziuk became the new host, replacing Rafał Brzozowski. Brzozowski now hosts the program previously hosted by Norbi, Jaka to Melodia (the Polish version of Name That Tune).

=== Sound Effects and Music ===
- Category: a repeating glissando on an electronic keyboard
- Buzz-in sound: A guitar D-major chord. Played only during the toss-up puzzles.
- Letter in puzzle: A traditional C-note game show ding (similar to the ding from the American version of The Price Is Right). The squares light up in green; the hostess then touches each letter to make it appear, and each letter she touches is accompanied by a B-flat pitch.
- Letter not in puzzle: A guitar downward riff.
- Bankrupt/Time's up/Puzzle not solved: A downward cue on a keyboard.
- Wild Card: A very special music, after adding one vowel worth 500 zlotys, a cheer effect appears.

A pre-recorded track plays when the contestant whose turn it is solves a puzzle, followed by a cue from the live house band. The band uses a different cue if the bonus round is won. Also, if a prize or large amount is hit, the live band will sometimes play a cue if the letter(s) is/are in the puzzle.
