= Tak to leciało! =

- Show’s logo (first run, 2008–2012)
- Presented by: Maciej Miecznikowski (series 1–9); Sławomir Zapała (series 10–13); Magdalena "Kajra" Kajrowicz (hostess, series 10–13); Kacper Kuszewski (series 14–15)
- Theme music composer: The Doobie Brothers (first run, 2008–2012)
- Country of origin: Poland
- Original language: Polish
- No. of seasons: 15
- No. of episodes: 189

Production
- Running time: ca. 45–50 minutes
- Production companies: Mastiff Media Polska (Note: In 2012 renamed to Golden Media Polska.) (series 1–9); Endemol Shine Polska (series 10–)

Original release
- Network: TVP2
- Release: March 9, 2008 – May 20, 2012
- Release: September 4, 2022 – present

Tak to leciało! (translating to It was sung this way! or That’s the way it was sung!) is the Polish version of the Don't Forget the Lyrics! franchise. The show debuted on March 9, 2008 on TVP2. Maciej Miecznikowski served as the host during the original run; the revival series was hosted primarily by Sławomir Zapała and Magdalena “Kajra” Kajrowicz as his assistant, but they were later replaced by Kacper Kuszewski. The grand prize on the show is PLN 100,000 (formerly PLN 150,000).

== Transmissions ==
Series	Episodes	First aired	Last aired
1	1–14 (14)	9 March 2008	15 June 2008
2	15–30 (16)	7 September 2008	28 December 2008
3	31–45 (15)	8 March 2009	14 June 2009
4	46–59 (14)	6 September 2009	27 December 2009
5	60–72 (13)	7 March 2010	13 June 2010
6	73–87 (15)	11 September 2010	12 December 2010
7	88–100 (13)	27 February 2011	29 May 2011
8	101–113 (13)	11 September 2011	11 December 2011
9	114–125 (12)	4 March 2012	20 May 2012
10	126–138 (13)	4 September 2022	25 December 2022
11	139–146 (8)	1 January 2023	19 February 2023
12	147–159 (13)	3 September 2023	26 December 2023
13	160–168 (9)	3 March 2024	28 April 2024
14	169–181 (13)	12 September 2024	26 December 2024
15	182–189 (8)	6 March 2025	8 May 2025

== Rules ==
The rules are roughly the same as the original version. The only significant difference from the original version of "Don't Forget the Lyrics!" is the prizes awarded.

Correct song lines	Prize value		
Correct song lines	Series 1–8	Series 9	Series 10–
1	PLN 500		PLN 500
2	PLN 1,000		PLN 1,000
3	PLN 1,500		PLN 2,000
4	PLN 2,000		PLN 5,000
4	(Guaranteed sum)		
5	PLN 4,000		PLN 7,000
6	PLN 8,000		PLN 10,000
7	PLN 15,000		PLN 15,000
8	PLN 25,000		PLN 30,000
8	(Guaranteed sum for final song)		
9	PLN 50,000		PLN 50,000
10	PLN 150,000	PLN 100,000	PLN 100,000
10	(Grand Prize)		
