= Miłość w Zakopanem =

2017 single by Sławomir

Single by Sławomir

from the album The Greatest Hits
- Language: Polish
- Released: April 23, 2017
- Genre: Rock/Polo
- Label: Agora

Miłość w Zakopanem (English: Love in Zakopane) is the fourth single by Polish Rock/Polo musician Sławomir, part of his debut album "The Greatest Hits", released in 2017. After release, the song became a hit within Poland. In 2018, it reached number 4 on the OLiS Chart. It was also certified 4× diamond on the same chart in 2021. The song became his most popular, earning reportedly earning him over 800.000 PLN.
