= Sonda (TV series) =

- Genre: Popular science
- Presented by: Andrzej Kurek, Zdzisław Kamiński
- Theme music composer: Mike Vickers
- Opening theme: Visitation
- Country of origin: Poland
- Original language: Polish
- No. of episodes: approx. 490

Production
- Running time: under 30 min.
- Production company: Telewizja Polska

Original release
- Network: TP1
- Release: 8 September 1977 – 1989

Sonda (English: Probe) was a popular Polish television science series broadcast between 1977 and 1989. It was presented by economist Zdzisław Kamiński and physicist Andrzej Kurek. Over 12 years of broadcasting, the program became the most popular and appreciated science TV show in Poland, achieving cult status for a generation. The program ended with the death of its hosts in a car accident on September 29, 1989.

The program's popularity stems from its unique formula, which involved addressing a specific scientific or technological problem in each episode. The show was formatted as a “never-ending” discussion between a skeptic and an enthusiast (Kamiński and Kurek), who carried out hands-on demonstrations and experiments to illustrate their arguments. The discussion contained elements of humor and performance: the hosts were often dressed up in costumes. The show was interspersed with documentary footage presenting a broader view of the issues discussed.

== Production ==
A total of 529 episodes were broadcast. Many of the broadcast tapes have been erased (reused for newer episodes), however, a few deleted episodes, which persisted in private recordings (VCR or U-Matic) were set in 2023 into YouTube.

The program is notable for its use of music, much of it by electronic music artists such as Vangelis and Jean-Michel Jarre, or by artists associated with the Sonoton Production Music Library label. The theme tune was a slightly shortened version of an instrumental piece called "Visitation", composed and recorded in 1971 by Mike Vickers (a former member of Manfred Mann).

The opening and end titles of later editions were prepared by Kurek using his ZX Spectrum.
