= International versions of Who Wants to Be a Millionaire? =

Countries of the world that have or had their own licensed version of Who Wants to Be a Millionaire? as of October 2025.

This table lists all international variants in the television game show franchise Who Wants to Be a Millionaire? that have been broadcast since the debut of the original British version of the show on 4 September 1998.

== International versions ==
Legend:

Currently airing
No longer airing
Upcoming or returning version

A † symbol following a name indicates that the host of the program has died.

Countries/regions	Title	Host	Network	Top prize	Premiere	Finale	Current/last used format
Afghanistan (Pashto)	څوك غواري چې شي میلیونر؟ Sok Ghwari Chi Shi Millonar?	Aryan Khan; Najeeba Fais	Shamshad TV; ATN	Afs. 1,000,000	October 17, 2008	November 1, 2011	Original format
Afghanistan (Persian)	کی ميخواهد میلیونر شود؟ Ki Mikhahad Milyuner Shawad?	Walid Soroor; Khatera Yusufi; Mustafa Sadat	ATN	Afs. 1,000,000	June 25, 2010	October 30, 2011	Original format
Albania Kosovo	Kush do të bëhet milioner?	Veton Ibrahimi	RTK1; TV Klan	€50,000	December 15, 2008	April 27, 2009	Original format
Albania Kosovo	Kush do të bëhet milioner?	Fehmi Ferati	RTK1; TV Klan	€50,000	September 27, 2009	June 7, 2010	Original format
Albania Kosovo	Kush do të bëhet milioner?	Agron Llakaj	RTK1; TV Klan	€50,000	September 17, 2010	July 30, 2012	Original format
Albania Kosovo	Kush do të bëhet milioner?	Enkel Demi	RTSH	€25,000	March 7, 2014	June 6, 2014	Original format or Risk format (contestant's choice)
Angola	Quem quer ser milionário?	Jorge Antunes	TV Zimbo	Kz 3,000,000	2009	2010	Original format
Arab Maghreb	من سيربح المليون؟ Man sayarbah al-malyoon?	Rachid El Ouali	Nessma TV	€500,000	August 22, 2009	September 3, 2010	Original format
(Arab League) Arab world	من سيربح المليون؟ Man sayarbah al-malyoon?	George Kordahi	MBC 1	SR 1,000,000	November 27, 2000	May 2004	Original format
(Arab League) Arab world	من سيربح 2 مليون؟ Man sayarbah 2 malyoon?	George Kordahi	MBC 1	SR 2,000,000	November 2005	June 2007	Original format (with 4 lifelines)
(Arab League) Arab world	من سيربح المليون؟ Man sayarbah al-malyoon?	George Kordahi	MBC 1	SR 1,000,000	January 12, 2010	August 3, 2010	12-question format (with 4 lifelines)
(Arab League) Arab world	المليونير – الحلقة الأقوى; El milyoner – Elhalka elaqwa	Mayssa Maghrebi	Dubai TV	AED 1,000,000	April 17, 2013	January 12, 2014	Hot Seat format
(Arab League) Arab world	من سيربح المليون؟ Man sayarbah al-malyoon?	George Kordahi	OSN Yahala HD	SR 2,000,000	October 16, 2015	April 8, 2016	Original format (with 4 lifelines)
(Arab League) Arab world	من سيربح المليون؟ Man sayarbah al-malyoon?	George Kordahi	MBC 1	SR 1,000,000	September 18, 2021		Original format (with 4 lifelines)
(Arab League) Arab world	من سيربح المليون؟ Man sayarbah al-malyoon?	Kosai Khauli	Dubai TV	AED 1,000,000	November 11, 2024		Original format (with 4 lifelines)
Argentina	¿Quién quiere ser millonario?	Julián Weich	El Trece	AR$1,000,000	May 24, 2001	September 26, 2002	Original format
Argentina	¿Quién quiere ser millonario?	Santiago del Moro	Telefe	AR$2,000,000	April 8, 2019	February 23, 2020	Original format (with 4 lifelines)
Armenia	Ո՞վէ ուզում դառնալ միլիոնատեր Ov e uzum darnal milionater?	Ashot Adamyan	AMPTV; Shant TV	5,000,000֏	April 5, 2003	July 2003	Original format
Armenia	Ո՞վէ ուզում դառնալ միլիոնատեր Ov e uzum darnal milionater?	Mark Saghatelyan†	AMPTV; Shant TV	5,000,000֏	August 2003	2005	Original format
Armenia	Ո՞վէ ուզում դառնալ միլիոնատեր Ov e uzum darnal milionater?	Arman Saghatelyan	AMPTV; Shant TV	5,000,000֏	2005	July 2007	Original format
Armenia	Ո՞վէ ուզում դառնալ միլիոնատեր Ov e uzum darnal milionater?	Akop Rubinyan	AMPTV; Shant TV	5,000,000֏	December 3, 2007	May 13, 2009	Original format
Armenia	Ո՞վէ ուզում դառնալ միլիոնատեր Ov e uzum darnal milionater?	Avet Barseghyan	AMPTV; Shant TV	5,000,000֏	July 18, 2009	January 5, 2011	Original format (with 4th lifeline since the first guaranteed sum)
Armenia	Ո՞վէ ուզում դառնալ միլիոնատեր Ov e uzum darnal milionater?	Egor Glumov	AMPTV; Shant TV	5,000,000֏	May 1, 2011	July 31, 2011	Original format (with 4th lifeline since the first guaranteed sum)
Armenia	Ո՞վէ ուզում դառնալ միլիոնատեր Ov e uzum darnal milionater?	Avet Barseghyan	AMPTV; Shant TV	5,000,000֏	October 19, 2011	January 4, 2015	Original format (with 4th lifeline since the first guaranteed sum)
Armenia	Ո՞վէ ուզում դառնալ միլիոնատեր Ov e uzum darnal milionater?	Aram Chakhoyan	AMPTV	10,000,000֏	April 4, 2026		Original format (with 4 lifelines and second guaranteed sum chosen by player (Note: A contestant can only use 3 of the 4 different lifelines.))
Australia	Who Wants To Be A Millionaire?	Eddie McGuire	Nine Network	AU$1,000,000	April 18, 1999	April 10, 2000	11-question format
Australia	Who Wants To Be A Millionaire?	Eddie McGuire	Nine Network	AU$1,000,000	May 22, 2000	April 3, 2006	Original format
Australia	Who Wants To Be A Millionaire?	Eddie McGuire	Nine Network	AU$5,000,000	October 22, 2007	November 26, 2007	16-question format
Australia	Who Wants To Be A Millionaire?	Eddie McGuire	Nine Network	AU$1,000,000	February 27, 2010	March 6, 2010	Original format
Australia	Who Wants To Be A Millionaire?	Eddie McGuire	Nine Network	AU$1,000,000	January 25, 2021	May 13, 2021	Original format
Australia	Who Wants To Be A Millionaire?	TBA	Network Ten	AU$1,000,000	2026		Original format
Australia	Millionaire Hot Seat	Eddie McGuire	Nine Network	AU$1,000,000	April 20, 2009	January 20, 2017	Hot Seat format
Australia	Millionaire Hot Seat	Eddie McGuire	Nine Network	AU$1,000,000	January 23, 2017	November 29, 2023	Hot Seat format (with 15-question Fastest Finger First and lifelines available)
Australia	Millionaire Hot Seat	Rebecca Gibney	Network Ten	AU$1,000,000	February 2, 2026		Hot Seat format
Austria	Alles ist möglich – Die 10-Millionen Show	Rainhard Fendrich	ORF 1	ATS 10,000,000; ATS 500,000 (Celebrity edition)	January 24, 2000	January 31, 2000	Original format
Austria	Die Millionenshow	Barbara Stöckl	ORF 1	ATS 10,000,000; ATS 500,000 (Celebrity edition)	May 29, 2000	December 2001	Original format
Austria	Die Millionenshow	Barbara Stöckl	ORF 1	€1,000,000 €50,000 (Celebrity edition) (2002–10) €75,000 (Celebrity edition) (2010–present) €100,000 (Junior edition) (2007–present)	January 11, 2002	May 11, 2002	Original format
Austria	Die Millionenshow	Armin Assinger	ORF 1	€1,000,000 €50,000 (Celebrity edition) (2002–10) €75,000 (Celebrity edition) (2010–present) €100,000 (Junior edition) (2007–present)	September 9, 2002	March 19, 2010	Original format or Risk format (contestant's choice)
Austria	Die Millionenshow	Armin Assinger	ORF 2	€1,000,000 €50,000 (Celebrity edition) (2002–10) €75,000 (Celebrity edition) (2010–present) €100,000 (Junior edition) (2007–present)	2005		Original format or Risk format (contestant's choice)
Azerbaijan	Milyonçu – Dövlətli olmaq istərdinmi?	İlhamiyyə Rzayeva	Lider TV	100,000,000m	August 9, 2002	2002	Original format
Azerbaijan	Milyonçu – Dövlətli olmaq istərdinmi?	Azer Axşam	Lider TV	100,000,000m	2002	2006	Original format
Azerbaijan	Milyonçu – Dövlətli olmaq istərdinmi?	Azer Axşam	Lider TV	20,000₼	January 2007	2007	Original format
Azerbaijan	Kim zəngin olmaq istəyir? – Milyonların şousu	DJ Fateh	İctimai TV	100,000₼	October 3, 2021		Original format (with second guaranteed sum chosen by player)
Bangladesh	কে হতে চায় কোটিপতি Ke Hotey Chay Kotipoti	Asaduzzaman Noor	Desh TV	৳1,00,00,000/-	July 10, 2011	November 2, 2011	Original format
Belgium (Dutch)	Wie Wordt Multimiljonair?	Walter Grootaers	VTM	Fr. 20,000,000	August 31, 1999	May 27, 2001	Original format
Belgium (Dutch)	Wie Wordt Euromiljonair?	Walter Grootaers	VTM	€1,000,000	December 5, 2001	December 28, 2005	Original format
Belgium (Dutch)	Wie wordt Miljonair?	Staf Coppens	VTM	€1,000,000	August 7, 2017 (season 1)	August 24, 2017 (season 1)	Hot Seat format (with 5-question Fastest Finger First and lifelines available)
Belgium (Dutch)	Wie wordt Miljonair?	Staf Coppens	VTM	€1,000,000	July 30, 2018 (season 2)	August 30, 2018 (season 2)	Hot Seat format (with 5-question Fastest Finger First and lifelines available)
Belgium (French)	Qui sera millionnaire?	Alain Simons	RTL-TVI	Fr. 10,000,000	August 28, 2000	December 24, 2001	Original format
Belgium (French)	Qui sera millionnaire?	Alain Simons	RTL-TVI	€1,000,000	December 31, 2001	April 25, 2005	Original format
Belgium (French)	Qui sera millionnaire?	Alain Simons	RTL-TVI	€1,000,000	September 8, 2008	October 13, 2008	Original format
Brazil	Quem quer ser um milionário?	Luciano Huck	TV Globo	R$1,000,000	May 6, 2017	December 26, 2021	Original format
Brazil	Quem quer ser um milionário?	Luciano Huck	TV Globo	R$1,000,000	October 16, 2022		Original format (with 4 lifelines and second guaranteed sum chosen by player)
Bulgaria	Стани Богат; Stani Bogat	Niki Kanchev	Nova TV	100,000 lv.	May 12, 2001	February 23, 2007	Original format
Bulgaria	Стани Богат; Stani Bogat	Niki Kanchev	Nova TV	200,000 lv.	January 7, 2008	July 3, 2008	Original format (with 4th lifeline available since the first guaranteed sum)
Bulgaria	Стани Богат; Stani Bogat	Niki Kanchev	Nova TV	200,000 lv.	January 12, 2009	July 3, 2009	12-question format
Bulgaria	Стани Богат; Stani Bogat	Niki Kanchev	Nova TV	100,000 lv.	September 23, 2010	May 30, 2014	12-question format
Bulgaria	Стани Богат; Stani Bogat	Mihail Bilalov	BNT 1	100,000 lv.	April 1, 2018	January 26, 2020	Original format
Bulgaria	Стани Богат; Stani Bogat	Mihail Bilalov	bTV	100,000 lv.	December 20, 2021	December 8, 2023	Original format (with 4 lifelines and second guaranteed sum chosen by player)
Bulgaria	Стани Богат; Stani Bogat	Niki Kanchev	bTV	100,000 lv.	February 17, 2024	December 13, 2025	Original format (with 4 lifelines and second guaranteed sum chosen by player)
Bulgaria	Стани Богат; Stani Bogat	Niki Kanchev	bTV	€100,000	February 16, 2026	May 8, 2026	Original format (with 4 lifelines and second guaranteed sum chosen by player)
Bulgaria	Стани Богат; Stani Bogat	Niki Kanchev	bTV	€100,000 (classic format) €125,000 (risk format)	September 7, 2026		Original format or Risk format (contestant's choice)
Cambodia	អ្នកនឹងក្លាយជាសេដ្ឋី Neak Neng Klay Chea Sethey	Ith Setha	CTN	100,000,000៛	June 29, 2013	May 28, 2016	Original format
Canada	Who Wants to Be a Millionaire: Canadian Edition	Pamela Wallin	CTV	CA$1,000,000	September 13, 2000	September 14, 2000	Original format
Chile	¿Quién quiere ser millonario?	Don Francisco	Canal 13	CL$100,000,000	April 2, 2001	2002	Original format
Chile	¿Quién quiere ser millonario?	Sergio Lagos	Canal 13	CL$65,000,000	2003	2004	Original format
Chile	¿Quién merece ser millonario?	Don Francisco	Canal 13	CL$100,000,000	July 2006	July 2008	Original format (with 4 lifelines)
Chile	¿Quién merece ser millonario?	Sergio Lagos	Canal 13	CL$120,000,000	September 2, 2010	December 30, 2010	Original format (with 4 lifelines)
Chile	¿Quién quiere ser millonario?: Alta tensión	Diana Bolocco	Canal 13	CL$120,000,000	January 4, 2011	January 15, 2012	Hot Seat format
Chile	¿Quién quiere ser millonario?: Alta tensión	Sergio Lagos	Canal 13	CL$120,000,000	March 5, 2012	November 30, 2012	Hot Seat format
Chile	¿Quién quiere ser millonario?	Diana Bolocco	MEGA	CL$100,000,000	October 10, 2019	2021	Original format (with 4 lifelines)
China	百万智多星; Bǎi Wàn Zhì Duō Xīng	Lǐ Fán	GuiZhou TV	¥1,000,000 RMB	September 29, 2007	April 19, 2008	Original format
Colombia	¿Quién quiere ser millonario?	Paulo Laserna Phillips	Caracol	CO$200,000,000	September 2, 2000	2001	Original format
Colombia	¿Quién quiere ser millonario?	Paulo Laserna Phillips	Caracol	CO$210,000,000	2001	2007	Original format
Colombia	¿Quién quiere ser millonario?	Paulo Laserna Phillips	Caracol	CO$300,000,000	2008	December 10, 2011	Original format (with 4th lifeline available since the second guaranteed sum)
Colombia	¿Quién quiere ser millonario?	Paulo Laserna Phillips	RCN	CO$300,000,000	March 10, 2013	November 7, 2015	Original format (with 4th lifeline available since the second guaranteed sum)
Colombia	¿Quién quiere ser millonario? Silla Caliente	Paulo Laserna Phillips	RCN	CO$300,000,000	March 24, 2013	May 12, 2013	Hot Seat format (only with celebrity contestants)
Costa Rica	¿Quién quiere ser millonario?	Ignacio Santos Pasamontes	Teletica	₡25,000,000	February 3, 2009	February 28, 2012	Original format
Costa Rica	¿Quién quiere ser millonario?	Ignacio Santos Pasamontes	Teletica	₡30,000,000	February 19, 2013	September 3, 2013	Original format
Costa Rica	¿Quién quiere ser millonario?	Ignacio Santos Pasamontes	Teletica	₡30,000,000	April 27, 2021	May 31, 2022	Original format
Costa Rica	¿Quién quiere ser millonario?	Gustavo Rojas (Note: To temporarily stand in for Ignacio Santos Pasamontes who was ill.)	Teletica	₡30,000,000	June 7, 2022	July 5, 2022	Original format
Costa Rica	¿Quién quiere ser millonario?	Ignacio Santos Pasamontes	Teletica	₡30,000,000	July 12, 2022	December 13, 2022	Original format
Costa Rica	¿Quién quiere ser millonario?	Ignacio Santos Pasamontes	Teletica	₡35,000,000	April 4, 2023	December 1, 2025	Original format
Costa Rica	¿Quién quiere ser millonario?	Edgar Silva	Teletica	₡35,000,000	March 3, 2026		Original format
Croatia	Tko želi biti milijunaš?	Tarik Filipović	HRT 1	1,000,000 kn.	March 24, 2002	June 3, 2010	Original format (Phone-a-Friend lifeline shortened from 30 to 25 seconds as of 2019)
Croatia	Tko želi biti milijunaš?	Tarik Filipović	HRT 1	1,000,000 kn.	September 19, 2019	December 29, 2022	Original format (Phone-a-Friend lifeline shortened from 30 to 25 seconds as of 2019)
Croatia	Tko želi biti milijunaš?	Tarik Filipović	HRT 1	€150,000	January 5, 2023		Original format (Phone-a-Friend lifeline shortened from 30 to 25 seconds as of 2019)
Czech Republic	Chcete být milionářem?	Vladimír Čech†	TV Nova	10,000,000 Kč	October 16, 2000	October 16, 2003	Original format
Czech Republic	Chcete být milionářem?	Martin Preiss	TV Nova	10,000,000 Kč	October 21, 2003	September 17, 2004	Original format
Czech Republic	Chcete být milionářem?	Ondřej Hejma	TV Nova	10,000,000 Kč	April 1, 2005	September 4, 2005	Original format
Czech Republic	Chcete být milionářem?	Marek Vašut	TV Nova	10,000,000 Kč	March 23, 2016	August 23, 2017	Original format or Risk format (contestant's choice)
Czech Republic	Milionář	Roman Šmucler	TV Prima	2,000,000 Kč	February 4, 2008	June 23, 2008	Original format (with 4th lifeline since the second guaranteed sum)
Denmark	Hvem vil være millionær?	Peter Kær	TV2	DKr 1,000,000	September 9, 1999	April 9, 2001	Original format (Phone-a-Friend lifeline shortened from 30 to 25 seconds as of 2019)
Denmark	Hvem vil være millionær?	Jes Dorph Petersen	TV2	DKr 1,000,000	September 3, 2001	May 26, 2003	Original format (Phone-a-Friend lifeline shortened from 30 to 25 seconds as of 2019)
Denmark	Hvem vil være millionær?	Peter Kær	TV2	DKr 1,000,000	September 1, 2003	October 12, 2006	Original format (Phone-a-Friend lifeline shortened from 30 to 25 seconds as of 2019)
Denmark	Hvem vil være millionær?	Hans Pilgaard	TV2	DKr 1,000,000	February 15, 2007	May 27, 2018	Original format (Phone-a-Friend lifeline shortened from 30 to 25 seconds as of 2019)
Denmark	Hvem vil være millionær?	Christian Degn	TV2	DKr 1,000,000	October 13, 2019	April 8, 2023	Original format (Phone-a-Friend lifeline shortened from 30 to 25 seconds as of 2019)
Denmark	Hvem vil være millionær: Alle mod alle	Hans Pilgaard	TV2	DKr 2,000,000	October 12, 2009	October 19, 2009	Hot Seat format
Ecuador	¿Quién quiere ser millonario?	Alfonso Espinosa de los Monteros	Ecuavisa	US$25,000	November 21, 2001	February 29, 2004	Original format
Ecuador	¿Quién quiere ser millonario?	Alfonso Espinosa de los Monteros	Ecuavisa	US$50,000	August 23, 2009	November 28, 2011	Original format
Ecuador	¿Quién quiere ser millonario?: Alta tensión	Estéfani Espín	Ecuavisa	US$100,000	July 1, 2012	December 23, 2012	Hot Seat format
Egypt	المليونير; El Milyoner	George Kordahi	Al-hayat TV	EG£ 1,000,000	July 20, 2012	October 29, 2012	Original format and Clock format (until the second guaranteed sum)
Egypt	المليونير; El Milyoner	George Kordahi	Al-hayat TV	EG£ 1,000,000	April 24, 2013	May 15, 2013	Original format and Clock format (until the second guaranteed sum)
El Salvador	¿Quién quiere ser millonario?	Willie Maldonado	TCS Canal 4	US$200,000	March 3, 2010	December 31, 2014	Original format
Estonia	Kes tahab saada miljonäriks?	Hannes Võrno	TV3	1,000,000 KR	September 8, 2002	December 3, 2008	Original format
Finland	Haluatko miljonääriksi?	Lasse Lehtinen	Nelonen	1,000,000 mk	November 12, 1999	December 9, 2001	Original format
Finland	Haluatko miljonääriksi?	Lasse Lehtinen	Nelonen	€200,000	February 24, 2002	May 15, 2005	Original format
Finland	Haluatko miljonääriksi?	Ville Klinga	MTV3	€1,000,000	September 3, 2005	March 4, 2007	Original format
Finland	Haluatko miljonääriksi?	Jaajo Linnonmaa	Nelonen	€1,000,000	January 23, 2016	October 17, 2020	Original format
Finland	Haluatko miljonääriksi?	Antti Holma	Nelonen	€1,000,000	August 27, 2022		Original format
France	Qui veut gagner des millions?	Jean-Pierre Foucault	TF1	3,000,000 F	July 3, 2000	July 21, 2000	Original format
France	Qui veut gagner des millions?	Jean-Pierre Foucault	TF1	4,000,000 F	September 30, 2000	July 7, 2001	Original format
France	Qui veut gagner des millions?	Jean-Pierre Foucault	TF1	1,000,000 €	September 8, 2001	January 19, 2019	Original format
France	Qui veut gagner des millions?	Camille Combal	TF1	1,000,000 €	January 26, 2019	August 16, 2019	Original format (with 4 lifelines)
France	Qui veut gagner des millions?	Arthur	TF1	1,000,000 €	September 20, 2024		Original format
France	Qui veut gagner des millions? – À la maison	Camille Combal	TF1	300,000 €	April 20, 2020	August 1, 2020	Original format (with 4 lifelines)
Georgia	ვის უნდა ოცი ათასი? Vis unda otsi atasi?	Duta Skhirtladze	Rustavi 2	20,000 ₾	September 1, 2000	June 9, 2005	Original format (with 4th lifeline since the second guaranteed sum)
Georgia	ვის უნდა ოცი ათასი? Vis unda otsi atasi?	Mamuka Gamkrelidze	Rustavi 2	20,000 ₾	September 23, 2009	July 26, 2011	Original format (with 4th lifeline since the second guaranteed sum)
Georgia	შენ შეგიძლია მოიგო ასი ათასი Shen shegidzlia moigo asi atasi	Dato Darchia	First Channel	100,000 ₾	March 1, 2026		Original format
Germany	Wer wird Millionär?	Günther Jauch	RTL	DM 1,000,000	September 3, 1999	December 22, 2001	Original format
Germany	Wer wird Millionär?	Günther Jauch	RTL	€1,000,000 €2,000,000 (Gamblers' Special) €3,000,000 (3 Million Euro Week specials)	January 4, 2002		Original format or Risk format (contestant's choice) and Clock format (Highspeed-Special only)
Ghana	Who Wants to Be Rich?	Kafui Dey	GTV	₵50,000	October 4, 2009	July 8, 2012	Original format
Greece Cyprus	Ποιος θέλει να γίνει εκατομμυριούχος? Poios thélei na gínei Ekatommyrioúchos?	Spiros Papadopoulos	Mega	₯50,000,000	October 4, 1999	December 31, 2001	Original format
Greece Cyprus	Ποιος θέλει να γίνει εκατομμυριούχος? Poios thélei na gínei Ekatommyrioúchos?	Spiros Papadopoulos	Mega	€150,000	January 1, 2002	June 28, 2002	Original format
Greece Cyprus	Ποιος θέλει να γίνει εκατομμυριούχος? Poios thélei na gínei Ekatommyrioúchos?	Spiros Papadopoulos	NET	€150,000	November 4, 2002	April 2, 2003	Original format
Greece Cyprus	Ποιος θέλει να γίνει εκατομμυριούχος? Poios thélei na gínei Ekatommyrioúchos?	Spiros Papadopoulos	ET1	€150,000	April 28, 2003	July 4, 2003	Original format
Greece Cyprus	Ποιος θέλει να γίνει εκατομμυριούχος? Poios thélei na gínei Ekatommyrioúchos?	Spiros Papadopoulos	NET	€150,000	September 15, 2003	May 28, 2004	Original format
Greece Cyprus	Ποιος θέλει να γίνει εκατομμυριούχος? Poios thélei na gínei Ekatommyrioúchos?	Theodoris Atheridis	Alpha TV	€250,000	April 10, 2006	July 28, 2006	Original format (with 4th lifeline since the first guaranteed sum)
Greece Cyprus	Ποιος θέλει να γίνει εκατομμυριούχος? Poios thélei na gínei Ekatommyrioúchos?	Grigoris Arnaoutoglou	ANT1	€100,000 €300,000 (Grand Prize Week specials)	April 25, 2022		Original format
Greece Cyprus	Millionaire Hot Seat	Yannis Zouganelis	Skai TV	€100,000	October 29, 2014	June 16, 2016	Hot Seat format
Guatemala	¿Quién quiere ser millonario?	Héctor Sandarti	Guatemala.com TV	Q100,000	July 12, 2023	May 1, 2024	Original format
Honduras	¿Quién quiere ser millonario?	Juan Carlos Pineda	Televicentro	L 1,000,000	July 2, 2012	2014	Original format
Hong Kong	百萬富翁; Baak Maan Fu Yung	Kenneth Chan	ATV	HK$1,000,000	April 29, 2001	March 20, 2005	Original format
Hong Kong	百萬富翁; Baak Maan Fu Yung	Stephen Chan	ATV	HK$1,000,000	January 29, 2018 (Note: Since ATV is no longer a TV station in 2018, the new series is available through ATV smartphone application only.)	June 1, 2018	Original format
Hungary	Legyen Ön is milliomos!	István Vágó†	RTL Klub	25,000,000 Ft.	February 29, 2000	October 13, 2000	Original format
Hungary	Legyen Ön is milliomos!	István Vágó†	RTL Klub	40,000,000 Ft.	October 16, 2000	June 1, 2007	Original format
Hungary	Legyen Ön is milliomos!	István Vágó†	RTL Klub	40,000,000 Ft.	January 28, 2008	February 29, 2008	Original format or Risk format (contestant's choice)
Hungary	Legyen Ön is milliomos!	Sándor Fábry	RTL Klub	40,000,000 Ft.	September 17, 2009	February 18, 2010	Original format (with 4 lifelines)
Hungary	Legyen Ön is milliomos!	Sándor Friderikusz	RTL Klub	40,000,000 Ft.	February 29, 2012	May 30, 2012	Original format (with 4 lifelines)
Hungary	Legyen Ön is milliomos!	Sándor Friderikusz	RTL II	40,000,000 Ft.	October 1, 2012	March 25, 2013	Original format (with 4 lifelines)
Hungary	Legyen Ön is milliomos!	Gábor Gundel Takács	TV2	50,000,000 Ft.	January 2, 2019	February 28, 2019	Original format (with 4 lifelines)
Hungary	Legyen Ön is milliomos!	László Palik	TV2	50,000,000 Ft.	November 18, 2024		Original format (with 4 lifelines)
Hungary	Legyen Ön is milliomos! – felpörgetve	Sándor Fábry	RTL Klub	40,000,000 Ft.	March 18, 2010	May 27, 2010	Hot Seat format
Iceland	Viltu vinna milljón?	Þorsteinn J.	Stöð 2	IKr 1,000,000	December 26, 2000	2001	Original format
Iceland	Viltu vinna milljón?	Þorsteinn J.	Stöð 2	IKr 5,000,000	September 30, 2001	2003	Original format
Iceland	Viltu vinna milljón?	Jónas R. Jónsson	Stöð 2	IKr 5,000,000	September 14, 2003	March 17, 2005	Original format
India (Hindi)	कौन बनेगा करोड़पति Kaun Banega Crorepati	Amitabh Bachchan	STAR Plus	Rs. 1,00,00,000/-	July 3, 2000	December 31, 2001	Original format
India (Hindi)	कौन बनेगा करोड़पति Kaun Banega Crorepati	Amitabh Bachchan	STAR Plus	Rs. 2,00,00,000/-	August 5, 2005	December 24, 2005	Original format (with 4 lifelines)
India (Hindi)	कौन बनेगा करोड़पति Kaun Banega Crorepati	Shah Rukh Khan	STAR Plus	Rs. 2,00,00,000/-	January 22, 2007	April 19, 2007	Original format (with 4 lifelines)
India (Hindi)	कौन बनेगा करोड़पति Kaun Banega Crorepati	Amitabh Bachchan	Sony TV	₹5,00,00,000/-	October 11, 2010	December 9, 2010	Original format and Clock format (until the second guaranteed sum)
India (Hindi)	कौन बनेगा करोड़पति Kaun Banega Crorepati	Amitabh Bachchan	Sony TV	₹5,00,00,000/-	August 15, 2011	January 26, 2013	Extra-high-risk format (with one guaranteed sum chosen by a player)
India (Hindi)	कौन बनेगा करोड़पति Kaun Banega Crorepati	Amitabh Bachchan	Sony TV	₹7,00,00,000/-	September 6, 2013	December 1, 2013	15-question format (Note: 12-question format with 3 bonus questions) and Clock format (until the second guaranteed sum) (with 5 lifelines)
India (Hindi)	कौन बनेगा करोड़पति Kaun Banega Crorepati	Amitabh Bachchan	Sony TV	₹7,00,00,000/-	August 18, 2014	November 16, 2014	14-question format (Note: 12-question format with 2 bonus questions) and Clock format (until the second guaranteed sum) (with 5 lifelines)
India (Hindi)	कौन बनेगा करोड़पति Kaun Banega Crorepati	Amitabh Bachchan	Sony TV	₹7,00,00,000/-	August 28, 2017	December 7, 2021	16-question format and Clock format (until the second guaranteed sum) (with 4 lifelines) (Phone-a-Friend lifeline extended from 30 to 45 seconds as of 2020)
India (Hindi)	कौन बनेगा करोड़पति Kaun Banega Crorepati	Amitabh Bachchan	Sony TV	₹7,50,00,000/-	August 7, 2022	December 30, 2022	17-question format and Clock format (until the second guaranteed sum)
India (Hindi)	कौन बनेगा करोड़पति Kaun Banega Crorepati	Amitabh Bachchan	Sony TV	₹7,00,00,000/-	August 14, 2023		16-question format and Clock format (until the second guaranteed sum)
India (Hindi)	Kaun Banega Crorepati Hot Seat	Amitabh Bachchan	Sony TV	₹1,00,00,000/-	November 1, 2010	November 4, 2010	Hot Seat format (with celebrity contestants)
India (Malayalam)	നിങ്ങൾക്കും ആകാം കോടീശ്വരൻ; Ningalkkum Aakaam Kodeeshwaran	Suresh Gopi	Asianet	₹1,00,00,000/-	April 9, 2012	June 23, 2017	Original format and clock format (until the second guaranteed sum)
India (Malayalam)	നിങ്ങൾക്കും ആകാം കോടീശ്വരൻ; Ningalkkum Aakaam Kodeeshwaran	Suresh Gopi	Mazhavil Manorama	₹1,00,00,000/-	November 11, 2019	March 31, 2020	Original format and clock format (until the second guaranteed sum)
India (Tamil)	நீங்களும் வெல்லலாம் ஒரு கோடி Neengalum Vellalam Oru Kodi	Suriya	Star Vijay	₹1,00,00,000/-	February 27, 2012	July 12, 2012	Original format and clock format (until the second guaranteed sum)
India (Tamil)	நீங்களும் வெல்லலாம் ஒரு கோடி Neengalum Vellalam Oru Kodi	Prakash Raj	Star Vijay	₹1,00,00,000/-	March 11, 2013	July 12, 2013	Original format and clock format (until the second guaranteed sum)
India (Tamil)	நீங்களும் வெல்லலாம் ஒரு கோடி Neengalum Vellalam Oru Kodi	Arvind Swamy	Star Vijay	₹1,00,00,000/-	May 30, 2016	November 19, 2016	Original format and clock format (until the second guaranteed sum)
India (Tamil)	கோடீஸ்வரி Kodeeswari	Radikaa Sarathkumar	Colors Tamil	₹1,00,00,000/-	December 23, 2019	February 14, 2020	Original format and clock format (until the second guaranteed sum) (only female contestants)
India (Telugu)	మీలో ఎవరు కోటీశ్వరుడు Meelo Evaru Koteeswarudu	Nagarjuna	Star Maa	₹1,00,00,000/-	June 9, 2014 (season 1)	August 14, 2014 (season 1)	Original format and clock format (until the second guaranteed sum)
India (Telugu)	మీలో ఎవరు కోటీశ్వరుడు Meelo Evaru Koteeswarudu	Nagarjuna	Star Maa	₹1,00,00,000/-	December 8, 2014 (season 2)	February 27, 2015 (season 2)	Original format and clock format (until the second guaranteed sum)
India (Telugu)	మీలో ఎవరు కోటీశ్వరుడు Meelo Evaru Koteeswarudu	Nagarjuna	Star Maa	₹1,00,00,000/-	November 27, 2015 (season 3)	May 22, 2016 (season 3)	Original format and clock format (until the second guaranteed sum)
India (Telugu)	మీలో ఎవరు కోటీశ్వరుడు Meelo Evaru Koteeswarudu	Chiranjeevi	Star Maa	₹1,00,00,000/-	February 13, 2017 (season 4)	May 24, 2017 (season 4)	Original format and clock format (until the second guaranteed sum)
India (Telugu)	ఎవరు మీలో కోటీశ్వరులు Evaru Meelo Koteeswarulu	N. T. Rama Rao Jr.	Gemini TV	₹1,00,00,000/-	August 22, 2021 (season 5)	December 5, 2021 (season 5)	Original format and clock format (until the second guaranteed sum)
India (Kannada)	ಕನ್ನಡದ ಕೋಟ್ಯಾಧಿಪತಿ Kannadada Kotyadhipati	Puneeth Rajkumar†	Star Suvarna	₹1,00,00,000/-	March 12, 2012	July 27, 2013	Original format and clock format (until the second guaranteed sum)
India (Kannada)	ಕನ್ನಡದ ಕೋಟ್ಯಾಧಿಪತಿ Kannadada Kotyadhipati	Ramesh Aravind	Star Suvarna	₹1,00,00,000/-	June 25, 2018	September 21, 2018	Original format and clock format (until the second guaranteed sum)
India (Kannada)	ಕನ್ನಡದ ಕೋಟ್ಯಾಧಿಪತಿ Kannadada Kotyadhipati	Puneeth Rajkumar†	Colors Kannada	₹1,00,00,000/-	June 22, 2019	November 17, 2019	Original format and clock format (until the second guaranteed sum)
India (Marathi)	कोण होईल मराठी करोडपती Kon Hoeel Marathi Crorepati	Sachin Khedekar	ETV Marathi	₹1,00,00,000/-	May 6, 2013	August 29, 2013	Original format and clock format (until the second guaranteed sum)
India (Marathi)	कोण होईल मराठी करोडपती Kon Hoeel Marathi Crorepati	Sachin Khedekar	ETV Marathi	₹2,00,00,000/-	January 13, 2014	May 13, 2014	16-question format and clock format (until the second guaranteed sum)
India (Marathi)	कोण होईल मराठी करोडपती Kon Hoeel Marathi Crorepati	Swapnil Joshi	ETV Marathi	₹3,00,00,000/-	October 3, 2016	January 4, 2017	16-question format and clock format (until the second guaranteed sum)
India (Marathi)	कोण होणार करोडपती Kon Honaar Crorepati	Nagraj Manjule	Sony Marathi	₹1,00,00,000/-	May 27, 2019	August 15, 2019	Original format and clock format (until the second guaranteed sum)
India (Marathi)	कोण होणार करोडपती Kon Honaar Crorepati	Sachin Khedekar	Sony Marathi	₹1,00,00,000/-	July 12, 2021	August 13, 2022	Original format and clock format (until the second guaranteed sum)
India (Marathi)	कोण होणार करोडपती Kon Honaar Crorepati	Sachin Khedekar	Sony Marathi	₹2,00,00,000/-	May 29, 2023	August 12, 2023	16-question format and clock format (until the second guaranteed sum)
India (Marathi)	कोण होणार करोडपती Kon Honaar Crorepati	Madhuri Dixit	Sony Marathi	₹1,00,00,000/-	October 12, 2026		Original format and clock format (until the second guaranteed sum)
India (Bengali)	কে হবে বাংলার কোটিপতি Ke Hobe Banglar Kotipoti	Sourav Ganguly	Mahuaa Bangla	₹1,00,00,000/-	June 6, 2011	August 12, 2011	Original format and clock format (until the second guaranteed sum)
India (Bengali)	কে হবে বাংলার কোটিপতি Ke Hobe Banglar Kotipoti	Prosenjit Chatterjee	Colors Bangla	₹1,00,00,000/-	July 16, 2018	August 31, 2018	Original format and clock format (until the second guaranteed sum)
India (Bhojpuri)	के बनी क्रोरेपती Ke Bani Crorepati	Shatrughan Sinha	Mahuaa TV	₹1,00,00,000/-	June 6, 2011	August 12, 2011	Original format and clock format (until the second guaranteed sum)
India (Kashmiri)	کُس بانِ كٲشُر کرورپٔتی; Kus Bani Kashur Karorpaet	Rayees Mohiuddin	DD Kashir	₹1,00,00,000/-	April 29, 2019	July 6, 2019	Original format and clock format (until the second guaranteed sum)
Indonesia	Who Wants to Be a Millionaire?	Tantowi Yahya	RCTI	Rp. 1,000,000,000	August 4, 2001	July 30, 2006	Original format
Indonesia	Super Milyarder 3 Milyar	Dian Sastrowardoyo	ANTV	Rp. 3,000,000,000	September 24, 2006	January 21, 2007	Original format (with 4th lifeline since the first guaranteed sum)
Indonesia	Who Wants to Be a Millionaire? Hot Seat	Ferdi Hasan	RCTI	Rp. 250,000,000	September 13, 2010	September 18, 2010	Hot Seat format
Indonesia	Who Wants to Be a Millionaire? Hot Seat	Ferdi Hasan	RCTI	Rp. 500,000,000	September 19, 2010	October 31, 2010	Hot Seat format
Ireland	Who Wants to Be a Millionaire?	Gay Byrne†	RTÉ One	IE£1,000,000	October 17, 2000	December 31, 2001	Original format
Ireland	Who Wants to Be a Millionaire?	Gay Byrne†	RTÉ One	€1,000,000	January 2, 2002	March 29, 2002	Original format
Israel	?מי רוצה להיות מיליונר; Mi rotseh lehiyot milyoner?	Yoram Arbel	Channel 2	₪1,000,000	November 18, 1999	October 31, 2003	Original format
Israel	?מי רוצה להיות מיליונר; Mi rotseh lehiyot milyoner?	Yoram Arbel	Channel 10	₪1,000,000	May 3, 2006	April 30, 2007	Original format (with 4th lifeline since the first guaranteed sum)
Israel	?מי רוצה להיות מיליונר; Mi rotseh lehiyot milyoner?	Erez Tal	Channel 12	₪1,000,000	July 16, 2020	April 16, 2021	Original format and Clock format (until the first guaranteed sum)
Italy	Chi vuol essere miliardario?	Gerry Scotti	Canale 5	Lit. 1,000,000,000	May 22, 2000	December 1, 2001	Original format
Italy	Chi vuol essere milionario?	Gerry Scotti	Canale 5	€1,000,000	January 13, 2002	June 6, 2010	Original format
Italy	Chi vuol essere milionario?	Gerry Scotti	Canale 5	€1,000,000	September 6, 2010	July 29, 2011	Risk format
Italy	Chi vuol essere milionario?	Gerry Scotti	Canale 5	€1,000,000	December 7, 2018	November 5, 2020	Original format (with second guaranteed sum chosen by player and 4 lifelines)
Italy	Chi vuol essere milionario? – Il Torneo	Gerry Scotti	Canale 5	€1,000,000	December 7, 2025		Tournament format
Italy	Chi vuol essere milionario? – Edizione Straordinaria	Gerry Scotti	Canale 5	€1,000,000	December 15, 2008	March 29, 2009	Hot Seat format
Ivory Coast	Qui veut gagner des millions?	Bamba Bakary	RTI	30,000,000 F CFA	December 21, 2011	July 20, 2012	Original format
Ivory Coast	Qui veut gagner des millions?	Yves Zogbo Jr.	RTI	30,000,000 F CFA	July 13, 2013	September 7, 2013	Original format
Japan	クイズ$ミリオネア; Kuizu $ Mirionea	Monta Mino†	Fuji TV	¥10,000,000 (original) ¥20,000,000 (2001 New Year Special) ¥30,000,000 (2002 New Year Special) ¥1,000,000 (Junior edition) ¥500,000 (Junior edition)	April 20, 2000	April 4, 2009	Original format
Japan	クイズ$ミリオネア; Kuizu $ Mirionea	Monta Mino†	Fuji TV	¥10,000,000 (original) ¥20,000,000 (2001 New Year Special) ¥30,000,000 (2002 New Year Special) ¥1,000,000 (Junior edition) ¥500,000 (Junior edition)	September 15, 2009	December 7, 2010	Original format and Clock format
Japan	クイズ$ミリオネア; Kuizu $ Mirionea	Monta Mino†	Fuji TV	¥10,000,000 (original) ¥20,000,000 (2001 New Year Special) ¥30,000,000 (2002 New Year Special) ¥1,000,000 (Junior edition) ¥500,000 (Junior edition)	March 31, 2011	January 2, 2013	Original format
Japan	クイズ$ミリオネア; Kuizu $ Mirionea	Kazunari Ninomiya	Fuji TV	¥10,000,000	January 1, 2026		12-question format
Kazakhstan (Kazakh)	Миллион кiмге бұйырады? Million kımge būiyrady?	Eskender Sergebayev	El Arna (Habar-2)	5,000,000₸	September 2004	September 30, 2006	Original format
Kazakhstan (Kazakh)	Миллион кiмге бұйырады? Million kımge būiyrady?	Dosymbek Otegaliev	Habar	10,000,000₸	September 15, 2018	July 27, 2019	Original format
Kazakhstan (Russian)	Кто возьмёт миллион? Kto vozmyot million?	Evgeny Zhumanov	KTK	5,000,000₸	May 19, 2001	June 26, 2004	Original format
Kazakhstan (Russian)	Кто возьмёт миллион? Kto vozmyot million?	Serik Akishev	El Arna (Habar-2)	5,000,000₸	September 2004	September 29, 2006	Original format
Kazakhstan (Russian)	Кто возьмёт миллион? Kto vozmyot million?	Serik Akishev	Habar	10,000,000₸	September 16, 2017	June 27, 2018	Original format
Kenya	Who Wants to Be a Millionaire?	Fayyaz Qureshi	KTN	Ksh. 5,000,000/=	October 13, 2000	2000s	Original format
Kyrgyzstan	Миллионер болгуң келеби? Millioner bolgung kelebi?	Erkin Ryskulbekov	KTRK	3,000,000 som	September 4, 2016	September 11, 2016	Original format
Kyrgyzstan	Миллионер болгуң келеби? Millioner bolgung kelebi?	Erkin Ryskulbekov	KTRK	1,000,000 som	October 2, 2016	November 25, 2018	Original format
Latvia	Gribi būt miljonārs?	Mārtiņš Ķibilds†	TV3	10,000 Ls.	September 4, 2002	May 28, 2003	Original format
Latvia	Gribi būt miljonārs?	Mārtiņš Ķibilds†	TV3	20,000 Ls.	September 3, 2003	May 26, 2005	Original format
Latvia	Gribi būt miljonārs?	Mārtiņš Ķibilds†	TV3	50,000 Ls.	September 7, 2005	May 30, 2007	Original format
Latvia	Gribi būt miljonārs?	Ģirts Līcis	TV3	50,000 Ls.	September 12, 2007	2008	Original format
Lithuania	Kas laimės milijoną?	Henrikas Vaitiekūnas	TV3	1,000,000 Lt.	May 16, 2002	April 25, 2003	Original format
Lithuania	Kas laimės milijoną?	Vytautas Kernagis†	TV3	1,000,000 Lt.	May 1, 2003	August 18, 2005	Original format
Malaysia (Malay)	Who Wants to Be a Millionaire?	Jalaluddin Hassan	NTV7	RM 1,000,000	June 5, 2000	November 2001	Original format
Malaysia (Mandarin)	百万富翁; Bai Wan Fu Weng	Victor Gu	NTV7	RM 1,000,000	November 2001	May 2003	Original format
Mauritius	Qui veut gagner des millions ?	Sandra Mayotte	MBC	Rs. 1,000,000	August 11, 2018	August 3, 2019	Original format
Mexico	¿Quién quiere ser millonario?	Pablo Latapí Ortega	TV Azteca	MX$3,000,000	March 23, 2010	June 8, 2010	Original format
Mexico	¿Quién quiere ser millonario?	Pablo Latapí Ortega	TV Azteca	MX$1,500,000	February 25, 2012	June 23, 2012	Original format
Mexico	¿Quién quiere ser millonario?	Enrique de la Madrid Cordero	TV Azteca	MX$1,000,000	September 27, 2026		Original format
Moldova	Vrei să fii milionar?	Dan Negru	Prime TV	1,000,000 lei	December 4, 2011	July 29, 2012	Original format
Mongolia	Монголын саятан Mongolyn sayatan	D. Enkhbayar	EduTV	20,000,000₮	February 21, 2024	July 10, 2024	Original format
Mongolia	Монголын саятан Mongolyn sayatan	G. Zandankhuu	EduTV	20,000,000₮	December 10, 2025		Original format
Nepal	को बन्छ करोडपति ? Ko Banchha Crorepati ?	Rajesh Hamal	AP1 TV	Rs. 1,00,00,000/-	February 2, 2019	June 3, 2019	Original format
Netherlands	(Lotto) Weekend Miljonairs (Note: Sponsor on title since December 31, 1999)	Robert ten Brink	SBS 6	Fl. 1,000,000	February 6, 1999	December 31, 2001	Original format
Netherlands	(Lotto) Weekend Miljonairs	Robert ten Brink	SBS 6	€1,000,000	January 5, 2002	February 18, 2006	Original format
Netherlands	(Lotto) Weekend Miljonairs	Robert ten Brink	RTL 4	€1,000,000	March 4, 2006	May 24, 2008	Original format
Netherlands	Lotto Weekend Miljonairs	Jeroen van der Boom	SBS 6	€1,000,000	March 12, 2011	October 15, 2011	12-question format and Clock format (until the second guaranteed sum) (with 4th lifeline since the second guaranteed sum)
Netherlands	BankGiro Miljonairs	Robert ten Brink	RTL 4	€1,000,000	May 25, 2019	March 6, 2021	Original format (Phone-a-Friend lifeline shortened from 30 to 25 seconds)
Netherlands	VriendenLoterij Miljonairs	Robert ten Brink	RTL 4	€1,000,000	August 28, 2021	March 15, 2025	Original format (Phone-a-Friend lifeline shortened from 30 to 25 seconds)
New Zealand	Who Wants to Be a Millionaire? New Zealand	Mike Hosking	TV One	NZ$1,000,000	September 9, 2008	November 11, 2008	Original format (with 4th lifeline since the second guaranteed sum)
Nigeria	Who Wants to Be a Millionaire?	Frank Edoho	NTA, Silverbird TV	₦5,000,000	October 8, 2004	2006	Original format
Nigeria	Who Wants to Be a Millionaire?	Frank Edoho	NTA, Silverbird TV	₦10,000,000	2007	June 25, 2017	Original format
Nigeria	Who Wants to Be a Millionaire?	Frank Edoho	Africa Magic, Silverbird TV	₦20,000,000	March 20, 2022	April 8, 2023	Original format
North Macedonia	Кој сака да биде милионер? Koj saka da bide milioner?	Sašo Macanovski Trendo	A1	3,000,000 DEN	March 25, 2004	July 2006	Original format
North Macedonia	Кој сака да биде милионер? Koj saka da bide milioner?	Sašo Macanovski Trendo	A1	4,000,000 DEN	December 16, 2007	November 29, 2009	Original format (with 4 lifelines)
Norway	Vil du bli millionær?	Arve Juritzen	TV2	NKr 2,000,000	January 10, 2000	2000	Original format
Norway	Vil du bli millionær?	Frithjof Wilborn	TV2	NKr 2,000,000	2000	2007	Original format
Norway	Vil du bli millionær?	Sarah Natasha Melbye	TV2	NKr 1,000,000	January 2008	2009	Original format
Norway	Vil du bli millionær? Hot Seat	Sarah Natasha Melbye	TV2	NKr 1,000,000	January 4, 2010	October 21, 2011	Hot Seat format
Pakistan	Kya Aap Banaingay Crorepati?	Moin Akhtar†	ARY Digital	Rs. 1,00,00,000/-	2002	2004	Original format
Panama	¿Quién quiere ser millonario?	Atenógenes Rodríguez	Telemetro	US$100,000	July 9, 2009	December 29, 2011	Original format
Peru	¿Quién quiere ser millonario?	Guido Lombardi	Red Global	S/ 1,000,000	July 1, 2001	March 1, 2002	Original format
Philippines	Who Wants to Be a Millionaire?	Christopher de Leon	IBC	₱1,000,000	November 13, 2000	March 1, 2001	Original format
Philippines	Who Wants to Be a Millionaire?	Christopher de Leon	IBC	₱2,000,000	March 5, 2001	December 14, 2002	Original format
Philippines	Who Wants to Be a Millionaire?	Vic Sotto	TV5	₱2,000,000	May 23, 2009	October 2, 2010	Original format
Philippines	Who Wants to Be a Millionaire?	Vic Sotto	TV5	₱2,000,000	May 15, 2011	February 26, 2012	Original format (with 4th lifeline after the second guaranteed sum)
Philippines	Who Wants to Be a Millionaire?	Vic Sotto	TV5	₱2,000,000	July 1, 2012	October 7, 2012	Original format (with 4th lifeline after the second guaranteed sum)
Philippines	Who Wants to Be a Millionaire?	Vic Sotto	TV5	₱2,000,000	September 15, 2013	January 11, 2015	Original format or Risk format (contestant's choice)
Philippines	Who Wants to Be a Millionaire?	Vic Sotto	TV5	₱2,000,000	May 10, 2015	November 22, 2015	12-question format or Risk format (contestant's choice)
Poland	Milionerzy	Hubert Urbański	TVN	1,000,000 zł	September 3, 1999	January 26, 2003	Original format
Poland	Milionerzy	Hubert Urbański	TVN	1,000,000 zł	January 19, 2008	December 19, 2010	12-question format or Risk format (contestant's choice)
Poland	Milionerzy	Hubert Urbański	TVN	1,000,000 zł 2,000,000 zł (2 Million Zloty Week specials)	February 9, 2017	July 5, 2025	12-question format (with 4th lifeline after the second guaranteed sum)
Poland	Milionerzy	Hubert Urbański	Polsat	1,000,000 zł	September 1, 2025		12-question format
Portugal	Quem quer ser milionário?	Carlos Cruz	RTP 1	50,000,000$00	January 24, 2000	May 2000	Original format
Portugal	Quem quer ser milionário?	Maria Elisa Domingues	RTP 1	50,000,000$00	September 2000	January 2001	Original format
Portugal	Quem quer ser milionário?	Diogo Infante	RTP 1	50,000,000$00	January 2001	April 2001	Original format
Portugal	Quem quer ser milionário?	Jorge Gabriel	RTP 1	€250,000	September 29, 2003	January 11, 2005	Original format
Portugal	Quem quer ser milionário?	Jorge Gabriel	RTP 1	€250,000	January 21, 2008	June 6, 2008	Original format
Portugal	Quem quer ser milionário?	Manuela Moura Guedes	RTP 1	€100,000	September 23, 2013	April 24, 2015	Original format
Portugal	Quem quer ser milionário? Alta Pressão	José Carlos Malato	RTP 1	€100,000	July 5, 2010	September 16, 2011	Hot Seat format
Portugal	Quem quer ser milionário? Alta Pressão	José Carlos Malato	RTP 1	€100,000	April 28, 2015	December 30, 2015	Hot Seat format
Portugal	Quem quer ser milionário? Alta Pressão	Filomena Cautela	RTP 1	€50,000	June 20, 2020	November 28, 2020	Hot Seat format (with 3-question Fastest Finger First and lifelines available)
Romania	Vrei să fii miliardar?	Virgil Ianțu	Prima TV	1,000,000,000 lei	September 8, 2000	July 1, 2003	Original format
Romania	Vrei să fii milionar?	Virgil Ianțu	Kanal D	1,000,000 lei	August 24, 2011	November 29, 2012	Original format (with 4th lifeline after the second guaranteed sum)
Romania	Vrei să fii milionar?	Virgil Ianțu	Prima TV	1,000,000 lei	March 22, 2014	June 15, 2014	Original format (with 4th lifeline after the second guaranteed sum)
Romania	Vrei să fii milionar?	Teo Trandafir	Kanal D	1,000,000 lei	November 5, 2018	July 22, 2019	Original format (with 4th lifeline after the second guaranteed sum)
Russia	О, счастливчик! O, schastlivchik!	Dimitry Dibrov	NTV	1,000,000 ₽	October 1, 1999	January 27, 2001	Original format
Russia	Кто хочет стать миллионером? Kto khochet stat' millionerom?	Maxim Galkin; Mariya Kiselyova (December 23, 2002)	Channel One (formerly ORT)	1,000,000 ₽	February 19, 2001	August 13, 2005	Original format
Russia	Кто хочет стать миллионером? Kto khochet stat' millionerom?	Maxim Galkin; Mariya Kiselyova (December 23, 2002)	Channel One (formerly ORT)	3,000,000 ₽	September 17, 2005	October 14, 2006	Original format
Russia	Кто хочет стать миллионером? Kto khochet stat' millionerom?	Maxim Galkin; Mariya Kiselyova (December 23, 2002)	Channel One (formerly ORT)	3,000,000 ₽	October 21, 2006	April 26, 2008	Original format (with 4th lifeline Three Wise Men which was not used in Celebrity edition)
Russia	Кто хочет стать миллионером? Kto khochet stat' millionerom?	Maxim Galkin; Mariya Kiselyova (December 23, 2002)	Channel One (formerly ORT)	3,000,000 ₽	May 2, 2008	September 13, 2008	Original format (with one guaranteed sum on the 5th question)
Russia	Кто хочет стать миллионером? Kto khochet stat' millionerom?	Dimitry Dibrov	Channel One (formerly ORT)	3,000,000 ₽	December 27, 2008	August 14, 2010	Original format
Russia	Кто хочет стать миллионером? Kto khochet stat' millionerom?	Dimitry Dibrov	Channel One (formerly ORT)	3,000,000 ₽	September 4, 2010	August 27, 2011	Original format and Extra-high-risk format (with 4 lifelines and one guaranteed sum chosen by a player)
Russia	Кто хочет стать миллионером? Kto khochet stat' millionerom?	Dimitry Dibrov	Channel One (formerly ORT)	3,000,000 ₽	September 10, 2011	November 24, 2018	Extra-high-risk format (with 4 lifelines and one guaranteed sum chosen by a player)
Russia	Кто хочет стать миллионером? Kto khochet stat' millionerom?	Dimitry Dibrov	Channel One (formerly ORT)	3,000,000 ₽	December 1, 2018	June 18, 2022	Extra-high-risk format (with 5 lifelines (Note: 4 of the 5 different lifelines are available to be used.) and one guaranteed sum chosen by a player)
Serbia Montenegro	Želite li da postanete milioner?	Ivan Zeljković	BKTV	3,000,000 DIN	May 6, 2002	April 24, 2006	Original format
Serbia Montenegro	Želite li da postanete milioner?	Ivan Zeljković	B92	5,000,000 DIN	April 9, 2007	June 22, 2009	Original format (with 4th lifeline after the first guaranteed sum)
Serbia Montenegro	Želite li da postanete milioner?	Ivan Zeljković	Prva (formerly Fox)	5,000,000 DIN	March 23, 2010	July 9, 2011	Original format (with 4th lifeline after the first guaranteed sum)
Serbia Montenegro	Želite li da postanete milioner?	Ivan Zeljković	Nova S	5,000,000 DIN	September 19, 2022		Original format
Singapore (English)	Who Wants to Be a Millionaire?	Mark Van Cuylenburg	Channel 5	S$1,000,000	April 19, 2000	2004	Original format
Singapore (Mandarin)	百万大赢家; Bai wan da ying jia	Cao (Timothy) Qitai	Channel 8	S$1,000,000	August 16, 2000	2004	Original format
Slovakia	Milionár	Martin Nikodým	Markíza	1,000,000 Sk.	September 15, 2000	September 1, 2001	Original format
Slovakia	Milionár	Martin Nikodým	Markíza	5,000,000 Sk.	September 4, 2001	October 4, 2006	Original format
Slovakia	Milionár	Martin Nikodým	Jednotka	5,000,000 Sk.	April 12, 2007	June 28, 2007	Original format (with 4th lifeline since the first guaranteed sum)
Slovakia	Milionár	Iveta Malachovská	Jednotka	10,000,000 Sk.	October 4, 2007	March 26, 2008	Original format (with 4th lifeline since the first guaranteed sum)
Slovenia	Lepo je biti milijonar – Kviz z Jonasom	Jonas Žnidaršič	POP TV	10,000,000 SIT	March 6, 2000	December 29, 2002	Original format
Slovenia	Lepo je biti milijonar	Boštjan Romih	POP TV	10,000,000 SIT	February 22, 2003	June 8, 2003	Original format
Slovenia	Lepo je biti milijonar	Boštjan Romih	POP TV	15,000,000 SIT	September 6, 2003	June 10, 2005	Original format
Slovenia	Milijonar	Jonas Žnidaršič	TV SLO 1	€100,000	March 1, 2007	January 1, 2008	Original format
Slovenia	Milijonar	Slavko Bobovnik	Planet TV	€100,000	March 4, 2019	February 11, 2020	Original format (As of 2019 with 4 lifelines)
Slovenia	Milijonar	Jure Godler	Planet TV	€100,000	March 2, 2020		Original format (As of 2019 with 4 lifelines)
South Africa (English)	Who Wants to Be a Millionaire?	Jeremy Maggs	M-Net	R 1,000,000	November 7, 1999	2005	Original format
South Africa (Afrikaans)	Wie Word 'n Miljoenêr?	Rian van Heerden	kykNET	R 1,000,000	October 27, 2021		Original format (with 4 lifelines and second guaranteed sum chosen by player)
South Korea	퀴즈쇼 밀리어네어; Kwijeusyo Millieoneeo	Kim Kap-soo	tvN	₩500,000,000	May 26, 2013	June 2, 2013	Original format and Clock format (presumably until the second guaranteed sum)
Spain	¿Quiere ser millonario? 50 por 15	Carlos Sobera	Telecinco	50,000,000 Pts.	April 17, 1999	January 5, 2002	Original format
Spain	¿Quién quiere ser millonario?	Carlos Sobera	Antena 3	1,000,000 €	July 25, 2005	May 16, 2008	Original format
Spain	¿Quién quiere ser millonario?	Antonio Garrido	Antena 3	1,000,000 €	May 18, 2009	July 10, 2009	Original format
Spain	¿Quién quiere ser millonario?	Juanra Bonet	Antena 3	1,000,000 €	January 22, 2020	May 21, 2022	Original format
Spain	¿Quién quiere ser millonario?	Juanra Bonet	laSexta	1,000,000 €	April 2, 2024	June 3, 2025	Original format
Spain	El millonario	Nuria Roca	laSexta	100,000 €	February 15, 2012	July 31, 2012	Hot Seat format
Sri Lanka (Sinhala)	ඔබද ලක්ෂපති මමද ලක්ෂපති Obada Lakshapathi Mamada Lakshapathi	Lucky Dias	Sirasa TV	Rs. 2,000,000	September 18, 2010	August 30, 2011	Original format
Sri Lanka (Sinhala)	ඔබද ලක්ෂපති මමද ලක්ෂපති Obada Lakshapathi Mamada Lakshapathi	Chandana Suriyabandara	Sirasa TV	Rs. 2,000,000	September 5, 2011	October 1, 2017	Original format
Sri Lanka (Sinhala)	ඔබද ලක්ෂපති මමද ලක්ෂපති Obada Lakshapathi Mamada Lakshapathi	Chandana Suriyabandara	Sirasa TV	Rs. 2,000,000	September 22, 2018	June 6, 2021	Original format with 4th lifeline after second guaranteed sum
Sri Lanka (Sinhala)	සිරස ලක්ෂපති Sirasa Lakshapathi	Chandana Suriyabandara	Sirasa TV	Rs. 3,000,000	August 7, 2021	December 29, 2024	Original format with 4th lifeline after second guaranteed sum
Sri Lanka (Sinhala)	සිරස ලක්ෂපති Sirasa Lakshapathi	Upul Shantha Sannasgala	Sirasa TV	Rs. 3,000,000	August 1, 2026		Original format with 4th lifeline after second guaranteed sum
Sri Lanka (Tamil)	உங்களில் யார் மகா இலட்சாதிபதி Ungalil Yaar Maha Latchathipathi	R.P. Abarna Suthan	Shakthi TV	Rs. 2,000,000	May 2011	2011	Original format
Sri Lanka (Tamil)	உங்களில் யார் மகா இலட்சாதிபதி Ungalil Yaar Maha Latchathipathi	Balendran Kandeeban	Shakthi TV	Rs. 2,000,000	May 12, 2012	July 2015	Original format
Sri Lanka (Tamil)	உங்களில் யார் மகா இலட்சாதிபதி Ungalil Yaar Maha Latchathipathi	TBA	Shakthi TV	Rs. 3,000,000	TBA		Original format
Sri Lanka (English)	Who Wants to Be a Millionaire?	Riyaz Shah Jahan	TV 1	Rs. 2,000,000	May 12, 2012	May 6, 2013	Original format
Sweden	Vem vill bli miljonär?	Bengt Magnusson	TV4	SKr 10,000,000	January 21, 2000	April 8, 2001	Original format
Sweden	Vem vill bli miljonär?	Bengt Magnusson	TV4	SKr 3,000,000	October 7, 2001	June 13, 2003	Original format
Sweden	Postkodmiljonären	Rickard Sjöberg	TV4	SKr 1,000,000	August 26, 2005	May 31, 2008	Original format
Sweden	Postkodmiljonären	Rickard Sjöberg	TV4	SKr 1,000,000	August 29, 2008		Original format or Risk format (contestant's choice)
Sweden	Postkodmiljonären – Heta stolen	Rickard Sjöberg	TV4	SKr 1,000,000	December 20, 2011	October 31, 2020	Hot Seat format
Switzerland	Wer wird Millionär?	René Rindlisbacher	TV3	Fr. 1,000,000	March 27, 2000	December 3, 2001	Original format
Switzerland	Wer wird Millionär?	Claudio Zuccolini	3+	Fr. 1,000,000	November 29, 2011	December 13, 2011	Original format or Risk format (contestant's choice)
Thailand	ใครจะได้รางวัลล้าน; Krai Ja Dai Rangwan Lan	TBA	TBA	฿2,000,000	TBA	TBA	Original format
Turkey	Kim 500 Milyar İster?	Kenan Işık†	Show TV	500,000,000,000 TL	March 7, 2000	June 18, 2002	Original format
Turkey	Kim 500 Milyar İster?	Kenan Işık†	Kanal D	500,000,000,000 TL	September 17, 2002	June 2004	Original format
Turkey	Kim 500 Bin İster?	Kenan Işık†	Show TV	500,000 YTL	December 5, 2005	2006	Original format
Turkey	Kim 500 Bin İster?	Haluk Bilginer	Show TV	500,000 YTL	April 24, 2007	June 3, 2007	Original format
Turkey	Kim Bir Milyon İster?	Kenan Işık†	Star TV	1,000,000 YTL	February 1, 2008	2008	16-question format (with 4th lifeline since the second guaranteed sum)
Turkey	Kim Milyoner Olmak İster?	Kenan Işık†	ATV	1,000,000 TL	August 2, 2011	May 7, 2014	12-question format and Clock format (until the second guaranteed sum) (with 4th lifeline since the second guaranteed sum)
Turkey	Kim Milyoner Olmak İster?	Various celebrities (Note: To temporarily stand in for Kenan Işık who was ill.)	ATV	1,000,000 TL	May 10, 2014	July 27, 2014	12-question format and Clock format (until the second guaranteed sum) (with 4th lifeline since the second guaranteed sum)
Turkey	Kim Milyoner Olmak İster?	Selçuk Yöntem	ATV	1,000,000 TL	September 15, 2014	January 28, 2017	12-question format and Clock format (until the second guaranteed sum) (with 4th lifeline since the second guaranteed sum)
Turkey	Kim Milyoner Olmak İster?	Murat Yıldırım	ATV	1,000,000 TL	February 7, 2017	June 29, 2019	12-question format and Clock format (until the second guaranteed sum) (with 4th lifeline since the second guaranteed sum)
Turkey	Kim Milyoner Olmak İster?	Kenan İmirzalıoğlu	ATV	1,000,000 TL	October 5, 2019	September 10, 2023	12-question format and Clock format (until the second guaranteed sum) (with 4th lifeline since the second guaranteed sum)
Turkey	Kim Milyoner Olmak İster?	Kenan İmirzalıoğlu	ATV	5,000,000 TL	September 17, 2023	September 6, 2024	13-question format and Clock format (until the second guaranteed sum) (with 4th lifeline since the second guaranteed sum)
Turkey	Kim Milyoner Olmak İster?	Oktay Kaynarca	ATV	5,000,000 TL	September 8, 2024	October 11, 2026	13-question format and Clock format (until the second guaranteed sum) (with 4th lifeline since the second guaranteed sum)
Turkey	Kim Milyoner Olmak İster?	Cem Öğretir	ATV	10,000,000 TL	October 18, 2026		Original format and Clock format (until the second guaranteed sum) (with 4th lifeline since the second guaranteed sum)
Uganda	Who Wants to Be a Millionaire?	Alan Kasujja	NTV	USh 25,000,000/=	January 31, 2011	February 20, 2012	Original format
Ukraine	Хто хоче стати мільйонером? Перший мільйон Khto khoche staty mil'yonerom? Pershyy milyon	Danylo Yanevskyy	1+1	₴1,000,000	November 10, 2000	June 22, 2002	Original format
Ukraine	Хто хоче стати мільйонером? Перший мільйон Khto khoche staty mil'yonerom? Pershyy milyon	Anatoly Borsiuk	1+1	₴1,000,000	April 12, 2003	December 26, 2003	Original format
Ukraine	Хто хоче стати мільйонером? Перший мільйон Khto khoche staty mil'yonerom? Pershyy milyon	Ostap Stupka	1+1	₴1,000,000	January 15, 2005	December 17, 2005	Original format
Ukraine	Мільйонер – Гаряче крісло Mil'yoner – Garyache krislo	Volodymyr Zelenskyy	Inter	₴1,000,000	February 15, 2011	August 13, 2011	Hot Seat format
Ukraine	Хто хоче стати мільйонером? Khto khoche staty mil'yonerom?	Stanislav Boklan	ICTV	₴1,000,000	November 29, 2021	December 29, 2021	Original format (with 4 lifelines)
Ukraine	Хто хоче стати мільйонером? Khto khoche staty mil'yonerom?	Stanislav Boklan	ICTV2	₴1,000,000	October 21, 2024		Original format (with 4 lifelines)
United Kingdom (original)	Who Wants to Be a Millionaire?	Chris Tarrant	ITV	£1,000,000	September 4, 1998	July 28, 2007	Original format
United Kingdom (original)	Who Wants to Be a Millionaire?	Chris Tarrant	ITV	£1,000,000	August 18, 2007	June 8, 2010	12-question format
United Kingdom (original)	Who Wants to Be a Millionaire?	Chris Tarrant	ITV	£1,000,000	August 3, 2010	February 11, 2014	12-question format and Clock format (until the second guaranteed sum) (with 4th lifeline available after the second guaranteed sum)
United Kingdom (original)	Who Wants to Be a Millionaire?	Jeremy Clarkson	ITV	£1,000,000	May 5, 2018		Original format (second guaranteed sum chosen by player, 4th lifeline: Ask the Host)
United Kingdom (original)	Millionaire Hot Seat	Jeremy Clarkson	ITV	£1,000,000	January 6, 2026		Hot Seat format
United States	Who Wants to Be a Millionaire	Regis Philbin†	ABC	US$1,000,000	August 16, 1999	June 27, 2002	Original format
United States	Who Wants to Be a Millionaire	Regis Philbin†	ABC	US$1,000,000	August 9, 2009	August 23, 2009	Original format and Clock format
United States	Who Wants to Be a Millionaire	Meredith Vieira	Television syndication	US$1,000,000	September 16, 2002	June 27, 2008	Original format
United States	Who Wants to Be a Millionaire	Meredith Vieira	Television syndication	US$1,000,000	September 8, 2008	June 25, 2010	Original format and Clock format
United States	Who Wants to Be a Millionaire	Meredith Vieira	Television syndication	US$1,000,000	September 13, 2010	May 31, 2013	Shuffle format
United States	Who Wants to Be a Millionaire	Cedric the Entertainer	Television syndication	US$1,000,000	September 2, 2013	May 31, 2014	Shuffle format
United States	Who Wants to Be a Millionaire	Terry Crews	Television syndication	US$1,000,000	September 8, 2014	May 29, 2015	Shuffle format
United States	Who Wants to Be a Millionaire	Chris Harrison	Television syndication	US$1,000,000	September 14, 2015	May 31, 2019	Original format with 14 questions
United States	Who Wants to Be a Millionaire	Jimmy Kimmel	ABC	US$1,000,000	April 8, 2020	March 21, 2021	Original format (Ask the Host replaces Ask the Audience) (after 10th question, any lifeline is available to be switched for a lifeline similar to Plus One)
United States	Who Wants to Be a Millionaire	Jimmy Kimmel	ABC	US$1,000,000	July 10, 2024		Original format (with 4 lifelines)
United States	Who Wants to Be a Super Millionaire	Regis Philbin†	ABC	US$10,000,000	February 22, 2004	May 25, 2004	Original format (Three Wise Men and Double Dip available after 10th question)
Uruguay	¿Quién quiere ser millonario?	Andrés Tulipano	Teledoce	US$40,000 (Note: Due to the volatility of the Uruguayan peso at the time, the original version had its top prize in US dollars, which would then be converted to Uruguayan pesos at the end of the contestant's run.)	July 2001	November 2001	Original format
Uruguay	¿Quién quiere ser millonario?	Orlando Petinatti	Canal 10	UY$1,500,000	April 29, 2021	January 10, 2022	Original format
Uruguay	¿Quién quiere ser millonario?	Orlando Petinatti	Canal 10	UY$2,000,000	January 13, 2022	June 30, 2022	Original format
Uzbekistan	Kim millioner boʻlmoqchi?	Rihsitilla Abdullaev	Zoʻr TV	100,000,000 soʻm 500,000,000 soʻm (2026 New Year's special)	October 12, 2025	May 24, 2026	Original format
Uzbekistan	Kim millioner boʻlmoqchi?	Rihsitilla Abdullaev	Zoʻr TV	500,000,000 soʻm	October 11, 2026		Original format
Venezuela	¿Quién quiere ser millonario?	Eladio Lárez	RCTV	100,000,000 Bs.	August 23, 2000	2005	Original format
Venezuela	¿Quién quiere ser millonario?	Eladio Lárez	RCTV	200,000,000 Bs.	2005	2007	Original format
Venezuela	¿Quién quiere ser millonario?	Eladio Lárez	RCTV	200,000 Bs.F	2008	January 20, 2010	Original format
Venezuela	¿Quién quiere ser millonario?	Eladio Lárez	Televen	250,000 Bs.F	May 8, 2011	November 27, 2011	Original format
Venezuela	¿Quién quiere ser millonario?	Eladio Lárez	Televen	300,000 Bs.F	March 4, 2012	March 30, 2014	Original format or Risk format (contestant's choice)
Venezuela	¿Quién quiere ser millonario?	Eladio Lárez	Televen	400,000 Bs.F	2014	2015	Original format or Risk format (contestant's choice)
Venezuela	¿Quién quiere ser millonario?	Eladio Lárez	Televen	500,000 Bs.F	2015	February 21, 2016	Original format or Risk format (contestant's choice)
Venezuela	¿Quién quiere ser millonario?	Eladio Lárez	Televen	2,000,000 Bs.F	March 20, 2016	2016/2017 (Note: The date of when the last episode is unclear, but most likely late 2016, but there is a possibility of it having aired until as late as April 2, 2017, as a special edition of the show for employees of a financial organisation was produced and put on YouTube, with all contestants becoming top prize winners (of a reduced prize of 80,000 Bs.F), but this was likely not part of the official show itself.)	Original format or Risk format (contestant's choice)
Vietnam	Ai là triệu phú	Lại Văn Sâm (2005–2017); Phan Đăng (2018–2020); Đinh Tiến Dũng (2021–2025); Quốc Khánh (2026–present)	VTV3	50,000,000₫	January 4, 2005	October 11, 2005	Original format (with 4th lifeline since the first guaranteed sum)
Vietnam	Ai là triệu phú	Lại Văn Sâm (2005–2017); Phan Đăng (2018–2020); Đinh Tiến Dũng (2021–2025); Quốc Khánh (2026–present)	VTV3	100,000,000₫	October 18, 2005	February 13, 2007	Original format (with 4th lifeline since the first guaranteed sum)
Vietnam	Ai là triệu phú	Lại Văn Sâm (2005–2017); Phan Đăng (2018–2020); Đinh Tiến Dũng (2021–2025); Quốc Khánh (2026–present)	VTV3	120,000,000₫	February 20, 2007	June 12, 2012	Original format (with 4th lifeline since the first guaranteed sum)
Vietnam	Ai là triệu phú	Lại Văn Sâm (2005–2017); Phan Đăng (2018–2020); Đinh Tiến Dũng (2021–2025); Quốc Khánh (2026–present)	VTV3	150,000,000₫	June 19, 2012	December 28, 2021	Original format (with 4th lifeline since the first guaranteed sum)
Vietnam	Ai là triệu phú	Lại Văn Sâm (2005–2017); Phan Đăng (2018–2020); Đinh Tiến Dũng (2021–2025); Quốc Khánh (2026–present)	VTV3	250,000,000₫	January 4, 2022	March 24, 2026	Original format (with 4th lifeline since the first guaranteed sum)
Vietnam	Ai là triệu phú	Lại Văn Sâm (2005–2017); Phan Đăng (2018–2020); Đinh Tiến Dũng (2021–2025); Quốc Khánh (2026–present)	VTV3	500,000,000₫	March 31, 2026		Original format (with 4th lifeline since the first guaranteed sum)
Vietnam	Ai Là Triệu Phú – Ghế nóng	Lại Văn Sâm	VTV3	120,000,000₫	September 7, 2010	June 28, 2011	Hot Seat format

=== Unlicensed versions ===
Countries/regions	Title	Host	Network	Top prize	Premiere	Finale	Last used format
Brazil	Show do Milhão as part of Programa Silvio Santos since 2024 revival	Silvio Santos†	SBT	R$1,000,000	November 7, 1999	October 23, 2003	16-question format
Brazil	Show do Milhão as part of Programa Silvio Santos since 2024 revival	Silvio Santos†	SBT	R$1,000,000	July 8, 2009	September 9, 2009	24-question format
Brazil	Show do Milhão as part of Programa Silvio Santos since 2024 revival	Celso Portiolli	SBT	R$1,000,000	September 3, 2021	November 26, 2021	16-question format
Brazil	Show do Milhão as part of Programa Silvio Santos since 2024 revival	Patricia Abravanel	SBT	R$1,000,000	September 8, 2024		17-question format
Iran	برنده باش; Barande Bash	Mohammad Reza Golzar	IRIB TV3	Rls. 2,000,000,000	August 19, 2018	September 7, 2018	Original format
Iran	برنده باش; Barande Bash	Mohammad Reza Golzar	IRIB TV3	200,000,000 points (Note: From September 2018 onwards, the show had its top prize in points (امتیاز), which would be the value of ten rials and therefore be the actual prize value divided by ten, similar to the "points" reckoning used in Vietnam for much of its existence. This practice is common in Iranian daily life, but is more commonly known as "toman" (تومن).)	September 27, 2018	January 31, 2019	Original format
Iran	برنده باش; Barande Bash	Mohammad Reza Golzar	IRIB TV3	100,000,000 points	February 1, 2019	April 19, 2019	Original format
Iraq	الملياردير; Almilyarder	George Kordahi	Alrabiaa	ID 1,000,000,000	March 11, 2024		16-question format (with one free lifeline; the other two require the contestant to move down one step on the money tree)
Iraq (Kurdistan)	Milyonêr	Ciwan Haco	Kanal4	ID 100,000,000	November 2009	2010	Original format (with 4 guaranteed sums)
Iraq (Kurdistan)	Milyonêr	Ciwan Haco	Kanal4	ID 100,000,000	2010	2011	Original format
Iraq (Kurdistan)	Milyonêr	Ciwan Haco	Kanal4	ID 100,000,000	2011	2012	Clock format
Mongolia	Саятан болохыг хүсвэл Sayatan Bolohyg Husvel	?	MNB	1,000,000₮	2000s	2000s	Original format
Mongolia	Монголын саятан тв-шоу Mongolin Sayatan TV-Show	R. Nyambayar	Edutainment TV	1,000,000₮	July 2010	2010	12-question format and Clock format
Mongolia	Монголын саятан тв-шоу Mongolin Sayatan TV-Show	R. Nyambayar	Edutainment TV	5,000,000₮	2011	2012	Original format
Russia	Кто хочет стать миллионером? Kto khochet stat' millionerom? (Note: Since 2023, the show airs without Sony Pictures Television's involvement in the production.)	Yulianna Karaulova; Dmitry Dibrov (2025, three episodes)	Channel One	3,000,000 ₽	April 29, 2023		Original format
Taiwan	超級大富翁; Chao Ji Da Fu Weng	Hsieh Chen-wu	TTV	NT$1,000,000	May 29, 2000	February 18, 2006	Clock format
Thailand	เกมเศรษฐี Kemsresthi	Traiphop Limpapath	Channel 3	฿1,000,000	March 4, 2000	March 28, 2004	16-question format
Thailand	เกมเศรษฐี Kemsresthi	Traiphop Limpapath	iTV	฿1,000,000	April 1, 2004	February 4, 2007	12-question format
Thailand	เกมเศรษฐี Kemsresthi	Traiphop Limpapath	TITV	฿1,000,000	February 10, 2007	January 14, 2008	12-question format
Vietnam	Rồng vàng	Chánh Tín† (2003–2004); Thành Lộc (2004–2005); Hữu Luân (2006–2007)	HTV7	28,000,000₫	May 25, 2003	May 23, 2004	16-question format
Vietnam	Rồng vàng	Chánh Tín† (2003–2004); Thành Lộc (2004–2005); Hữu Luân (2006–2007)	HTV7	50,000,000₫	May 30, 2004	2006	16-question format
Vietnam	Rồng vàng	Chánh Tín† (2003–2004); Thành Lộc (2004–2005); Hữu Luân (2006–2007)	HTV7	50,000,000₫	July 2006	June 10, 2007	Original format

== "Is that your final answer?" catchphrases ==
The Millionaire franchise's catchphrase is "Is that your final answer?" (more commonly said by some versions' hosts as "Final answer?", "Chris' Final Answer" or simply "Final?"), a question derived from a rule requirement that the players must clearly indicate their choices before being made official (since the nature of the game allows the player to think aloud about the options before committing to an answer). As a side effect, once a final answer has been given, it is locked in and cannot be changed. Many parodies of the game show capitalised on this phrase. However, not every version has taken over such a catchphrase so that the answer is stated rather informally in that case.

Players can prevent the host from asking this question, by stating themselves "final answer" or some variant after they declare their choice.

Another hallmark of the show is using dramatic pauses before the host acknowledges whether or not the answer was correct. Occasionally, the host will only announce if the answer is correct after the commercial break.

Country	Host	Question	Translation
Arab Maghreb	Rachid El Ouali	اللي ليها ليها؟ Elli leeha leeha?	What did happen to happen?
(Arab League) Arab World	George Kurdahi	جواب نهائي؟ Jawab Nihaeyy?	Final answer?
(Arab League) Arab World	Maysa Maghrebi	نثبت؟ Nthabbet?	Fix it?
Argentina	Julián Weich	¿Respuesta final?	Final answer?
Argentina	Santiago del Moro	¿Ultima palabra?	Final word?
Armenia	Avet Barseghyan	Սա Ձեր վերջնակա՞ն պատասխանն է: Sa Dzer verjnaka'n pataskhann'e?	Is that your final answer?
Australia	Eddie McGuire	Lock it in?	—N/a
Austria	Rainhard Fendrich; Barbara Stöckl; Armin Assinger	Ist das deine endgültige Antwort?	Is this your Final Answer?
Azerbaijan	İlhamiyyə Rzayeva; Azər Axşam; DJ Fateh	Son qərarınızdır?	Is this your final decision?
Belgium	Walter Grootaers; Staf Coppens	Is dit je definitieve antwoord?	Is this your definitive answer?
Belgium	Alain Simons	C'est votre dernier mot?	Is that your final word?
Brazil	Luciano Huck	Por sua conta e risco, resposta final?	At your own risk, final answer?
Bulgaria	Niki Kanchev; Mihail Bilalov	Това ли е твоят окончателен отговор? Tova li e tvoyat okonchatelen otgovor?	Is that your final answer?
Chile	Don Francisco; Sergio Lagos; Diana Bolocco	¿Respuesta definitiva?	Definitive answer?
China	Li Fan	确定吗？ Quèdìng ma?	Are you sure?
Colombia	Paulo Laserna Phillips	¿Última palabra?	Final word?
Costa Rica	Ignacio Santos Pasamontes	¿Respuesta definitiva?	Definitive answer?
Croatia	Tarik Filipović	Je li to Vaš konačni odgovor?	Is that your final answer?
Czech Republic	Vladimír Čech; Martin Preiss; Ondřej Hejma; Roman Šmucler; Marek Vašut	Je to vaše poslední slovo?	Is that your final word?
Denmark	Peter Kær; Jes Dorph Petersen; Hans Pilgaard; Christian Degn	Er det dit endelige svar?	Is that your final answer?
Ecuador	Alfonso Espinosa de los Monteros; Estéfani Espín	¿Última palabra?	Final word?
El Salvador	Willie Maldonado	¿Respuesta definitiva?	Definitive answer?
Finland	Lasse Lehtinen; Ville Klinga; Jaajo Linnonmaa; Antti Holma	Lukitaanko vastaus?	Shall we lock the answer?
France	Jean-Pierre Foucault; Camille Combal	C'est votre dernier mot ?	Is that your final word?
Germany	Günther Jauch	Ist das deine endgültige Antwort?	Is that your final answer?
Hong Kong	Kenneth Chan; Stephen Chan	最後答案? Zeoi hau daap ngon?	Final answer?
Hungary	István Vágó; Sándor Fabry; Sándor Friderikusz; Gábor Gundel Takács	Végleges? Megjelöljük?	Final? Shall we mark it?
Iceland	Þorsteinn J Jónas R. Jónsson	Loka svar?	Final answer?
India	Amitabh Bachchan	लॉक किया जाए? Lock kiya jaye?	Lock it?
India	Amitabh Bachchan	Confirm?	—N/a
India	Shah Rukh Khan	फ्रिज़ करें? Freeze kare?	Freeze it?
India	Nagarjuna; Chiranjeevi Jr NTR	లాక్ చేసేయనా? Lock cheseyana?	Shall I lock it?
India	Suriya; Prakash Raj; Arvind Swamy	லாக் பநல்லம? Lock panallama?	Shall we lock it?
India	Suresh Gopi	ലോക്ക് ചെയ്യാം? Lock cheyyam?	Can we lock it?
India	Puneeth Rajkumar; Ramesh Aravind	ಲಾಕ್ ಮಾಡೋದ? Lock maadoda?	Can it be locked?
Indonesia	Tantowi Yahya	Yakin? Seratus Persen?	Are You Sure? Hundred Percent?
Iran	Mohammad Reza Golzar	انتخاب آخر شماست؟ Entekhabe akhare shomast?	Is that your last choice?
Israel	Yoram Arbel; Erez Tal	?סופי; Sofi?	Finally?
Italy	Gerry Scotti	È la tua risposta definitiva? L'accendiamo?	Is that your definitive answer? Shall we light it up?
Japan	Monta Mino	ファイナルアンサー？ Fainaruansā?	Final answer?
Malaysia	Jalaluddin Hassan	Jawapan muktamad?	Definitive answer?
Mexico	Pablo Latapí Ortega	¿Decisión absoluta?	Absolute decision?
New Zealand	Mike Hosking	Lock it in?	—N/a
Norway	Arve Juritzen	Er endelig svar avgitt?	Has the final answer been given?
Pakistan	Moin Akhter	فائنل انسر؟ Final answer?	Final answer?
Panama	Atenógenes Rodríguez	¿Respuesta definitiva?	Definitive answer?
Philippines	Christopher de Leon; Vic Sotto	(No direct translation. Uses the English catchphrase.)	—N/a
Poland	Hubert Urbański	Ostatecznie? Definitywnie? Czy to jest twoja ostateczna odpowiedź?	Finally? Definitely? Is that your final answer?
Portugal	Carlos Cruz; Maria Elisa; Diogo Infante; Jorge Gabriel; José Carlos Malato; Filomena Cautela	Quer que bloqueie?	Shall I lock it?
Romania	Virgil Ianțu; Teo Trandafir	Răspuns final?	Final answer?
Russia	Dmitry Dibrov	Это ваш окончательный ответ? Eto vash okonchatel'nyy otvet?	Is this your final answer?
Russia	Maxim Galkin	Это ваш окончательный ответ? Eto vash okonchatel'nyy otvet?	Is this your final answer?
Slovakia	Martin Nikodým; Iveta Malachovská	Označujeme? Je to vaše posledné rozhodnutie?	Mark it? Is that your final decision?
Slovenia	Jonas Žnidaršič; Boštjan Romih; Slavko Bobovnik; Jure Godler	Je to vaš zadnji odgovor?	Is that your final answer?
Serbia	Ivan Zeljković	Да ли је то Ваш коначан одговор?/Da li je to Vaš konačan odgovor? Да обележимо?/Da obeležimo?	Is that your final answer? Shall we mark it?
Spain	Carlos Sobera; Antonio Garrido; Juanra Bonet	¿La marcamos? ¿Respuesta final?	Shall we mark it? Final answer?
Sri Lanka	Lucky Dias; Chandana Suriyabandara	අවසන් පිළිතුර? Awason pilitura?	Final answer?
Sweden	Bengt Magnusson; Rickard Sjöberg	Är det ditt slutgiltiga svar?	Is that your final answer?
Switzerland	René Rindlisbacher; Claudio Zuccolini	Definitiv?	Definitive?
Turkey	Kenan Işık; Haluk Bilginer; Selçuk Yöntem; Murat Yıldırım; Kenan İmirzalioğlu; Oktay Kaynarca Cem Öğretir	Son kararınız mı?	Your final decision?
Uruguay	Orlando Petinatti	¿Es esta tu respuesta final?	Is this your final answer?
Venezuela	Eladio Lárez	¿Respuesta definitiva?	Definitive answer?
Vietnam	Lại Văn Sâm	Phương án cuối cùng của bạn là?	Your final option is?
Vietnam	Lại Văn Sâm; Phan Đăng; Đinh Tiến Dũng	Câu trả lời cuối cùng của bạn là?	Your final answer is?
Vietnam	Quốc Khánh	Đáp án cuối cùng của bạn là?	Your final answer is?
Vietnam	Quốc Khánh	Sự lựa chọn cuối cùng của bạn là?	Your final choice is?
