= Pilgaard =

Pilgaard is a surname. Notable people with the surname include:

- Claus Pilgaard (born 1965), Danish musician and entertainer
- Hans Pilgaard (born 1963), Danish journalist and television host
- Petter Pilgaard (born 1980), Norwegian television celebrity
- Ulf Pilgaard (born 1940), Danish actor
