= Estéfani Espín =

Ecuadorian television presenter

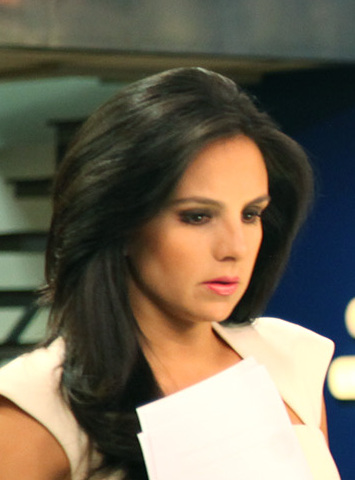
- Born: 22 June 1985 (age 40); Quito
- Occupation: TV presenter

Estéfani Espín (born 22 June 1985) is an Ecuadorian TV presenter.

== Life ==
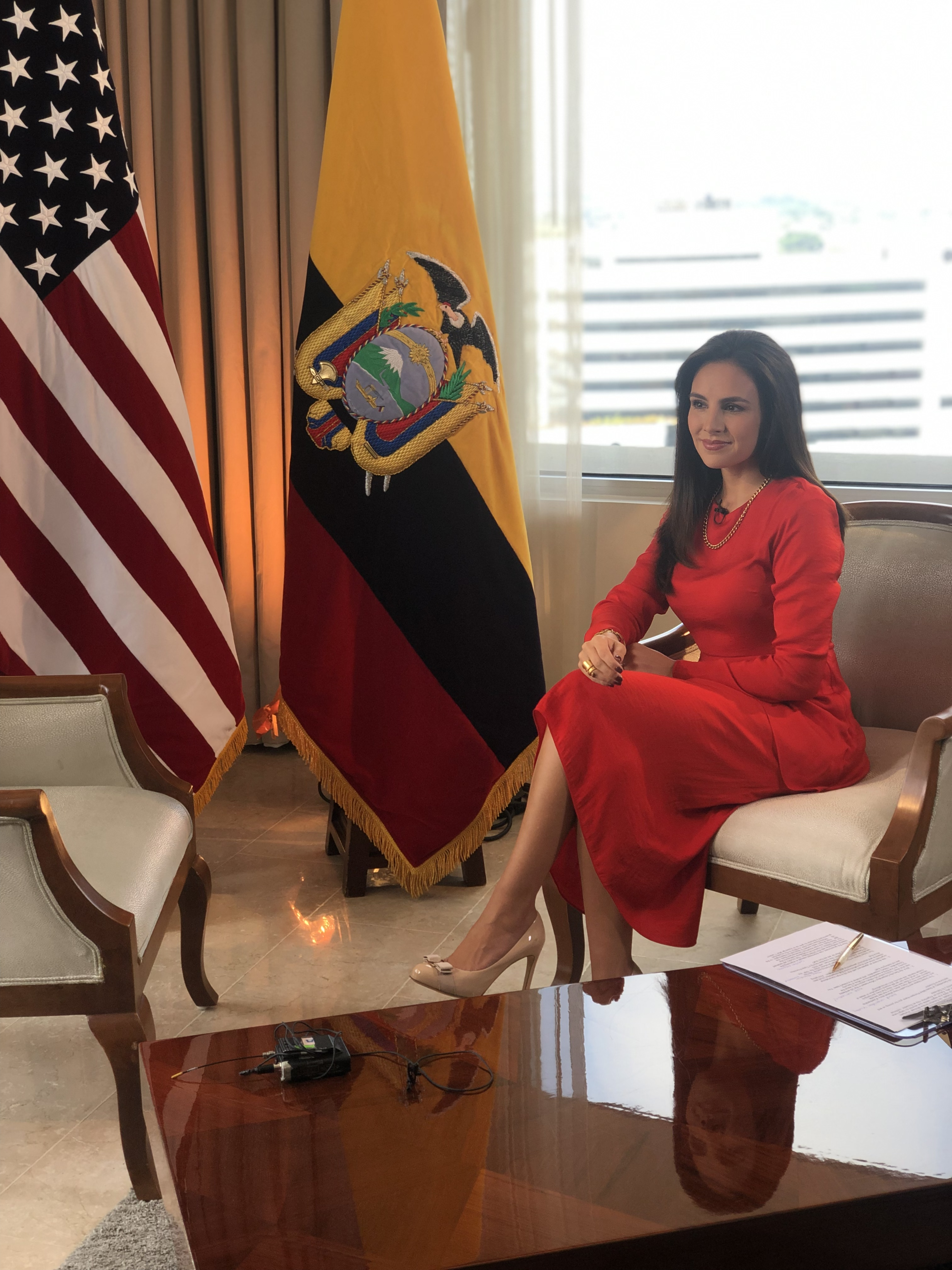

Espín was born in Quito to successful parents. She studied journalism and business management in universities in Quito, Ecuador and in Nebraska, USA.

Espin started work interviewing on CNN Radio before becoming a news anchor on CNN's Spanish network in the USA. In 2008 she returned to Ecuador to work at Ecuavisa. She appeared on the midday program Televistazo and shortly afterwards she left Contacto Directo with Alfredo Pinoargote, after the departure of Carlos Vera. Later it became part of Contacto al Amanecer.

In 2012 she premiered on Ecuavisa "Who Wants to be a Millionaire? High Tension" which is a modified version of the original Who wants to be millionaire? The original presenter was veteran TV news anchor Alfonso Espinosa de los Monteros.

== Private life ==
She has two sons and a daughter with her husband.
