= Öğretir =

Öğretir is a Turkish surname. Notable people with the surname include:

- Berkay Ömer Öğretir (born 1998), Turkish swimmer
- Cem Öğretir (born 1973), Turkish TV presenter and reporter
- Seda Öğretir (born 1980), Turkish TV journalist
