= Jorge Antunes =

Jorge Antunes may refer to:

- Jorge Antunes (actor), Angolan actor
- Jorge Antunes (composer) (born 1942), Brazilian composer
