= Nada Al Shaibani =

Bahraini broadcaster

- ندى الشيباني
- Born: Riffa, Bahrain
- Education: Qatar University
- Occupations: broadcaster and TV presenter

Nada Al Shaibani (Arabic: ندى الشيباني), is a Bahraini broadcaster and media personality living in Qatar. She chairs the Women's Committee of the Gulf Cooperation Council Media Committee and presents Sabah Al Khair (“Good Morning”), the morning show on Abu Dhabi TV.

== Early life ==
Al Shaibani was born in Riffa. She spent her childhood in Bahrain but moved to Qatar to study Food and Nutrition Sciences at Qatar University. She grew up in a sporting family, including a mother who played handball and a father who served as a referee.

She faced significant obstacles early on in her a career as a sportscaster, remarking once that “I struggled as a Gulf woman in media, and in the sports field in particular.” She credits the support of her parents as a major factor in her success.

== Career ==
Al Shaibani's media career in Qatar began as producer of children's programs from 2001 to 2005, including the show Khazaz, winner of a Gold Award for the best such show in the Arab world.

She worked in the media department of the government's Qatar General Authority of Youth from 2005 to 2007. This was followed by a stint from 2008 to 2011 at Al Kass Sports Channels in 2008, where she contributed news bulletins and hosted shows on women's sports, most notably Noon (a series profiling female athletes) and Al-Dahwaniyah (daily coverage of important regional events such as the 19th Arabian Gulf Cup held in Oman in 2009). In 2011, she moved to Dubai One, where she co-hosted the variety show Swalifna Hilwa with other former anchors and broadcasters such as Maryam Amin, Marwan Saleh, and Ibrahim Al Badi.

She moved at the beginning of 2012 to Sky News Arabia, returning to sport coverage. In December 2013, she headed to Abu Dhabi TV to host the daily variety show Sabah Al Dar. In 2013, she won the Sheikha Fatima bint Mubarak Award for Women Athletes in the Outstanding Media Figure category. Al Shaibani was appointed in 2014 to the Media and Promotion Committee of that award, presented by Fatima bint Mubarak Al Ketbi.

In 2015, she was appointed head of the women's committee of the Gulf Media Sports Federation. She made her acting debut in 2017, appearing in a bit part in the series Qalbi Maei, in which she played a self-referential role as an ambitious media broadcasting trainee presenting a weekly show alongside Mayssa Maghrebi.
