= Hsieh Chen-wu =

Taiwanese lawyer and television personality

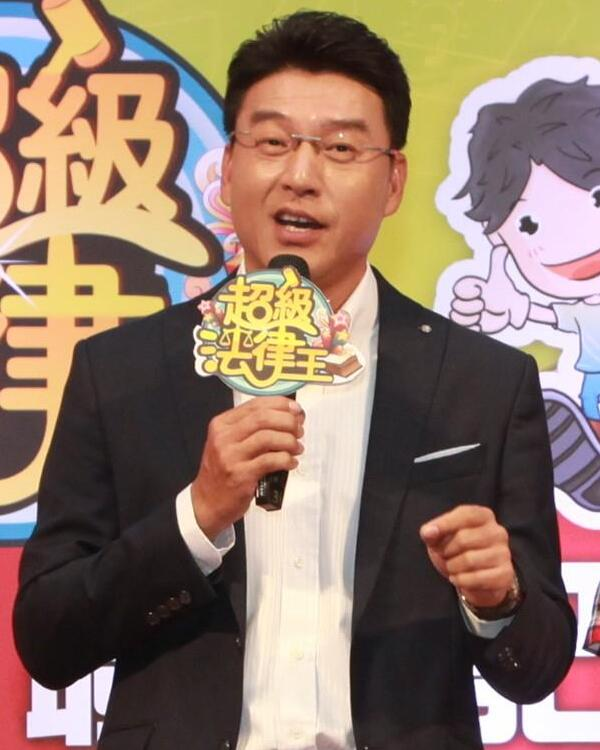
- Hsieh Chen-wu hosting Chao ji da fu weng
- Born: 21 October 1963 (age 61); Keelung, Taiwan
- Education: National Chengchi University (LLB)
- Years active: 2000─present

Chinese name
- Traditional Chinese: 謝震武
Transcriptions

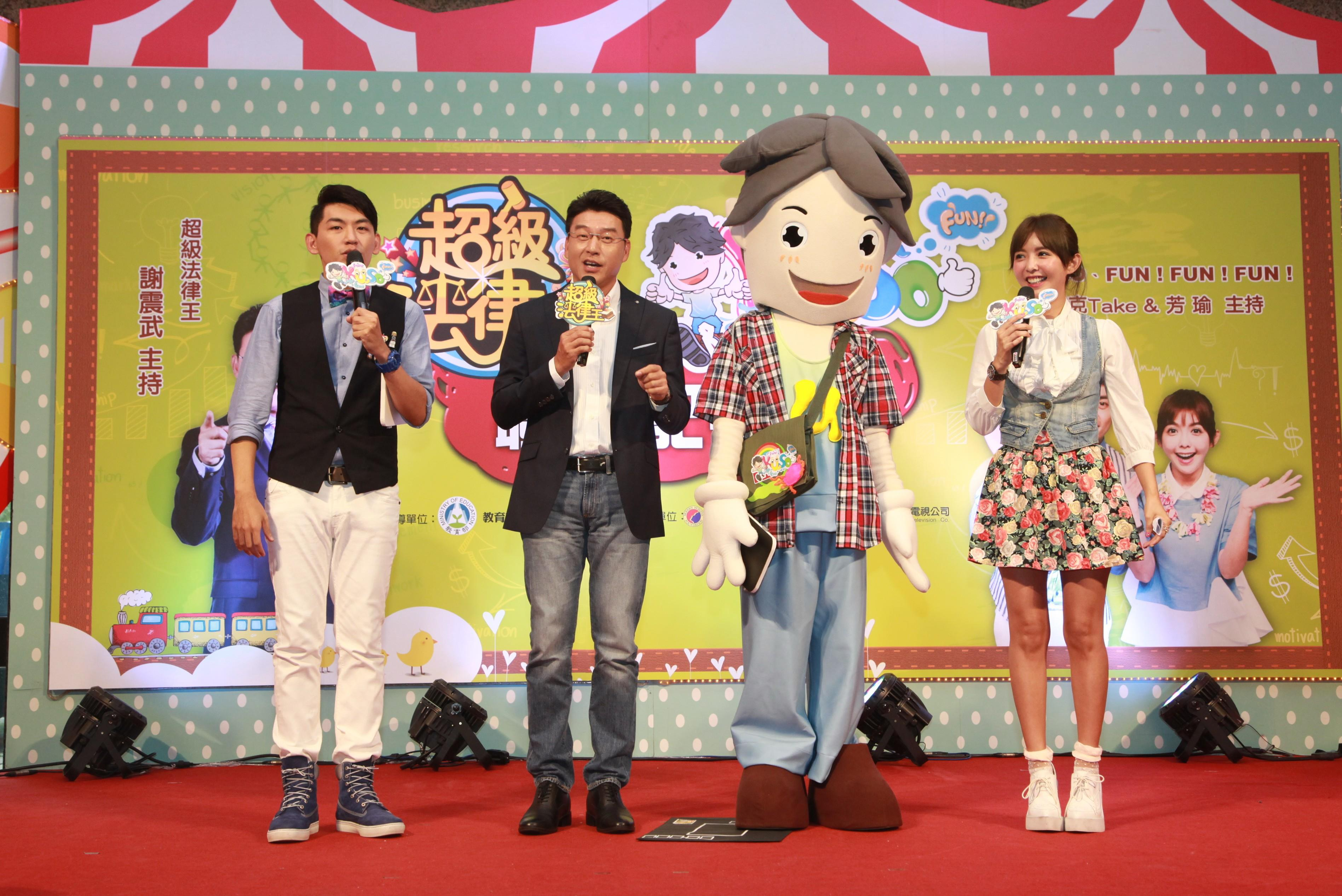
「超級法律王」主持人合影

Hsieh Chen-wu (Chinese: 謝震武; pinyin: Xiè Zhènwǔ; born 21 October 1963) is a Taiwanese lawyer and TV presenter. He worked for many television stations, such as TTV, CTS, FTV, PTV, SET, STAR Chinese Channel, CTi Variety, Much TV and Momo TV. He is most famous for hosting the Chao ji da fu weng game show.
