= Kim zəngin olmaq istəyir? Milyonların Şousu =

Azerbaijani quiz show

- Also known as: Milyonçu. Dövlətli olmaq istərdinmi?
- Genre: Quiz show
- Presented by: Ilhamiyya Rzayeva; Azar Akhsham; DJ Fateh (2021–)
- Country of origin: Azerbaijan
- No. of seasons: 6

Original release
- Network: Lider TV (2002-2007); İctimai Television (2021-present)
- Release: 9 August 2002 – present

Kim zəngin olmaq istəyir? Milyonların Şousu is the Azerbaijani version of Who Wants to Be a Millionaire?. It started broadcasting on 3 October 2021 and is presented by DJ Fateh. The first Azerbaijani language version started 9 August 2002 and was known as Milyonçu. Dövlətli olmaq istərdinmi? and presented by Ilhamiyya Rzayeva and Azar Akhsham. Milyonçu. Dövlətli olmaq istərdinmi? was broadcast for five years before it went off air.

== Lifelines ==
- 50:50 (50 50-yə): If the contestant uses this lifeline, the host will ask the computer to remove two of the wrong answers, leaving one right answer and one wrong answer. This gives the contestant a 50% chance of choosing the correct answer.
- Phone a Friend (Dosta zəng): If the contestant uses this lifeline, they are allowed to call one of three pre-arranged friends, who all must provide their phone numbers in advance. The host usually begins by talking to the contestant's friend and introducing them to the viewers. After the introduction, the host will hand the phone call over to the contestant, who then gets thirty seconds to ask and hope for a reply from their friend.
- Ask the Audience (Zalın köməyi): If any contestant uses this lifeline, the host will repeat the question to the audience. The studio audience gets ten seconds to answer the question. Audience members use touchpads to give the answer they believe to be correct. After the audience has made their selections, their choices will be displayed to the contestant in percentages in bar-graph format and also shown on the monitor screens of the host, contestant and TV viewers.

== Money Tree ==
In the 2021 version the first five question values follow the denominations of Azerbaijani banknotes (10, 20, 50, 100 and 200 manat), and the top prize is 100,000 manat rather than one million; according to presenter DJ Fateh, all prize values are agreed with the format owner, Sony Pictures Television.

Payout structure
Question number	Question value	
Question number	2002–2007 (Note: In 2007, the manat was redenominated at a ratio of 1 new manat for 5,000 old manat.)	2021–present
15	100,000,000m (20,000₼)	100,000₼
14	50,000,000m (10,000₼)	25,000₼
13	25,000,000m (5,000₼)	16,000₼
12	12,500,000m (2,500₼)	8,000₼
11	6,400,000m (1,280₼)	5,000₼
10	3,200,000m (640₼)	3,000₼
9	1,600,000m (320₼)	1,500₼
8	800,000m (160₼)	750₼
7	400,000m (80₼)	400₼
6	200,000m (40₼)	300₼
5	100,000m (20₼)	200₼
4	50,000m (10₼)	100₼
3	30,000m (6₼)	50₼
2	20,000m (4₼)	20₼
1	10,000m (2₼)	10₼
Milestone Custom milestone Top prize
