= Barbara Stöckl =

Austrian television and radio presenter (born 1963)

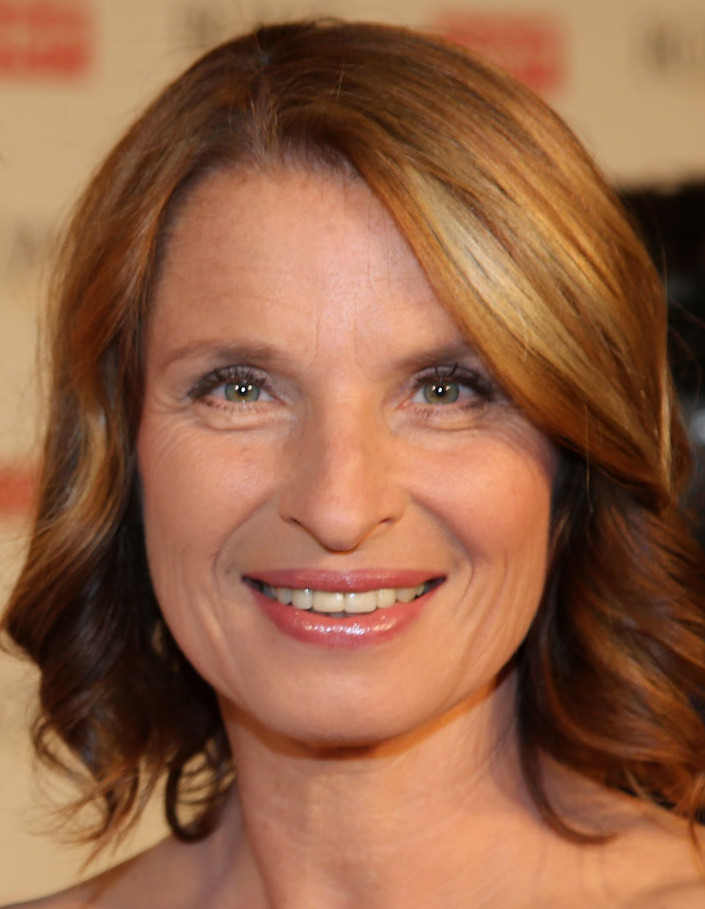
Stöckl in 2015

Barbara Stöckl (born 2 April 1963 in Vienna) is an Austrian television and radio presenter.

After attending a sports school, she studied Engineering Mathematics at the Vienna University of Technology. During her studies, she worked as an assistant director for the ORF youth program "Okay", which she hosted from 1985. Between 1988 and 1993, she presented the youth magazine "colon" in German ZDF. Stöckl commented for ORF at the 1990 Eurovision Song Contest in Zagreb. She began hosting Die Millionenshow - the Austrian version of the globally popular British game show Who Wants to Be a Millionaire? - in May 2000, becoming the first female presenter of the Millionaire format worldwide. After her departure in 2002, Armin Assinger took over as the show's presenter.

Together with director Peter Nagy, Stöckl operates the production company KIWI TV.

She has three sisters and one brother, one of them is TV personality Claudia Stöckl.
