= Kas laimės milijoną? =

- Logo
- Created by: David Briggs; Steven Knight; Mike Whitehill
- Presented by: Henrikas Vaitiekūnas; Vytautas Kernagis
- Country of origin: Lithuania

Original release
- Network: TV3
- Release: 16 May 2002 – 18 August 2005

Kas laimės milijoną? (English translation: Who will win the million?) is a Lithuanian quiz show based on the original British format of Who Wants to Be a Millionaire?. The show was originally hosted by Henrikas Vaitiekūnas, who was later replaced by Vytautas Kernagis in 2003. The main goal of the game was to win 1 million litas by answering 15 multiple-choice questions correctly. There were three lifelines - 50:50 (vienas iš dviejų), Phone a Friend (skambutis draugui) and Ask the Audience (salės pagalba). Kas laimės milijoną? was broadcast from 16 May 2002 to 18 August 2005. It was shown on the TV3. When a contestant got the fifth question correct, they left with at least 1,000 litai. When a contestant got the tenth question correct, they left with at least 32,000 litai. The biggest winner is Rita Nikolskienė, who won 64,000 litai on 9 May 2003.

== Payout structure ==
Question number	Question value
Question number	(Yellow zones are the guaranteed levels)
1	100 Lt (€29)
2	200 Lt (€58)
3	300 Lt (€87)
4	500 Lt (€145)
5	1,000 Lt (€290)
6	2,000 Lt (€579)
7	4,000 Lt (€1,158)
8	8,000 Lt (€2,317)
9	16,000 Lt (€4,634)
10	32,000 Lt (€9,268)
11	64,000 Lt (€18,536)
12	125,000 Lt (€36,203)
13	250,000 Lt (€72,405)
14	500,000 Lt (€144,810)
15	1,000,000 Lt (€289,620)
