= Vrei să fii milionar? =

Romanian game show

- Genre: Quiz show
- Presented by: Virgil Ianţu; Teo Trandafir
- Country of origin: Romania

Production
- Running time: 60 minutes

Original release
- Network: Kanal D
- Release: 24 August 2011 – 29 November 2012
- Network: Prima TV
- Release: 22 March – 15 June 2014
- Network: Kanal D
- Release: 5 November 2018 – 22 July 2019

Vrei să fii milionar? (lit. 'Do you want to be a millionaire?') is a Romanian game show based on the original British format of Who Wants to Be a Millionaire?. The show is hosted by Virgil Ianţu (2011–2012, 2014) and Teo Trandafir (2018–2019). The main goal of the game is to win 1 million Romanian lei by answering 15 multiple-choice questions correctly. There are four lifelines - 50/50, phone a friend, ask the audience and change the question (available only from the 11th question). Vrei să fii milionar? is shown on Kanal D (2011–2012, 2018–2019) and Prima TV (2014).

== Money tree ==
From 2011

- 1. question • 100 lei
- 2. question • 200 lei
- 3. question • 300 lei
- 4. question • 500 lei
- 5. question • 1,000 lei (guaranteed sum)
- 6. question • 1,500 lei
- 7. question • 3,000 lei
- 8. question • 5,000 lei
- 9. question • 7,500 lei
- 10. question • 15,000 lei (guaranteed sum)
- 11. question • 25,000 lei
- 12. question • 50,000 lei
- 13. question • 100,000 lei
- 14. question • 250,000 lei
- 15. question • 1,000,000 lei

== Old version ==
Vrei să fii miliardar?
- Genre: Quiz show
- Presented by: Virgil Ianţu
- Country of origin: Romania

Production
- Running time: 30 minutes

Original release
- Network: Prima TV
- Release: 8 September 2000 – 1 July 2003

An older version of Vrei să fii milionar? was broadcast at Prima TV. The title was Vrei să fii miliardar? (English translation: Do you want to be a billionaire?). Its host was also Virgil Ianţu. The biggest prize was 1 billion old lei (100,000 new lei).

During its first season, the Bulgarian version of the show was taped in the Romanian studio.
