= First million =

- Also known as: Who Wants to Be a Millionaire? – First Million
- Ukrainian: Перший мільйон
- Genre: Quiz show
- Directed by: Iryna Ionova (2000—2006); Pavlo Ovechkin (2003)
- Presented by: Danylo Yanevskyi (2000—2002); Anatoliy Borsyuk (2003); Ostap Stupka (2005—2006)
- Country of origin: Ukraine
- Original language: Ukrainan
- No. of seasons: 5

Production
- Producers: Volodymyr Oseledchyk; Alexander Rodnyansky

First million (also known as Who Wants to Be a Millionaire? – First Million) is a Ukrainian version of Who Wants to Be a Millionaire? It was broadcast on 1+1 TV channel from November 10, 2000, to January 20, 2006. It was hosted by: Danylo Yanevsky (from November 10, 2000, to June 22, 2002), Anatoliy Borsiuk (from April 12 to December 26, 2003), and Ostap Stupka (from January 15, 2005, to January 20, 2006). In 2021, it was revived on the ICTV channel.

== History ==
The first Ukrainian version of the game was broadcast on 1+1 TV channel on November 10, 2000, hosted by Danylo Yanevsky. In 2003, Anatoliy Borsiuk took over, and in 2005–2006, Ostap Stupka was the host. During the 5 1/2 years of the game's broadcast, only two participants answered the fifteenth question: Serhiy Karabinsky (June 6, 2003) and Svyatoslav Vakarchuk (January 22, 2005).

On October 13, 2021, it became known that the show would be restarted on ICTV. On November 9, 2021, ICTV revealed the name of the new host – People's Artist of Ukraine Stanislav Boklan.

== Rules ==
=== Telephone registration ===
To participate in the game, participants have to register by phone, where they need to give the correct answer to the contest question. From those candidates who select the correct answer, a computer database of potential players is created. Then, using a random number generator, the computer selects a group of 100 individuals each month for the next stage of selection.

=== Telegame ===
For each game, 10 players are selected (+2 reserve, in case any of the main participants are unable to attend the game).

=== Selection stage ===
At the beginning of the game, one out of 10 players is chosen, specifically the one who completes a simple intellectual task the fastest. They then get the opportunity to answer the main 15 questions and compete for a cash prize for the correct answers. During the game, each of the 10 players has several chances to become the primary player, as the qualifying round under certain conditions can be repeated. Since 2021, the qualifying round has been canceled.

=== Main stage ===
Following this, the main stage of the game begins, during which the host sequentially presents a series (up to 15) of questions to the player, each with four possible answers. For every correct answer, the player receives a specific cash prize. The level of question difficulty gradually increases; however, each subsequent question "costs" more than the previous one and is presented only after answering the previous question. Thus, the prize amount increases from 50 to 1,000,000 hryvnias.

Question	Winnings in 2000-2002 and in 2003	Winnings in 2005-2006	Winnings in 2021
15	1,000,000 hryvnias (or random currency)	1,000,000 hryvnias	1,000,000 hryvnias
14	500,000 hryvnias (or random currency)	250,000 hryvnias	500,000 hryvnias
13	250,000 hryvnias (or random currency)	64,000 hryvnias	200,000 hryvnias
12	125,000 hryvnias (or random currency)	32,000 hryvnias	150,000 hryvnias
11	64,000 hryvnias (or random currency)	16,000 hryvnias	75,000 hryvnias
10	32,000 hryvnias (or random currency)	8,000 hryvnias	50,000 hryvnias
9	16,000 hryvnias (or random currency)	4,000 hryvnias	40,000 hryvnias
8	8,000 hryvnias (or random currency)	2,000 hryvnias	30,000 hryvnias
7	4,000 hryvnias (or random currency)	1,000 hryvnias	20,000 hryvnias
6	2,000 hryvnias (or random currency)	500 hryvnias	10,000 hryvnias
5	1,000 hryvnias (or random currency)	250 hryvnias	5,000 hryvnias
4	500 hryvnias (or random currency)	200 hryvnias	2,000 hryvnias
3	300 hryvnias (or random currency)	150 hryvnias	1,000 hryvnias
2	200 hryvnias (or random currency)	100 hryvnias	500 hryvnias
1	100 hryvnias (or random currency)	50 hryvnias	100 hryvnias

=== Hints ===
During the game, the player is entitled to 3 hints (from 2021, 4 hints):

- 50:50 (the computer eliminates two incorrect options)
- "Ask the audience" (studio audience voting should help in choosing the answer). In 2021, due to the COVID-19 epidemic, it was replaced with the "+1" hint.
- "Call a friend" (the opportunity to receive a hint via phone call). Between 2000 and 2002, the friend providing the hint could receive a mobile phone from sponsors.
- "Replace the Question" (replaces the question if it proves difficult for the player).

The player can use each of the three (from 2021 – four) hints only once, but in any order and at any point in the game, whether answering different or the same question. Using hints does not affect the amount of winnings.

If a player doubts their ability to answer a question correctly, they have the right to take the money and stop the game until they give a final answer.

If a player gives an incorrect answer to questions 1–5, they exit the game without any winnings. If this occurs between questions 6 and 10, they receive a guaranteed amount for the fifth question. If they reach questions 11-15 and provide an incorrect answer, they exit the game, receiving a guaranteed amount for the tenth question.

If the main player exits the game before reaching level 15, the host can offer the remaining nine players to go through the qualifying round again and determine a new main player. The game then continues with the same sequence as with the previous main player. If a player retains the right to continue the game and the time in the studio is over (the final siren announces this), the game is interrupted and the same player continues it in the next session.

== Winners ==
- Sergey Karabinsky, 1 million MDL, broadcast on June 6, 2003
- Svyatoslav Vakarchuk, 1 million UAH, broadcast on January 22, 2005
- Oleg Moroz, 1 million UAH, broadcast on December 22, 2021
- Ruslan Stokolos, 1 million UAH, broadcast on December 9, 2024
- Maria Denischuk, 1 million UAH, broadcast on November 3, 2025
