= Paulo Laserna Phillips =

Paulo Gustavo Laserna Phillips (born 15 August 1953 in Ibagué, Tolima) is a Colombian journalist, political scientist, television presenter and businessman. He was the CEO of Caracol TV between 2001 and 2011.

== Biography ==
Phillips was raised in Ibagué and belongs to a wealthy and influential family in Tolima, studied International Relations at the Institut d'Études Politiques de Paris, political sciences and senior management from University of Los Andes, and holds a Master of Public Administration from Harvard University. Mr Laserna was a member of the Bogotá City Council and was adviser to Andrés Pastrana during his campaign to the Bogotá Mayorship in 1988.

As a journalist, he worked at Caracol Radio, Q. A. P. Noticias, Noticiero Nacional and RCN TV. He presented newsmagazine En la línea and Los reencauchados (the Colombian version of Spitting Image) in the 1990s. Since 2000 Laserna is the presenter of the Colombian version of Who Wants to Be a Millionaire.
