= Who Wants to Be Rich? =

- Logo of Who Wants to Be Rich?
- Presented by: Kafui Dey
- Country of origin: Ghana
- Original language: English

Production
- Running time: 60 minutes
- Production company: GetTV Productions

Original release
- Network: GTV
- Release: 4 October 2009 – 2012

Contestant and the money tree

Who Wants to Be Rich? is a Ghanaian game show based on the original British format of Who Wants to Be a Millionaire?. The show is hosted by Kafui Dey. The main goal of the game is to win ₵50,000 by answering 15 multiple-choice questions correctly. There are three lifelines - fifty fifty, phone-a-friend and ask the audience. There are only 8 contestants in Fastest Finger First round. Who Wants to Be Rich? is broadcast from October 2009 to 2012. It is shown on the GTV. When a contestant gets the fifth question correct, they will leave with at least ₵300. When a contestant gets the tenth question correct, they will leave with at least ₵1,500.

== The game's prizes ==
The payout structure is as below.

Payout structure
Question number	Question value
Question number	(Yellow zones are the guaranteed levels)
1	₵50
2	₵75
3	₵125
4	₵200
5	₵300
6	₵425
7	₵575
8	₵750
9	₵1,000
10	₵1,500
11	₵3,000
12	₵6,000
13	₵12,000
14	₵25,000
15	₵50,000
