= Qui sera millionnaire? =

Belgian television quiz show

- Genre: Quiz show
- Created by: David Briggs; Mike Whitehill; Steven Knight
- Based on: Who Wants to Be a Millionaire?
- Presented by: Alain Simons
- Theme music composer: Keith Strachan; Matthew Strachan; Ramon Covalo; Nick Magnus (2008)
- Country of origin: Belgium
- Original language: French

Production
- Running time: 52 minutes

Original release
- Network: RTL-TVI
- Release: 28 August 2000 – June 2005
- Release: 8 September – 13 October 2008

Qui sera millionnaire? (English: Who Will Be a Millionaire?) is the French-language Belgian adaptation of the original British format Who Wants to Be a Millionaire?. Hosted by Alain Simons, it aired on RTL-TVI from 28 August 2000 to June 2005, and from September to October 2008.

== Money tree ==
Payout structure
Question number	Question value	
Question number	2000–2001	2002–2005 2008
15	10,000,000 BEF (€247,894)	€1,000,000
14	5,000,000 BEF (€123,947)	€125,000
13	3,000,000 BEF (€74,368)	€75,000
12	2,000,000 BEF (€49,579)	€50,000
11	1,000,000 BEF (€24,789)	€25,000
10	500,000 BEF (€12,395)	€12,500
9	300,000 BEF (€7,437)	€8,000
8	150,000 BEF (€3,718)	€4,000
7	80,000 BEF (€1,983)	€2,000
6	40,000 BEF (€992)	€1,000
5	20,000 BEF (€496)	€500
4	10,000 BEF (€248)	€250
3	5,000 BEF (€124)	€125
2	2,000 BEF (€50)	€50
1	1,000 BEF (€25)	€25
Milestone Top prize

== History ==
The show began with a jackpot of 10 million Belgian francs. Only one contestant, Katia Savignano on 4 June 2001, won the jackpot in the entire history of the show. Starting from 31 December 2001, the jackpot became €1,000,000, roughly four times as much as before. The series reached peaks of 700,000 viewers, a 40% market share.

In June 2005, it was announced that the show would not return for autumn, having already been put earlier in the schedule due to the success of Lost. It remained off air until it was announced in July 2008 that it would return. Running from 8 September to 13 October, it received an average audience of 379,000 (21.7% market share).
