= Who Deserves to be a Millionaire? =

Chinese television game show

- Logo
- Original title: 百万智多星
- Presented by: Li Fan
- Theme music composer: Keith Strachan; Matthew Strachan
- Country of origin: China
- No. of seasons: 1
- No. of episodes: 30

Production
- Production locations: Guangzhou, China
- Running time: 80 minutes

Original release
- Network: Guizhou TV
- Release: 29 September 2007 – 19 April 2008

Who Deserves to be a Millionaire? (Chinese: 百万智多星; pinyin: Bǎi Wàn Zhì Duō Xīng) is a Chinese game show, hosted by Li Fan (李凡). It was based on the original British format of Who Wants to Be a Millionaire?. The contestant's main goal was to win 1,000,000 Chinese yuan by answering 15 multiple-choice questions correctly. This edition used the original 3 lifelines: Fifty Fifty, Phone A Friend and Ask The Audience. The first episode was broadcast on 29 September 2007. After answering five questions correctly, a contestant took home ¥5,000. If he/she answered ten questions correctly, he/she left with ¥75,000. Due to the strict limit that Chinese game shows cannot offer prizes more than ¥100,000, contestants may only take 10% of their winnings, while the rest are donated for chosen charities. The episodes were shown on Saturdays at 20:40 (UTC+8) on Guizhou TV. The series ran until 19 April 2008, where the channel had adjustment issues.

The series was produced in Guangzhou.

== Characteristics of the Chinese version ==
The Mainland China version differs from all other versions of the show for the fact that it doesn't feature civil contestants taking home the money won during the game, but celebrities playing for money which is given to charity, due to a government decree that television programmes need to be uplifting and inspiring.

== Money tree ==
Payout structure
Question number	Question value (in RMB)
15	¥1,000,000
14	¥500,000
13	¥300,000
12	¥200,000
11	¥125,000
10	¥75,000
9	¥40,000
8	¥30,000
7	¥20,000
6	¥10,000
5	¥5,000
4	¥4,000
3	¥3,000
2	¥2,000
1	¥1,000
Milestone Top prize
