= Kush do të bëhet milioner? =

Albanian game show

- Genre: Quiz show
- Presented by: Veton Ibrahimi (2008–2009); Fehmi Ferati (2009–2010); Agron Llakaj (2011–2012); Enkel Demi (2014)
- Composers: Keith Strachan; Matthew Strachan; Ramon Covalo; Nick Magnus
- Countries of origin: Kosovo; Albania
- Original language: Albanian
- No. of seasons: 5
- No. of episodes: 146

Production
- Producer: Enis Ujkani
- Production companies: Grand Media Entertainment; 2waytraffic

Original release
- Network: RTK 1 (Kosovo); Albanian Screen (Albania 2008–2010); TV Klan (Albania 2011–2012); RTSH (Albania 2014)
- Release: 15 December 2008 – 6 June 2014

Related
- Who Wants to Be a Millionaire?

Kush do të bëhet milioner? (lit. 'Who Will Become A Millionaire') is the Albanian version of Who Wants to Be a Millionaire?. It was first premiered on 15 December 2008, on RTK 1 using the original format. Again, on 7 March 2014, it was again aired on a different channel, RTSH, using the risk format. In original format, it was hosted by Veton Ibrahimi, Fehmi Ferati and Agron Llakaj and in the risk format era, Enkel Demi hosted the show. Between 2008 and 2012, the series aired only on Monday at 9:00 pm and in 2014, it was aired only on Friday. There were five seasons.

The fifth season was syndicated for the Macedonian audience on TV Shenja in 2016. The same was released on GjirafaVideo on 10 April 2017.

== Seasons ==
The first season of this show was aired on RTK 1 on 15 December 2008 and ended on 27 April 2009 which was hosted by Veton Ibrahimi, 20 episodes were produced.

The second season aired from 27 September 2009 and ended on 7 June 2010 which was hosted by Fehmi, 35 episodes were produced.

The third season was aired from 17 September 2010 and ended on 25 July 2011 which was hosted by Agron Llakaj, 30 episodes were produced.

The fourth season was aired from 12 September 2011 and ended on 30 July 2012, also hosted by Llakaj, airing 46 episodes.

The fifth season was aired on RTSH on 7 March 2014 and ended on 6 June 2014 which was hosted by Enkel Demi, 15 episode were produced.

== Rules ==
- 50-50
- Phone-a-Friend (Telefonoi Mikut, Telefono Mikun)
- Ask the Audience (Pyete Audiencën, Pyet Publikun)
- Switch the Question (Ndërrimi i pyetjes) (Presented in 2014, used in risk format only)

== Money Trees ==
Payout structure
Question number	Question value	
Question number	15 December 2008 – 30 July 2012	7 March 2014 – 6 June 2014
15	€50,000	€25,000
14	€25,000	€12,000
13	€12,000	€6,000
12	€6,000	€3,000
11	€3,000	€1,500
10	€1,750	€1,000
9	€850	€750
8	€650	€550
7	€500	€350
6	€350	€250
5	€250	€150
4	€150	€100
3	€100	€50
2	€50	€25
1	€25	€10
Milestone Top prize

== Winners ==
=== Penultimate prize winners ===
- Edgar Çani - €25,000 (11 April 2011)
- Ervis Bregu - €25,000 (March 2012)

=== €6,000 winners ===
- Enver Petrovci (28 December 2009)
- Ilir Avdiu (26 April 2010)

=== €3,000 winners ===
- Agim Doëi (until February 2009)
- Lumnije Ferati (7 June 2010)

=== €1,750 winners ===
- Julian Deda (28 December 2009)
- Endrit Bytyqi (28 May 2012)
- Tedi Ramaj (28 May 2012)
- Erza Ahmeti (28 May 2012)
- Sereda Zyriqi (28 May 2012)
- Fjolla Berbatovci (28 May 2012)
- Ergi Minga (28 May 2012)

=== €850 winners ===
- Tom Krypa (31 May 2010)
- Florian Kurti (2011)

=== €650 winners ===
- Neritan Vito (April 2009)
- Erion Sejdijaj (April 2009)

=== €500 winners ===
- Myrteza Dika (February 2010)

=== €250 winners ===
- Alkeda Baxhija (April 2009)

=== €? winners ===
- Thanas Kulo (8 November 2009)
- Fatos Kryeziu and Donat Qosja (28 December 2009)
- Altin Goci (28 December 2009)
- Genti Kavaja (8 February 2010)
