= Who Wants to Be a Millionaire? (Thai game show) =

Thai television quiz show

- Thai: เกมเศรษฐี
- Genre: Quiz show
- Created by: Born & Associated Co. Ltd (unlicensed)
- Based on: Original format created and licensed by Sony Pictures Television Studios
- Presented by: Traiphop Limpapath
- Country of origin: Thailand

Production
- Running time: 30 min (2000–2008)

Original release
- Network: Channel 3 (2000–2004) iTV/TITV (2004–2008)
- Release: March 4, 2000 – January 14, 2008

Studio of the show.

Millionaire Millennium (Thai: เกมเศรษฐี, RTGS: Kem Setthi) is a Thai game show based on the original British format of Who Wants to Be a Millionaire?. The main goal of the game was to win 1 million baht by answering 15 multiple-choice questions correctly (earlier 16 or 12 questions). There were three lifelines, all other than in the original version - Double Dip (contestant can choose the answer two times), Switch The Question (contestant can change the question) and Ask The Host (the help of the host who believes that he knows the correct answer). Earlier the lifelines were: Fifty Fifty, Phone A Friend, Ask The Audience, and Power Paplu.

== Money tree ==
Question number	Question value (Yellow zones are the guaranteed levels)
Question number	12-question format (Note: Failing to answer correctly, the contestant will walk away with 50% of its last question value.)
1	฿15,000
2	฿20,000
3	฿25,000
4	฿30,000
5	฿35,000
6	฿40,000
7	฿45,000
8	฿50,000
9	฿100,000
10	฿200,000
11	฿500,000
12	฿1,000,000

Previously, the money tree consisted of the following prizes:

Question number	Question value (Yellow zones are the guaranteed levels)			
Question number	First version	Second version	Third version	Fourth version
1	฿1,000	฿5,000		
2	฿2,000	฿6,000	฿10,000	
3	฿3,000	฿7,000	฿15,000	
4	฿4,000	฿8,000	฿20,000	
5	฿5,000	฿9,000	฿25,000	
6	฿10,000		฿30,000	
7	฿20,000		฿35,000	
8	฿30,000		฿40,000	
9	฿40,000		฿45,000	
10	฿50,000	฿50,000		
11	฿100,000			
12	฿200,000			฿150,000
13	฿300,000			฿200,000
14	฿400,000			฿250,000
15	฿500,000			
16	฿1,000,000			

== Top prize winners ==
Siksaka Bunluerith's 1 million baht question

฿1,000,000 (16 of 16) – no time limit

Which reptile has a four-chamber heart?

1. Snake
2. Turtle
3. Crocodile(correct answer)
4. Lizard

Siksaka Bunluerith is the first and only Thai contestant to legitimately win the top prize of 1 million baht by answering all 16 questions in October 2000.

== The Lertlak Panchanawaporn affair ==
In 2002, Lertlak Panchanawaporn, a 44-year-old street vendor won the grand prize on the show. The show's producers were impressed with her, since she had only a fourth-grade education. Finally, the truth came to light: a computer error led to the player being fed all the right answers. The cable feeding the player the answers on the computer screen was supposed to be hooked up to the presenter's computer. She had noticed that the right answers were constantly highlighted on her computer screen and won the million by this way. The show's producers took the million away from her. Later, she was allowed to play again and she won 25,000 baht in her second play-through. Articles about it were written in many TV stations, newspapers and websites (e.g. BBC and Deutsche Welle). There was also a chapter about it in the book Dear Valued Customer, You Are a Loser: And Over 100 Other Embarrassing and Funny Stories of Technology Gone Mad by Rick Broadhead.
