= Þorsteinn J. =

Icelandic TV personality

- Born: Þorsteinn J. Vilhjálmsson
- Other name: Þorsteinn J.
- Occupation: Filmmaker

Þorsteinn Jens Vilhjálmsson, popularly known simply as Þorsteinn J., is an Icelandic television host and filmmaker. He received the Åke Blomström Award in 1994.

He has co-hosted Stöð 2's primetime news/talk show Ísland í dag, and Viltu vinna milljón, the Icelandic version of Who Wants To Be A Millionaire?. Þorsteinn was nominated as TV personality of the year at the 2007 Edda Awards.
