= Koj saka da bide milioner? =

Macedonian television quiz show

- Logo
- Macedonian: Кој сака да биде милионер?
- Presented by: Sašo Macanovski-Trendo
- Country of origin: Macedonia

Production
- Running time: 60 minutes

Original release
- Network: A1
- Release: March 25, 2004 – November 2009

Old titles of Кој сака да биде милионер?

Fragment of the show; contestant and money tree

Кој сака да биде милионер? (English translation: Who wants to be a millionaire?, transliteration: Koj saka da bide milioner?) is a Macedonian game show based on the original British format of Who Wants to Be a Millionaire?. The show is hosted by Sašo Macanovski-Trendo. The main goal of the game is to win 4 million MKD (earlier 3 million) by answering 15 multiple-choice questions correctly. There are three lifelines - Fifty Fifty, Phone A Friend and Ask The Audience. Кој сака да биде милионер? originally aired in 2004. It is broadcast on the Macedonian TV station A1. When a contestant gets the fifth question correct, he is guaranteed to leave with at least 5,000 MKD. When a contestant gets the tenth question correct, he is guaranteed to leave with at least 125,000 MKD (earlier 100,000 MKD).

Nobody won the top prize, but a contestant on November 29, 2009 won 2,000,000 MKD after answering 14 questions correctly.

== The game's prizes ==
Payout structure
Question number	Question value (in MKD)	
Question number	2004-2006	2007-2009
1	500	
2	1,000	
3	2,000	
4	3,000	
5	5,000	
6	8,000	
7	15,000	16,000
8	25,000	32,000
9	50,000	64,000
10	100,000	125,000
11	175,000	250,000
12	350,000	500,000
13	750,000	1,000,000
14	1,500,000	2,000,000
15	3,000,000	4,000,000
