= Miliyoner =

Television Game Show

- Contestant and the money tree
- Also known as: Millionaire
- Presented by: Ciwan Haco &; many alternative? Masum Elmas and Ozan Kardaş
- Country of origin: Iraq

Original release
- Network: Kanal4; TRT Kurdi
- Release: November 2009 – 2011

Milyonêr (English translation: Millionaire) is an Iraqi Kurdish-language game show based on the original British format of Who Wants to Be a Millionaire? The show is hosted by Shuan Haco. The main goal of the game is to win 100 million Iraqi dinar by answering 15 multiple-choice questions correctly. There are three lifelines - fifty fifty, phone a friend and ask the audience.

Milyonêr was broadcast from 2009 to 2011. It is shown on the Kurdistani TV station Kanal4 and TRT Kurdi. When a contestant gets the third question correct, he will leave with at least ID 25,000. When a contestant gets the sixth question correct, he will leave with at least ID 250,000. When a contestant gets the ninth question correct, he will leave with at least ID 3,000,000. When a contestant gets the twelfth question correct, he will with at least ID 15,000,000.

Later the guaranteed sum was changed, now they was appeared on question 5 and 10.

== The game's prizes ==
Payout structure
| Question number | Question value | | |
| Question number | 2009–2010 | 2010 | 2011 |
|---|---|---|---|
| 15 | ID 100,000,000 | | |
| 14 | ID 50,000,000 | | |
| 13 | ID 30,000,000 | | |
| 12 | ID 15,000,000 | ID 15,000,000 | |
| 11 | ID 9,000,000 | | ID 7,500,000 |
| 10 | ID 6,000,000 | ID 6,000,000 | |
| 9 | ID 3,000,000 | ID 3,000,000 | |
| 8 | ID 1,500,000 | | |
| 7 | ID 750,000 | | |
| 6 | ID 250,000 | ID 250,000 | |
| 5 | ID 100,000 | ID 100,000 | |
| 4 | ID 50,000 | | |
| 3 | ID 25,000 | ID 25,000 | |
| 2 | ID 10,000 | | |
| 1 | ID 5,000 | | |
Milestone Top prize
