= Arve Juritzen =

Norwegian book publisher (born 1960)

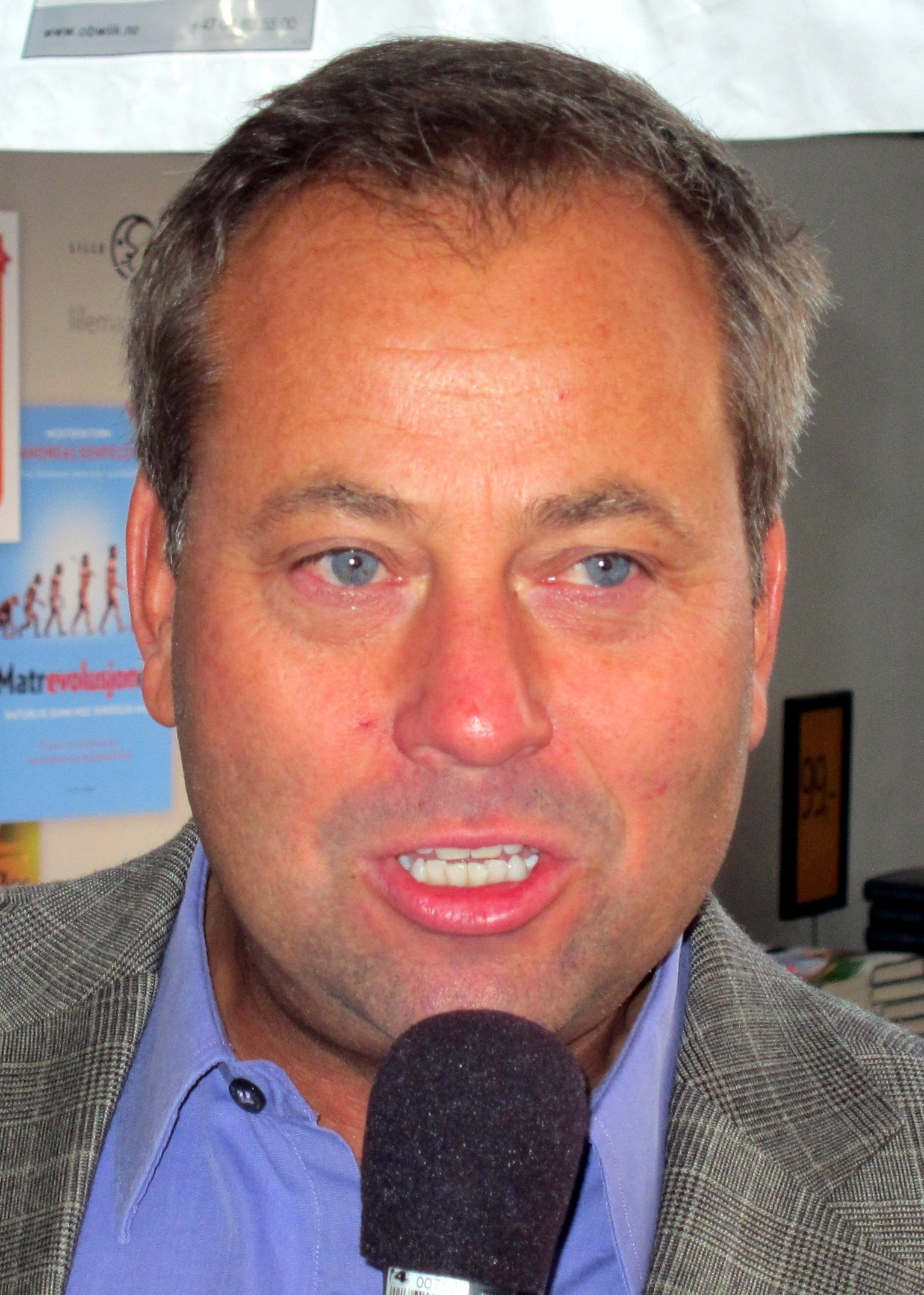
Arve Juritzen, 2011.

Arve Otter Juritzen (born 10 November 1960) is a Norwegian book publisher.

In his early career he was a journalist, television presenter and television producer. He founded the publishing house Juritzen Forlag in 2006, which among others is the Norwegian publisher of Cecilia Samartin. He has also written six books himself and even appeared in Star Wars: Episode V - The Empire Strikes Back as a rebel soldier in the Battle of Hoth scenes, as the majority of extras during that scene were Norwegians from Finse, Norway, where filming of the Hoth landscape and battle took place. He also presented the first two series of Big Brother between 2001 and 2002 and the first series of Vil du bli millionær, the Norwegian version of Who Wants to Be a Millionaire?, in 2000.
