= Wie wordt euromiljonair? =

- Logo of Wie wordt euromiljonair?
- Also known as: Wie wordt multimiljonair?
- Created by: David Briggs; Mike Whitehill; Steven Knight
- Presented by: Walter Grootaers
- Composers: Keith Strachan; Matthew Strachan
- Country of origin: Belgium

Original release
- Network: VTM
- Release: 1999 – 2006

Wie wordt euromiljonair? (Dutch pronunciation: [ˈʋi ˈʋɔrt ˈøːroːmɪljoːˌnɛːr], English translation: Who will be a euromillionaire?) is a Belgian quiz show based on the original British format of Who Wants to Be a Millionaire?. The show was hosted by Walter Grootaers. The main goal of the game was to win €1 million by answering 15 multiple-choice questions correctly. Wie wordt euromiljonair? was broadcast from 2002 to 2006. The show was shown on the VTM. The first safe haven was on question 5 for €500, the second one on question 10 for €12,500.

== 2002 - 2006 payout structure ==
| Question number | Question value |
| Question number | (Yellow zones are the guaranteed levels) |
|---|---|
| 1 | €25 |
| 2 | €50 |
| 3 | €125 |
| 4 | €250 |
| 5 | €500 |
| 6 | €1,000 |
| 7 | €2,000 |
| 8 | €4,000 |
| 9 | €7,000 |
| 10 | €12,500 |
| 11 | €25,000 |
| 12 | €50,000 |
| 13 | €125,000 |
| 14 | €250,000 |
| 15 | €1,000,000 |

== Old version ==
From 1999 to 2001, it was called Wie wordt multimiljonair? (Dutch pronunciation: [ˈʋi ˈʋɔrt ˈmʏltimɪljoːˌnɛːr], English translation: Who will be a multimillionaire?). Its host was also Walter Grootaers. The biggest prize was 20 million Belgian francs.

== 1999 - 2001 payout structure ==
| Question number | Question value |
| Question number | (Yellow zones are the guaranteed levels) |
|---|---|
| 1 | 1,000 BEF (€25) |
| 2 | 2,000 BEF (€50) |
| 3 | 5,000 BEF (€124) |
| 4 | 10,000 BEF (€248) |
| 5 | 20,000 BEF (€496) |
| 6 | 40,000 BEF (€992) |
| 7 | 80,000 BEF (€1,983) |
| 8 | 150,000 BEF (€3,718) |
| 9 | 300,000 BEF (€7,437) |
| 10 | 500,000 BEF (€12,395) |
| 11 | 1,000,000 BEF (€24,789) |
| 12 | 2,000,000 BEF (€49,579) |
| 13 | 5,000,000 BEF (€123,947) |
| 14 | 10,000,000 BEF (€247,894) |
| 15 | 20,000,000 BEF (€495,787) |
