= Mayssa Maghrebi =

Emirati-Moroccan actress (born 1983)

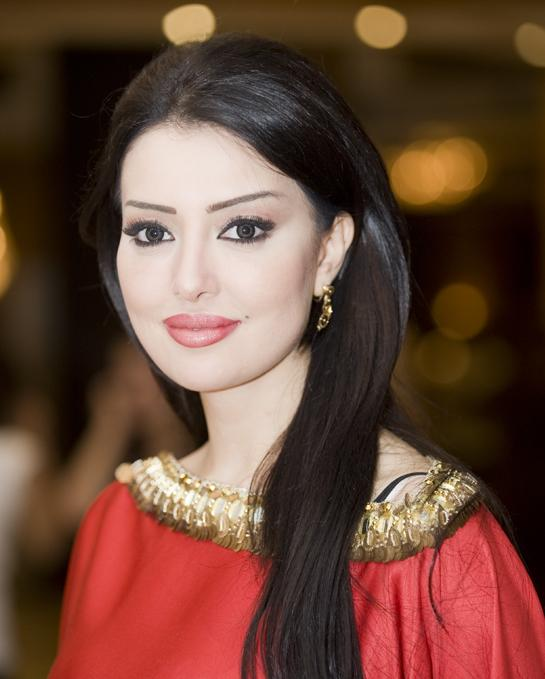
- Maghribi in 2008
- Born: 19 August 1978 (age 48); Meknes, Morocco
- Occupation: Actress
- Years active: 2000–present
- Family: Nina Maghrebi (sister)

Mayssa Maghrebi (Arabic: ميساء مغربي; born 19 August 1978) is an Emirati-Moroccan actress. She started working in 2000. She acted in several Egyptian, Saudi, Kuwaiti, Qatari and Emirati television series.
