= Jorge Antunes (actor) =

Angolan actor and television host

- Born: Angola
- Occupations: Actor and TV Host

Jorge Antunes is an Angolan actor and TV host. He is best known for hosting Estrelas ao Palco on TPA and Quem quer ser milionário? (Who Wants to Be a Millionaire?).
