= Hans Pilgaard =

Danish journalist and television host

Hans Pilgaard (born 2 August 1963) is a Danish journalist and television host. Since 1995, he has worked in Nordisk Film. However, he is usually rented to TV2.

After his training as a journalist in Berlingske Tidende, he started working in TV2 Denmark and the first program he hosted was the game show Eleva2ren. In 1997, Hans Pilgaard started hosting the morning program Go'Morgen on TV2 as well. Hans Pilgaard was also a rolling host of the Danish version of the British game show Who Wants To Be A Millionaire? (Hvem vil være millionær?) and Gi' Mig 5 the Danish version of the game show Power of Ten. Pilgaard had a minor role in the movie Clash of Egos (Sprængfarlig bombe).

He is married to Jobbe Pilgaard who is a TV host and writer.
