= Alfonso Espinosa de los Monteros =

Ecuadorian news anchor

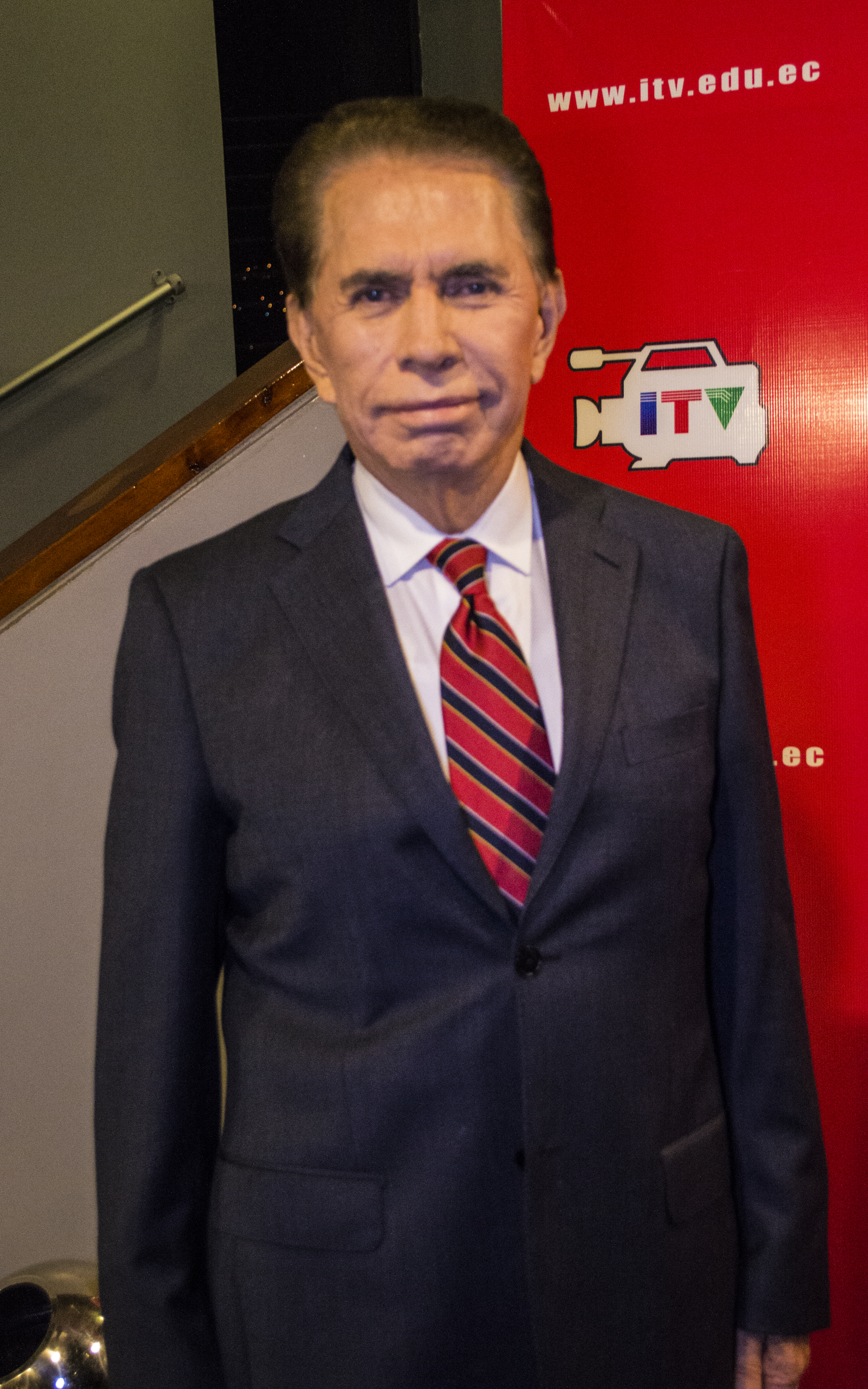
- Espinosa de los Monteros in 2016
- Born: Pablo Alfonso Espinosa de los Monteros Rueda; 25 December 1941 (age 84); Quito, Pichincha Province, Ecuador
- Occupation: News anchor
- Years active: 1960s–2023

Pablo Alfonso Espinosa de los Monteros Rueda (born 25 December 1941) is an Ecuadorian former news anchor. He was also vice-president of news of Ecuavisa in Quito. He holds the Guinness World Record for "Longest career as Television News broadcaster".

== Early life ==
Espinosa de los Monteros was born on 25 December 1941, in Quito, Ecuador.

== Career ==
He worked for different radio stations in the cities of Ibarra and Guayaquil until 1962. In 1963 he was news director for "Radio La Prensa". He began in Ecuavisa in 1967, the year of its foundation, as the first news anchor of the station. He was News Director for almost three decades.

He has been the master of ceremonies in television shows carried out by several editions of the election of Miss Ecuador, Queen of Quito, and the International Song Festival OTI Ecuador Chapter, which gave birth to the OTI Festival. As an interviewer, he has conducted opinion programs such as "Ante la Prensa," "Encuentro," "Punto de vista," and "Presidential Decisions." He hosted the Ecuadorian version of Who Wants to Be a Millionaire? from 2001 to 2004 and 2009 to 2011.

On October 13, 2016, he presented the first volume of his book entitled "Memories," a work in which he recounted his experiences as a journalist between 1961 and 2016, a period in which Ecuador lived through populist regimes, dictatorship, and other governments.

He received the “Honorato Vázquez” medal from the Ecuadorian government in 1992.

In 2013, after a survey carried out in Ecuador, he emerged as the news anchor with the highest credibility index, with 21.4%.

In 2015, in the solemn session for the founding process of Guayaquil, Mayor Jaime Nebot awarded him a Prize for Cultural Merit for his trajectory.

On 1 May 2023, Alfonso Espinosa retired from Ecuavisa after 56 years.
