= Cem Öğretir =

Turkish TV presenter and reporter (born 1973)

- Born: 10 September 1973 (age 53); England, UK
- Occupations: TV presenter, news anchor
- Years active: 1995–present
- Spouse: Seda Öğretir
- Children: 1

Cem Öğretir (born 10 September 1973) is a Turkish TV presenter and reporter.

== Life and career ==
Öğretir was born in England and spent his childhood in Eskişehir. In 1995, he graduated from Anadolu University with a degree in cinema and television studies.

He had his first professional experience in 1995 after joining the crew of Mehmet Ali Birand's program 32. Gün on Show TV. In 1999, he left Show TV and started working for Star TV. A year later he joined CNN Türk and worked both as an editor and presenter. After leaving CNN Türk in 2005, he taught television courses at İletişim Academy. In 2008, at the offer of Fatih Altaylı, he joined Kanal 1 but his career there did not last long. Öğretir then joined Erdoğan Aktaş's team and presented the program Gün Ortası on Habertürk TV. After Aktaş's transfer to ATV, Öğretir officially started working for the channel on 10 August 2009 and became the main news bulletin presenter. In 2012, he taught presenting and diction courses at Burç College.

Since 2006 he has been married to fellow TV news presenter Seda Öğretir with whom he has a daughter.

== Awards ==
Year	Award	Category	Result
2018	45th Golden Butterfly Awards	Best Male News Presenter	Won
2020	46th Golden Butterfly Awards	Best Male News Presenter	Won
