= DJ Fateh =

Azerbaijani producer, television presenter

- Born: Mammadali Nazim oglu Mammadov; 1 February 1983 (age 43); Baku, Azerbaijan SSR
- Education: Azerbaijan State Oil Academy
- Occupations: Producer, blogger, television presenter, DJ
- Years active: 1999–present
- Employer(s): ITV and İctimai Radio
- Awards: Taraggi Medal

Mammadali Nazim oglu Mammadov (born 1 February 1983) better known as DJ Fateh, is an Azerbaijani producer, television presenter, DJ. He is director of İctimai Radio since 2018.

== Biography ==
DJ Fateh was born on 1 February 1983, in Baku. He studied at school No. 42 between 1990 and 2000. In 2000 he entered the Azerbaijan State Oil Academy.

He is host of Brain Ring intellectual show since 2013.

DJ Fateh currently works in İctimai Television and İctimai Radio.

== Awards ==
- Taraggi Medal

== Filmography ==
- Vəkil hanı? (2011)
- Oğlan Evi: Azərbaycansayağı qarət (2015)
- Oğlan evi 2 (2016)
