= ¿Quién quiere ser millonario? =

¿Quién quiere ser millonario? is the title of several Who Wants to Be a Millionaire? franchise game shows in Spanish-speaking countries.

- ¿Quién quiere ser millonario? (Argentine game show)
- ¿Quién quiere ser millonario? (Chilean game show)
- ¿Quién quiere ser millonario? (Colombian game show)
- ¿Quién quiere ser millonario? (Costa Rican game show)
- ¿Quién quiere ser millonario? (Ecuadorian game show)
- ¿Quién quiere ser millonario? (Salvadoran game show)
- ¿Quién quiere ser millonario? (Mexican game show)
- ¿Quién quiere ser millonario? (Peruvian game show)
- ¿Quién quiere ser millonario? (Panamanian game show)
- ¿Quién quiere ser millonario? (Spanish game show)
- ¿Quién quiere ser millonario? (Uruguayan game show)
- ¿Quién quiere ser millonario? (Venezuelan game show)
