= Catherine Fulop =

Venezuelan-Argentine actress, model, beauty pageant contestant and television presenter

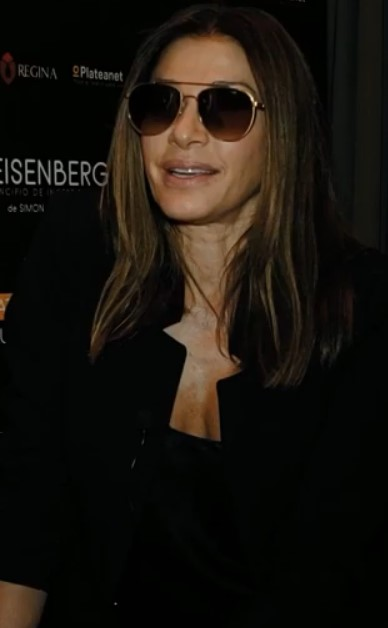
- Fulop in 2018
- Born: Catherine Amanda Fulop García; 11 March 1965 (age 61); Caracas, Venezuela
- Citizenship: Venezuela (1965–); Argentina (2021–present)
- Occupations: Actress; Model; Television presenter; Radio Host
- Years active: 1986-present
- Spouses: Fernando Carrillo (m. 1990; div. 1994); Osvaldo Sabatini (m. 1998)
- Children: 2, including Oriana Sabatini
- Parent(s): György Fülöp; Cleopatra Geoconda García

Catherine Amanda Fulop García (born 11 March 1965) is a Venezuelan and Argentine actress, model, beauty pageant contestant, television presenter and radio host. She participated in the Miss Venezuela 1986, finishing as the fourth runner–up and in Miss Latin America, finishing as the third runner–up. Fulop has since launched a successful acting career throughout Latin America, most notably on television.

== Biography ==
Catherine Amanda Fulop García was born on March 11, 1965, in Caracas, Venezuela. She is the fifth daughter of a large family, of a Venezuelan mother, Cleopatra Geoconda García, and Hungarian father, György Fülöp, who emigrated to Venezuela after World War II. She has six sisters and one brother.

== Personal life ==
Since 1990, she was married to actor Fernando Carrillo. The couple divorced in 1994 with Catherine Fulop accusing Carrillo of infidelity.

On 3 April 1998, she married the Argentine actor and businessman Osvaldo Sabatini, brother of the popular Argentine tennis player Gabriela Sabatini. On 19 April 1996, she gave birth to the couple's first child, a girl, whom they called Oriana Sabatini. On 1 June 1999, she gave birth to the couple's second child, a girl, whom they called Tiziana Beatriz Sabatini. Catherine Fulop and Osvaldo Sabatini briefly separated in 2001, but eventually reconciled. The family currently resides in Buenos Aires, Argentina.

== Career ==
=== Modeling career ===
In 1986, she participated in the Venezuelan beauty pageant Miss Venezuela 1986 representing the state of Vargas and she was chosen as a fourth finalist. In 1986, she participated in the Venezuelan beauty pageant Miss Latin America and she was chosen as the third finalist.

=== Television career ===
Catherine Fulop began her career in television in the year 1987 in the television series Roberta where she makes a small participation. In 1987, she was the protagonist of the television series Mi amada Beatriz with Miguel Alcántara. In 1988, she was the protagonist of the television series La muchacha del Circo with Fernando Carrillo. In 1988, she was the protagonist of the television series Amor Marcado with Fernando Carrillo. From 1988 to 1989, she was the protagonist of the television series Abigail with Fernando Carrillo. From 1990 to 1991, she was the protagonist of the television series Pasionaria with Fernando Carrillo. From 1990 to 1991, she was the protagonist of the television series Mundo de fieras with Jean Carlo Simancas. From 1993 to 1994, she was the protagonist of the television series Déjate querer with Carlos Mata. In 1994, she made a small participation in the television series ¡Grande, pa!. In 1994, she was the protagonist of the television series Cara bonita with Fernando Carrillo. From 2002 to 2003, she was part of the cast of the youth television series Rebelde Way starring Camila Bordonaba, Felipe Colombo, Luisana Lopilato and Benjamín Rojas. In 2004, she makes a small participation in the television series La niñera. In 2005, she makes a small participation in the television series ¿Quién es el Jefe?. In 2009, she makes a small participation in the television series Los exitosos Pells. In 2010, she makes a small participation in the television series La mujer perfecta. In 2011, she was the protagonist of the television series Porque te quiero así. In 2013, she makes a small participation in the television series Sos mi hombre. From 2013 to 2014, she was part of the cast of the television series Taxxi, amores cruzados. In 2015, she makes a small participation in the television series Viudas e hijos del Rock & Roll. From 2016 to 2017, she was part of the cast of the television series Por amarte así.

=== Personal life ===
A Venezuelan citizen by birth, Fulop became a naturalized Argentine citizen in March 2021.

== Filmography ==
=== Television ===
Year	Title	Character	Channel
1987	Roberta	Belkys	RCTV
1987-1988	Mi amada Beatriz	Beatriz de la Caridad Castañeda	RCTV
1988	La muchacha del circo	Raiza Reyes/Adelina Sulbaran	RCTV
1988-1989	Abigail	Abigail Guzmán de Ruiz	RCTV
1989-1990	Amor marcado		RCTV
1990-1991	Pasionaria	Bárbara Santana de Monteverde	Venevisión
1991-1992	Mundo de fieras	Rosario "Charito" Flores/Viviana Flores	Venevisión
1993-1994	Déjate querer	Bárbara Sánchez	Telefe
1994	Habitación 503	Leticia Elena	TVE
1994	¡Grande, pa!	Verónica	Telefe
1994	Cara bonita	René "Nené"	Telefe
1997	Archivo negro	Rebeca Núñez	Canal 13
1998	Chica cósmica	Alien	América TV
2000	Tiempo final	Ana	Telefe
2000-2001	Ilusiones compartidas	Caridad Guanarito	Canal 13
2001	Poné a Francella		Telefe
2002-2003	Rebelde Way	Sonia Rey	Canal 9/América TV
2004	De la cama al living		TV Pública
2004	La niñera		Telefe
2005	¿Quién es el Jefe?	Natalia	Telefe
2005	Una familia especial		Canal 13
2006	Los ex		Telefe
2009	Los exitosos Pells	Julia	Telefe
2010	La mujer perfecta		Venevisión
2011	Los únicos	Jéssica Durán Valdés	Canal 13
2011	Porque te quiero así	Alejandra Guzmán	Canal 10
2012	La pelu		Telefe
2013	Sos mi hombre	Violeta Argüello	Canal 13
2013-2014	Taxxi, amores cruzados	Lucía Linares	Telefe
2015	Viudas e hijos del Rock & Roll	Míriam	Telefe
2016-2017	Por amarte así	Fátima Pellegrini	Telefe

=== Theater ===
Year	Title	Character
1987	El amor y el interés	
1989	Ensayo de amor	
1990	El cuarto y el tiempo	
2001-2002	Extraña pareja femenina	
2002	Monólogos de la vagina	
2004	El show de las divorciadas	
2006-2007	Un país de revista	
2008	Rosa de dos aromas	
2009	Educando a Rita	

=== Television Programs ===
Year	Program	Channel	Notes
1992-1993	Viéndonos	TVE	Host
1999	Metro Show	América TV	Host
1999-2000	Corazón partido	Televisión Nacional de Chile	Guest Host
2002-2008	Catherine 100%	Fox Sports	Host
2003	El tiempo es dinero	Canal 9	Host
2007	Bailando por un Sueño 2007	Canal 13	Participant
2008	Tendencia	Canal 9	Host
2008-2011	Talento Argentino	Telefe	Judge
2009	Viña del Mar International Song Festival	Canal 13/Televisión Nacional de Chile	Judge
2009	Animal Nocturno	Televisión Nacional de Chile	Guest Host
2012	Todo por Amor	Telefe	Host
2012	¿Quién quiere casarse con mi hijo?	Telefe	Host
2014	Talento Argentino	Telefe	Judge
2015	Los unos y los otros	América TV	Host
2017	Bailando 2017	Canal 13	Accompanying Melina Lezcano in Salsa in trios
2018	Como todo	Net TV	Guest
2018	Pampita íntima	Net TV	Guest
2019-2020	¿Quién quiere ser millonario?	Telefe	Guest
2020	Tardes Bellas	Ciudad Magazine	Host
2021	MasterChef Celebrity Argentina 3	Telefe	Participant
2022-present	Talento rojo	Televisión Nacional de Chile	Judge

=== Movies ===
Year	Movie	Character	Director
1994	Marbella antivicio		Álex de la Iglesia
2005	Mercenarios		Enrique Aguilar
2007	Marigold	Sister Fernandéz	Willard Carroll
2011	Solos en la ciudad	Mariela	Diego Corsini

== Awards and nominations ==
Year	Award	Category	Work	Result
1998	TP de Oro	Best Actress	Abigail	Nominated
2009	Viña del Mar International Song Festival	Queen of the Viña del Mar Festival	Herself	Winner
