= Rosangélica =

Venezuelan television series

- Genre: Telenovela; Romance; Drama
- Created by: Delia Fiallo
- Written by: Alicia Barrios; Alberto Gómez; Henry Herrera; Abelardo Vidal; Carmen Afigne
- Story by: Delia Fiallo
- Directed by: Marcos Reyes Andrade
- Creative director: Arquímedes Rivero
- Starring: Víctor Cámara; Sonya Smith; Lupita Ferrer; Daniel Alvarado
- Opening theme: "Rosangélica" performed by Luis Fernando
- Country of origin: Venezuela
- Original language: Spanish
- No. of episodes: 125

Production
- Executive producer: Tahirí Díaz Acosta
- Producer: Mercedes Aňez
- Production locations: Caracas, Venezuela
- Camera setup: Multi-camera
- Production company: Venevisión

Original release
- Network: Venevisión
- Release: March 25 – August 23, 1993

Related
- Primavera (1987); Rosalinda (1999)

Rosangelica is a Venezuelan telenovela written by Alicia Barrios and produced by Venevisión. The telenovela is a free adaptation of María Teresa written by Delia Fiallo.

Sonya Smith and Víctor Cámara star as the main protagonists with Lupita Ferrer as the main antagonist.

== Plot ==
This is the story of Rosangelica and Oscar Eduardo whose love will be affected by secrets from the past. Twenty years ago, Rodolfo raped Gisele, his secretary. Out of fury over the incident, her husband Alberto murders Rodolfo. However, Gisele takes the blame for her husband's crime. Out of distress over the situation, she becomes mentally ill and is confined in a mental asylum. As a result of the rape, Gisele gives birth to Rosangelica.

Rosangelica grows up into a beautiful woman full of life and a talented artist. She meets Oscar Eduardo, a handsome doctor who later abandons her after discovering about her past. Just like her mother, Rosangelica is left pregnant and confined to an asylum for mental patients. Through a series of events, one of them involving a fire in the asylum, Rosangelica is presumed to be dead. However, she meets Joel, a fashion photographer who transforms her into a sensational model called Lorena Paris. As time passes by, Rosangelica will regain the memories she lost and find a second chance at love with Oscar Eduardo.

== Cast ==
- Víctor Cámara as Oscar Eduardo Gel de la Rosa / Argenis
- Sonya Smith as Rosangélica González Hernández / Elisa Montero
- Lupita Ferrer as Cecilia Gel de la Rosa
- Daniel Alvarado as Joel Cruz
- Dalila Colombo as Gisela#1
- Belén Díaz as Ligia
- Orángel Defín as Marcos González
- Hilda Blanco as Luz
- Eva Mondolfi as Verónica Hernández de González
- Angel Acosta as Roberto de la Rosa
- Omar Moinello as Leonardo Santaevo
- Nancy González as Gisela#2
- Denise Novell as Mariana González Hernández
- Eduardo Bástidas as René González Hernández
- Mónica Rubio as Martha González Hernández
- Ana Martínez as Esther de Santaevo
- Jimmy Verdum as Mocambo
- Fedra López as Marielba
- Víctor Cuica
- Ana Massimo as Rita
- Lotario as Arcadio
- Patricia Oliveros
- Regino Jiménez
- Lucy Mendoza
- Julio Berna as Juan
- Zoe Bolívar as Cinthia
- Luis Malave
- Delia López
- Yadira Casanova
- Diego Acuña
- Carolina Muzziotti as Jennifer
- Grecia Reyes as Lucero de la Rosa Hernández
- Diego Arellano Barrios as Oscar Eduardo de la Rosa
- Ayari Reyes
- Wanda D'Isidoro as Ana Elisa
- Manuel Sainz
- Elizabeth López
- Oscar Urdaneta
- Esperanza Acosta
- Joel de la Rosa
- Elba Rosa Hidaldo
- Humberto Tancredi jr.
- Henry Contreras
- María E. Barrios
- Sol Mary Liendo
- Denisse Hurtado
- Milagros Martín
- Anaís Mujíca
- Mauricio Márquez
- Rina Hernández
- Kelly Hernández
- Benigno Sanchez
- Orlando Noguera
- Francisco del Castillo
- Ramón Piñango
- Muratti Gahu
- Gabriela Spanic as Carla
- Carolina Tejera
- Hans Christopher as Luis Gerardo Cheysme
