= María Teresa (TV series) =

- Genre: Telenovela
- Created by: Delia Fiallo
- Directed by: Grazio D' Angelo
- Starring: Lupita Ferrer; José Bardina
- Opening theme: "Mi gran amor" by Juan Vicente Torrealba
- Country of origin: Venezuela
- Original language: Spanish
- No. of episodes: 186

Production
- Producer: Enrique Cuzcó

Original release
- Network: Venevisión
- Release: April 1972 – November 1972

Related
- Angélica (1985); Primavera (1987); Rosangélica (1993); Rosalinda (1999)

María Teresa is a 1972 Venezuelan telenovela written by Cuban writer Delia Fiallo and broadcast on Venevisión. The telenovela starred Lupita Ferrer and José Bardina as the main protagonists.

== Plot ==
María Teresa is a beautiful and charming woman who lives with her sickly mother Magdalena and her hard-working father Antonio. María Teresa works at a flower shop and one day, she meets Román, a young man who plays piano at a restaurant nearby. They both fall in love with each other, though she doesn't know that he is actually a millionaire.

María Teresa tells her mother she has fallen in love with Román López Bello. Seeing that she will die soon, she reveals to her husband Antonio that Teresa isn't his daughter but the daughter of her sister Eleonor who went to jail for the alleged murder of Román's father. Eleonor wasn't responsible for his death. His brother, Alfredo Fuentes Tovar, is. Years later, Eleanor is released from jail and introduces herself as María Teresa's aunt. When María Teresa introduces Román to her, she recognizes the similarities he has with his father and, afraid that her secret will be known, tries to separate them. María Eugenia also is opposed to the relationship due to mere social prejudices. Alfredo who still lives with his sister tries to reconcile with Eleanor but she cannot forgive him because of his weakness in the past, and he mistakes Reina, her niece, to be their daughter.

== Cast ==
- Lupita Ferrer- María Teresa Fuentes Tovar de López Bello/ Muñeca Montiel
- José Bardina- Román López Bello
- Ivonne Attas- Reina
- Jorge Félix- Hugo Falcon
- Reneé De Pallás- María Eugenia Fuentes Tovar Vda. de López Bello
- Eva Blanco- Leonor
- Orángel Delfín- Alfredo Fuentes Tovar
- Carlos Subero
- Rebeca González- Any
- Néstor Zavarce- Santiago
- Betty Ruth
- Enrique Alzugaray
- Ana Castell
- Caridad Canelón
- Chumico Romero
- Martha Lancaste
- Jose Oliva
- Susana Duijm

== Versions ==
Telenovela	Year	Protagonists	Channel	Ref
Angélica	1985	Erika Buenfil; Sergio Goyri	Televisa	
Primavera	1987	Gigi Zancheta; Fernando Carrillo	RCTV	
Rosangélica	1993	Sonya Smith; Víctor Cámara	Venevisión	
Rosalinda	1999	Thalía; Fernando Carrillo	Televisa	
