= Animal Nocturno (talk show) =

- Genre: Talk show
- Directed by: Daniel Sagüés
- Creative director: Creative Production Team of Televisión Nacional de Chile
- Presented by: Felipe Camiroaga (2006–2010); Camiroaga with Karen Doggenweiler (2010–2011)
- Starring: Catherine Fulop (2009); Natalia Valdebenito, Natalie Nicloux and Difamadores (2010)
- Opening theme: 2009: Reach Out (Hilary Duff); 2010–2011: Empire State of Mind (Alicia Keys)
- Ending theme: 2010–2011: Empire State of Mind (Alicia Keys)
- Country of origin: Chile
- Original language: Spanish
- No. of seasons: Nine

Production
- Executive producer: Guillermo Muñoz
- Producer: Juan Carlos Ascencio
- Editor: Jorge Mödinger
- Running time: 120 minutes approximately

Original release
- Network: Televisión Nacional de Chile
- Release: April 16, 2006 – January 30, 2011

Animal Nocturno (English: Nocturnal Animal) was a Chilean television talk show hosted by Felipe Camiroaga, and broadcast by state-owned television station Televisión Nacional de Chile. It ran nationally for nine seasons, beginning on 16 April 2006, and concluding in late January 2011.

The show was conceived by the creative production team of Televisión Nacional de Chile. Some of Camiroaga's interviewees in Animal Nocturno were former President of Chile Michelle Bachelet, current President Sebastián Piñera, television presenter Raquel Argandoña, his half-sister Paola Bontempi, amid others.
