= Mundo de fieras =

Mundo de fieras may refer to:

- Mundo de fieras (Venezuelan TV series), 1991-1992
- Mundo de fieras (Mexican TV series), 2006-2007
