= Elisa Rego =

- Born: Elisa Pérez Rego; 21 May 1964 (age 62); São Paulo, Brazil
- Origin: Caracas, Venezuela
- Genres: Latin pop, acoustic rock, neo soul, R&B, electronic rock, experimental pop
- Occupations: Singer songwriter musician
- Instruments: Vocalist
- Years active: 1988–present
- Labels: Sonográfica (1988); EMI-Rodven (1991–1995); Jardin Digital, C.A. (2005); Anes Records (2009)
- Website: MySpace.com; Facebook.com

Elisa Pérez Rego, known in music world as Elisa Rego (born 21 May 1964) is a Brazilian born Venezuelan singer, songwriter and radio host.

== Biography ==
Regowas born on the 21st of May 1964 in São Paulo, Brazil. Since her youth she has been based in Caracas, Venezuela.

== Her beginnings with ES-3 ==
Elisa Rego started her career in music as a singer in various nightspots in Caracas. She was the lead singer in the underground rock group ES-3, a band composed of: Gerardo Ubieda on drums and electronic percussion, Jose Ignacio Martin (a.k.a.: Chuo) on keyboards, Enrique Moros on guitars, Rafael Figlioulo on bass and Elisa as lead vocalist.

ES-3 was a band that became well known in Caracas' musical nights as they did covers of other singers songs, especially covers of songs by Mecano, the Spanish techno-pop group of the 80s. They were so well known for their covers of Mecano that when the Spanish trio visited Venezuela in 1986, the newspaper Últimas Noticias published an article that claimed that "ES-3 made Mecano famous" [sic], referring to the fact that the public was already familiar with the repertoire of the Spanish music group long before they set foot on Venezuelan soil.

ES-3 disintegrated when Elisa began to make preparations to launch her solo singing career, but her first studio album featured some of the musicians from ES-3. The only song on this first solo album in which all the members of ES-3 were present was: "Noche De Fiesta" ("Night of Party"). It was some sort of a farewell song to ES-3.

== Solo career ==
=== First album: Elisa Rego ===
Once separated from ES-3, Gerando Ubieda returned to his band "Témpano", a Venezuelan Prog-Rock band formed in the late 70s, and then becoming an alternative rock band in the late 1980s, and José Ignacio Martín became their keyboardist. In 1988, Elisa signs her first contract with the record label Sonografica with which she records her first studio album, simply titled: Elisa Rego for the characteristics of how it is structured, we can consider it as a mini-album as it only consists of eight songs, unusual thing for the time recording productions, where the LP usually featuring at least ten music themes.

The musical style of the first album can be framed within the techno-rock trend. As the first promotional single on radio extracted the song titled "Libre de ti" ("Free from You"), a song with very good results at the level of public acceptance by the juvenile and contemporary adult target. Following this first hit and after a while, they released the second promotional theme, the song titled "Blanco Y Negro" ("White and Black"), a song that is a classic in the repertoire of the singer, was also the first song she is chosen as the ending theme in some television programs. The third single to be taken from this first album becomes a song entitled "Selva" ("Forest") which is a techno-ballad with a very nice slow and cadenced rhythm with interesting surreal lyrics. It is worth mentioning that "Selva" was the second of two issues of Elisa Rego used as the ending-theme in the soap opera Abigail starring Catherine Fullop and Fernando Carrillo. This song occupied the top positions in the Record Report helping to consolidate her seat of favoritism within radio-listening public taste. The fourth and final single for the radio promotion extracted was "Como tú" ("Like You") a minimalist ballad instrumentally speaking, which had some shooting on the radio, but not with the strength of the first two singles.

In 1989, thanks to the sales success of this first album, Elisa Rego is worthy of several music awards including:

- Ronda Awards, so Artist of the Year by journalists and music critics.
- National Prestige Awards, awarded by the Venezuelan Business Association.

In 1990 Elisa performs concert tours around the country and performs in musical programs in countries such as Puerto Rico, Bolivia, Panama and Colombia, consolidating his international career.

=== Vale La Pena ===
In 1991 she signed a contract with EMI-Venezuela and recorded her second studio album entitled "Vale La Pena" album that... might say, it is far removed from that presented in musical style from her first album. This second album had sounds and atmospheres much more Latino, especially in percussion. The songs remain despite the genre pop songs, they sound much more to salsa music and merengue music. The album contains 10 original songs of which only 3 are ballad-pop strictly speaking, rest of the songs are from middle-tempo and up-tempo with a clear Latino flavor. The album last-trackdisc, "No Le Hables, No Le Llores" (Don't talk to him, don't cry to him) is a song that makes eyes winks to the ballenato-merengue rhythms, although it is neither one nor the other.

As the first promotional single extracted from the album was the song "Mamá No Me Deja" (Mom don't let me) theme which quickly positioned very well on the radio. Another song also sounded in radio is "Ésta Vez" (This Time) a song that is between being a ballad and mid-time, very Latino song. There is also the theme, "Tratando" (Trying of) which it made its respective videoclip. And unofficially, as usual, some broadcasters in radio, they placed on their own, two ballads on the disc are: "Me Pierdo En Tus Ojos" (I get lost in Your Eyes) and, "Por Haberme Olvidado (Te Perdono)" (For Having Forgotten Me [I forgive you]) the latter song, definitely one of the best songs of the whole album, with that typical pop-sound that characterized technological Elisa on her first album. It's one of her lesser-known albums and for many people, and this may be due to the "bad" choice of singles go when doing radio promotion.

=== De Amor Y Deseo ===
Come 1995, Elisa reenters studies recorded in this opportunity and what would become of her third album entitled: "De Amor Y Deseo" (Of Love and Desire) an album with a sound conceptual (whole album) much more pop and less reminiscent of latino-sound when it has to do with percussion sessions, ie, there are no songs that remind you first heard music-salsa, merengue-music; but must clarify that the pop that develops in this new album, not a local-style pop, something easily identifiable with a geographic area, it is the opposite, the songs that comprise this album have more international appearance and timeless... it feels that sound, that innate quality that is characteristic of a work that has been seen that better care (without underestimating previous albums with this) is that it seems an album that was recorded in one of these great recording studios international as Abbey Road, for example.

This disc is removed as first single theme: "Abismo Del Corazón" (Abyss of Heart) (its author, Frank Quintero) which manages to occupy the first place in the radio charts for 15 consecutive weeks. After this single follow hits of "Como A Mi" (Like to Me), "Quiero Estar Contigo" (I Wanna Be with You) a song that is a duet with singer Pedro Castillo (former singer of the group Aditus) and, "Se Derritió Mi Soledad" (It Melted My Loneliness) one of the best ballad songs there in all this work-music, song with interpretation strong by singer.

We should also mention that within the album, there are two covers of high quality: In the first, Elisa made a Spanish version of the item entitled "Everything I Own", a song originally performed by David Gate, renamed in this adaptation that Elisa did as "Cada Día Mucho Más" (Every day More Much) a version where the naked ear it feels the influence of reggae music. And the second cover, this time the song "Groovin'", original of UB-40 group, renamed in Spanish as "Vive, Siente" (Lives, Feels). This album also has 2 bonus tracks and they are these same songs sung in Spanish; but in English this time sung in the voice of Elisa Rego.

=== Temperamental ===
After a recess period of ten years from that she released the "De Amor Y Deseo" album, in 2005, Elisa published her fourth studio album titled "Temperamental" with a sound conceptual latin-pop-fusion. On this album Elisa re-takes one of the most popular songs of Spanish group Mecano, "Aire" (Air) and she makes out of this song, one electronic version.

It should be mentioned that "Aire" is one of the themes Mecano has been special for Elisa Rego, because it was that song that she sang when the discographic label: Sonographic Records, Inc did to her the 'Talent Test' to see what it sounded like her voice into the Study. Another version found in this album is the song "Amándote" (Loving You) theme is originally played by Colina, a Venezuelan singer of pop-reggae-fusion is one of his icon themes. Elisa re-taken one of her old hits included on the first album, techno-ballad "Selva" and re-recorded it again; but in a new version, less tech than the original version and with a rock-acoustic-sound. She makes a version of a song by Venezuelan musician, Frank Quintero, the song "Baila Conmigo" (Dance with Me) and last but not least, Elisa added the album a song sung in English, "Only The Lonely" original group The Motels. The album cover is designed to imitating the cover of Vanidades magazine.

=== Rockola ===
After some recess time, Elisa goes back to the recording studios releases her fifth studio album titled simply "Rockola", an album where the conceptual-theme of the album revolves around re-interpretations of nostalgic songs of all times, songs of Latin American musical-bitter. It's an album where you can notice at first glance, the influences of soul music as well as rhythm & blues, i.e., that typical "Motown Sound", that had a marked influence between the decades of the 1950s and 1960s; but with musical arrangements very contemporary. This album can be said to be a mix between instrumentation of that time while retaining the same time that Latin touch. As the first promotional single from the album was extracted the theme "Nuestro Juramento" (Our Oath) a song originally performed by Julio Jaramillo. Also found in the repertoire of this work-musical themes as: "La Gata Bajo La Lluvia" (The Cat Under Rain) by Rocio Durcal, "Cóncavo Y Convexo" (Concave and Convex) by Roberto Carlos, "Sabor A Nada??" (Flavor to Nothing) by Palito Ortega, "Sombras Nada Más" (Nothing More that Shadows) by Javier Solis, "Mañana Me Iré" (Tomorrow I'll Go Myself) by Los Angeles Negros, "Tú Sabes" (You Know) of Estelita del Llano between others.

In the pre-production of this album, Elisa and her team it took almost two years of preparation... between the research and selection of themes to form part of the repertoire. The album was recorded entirely on analog tape with live musicians into the recording room and after that, the tape was edited digitally, trying as much as possible to preserve the original sound without adding additives of any kind.

The album was launched on 24 September 2009 in a showcase for the media in the Sala del Centro Cultural Corp Banca. The album was released by the label: Anes Records, Inc.

== Discography ==
Studio albums:
1988: Elisa Rego
1991: Vale La Pena
1995: De Amor Y Deseo
2005: Temperamental
2009: Rockola

== Promotional tours and live ==
- Tour "ElisaRego" (1989–90) Venezuela live presentations and promotional tour in music programs (in playback) in Puerto Rico, Bolivia, Panama and Colombia.
- Tour "Valelapena" (details pending).
- Tour "Deamorydeseo" (details pending).
- Tour "Temperamental" (details pending).
- Tour "Rockola" (details pending).

== Official singles chart ==
1. "Libre De Ti" (I Am Free of You).
2. "Blanco Y Negro" (White and Black).
3. "Selva" (Forest).
4. "Como Tú" (Like You).
5. "Mamá No Me Deja" (Mom Will not Let Me).
6. "'Tratando" (Trying of).
7. "Por Haberme Olvidado (Te Perdono)" (For Having Forgotten Me [I Forgive You]).
8. "Vale La Pena" (Worth).
9. "Abismo Del Corazón" (Abyss of the Heart).
10. "Se Derritió Mi Soledad" (It Melted my Loneliness).
11. "Quiero Estar Contigo" (I Want Be You) a duet with Pedro Castillo, ex Aditus.
12. "Como A Mi" (As to Me).
13. "Amándote" (Loving You) originally sung by Colina.
14. "Aire" (Air) originally sung by Mecano.
15. "Sospechas" (Suspicions).
16. "Mañana Y Más" (Tomorrow and More).
17. "Nuestro Juramento" (Our Oath) originally sung by Julio Jaramillo.

=== List outside of her official discography ===
- Nana Cadaviedo and Elisa Rego: "No Hay" (There Is Not) (live version) recorded in live at Teatro Premium, Los Naranjos, Caracas, Venezuela, 10 December 2010.
- Napoleon Pabon and Elisa Rego: "Aferrate A Mi" (Hold on to Me) (rock-ballad song)
- Colina and Elisa Rego: "Mi Calvario" (My Ordeal) (bolero song).
- Colina, Fetu, Marlene Yanez, Maria Rivas and Elisa Rego: "No Puedes Escapar De Mi" (You Can't Escape My) The Colina album: "When a Crazy-man Love", (℗ 1988).
- Elisa Rego for Willie Croes project: "If I Had You", album: "Pecado Original" (Original Sin) (℗ 1998).
- Elisa Rego for Willie Croes project: "Qué Te Pedí" (What Thing I Asked You) triphop-version, in album: "Pecado Original" (Original Sin) (℗ 1998).
- Elisa Rego: "Yo Soy" (I Am) to the project: "Pecado Original".
- Elisa Rego: Song for La Vino Tinto promotion, participate in song various artists: Elisa Rego, Horacio Blanco (Desorden Público vocalist), Chino & Nacho, Kiara, etcetera.
- Elisa Rego: Song for trade "Tecnimueble" in Mérida, Venezuela.
