= Miguel Mas =

Miguel Mas may refer to:

- Miguel Mas (cyclist) (born 1943), Spanish cyclist
- Miguel Mas (actor) (born 1967), Argentinian actor, writer, and director
