= Mi amada Beatriz =

- Genre: Telenovela; Drama; Romance
- Created by: Delia Fiallo
- Based on: Una muchacha llamada Milagros
- Written by: Delia Fiallo; Benilde Ávila; Zaret Romero; Eliseo Morales; Amparo Montalvo
- Directed by: Luis Manzo
- Starring: Catherine Fulop; Miguel Alcántara
- Theme music composer: Luis Guillermo González
- Opening theme: "El hombre que yo amo" by Caridad Canelón
- Country of origin: Venezuela
- Original language: Spanish
- No. of seasons: 1
- No. of episodes: 241

Production
- Executive producer: Arquímedes Rivero
- Producers: Jorge Gherardi; Raúl Li Causi
- Production company: Coral Pictures

Original release
- Network: RCTV
- Release: February 17, 1987 – July 9, 1988

Related
- La dama de rosa; Una muchacha llamada Milagros (1974); Pobre niña rica (1995); Cuidado con el ángel (2008)

Mi amada Beatriz is a Venezuelan telenovela produced by RCTV in 1987 based on the telenovela Una muchacha llamada Milagros written by Delia Fiallo. Starring Catherine Fulop and Miguel Alcántara with the antagonistic participations of Maricarmen Regueiro, Nury Flores, Yanis Chimaras who was replaced by Carlos Cámara Jr., Carolina López and Rosita Vásquez and features the television presentation of Astrid Carolina Herrera.

== Synopsis ==
Beatriz de la Caridad Castañeda (Catherine Fulop) is a very happy and hardworking good girl who was given by her mother Maruja Castañeda (Marisela Berti) to father Amado Quintana (Carlos Márquez) when she was a newborn, because her mother was in danger of death and in order not to leave her daughter helpless, she decides to hand her over to the priest; Beatriz's mother never died and is unaware of her daughter's whereabouts. Beatriz grows up in the care of the priest. One day, when Beatriz is still a teenager, a group of delinquent boys want to play a bad joke on this defenseless girl. They want to scare her and then they try to rape her, one of them is called Arturo Arismendi and is disguised as Dracula. Beatriz can escape this attack, in despair she arrives at the house of a good woman named Miguelina (Rosario Prieto) who, compassionate to the poor girl, allows her to live in her house and becomes like Beatriz's mother. Afterwards she will always have nightmares about that terrible experience and above all she will never forget Dracula's hideous face.

Arturo Andrés Arismendi (Miguel Alcántara) is deeply sorry for the bad action he did in the past, at the same time he sees Beatriz again, but she ignores that Arturo is the man who hurt her and ends up falling in love with him, so Arturo wants to tell Beatriz the whole truth but cannot because he is also in love with her and does not want to lose her. At the same time, two unscrupulous women: Inés Santaella (Nury Flores) and Érika Monasterio Santaella (Maricarmen Regueiro) her niece who is the same age as Beatriz, take advantage of the Castañeda family, making Maruja and Judge Gustavo Adolfo (Marcelo Romo) believe that Érika is the daughter that Maruja gave to her father Loved years ago, they immediately go to live in the Castañeda mansion to take advantage of the deception and, coincidentally, Beatriz also goes to live with the Castañedas, because Maruja wants to educate her, ignoring that Beatriz is her real daughter. In the Castañeda house, Beatriz must deal with the intrigues of bad women, who fear that the truth will be discovered and do everything possible to make Beatriz leave the house, in the same way Beatriz is a victim of the judge's antipathy Castañeda, who rejects her for being an uneducated girl.

In the same way Beatriz and Arturo begin to go out together, but she does not know that Arturo is the same person who caused her so much damage because he is totally different without a mask and Beatriz ends up falling totally in love with him. Meanwhile Arturo's wife disappears and no one knows anything about her anymore and everyone believes her dead, so Beatriz and Arturo can get married. But Beatriz's happiness is very brief, because Arturo, on the first night of their wedding, reveals to the girl his true identity. He apologizes a thousand times for his horrible action, he is sorry and now he tells her that he has changed, that he is a serious, different man and that he is very much in love with her. But she is too angry with him and does not want to hear anything. She doesn't want to see his face anymore because for her he will always be Dracula. Beatriz immediately asks for a divorce because she does not want to live with him. They all ask Beatriz to change her mind, but she doesn't want to see him anymore. The priest also tells Beatriz to forgive her husband, but her pain is stronger than the love she feels for him and she wants to forget him forever.

Meanwhile in Arturo's house, there is a very bad woman, Ofelia (Rosita Vásquez) who is the mother of Arturo's first wife and wants to turn Arturo's daughter against Beatriz and her plan works perfectly. Arturo is in love with Érika who is very bad and ambitious. Beatriz is sad and knows that Arturo is not happy with Érika. She is also in love with a bad man named "El Griego" who wants only to take advantage of her.

After many thoughts and regrets, she is willing to forgive her one great love, Arturo, because she understands that he is now a very good man and is truly in love with her. But her happiness lasts very little because Erika wants to destroy Beatriz and her evil reaches the point of causing an accident to Beatriz so that she is left blind. Érika is immediately taken to an asylum and everyone is very concerned for Beatriz's health. The doctor says that it is very difficult for Beatriz to regain her sight and that only a miracle can save her. Beatriz becomes pregnant and Arturo is always close to her. Beatriz gives birth to a girl but she cannot see her.

Beatriz and Arturo make the decision to marry again because of the church. They marry with their daughter in their arms and Beatriz, while the wedding is taking place, suddenly yells at everyone "VEO!!!, PUEDO VER A MI NIÑA Y A TI, ARTURO!". Everyone is happy and excited and the priest, looking at the Virgin, shouts "ESTO ES UN MILAGRO DE VOSOTROS! GRACIAS VIRGEN SANTA Y GRACIAS SEÑOR!".

== Cast ==
- Catherine Fulop as Beatriz de la Caridad Castañeda
- Maricarmen Regueiro as Érika Monasterio Santaella
- Marcelo Romo as Judge Gustavo Adolfo Castañeda
- Rosario Prieto as Miguelina "Maíta" Paredes
- Astrid Carolina Herrera as Estefanía
- Adolfo Cubas as Miguel Ángel
- Flavio Caballero as Armando
- Carlos Cámara Jr. as El griego
- Miguel Alcántara as Arturo Andrés Arismendi
- Petite Kutlesa as Geraldine Arismendi
- Carlos Márquez as Father Amado Quintana
- Marisela Berti as Maruja Castañeda
- Nury Flores as Inés Santaella
- Marlene Maseda as Brenda Arismendi
- Carolina López as Alida de Arismendi
- Rosita Vásquez as Ofelia
- Marisela Buitrago as Antonieta/Raiza
- Milena Santander León as Enriqueta
- Marco Antonio Casanova as Elisaúl
- Roberto Luque as Héctor Luis "El Jaguar"
- Arturo Calderón as Don Baldomero
- Yanis Chimaras as El griego
- Henry Álvarez as "El Caribe"
- Umberto Buonocuore
- Aidita Artigas Caballero
- Dolores Beltrán as Esperanza
- Estrella Castellanos
- Lourdes Medrano
- Carlos Omaña

== Versions ==
- Una muchacha llamada Milagros produced by Venevisión in 1974
- Pobre niña rica, a Mexican telenovela produced by Televisa in 1995 starring Victoria Ruffo, Ariel López Padilla and Paulina Rubio
- Cuidado con el ángel, a Mexican telenovela produced by Televisa in 2008 starring Maite Perroni and William Levy.
