= Pasionaria (TV series) =

- Genre: Telenovela
- Created by: Vivel Nouel
- Written by: Elizabeth Alezard; María Antonieta Gutiérrez; Fernando Martínez; Abigaíl Truchess; Óscar Urdaneta
- Directed by: Grazio D'Angelo; Édgar Liendo; Arquímedes Rivero
- Starring: Catherine Fulop; Fernando Carrillo; Henry Galue; Yolanda Méndez
- Opening theme: Es el amor by Kiara; Con Mi Cara Tan Lavada by Kiara; Quiero Un Angel by Kiara
- Country of origin: Venezuela
- Original language: Spanish
- No. of episodes: 254

Production
- Executive producer: Omar Pin
- Producers: Carmen Letta; Orlando Rosas; Edgar Liendo
- Production company: Venevisión

Original release
- Network: Venevisión
- Release: 1 March 1990 – 5 March 1991

Related
- Mundo de fieras

Pasionaria is a Venezuelan telenovela written by Vivel Nouel and produced by Venevisión in 1990. Catherine Fulop and Fernando Carrillo starred as the main protagonists with Henry Galue and Yolanda Méndez as the main antagonists. The telenovela was distributed internationally by Venevisión International.

== Synopsis ==
Pasionaria is the story of Barbara and Jesús Alberto. Barbara Santana is a lively and enthusiastic girl, but she suffers from a dark secret that keeps her up at night and gives her no peace; seven years ago, she was the victim of rape and had a child she never saw, as her aunt made her believe the child died while she actually took her to an orphanage. Jesús Alberto is a young, ambitious mechanic with very strong Catholic principles, and he adores his wife and young daughter. When Barbara comes into his life, he is stirred with feelings beyond his control and tries to fight the passion to which he is very attracted. Although Barbara knows he is married, she pursues him and subdues him into an extramarital affair that breaks all the rules. Barbara and Myriam, the wife of Jesús Alberto become close friends, and when she falls sick and is near death, Myriam requests Barbara to remain by her husband's and daughter's side when she will no longer be there. Although Barbara is open, independent and carefree, Jesús Alberto is traditional, methodical and extremely chauvinistic, thereby leading to a clash in their personalities.

== Cast ==
- Catherine Fulop as Barbara Santana de Monteverde
- Fernando Carrillo as Jesus Alberto Tovar Urdaneta
- Andreina Sanchez as Miriam de Tovar
- Elluz Peraza as Elizabeth Montiel
- Henry Galue as Eliseo Monteverde
- Raul Xiques as Ezequiel Santana
- Yolanda Mendez as Nena Duarte de Santana
- Maria Eugenia Domingues as Soledad Duarte
- Vangie Labalan as Virqinia Qiara
- Mahuampi Acosta as Mimina
- Angelica Arenas as Chiquinquira Tovar
- Carlos Arreaza as Quelito
- Ernesto Balzi as Luis Felipe Parra
- Rafael Briceño as Pedro Pedroza
- Marisela Buitriago as Raiza
- Teresa Cardenas as Dianita
- Manuel Carrillo as Pedro Tovar
- Carolina Cristancho as Cherry Gonzalez de la Reca
- Elena Dinisio as Maya Nieves Ibarra
- Francisco Ferrari as Jesus Urdaneta
- Carolina Gentile as Eloisa Monteverde Santana
- Mauricio González as Mauricio González de la Reca
- Mirella Larotonda as Cachita
- Estefania Lopez as Alambrito
- Esperanza Magaz as Renata
- Alberto Marin as Jose Tovar

== See also ==
- List of famous telenovelas
- List of programs broadcast by Venevision
