= Primavera (TV series) =

1987 Venezuelan telenovela

- Genre: Telenovela; Romance; Drama
- Created by: Delia Fiallo
- Written by: Vivel Nouel; Boris Izaguirre; Alberto Gómez
- Directed by: Gabriel Walfenzao
- Starring: Gigi Zanchetta; Fernando Carrillo; Carlota Sosa
- Theme music composer: Luis Guillermo González
- Opening theme: "Pregunta por Ahí" by Willie Colón
- Country of origin: Venezuela
- Original language: Spanish
- No. of episodes: 221

Production
- Executive producer: Daniel Andrade
- Production company: Radio Caracas Television

Original release
- Network: RCTV
- Release: February 12, 1987 – May 4, 1988

Related
- María Teresa (1972); Rosangélica (1993); Rosalinda (1999)

Primavera is a Venezuelan telenovela adapted by Vivel Nouel and produced by RCTV in 1987. It is based on an original story María Teresa written by Cuban writer Delia Fiallo. The series lasted for 221 episodes and was distributed internationally by Coral International.

Gigi Zanchetta and Fernando Carrillo starred as the protagonists. In 1999, Fernando reprised the same role on the Mexican version of the telenovela produced by Televisa.

== Cast ==
- Gigi Zanchetta as Andreína Méndez
- Fernando Carrillo as Eduardo Luis de la Plaza
- Carlota Sosa as Isabela Urbaneja de la Plaza
- Sandra Juhasz as Graciela Méndez
- Humberto García as Luis Alberto Urbaneja
- Pedro Lander as Vladimir Vásquez (Doble V)
- Alberto Marín as Rafael Méndez
- Sebastian Falco as Angel Arismendi
- Carlos Montilla as Salvador González
- Yajaira Orta as Lourdes Falcón
- Marielena Pereira as Valentina Vásquez
- Vladimir Torres as Ernesto París
- Romelia Agüero as Inmaculada González
- Irina Rodríguez as Diana Méndez
- Carmencita Padrón as Alcira
- Zulay García as Yolanda Vivas
- Verónica Doza as Agustina Mendoza
- Dalila Colombo as Augusta Mijares
