= Miss Venezuela 1986 =

33rd edition of the Miss Venezuela competition

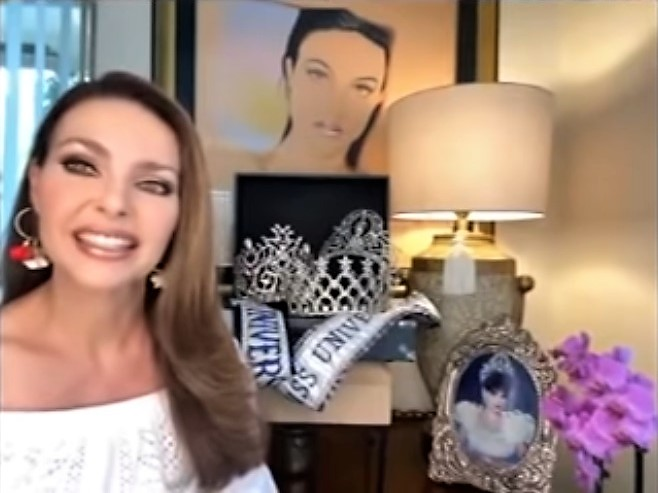
- Bárbara Palacios
- Date: May 9, 1986
- Presenters: Gilberto Correa; Carmen Victoria Pérez
- Entertainment: Melissa; Paul Guillman
- Venue: Teatro Municipal, Caracas, Venezuela
- Broadcaster: Venevision
- Entrants: 24
- Placements: 8
- Winner: Bárbara Palacios; Trujillo

Miss Venezuela 1986 was the 33rd Miss Venezuela pageant, was held in Caracas, Venezuela on May 9, 1986, after weeks of events. The winner of the pageant was Bárbara Palacios, Miss Trujillo.

The pageant was broadcast live on Venevisión from the Teatro Municipal in Caracas. At the conclusion of the final night of competition, outgoing titleholder Silvia Martínez, crowned Bárbara Palacios of Trujillo as the new Miss Venezuela.

== Results ==
=== Placements ===
- Miss Venezuela 1986 - Bárbara Palacios Teyde (Miss Trujillo)
- Miss World Venezuela 1986 - María Begoña Juaristi (Miss Zulia)

The runners-up were:

- 1st runner-up - Nancy Gallardo (Miss Portuguesa)
- 2nd runner-up - Laura Fazzolari (Miss Táchira)
- 3rd runner-up - Maite Delgado (Miss Anzoátegui)
- 4th runner-up - Catherine Fulop (Miss Departamento Vargas)
- 5th runner-up - Raquel Lares (Miss Sucre)
- 6th runner-up - Yoelis Sánchez (Miss Guárico)

=== Special awards ===
- Miss Photogenic (voted by press reporters) - Maite Delgado (Miss Anzoátegui)
- Miss Congeniality - Grizel Herrera (Miss Delta Amacuro)
- Miss Elegance - Nancy Gallardo (Miss Portuguesa)

== Contestants ==
The Miss Venezuela 1986 delegates were:

- Miss Amazonas - Yukency Teresita Sapucki Tovar
- Miss Anzoátegui - Maite Coromoto Delgado González
- Miss Apure - María Luisa Palazón Valverde
- Miss Aragua - Indira Mass Lafont
- Miss Barinas - Betzabeth Emilia Coelles Araujo
- Miss Bolívar - Hilda De Stéfano Fuenmayor
- Miss Carabobo - Lorena María Tosta Jentsch
- Miss Delta Amacuro - Grizel Beatriz Herrera Villegas
- Miss Departamento Libertador - Marisol Ayala Vera
- Miss Departamento Vargas - Catherine Amanda Fulop García
- Miss Distrito Federal - Jackeline Alberdi Villanueva
- Miss Falcón - Leonela Lanz Alvarez
- Miss Guárico - Yoelis Sánchez Azpúrua
- Miss Lara - Laura Schettini Fanelli
- Miss Mérida - Elvira Moreno Rivero
- Miss Miranda - Lucía Carolina Perpetuo González
- Miss Monagas - María Carolina Pacheco
- Miss Nueva Esparta - Clara Catherine Taormina Severino
- Miss Portuguesa - Nancy Josefina Gallardo Quiñones
- Miss Sucre - Raquel Teresa Lares Rivero
- Miss Táchira - Laura Inés Fazzolari Scurria
- Miss Trujillo - Bárbara Palacios Teyde
- Miss Yaracuy - Alicia Lammensdorf Beliauskaite
- Miss Zulia - María Begoña Juaristi Mateo
