= Una muchacha llamada Milagros =

- Genre: Telenovela; Romance
- Created by: Delia Fiallo
- Directed by: Orangel Delfin
- Starring: Rebeca Gonzalez; José Bardina; José Luis Rodríguez
- Opening theme: "Una muchacha llamada Milagros" by Rudy Márquez
- Country of origin: Venezuela
- Original language: Spanish
- No. of episodes: 229

Production
- Executive producer: José Enrique Crousillat
- Production company: Venevisión

Original release
- Network: Venevisión
- Release: September 10, 1973 – August 13, 1974

Related
- Mi amada Beatriz (1987); Cuidado con el ángel (2008); Tóc Rối (2019)

Una muchacha llamada Milagros (English: A girl called Milagros) is a Venezuelan telenovela written by Delia Fiallo and produced by Venevisión in 1974.

Rebeca Gonzalez and José Bardina starred as the main protagonists with Ivonne Attas and Haydee Balza as antagonists.

== Plot ==
Juan Miguel Saldivar is a prestigious psychiatrist who has dedicated his time to the rehabilitation of young rebels and criminals. This serves as a distraction from his failing marriage to his wife Viviana and a rape he committed during his youth while he was drunk. But fate will bring him face to face with Milagros, the girl whom he raped several years prior, though Milagros does not remember him. In order to assist with her rehabilitation, Juan Miguel takes Milagros to the house of Judge Clemente Ruiz, a very strict man. Cecilia, the judge's wife, welcomes Milagros with open arms, but she receives a cold welcome from her daughter Monica.

While on a trip overseas, Viviana, Dr. Saldivar's wife, is involved in a terrible accident and she is reported to be dead. Seeing the perfect opportunity, Monica, who has been secretly in love with Juan Miguel, plans on seducing him so that he can marry her, but she discovers that Juan Miguel is in love with Milagros. She accuses Milagros of theft, and in order to save her, Juan Miguel proposes to Milagros. But fate intervenes when on their wedding night, Milagros realizes that the man she married is the same one who raped her years earlier.

== Cast ==
- Rebeca González as Milagros
- José Bardina as Juan Miguel Saldivar
- Haydee Balza as Mónica Ruiz
- José Luis Rodríguez "El Puma" as Omar Contreras "El Puma"
- Ivonne Attas as Irene y Giovanna D'Orsini
- José Luis Silva as Amado
- Esperanza Magaz as Candelaria
- Hilda Breer as Luisa
- Reneé de Pallás as Onelia
- Nury Flores as Viviana
- Alejandra Pinedo as Candy
- José Oliva as Clemente Ruiz
- Eva Blanco as Cecilia
- Elena Farías as Sonia
- Francia Ortiz as Lili
- Suyin Rosa as Mayita
- Betty Ruth as Lucrecia
- Luis Abreu as Augusto
- Caridad Canelón as Purita
- Ana Castell as Olvido
- Humberto García as Nelson
- Lucila Herrera as Clemencia
- Oscar Mendoza as Rene
- Néstor Zavarce as Emilio
- Francisco Ferrari as Francisco
- Fernando Flores as Eloy
- Chela D'Gar as Doña Gloria
- Graciela Lopez as Manuela
- Francisco Moreno as Segismundo
- Hugo Pimentel as El Piraña
- Chumico Romero as Suky
- Carlos Subero as Padre Antonio
- Soledad Rojas as Rita
