= Cuidado con el ángel (2008 TV series) =

Mexican telenovela

- Genre: Telenovela; Romance; Drama
- Created by: Delia Fiallo
- Based on: Una muchacha llamada Milagros by Delia Fiallo
- Written by: Carlos Romero
- Directed by: Víctor Manuel Fouilloux; Victor Rodriguez
- Starring: Maite Perroni; William Levy; Helena Rojo; Ana Patricia Rojo; Laura Zapata; Nailea Norvind; Ricardo Blume; Rocío Banquells; René Strickler; Michelle Vieth; Víctor Noriega; Evita Muñoz "Chachita"
- Theme music composer: Jorge Eduardo Murguia; Mauricio Lopez Arriaga
- Opening theme: Solo Tú performed by La Nueva Banda Timbiriche and Gaby Sánchez "Pangako Ko" by OJ Mariano (Philippines)
- Country of origin: Mexico
- Original language: Spanish
- No. of episodes: 194

Production
- Executive producer: Nathalie Lartilleux
- Producer: Leticia Díaz
- Production locations: Filming; Televisa San Ángel; Mexico City, Mexico; Locations; Mexico City, Mexico; Zona del Pedregal, Ixtapaluca, Mexico
- Cinematography: Jesus Acuna Lee; Adrian Frutos
- Editors: Alfredo Frutos Maza; Pablo Peralta
- Camera setup: Multi-camera
- Running time: 30 minutes
- Production company: Televisa

Original release
- Network: Canal de las Estrellas
- Release: June 9, 2008 – March 6, 2009

Related
- Una muchacha llamada Milagros (1974)

Cuidado con el ángel (English title: Careful with The Angel; lit. Be Careful with the Angel) is a Mexican telenovela produced by Nathalie Lartilleux for Televisa in 2008. It is an adaptation of the Venezuelan telenovela, Una muchacha llamada Milagros produced in 1974 by Venevisión. Each episode garnered nearly 5 million viewers daily.

On June 9, 2008, Canal de las Estrellas started broadcasting Cuidado con el ángel weekdays at 4:00pm, replacing Al diablo con los guapos. The last episode was broadcast on March 6, 2009 with Atrévete a soñar replacing it.

On July 6, 2009, ABS-CBN started broadcasting in the Philippines as Maria de Jesus: Ang Anghel sa Lansangan weekdays at 3:30pm (then moved to 4:00pm and later 4:15pm). The last episode was broadcast on April 9, 2010.

Univision started broadcasting Cuidado con el ángel on September 22, 2008 weeknights at 8pm/7c, replacing Al diablo con los guapos. The last episode was broadcast on July 6, 2009 with En nombre del amor replacing it on July 7, 2009. Univision reruns Cuidado con el ángel from October 22, 2012 to July 19, 2013 replacing Sortilegio weekdays at 2pm/1c. The last episode was broadcast on July 19, 2013 with Cachito de cielo replacing it on July 22, 2013.

Maite Perroni and William Levy starred as protagonists.

Ana Patricia Rojo, Arturo Carmona, Rocío Banquells, Laura Zapata, Nailea Norvind, and Michelle Vieth starred as antagonists.

The leading actors Helena Rojo, Ricardo Blume, and Evita Muñoz "Chachita" starred as stellar performances.

== Plot ==
María de Jesus, better known as Marichuy, is a humble young girl living with Candelaria, a laundress who gave her a home when she was wandering on the streets. Candelaria is like a mother to Marichuy because she never met her biological mother as she was left in an orphanage when she was a baby. The abandonment has led her to believe her mother never loved her. Marichuy's biological mother, Cecilia Velarde, entrusted her baby to a priest, named Father Anselmo, who took the baby to an orphanage, after she thought she was dying. Now, she regrets making that decision and has spent most of her life searching for her lost child.

Marichuy also hides a horrible secret. At the age of 14, Marichuy ran away from the orphanage, and began to live on the streets, doing her best to survive. One night, she was attacked by a drunk man. She cannot seek justice for what happened to her because she did not see the man's face very well since she was attacked late at night. This experience, as well as having terrible recurrent nightmares, leaves her with a deep resentment towards men.

Juan Miguel San Román is a prestigious psychiatrist who has dedicated his time to the rehabilitation of young rebels and criminals. This serves as a distraction from his failing marriage to his wife Viviana and a horrible crime he committed during his youth while he was drunk. Once again, destiny brings Juan Miguel and Marichuy together when she is arrested with a group of friends. From that point, he vows to help Marichuy and he takes her to Judge Patricio Velarde's home, a very strict, heartless man, who is also her biological father.

As soon as Marichuy steps foot into the house, Cecilia welcomes her with open arms, but Judge Patricio despises her from the start due to her lack of manners. She also is not well received by the Velarde's daughter, Estefanía and her aunt, Isabela. Estefanía is not the Velarde's real daughter. She and her aunt schemed up a plan to have Cecilia believe that she had found her daughter, that way, they would both move into their mansion and not live in poverty anymore.

Eventually, Marichuy and Juan Miguel fall in love and get married. On their wedding night, Marichuy has the same nightmare, but this time she is able to recognize the man's face who is Juan Miguel, the love of her life. Marichuy runs out of the hotel room, devastated. Juan Miguel runs after her and tries to calm her. She apologizes but Juan Miguel confesses that her nightmares were, indeed, true. This enrages Marichuy and she runs off again and takes a bus back to Mexico City.

The next stage of the novela is Juan Miguel constantly begging Marichuy to forgive him and she rejecting him. She later finds out she is pregnant and decides to forgive him. It turns out however, that Juan Miguel's first wife Viviana is still alive and she returns pretending to have lost her memory. Juan Miguel, thinking Marichuy came to beg him for a divorce instead of coming to forgive him, screams about Viviana's return before Marichuy has a chance to speak. Devastated, Marichuy leaves and hides out in a farm for a while.

Then begins the third stage of the novela. This stage consists of the pregnant Marichuy hiding out in a farm of guy named Omar (better known as Leopardo) while taking a fake name of Lirio. While she is in the farm Leopardo falls in love with Lirio (really Marichuy) and she agrees to marry him, and she has Juan Miguel's kid. Everything appears to be going well for Marichuy. Meanwhile, Juan Miguel is missing Marichuy and is taking care of his supposedly memory-lost wife, Viviana. He hires a nanny, Blanca, to take care of his daughter Mayita. Blanca turns out to have multiple personality disorders and her other personality, Ivette, stabs Viviana, killing her. Juan Miguel takes the blame for the murder so as to help Blanca. When Marichuy learns of his imprisonment in the newspaper, she decides to go back, standing Leopardo up before their wedding, to help Juan Miguel. However, Juan Miguel gets freed since Blanca confesses it was her (or at least kinda her since it was her other personality Ivette). He decides to marry Blanca in order to help her and make her feel supported.

Marichuy gets back but discovers Juan Miguel is engaged to Blanca and is heartbroken. She knows she lost Leopardo for coming back to help Juan Miguel so she doesn't know what to do and decides to pursue acting (having previously acted before hiding out in the farm). She starts working as a theater actress to support herself and her child, as well as Candelaria. Leopardo comes looking for her and it turns out he is friends with Juan Miguel and they talk about their great love for a woman not knowing it is the same woman. At some point, they discover Marichuy and Lirio are the same woman and Juan Miguel discovers he has a son with Marichuy. Many things happen but at the end of this stage of the novela, Leopardo and Blanca get together and Marichuy goes blind after a bullet hits her in her head. Luckily, she doesn't die.

Unfortunately, this is not enough for Marichuy and Juan Miguel to finally get together. Many other things happens in the novela, like; Marichuy losing her kid, Marichuy finding out she is a Velarde and forgiving her parents (after many episodes of hating them), Juan Miguel becoming an eye surgeon, Juan Miguel pretending to be someone else to be close to Marichuy since she is blind, and Juan Miguel giving Marichuy her sight back through a surgery. At the end, Juan Miguel and Marichuy finally get married again, living happily ever after with their two kids.

== Cast ==
=== Main ===
- Maite Perroni as María de Jesus "Marichuy" Velarde Santos de San Román
- William Levy as Juan Miguel San Román Bustos/Pablo Cisneros
- Helena Rojo as Cecilia Santos de Velarde
- Ana Patricia Rojo as Estefania Rojas/Estefania Velarde Santos
- Laura Zapata as Onelia Montenegro
- Nailea Norvind as Viviana Mayer Montenegro de San Román
- Michelle Vieth as Ana Julia Villaseñor
- Ricardo Blume as Patricio Velarde del Bosque
- Victor Noriega as Daniel Velarde
- Rocio Banquells as Isabella Rojas
- René Strickler as Omar "El Leopardo" Contreras
- Miguel Córcega as Padre Anselmo Vidal #1
- Héctor Gómez as Padre Anselmo Vidal #2
- Evita Muñoz "Chachita" as Candelaria Martínez
- Arturo Carmona as Amador Robles

=== Supporting ===
- Maya Mishalska as Blanca Silva de Contreras/Ivette Dorleaque
- Sherlyn as Rocio San Román Bustos de Velarde
- África Zavala as Elsa Maldonado San Román Vda. de Acuña
- Abraham Ramos as Adrián González
- Jorge da Silva as Eduardo Garibay
- Georgina Salgado as Purificación "Purita" Camacho de González
- Elizabeth Dupeyrón as Luisa San Román de Maldonado
- Óscar Traven as Francisco Maldonado
- Carlos Cámara Jr. as Inspector Cimarro
- Francisco Rubio as Rafael Cimarro
- Renata Flores as Martirio
- Rodrigo Mejia as Nelson Acuña
- Ana Isabel Corral as Beatríz de Garibay
- Jesús Moré as Vicente
- Mauricio Mejía as Israel Pérez
- Kelly Kellerman as Rebeca "Becky" Mendoza de Pérez
- Saraí Meza as María Antonieta "Mayita" San Roman Mayer
- Hish Alexis as Juan Miguel "Juanito" San Román Velarde
- Sara Montes as Balbina
- Beatriz Monroy as Casilda López
- Rebeca Manríquez as Olga
- Beatriz Aguirre as Mariana Bustos de San Román
- Amparo Garrido as Clemencia
- Vania Pardo as Dora

=== Guest stars ===
- María Dolores Oliva as Coralia
- Lucía Pailles as Chona
- Norma Reyna as Mother Carmela
- Edgardo Eliezer as Burny Smith
- María Morena as Esther
- Maite Embil as Leticia de Lizárraga
- Archie Lanfranco as Gustavo Lizárraga
- Luis Caballero as Gabriel Lizárraga
- Diana Golden as Mercedes
- Rafael del Villar as Tomás
- Alejandro Ruiz as Lic. Del Villar
- Patricio Borghetti as Pato
- Marina Marín as Micaela Vidal
- Justo Martínez as Cosme
- Albert Chávez as Nacho
- Adrián Martiñón as El Piraña
- Sebastián Dopazo as Humberto Tinoco
- Mario Casillas as Lic. Lozada
- David Rencoret as Lic. del Villar
- Luis Bayardo as Judge
- Jorge de Marin as Public Prosecutor
- Ramón Cabrer as Himself
- Eduardo Rivera as Doctor in Red Cross
- Aurora Clavel as Fermina
- Maricarmen Vela as Doña Mimí
- Teo Tapia as Dr. Duran
- Sergio DeFassio as Beto
- Delia Casanova as Sra. Márgara Riquelme
- Juan Ángel Esparza as Reynaldo Iturbe

== Remake ==
The show was adapted to a Vietnamese drama called "Tóc rối" (English: Tangled Hair).

== Soundtrack ==
1. Solo Tu (La Nueva Banda Timbiriche)
2. Esta Soledad (Maite Perroni)
3. Contigo (Maite Perroni)
4. Separada De Ti (Maite Perroni)
5. Ave Maria (Maite Perroni)
6. Y No Sé Que Pasó (Angels)
7. Si Tu No Vuelves (Miguel Bosé)
8. Lejos Estamos Mejor (Motel)
9. Niño (Belanova)
10. No Me Quiero Enamorar (Kalimba)
11. Un Dos Un Dos Tres (El Simbolo)
12. Digale (David Bisbal)
13. Caricia De Mi Alma (Maya Mishalska)
14. Perdon (Alejandro y Vicente Fernandez)
15. La Gota Fria (Carlos Vives)
16. La Fuerza Del Corazo (Alejandro Sanz)
17. Una Mujer Salvaje (Grupo Luz Eterna)
18. Vete Ya (Valentin Elizalde)

== Awards and nominations ==
Year	Award	Category	Nominee	Result
2008	TV Adicto Golden Awards	Female Revelation	Maite Perroni	Won
2008	TV Adicto Golden Awards	Male Revelation	William Levy	Won
2008	TV Adicto Golden Awards	Best Couple	Maite Perroni and William Levy	Won
2009	27th TVyNovelas Awards	Best Telenovela of the Year	Nathalie Lartilleux	Nominated
2009	27th TVyNovelas Awards	Best Young Lead Actress	Maite Perroni	Won
2009	27th TVyNovelas Awards	Best First Actress	Helena Rojo	Won
2009	27th TVyNovelas Awards	Best Original Story or Adaptation	Delia Fiallo	Nominated
2009	27th TVyNovelas Awards	Best Direction	Víctor Manuel Fouilloux; Víctor Rodríguez	Nominated
2009	Premios Juventud	What a Hottie!	William Levy	Won
2009	Premios Juventud	Girl of my Dreams	Maite Perroni	Won
2009	Reina de las Telenovelas	Best Actress	Maite Perroni	Won
2009	Premios People en Español	Best Telenovela	Nathalie Lartilleux	Nominated
2009	Premios People en Español	Best Actress	Maite Perroni	Nominated
2009	Premios People en Español	Best Actor	William Levy	Nominated
2009	Premios People en Español	Best Villain	Laura Zapata	Nominated
2009	Premios People en Español	Best Couple	Maite Perroni and William Levy	Nominated
2009	Premios People en Español	Best Remake	Nathalie Lartilleux	Nominated

== International broadcast ==
It was broadcast in Indonesia on Global TV in 2009, was dubbed in Bahasa Indonesia by the title Marichuy.
