= Abigail (TV series) =

Venezuelan television series

- Genre: Telenovela
- Created by: Inés Rodena
- Written by: Inés Rodena; Alberto Gómez; Amparo Montalva; María Helena Portas; Elizabeth Alezart
- Directed by: Tito Rojas
- Starring: Catherine Fulop; Fernando Carrillo
- Theme music composer: Pedro Pardo
- Opening theme: De Carne y Hueso
- Country of origin: Venezuela
- Original language: Spanish
- No. of seasons: 1
- No. of episodes: 257

Production
- Executive producers: Arquímedes Rivero; Luis Francisco Peraza
- Producers: Carmen Cecilia Urbaneja; Luis Francisco Peraza; Carmen Setta
- Editor: Alberto Ponte
- Production company: Coral Pictures

Original release
- Network: RCTV
- Release: October 4, 1988 – July 8, 1989

Abigail is a Venezuelan telenovela that was produced by and seen on Venezuela's Radio Caracas Televisión between 1988 and 1989. It was written by Elizabeth Alezard, Alberto Gómez, Mariana Luján, Amparo Montalva, and María Helena Portas and directed by Tito Rojas. This telenovela lasted 257 episodes and was distributed internationally by RCTV International. Starring Catherine Fulop and Fernando Carrillo. The antagonist is Hilda Abrahamz.

== Synopsis ==
It tells the story of the capricious Abigail Guzmán (Catherine Fulop) the only daughter of a wealthy businessman, beautiful and troubled, who falls in love with Professor Carlos Alfredo Ruiz Aponte (Fernando Carrillo) who teaches her literature classes at the San Lázaro school. Abigail manages to conquer professor Carlos Alfredo and they immediately have a son, whom she gives to an unknown taxi driver in a moment of mental delirium. Abigail will fight for many years to get her son back and to regain the love of Carlos Alfredo, whom she blames for the loss of her child. His son, Cheíto, will reappear years later one day when, out of necessity, he breaks into Abigaíl's mansion. Abigail will also have to deal with the twin sisters, María Clara (Hilda Abrahamz) and María Begoña (Hilda Abrahamz) who try to take away her love. The story will be an odyssey of a love that will overcome a wrong marriage, a crisis of madness, a son, some strange parents, until the happy union of Abigail and Carlos Alfredo.

== Cast ==
- Catherine Fulop as Abigail Guzmán de Ruiz
- Fernando Carrillo as Prof. Carlos Alfredo Ruiz Aponte
- Hilda Abrahamz as María Clara Martínez/María Begoña Martínez
- Roberto Moll as Álvaro dos Santos Ortiz
- Astrid Carolina Herrera as Amanda Riquelme
- Adolfo Cubas as Leonel Santana
- Inés María Calero as Bárbara Urdaneta
- Crisol Carabal as Rosario "Charito" Santana
- Ileana Jacket as Estrella Monsalve
- Karl Hoffman as Daniel Morales
- Gledys Ibarra as Pastora
- América Barrios as Madre Teresa
- Rosita Vásquez as Berta Aponte Vda. de Ruiz
- Guillermo Ferrán as Guillermo Guzmán
- Carmen Alicia Mora as Ana Leónidas Guzmán
- Omaira Coromoto Rivero as Susana Pérez
- Sandra Juhasz as Matilde Izaguirre
- Estrella Castellanos as Rita Monsalve
- Zulay García as Lucía Martínez
- Virginia Urdaneta as Carlota Martínez
- Manuel Carrillo as Carlos Alfredo "Cheíto" Martínez/Carlos Alfredo "Cheíto" Ruiz Guzmán
- Hylene Rodríguez as Mariana Ruiz Guzmán
- Dalila Colombo as Rosalba Maldonado
- Romelia Agüero as Blanca Cabrera
- Marisela Buitrago as Viviana López
- Helianta Cruz as Mónica Salvatierra
- Antonio Machuca as Jean Louis René Goduón
- Aidita Artigas as Balbina López
- Gabriela Gerbes as Silvia Oropeza
- Rita De Gois as Prof. Ninoska Sepúlveda
- Domingo del Castillo as Joaquín Martínez
- Manuel Gassol as Prof. José Rafael Pereira
- Alejandro Delgado as Dr. Freddy Avellaneda
- Laura Brey as Sonia "La Malvaloca" Ibarra
- Ricardo García as Marcos "El Látigo" Rodríguez
- Marcial Coronado as Joao
- Elio Pietrini as Rubén
- Katherina Sperka as Tatiana
- Vicky Franco as Leandra
- Dolores Beltrán as Javiera
- Zuleima González as Pamela
- Alexander Montilla as Fernando
- Lolymar Sánchez as Zulayta
- Ileana Alomá as Elizabeth
- Bonnie Morín as Julia
- Carmen Landaeta as Ruperta
- Roberto Luque as León Felipe
- Vanessa as Sandra
- Ignacio Navarro as Gaitán
- Lourdes Medrano as Maruca
- Evelyn Berroterán as Chela
- Dante Carlé as Father Agustín
- Felipe Mundarain as Commissar Bressanutti
- Nelson Segre as Insp. Camacho
- Leonardo Oliva as Prof. Oropeza
- María del Pilar as Dir. Arismendi
- Iraima Díaz as Lolita

== Theme song ==
The theme songs to Abigail were:

1. De carne y hueso - Pedro Pardo.

2. Selva - Elisa Rego (author: Jose Ignasio Martin).

3. Blanco y Negro Elisa Rego (author: Jose Ignasio Martin).

4. Ya no hay más que hablar María Jimena Pereira (author: Carlos Nilsson, Argentina Broadcast Telefe)
