= Güido Lombardi =

Peruvian journalist, lawyer, and politician

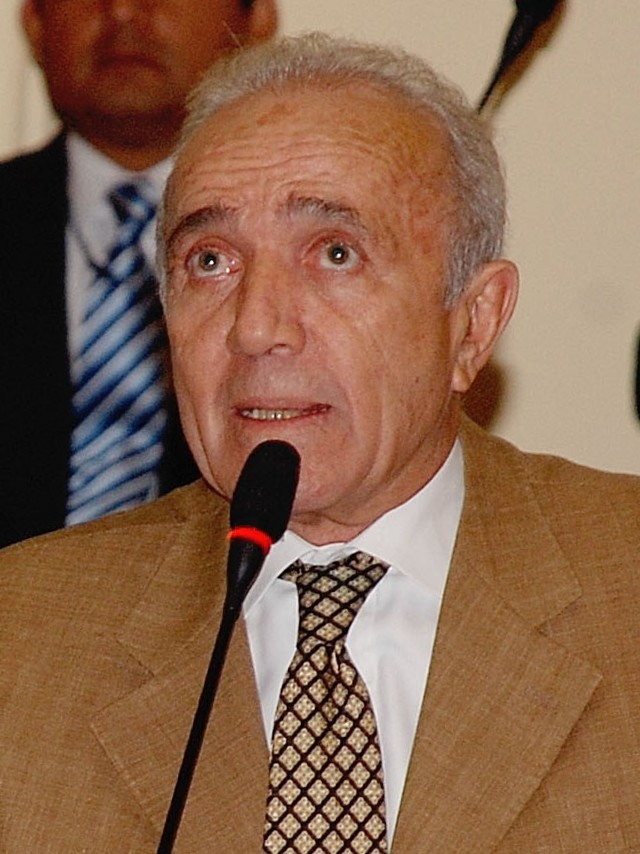
- Güido Lombardi in 2011

Member of Congress
- In office July 26, 2016 – September 30, 2019
- Constituency: Lima
- In office July 26, 2006 – July 26, 2011
- Constituency: Lima

Personal details
- Born: December 9, 1949 (age 76) Tacna, Peru
- Party: Independent
- Other political affiliations: National Unity (non-affiliated); Peruvians for Change (non-affiliated)
- Domestic partner: Patricia del Río
- Education: Pontifical Catholic University of Peru (LLB)
- Occupation: Journalist
- Profession: Lawyer

Güido Ricardo Lombardi Elías (born 9 December 1949) is a Peruvian journalist, lawyer, and politician of Italian descent.

== Career ==
Since 1984, he has conducted radio programs, both on Radio Programs del Peru and on Radio Nacional del Peru. In 1990, he was the moderator of the first presidential debate in the history of Peru, a debate between Mario Vargas Llosa (FREDEMO) and Alberto Fujimori (C90). In 2002, he is a regular columnist for Diario Perú.21 broadcast in Lima. He has also worked at Panamericana Televisión as host of the journalistic program Panorama.

He is a well-known radio host, as a political critic and host of various programs, he most remembered for hosting in 2001, the program ¿Quién quiere ser millonario?.

In 2001, he led the second presidential debate in Peruvian history: Alejandro Toledo (PP) against Alan García (APRA) for the 2001 general elections.

== Political career ==
At the beginning of the nineties, he worked as Coordinator of Promotion and Dissemination of the Instituto Libertad y Democracia chaired by Hernando de Soto.

In 2005, he was invited by Lourdes Flores to head the list of National Unity to the Andean Parliament. However, his quota was filled by Rafael Rey, so he was instead selected to run in the congressional list for Lima. He was elected as Congressman of the Republic by National Unity, being the third most voted in the coalition.

He currently works as a professor at ESAN University, teaching the Globalization and National Reality course.
