= Soledad Onetto =

Chilean TV presenter (born 1976)

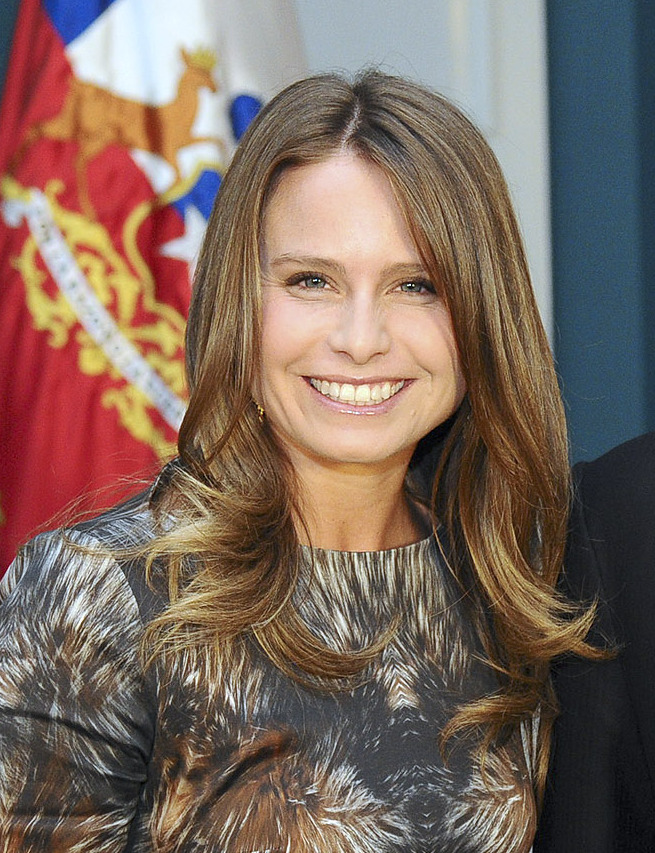
Onetto in 2012.

Maria Soledad Onetto (born July 27, 1976 in Santiago, Chile) is a Chilean TV presenter. She is a journalism graduate from the Pontifical Catholic University of Chile, news reader and TV host Chile. She is married to Rodrigo Alonso.

Awards and achievements
Preceded by Tonka Tomicic and Sergio Lagos	Viña del Mar International Song Festival presenters (with Felipe Camiroaga); 2009-2010	Succeeded by Eva Gómez and Rafael Araneda
