= Rosalinda Serfaty =

Argentine-born Venezuelan actress

- Born: Rosalinda Raquel Serfaty Rosenstock; April 24, 1965 (age 59); Buenos Aires, Argentina
- Occupation: Actress

Rosalinda Raquel Serfaty Rosenstock (born April 24, 1965, in Buenos Aires) is an Argentine-born Venezuelan television and theater actress of Moroccan Jewish and Berber Moroccan origin.

== Biography ==
Rosalinda was born to Jewish parents Jaime Serfaty, her father, and mother, Mina Rosenstock. Her family moved to Venezuela from Argentina when she was 7 years old. Her artistic career began when she was about to finish high school when she enrolled in Escuela de Danza Contemporánea de Caracas (Caracas School of Contemporary Dance). While pursuing her artistic career, she continued her studies in Social Communication at the Universidad Católica Andrés Bello. While at university, she began doing modeling jobs in order to help out with her finances and studies.

After trying to get on television, her first acting role came in 1989 as the protagonist of the telenovela produced by Venevisión titled La Revancha. Her next acting role was playing the villain in the telenovela Mundo de Fieras on the same channel.

== Personal life ==
In 1993, Rosalinda and her husband Ayush Benzaquen welcomed their first child, a daughter named Corina, and in 1996, they had another daughter named Ariana.

== Filmography ==
- 1989: La Revancha as Isamar
- 1991: Mundo de Fieras as Jocelyn Palacios Anzola de Sartori Bustamante
- 1994: Peligrosa as Elisa
- 1998: Luz María as Angelina Mendoza y Rivero de Gonzalvez
- 2000: Amantes de Luna Llena as Valentina Linares
- 2001: La niña de mis ojos as Camila Olivares Sucre
- 2003: La invasora as Alicia Fuentes Manso
- 2004: Sabor a ti as Andreína Obregón
- 2005: Con toda el alma as Ana Cecilia
- 2009: ¡Qué Clase de Amor! as Ana María Sosa
- 2011: Natalia del Mar as Irene Lopez
- 2012: Mi ex me tiene ganas as Claudia
