= Felipe Camiroaga =

Chilean TV presenter and actor

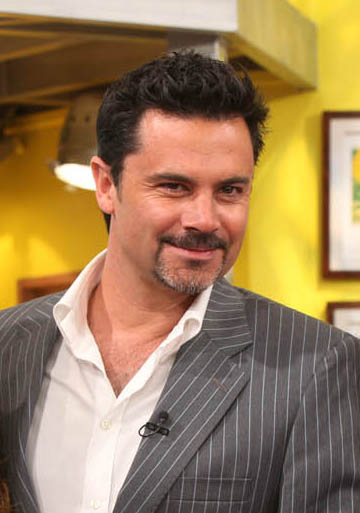
- Felipe Camiroaga in 2009
- Born: Felipe Humberto Camiroaga Fernández; 8 October 1966; Santiago, Chile
- Died: 2 September 2011 (aged 44); Juan Fernández Archipelago, Chile
- Resting place: Parque del Recuerdo
- Other name: El Halcón de Chicureo (The Falcon of Chicureo)
- Occupations: Television presenter, actor
- Years active: 1988—2011

Felipe Humberto Camiroaga Fernández (8 October 1966 – 2 September 2011) was a Chilean television presenter, actor and comedian, one of the most popular in his country.

Camiroaga hosted many shows for Chilean television station TVN, including the morning talk show Buenos Días a Todos and a late-night talk show Animal Nocturno. He also acted in several TV series, such as Jaque Mate and Rojo y Miel, and in two films. Camiroaga twice hosted the Viña del Mar International Song Festival in 2009 and 2010. He was nicknamed "Halcón de Chicureo" ("Falcon of Chicureo") because he bred falcons in his residence in Chicureo, a rural area north of Santiago.

Camiroaga died on 2 September 2011 after the military plane which was taking him and twenty others to Juan Fernández Archipelago crashed in the sea. Camiroaga's death was officially announced seven days later, and after a funeral oration at TVN's headquarters, he was buried in Santiago. He has been posthumously awarded several prizes, including the "Social Communicator Special Award" by the National Council of Television in 2011.

== Early life and studies ==
Camiroaga was born in Santiago, Chile. His parents were Jorge Camiroaga Puch and María de la Luz Fernández Stemann; he was the second of three brothers. Camiroaga and Fernández separated when Felipe was four years old. His mother moved to the Canary Islands in Spain, leaving her children with their father. In the Canary Islands, Fernández married Fernando Bontempi, with whom she had three children, including Spanish actress Paola Bontempi. Camiroaga was of Basque, German, and Peruvian descent; he traced his Peruvian ancestry to his paternal grandmother Irene Puch de Olazábal, who was born in Arequipa. Camiroaga's German ancestry is traced to his mother and paternal grandmother. His paternal grandfather was Carabineros de Chile colonel Humberto Camiroaga, Director of the Escuela de Carabineros de Chile.

During his childhood, Camiroaga regularly visited rural places such as Villa Alegre, where his aunt Lavinia "Mirnia" Camiroaga lived, and Robinson Crusoe Island, which influenced his interest in animals and the countryside. In 1981, while spending his vacations at the Juan Fernández Archipelago, Camiroaga offered to work as a camera assistant for a TV crew from Televisión Nacional de Chile that was on location; this was his first interaction with television. Camiroaga was named an "Illustrious Son" of Villa Alegre in May 2011.

Camiroaga completed his primary studies at Colegio San Ignacio de El Bosque, and his secondary studies at Colegio Marshall. In 1987, he completed studies in TV production and direction at Instituto Incacea. He also studied journalism at Las Condes University, but did not complete the course, and theater at Academia de Actuación Fernando González Mardones.

== Career in television ==
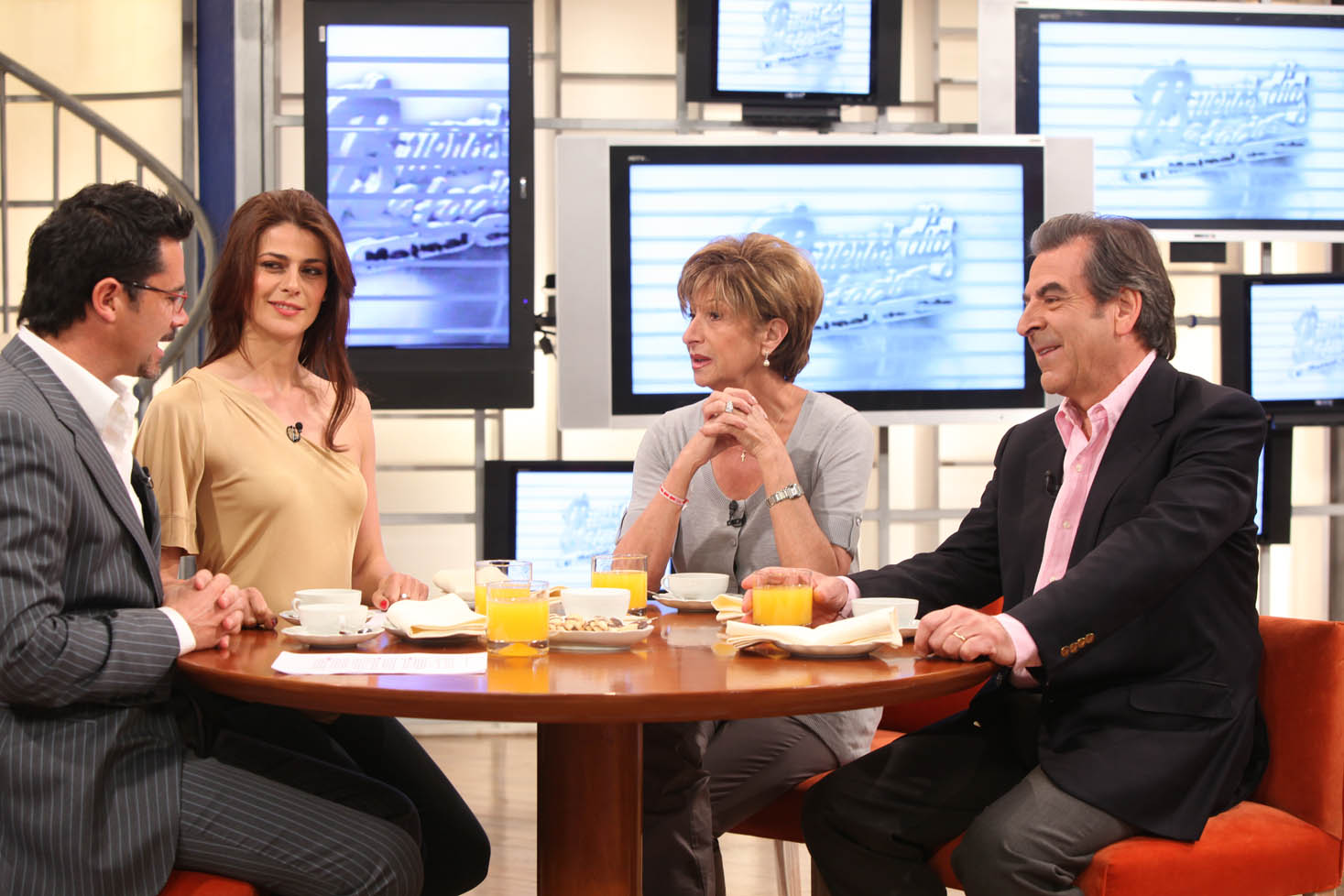
Camiroaga (left) in Buenos Días a Todos with Tonka Tomicic, Marta Larraechea and Eduardo Frei Ruiz-Tagle in 2009.

Felipe Camiroaga started working as a camera assistant at the press department of television channel Red de Televisión Universidad de Chile (RTU, now Chilevisión) in 1988, and later as a production assistant at the channel's production department. But he quickly went from off to on-camera; his first job was as a host in a music video programme called Videotop, that was previously hosted by Pablo Aguilera and Justus Liebig. Later, he presented Extra Jóvenes, RTU's teenage-oriented show, which he co-hosted with Katherine Salosny. His chemistry with Salosny proved successful and he became her co-host a few months later. In 1991 he declined an offer to become a news anchor and continued at Extra Jóvenes, now co-presenting with Claudia Conserva.

Camiroaga was hired by Televisión Nacional de Chile (TVN) in 1992 to co-host Buenos Días a Todos with Tati Penna, a breakfast programme first transmitted that year; however, the couple were later replaced by Margot Kahl and Jorge Hevia. Later, he had a brief television acting career, debuting in Jaque Mate, and later he portrayed an antagonistic character in Rojo y Miel. Despite being advised by actress Ana Reeves, Camiroaga did not receive good reviews for his acting performances.

At the same time, he hosted some unsuccessful programmes, such as La Gran Apuesta and El Chapuzón, and others with mixed results, such as Motín a Bordo and Contigo en Verano. However, at the end of the 1990s, he achieved success with prime time programme La Noche del Mundial, which was broadcast during the 1998 FIFA World Cup, and Pase lo que Pase, a miscellaneous evening programme which he co-hosted with Karen Doggenweiler.

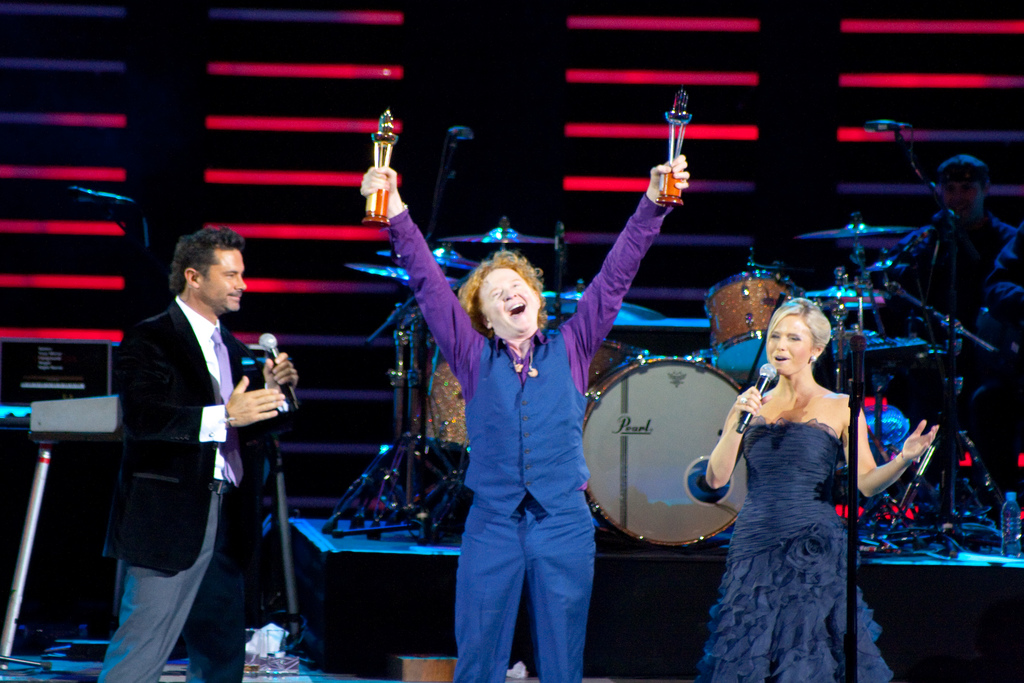
Camiroaga (left) and Soledad Onetto (right) with Simply Red's Mick Hucknall at the 2009 Viña del Mar International Song Festival.

Camiroaga also hosted prime time programmes during the 2000s such as Con Mucho Cariño and Ciudad Gótica, both of which did not complete a full season for their "controversial contents", and the first two seasons of the reality show Pelotón. In 2004 he co-hosted Pasiones with Bárbara Rebolledo, but he left the programme later that year and was replaced by Martín Cárcamo. He returned to Buenos Días a Todos in 2005, sharing duties with Tonka Tomicic, then with Katherine Salosny, and finally Carolina de Moras. The replacement of Salosny by de Moras was not well received and the local entertainment media blamed Camiroaga for it, which later resulted in a mass booing while Camiroaga was being awarded a Premio Copihue de Oro for "Best TV presenter" at the Teatro Caupolicán in Santiago, in 2010. In 2006, he began hosting his own talk show, Animal Nocturno. In February 2009 he co-presented the Viña del Mar International Song Festival with Soledad Onetto, and also co-presented the 2010 edition.

In 2010, Camiroaga co-hosted Halcón y Camaleón with comedian Stefan Kramer. That same year, he received an offer from US television network Univisión to present a breakfast programme. Camiroaga rejected this offer and renewed his contract with TVN for three years.

=== Characters ===
Camiroaga proved to be versatile in his TV programmes, where he created characters such as El Washington, a poor man who lives on the street and survives on leftover food, distinguished by his humble origin. El Washington was created in Buenos Días a Todos, and subsequently developed in Pase lo que Pase, where it became popular in sketch comedies with Karen Doggenweiler, the Señorita Andrea. Camiroaga hosted a radio programme called El Almacén del Washington in Corazón FM, dedicated to the trading of articles.

One of Camiroaga's most recognized characters is Luciano Bello, a TV presenter native to Maracaibo, Venezuela. He is characterized by his large teeth and is coquettish with women. His typical phrase was: "You're hot and intelligent." ("Eres rica e inteligente.") His name parodies Chilean-Venezuelan humanist Andrés Bello, and some of his moves parody those of the singer of same nationality José Luis Rodríguez. Luciano Bello appeared for the first time in La Noche del Mundial in 1998. The character was strongly criticized by deputy Enrique Krauss, who called him vulgar. ("chabacano.")

== Other projects ==
As well as acting in TV series, Camiroaga was active in theatre and cinema. In 2000, he participated in the theatrical work Venecia, directed by Boris Quercia, starring Gabriela Medina, Carmen Barros, Tichi Lobos and Javiera Contador; Camiroaga was the only male actor. In 2006 he had a secondary role in the film Pretendiendo, directed by Claudio Dabed and starred by Uruguayan-Mexican actress Bárbara Mori. The night before his death, on 1 September 2011, Camiroaga participated in the recording of the comedy film Stefan vs. Kramer with comedian Stefan Kramer and TV presenter Martín Cárcamo. At first it was not known whether Camiroaga's scenes would appear in the film, whose release was scheduled for 2012. In late October 2011, Kramer said he would include the scenes in the film, as Camiroaga "wanted to be in it."

In 2001, the programme Pase lo que Pase released the album La Banda del Pase lo que Pase, in which Camiroaga debuted as a singer. The album was produced by Warner Music, and reached gold album status in Chile.

Camiroaga also worked in advertising for Falabella and Ripley. At the time of his death, he still had an active contract with Ripley, who decided to remove all advertising in which Camiroaga appeared.

== Death ==
Camiroaga was travelling with a team from Buenos Días a Todos, personnel from Desafío Levantemos Chile and the National Council of Culture and the Arts to Robinson Crusoe Island in the Juan Fernández Archipelago, when the Chilean Air Force (FACh) CASA C-212 Aviocar plane which was carrying them crashed into the sea and disintegrated while it was trying to land at the Robinson Crusoe Aerodrome, on 2 September 2011. The aircraft tried to touch down twice unsuccessfully before it disappeared. It was piloted by Lieutenant Carolina Fernández, one of the first female pilots in FACh's history, and Lieutenant Juan Pablo Mallea. Journalist Roberto Bruce —also part of Buenos Días a Todos— and businessman Felipe Cubillos, were also aboard the plane.

On 3 September 2011, Defense Minister Andrés Allamand said it was unlikely anyone survived the accident; they may have died instantly on impact. President Sebastián Piñera decreed national mourning for the days of 5 and 6 September 2011. Seven days after the crash, Secretary General of Government Andrés Chadwick announced that body remains rescued from the sea were identified by DNA tests as Camiroaga, Felipe Cubillos and three other passengers.

Camiroaga's remains were cremated in a private ceremony on 12 September 2011, and the next day a funeral oration was conducted at the Televisión Nacional de Chile's headquarters, which was broadcast live by the station. It was attended by five hundred people invited by his family and the TV channel. After the service, the amphora containing the presenter's ashes was moved in a hearse under a police escort, which was followed by his relatives. A crowd of around five thousand people accompanied the hearse from Barrio Bellavista to the Pérgola de las Flores, in Recoleta. After this, his remains were taken to the Parque del Recuerdo cemetery, where a private ceremony was conducted, attended by relatives and Camiroaga's closest friends. On 16 November 2011, Camiroaga's ashes were taken to the Lugar de Los Hombres Ilustres of Villa Alegre's churchyard.

== Posthumous homages and reactions ==
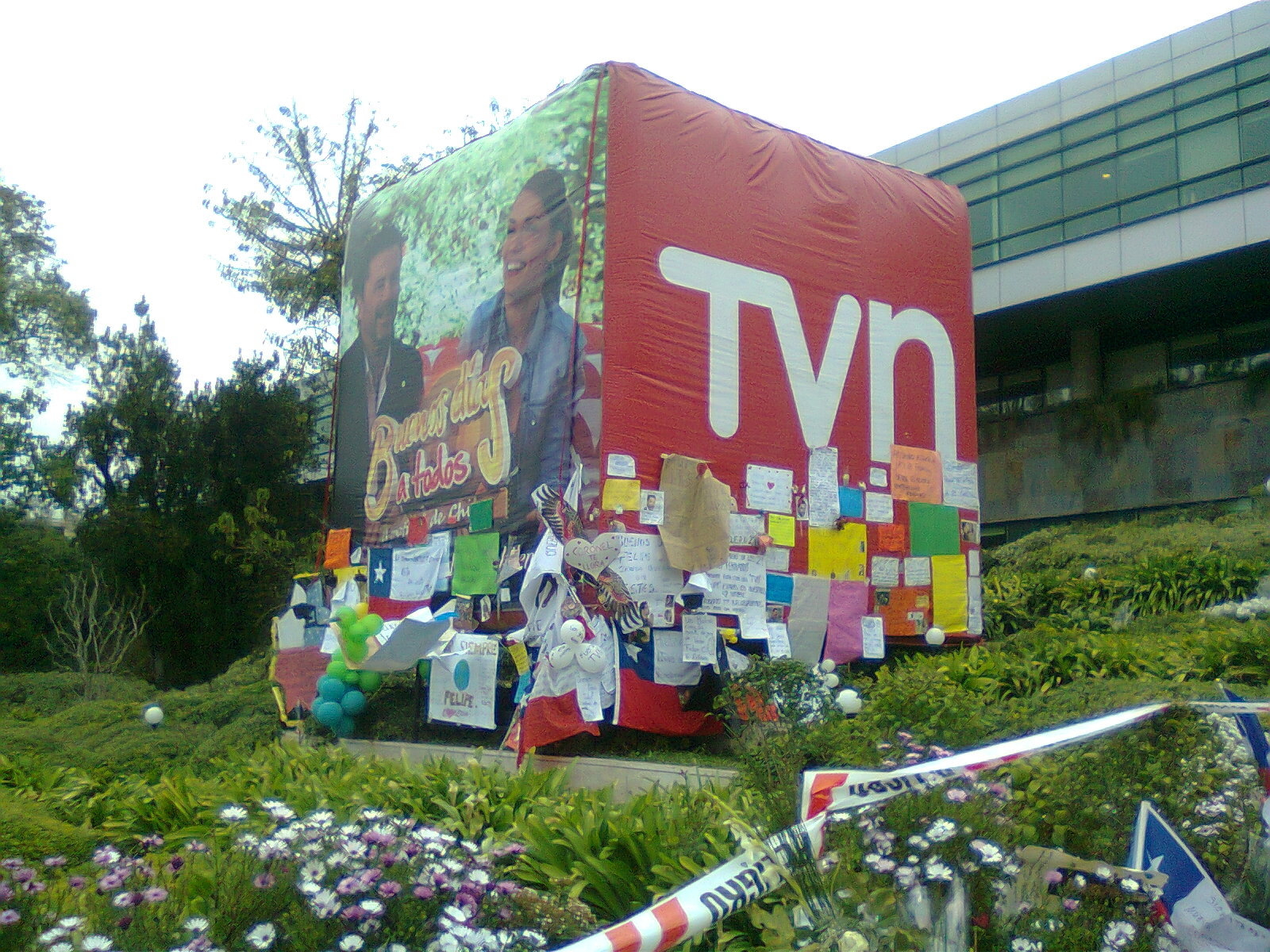
An advertising balloon in the garden of TVN was decorated by the public with signs, flags and balloons after the plane crash.

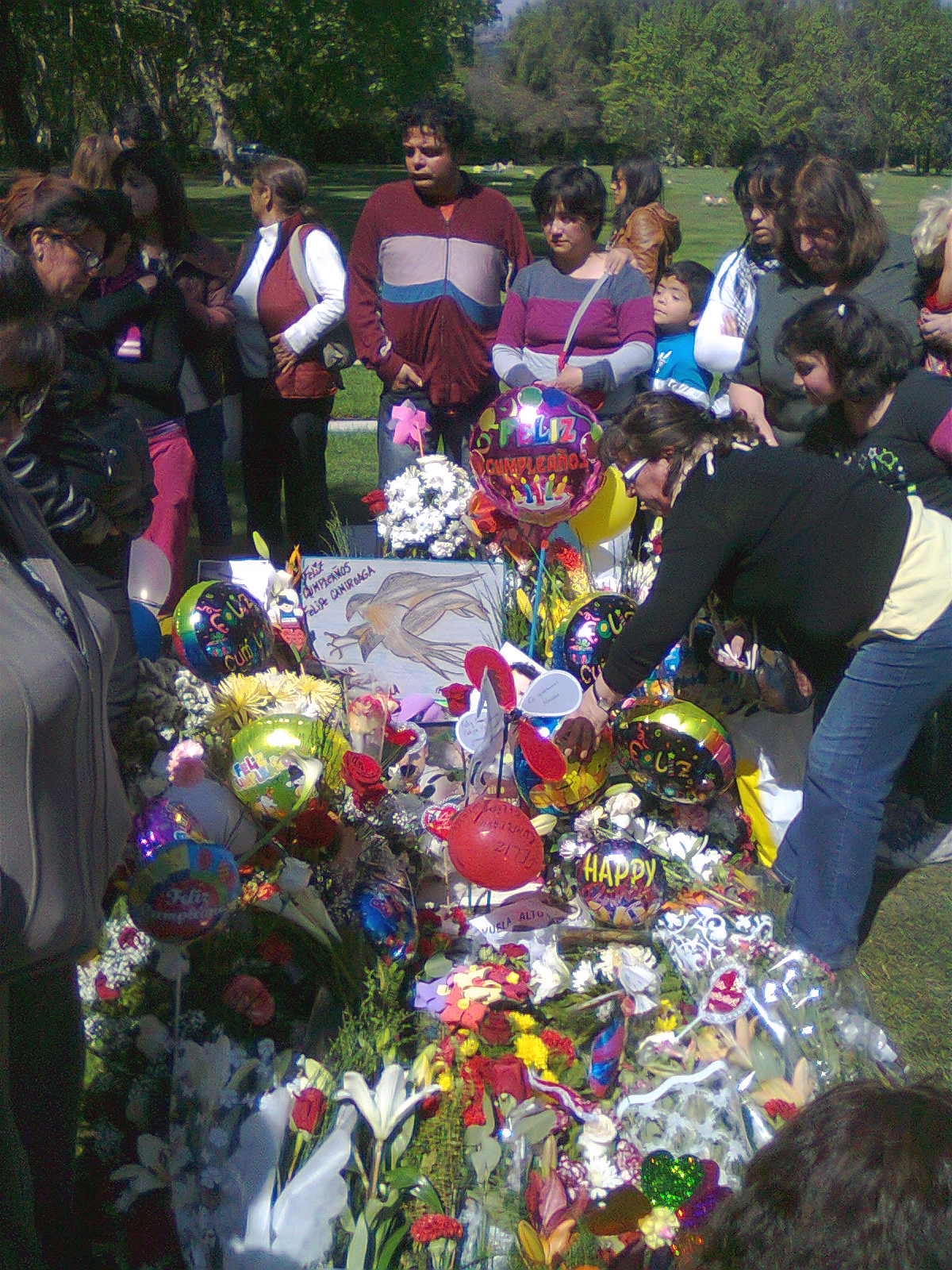
On 8 October 2011, fans of Camiroaga visited his sepulture at Parque del Recuerdo cemetery in Recoleta, to commemorate what would have been his forty-fifth birthday.

After the announcement of Camiroaga's death in the crash, thousands of people went to the façade of the Televisión Nacional de Chile (TVN) headquarters, in the commune of Providencia, to express their love and affection for Camiroaga, the rest of the team from Buenos Días a Todos and the other plane passengers. Such expressions of support were repeated in regional headquarters of the TV channel, where they placed some condolence books for the public.

On 5 September 2011, Julián Elfenbein, Carolina de Moras, Jorge Hevia, Karen Doggenweiler and emblematic staff of Buenos Días a Todos, friends, TVN personalities and from other channels – including competitors of the programme – joined to pay tribute to Camiroaga in his program. In that episode of Buenos Días a Todos, the first since Camiroaga's death, his friend and TV director Daniel Sagüés commented that Felipe once told him that he wanted Silvio Rodríguez's song "Ángel para un Final" to be played in his funeral. As soon as Rodríguez was informed of this, he commented on his blog it would be a "high honour" for him that his song was played at Camiroaga's funeral. Other international personalities, such as Lucero, Yuri, Ricardo Montaner, Alejandro Sanz, Ricky Martin, Luis Fonsi, amid others, expressed their sadness and consternation at Camiroaga's death, through the social networks Facebook, Twitter and YouTube.

The plane crash was extensively covered by the press, nationally and internationally, emphasizing the figure of the TV presenter, including BBC News from the United Kingdom. Qatari news channel Al Jazeera covered the news on the plane crash immediately after it occurred and also emphasized the deaths of Camiroaga and Felipe Cubillos. In Argentina, various media outlets referred to Camiroaga as "the Chilean Tinelli", in reference to Argentinean presenter Marcelo Tinelli. An Argentinean TV programme called Duro de Domar mocked the Juan Fernández tragedy, focusing on Camiroaga and his relationships with Rocío Marengo and Cecilia Bolocco, provoking harsh attacks from Chileans in social networks.

Chilean newspaper Las Últimas Noticias caused controversy on 2 September 2011; its digital edition cover was headlined "The last flight of the Falcon" ("El último vuelo del halcón"), which generated outrage from Internet users, as Camiroaga's whereabouts were unknown at the time. The cover was replaced and the next day the newspaper said the public had misinterpreted the intention of the headline.

Televisión Nacional de Chile decided to name the studio from which Buenos Días a Todos is transmitted "Felipe Camiroaga Fernández", and kept free the TV presenter's parking space to remember him. The municipality of Colina, where Camiroaga lived in Chicureo, announced they would name him posthumously "Illustrious Son" of the community. and the Lo Arcaya Avenue would be renamed after him. Additionally, the Chilean Telethon (Teletón) paid homage to Camiroaga and the twenty other passengers of the aircraft in its opening and at the Julio Martínez National Stadium in the fundraising's 2011 edition.

On 26 September 2011, the National Council of Television (Consejo Nacional de Televisión; CNTV) awarded posthumously Camiroaga with the "Special Award in Communications." The Sala Felipe Camiroaga (Felipe Camiroaga Room) in the Museum of Villa Alegre was inaugurated on 3 May 2012; personal belongings, public and private photographs and a bust of Camiroaga made by Galavarino Ponce are exhibited. His father, siblings, his partner Fernanda Hansen, close friends and followers were present at the ceremony.

In 2013, and as part of the student movement which started in 2011 demanding higher quality and free education in Chile – a movement which Camiroaga supported – students of the Law School of the University of Valparaíso created the Juventud Rebelde Felipe Camiroaga (Felipe Camiroaga Rebel Youth) political group, which describes itself as "[a group of] left-wing students with no defined party, who believe that organization and participation are the necessary tools to make the changes we want," specifying also that "revolution is made by parts", satirizing Camiroaga's death. The group, according to Publimetro Chile, is "partly satire, partly real facts", and is not supposed to use Camiroaga's image as a "martyr", but as "a person who puts them into a crucial movilization frame." The Juventud Rebelde Felipe Camiroaga group has been replicated in other universities, including the University of Chile and the Metropolitan University of Educational Sciences.

== Personal life ==
Although Camiroaga had several romantic relationships within the media industry, Camiroaga never married, and was considered "one of the most coveted bachelors" by the Chilean tabloid press.

Camiroaga was linked romantically with several Chilean TV personalities, such as Katherine Salosny, Angélica Castro, Karen Doggenweiler, Bárbara Rebolledo, Paz Bascuñán and Fernanda Hansen, with whom he was in a relationship at the time of his death. He was also linked to Rocío Marengo, Francini Amaral, Krishna Navas, amid others. In 1992, he had a short-lived relationship with Mexican singer and actress Lucero while they were jurors at the 1992 edition of the Viña del Mar International Song Festival; the relationship later developed into friendship.

Camiroaga lived in a land lot near Chicureo. He lives as a huaso-style farm owner dedicated to the breeding of horses, dogs and birds. In February 2011, his house was totally destroyed by a fire. Although it was first reported the fire was caused by an electrical failure, the possibility that it was arson was later considered. Felipe Camiroaga practiced polo; he also was an aviation enthusiast and completed his pilot training in 1996.

== Political views ==
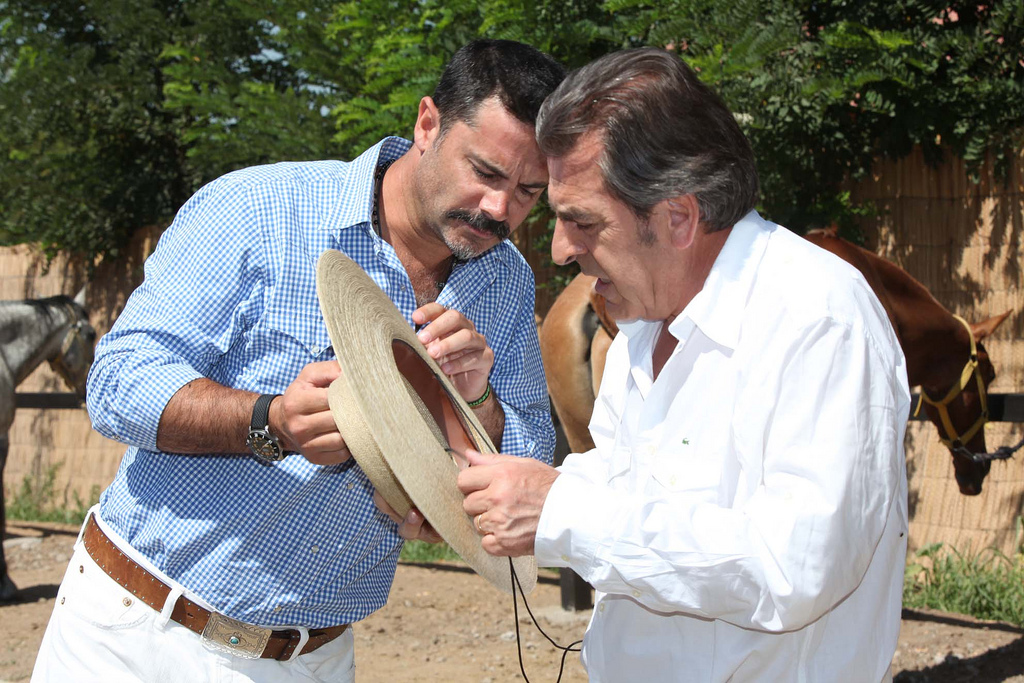
Camiroaga (left) with former President of Chile Eduardo Frei Ruiz-Tagle, which he supported in the 2009–2010 elections, during an interview for his talk show Animal Nocturno.

In his later years, Camiroaga openly demonstrated his political preferences, something uncommon in Chilean television presenters.

It's hard to break the patterns in my workspace, where the TV presenters need to be direct, and neutral in some topics. It surprises me when [people] say we are opinion leaders, but actually [we] the opinion leaders can't say anything but sillinesses, unrelated to deeper issues which interest the country. I have not rebelled, I just think that [as a presenter] I have to change my mind.

— Felipe Camiroaga, Qué Pasa, November 2009

Although he grew up in a right-wing family, supportive of the Pinochet military regime, Camiroaga supported the Concertación coalition of left-wing parties since Chile became a democracy; in 2008 he said he was a "Bacheletist" ("bacheletista") —supporter of President of Chile Michelle Bachelet— in the Caras magazine, and in 2009 he said Chile was admired for the governments of such a coalition. In 2010 he joined the runoff campaign of Eduardo Frei Ruiz-Tagle, the Concertación candidate for the Chilean presidential election. Frei said Camiroaga was a "very brave man" for publicly expressing his political views.

Camiroaga also participated in campaigns by Greenpeace; he openly asked Chile's Interior Minister Rodrigo Hinzpeter on Buenos Días a Todos for the government, led by Sebastián Piñera, to halt the installation of a thermoelectric plant in Caleta Punta Choros—which was later reversed— and supported the 2011 student movement in Chile.

Due to his frequent social and political activism, his death has often been the subject of numerous conspiracy theories concerning the Chilean government's alleged involvement in his death. Just a couple of days before the accident which led to his death, Camiroaga's home in Chicureo had caught fire, which the Brigade of Special Investigations assured was "intentional", which has often been cited as "proof" for the supposed killing.

== Filmography ==
As a television presenter

Year	Programme	Channel(s)
1988–1989	Video Top	RTU
1990–1991	Extra Jóvenes	RTU
1992, 2005–2011	Buenos Días a Todos	TVN
1992	La Gran Apuesta	TVN
1995	El Chapuzón	TVN
1996–1997	Motín a Bordo	TVN
1997	Contigo en Verano	TVN
1998, 2006	La Noche del Mundial	TVN
1998–2002	Pase lo que Pase	TVN
1998–1999	Súper Salvaje	TVN
2002–2003	Con Mucho Cariño	TVN
2002–2003	La Gran Sorpresa	TVN
2003–2004	Ciudad Gótica	TVN
2004	Pasiones	TVN
2004	Novios, Dulce Condena	TVN
2006–2011	Animal Nocturno	TVN
2007	Pelotón	TVN
2007–2008	Pelotón II	TVN
2009–2010	Viña del Mar International Song Festival	TVN/C13
2010	Halcón y Camaleón	TVN

As an actor in movies

Year	Title	Role	Director
2006	Pretendiendo	Pepe	Claudio Dabed
2012	Stefan v/s Kramer	Himself	Stefan Kramer

As an actor in TV series

Year	Title	Role	Channel
1993	Jaque Mate	Aldo Tapia	TVN
1994	Rojo y Miel	Javier Escudero	TVN

As an actor (other appearances)

Year	Program	Role	Channel
2005	El Cuento del Tío ("El Infarto" episode)	Eduardo	TVN
2008	Hijos del Monte	Cameo	TVN
2009	Los Ángeles de Estela	Cameo	TVN
2011	Un Minuto Para Ganar	Contestant	TVN
2011	Frontera Azul	Guest presenter	TVN

== Discography ==
- 2003: La Banda del Pase lo que Pase (with Karen Doggenweiler; gold in Chile)

== Awards and recognitions ==
- 2006: Great Compipa of the Guachacas; Guachaca King.
- 2006–2011 (posthumously): Copihue de Oro Award to "Best TV Presenter".
- 2009:
  - APES Award to "Best TV presenter".
  - (and 2011, posthumously) TV Grama Award to "Best TV Presenter".
- 2011: Social Communicator Special Award, given by the National Council of Television.
