= ¿Quién quiere ser millonario? (Peruvian game show) =

Peruvian game show

- Created by: Peruviana Media
- Presented by: Guido Lombardi
- Country of origin: Peru

Original release
- Network: Canal 13
- Release: July 1, 2001 – March 1, 2002

¿Quién quiere ser millonario? (English translation: Who wants to be a millionaire?) is a Peruvian quiz show based on the original British format of Who Wants to Be a Millionaire? The show was hosted by Guido Lombardi. The main goal of the game was to win one million Peruvian nuevo sol (US$295,000) by answering fifteen multiple-choice questions correctly. There were three lifelines - fifty fifty, phone a friend and ask the audience. ¿Quién quiere ser millonario? was broadcast from 2001 to 2002. It was shown on the Peruvian TV station Canal 13. When a contestant got the fifth question correct, he left with at least S/. 1,000. When a contestant got the tenth question correct, he left with at least S/. 32,000. The biggest prize won on the show was S/. 32,000. Second season of the show was announced but due to internal problems at the network this never happened.

== Money tree ==
Payout structure
| Question number | Question value |
|---|---|
| 15 | S/. 1,000,000 |
| 14 | S/. 500,000 |
| 13 | S/. 250,000 |
| 12 | S/. 125,000 |
| 11 | S/. 64,000 |
| 10 | S/. 32,000 |
| 9 | S/. 16,000 |
| 8 | S/. 8,000 |
| 7 | S/. 4,000 |
| 6 | S/. 2,000 |
| 5 | S/. 1,000 |
| 4 | S/. 500 |
| 3 | S/. 300 |
| 2 | S/. 200 |
| 1 | S/. 100 |
Milestone Top prize
