= ¿Quién quiere ser millonario? (Panamanian game show) =

- Presented by: Atenógenes Rodríguez
- Country of origin: Panama

Original release
- Network: Telemetro
- Release: 9 July 2009 – 29 December 2011

¿Quién quiere ser millonario? (English translation: Who wants to be a millionaire?) is a Panamanian game show based on the original British format of Who Wants to Be a Millionaire?. The show is hosted by Atenógenes Rodríguez. The main goal of the game is to win US$100,000 by answering 15 multiple-choice questions correctly. There are three lifelines – 50:50, phone a friend and ask the audience . ¿Quién quiere ser millonario? is broadcast from 2009 to 2011. It is shown on the Telemetro. When a contestant gets the fifth question correct, he leaves with at least $1,000 When a contestant gets the tenth question correct, he leaves with at least $8,000

== The game's prizes ==
Payout structure
Question number	Question value (in USD)
15	$100,000
14	$50,000
13	$25,000
12	$17,500
11	$12,000
10	$8,000
9	$5,000
8	$3,250
7	$2,000
6	$1,500
5	$1,000
4	$650
3	$400
2	$200
1	$100
Milestone Top prize
