= Carlos Cámara Jr. =

Venezuelan actor

- Born: 1 December 1956 (age 69); Mérida, Venezuela
- Occupation: Actor
- Years active: 1981–present

Carlos Cámara Jr. (born 1 December 1956) is a Venezuelan actor. He appeared in more than twenty telenovelas since 1981. Cámara was born into a family of actors. His parents Carlos Cámara and Elisa Parejo and his brother Víctor Cámara are also actors.

== Selected filmography ==
TV
| Year | Title | Role | Notes |
|---|---|---|---|
| 1984 | Topacio | Cirilo | |
| 1987 | Mi amada Beatriz | El Griego | |
| 1988 | Señora | Kennedy | |
| 1990 | Caribe | Roberto Castell | |
| 1998 | Niña mimada | Joaquin Iriarte | |
