= Paola Bontempi =

Spanish actress

- Born: Paola Bontempi Fernández; September 12, 1977 (age 48); Tenerife, Canary Islands, Spain
- Occupations: Television host, actress
- Children: 1
- Relatives: Felipe Camiroaga (half-brother)

Paola Bontempi Fernández (Spanish: [ˈpawla βonˈtempi], Italian: [ˈpaːola bonˈtɛmpi]; born 12 September 1977) a Spanish actress and television host.

Bontempi was born to Chilean parents: María de la Luz Fernández Stemann, mother of the deceased Chilean television presenter Felipe Camiroaga, and Fernando Bontempi. Bontempi's mother has partial German descent, and her father has Italian blood. Bontempi has lived in Spain, the United Kingdom and the United States. She studied theater since she was eleven, and at age 21, she debuted as presenter in the Canarias television, hosting three different programs: Cifras y letras, El Expreso or Mira cómo va and was also seen in Mi Tierra Televisión.

She also appeared in series like La que se avecina (Tele5), Guante blanco (TVE), Maitena: Estados alterados (La Sexta) and Hospital Central (Tele 5). She has also participated in European movies.

In 2016, Bontempi portrayed Catherine of Aragon in the documentary drama series Six Wives with Lucy Worsley on BBC 1.
