= ¿Quién quiere ser millonario? (Costa Rican game show) =

Costa Rican game show

- Titlecard since 2021
- Presented by: Ignacio Santos Pasamontes (2009-2025); Gustavo Rojas (2022); Edgar Silva (2026-present)
- Country of origin: Costa Rica

Production
- Producer: Mario Najéra
- Running time: c. 60 minutes

Original release
- Network: Teletica Canal 7
- Release: 3 February 2009 – 3 September 2013
- Release: 27 April 2021 – present

Titlecard from 2009 to 2013.

¿Quién quiere ser millonario? (English translation: Who Wants to Be a Millionaire?) is a Costa Rican game show based on the original British format of Who Wants to Be a Millionaire?. The show is hosted by Edgar Silva, previously by Ignacio Santos Pasamontes and Gustavo Rojas. It is shown on Teletica.

== Money tree ==
Payout structure
Question number	Question value		
Question number	2009–2012	2013 2021–2022	2023–
15	₡25,000,000	₡30,000,000	₡35,000,000
14	₡15,000,000		₡17,000,000
13	₡10,000,000		₡12,000,000
12	₡7,500,000		₡9,000,000
11	₡5,000,000		₡6,000,000
10	₡3,000,000		₡3,500,000
9	₡2,000,000		₡2,500,000
8	₡1,500,000		₡1,700,000
7	₡1,000,000		₡1,200,000
6	₡750,000		₡800,000
5	₡500,000		₡600,000
4	₡400,000		
3	₡300,000		
2	₡200,000		
1	₡100,000		
Milestone Top prize

== Broadcast history ==
¿Quién quiere ser millonario? was originally broadcast from February 3, 2009 to September 3, 2013. A revival premiered on April 27, 2021. It is a pre-recorded show that is currently shot at Roque Cozza Studio, at Teletica's studios.

== Rules ==
The main goal of the game is to win ₡35,000,000 by answering 15 multiple-choice questions correctly. There are three lifelines - 50:50, Ask One of the Audience and Switch the Question. When a contestant gets the fifth question correct, they leave with at least ₡600,000. When a contestant gets the tenth question correct, they leave with at least ₡3,500,000.

== Winners ==
Three contestants have won the top prize so far.

- Willy Pérez - June 29, 2010

₡25,000,000 - no time limit

During the 1962 World Cup in Chile, the following national football team had players from 5 different nationalities:

1. Portugal
2. Spain(correct answer)
3. Hungary
4. Switzerland
- Inés Trejos - September 28, 2021

₡30,000,000 - no time limit

"Gave his life for the freedoms of Costa Rica" says the epitaph on the grave of:

1. Pancha Carrazco Jiménez
2. José María Cañas Escamilla
3. Juan Rafael Mora Porras
4. Marcelino García Flamenco(correct answer)
- Sebastián Marín - June 9, 2026

₡35,000,000 - no time limit

According to FIFA, which team has the best average of goals per game in World Cup history?

1. Brazil
2. Germany
3. Hungary(correct answer)
4. France
