= Mundo de fieras (Venezuelan TV series) =

- Genre: Telenovela; Romance; Drama
- Created by: Ligia Lezama
- Written by: Valentina Parraga; Abigail Truchess; Francisco Martinez; Juan Clemente; Maria Antonella Gomez
- Directed by: Gabriel Walfenzao
- Creative director: Arquímedes Rivero
- Starring: Catherine Fulop; Jean Carlo Simancas; Rosalinda Serfaty; Chelo Rodriguez
- Opening theme: "Dejame llorar" by Ricardo Montaner
- Country of origin: Venezuela
- Original language: Spanish
- No. of episodes: 239

Production
- Executive producer: Marisol Campos
- Production location: Caracas
- Running time: 41–44 minutes
- Production company: Venevisión

Original release
- Network: Venevisión
- Release: March 6, 1991 – March 4, 1992

Related
- Pasionaria; Cara sucia

Mundo de fieras (English title: World of Beasts) is a Venezuelan telenovela written by Ligia Lezama for Venevisión. The telenovela premiered on Venevisión on March 6, 1991, and ran for 239 episodes until March 4, 1992, where it achieved a significant amount of success in Venezuela. The telenovela was distributed internationally by Venevisión International.

Catherine Fulop and Jean Carlo Simancas starred as the main protagonists with Rosalinda Serfaty and Chelo Rodriguez as the main antagonists.

== Synopsis ==
Mundo de Fieras tells the story of the consequences of the irresponsible parenthood of Leoncio Palacios who abandoned his wife and young daughter in the countryside to run off with another woman, Miriam Palacios. Charito Flores, his daughter, develops into a young beautiful woman forced to live in an inhospitable world which molds her into a charming and aggressive survivor. Once her mother dies, Charito gets a job at Leoncio's house where he is gravely ill. Before dying, he asks Charito to forgive him for abandoning them many years ago. During this time, Charito falls in live with Jose Manuel Bustamante who awakens in her the deepest feelings. But he is married to Joselyn Bustamante, a hysterical woman suffering from a mental illness, who will strike violently when she discovers her husband's love for Charito.

== Cast ==
=== Main ===
- Catherine Fulop as Charito Flores / Viviana
- Jean Carlo Simancas as Jose Manuel Bustamante
- Rosalinda Serfaty as Jocelyn Palacios Ansola de Sartori Bustamante
- Luis José Santander as Ivan Soriano
- Elluz Peraza as Indiana Castro / Sor Piedad
- Miguel Alcantara as Silvio Ascanio
- Chelo Rodriguez as Miriam de Palacios Ansola

=== Recurring ===
- Mirtha Borges as Chabela Soriano
- Maria Elena Dominguez as Charo
- Marisela Buitriago as Leonicia
- Orangel Delfin as Leoncio
- Diego Balaguer as Emilio / Clemente Sartori
- Simón Pestana as Amadeo Bustamante
- Ernesto Balzi as Federico
- Carolina Lopez as Brigitte Perdigon
- Lilibeth Morillo as Tamara "Tammi" Soriano
- Marcelo Romo as Raymundo Camaro
- Liliana Rodriguez as Chinca
- Luis Gerardo Núñez as Valentín Velasco
- Dulce María Pilonieta as Manuela "Chelita" Bustamante Perdigón
- Gabriela Spanic

== Remake ==
Mundo de Fieras was remade in Mexico by producer Salvador Mejia and starred Edith González, César Évora, Helena Rojo, Gaby Espino.
