= Rosalinda (Mexican TV series) =

1999 Mexican television serial drama

- Genre: Telenovela
- Created by: Delia Fiallo
- Based on: María Teresa by Grazio D' Angelo
- Written by: Liliana Abud; Kari Fajer; Carlos Romero
- Story by: Delia Fiallo
- Directed by: Beatriz Sheridan
- Starring: Thalía; Fernando Carrillo; Angélica María; Lupita Ferrer
- Theme music composer: José Antonio "Potro" Farías
- Opening theme: "Rosalinda" by Thalía
- Composer: Kike Santander
- Country of origin: Mexico
- Original language: Spanish
- No. of episodes: 80

Production
- Executive producer: Salvador Mejía Alejandre
- Producer: Nathalie Lartilleux
- Production locations: Mexico City, Mexico
- Cinematography: Lino Gama; Manuel Barajas; Karlos Velázquez
- Editor: Marco Antonio Rocha

Original release
- Network: Canal de las Estrellas
- Release: March 1 – June 18, 1999

Related
- Primavera (1987); Rosalinda (2009)

Rosalinda is a Mexican telenovela produced by Salvador Mejía Alejandre for Televisa in 1999. It is a remake of the 1972 telenovela María Teresa. It stars Thalía, Fernando Carrillo and Angélica María and Lupita Ferrer.

This was the last telenovela wherein Thalía starred in (to focus on her rising music career at that time). Rosalinda remains as the most expensive television production in Mexico. It is also the most watched foreign program in the Philippines and still remains the second most watched program in the Philippines overall.

== Related ==
Actors Lupita Ferrer and Fernando Carrillo are among the actors that have appeared in related Venezuelan productions.

== Plot ==
Rosalinda, a beautiful flower seller and decorator at a fancy restaurant, meets Fernando José, a high-society pianist. They fall in love, get married, and have a daughter named Erika. However, Fernando José's stepmother, Valeria, schemes to break them up and has a perfect plan to do so.

Rosalinda's real mother, Soledad, served 20 years in prison for a murder she didn't commit. Upon learning this, Fernando José abandons Rosalinda and their daughter. Valeria kidnaps their daughter, Erika, causing Rosalinda to lose her mind and be confined to a mental hospital.

One night, the mental hospital catches fire and burns down. Rosalinda escapes but is believed dead by her loved ones. Suffering from amnesia, she is forced into thievery by an old man, known as El Miserias, who takes her in. She meets Alejandro "Alex" Dorantes while attempting to steal from his house. Alex helps her, and she assumes the identity of Paloma Dorantes, becoming a singer and falling in love with Alex, who is a talent agent. Meanwhile, Fernando José marries Rosalinda's cousin, Fedra. Beto, Fedra's brother, begins an abusive relationship with Abril, one of the maids at Valeria's house.

Rosalinda's life with Alex seems good, but something feels off. Attending one of Fernando José's concerts, she hears a song that triggers her memories. Overwhelmed, she leaves the concert hall and is hit by a car. Alex rushes her to the hospital, where she realizes she is Rosalinda, not Paloma. With her memory restored, Rosalinda sets out to reclaim her child, family, and Fernando José. Valeria ends up killing El Miserias after threatening to blackmail her, Beto witnesses the crime, and ends up becoming Valeria's accomplice after he seduces her.

As Rosalinda's real father, Alfredo, dies, he reveals to Valeria, that he was one to commit the murder 20 years ago, and that Soledad is innocent. Valeria thinks that he is lying, and as a result, makes sure that none of Alfredo's wealth manages to get to Rosalinda. Don Florentino, the owner of the flower shop where Rosalinda works, is mad at this revelation, and decides to collaborate with Bertha, the housekeeper of Valeria, who secretly had a crush on Alfredo through all the years, to bring Valeria down. As a result, Bertha's note containing all the crimes committed by Valeria, is discovered by Valeria and Beto, who decide to silence her by running her over with a car, however, after Bertha is revealed to be still alive, Beto suffocates her in the hospital room. Florentino, decides to try a different tactic with Valeria, by planting doubts in her head, that Beto might one day betray her. Florentino is poisoned to death by Valeria. Rosalinda is given information by Florentino before he dies, about where to find a poor woman, by the name of Verónica, who is actually the real mother of Fernando José, in which Rosalinda eventually helps reconnect her with her son.

Fedra tries making Fernando José stay with her, and to prevent a divorce, announces that she is pregnant with his child. Fedra then seduces Aníbal, her Sister, Lucía's husband, in order to get herself pregnant with his child. Abril leaves Beto after she witnesses him kissing Valeria.

Rosalinda, is saved by Agustín Morales, a fan of her singing, who rescues her from one of Valeria's evil schemes, and decides to start a romance with her, Agustín eventually takes legal action on Fernando José and Fedra, to win back Erika, which eventually succeeds. Rosalinda tries rekindling her romance with Fernando José, which at first, goes smoothly, but Fernando José, eventually decides to stay by Fedra's side, after learning that she has a disease that has no cure, and that she will eventually die. After the death of Fedra, Lucía decides to raise the child of Aníbal and Fedra, forgiving Aníbal in the process.

Rosalinda, thinking that Fernando José started loving her again just to spite her, decides to attend a charity event in which Valeria is present. Rosalinda donates all of her wedding jewelry gifted to her by Fernando José, and shames Valeria, after revealing to all of Valeria's friends, that Abril Quiñones, whom everyone thought was just a maid, is actually the abused daughter of Valeria and El Miserias. As Fernando José finally accepts who his real mother is, Verónica explains that Valeria was her Cousin and husband's secret lover, and the two conspired against her to steal all of her wealth, framing Verónica for a thievery she never committed, leading to how she ended up poor. As Fernando José abandons Valeria after all she has done, Valeria and Beto are both arrested by the police, after Cosme, Valeria’s Bodyguard is revealed to be part of the police, who finds evidence of Valeria’s crimes, in the note that Bertha wrote, which was never burned because Beto wanted to use it to possibly blackmail Valeria in the future.

Rosalinda is preparing to marry Agustín, but during the wedding ceremony, Agustín rejects Rosalinda, saying that her heart belongs to Fernando José, Rosalinda decides to remarry Fernando José.

== Cast ==
=== Main cast ===
- Thalía as Rosalinda Pérez Romero / Rosalinda del Castillo - Altamirano / Paloma Dοrantes
- Fernando Carrillo as Fernando Jose del Castillo Altamirano
- Angélica María as Soledad Martha Romero
- Lupita Ferrer as Doña Valeria Del Castillo Altamirano

=== Supporting cast ===
- Nora Salinas as Fedra Pérez Romero
- Adriana Fonseca as Lucía "Lucy" Pérez Romero Pacheco
- Elvira Monsell as Bertha Álvarez
- Jorge De Silva as Roberto "Beto" Pérez Romero
- René Muñoz as Don Florentino Rosas
- Eduardo Luna as Aníbal Eduardo Rivera Pacheco
- Víctor Noriega as Alejandro "Alex" Dorantes
- Miguel Ángel Rodríguez as Javier Pérez
- Anastasia as Alcira Ordóñez
- Ninón Sevilla as Asunción
- Renata Flores as Zoila Barriga
- Alejandro Ávila as Gerardo Navarette
- Laura Zapata as Verónica Del Castillo de Altamirano
- Ivonne Montero as Celina Barriga
- Roberto “Flaco” Guzmán as Francisco Quiñones “El Miserias”
- Manuel Saval as Alfredo Del Castillo
- Guillermo García Cantú as José Fernando Altamirano
- Sabine Moussier as Cristina
- Esther Rinaldi as Abril Quiñones Del Castillo
- Sergio Reynoso as Agustín Morales
- Tere Tarin as Natalia
- Tina Romero as Dolores Romero
- Meche Barba as Angustias
- Paty Diaz as Clarita
- Raúl Padilla "Chóforo" as Bonifacio
- Mariana Ávila as Carolina Pérez Romero

=== Special Performance ===
- Queta Lavat as the prison director

== International airing ==
- Philippines: Rosalinda aired on ABS-CBN from January 10 to September 1, 2000, replacing Chabelita and was replaced by Daniela's Dairy. The series moved to GMA Network from June 16 to November 14, 2003, replacing María la del Barrio and was replaced by Funny Wild Girl. It reran on GMA Network from November 3, 2008, to June 26, 2009, replacing the rerun of Marimar as well, and was replaced by Lalola. It was moved to TV5 on May 5, 2025, replacing the rerun of Marimar, and was extended until Saturday.
- Indonesia : Rosalinda first aired in Indonesia in SCTV in 1999, and rerun in 2005. The first aired of the telenovela became the most watched telenovela ever since in Indonesia. It was also broadcast on other television networks, which are in RCTI in 2004 and MDTV in 2025.

== Philippine adaptation ==
In 2009, GMA Network produced a Philippine adaptation of the series starring Carla Abellana as Rosalinda and Geoff Eigenmann as Fernando Jose. Rosalinda premiered on July 6, 2009, on the network's Telebabad primetime block and ended on November 27, 2009, with a total of 105 episodes.
