= Fernando Carrillo =

Venezuelan actor and model (born 1966)

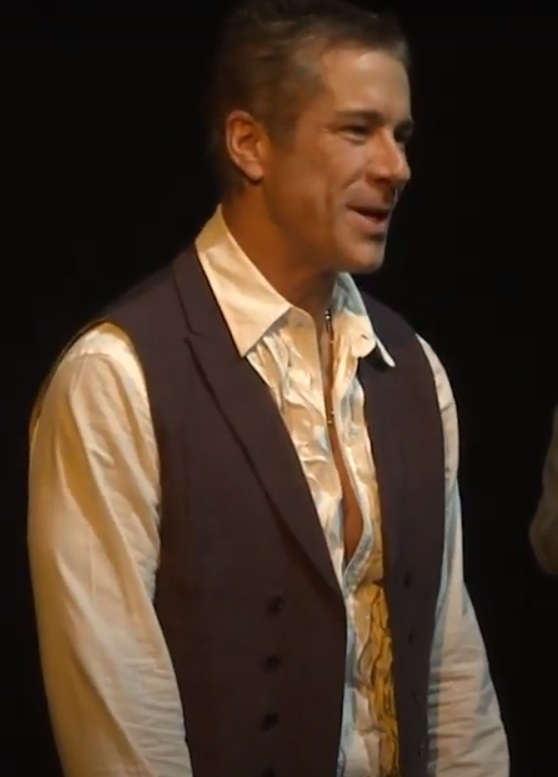
- Carrillo in 2018
- Born: Fernando Enrique Carrillo Roselli; 6 January 1966 (age 60); Caracas, Venezuela
- Occupations: Actor; model; singer
- Years active: 1985–present
- Height: 1.83 m (6 ft 0 in)
- Spouses: Catherine Fulop (m. 1990; div. 1994) María Gabriela Rodríguez (m. 2021)
- Partner: Delcy Rodríguez (c. 2004–2007)
- Children: 2

Fernando Enrique Carrillo Roselli (born 6 January 1966) is a Venezuelan actor, model and singer.

== Early life ==
Fernando Enrique Carrillo Roselli was born on 6 January 1966, in Caracas, Venezuela. He received most of his education in London and graduated from the Central University of Venezuela.

== Career ==
Carrillo is most known for his telenovelas, such as María Isabel and Rosalinda. He was part of a music band in Venezuela along with his two siblings.

In December 2012, Carrillo visited the Philippines, where he was interviewed by Korina Sanchez during her radio show on DZMM and Boy Abunda on The Buzz.

== Personal life ==
In 1990, Carrillo married the actress Catherine Fulop. They divorced in 1994. Carrillo has a son named Ángel Gabriel Carrillo, born in November 2008.

In 2020, he married Maria Gabriela Rodriguez. In 2022, the couple had a son named Milo Carillo Rodriguez. Carrillo and his wife reside in Tulum, Quintana Roo, Mexico.

In January 2026, he publicly acknowledged that he was once in a relationship with Delcy Rodríguez, the current acting president of Venezuela. The relationship lasted for three years, and ended in 2007.

== Filmography ==
=== Television ===
Year	Title	Character	Channel
1985	Cantaré para ti		
1986	La dama de rosa	José Luis Ustariz	RCTV
1986	Mansión de Luxe	Álvaro Angudo	RCTV
1987–1988	Primavera	Eduardo Luis de la Plaza	RCTV
1988	La muchacha del circo	Héctor Tamayo/Alejandro Tamayo	RCTV
1988–1989	Abigail	Carlos Alfredo Ruiz Aponte	RCTV
1989–1990	Amor marcado		RCTV
1990–1991	Pasionaria	Jesús Alberto Tovar/Jesús Alberto Urdaneta Tovar	Venevisión
1991–1992	La mujer prohibida	Carlos Luis Gallardo	Venevisión
1993	All in the Game	Jesús Vila	
1994	Habitación 503	Rubén Osvaldo	TVE
1994	Cara bonita	Iván	Telefe
1997–1998	María Isabel	Ricardo Mendiola Zúñiga	Canal de las Estrellas
1999	Rosalinda	Fernando José Altamirano del Castillo	Canal de las Estrellas
2000	Siempre te amaré	Mauricio Castellanos Grajales	Canal de las Estrellas
2001–2002	Ponderosa	Carlos Rivera de Vega	PAX TV
2010	Soy tu fan	Willy	Once TV México
2017	Divina, está en tu corazón	Luis Correa	Canal 13
2018	No Fear of Truth	Miguel	Canal de las Estrellas

=== Theater ===
Year	Title	Character
2003	Latinologues	
2009	Hasta que la boda nos separe	
2010	Cena de matrimonios	

=== Movies ===
Year	Movie	Character	Director
2004	Cero y van 4	José	Carlos Carrera, Antonio Serrano, Alejandro Gamboa and Fernando Sariñana
2004	2+2=5=1	Fernando	Miguel Mas
2004	The Pool	The Chef	Edgar Pablos
2005	Las llaves de la independencia	Lázaro	Carlos Gil
2005	Pit Fighter	Veneno	Jesse V. Johnson
2005	Caracazo	Alejo Sanpredo	Román Chalbaud
2006	Sexo, amor y otras perversiones		
2007	Spin	Theo	Dan Neira
2009	Secretos de familia	René	Paco del Toro
2010	Love Equation	Fernando	Miguel Mas
2010	Boyle Heights	Dr. Carrillo	Francisco Aragon
2011	Gone Hollywood	Al	Demetrius Navarro
2012	Lotoman 2.0	Marcelo	Archie López
2014	Lotoman 003	Marcelo	Archie López
2014	Los Scavengers	Eugenio	Valente Rodriguez
2018	A Dog & Pony Show	Nigel	Demetrius Navarro
2018	Bendecidas	Leo	Daniel Aurelio

=== Television programs ===
Year	Program	Role	Notes
2012	Pareja perfecta	Participant	1st eliminated
2016	Bailando 2016	Participant	6th eliminated
2022	¿Quién es la máscara? (Mexican season 4)	Cáctus	6th eliminated
2023	El hotel de los famosos (season 2)	Participant	5th place / ~~10th eliminated~~

== Discography ==
=== Singles ===
==== As lead artist ====
- 1990 — Desde aquí
- 1998 — Algún día
- 2000 — Fernando in Manila
