= Miguel Mas (actor) =

Argentine actor, writer, and director

- Born: November 3, 1967 (age 58); San Juan, Argentina
- Occupations: Actor, writer, director

Miguel Mas (born November 3, 1967) is an Argentinian actor, writer, and director, known for his roles on television, and as a guest star on the long-running medical drama ER. He has also had roles in Days of Our Lives and General Hospital.

== Biography ==
Mas was born in Argentina and grew up in a big Spanish family. In 1991, he moved to Puerto Rico where he discovered the world of marketing and began to work in television. As an actor, he appeared on numerous television series. Mas also served as a host for a musical television show. In 1993 he started the theatre group, Lunetika along with several other actors. Miguel acted in the theatre troop and helped direct many of their acts.

In 1994, Mas left for Spain, where he was introduced to Stanislavski's 'system' of acting and, later, began to write. In 1998 he arrived in New York City, performing in the Spanish Repertoire Theater. By the end of 1998 he was living in Los Angeles, California, where he enrolled at the Lee Strasberg Theatre Institute to hone his acting skills. Mas continued working as an actor, but never forgot his passion for directing. He has worked as an actor with Steven Spielberg, Takeshi Kitano, Tom Cruise, Alfonso Arau, and Laura Harring, among others.

In 2002 Mas wrote Círculos; a story which he also directed. In 2003 Mas wrote and started production on the film, 2+2=5=1 marking his debut as a feature film director. When 2+2=5=1 was completed in 2004 it debuted at the Festival Iberoamericano in Montreal and Nosotros American Latino Film Festival.

In 2005 the success of 2+2=5=1 persisted. Miguel went to New Mexico to present his film at the Sin Fronteras Film Festival. Recently, Mas wrote the pilot episode of the television series, Hollywood & Highland. At the end of 2005, his business, Mas & More Entertainment co-produced along with The Group at Strasberg and David Lee Strasberg, the play entitled, "The King of the Lighthouse," written and directed by Juan Carlos Malpeli.

In 2006 Mas completed the trailer promo for Hollywood & Highland, and a music video for the song "AMOR, mi luz mi estrella", an original song created for his new short film Absorbido, which was shown in three film festivals. He also represented Jesus in "Jesus Christ: The Musical".

Miguel Mas' main focus now is to finish his project known as Círculos. Mas is currently studying at the Lee Strasberg Theater and Film Institute in Los Angeles.
