= ¿Quién quiere ser millonario? (Venezuelan game show) =

- Created by: David Briggs; Mike Whitehill; Steven Knight
- Presented by: Eladio Lárez
- Composers: Keith Strachan; Matthew Strachan (2000-2017); Ramon Covalo; Nick Magnus (2011-2017)
- Country of origin: Venezuela

Production
- Running time: 60 minutes

Original release
- Network: RCTV/RCTV Internacional (2000-2010); Televen (2011-2017)
- Release: 23 August 2000 – 2 April 2017

¿Quién Quiere ser Millonario? (English translation: Who Wants to be a Millionaire?) is a Venezuelan quiz show based on the original British format of Who Wants to Be a Millionaire?. The show offered large cash prizes for correctly answering a series of randomized multiple-choice questions of varying difficulties. It was hosted by Eladio Lárez, and broadcast from the Teatro La Campina.

It was labeled by the Venezuelan press and critics as the best and most popular game show in the country, though the format is repeated in other Latin American countries.

== Broadcast history ==
The show first aired on Radio Caracas Television (RCTV) from August 23, 2000 to May 23, 2007, four days before the station lost its broadcast license on May 27. The show returned to air on July 18, 2007 when RCTV became a cable television network, and ended production on January 20, 2010; the station was shut down on January 24. On May 8, 2011 it began airing on Televen as an original RCTV production. It was canceled in 2017, last broadcasting on April 2, 2017.

In 2003, a special called Jugamos Millonario was broadcast.

By 2016, the Bs.F 2 million prize equated in black market exchange to US$2,000, with competitors also borrowing clothes from Televen's studio wardrobe to appear presentable on-screen, and realistic prizes amounting to only a few dollars. Lárez's pay was also cut, and he said that the TV station was crippled by the country's crisis, but the show's producer said that for simple Venezuelans just appearing on the show was a big prize. The show was cancelled on 2017, last episode broadcast in 2nd April 2017.

== Format ==
Any legal resident of Venezuela who is over 18 and not employed by RCTV could take part, entering via phone or text-to-enter quiz called "Let's play Millionaire!". People who answered correctly would be put into a random draw to compete on the show.

=== "The Fastest Mind" ===
The first round has the competitors all answer one question, with whoever answered correctly the fastest going on to play for money. Competitors who do not make it past this round can re-enter the show after six months, while those who do proceed must wait a year. For a time, the winners of "The Fastest Mind" won a physical prize.

=== "Ready to Win" ===
The competitor is then asked up to 15 multiple-choice questions, each worth a different amount. From 2009 there were two styles of play, one with three lifelines and one with four. In both styles of play, if the competitor answers a question correctly they will proceed to the next; if they answer incorrectly, they will win the amount of money at the last safe zone; if they retire they will win the amount of money from the previous question.

Three lifeline style of play

The three lifelines are "Phone a friend", where the competitor has 30 seconds on call to someone to help answer a question, "50/50", where the number of answer choices is reduced to two from four, and "Ask the audience", where the members of the audience each vote for which answer they believe is correct and the competitor can see all the votes. Each lifeline can only be used once, but more than one lifeline can be used per question. In this style of play, there are two safe zones, at question 5 and question 10.

Four lifeline style of play

The four lifelines include the three described above and "Ask One of the audience", where audience members who believe they know the correct answer can volunteer to help; the competitor chooses one to explain what they think the right answer is and why. Initially, if the audience member was correct, they also won up to Bs.F 3 This fourth lifeline could only be used once and only after question 5. It also removed the second safe zone, leaving only the one at question 5.

== Prizes ==
The prizes were:

Question	2000-2005	2005-2007	2008-2010	2011	2012-2014	2014-2015	2015-2016	Season 7 (used for most episode)
1	Bs.40,000	Bs.80,000	Bs.F 80	Bs.F 100	Bs.F 100	Bs.F 200	Bs.F 300	Bs.F 500
2	Bs.65,000	Bs.150,000	Bs.F 150	Bs.F 200	Bs.F 200	Bs.F 300	Bs.F 500	Bs.F 800
3	Bs.100,000	Bs.200,000	Bs.F 200	Bs.F 300	Bs.F 400	Bs.F 500	Bs.F 800	Bs.F 1,400
4	Bs.150,000	Bs.300,000	Bs.F 300	Bs.F 400	Bs.F 600	Bs.F 1,000	Bs.F 1,400	Bs.F 2,000
5 (safe zone)	Bs.250,000	Bs.500,000	Bs.F 500	Bs.F 600	Bs.F 1,000	Bs.F 1,500	Bs.F 2,000	Bs.F 3,500
6	Bs.400,000	Bs.700,000	Bs.F 700	Bs.F 1,000	Bs.F 1,500	Bs.F 2,000	Bs.F 3,000	Bs.F 5,000
7	Bs.650,000	Bs.1,100,000	Bs.F 1,100	Bs.F 1,500	Bs.F 2,000	Bs.F 3,000	Bs.F 5,000	Bs.F 8,000
8	Bs.1,100,000	Bs.1,800,000	Bs.F 1,800	Bs.F 2,500	Bs.F 4,000	Bs.F 5,000	Bs.F 8,000	Bs.F 12,000
9	Bs.1,800,000	Bs.3,000,000	Bs.F 3,000	Bs.F 4,000	Bs.F 6,000	Bs.F 7,000	Bs.F 12,000	Bs.F 20,000
10 (safe zone)	Bs.3,000,000	Bs.5,000,000	Bs.F 5,000	Bs.F 6,000	Bs.F 10,000	Bs.F 13,000	Bs.F 20,000	Bs.F 30,000
11	Bs.6,250,000	Bs.8,000,000	Bs.F 7,000	Bs.F 10,000	Bs.F 15,000	Bs.F 20,000	Bs.F 30,000	Bs.F 50,000
12	Bs.12,500,000	Bs.15,000,000	Bs.F 15,000	Bs.F 25,000	Bs.F 30,000	Bs.F 40,000	Bs.F 50,000	Bs.F 90,000
13	Bs.25,000,000	Bs.30,000,000	Bs.F 30,000	Bs.F 35,000	Bs.F 60,000	Bs.F 70,000	Bs.F 90,000	Bs.F 150,000
14	Bs.50,000,000	Bs.60,000,000	Bs.F 60,000	Bs.F 80,000	Bs.F 100,000	Bs.F 180,000	Bs.F 150,000	Bs.F 500,000
15	Bs.100,000,000	Bs.200,000,000	Bs.F 200,000	Bs.F 250,000	Bs.F 300,000	Bs.F 400,000	Bs.F 500,000	Bs.F 2,000,000

- In 2008, the prize was modified according to the monetary conversion to the hard bolívar.
- In 2014, the physical prize given by advertisers for using the "Phone a friend" lifeline was stopped.
- In 2015, the show stopped giving a car to grand prize winners.
