= Who Wants to Be a Millionaire (disambiguation) =

Who Wants to Be a Millionaire? is an international series of television game shows.

Who Wants to Be a Millionaire may also refer to:

== Television ==
- Who Wants to Be a Millionaire? (British game show), the original series
- Who Wants to Be a Millionaire? (American game show) and Who Wants to Be a Super Millionaire?
  - Who Wants to Be a Millionaire (1999 video game)
- Who Wants to Be a Millionaire? (Afghan game show)
- Who Wants to Be a Millionaire? (Australian game show)
- Ke Hotey Chay Kotipoti (Who Wants to Be a Millionaire?), a Bangladeshi game show
- Kaun Banega Crorepati (Who Wants to Be a Millionaire?), the Indian version of the game show (in Hindi)
  - Ke Hobe Banglar Kotipoti (Bengali)
  - Ke Bani Crorepati (Bhojpuri)
  - Kannadada Kotyadhipati (Kannada)
  - Kus Bani Koshur Karorpaet (Kashmiri)
  - Ningalkkum Aakaam Kodeeshwaran (Malayalam)
  - Kon Honar Crorepati (Marathi)
  - Neengalum Vellalam Oru Kodi (Tamil, 2012)
  - Kodeeswari (Tamil, 2019)
  - Evaru Meelo Koteeswarulu (Telugu)
- Who Wants to Be a Millionaire? (Irish game show)
- Who Wants to be a Millionaire? (Philippine game show)
- International versions of Who Wants to Be a Millionaire?

== Other uses ==
- "Who Wants to Be a Millionaire?" (song), by Cole Porter, which inspired all subsequent uses
- "Who Wants to Be a Millionaire?" (Only Fools and Horses), an episode of the TV show Only Fools and Horses
- Who Wants to Be a Millionaire – Play It!, a former attraction at Disney's theme parks
- Who Wants to Be a Millionaire (video game), a video game based on the show

== See also ==
- Crorepati (disambiguation)
- Slumdog Millionaire, a 2009 film adaptation of the novel Q & A which uses the game show as a major plot device
  - Q & A (novel), a 2005 novel by Vikas Swarup
- Who Wants to Beat Up a Millionaire?, a video game that parodies the game show
