= Siddhartha Basu =

Indian television personality

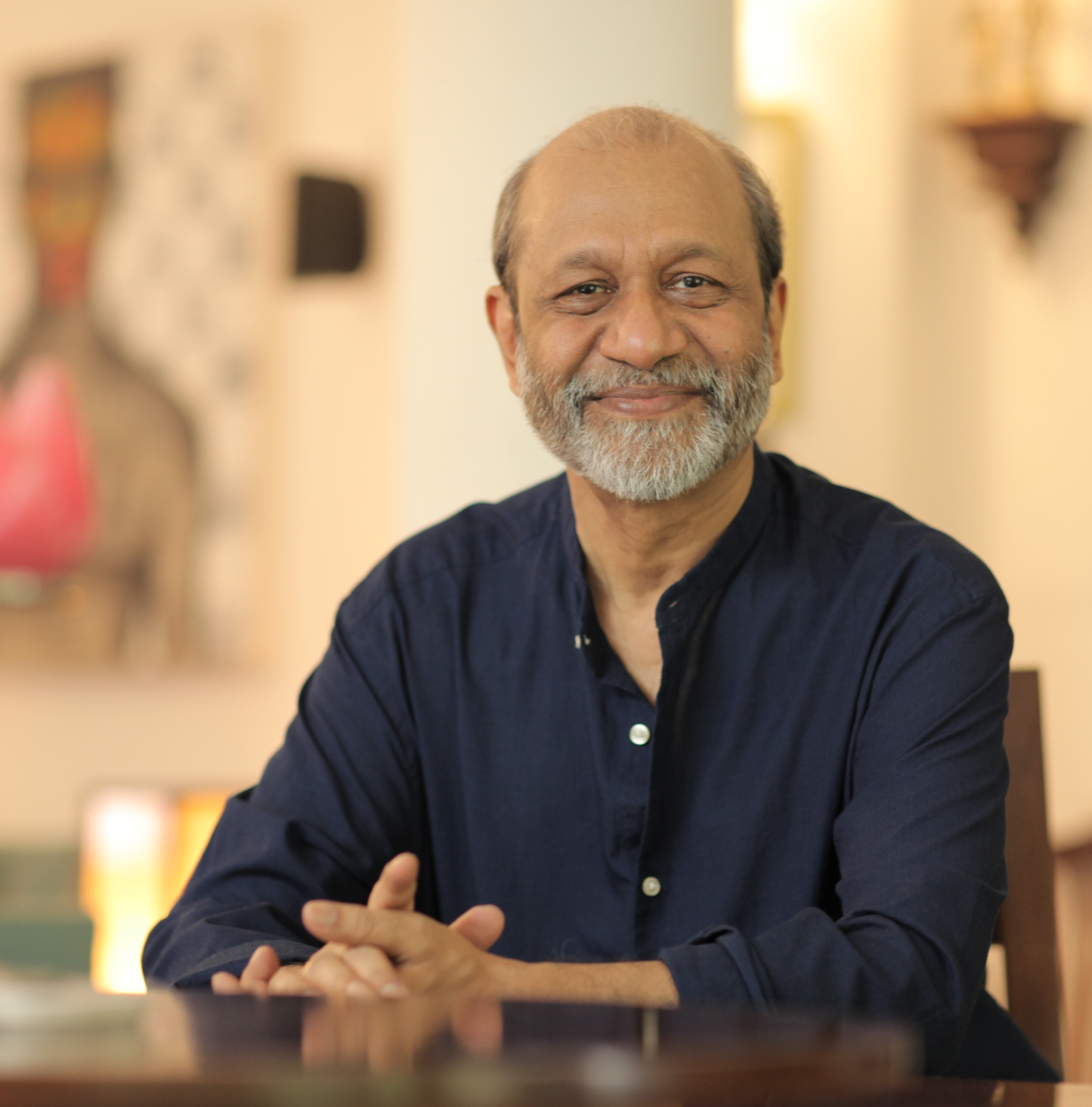
- Basu in 2017
- Born: 28 December 1954 (age 71); Kolkata, West Bengal, India
- Other name: Babu
- Education: St. Stephen's College, Delhi, University of Delhi
- Occupations: Television producer/director, quiz host
- Years active: 1985–present
- Notable work: Quiz Time, Mastermind India, Kaun Banega Crorepati
- Television: Quiz Time, Mastermind India, Kaun Banega Crorepati
- Spouse: Anita Kaul Basu (m. 1983)
- Children: 2
- Website: toknowledge.com

Siddhartha "Babu" Basu (born 1954), is an Indian actor, director, producer and quiz show host.

Regarded as a pioneer of Indian television quizzing, Basu rose to prominence with the show Quiz Time, and later on with the shows Mastermind India, University Challenge India and Quizzer of the Year.

He has produced and directed a number of Indian television shows including Kaun Banega Crorepati, Dus Ka Dum, Jhalak Dikhhla Jaa, and India's Got Talent.

Basu hosts The Quizzitok Podcast on YouTube and Spotify.

== Early life and education ==
Basu was born in Calcutta, India, into a Bengali Hindu family, and spent his childhood moving between Bombay, Delhi and Madras. He attended various schools in each city, including Besant Montessori and The Cathedral and John Connon School in Bombay, and Frank Anthony Public School in Delhi, before completing his schooling at the Kendriya Vidyalaya, IIT Madras.

He went on to earn a bachelor’s degree in English Literature from St. Stephen’s College, Delhi, followed by an M.A. in English Literature from Hindu College at the University of Delhi.

== Theatre ==
At St. Stephen’s College in the 1970s, Basu developed his passion for theatre. In 1973 he became a founding member of Barry John’s Theatre Action Group (TAG) in Delhi. Known as “Babu” among his peers, he acted in numerous stage plays – most memorably in the title role of Oedipus (Ted Hughes’ adaptation of Seneca's play), Polonius in Hamlet, and as Mozart in Amadeus. He also directed A Macbeth (for Red Curtain)and Equus ( for Ninth Facet- Anamika Kala Sangam) in Kolkata in 1975 & 1976 respectively.

TAG included several future stars (notably Shah Rukh Khan, Manoj Bajpayee, Mira Nair, Lillete Dubey, and a number of others), and in its first phase, Basu was noted as “one of its brightest lights”. Basu returned to the stage decades later in Mahesh Dattani’s Dance Like a Man, playing dual roles of Jayaraj and Amritlal in Prime Time's landmark production.

== Television career ==
Through his college days and after, Basu was active on All India Radio as a voice over artist, announcer and feature producer on its Yuva Vani and General Overseas Services programmes. Shortly after completing his master’s degree, Basu also worked as a documentary filmmaker for TV News Features (TVNF) starting in 1977, for about 8 years, directing numerous short features and popular science films such as Life Before Birth, Avalanches, Frozen in Silver, Moving Images, and Reading Rhesus Macaques.

He briefly worked as a 'cultural attache' for the Taj Group of Hotels from 1982-84. In 1985, he first hosted the inaugural "Quiz Time" programme on Doordarshan. It was a national inter-college quiz show, and featured notable contestants such as Rajdeep Sardesai, Raghuram Rajan, and Jayant Sinha. It quickly became a Sunday evening favourite on Doordarshan’s national network, then the only nationwide channel in the country (which was terrestrial) and was credited with popularizing quizzing across the country.

Along with his wife, former India Today journalist Anita Kaul Basu, he formed the media company Synergy Communications Pvt. Ltd. in Delhi in 1988, which in due course became Synergy Adlabs, then BIG Synergy - after its tie-up with Reliance Mediaworks. Promoted by Siddhartha, Anita Kaul Basu, and Karun Prabhakaran, BIG Synergy built its reputation as a leader in the field of factual entertainment, starting off as one of the country's first independent television production houses.

Following three seasons of Quiz Time (1985, 1986 and 1988), Basu both hosted, produced, and directed a number of shows, namely The India Quiz - The New Age (1989) on Doordarshan, India Quiz Series on Freedom at 50 (1990) on Doordarshan, Alpha Plus (1987) on Doordarshan, Spectrum - A 7-Nation SAARC Quiz (1987), Kissa Kursi Ka (1995), Akshar Mela (1995) on Doordarshan, The Beanstalk Quiz Summit (1997) on Doordarshan, Aao Guess Kare (1997) and, Jaane Kya Toone Kahi (1997) on Home TV, A Question of Answers (1998) on Star World, 3... 2... 1... (1999), Eureka (1999) on Star Plus, Mastermind India (1998-2002) on BBC World, Bluffmaster (2003) on Star One, Kamzor Kadii Kaun (2003) on Star TV, University Challenge India (2003-05) on BBC World, India's Child Genius (2004) on Star World, Howzzat (2004) on Tara Bangla, Heartbeat – Dil Thhaam Ke Khelo (2005) on Star One, Bollywood Ka Boss (2008) on Sahara Filmy, Dus Ka Dum (2008) on Sony Entertainment Television, Aap Ki Kachehri (2008–11) on Star Plus, Kya Aap Paanchvi Pass Se Tez Hain? (2008) on Star Plus, Sach Ka Saamna (2009–12) on Star Plus, Khelo Jeeto Jiyo (2009) on Star TV, Big Money (2010) on Imagine TV, Sports Ka Superstar (2010) on Doordarshan, Jawab Kinte Chai (2012) on Sananda TV, Tech Grandmasters (2012–13) on NDTV, Spell Bee India (2014–15) on Discovery Channel India, India Poochega Sabse Shaana Kaun? (2015) on &TV, News Wiz (2016-19) on India Today, The Big Picture (2021) on Colors TV, and Quizzer of the Year (2024) on SonyLIV, apart from the eight Indian regional adaptations of Kaun Banega Crorepati through the years.

Basu's biggest television success came in the form of Kaun Banega Crorepati (KBC), first produced for STAR Plus in 2000. KBC, as the show is also known, is the licensed Indian version of the globally successful format Who Wants to Be a Millionaire? with Bollywood star Amitabh Bachchan as its host. The second edition of the show began airing in August 2005 and notched up the highest-ever opening in the history of Indian television, going on to sustain its position among the most-watched programmes in the country. The third series of Kaun Banega Crorepati was hosted by Shah Rukh Khan in 2007. BIG Synergy produced the show till 2014, whereas Basu continued as a creative consultant on the show till 2021.

The first two seasons of Sony's hit show Jhalak Dikhhla Jaa, the Indian version of BBC's celebrity dance show, Strictly Come Dancing or Dancing with the Stars, was produced by BIG Synergy, as were the first two seasons of India's Got Talent, on Colors TV. Big Synergy has also produced other landmark shows such as Aap Ki Kachehri - Kiran Ke Saath (hosted by Kiran Bedi), Sacch Ka Saamna and Dus Ka Dum, with Salman Khan as host, on Sony Entertainment Television.

For two decades, Basu worked mainly behind the camera as Big Synergy’s CMD & creative head, but in 2024 he returned to hosting as the quizmaster of Quizzer of The Year (QOTY) on Sony LIV, India’s first all-digital national quiz contest aimed at students in grades IX–XII. As Basu explained in an interview, the contest allowed anyone to play daily via a mobile app, adding points to a leaderboard, and eventually leading to a virtual faceoff. The contest aimed to “buttress a factual culture” among youth. He remarked that, after not hosting since 2005, the producers invited him to return for the finals, which brought him back in front of the camera.

Beyond television, Basu and Anita have also launched Tree of Knowledge Pvt. Ltd. (TOK), an edutainment venture focused on quizzes, e-learning and publishing. Basu, through TOK has produced News Wiz, The Indiannica Quiz League on YouTube, Quizzer of the Year, and The Quizzitok Podcast on YouTube.

== Publications ==
Basu has authored and edited several books on quizzing and general knowledge. Early in his career, he co-compiled Inquizitive – The India Quiz Book (1989). He published multiple volumes of Mastermind India (1999–2004) – tie-in books for the quiz show, and in 2010 he co-wrote Kaun Banega Crorepati: The Official Book. Other titles include The Complete Mastermind India, Vol.1 (2002), Indian Century (for DK, 2018) and the Know for Sure and Knowledge Bee (for Encyclopaedia Britannica India, which later was acquired by Indiannica Learning) general knowledge book series for school students. These publications reflect Basu’s commitment to promoting knowledge and quizzing as educational tools.

Basu has also engaged in digital and live quizzing. He continues to host or promote live quizzes across India (including for students, corporates, even inmates in Tihar jail) and to run online quiz leagues. His work is often described as building a “knowledge community and promoting factual culture” – connecting people of all ages through informed questioning. In podcasts and interviews he emphasizes quizzing’s breadth, rejecting the idea of it as mere “trivia” and aiming instead to foster curiosity about culture, history and science. In 2025, Basu appeared on Amit Varma’s Seen and the Unseen podcast, where he was introduced as a “legend of the quizzing world” reflecting on life and the art of asking questions.

== App development ==
In 2023, Basu, the TOK team, and Sony Liv developed Quizzer of the Year (QOTY), an open quiz platform on the Sony Liv app. The application is designed as a scalable and flexible knowledge-based platform with feature-rich, interactive games suitable for multiple cohorts. Key features include instant leaderboards for benchmarking progress, multilingual support in English, Hindi, and other languages, detailed analysis and game reports for review, multimedia integration with audio, video, and images, batch registrations, and instant digital certificates and prizes.

== Film acting ==
Although known primarily for television, Basu has done a few character roles in Indian films. He made his on-screen acting debut as R&AW Chief Robin Dutt (code-named “RD”) in Shoojit Sircar’s thriller Madras Cafe (2013). He later played a barrister/mayor (Romi Mehta) in Anurag Kashyap’s Bombay Velvet (2015), and even portrayed the President of India in the Malayalam film How Old Are You? (2014) – a role that was reprised in the Tamil remake 36 Vayadhinile (2015). Basu also appeared in the role of India’s External Affairs Minister in the 2017 blockbuster Tiger Zinda Hai.

In 2025, he made a cameo appearance in Boman Irani’s directorial debut The Mehta Boys.

He is a creative consultant with Applause Entertainment on an epic web series about Mahatma Gandhi, directed by Hansal Mehta.

== Personal life ==
Siddhartha Basu is married to Anita Kaul (now Anita Kaul Basu). Anita was a journalist with India Today (1983–88) before co-founding Synergy with Basu in 1988. The couple has two children: a son, Aditya, who works in the Hindi film industry; and a daughter, Medha, who has been working with international organizations in public policy and programmes. Basu often credits Anita for handling the business and logistics at Synergy, enabling him to focus on creative work.

After decades leading BIG Synergy, Basu gradually stepped back from day-to-day management. In 2016, he officially relinquished his positions as Director, becoming a consultant and mentor, before signing off completely in 2018. Today, he is based in Delhi and remains active through Tree of Knowledge, DigiTOK and his quiz ventures. He is widely respected for his integrity and dedication: colleagues describe him as a “strict umpire” who insists on high standards, and media profiles emphasize his role in transforming quizzing from a niche pursuit into mainstream entertainment.

== Awards & recognition ==
In 2010, BIG Synergy was named "Production House of the Year" at the Indian Television Awards.

In 2011, the BIG Synergy team won the "Indian of the Year – Entertainment" award of CNN-IBN.

== Legacy and influence ==
Over four decades, Siddhartha Basu has had a formative influence on Indian quizzing and television. He is often called the "Father of Indian TV quizzing" for his role in creating, hosting and producing popular quiz programmes.

As journalist Udita Jhunjhunwala wrote in Mint, Basu is "most famous for championing formats that test general knowledge", whether on TV or online.

In 2024, Amitabh Bachchan noted Basu's calm rigour behind the camera.

== Television credits ==
| Year(s) | Title | Language | Season(s) | Host | Producer | Host (if others) | Broadcaster | Notes |
|---|---|---|---|---|---|---|---|---|
| 1985–86, 1988 | Quiz Time | English | 1–3 | Yes | Yes | - | Doordarshan | |
| 1989 | The India Quiz - The New Age | English | 1 | Yes | Yes | - | Doordarshan | |
| 1990 | India Quiz Series on Freedom at 50 | English | 1 | Yes | Yes | - | Doordarshan | |
| 1993 | Alpha Plus | | 1 | No | Yes | Bhaskar Bhattacharya | Doordarshan | |
| 1994 | Spectrum - A 7-Nation SAARC Quiz | English | 1 | Yes | Yes | - | Doordarshan | |
| 1995 | Akshar Mela | Hindi | 1 - 2 | No | Yes | Joy Sengupta, Divya Seth | Doordarshan | |
| 1995 | Manch Masala | Hindi | 1 | No | Yes | Ravi Baswani | Doordarshan Metro | |
| 1997 | The Beanstalk Quiz Summit | English | 1 | Yes | Yes | - | Doordarshan | |
| 1997 | Aao Guess Kare | Hindi | 1 | No | Yes | Divya Seth | Home TV | |
| 1997 | Jaane Kya Toone Kahi | Hindi | 1 | No | Yes | Vandana Kilam, Ranganathan | Home TV | |
| 1998 | Kissa Kursi Ka | Hindi | 1 | No | Yes | Annu Kapoor | Zee TV | |
| 1998 | A Question of Answers | English | 1 | No | Yes | Vir Sanghvi | Star World | |
| 1998–2002 | Mastermind India | English | 1–5 | Yes | Yes | - | BBC World | |
| 1999 | 3... 2... 1... | | 1 | yes | Yes | | Star Plus | |
| 1999 | Eureka | | 1 | No | Yes | Partha Ghosh | Star Plus | |
| 2000–2021 | Kaun Banega Crorepati | Hindi | 1–13 | No | Yes | Amitabh Bachchan, Shah Rukh Khan | Star Plus / Sony TV | |
| 2003 | Bluffmaster | Hindi | 1 | No | Yes | Vinod Sharawat | Star One | |
| 2003 | Kamzor Kadii Kaun | Hindi | 1 | No | Yes | Neena Gupta | Star Plus | |
| 2003–2004 | University Challenge India | English | 1–2 | Yes | Yes | - | BBC World | |
| 2004 | India's Child Genius | English | 1 | Yes | Yes | - | Star World | |
| 2004 | Howzzat | Bengali | 1 | No | Yes | June Malia, Neel Mukherjee | Tara Bangla | |
| 2005 | Heartbeat – Dil Thhaam Ke Khelo | Hindi | 1 | No | Yes | Mohan Kapur | Star One | |
| 2005 | Style Today | English | | | Yes | Malvika Tiwari | DD Metro | |
| 2006-07 | Jhalak Dikhla Jaa | Hindi | 2 | | Yes | Archana Puran Singh, Parmeet Sethi, Mona Singh, Rohit Roy | Sony Entertainment Television | |
| 2006-07 | Mum Tum Aur Hum | Hindi | 2 | | Yes | Shruti Seth | Star Plus | |
| 2006 | Savithri | Hindi | | | Yes | | | |
| 2008 | Angrezi Mein Kehte Hain | Hindi | | | Yes | Shernaz Patel | Imagine TV | |
| 2008 | Bollywood Ka Boss | Hindi | 1 | No | Yes | Boman Irani | Sahara Filmy | |
| 2008 | Jiya Jale | | | | Yes | Sriti Jha, Saurabh Tiwari | 9X | |
| 2008 | Champs | | | | Yes | | Bindaas TV | |
| 2008-09 | 10 Ka Dum | Hindi | 2 | No | Yes | Salman Khan | Sony TV | |
| 2008–2011 | Aap Ki Kachehri | Hindi | 1–3 | No | Yes | Kiran Bedi | Star Plus | |
| 2008 | Kya Aap Paanchvi Pass Se Tez Hain? | Hindi | 1 | No | Yes | Shah Rukh Khan | Star Plus | |
| 2009–12 | Sacch Ka Saamna | Hindi | 1–2 -3 | No | Yes | Rajeev Khandelwal | Star Plus | |
| 2009-10 | India's Got Talent | Hindi | | | Yes | Ayushmann Khurana, Nikhil Chinappa | Colors TV | |
| 2009 | Khelo Jeeto Jiyo | Hindi | 1 | No | Yes | Soha Ali Khan | Star TV | |
| 2010 | Game Aadi Life Change Maadi | Kannada | | | Yes | Bhavana Ramanna | | |
| 2010 | Big Money | Hindi | 1 | No | Yes | R. Madhavan | Imagine TV | |
| 2010 | Vaazhvai Maatralam Vanga | Tamil | | | Yes | Vijayalakshmi | | |
| 2010 | Dream Home Aadandi Life Marchukondi | | | | Yes | | | |
| 2010 | Sports Ka Superstar | Hindi | 1 | No | Yes | Mini Mathur | Doordarshan | |
| 2011 | Simi Selects India's Most Desirable | English | | | | Simi Garewal | Star World | |
| 2012 | Foodistan | English | | | Yes | Ira Dubey, Alyy Khan | NDTV Good Times | |
| 2012 | Ke Hobe Banglar Kotipoti | Bengali | | | Yes | Saurav Ganguly | Mahua Bangla | |
| 2012 | Jawab Kinte Chai | Bengali | 1 | No | Yes | Mir Afsar Ali | Sananda TV | |
| 2012 | Ke Bani Crorepati | Bhojpuri | | | Yes | Shatrughan Sinha | Mahua Bhojpuri | |
| 2012 | Hindustan ke Hunarbaaz | Hindi | | | Yes | Paras Tomar | Life OK | |
| 2012 | Laakhon Mein Ek | Hindi | | | Yes | | Star Plus | |
| 2012–13 | Tech Grand Masters | English | 1–2 | No | Yes | Rajiv Makhni | NDTV | |
| 2014 | Connexions | Tamil | | | Yes | Jagan | Star Vijay | |
| 2014 | Connexions | Telugu | | | Yes | | Maa TV | |
| 2014 | Evaru Meelo Koteeswarulu | Telugu | | | Yes | Nagarjuna, Chiranjeevi | Maa TV | |
| | Kannadada Kotyadhipati | Kannada | | | Yes | Puneeth Rajkumar, Ramesh Arvind | Star Suvarna | |
| 2012-13, 2015, 2017 | Ningalkkum Aakaam Kodeeshwaran | Malayalam | 1-4 | | Yes | Suresh Gopi | Asianet | |
| 2012-13, 16 | Neengalum Vellalam Oru Kodi | Tamil | 1-3 | | Yes | Suriya, Prakash Raj, Arvind Swamy | Star Vijay | |
| 2014–15 | Spell Bee India | English | 1–3 | No | Yes | Soha Ali Khan | Discovery Channel | |
| 2013-23 | Kon Honar Crorepati | Marathi | 1 | | Yes | Sachin Khedekar | Colors Marathi, Sony Marathi | |
| 2015 | India Poochega Sabse Shaana Kaun? | Hindi | 1 | No | Yes | Shah Rukh Khan | &TV | |
| 2015-16 | Sell Me The Answer | Malayalam | 2 | No | Yes | Mukesh, Suraj Venjaramoodu | Asianet | |
| 2015 | Fastest Family First - Adi Mone Buzzer | Malayalam | 1 | No | Yes | Govind Padmasoorya | Asianet | |
| 2016–19 | News Wiz | English | 1–4 | No | Yes | Rajdeep Sardesai | India Today TV | |
| 2019 | Kus Bani Koshur Karorpaet | Kashmiri | 1 | No | Yes | Rayees Mohiuddin | Doordarshan Kashir | |
| 2019 | The Lallantop Quiz | Hindi | 1 | No | Yes | Saurabh Dwivedi | | |
| 2021 | The Big Picture | Hindi | 1 | No | Yes | Ranveer Singh | Colors TV | |
| 2024 | Quizzer of the Year (QOTY) | English | 1 | Yes | Yes | - | SonyLIV | |

== Books ==
- Inquizitive -The India Quiz Book. Seagull Books Pvt. Ltd., 1989. ISBN 81-7046-067-0
- Mastermind India with Siddhartha Basu. Teksons Bookshop in association with BBC Worldwide Ltd, 1999. ISBN 0-563-55197-6.
- Mastermind India 2. Penguin Books India in association with BBC Worldwide, 2000. ISBN 0-141-00462-2.
- Mastermind India 3. Penguin Books India in association with BBC Worldwide, 2001. ISBN 0-14-302768-9.
- The Complete Mastermind India, Vol. 1. Penguin Books India, 2002. ISBN 0-67-004948-4.
- Mastermind India 4. Penguin Books India and BBC Worldwide, 2003. ISBN 014302940-1.
- Mastermind India 5. Penguin Books India and BBC Worldwide, 2004. ISBN 0-14-303051-5.
- Kaun Banega Crorepati - The Official Book. Rupa, 2010. ISBN 978-81-291-1686-4
- Know for Sure (Volume 1-8). Encyclopædia Britannica South Asia. ISBN 81-8131-262-7.
- Indian Century. Dorling Kindersley Publishing Pvt. Ltd., 2018 ISBN 978-0-2413-1747-1.
- Knowledge Bee (Volume 1-8). Indiannica Learning Pvt. Ltd., 2024. ISBN 978-81-962974-3-5

== Filmography ==
| Year | Film | Role | Language |
|---|---|---|---|
| 2013 | Madras Cafe | Robin Dutt (RD), R&AW Chief | Hindi |
| 2014 | How Old Are You? | President of India | Malayalam |
| 2015 | 36 Vayadhinile | President of India | Tamil |
| 2015 | Bombay Velvet | Romi Mehta, Barrister & Mayor of Bombay | Hindi |
| 2017 | Tiger Zinda Hai | Indian Minister of External Affairs | Hindi |
| 2025 | The Mehta Boys | Saumik Sen, Amay's boss and head of Sen & Sons | Hindi |

== Podcasting ==
Siddhartha Basu is the host of The Quizzitok Podcast, streaming on YouTube and Spotify.

| Episode | Guest(s) | Note | Link |
|---|---|---|---|
| 1 | Joy Bhattacharjya | Joy Bhattacharjya discusses his journey in Indian sports, quizzing, and storytelling. Topics include Shahrukh Khan's leadership in the IPL, the growth of volleyball in India, and the enduring importance of general knowledge | Video on YouTube |
| 2 | Rajiv Makhni | Rajiv Makhni, India’s best-known tech presenter, talks about his journey from a tech-obsessed childhood to becoming the country’s “Tech Guru.” He shares why he calls himself an “Un-Influencer,” reflects on digital overload, and stresses the need for mindful tech detox. | Video on YouTube |
| 3 | Archana G. Gupta, K.E. Priyamvada, Dayita B. Datta | Three powerhouse quizzers—Archana Garodia Gupta, Priyamvada K.E., and Dayita Bira Datta—come together to share what it takes to win Mastermind India. They take us inside the rigors of the Mind Sport, from late-night reading marathons to razor-sharp recall under pressure. Each shares her personal journey of mastering the format and making a lasting mark on the quizzing world. | Video on YouTube |
| 4 | Vikas Swarup | Vikas Swarup delves into the making of 'Slumdog Millionaire,' his experiences with Somali pirates, and the life lessons he's learned along the way. | Video on YouTube |
| 5 | Col. Vembu Shankar | Colonel Vembu Shankar, a decorated Indian Army veteran and Shaurya Chakra awardee, joins Siddhartha Basu to explore themes of courage, curiosity, and service. He shares his transition from military life to quizzing and how he founded Project Sambandh, a non-profit rooted in community empowerment—revealing the deeper purpose behind his journey | Video on YouTube |
| 6 | Derek O'Brien | Derek O’Brien shares insights into his family's legacy in quizzing, the evolution of TV quiz shows, and how quizzing has transformed from a parlor game to a national movement. | Video on YouTube |
| 7 | Devdutt Pattanaik | Devdutt Pattanaik explores the concept of Ahimsa, the role of mythology in modern life, and how ancient stories can provide insights into contemporary issues. | Video on YouTube |
| 8 | Rajdeep Sardesai | Veteran journalist Rajdeep Sardesai reflects on his cricket heritage stemming from his legendary father Dilip Sardesai, and discusses how sports influenced his worldview. The episode also dives into his experiences covering major elections, highlighting the rising tide of misinformation and the evolving landscape of Indian democracy. | Video on YouTube |
| 9 | Shashi Tharoor | Dr. Shashi Tharoor engages in a delightful conversation about language, literature, and global issues, sharing his perspectives as a diplomat, author, and politician. | Video on YouTube |
| 10 | Vir Sanghvi | Vir Sanghvi discusses his journey in journalism and food writing, sharing stories from his illustrious career and insights into the art of storytelling. | Video on YouTube |
| 11 | Ramachandra Guha | Historian and author Dr. Ramachandra Guha brings his deeply reflective insight to a conversation that spans his fascination with Gandhi, the significance of cricket in Indian culture, and the intellectual path that shaped his career. The episode weaves together personal anecdotes and historical perspective, painting a rich portrait of modern Indian history | Video on YouTube |
| 12 | Soha Ali Khan | Soha Ali Khan offers a candid conversation about her journey from Oxford to Bollywood, discussing her experiences beyond the glitz of the film industry and the weight of royal heritage. | Video on YouTube |
| 13 | Arun Kapur | Arun Kapur shares his experiences in education, discussing his work at Vasant Valley School, his insights into the educational system in Bhutan, and his vision for the future of education. | Video on YouTube |
