= Kus Bani Koshur Karorpaet =

Indian Kashmiri-language television game show

- Logo of the game
- Kashmiri: کُس بَنہِ کٲشُر کَرور پٔتؠ
- Directed by: Arjun Karthikeyan
- Creative director: Mohiuddin Mirza
- Presented by: Rayees Mohiuddin
- Country of origin: India
- Original language: Kashmiri
- No. of seasons: 1
- No. of episodes: 60

Production
- Executive producer: Gajender Das
- Running time: 47–60 minutes
- Production companies: Studio NEXT; Tree of Knowledge (Digi TOK) (Note: Co-producing as a consulting producer only.)

Original release
- Network: DD Kashir
- Release: 29 April – 6 July 2019

Kus Bani Koshur Karorpaet (transl. Who will Become a Kashmiri Millionaire) is an Indian Kashmiri-language television game show based on Kaun Banega Crorepati. It premiered on 29 April 2019. It had its finale episode aired on 6 July 2019. It is hosted by Rayees Mohiuddin. The show is broadcast on Doordarshan Kashir. On 3 July 2019, muppets Chamki and Grover from the Indian adaptation of Sesame Street, Galli Galli Sim Sim which airs on national sister channel Doordarshan National, made a crossover appearance in the 56th episode of the show by speaking in Hinglish.

== See also ==
- Doordarshan
- Prasar Bharati
- Kashmiri cinema
- Jammu and Kashmir
- Kaun Banega Crorepati
- Kon Honar Crorepati
- Neengalum Vellalam Oru Kodi
- Ningalkkum Aakaam Kodeeshwaran
- Kannadada Kotyadhipati
- Meelo Evaru Koteeswarudu
- Ko Banchha Crorepati
- Ke Bani Crorepati
- Ke Hobe Banglar Kotipoti
- International versions of Who Wants to Be a Millionaire?
