= BIG Synergy =

Television production company

Big Synergy
- Industry: Entertainment
- Founded: 24 February 1988
- Headquarters: Oshiwara, Andheri (West), Mumbai
- Key people: Rajiv Bakshi (CEO)
- Products: Television programs (fiction & non-fiction), web series, short films
- Parent: Reliance Entertainment

Big Synergy Media Limited is a television production company headed by chief executive officer Rajiv Bakshi. It started as one of the country's first few independent television outfits in 1988. BIG Synergy is an acknowledged leader in factual entertainment in India. It has produced some of India's most popular and critically acclaimed factual entertainment shows.

The company is famous for producing Kaun Banega Crorepati, India's biggest television quiz show, hosted by Amitabh Bachchan.

== New shows (2017–2018) ==
- Kaushiki with VuClip, Viu, directed by Suparn Verma; creative producer Namit Sharma; starring Rannvijay Singh
- Bose: Dead/Alive with Alt Digital Media Entertainment; directed by Pulkit and Hansal Mehta; starring Rajkumar Rao; produced By Ekta Kapoor
- Yo kay Hua Bro with Voot Originals; creative producer Namit Sharma; starring Shamita Shetty, Aparshakti Khurana
- India's Best Jobs-Season 1 & 2 with Discovery Channel, creative producer Namit Sharma; host Meiyang Chang
- News Wiz Quiz Show with India Today, hosted by Rajdeep Sardesai
- People's Choice in Malayalam language, aired on Asianet Channel

== Shows ==
Year	TV series	Network	Details	Host	Language
2009	Vazhvai Mattralaam Vaanga	Sun TV	Tamil version of Khelo Jeeto Jiyo	Vijaylakshmi	Tamil
2009	Adandi Life Marchukondi	Gemini TV	Telugu version of Khelo Jeeto Jiyo	Archana Shastri	Telugu
2010	Game Adi Life Change Madi	Udaya TV	Kannada version of Khelo Jeeto Jiyo	Bhavna Ramana	Kannada
2011	Ke Bani Crorepati	Mahuaa TV	Bhojpuri version of Kaun Banega Crorepati	Shatrughan Sinha	Bhojpuri
2011	Ke Hobe Banglar Kotipoti	Mahuaa Bangla	Bengali version of Kaun Banega Crorepati	Sourav Ganguly	Bengali
2012	Jabab Kinte Chai	Sananda TV	Bengali version of Sell Me the Answer	Mir Afsar Ali	Bengali
2012	Neengalum Vellalaam Oru Kodi	STAR Vijay	Tamil version of Kaun Banega Crorepati	Suriya	Tamil
2012	Ningalkkum Aakaam Kodeeshwaran	Asianet	Malayalam version of Kaun Banega Crorepati	Suresh Gopi	Malayalam
2012	Kannadada Kotyadhipati	Asianet Suvarna	Kannada version of Kaun Banega Crorepati	Puneeth Rajkumar	Kannada
2013	Ningalkkum Aakaam Kodeeshwaran	Asianet	Malayalam version of Kaun Banega Crorepati	Suresh Gopi	Malayalam
2013	Neengalum Vellalaam Oru Kodi	STAR Vijay	Tamil version of Kaun Banega Crorepati	Prakash Raj	Tamil
2013	Connexion	Star Vijay	Game/quiz show	Suma Kanakala	Tamil
2014	Meelo Evaru Koteeswarudu	Maa TV	Telugu version of Kaun Banega Crorepati	Nagarjuna	Telugu
2014–2015	Ningalkkum Aakaam Kodeeshwaran	Asianet	Malayalam version of Kaun Banega Crorepati	Suresh Gopi	Malayalam
2015–2017	Connexion	Star Vijay	Game show	Jagan	Tamil
2015	Sell Me the Answer (Season 1)	Asianet	Malayalam version of Sell Me the Answer	Mukesh	Malayalam
2015	Meelo Evaru Koteeswarudu	Maa TV	Telugu version of Kaun Banega Crorepati	Nagarjuna	Telugu
2016	Adi Mone Buzzer Fastest Family First	Asianet	Game show	Govind Padmasoorya (GP)	Malayalam
2016	Sell Me the Answer Season 2	Asianet	Malayalam version of Sell Me the Answer	Mukesh	Malayalam
2016	Neengalum Vellalaam Oru Kodi	STAR Vijay	Tamil version of Kaun Banega Crorepati	Arvind Swamy	Tamil
2017–present	Ningalkkum Aakaam Kodeeshwaran	Asianet	Malayalam version of Kaun Banega Crorepati	Suresh Gopi	Malayalam
2017–present	Meelo Evaru Koteeswarudu	Star Maa	Telugu version of Kaun Banega Crorepati	Nagarjuna	Telugu
2017–present	Meelo Evaru Koteeswarudu(Season 4)	Star Maa	Telugu version of Kaun Banega Crorepati	Chiranjeevi	Telugu
