= Ningalkkum Aakaam Kodeeshwaran =

Indian Malayalam game show

- Genre: Game show
- Presented by: Suresh Gopi
- Composers: Keith Strachan; Matthew Strachan (2012-2020); Ramon Covalo; Nick Magnus (2012 - 2020); Sawan Dutta (2014-2015); Ajay-Atul (2019-2020)
- Country of origin: India
- Original language: Malaylam
- No. of seasons: 5
- No. of episodes: 444

Production
- Running time: 60 minutes
- Production company: BIG Synergy (Season 1-4) Studio NEXT (Season 5)

Original release
- Network: Asianet (seasons 1-4); Mazhavil Manorama (season 5)
- Release: 9 April 2012 – 31 March 2020

Ningalkkum Aakaam Kodeeshwaran (transl. You, Too, Can Be a Millionaire) is an Indian Malayalam-language quiz show. It is an adaptation of the original British game show Who Wants to Be a Millionaire? and its Hindi version, Kaun Banega Crorepati. The show is hosted by actor Suresh Gopi.

== Series overview ==
Season	Main Host	Channel	Originally Aired		Episodes	Special
Season	Main Host	Channel	Launch Day	Final Day	Episodes	Special
1	Suresh Gopi	Asianet	9 April 2012	23 August 2012	80	—N/a
2	Suresh Gopi	Asianet	4 March 2013	18 July 2013	80	Kodeeshwaran KIDS / Junior
3	Suresh Gopi	Asianet	29 December 2014	2015	100	Kodeeshwaran KIDS / Junior
4	Suresh Gopi	Asianet	16 January 2017	23 June 2017	102	Kodeeshwaran KIDS / Junior
5	Suresh Gopi	Mazhavil Manorama	11 November 2019	31 March 2020	82	—N/a

== Background ==
In 2011, Business Standard announced that Kaun Banega Crorepati was going to be remade into five regional Indian languages. Suresh Gopi was selected to host the Malayalam version and was quoted saying:

Expecting and hoping that Ningalkkum Aakam Kodeeshwaran would be really very big in Kerala... It was a really enriching and rewarding experience to get trained under Siddhartha Basu, with support from the Big Synergy and Asianet team to get into this new role, as a Host for the No. 1 game show in the World.

The episodes for Ningalkkum Aakam Kodeeshwaran were shot at AVM Studios in Chennai, where its Tamil equivalent Neengalum Vellalam Oru Kodi was also shot and Kannadada Kotyadhipati, where its Kannada equivalent was also filmed.

== Production ==
=== Season 1 ===
Shyla CK, a contestant from Idukki, was the first person to win ₹50,00,000/- on the show, the highest amount won in the season. Shyla correctly answered the 14th question worth ₹50 lakhs/-, but she quit on the final question.

The tagline used for the season was Oru Chodyam Madi Jeevidam Mari Marayan (English: One Question Is Enough For Life To Change).

==== Celebrity guests ====
No.	Date	Guest(s)	Amount won	Notes
1	8, 9 May 2012	Suraj Venjaramoodu	₹3,20,000/-	First celebrity to play In the first season
2	21 May 2012	Kavya Madhavan	₹3,20,000/-	Played just after the 50 lakhs winner Shyla
3	7 June 2012	Samvritha Sunil	₹3,20,000/-	Quit the show due to the film shoot after getting to the second safe zone
4	28 June 2012	K. S. Chithra	₹3,20,000/-	Sang in the show
5	3, 4 July 2012	Jayaram & Parvathy	₹6,40,000/-	Appeared on the 50th episode of the show, first Double Celebrity episode
6	2 August 2012	Guinness Pakru & Ranjini Haridas	₹3,20,000/-	Second Double Celebrity episode
7	15 August 2012	Vijay Yesudas & Swetha Mohan	₹3,20,000/-	Appeared on Independence Day

=== Season 2 ===
Second season started on 4 March 2013. Sangeetha, a handicapped woman from Painavu, had scored ₹25,00,000/- in the 3rd day of the 2nd season. For the first time in the history of the show, the season started 'All Asianet Serial Celebrities Week' which started from 15 April 2013. Sanooja Rajan was declared as the first Crorepati of the show. This sparkling moment was aired on Asianet on 30 April 2013.

The tagline used for the season was Orarivum Cheruthalla, Deyvathinte Varamaanu (English: No Knowledge is Small, It Is The Blessing Of God)

==== Celebrity guests ====
No.	Date	Guest(s)	Amount won	Notes
1	7 March 2013	Shweta Menon	₹3,20,000/-	Appeared on the day before International Women's Day
2	28 March 2013	Rimi Tomy	₹1,60,000/-	Appeared on the Maundy Thursday
3	15 April 2013	Rajeev Parameswaran & Shemi Martin	₹6,40,000/-	All Asianet serial celebrities week
4	15–16 April 2013	Shanavas Shanu & Shelly Kishore	₹6,40,000/-	All Asianet serial celebrities week
5	16–17 April 2013	Shaju Kalabhavan & Fathimath Rasana	₹3,20,000/-	All Asianet serial celebrities week
6	17–18 April 2013	Sarath & Anupama Meera	₹6,40,000/-	All Asianet serial celebrities week
7	18 April 2013	Sajan & Anjana Haridas	₹3,20,000/-	All Asianet serial celebrities week
8	16 May 2013	Madhu	₹3,20,000/-	Oldest celebrity ever
9	6 June 2013	Manoj K Jayan & Vineeth	₹6,40,000/-	First double-male episode
10	26–27 June 2013	Najim Arshad & Kalpana Raghavendra	₹1,60,000/-	Idea Star Singer winners
11	27 June 2013	Vivekanandan & Merin Gregory	₹1,60,000/-	Idea Star Singer winners
12	4 July 2013	Asif Ali & Nadirshah	₹3,20,000/-	
13	18 July 2013	Asha Sarath & Sudha Chandran	₹3,20,000/-	Appeared on the closing episode of season 2 of the show

==== Kids Special Episode ====
For the first time in the history of NAK, the "Kids special episode" started on Asianet from 27 May onwards. It was also continued from 8 July 2013 due to the request of the audience.

No.	Date	Students	Amount won	School	Place
1	27 May 2013	Mithu & Anila	₹12,50,000/-	Netaji Higher Secondary School	Pathanamthitta
2	27–28 May 2013	Samil & Faheema	₹3,20,000/-	G.M.U.P School	Malappuram
3	28 May 2013	Nandini & Goutham	₹20,000/-	Christ Nagar Higher Secondary School	Thiruvananthapuram
4	28–29 May 2013	Snehamol & Vishnu	₹3,20,000/-	A K G Memorial Government Higher Secondary School	Kannur
5	29–30 May 2012	Reshmi & Namitha	₹6,40,000/-	St. Vincent Colony Girls HS	Kozhikode
6	30 May 2013	Gopika & Alan	₹6,40,000/-	Government Higher Secondary School	Kasargodu
7	8 July 2013	Arshel & Amritha	₹3,20,000/-	St. Joseph High School	Kannur
8	8–9 July 2013	Ajay & Lija	₹3,20,000/-	St. George High School	Alappuzha
9	9–10 July 2013	Vijayalakshmi & Shahbas	₹1,60,000/-	Jayarani Public School	Idukki
10	10 July 2013	Gopika & Nanditha	₹80,000/-	Government Girls Higher Secondary School	Kottayam
11	10–11 July 2013	Arjun & Haritha	₹6,40,000/-	Government Higher Secondary School	Palakkad
12	11 July 2013	Priya & Ranjan	₹10,000/-	Bhavan's Vidya Mandir	Wayanadu

=== Season 3 ===
The third season kicked off from 29 December 2014 with the inaugural song of K S Chitra. This season started with a few differences from the last seasons. The timer from 1-5 questions was made 45 seconds and from 6-10 is 60 seconds. Also this season had the introduction of a new lifeline called 'Double Dip' replacing 'Fifty-Fifty (50/50)' from the previous seasons. This season also featured a fourth additional lifeline (not included as the main lifeline) called 'Code Red' which gave the opportunity for the contestant's family members to warn the contestant if they feel the answer is wrong and also a new intro, and a half part of the soundtrack was replaced.

==== Celebrity guests ====
No.	Date	Guest(s)	Amount won	Notes
1	1 January 2015	Namitha Pramod	₹1,60,000/-	Appeared on New Year's Day
2	19 February 2015	Amala Paul	₹6,40,000/-	
3	2 March 2015	Chithra Shenoy & Divya Padmini	₹3,20,000/-	All Asianet serial celebrities week
4	3 March 2015	Gayatri Arun & Sneha	₹3,20,000/-	All Asianet serial celebrities week
5	4 March 2015	Roopa Sri & Meghna Vincent	₹3,20,000/-	All Asianet serial celebrities week
6	5 March 2015	Gauri & Niya	₹6,40,000/-	All Asianet serial celebrities week
7	12 March 2015	Ramesh Pisharody & Dharmajan Bolgatty	₹3,20,000/-	
8	19 March 2015	Tini Tom & Kalabhavan Shajon	₹3,20,000/-	

==== Ningalkkum Aakam Kodeeshwaran (KIDS) ====
No.	Date	Student(s)	Amount won	District	Notes
1	11 May 2015	Aswin Joseph & Nithya	₹6,40,000/-	Govt. HSS, Kalpetta, Wayanad	
2	12 May 2015	Aswin & Krishnapriya	₹10,000/-	Vyasa Vidyanikethan Central School, Chalakudy, Thrissur	
3	13 May 2015	Abhimanyu Unnikrishnan & Hridya	₹3,20,000/-	Govt.HSS Kuttippuram, Malappuram	
4	14 May 2015	Bilal Husaain & Swaliha	₹1,60,000/-	GHSS, Koothuparambu, Kannur	

=== Season 4 ===
Asianet announced the fourth season of NAK in late 2016. The first question for entry was published on the channel 7 November 2016 at 6:30 pm. Suresh Gopi hosted the fourth season. The show was launched on 16 January 2017 with Sujatha Mohan and Swetha Mohan rendering the inaugural song (Allah thero Naah) with minor changes, new graphics, intro and update for studio, lifeline Double Dip was removed and lifeline Fifty-fifty (50/50) was restored.

==== Celebrity guests ====
No.	Date	Guest(s)	Amount won	Notes
1	2 February	Sujatha Mohan and Swetha Mohan	₹1,60,000/-	
2	14 February	Miya	₹1,60,000/-	Valentine's Day special episode
3	22–27 February	Innocent	₹6,40,000/-	
4	8 March	Chippy Renjith and Gayatri Arun	₹ 80,000	Women's day special episode
5	16 March	Anusree	₹1,60,000/-	
6	27, 28 March	Rajisha Vijayan and Aparna Balamurali	₹3,20,000/-	
7	6 April	Rekha Ratheesh		
8	10 April	Roopa Sree, Meghna Vincent		
9	11 April	Sneha Divakar		
10	12 April	Jewel Mary		
11	13 April	Meena (actress)		
13	20 April	Shalu Kurian		
14	27 April	Sethu Lakshmi, Rajesh Hebbar		
15	11 May	Jayaraj Warrier		
16	15 May	Baby Meenakshi, Anika Surendran		
17	16 May	Sreya Jayadeep, Gauri. P. Krishnan		
18	17 May	Gaurav Melon, Baby Nayantara		
19	18 May	Master Rudraksh, Master Ajaas		
20	22 May	Vaikom Vijayalakshmi, Sithara (singer)		
21	23 May	Ranjini Jose, Sachin Warrier		
22	24 May	Kavya, Sooraj Santhosh		
23	25 May	Sayanora Philip, Gayathri		
24	26 June	Nandu, Thesni Khan		
25	27 June	K. P. A. C. Lalitha, Sshivada		
26	28 June	Sajan Surya, Devi Chandana		
27	29 June	Surabhi Lakshmi		
28	6 July	Sheela, Parvathy Nambiar	₹6,40,000/-	Appeared in the closing episode (100th episode) of Season 4 of the show

==== Kodeeshwaran Junior ====
This is a special round that contained school students as the contestants. The episodes were telecast from 1 May 2017 to 10 May 2017, from 5 June 2017 to 9 June 2017 and again from 19 June 2017 to 23 June 2017.

No.	Date	Students	Amount won
1	1, 2 May	Keerthana & Darshana	₹1,60,000/-
2	3, 4 May	Sreya & Prathyusha	₹1,60,000/-
3	8 May	Allen & Kevin	₹10,000/-
4	8, 9 May	Malavika & Arya	₹80,000/-
5	10 May	Arundhati & Sarad	₹40,000/-
6	5 June	Abhiram & Meera	₹40,000/-
7	6,7 June	Arya & Sreya	₹6,40,000/-
8	7, 8 June	Juhina & Allen	₹1,60,000/-
9	9, 19 June	Aswin & Anuvinda	₹40,000/-
10	19, 20 June	Jeevan & Neha	₹3,20,000/-
11	21, 22, 23 June	Charudath & Shamna	₹12,50,000/-

== Rules ==
The standard Millionaire format is used, with the Fastest Finger contest before the main game.

The money won after each question is roughly doubled from the previous amount won, exponentially increasing the amount won after each correct answer until the contestant reaches the final question, after which they win the maximum prize (1 crore).

The clock format was used, question 1 - 5, the contestants has 30 second (season 1 - 2), 45 second (season 3 - 5) for thinking and give the correct answer, for question 5 - 10 contestants has 45 second (season 1 - 2), 60 second (season 3 - 4) in last 5 question, 11 - 15: no time limits.

=== Prize table ===
All seasons
- ₹1,000/-
- ₹2,000/-
- ₹3,000/-
- ₹5,000/-
- ₹10,000
- ₹20,000/-
- ₹40,000/-
- ₹80,000/-
- ₹1,60,000/-
- ₹3,20,000/-
- ₹6,40,000/-
- ₹12,50,000
- ₹25,00,000
- ₹50,00,000/-
- ₹1,00,00,000/-

=== Lifelines ===
A contestant can use a lifeline when he/she is undecided about which answer is correct. A lifeline can only be used once.

- Audience Poll: If the contestant uses this lifeline, it will result in the host repeating the question to the audience. The studio audience get 10 seconds to answer the question. Audience members use touch pads to designate what they believe the correct answer to be. After the audience have chosen their choices, the results are displayed to the contestant in percentages in bar-graph format and also shown on the monitors screens of the host and contestant, as well as the TV viewers.
- Phone a Friend: If the contestant uses this lifeline, the contestant is allowed to call one of the three pre-arranged friends, who all have to provide their phone numbers in advance. The host usually starts off by talking to the contestant's friend and introduces him/her to the viewers. After the introduction, the host hands the phone call over to the contestant who then immediately has 30 seconds to ask and hope for a reply from their friend.
- Fifty-Fifty (50/50) (except season 3): If the contestant uses this lifeline, the host will ask the computer to randomly remove and eliminate two of the "wrong" answers. This will leave one right answer and one wrong answer, resulting in a situation of eliminating 50% of the choices as well as having a 50% chance of getting the answer right if the contestant is in a situation of making a guess.
- Double Dip (for season 3): This lifeline allows the contestant to make two guesses at a question. Getting both answers incorrect results in the contestant's winnings dropping back down to the last milestone achieved. This lifeline differs from others in that once the player has chosen to use this lifeline, he/she must answer the question, and cannot walk away or use any further lifelines on that question.
- Code Red (from season 3) which gives the opportunity for the contestant's family members to warn the contestant if they feel the answer is wrong.

=== Records ===
Sanooja Rajan from Nedumangad, Thiruvananthapuram made history by winning the top prize (₹1,00,00,000/-) in Season 2. This made Ningalkkum Aakaam Kodeeswaran as the second version after KBC to have a top score winner in India. Shyla C. K was the top scorer of Ningalkum Aakaam Kodeeshwaran in Season 1, winning ₹50 lakh. This season also witnessed the game played by pairs other than Individuals while previously pairs game were allowed only for celebrities.

==== Top scorers ====
No.	Date	Name	Place	Amount won
1	30 April 2013 – 1 May 2013 (season 2)	Sanooja Rajan	Nedumangad	₹1,00,00,000/-
2	15–17 May 2012 (season 1)	Shyla C.K	Painavu	₹50,00,000/-
3	6 April 2015 (season 3)	Sooraj	Pappanamcode	₹50,00,000/-
4	7–8 May 2012 (season 1)	Shobha	Kadakkavoor	₹25,00,000/-
5	22–23 August 2012 (season 1)	Aneesh	Mavelikkara	₹25,00,000/-
6	7 March 2013 (season 2)	Sangeetha	Pathanamthitta	₹25,00,000/-
7	4 April 2013 (season 2)	Kishore K.P	Thrissur	₹25,00,000/-
8	11 March 2015 (season 3)	Dhanya	Beypore	₹25,00,000/-

== See also ==
- Kaun Banega Crorepati
- Neengalum Vellalam Oru Kodi
- Kannadada Kotyadhipati
- Meelo Evaru Koteeswarudu
- Ko Banchha Crorepati
- Ke Bani Crorepati
- Kus Bani Koshur Karorpaet
- Kon Honar Crorepati
