= India Poochega Sabse Shaana Kaun? =

- Genre: Reality
- Created by: Big Synergy
- Presented by: Shah Rukh Khan
- Country of origin: India
- Original language: Hindi
- No. of seasons: 1
- No. of episodes: 20

Production
- Producer: Siddhartha Basu
- Production location: Mumbai
- Running time: 45 minutes approx.

Original release
- Network: &TV
- Release: 2 March – 27 March 2015

India Poochega: Sabse Shaana Kaun? is an Indian reality game show hosted by actor Shah Rukh Khan. Adapted from the "Who's Asking?" international format, it opened on 2 March 2015 on Zee Network's newly launched entertainment channel &TV. The format of the show is simple. Two pairs compete against each other for a winning amount of ₹10 million (US$100,000). They will first be asked questions by ordinary people. Once they clear that round, a galaxy of celebrities will ask the winning pair a set of questions. The usual lifelines are present and so on.

== Format ==
The show is a first of its kind where the common man will don the hat of the 'asker', as well as that of the contestant. While the 'askers' shall pose the questions, the contestants will be seen demonstrating their street-smartness to win big bucks. In the first round, the contestants have to look at the options on the screen and pick a questioner for themselves. In the second round, the opposite team has to pick one for their competitors. The finalists will face a pyramid of 15 celebrity questioners.

== Celebrity appearances ==
Guest(s)	Episode
Yuvraj Singh, Harbhajan Singh, Manish Pandey and Robin Uthappa	9 March 2015
Kiku Sharda, Upasana Singh, Johnny Lever and Jamie Lever	16 March 2015
Sushant Singh Rajput	19 March 2015
Rithvik Dhanjani and Karan Wahi	25, 26 March 2015
Karan Johar, Farah Khan, Anushka Sharma and Alia Bhatt	26, 27 March 2015

== Reception ==
Subramanian Harikumar of Bollywood Life gave the show 3.5 out of 5 stars and said, "India Poochega: Sabse Shaana Kaun has everything that you expect from a Shah Rukh Khan show and the actor has put his best foot forward, turning on the charm to full swing, adding glitz and glamour to a rather simple yet entertaining show." Ankita Chaurasia of The Times of India also gave a positive review, citing that "The show is interactive and manages to engage the viewer; Shah Rukh Khan's jokes and impeccable timing spice things up and keep the audience engaged. It has managed to generate enough buzz to garner decent numbers in the first week. If you haven't watched the show as yet, here's an invitation to do so."
