= Sell Me the Answer (Indian game show) =

- Genre: Game show
- Presented by: Mukesh (1); Mukesh (2); Suraj Venjaramoodu (2); Mukesh (3)
- Country of origin: India
- Original language: Malayalam
- No. of episodes: 191

Production
- Production location: Kerala
- Running time: 60 minutes (inc. adverts)
- Production company: Big Synergy

Original release
- Network: Asianet
- Release: 22 June 2015 – 16 February 2019

Related
- Sell Me the Answer

Sell Me The Answer is an Indian Malayalam game show that premiered on Asianet worldwide which also features celebrities and singers. It was adapted from the British game show of the same title which was broadcast on Sky1 in the United Kingdom. Actor Mukesh is the host of the show.

== Format ==
The contestants need to answer ten questions to win 1,000,000 Indian rupees. The contestants can buy the answer if any questions appeared non similar or wrong for them from the traders and those people sell their answer for a fixed amount from the contestant fixed within 10 seconds.

== Season 1 ==
The first season comprised 84 episodes and ended on 12 November 2015. It was telecasted on Monday to Thursdays 8:00 pm to 9:00 pm. The show replaced popular game show Ningalkkum Aakaam Kodeeshwaran hosted by Suresh Gopi. The season featured Film and television celebrities like:

- Dharmajan Bolgatty
- Shalu Kurian
- Kottayam Rasheed
- Sri Lakshmi
- Vivek Gopan
- Premi Vishwanath
- Mamukkoya
- Kalpana
- Rimy Tomy
- Indrans
- Gayathri Suresh
- Sethu Lakshmi
- Sithara
- Thesni Khan
- Dinesh Prabhakar
- Molly Kannamaly
- Manoj K. Jayan
- Asha Sarath
- Parvathy
- Tini Tom
- Ashokan
- Joju George
- Nadirshah
- M. G. Sreekumar

== Season 2 ==
The second season of the series is launched on 4 April 2016 and ended on 1 September 2016 and was hosted by both Suraj Venjaramoodu and Mukesh separately. Celebrity Guests:

- Swetha Mohan
- Pashanam Shaji
- Anusree
- Ansiba Hassan
- Suresh Thampanoor
- Noby
- Jayakumar Payyans
- Pashanam Shaji
- Arya Rohit
- Molly Kannamaly
- Master Gaurav Menon
- Baby Shreya
- Baby Meenakshi
- Sayanora Philip
- Job Kurien
- Saiju Kurup
- K. P. A. C. Lalitha
- Jayaraj Warrier
- Maniyanpilla Raju
- Kochu Preman
- Kalabhavan Shajohn
- Padmaraj Ratheesh
- Priyanka Nair
- Meera Nandan
- Ramesh Pisharody

== Season 3 ==
The third season of the series premiered on 13 October 2018 and was hosted by Mukesh for the third time in a row. The show airs on Weekends at 9:00 P.M.

Celebrity guests:

- Sabumon Abdusamad
- Miya George
- Samyuktha Menon
- Alina Padikkal
- Aristo Suresh
- Pashanam Shaji
- Fr. Davis Chirammel
- Kottayam Naseer
- Jayaram
- Rebecca Santhosh, Della George
- Dhanya Mary Varghese, Reneesha
- Rini Raj, Pradeep
- Salim Kumar
- Sayanora Philip
- Sajan Surya, Mrudula
- Siddharth, Haritha G Nair
- Durga, Malavika
- Harishankar, Annie Amie
