= Ishita Ganguly =

Indian television actress

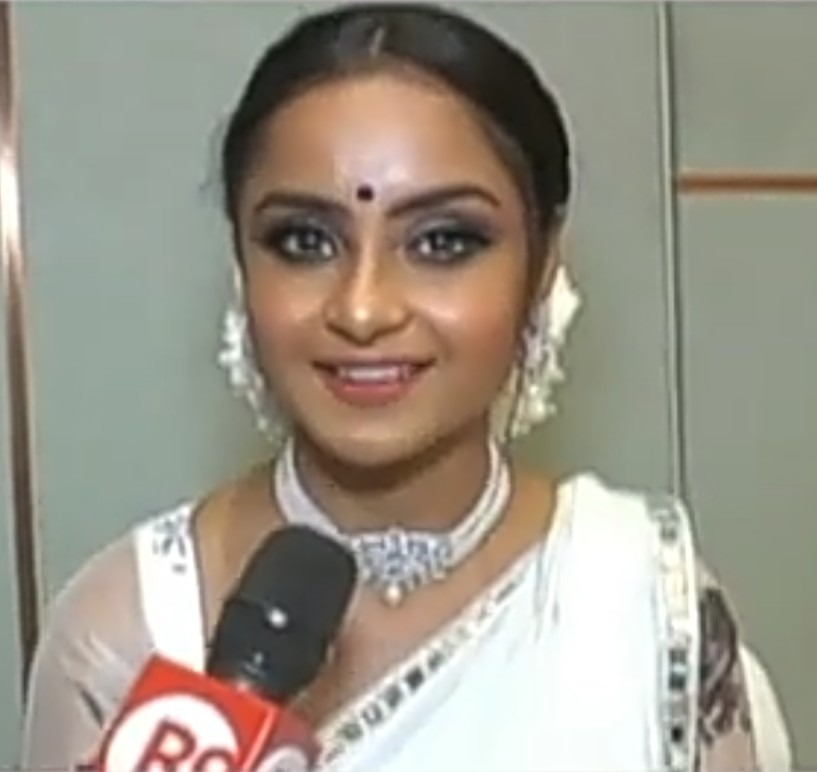
- Born: Kolkata, West Bengal, India
- Occupation: Actress
- Years active: 2011–present
- Known for: Mrs Sinha Roy; Shastri Sisters; Annapurna; Badi Haveli Ki Chhoti Thakurain
- Relatives: Sumant Ganguly (brother)

Ishita Ganguly (born 24 July 1992) is an Indian television actress predominantly working in Hindi television series. She has also appeared in a Bengali television series.

== Career ==
Ganguly's first television series was Mrs Sinha Roy, a Bengali daily soap which premiered on Sananda TV. She then appeared in Colors TV's 2014 drama series Shastri Sisters, in which she portrayed Anushka Shastri opposite Vijayendra Kumeria.

From 2023 to 2024, she portrayed Gopala in Dangal's Nath. Last she played Chamkeli in Badi Haveli Ki Chhoti Thakurain, produced by Natkhat Productions.

== Television ==
Year	Serial	Role
2011–2012	Mrs Sinha Roy	Saraswati Mondal Singha Roy
2012	Bhasha	Riya
2013	Annapurna (ETV Bangla serial)	Annapurna
2014–2015	Shastri Sisters	Anushka Shastri / Anushka Rajat Sareen
2015	Tu Mera Hero	Juhi
2015	Darr Sabko Lagta Hai	Ana
2016	Ishq Ka Rang Safed	Kamini Mehra
2016	Yeh Hai Aashiqui	Navya
2016–2017	Y.A.R.O Ka Tashan	Minty
2017	Peshwa Bajirao	Kashibai
2018	Prithvi Vallabh - Itihaas Bhi, Rahasya Bhi	Rajkumari Amrusha
2018	Laal Ishq	Nitya
2018	Kaun Hai?	Chandralekha / Raisa Rastogi
2018–2019	Vikram Betaal Ki Rahasya Gatha	Maharani Padmini
2019	Laal Ishq	Dr. Arshi
2019–2020	Shrimad Bhagwat Mahapuran	Devi Parvati
2019–2020	Jag Janani Maa Vaishno Devi - Kahani Mata Rani Ki	Devi Parvati
2020	RadhaKrishn	Draupadi
2020–2021	Vighnaharta Ganesha	Manasa
2022	Ghar Ek Mandir Kripa Agrasen Maharaj Ka	Sandhya Gupta
2022	Parshuram	Devi Parvati
2022	Shubh Shagun	Naina
2022	Gud Se Meetha Ishq	Chandni
2022–2023	Parshuram – Ek Naya Adhyay	Devi Parvati
2023	Yeh Hai Chahatein	Manasi Khanna
2023	Maitree	Swarnmani
2023–2024	Nath	Gopala
2024	Chhathi Maiyya Ki Bitiya	Vaishnavi's mother
2025	Badi Haveli Ki Chhoti Thakurain	Chamkeeli

== Web series ==
Year	Show	Role
2022	Nirmal Pathak Ki Ghar Wapsi	Geetanjali
TBA	Mahima Mata Vaishno Devi	Vaishnodevi

== Filmography ==
Year	Film	Role
2017	Meri Pyaari Bindu	Das Cabin Girl – Prospective Bride
2019	Rescue	Meera

== Short films ==
Year	Show	Role
2019	Karma	Shiva
