= Jabab Kinte Chai =

- Promo
- Genre: Quiz show
- Developed by: Siddharth Basu
- Presented by: Mir Afsar Ali
- Country of origin: India
- Original language: Bengali

Original release
- Network: Sananda TV
- Release: 28 May 2012

Jabab Kinte Chai (alternative spelling– Jobab KInte Chai) is a Bengali television quiz show. This show is aired on Sananda TV and hosted by Mir Afsar Ali. The planner and the mastermind of this show is quiz master Siddharth Basu.

== Format ==
Inspired by the British game show Sell Me the Answer it is basically a quiz show with a mix of bargaining. If a contestant does not know answer of a question, (s)he can buy the answer of the question from traders who are there to play for the contestant as well as against the contestant. The role of a trader is to help a contestant to win the maximum cash, but on the other hand, the trader also targets his own money. So, he could also completely mislead a player by giving the wrong answer. In an interview, Mir, the anchor of the quiz show told– "On moral grounds, it's a little sticky because the one who you think is helping you could actually completely trick you and make you give the wrong answer."

The maximum prize amount a participant can win is ₹2.5 million (US$26,000).
