= Mrs Sinha Roy =

- Genre: Family, Drama
- Starring: See left
- Country of origin: India
- Original language: Bengali
- No. of seasons: 1

Production
- Producer: Shree Venkatesh Films
- Production location: Kolkata
- Running time: Approx. 43 minutes

Original release
- Network: Sananda TV

Mrs. Singha Roy is an Indian Bengali language family drama television show produced by Shree Venkatesh Films and directed by Partha Sen. The show stars Ishita Ganguly and Laboni Sarkar in lead roles. The show aired at 8:30pm from Monday to Friday on Sananda TV.

== Plot ==
The duplicitous Damayanti Singha Roy saves distressed women through her non-governmental organization. A poor woman, Saraswati Mondal marries into the family and the series follows her as she interacts with hostile members of her new family.

== Cast ==
- Ishita Ganguly as Saraswati Mondal Singha Roy
- Laboni Sarkar as Damayanti Singha Roy
- Rajat Ganguly
- Debdut Ghosh
- Joyjit Banerjee
- Piyali Munshi
- Barun Chakraborty as Biswanath Mondal
- Moushumi Saha
