= Aap Ki Kachehri =

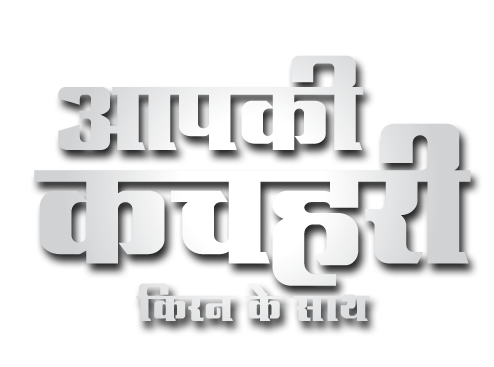
- "Aap Ki Kachehri" Intertitle with host Kiran Bedi
- Also known as: Aap Ki Kachehri... Kiran Ke Saath
- Starring: Kiran Bedi
- Country of origin: India
- Original language: Hindi
- No. of seasons: 3
- No. of episodes: 75

Production
- Producer: Big Synergy
- Running time: 24 minutes

Original release
- Network: STAR Plus
- Release: 1 December 2008 – 14 August 2011

Aap Ki Kachehri... Kiran Ke Saath is an Indian television reality show about real-life situations. The series premiered on the television channel, STAR Plus and is a platform for settling disputes between consenting individuals. The series is based on real-life disputes. The Indian social activist and retired Indian police officer, Kiran Bedi plays the role of the body officially appointed to settle a dispute.

Season 1 started airing from 1 December 2008 and ended on 14 March 2009 airing Monday through Friday. Season 2 started airing 5 August 2009 and ran through 2 October 2009. Season 3 ran from 30 April 2011 to 14 August 2011.
