= Mastermind India =

Indian television quiz show

Mastermind India is an Indian television quiz show based on the British quiz show Mastermind. It originally aired on BBC World's "Made in India" series between 1998 and 2002. Each round saw four contestants taking the black chair one by one, and facing rapid fire questions on subjects of their own choosing in the first half, and on general knowledge in the second half. One of the hallmarks of the Indian show was the staging of the contest at heritage sites across the country. For example, in 1999 the semi-finals were held at the Ferozshah Kotla in Delhi, and the finals were held at the City Palace, Jaipur. Mastermind India was hosted by Siddhartha Basu and had five seasons, the last one being in 2002.

The winners in each year were:

- 1998 - Dayita Datta, schoolteacher from Welham Girls' School, Dehra Dun
- 1999 - Ajai Banerji - also a schoolteacher from The Doon School, Dehra Dun
- 2000 - K.E. Priyamvada, copy editor from Delhi
- 2001 - Archana Garodia, businesswoman from Noida
- 2002 - Ramanand Janardhanan, software engineer from Pune.

A Champion of Champions round was held in mid-2002 to launch the fifth series, pitting the first four title holders together, which was won by Archana Garodia.

== Mastermind India: The Book ==
Mastermind India with Siddhartha Basu is a quiz book featuring all the questions and answers of each series. There are five volumes of Mastermind India. The first edition was published by Teksons, Delhi and the later were published by Penguin India. Each volume is for one year. A hardback volume is published for series one to three.
