= DD Kashir =

Regional subsidiary television station of Doordarshan in Jammu and Kashmir

- Country: India
- Broadcast area: Jammu and Kashmir and Ladakh (terrestrial); Nationwide (satellite and cable)
- Network: Doordarshan
- Headquarters: Srinagar and Jammu, Jammu and Kashmir; Leh, Ladakh

Programming
- Language: List: Kashmiri; Urdu; Balti; Dogri; English; Gojri; Hindi; Ladakhi; Pahari; Pashto; Punjabi; Shina
- Picture format: 576i (16:9) SDTV

Ownership
- Owner: Prasar Bharati

History
- Launched: 1999 (as Doordarshan Kendra Srinagar, Jammu and Leh)

DD Kashir is a state-owned regional television channel serving the Indian union territories of Jammu and Kashmir and Ladakh in the disputed Kashmir region, owned by the state television broadcaster Doordarshan, largely focusing on local traditions and heritage of the region. Launched in 2000 by then Indian prime minister Atal Bihari Vajpayee, DD Kashir broadcasts from Doordarshan's stations in Srinagar, Jammu, and Leh.

DD Kashir has its origins from Doordarshan Kendra Srinagar and Doordarshan Kendra Jammu, launched in 1973 and 1993 respectively. Doordarshan launched the channel with an aim to counter Pakistani propaganda in the Kashmir Valley, after the Indian government enhanced their transmitters near the India–Pakistan border. DD Kashir includes programming focusing on Kashmiri culture and traditions, as well as the history of the Kashmir Valley. It broadcasts in twelve languages, including Kashmiri, Urdu, Dogri, Ladakhi, and Hindi.

== History ==
Doordarshan established its Srinagar station on 26 January 1973 on channel 4, making it among its oldest television stations. The station broadcast in several Kashmiri languages, and its programming even gained popularity in neighboring Pakistan. Doordarshan later launched its Jammu television station in 1993, located in the Panjtirthi neigborhood. Its studio was established in 2011. Doordarshan expanded to Ladakh by establishing a station in Leh in 2000, although it was mainly run by non-local staff at the time. On 13 February 1990, Lassa Kaul, then director of Doordarshan Kendra Srinagar, was assassinated by militants. This caused Srinagar operations to be moved to Jammu and New Delhi.

In 1999, the Government of India upgraded the radio transmitters of All India Radio in Srinagar and set up new television transmitters in Jammu and Kathua, and also approved a special package for Jammu and Kashmir for All India Radio and Doordarshan to enhance their reach to the state. This was done in order to counter alleged Pakistani propaganda across the border. DD Kashir was launched as a satellite and cable television channel on 26 June 2000, uplinking from the Srinagar station of Doordarshan, also commencing full-day broadcasts on 15 August 2003, coinciding Indian Independence Day that year.

DD Kashir was operated from Delhi but in the year 2006, the Centre decided to shift the operations of Doordarshan's 'Kashir' channel back to Srinagar from Delhi after more than 17 years since the outbreak of violence in Kashmir in late 1980s, thus fulfilling a long-standing demand of the people of the Valley.

The channel used to telecast a 14 and half-hour programme daily. Out of these, commissioned programmes account for six hours, another four and half hours are taken by in-house and news/current affairs programmes while the archival programmes take four hours daily. In July 2017, DD Kashir began airing the Indian adaptation of Sesame Street, Galli Galli Sim Sim, dubbed in Kashmiri and Urdu. On 29 April 2019, as part of revamping the channel, DD Kashir premiered the Kashmiri-language adaptation of Who Wants to Be a Millionaire? titled Kus Bani Koshur Karorpaet, airing until 6 July.

== Programming and news ==
One notable programming on the channel is Budhshah, which told the life of the historical Sultan Zain-ul-Abidin. DD Kashir also broadcasts news bulletins in Kashmiri and Urdu. The channel began airing Ladakhi-language programming and news on 10 September 2018, as well as news programming in Dogri for audiences in Jammu in 2019. The news is edited and gathered by the regional news unit of Doordarshan, and broadcast on main service.

The channel broadcasts a wide variety of programming in Kashmiri, Urdu, Balti, Gojri, Ladakhi, Shina, and Punjabi, as well as in Pahari languages such as Dogri. It also broadcasts Bollywood movies. Since the 2010s, DD Kashir has been criticised by audiences for the lack of local programming and degrading quality, and also airing older programming as most of its digital library was lost due to the 2014 floods in Kashmir.

=== List of programming ===
- Awaam Ki Awaaz
- Galli Galli Sim Sim
- Good Morning J&K
- Hello Kisan
- Khel Aur Khiladi
- Krishi Darshan
- Kus Bani Koshur Karorpaet
- Pakistan Reporter
- Sarhad Ke Do Rukh

== See also ==
- Ministry of Information and Broadcasting
- DD Free Dish
- List of South Asian television channels by country
