= Crorepati =

Crorepati is a Hindi word for a person who has assets worth one crore i.e. 10 million rupees. Crorepati is merger of two words crore and pati; where means lord. It may refer to:

- Karodpati, a 1961 Indian film
- Karodpathi, a 2014 Indian film
- Kaun Banega Crorepati, an Indian game show based on Who Wants to Be a Millionaire?
- Kya Aap Banaingay Crorepati?, a Pakistani version of the game show

== See also ==
- Koteshwar (disambiguation)
- Who Wants to Be a Millionaire (disambiguation)
