= Quizzer of the Year =

Indian reality quiz show

Quizzer of the Year (QOTY) is a pan-India quiz challenge on Sony LIV. Participants can test their abilities and knowledge against others across the country.

QOTY school contest is designed for students between classes IX and XII. Participants need to answer seven multiple choice questions everyday, collect points and unlock levels. They stand a chance to win daily, weekly and monthly prizes; an opportunity to feature on Sony LIV and an educational scholarship of 1 crore.

The challenge is curated and hosted by Siddhartha Basu.

== Gameplay ==
Students across India from classes IX - XII (9th to 12th) are eligible to register and participate in Quizzer of the Year on the Sony LIV App or website. The format of the show is divided into multiple levels.

- Round 1: QOTY Daily

After registration, participants can attempt seven multiple-choice questions everyday. Each right answer awards them 10 points. Students must collect at least 500 points to advance to the next round. Answering quickly will provide them with an advantage.

- Round 2: QOTY Select

Students with a minimum of 500 points will log on to the Sony LIV app for an appointment quiz of 20 questions. They will play this round against other qualifiers. Top scoring students will move to Round 3.

- Round 3: QOTY City I

This will be an online live session where participants will engage in an appointment quiz against all qualifiers from their respective city zones. Students need to answer 20 questions as fast as they can. Only the top quizzers will advance further.

At this stage, students will be teamed up with the next-best scorer from their school to form their school’s official QOTY team.

- Round 4 - QOTY City II

All teams will participate in an online face-off in a webisode moderated by a quiz master. The top teams will make it to the finals, hosted by Siddhartha Basu.

- Round 5 - QOTY Finals

The final stage will consist of 7 rounds - 4 preliminaries, 2 semi-finals, and 1 ultimate finale. The winning team will take home the ‘Quizzer Of The Year’ title and an educational scholarship of 1 crore.
