= Koteshwar =

Koteshwar may refer to:

- Koteshwar or Kotishwar means millionaire in Sanskrit and is another name for the Hindu deity Shiva
- Koteshwar, Kutch, a Shiva temple in Gujarat, India
- Koteshwar, Karnataka, a village in Karnataka, India
- Koteshwor, Kathmandu, Nepal
- Koteshwar, Uttarakhand, a village in Uttarakhand, India
- Koteshwar Dam, part of the Tehri Dam complex in India
- Koteshwar Mahadev, a Shiva temple in Uttarakhand, India

== See also ==
- Koteshwar Brahmin, an Indian caste
- Crorepati (disambiguation)
