= Archana Garodia Gupta =

Indian author and entrepreneur

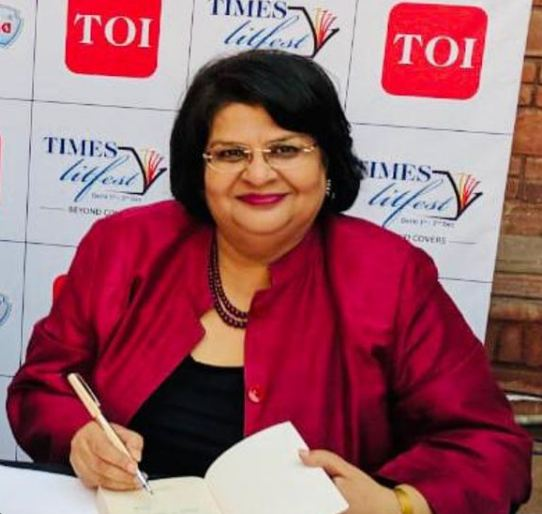
- Born: Kolkata, India
- Education: Delhi University (BA Hons); Indian Institute of Management, Ahmedabad (MBA)

Archana Garodia Gupta is an Indian author, entrepreneur, business leader, and quizzer. She was the president of the FICCI Ladies Association in 2015.

== Early life and education ==
Archana was born in Kolkata and grew up in Delhi.

She did her schooling in Modern School, Vasant Vihar and graduated from the Lady Shri Ram College for Women, Delhi University, with a BA (Hons) in Economics in 1986. She did her MBA from the Indian Institute of Management, Ahmedabad, in the top 15 of her class with a merit scholarship.

== Business career ==
Archana Gupta owns and runs Touchstone, a successful gem and jewelry business, which is a pioneer of Indian costume jewelry. Touchstone has a pan Indian retail presence and also exports, primarily to the US and Europe.

== Public sphere ==
Archana was the President of FLO, the women’s wing of FICCI, the Federation of Indian Chambers of Commerce and Industry, in 2015- 2016.

She has been working in the sphere of women’s development for the last two decades. Among other women empowerment initiatives promoted were Swayam, a handholding, mentoring, and consultancy cell nationwide for women, and a number of skilling and employment initiatives under the umbrella WE (Women Empowerment).

Archana Garodia Gupta has been the National Chair of the FICCI MSME Committee. She is a member of the Brics Financial Committee from India, leading the SME Taskforce.

She has been a spokesperson on behalf of FICCI in many national and international forums and for print and television. She has been a key board member of the Noida Women Entrepreneurs Association for the last 20 years. She helped promote a successful women’s industrial park along with the UP Government, Mahila Udyami Park, in Greater Noida in 1999. She is on the governing body of the Indian Institute of Management Sirmaur.

She is on the Board of Trustees and Governing Body of I.P. College for Women, Delhi University. Other posts held previously include being a member of the SAARC Committee, FICCI. She is widely traveled, both in her business capacity and as a speaker in international conferences.

== Quizzing ==
She has been an expert for many episodes on the popular Indian television show Kaun Banega Crorepati hosted by Amitabh Bachchan in 2019 and 2020. She conducts quizzes on a national and international level.

== Literary career ==
Archana Garodia Gupta is the coauthor, along with Shruti Garodia, of the bestselling two-volume A History of India for Children published by Hachette, which was nominated for the Crossword book award, and included in The Times of India list of "10 books every Indian child must read". It comprehensively covers the history of India from prehistory to modern times.

She is also the author of The Women Who Ruled India, which details the stories of 20 women who ruled in India. She writes on retail, women’s issues, and history for newspapers and magazines. She co-writes the column "Revisiting History" in The Hindu in School. She has written regular columns for Indian Express Parenting. She has written a column on Women in Indian History for Swarajya magazine. She has spoken at many literary festivals across the country.

== Awards and recognition ==
- Winner of BBC Mastermind India TV Quiz, 2001
- Bharat Nirman Award for Women Entrepreneurship
- FLO IWAAF 2018 award for Outstanding Contribution for Mobilizing Women Entrepreneurs
- Nominated for Crossword Popular Choice Best Children’s Book 2019
- Selected in The Times of India "list of 10 books every Indian child must read"
