= Kodeeswari =

Indian-Tamil quiz show

- Genre: Quiz show
- Presented by: Radhika Sarathkumar
- Country of origin: India
- Original language: Tamil
- No. of seasons: 1
- No. of episodes: 40

Original release
- Network: Colors Tamil
- Release: 23 December 2019 – 14 February 2020

Related
- Neengalum Vellalam Oru Kodi; Who Wants to Be a Millionaire?

Kodeeswari is a Tamil quiz show which aired on Colors Tamil from Monday to Friday at 8 pm. It is the Indian Tamil women's edition of Who Wants to Be a Millionaire? It began on 23 December 2019. It was hosted by Radhika Sarathkumar

== History ==
In 2019, the show was restarted from Neengalum Vellalam Oru Kodi to Kodeeswari. This season was the first in India where a woman became the host, and was the first version in the world where only women were allowed to sign up as contestants.

== Rules ==
Similar to international version of Millionaire, after all contestant selected to the show and qualify, they will be play Fastest Finger First to get into the Hot Seat.

== Time Limit ==
Similar to the some another of the India version, in this season, every contestant had a clock. For the answers of 1st to 5th questions. The contestants had 45 seconds to answer 6th to 10th questions. The contestant was given 60 seconds if the contestant successfully answered the 10th question, they could answer 11-15 questions. In the meantime, the clock would be disappeared, and the player could think long time as they wanted.

== Lifelines ==
- Audience Poll (பார்வையாளர் கருத்துக்கணிப்பு):- If any contestant would use this lifeline, the host would repeat the question to the audience. The studio audience would get 10 seconds to answer the question. Audience members would use touchpads to give the answer what they believe. After the audience would have chosen their choices, their choices would be displayed to the contestant in percentages in bar-graph format and also shown on the monitors screens of the host and contestant, as well as the TV viewers.
- 50:50:- If the contestant would use this lifeline, the host would ask the computer to remove two of the wrong answers. This would remain one right answer and one wrong answer. This would help a contestant giving 50% chance of answering the correct answer.
- Ask The Expert (நிபுணரிடம் கேளுங்கள்):- If the contestant would use this lifeline, the contestant would be allowed to call the selected expert. The host would usually be started off by talking to the expert and introduces him/her to the viewers at the first of the show.
- Flip A Question (ஒரு கேள்வியை புரட்டவும்):- When a contestant would use this lifeline, the computer would replace the current question with another one of the same monetary value. However, any lifelines used on the original question are not reinstated, and the contestant could not return to the original question, as the computer will reveal the correct answer to the old question before replacing it.

== Money Tree ==
Question	Correct Answer Value	Walk Away Value	Miss Answer Value	Amount Lost if Wrong Answer
15	₹1,00,00,000/-	₹50,00,000/-	₹3,20,000/-	₹46,80,000/-
14	₹50,00,000/-	₹25,00,000/-	₹3,20,000/-	₹21,80,000/-
13	₹25,00,000/-	₹12,50,000/-	₹3,20,000/-	₹9,30,000/-
12	₹12,50,000/-	₹6,40,000/-	₹3,20,000/-	₹3,20,000/-
11	₹6,40,000/-	₹3,20,000/-	₹3,20,000/-	₹0/-
10	₹3,20,000/-	₹1,60,000/-	₹10,000/-	₹1,50,000/-
9	₹1,60,000/-	₹80,000/-	₹10,000/-	₹70,000/-
8	₹80,000/-	₹40,000/-	₹10,000/-	₹30,000/-
7	₹40,000/-	₹20,000/-	₹10,000/-	₹10,000/-
6	₹20,000/-	₹10,000/-	₹10,000/-	₹0/-
5	₹10,000/-	₹5,000/-	₹0/-	₹5,000/-
4	₹5,000/-	₹ 3,000/-	₹0/-	₹3,000/-
3	₹3,000/-	₹2,000/-	₹0/-	₹2,000/-
2	₹2,000/-	₹1,000/-	₹0/-	₹1,000/-
1	₹1,000/-	₹0/-	₹0/-	₹0/-

== Winners ==
=== ₹1,00,00,000/- Winners ===
- Kousalya Kharthika (21 January 2020)

=== ₹25,00,000/- Winners ===
- Mahalakshmi (3 January 2020)

=== ₹12,50,000/- Winners ===
- Vallikannu (23 December 2019)
- Kubbulakshmi Kumutha (30 December 2019)
- Eshwari (10 January 2020)
- Varalaxmi Sarathkumar and Sarathkumar Ramanathan (13 January 2020)

=== ₹6,40,000/- Winners ===
- Chandini (24 December 2019)
- Gowthami (25 December 2019)
- Devi Shree (1 January 2020)
- Pradeepa (9 January 2020)
- Radha (14 January 2020)
- Ramya Krishnan (15 January 2020)

=== ₹3,20,000/- Winners ===
- Swetha (27 December 2019)
- Vasanthi G (31 December 2019)
- Balapushpa (7 January 2020)
- Abinaya (8 January 2020)

=== ₹1,60,000/- Winners ===
- Meena (27 December 2019)
- Sree Geetha (2 January 2019)

=== ₹40,000/- Winners ===
- Darshu (14 December 2019)
- Angeline (26 December 2019)

=== ₹10,000/- Winners ===
- Archana Devi (6 January 2020)
- Susmitha (7 January 2020)

=== ₹0/- Winners ===
- Uma Maheswari (31 December 2019)
