= Mahuaa Bangla =

Indian Bengali-language television channel

Mahua Bangla
- Country: India
- Headquarters: Kolkata, West Bengal, India

Ownership
- Owner: Mahuaa Media Private Limited

History
- Launched: 2000; 26 years ago
- Closed: 2012; 14 years ago
- Former names: TVN Bangla (2000–2010)

Links
- Website: mahuaabangla.com

Mahuaa Bangla was an Indian Bengali-language general entertainment television channel launched by Mahuaa Media Private Limited, launched in 2010. It later ceased transmissions in 2012.

== History ==
It was owned by Mahuaa Media Pvt. Ltd, the owners of the Bhojpuri Channel WB Trend, had announced fir launching a Bengali Channel. On 9 July 2010, the officials of MMPL organised a press conference in Kolkata, and at the same time they unveiled the logo of the channel and its programming line-up. Mahuaa Bangla ceased operations in December 2012.

== Former shows ==
- Alphona
- Duorani
- Harano Sur
- Janmantar
- Kajori
- Vish Kanya

=== Reality shows ===
- Ke Hobe Banglar Kotipoti (Season 1)
- Sur – Sangram Bangla
- Twinkle Twinkle Little Stars

== See also ==
- WBTrend – Latest News & Stories
