= Evaru Meelo Koteeswarulu =

Indian quiz show

- Official logo of the game show
- Also known as: Meelo Evaru Koteeswarudu (2014–2017)
- Based on: Who Wants to Be a Millionaire?
- Directed by: Arun Sheshkumar
- Presented by: Nagarjuna (Season 1–3); Chiranjeevi (Season 4); N. T. Rama Rao Jr. (Season 5)
- Composers: Keith Strachan; Matthew Strachan; Ramon Covalo; Nick Magnus; Sawan Dutta
- Country of origin: India
- Original language: Telugu
- No. of seasons: 5
- No. of episodes: 292

Production
- Production locations: Hyderabad, India
- Running time: 90 minutes
- Production companies: BIG Synergy (seasons 1–4); Studio Next (season 5)

Original release
- Network: Maa TV (Season 1–3); Star Maa (Season 4); Gemini TV (Season 5)
- Release: 9 June 2014 – 5 December 2021

Evaru Meelo Koteeswarulu (transl. Who among you are millionaires?), previously known as Meelo Evaru Koteeswarudu, is an Indian Telugu-language television quiz show. It is the official Telugu version of based on the British game show Who Wants to Be a Millionaire?. It was produced by BIG Synergy for its first four seasons and was aired on Star Maa. The first three seasons were hosted by actor Nagarjuna with the fourth being hosted by actor Chiranjeevi.

In 2021, after the completion of the first four seasons (2014–2017), the show was revamped with a new title Evaru Meelo Koteeswarulu under the production of Studio Next with Sun TV Network buying its broadcasting rights. It started to air on Gemini TV from 22 August 2021 to 5 December 2021, with N. T. Rama Rao Jr. as the host.

== Series overview ==
Official name	Season/ Year	Main Host	Original Network	First Aired	Last Aired	Episodes	Special Theme
Meelo Evaru Koteeswarudu	1 (2014)	Nagarjuna	Maa TV	9 June 2014	14 August 2014	42	None
Meelo Evaru Koteeswarudu	2 (2014–15)	Nagarjuna	Maa TV	8 December 2014	27 February 2015	55	None
Meelo Evaru Koteeswarudu	3 (2015–16)	Nagarjuna	Maa TV	27 November 2015	22 May 2016	73	Jodi Special
Meelo Evaru Koteeswarudu	4 (2017)	Chiranjeevi	Star Maa	13 February 2017	24 May 2017	60	Children's Special
Evaru Meelo Koteeswarulu	5 (2021)	N. T. Rama Rao Jr.	Gemini TV	22 August 2021	5 December 2021	62	None

== History and production ==
=== Debut (2014–2019) ===
In March 2014, reports emerged that Nagarjuna would host the Telugu version of Who Wants to Be a Millionaire? and the makers were in talks with him. With Nagarjuna confessing that he wanted to be a television game show host, the reports gained prominence. There were reports that Nagarjuna charged ₹3 crores for hosting 40 episodes for the first season. The reports of Nagarjuna's inclusion were confirmed in early April 2014 and Nagarjuna participated in the promo shoots. The official announcement was made on 18 April 2014 and the show was titled Meelo Evaru Koteeswarudu aired on MAA TV. The game show was launched in an event at Hyderabad. Nagarjuna and his wife Amala were present at the event, as were Allu Aravind, MAA TV Chairman Nimmagadda Prasad, CMD of BIG Synergy Siddhartha Basu and his wife Anitha. To introduce and educate the viewers about the show, Nagarjuna was seated on the hot seat and Amala took the role of host and asked questions about their personal life which were answered by Nagarjuna. Nagarjuna, Allu Aravind, Nimmagadda Prasad, and Siddhartha Basu spoke to the media about the game show.

The Call for Entry (CFE) was announced on 24 April 2014. The makers asked registrants to answer the five questions asked by replying with an SMS. The registration lines were closed on May 1, 2014, and the selection process was supervised by Ernst & Young. The channel's call for participants received more than a million entries, of which 1500 were shortlisted through the randomized process. From among them, 100 contestants were selected through auditions in Vijayawada, Tirupati, and Hyderabad. The show was announced to go on the air on 9 June 2014 at 9:00 PM and by 6 June 2014 Nagarjuna completed shooting of 6 episodes. Nine participants from different socioeconomic backgrounds played the game in each episode. Every contestant's back-end story was recorded and addressed in the show. The prize money ranged from ₹1,000/- to ₹1 crore/-, and the rules were the same as the Hindi version. Those who answered all 15 questions correctly would win ₹1 crore. The show initially ran from 9:00 PM to 10:30 PM from Mondays to Thursdays, but it was later changed from Sunday to Thursday because of the show's success.

The shoot of 40 episodes of the first season ended on 18 July 2014 and the last episode of the first season was aired on 7 August 2014. In addition to contestants, celebrities such as Vidya Balan Shriya Saran, Allari Naresh, Naga Chaitanya, Vishal, Jhansi, Suma Kanakala, Pooja Hegde, Charmme, Lakshmi Manchu, Kajal Aggarwal and Chiranjeevi made guest appearances on the show.

Season 3 started on 26 November 2015, with a special theme of Jodi (couple). As the first step towards the launch of MEK Season 3, the CFE for the registration process commenced on 9 October and would continue for 10 days. As part of the CFE process, one question was broadcast every day at 7:00 PM on Maa TV. Those who were interested could respond before 6.30 PM the next day.

Season 4 was launched on 13 February 2017, hosted by Chiranjeevi.

=== Revival (since 2020) ===
In late 2020, the show makers planned the brand new season of the series on Gemini TV, broadcasting the show for the first time with N. T. Rama Rao Jr. as a host. The title and logo of the show also changed during this time. In March 2021, it was reported that the filming would begin with a live audience. However, it was indefinitely postponed due to the second wave of the COVID-19 pandemic in India. Popular television director Arun Sheshkumar was roped in to direct the first few episodes of this season. Filming started on 10 July 2021, with Rama Rao joining the production. The first schedule of the shoot lasted for ten days. A celebrity guest episode featuring Ram Charan was also shot during the schedule.

== Format ==
The standard Who Wants to be a Millionaire? format is used, with the Fastest Finger contest before the main game.

=== Game rules ===
Question number	Question Value	Missed answer value	Amount lost if the wrong answer
1	₹1,000/-	₹0/-	₹0/-
2	₹2,000/-	₹1,000/-	₹0/-
3	₹3,000/-	₹2,000/-	₹0/-
4	₹5,000/-	₹3,000/-	₹0/-
5	₹10,000/-	₹5,000/-	₹0/-
6	₹20,000/-	₹0/-	₹10,000/-
7	₹40,000/-	₹10,000/-	₹10,000/-
8	₹80,000/-	₹30,000/-	₹10,000/-
9	₹1,60,000/-	₹70,000/-	₹10,000/-
10	₹3,20,000/-	₹1,50,000/-	₹10,000/-
11	₹6,40,000/-	₹0/-	₹3,20,000/-
12	₹12,50,000/-	₹3,20,000/-	₹3,20,000/-
13	₹25,00,000/-	₹9,30,000/-	₹3,20,000/-
14	₹50,00,000/-	₹21,80,000/-	₹3,20,000/-
15	₹1 Crore/-	₹46,80,000/-	₹3,20,000/-

The money won after each question is roughly doubled from the previous amount won, exponentially increasing the amount won after each correct answer until the contestant reaches the final question, when they win the maximum prize (₹1 crore/-).

=== Lifelines ===
A contestant can use a lifeline when he/she is undecided about which answer is correct. A lifeline can only be used once.

- Audience Poll: If the contestant uses this lifeline, it will result in the host repeating the question to the audience. The studio audience gets 10 seconds to answer the question. Audience members use touch pads to designate what they believe the correct answer to be. After the audience has chosen their choices, the results are displayed to the contestant in percentages in bar-graph format and also shown on the monitors screens of the host and contestant, as well as the TV viewers.
- Phone a Friend: If the contestant uses this lifeline, the contestant is allowed to call one of the three pre-arranged friends, who all have to provide their phone numbers in advance. The host usually starts off by talking to the contestant's friend and introduces him/her to the viewers. After the introduction, the host hands the phone call over to the contestant who then immediately has 30 seconds to ask and hope for a reply from their friend. In season 5, the lifeline was renamed to "Video Call a Friend." Instead of three pre-arranged friends, instead, there are five.
- Fifty-Fifty (50/50): If the contestant uses this lifeline, the host will ask the computer to randomly remove and eliminate two of the "wrong" answers. This will leave one right answer and one wrong answer, resulting in a situation of eliminating 50% of the choices as well as having a 50% chance of getting the answer right if the contestant is in a situation of making a guess.
- Double Dip: This lifeline allows the contestant to make two guesses at a question. Getting both answers incorrect results in the contestant's winnings dropping back down to the last milestone achieved. This lifeline differs from others in that once the player has chosen to use this lifeline, he/she must answer the question, and cannot walk away or use any further lifelines on that question.
- Code Red: The lifeline, which gives the opportunity for the contestant's family members to warn the contestant if they feel the answer is wrong. Removed in season four.

=== Records ===
In the first 3 seasons, no one won the ₹1 crore/- prize in the show. However, in Season 3, two pairs of contestants, Husband-Wife duo Amarnath - Rohita from Vizag, and Mother-Son duo Uma - Aditya, also from Vizag, each won ₹50 lakhs/- and both attempted the ₹1 crore/- question accurately after quitting. However, in the 1st season of the revived version of the show, Raja Ravindra, a Sub Inspector from Hyderabad, became the first contestant out of all 5 seasons to win the ₹1 crore/- prize.

== Reception ==
As per the TAM data, MEK has recorded 17.61 TVR in CS Female AB 25-44 Years category, 14.58 TVR in CS Female ABC 25+ years category, 10.20 TVR in CS Male ABC 15+ Years category, 12.31 TVR in CS ABC 15-44 Years category and 10.15 TVR in CS 4+ Years category, which is a record of sort for a game show in Telugu.

One of the episodes in mid-June 2014 garnered a rating of 9.7 TVR and averaged 6.7 TVR that week becoming the fourth most-watched Telugu GEC at that time. The following month it garnered its peak rating of 10.8 TVR, consistently maintaining its position in top Telugu GEC since four weeks.
