= Sell Me the Answer =

Television series

- Presented by: Gethin Jones
- Country of origin: United Kingdom
- Original language: English
- No. of series: 1
- No. of episodes: 50

Production
- Running time: 60 minutes (inc. adverts)
- Production company: Thumbs Up

Original release
- Network: Sky 1
- Release: 9 November 2009 – 29 January 2010

Sell Me The Answer is a game show that aired on Sky 1 from 9 November 2009 to 29 January 2010 and is hosted by Gethin Jones.

== Format ==
One contestant plays the game at a time, and is given an initial stake of £50. They are then asked a series of 10 questions, each of which awards an increasingly larger amount of money if answered correctly. However, an incorrect answer at any time ends the game and sends the contestant home with nothing.

Sixty members of the public are chosen to act as "traders" during each game, seated in the area normally reserved for a studio audience. The contestant may request help on any question by shouting, "Sell me the answer!", whereupon the traders attempt to get their attention by shouting and waving numbered paddles. The contestant chooses two traders, who are each given 10 seconds to convince the contestant that they know the answer. After choosing one of these, the contestant and that trader have 30 seconds to negotiate a price for the trader's assistance, up to and including the contestant's total winnings to that point. If a deal is made, the agreed-upon price is deducted from the contestant's total and paid to the trader, who then gives their answer. If not, the trader receives nothing and the contestant must answer on their own. Each trader may only be used once per game, and the contestant may only use one trader per question.

The contestant may either use a trader's answer or reject it in favour of a different one as they see fit. Any money paid to a trader is theirs to keep, whether the contestant uses their answer or not. Traders may bluff at their discretion, in an attempt to get money from the contestant even if they are not sure of an answer or have no idea what it might be.

If the contestant answers all 10 questions correctly, they must choose whether to end the game and keep their winnings, or attempt one final Jackpot Question with no help from any of the traders. A correct answer increases the contestant's total to £25,000, while a miss forfeits all winnings.

== Prize structure ==
Question values increase throughout the game as follows.

Question N^{o}	Question Value
Starter	£50
Q1	£75
Q2	£125
Q3	£250
Q4	£500
Q5	£1,000
Q6	£1,200
Q7	£1,400
Q8	£1,600
Q9	£1,800
Q10	£2,000

Any contestant who answers all 10 questions correctly will have a minimum of £2,000 in their pot if they spend all their money from questions 1 through 9 on assistance from the traders, and a maximum of £10,000 if they make no deals. A correct answer to the Jackpot Question increases the contestant's total to £25,000 regardless of their earlier performance.
