= Ke Hobe Banglar Kotipoti =

Bengali quiz show

- Bengali: কে হবে বাংলার কোটিপতি
- Genre: Quiz show
- Presented by: Sourav Ganguly (2011); Prosenjit Chatterjee (2018)
- Composers: Keith Strachan; Matthew Strachan; Ramon Covalo; Nick Magnus
- Country of origin: India
- Original language: Bengali
- No. of seasons: 2
- No. of episodes: 85

Original release
- Network: Mahuaa Bangla (2011); Colors Bangla (2018)
- Release: 4 June 2011

Related
- Kaun Banega Crorepati; Who Wants to Be a Millionaire?

Ke Hobe Banglar Kotipoti (transliterated: Kē kabē bānlāra kōṭipati), KHBK or KBC Bangla, is one of the 9 Indian versions for Bengali-speaking peoples based on the original British game show Who Wants to Be a Millionaire? It premiered on 4 June 2011, on Mahuaa Bangla channel hosted by Sourav Ganguly. In 2018, this show returned to air with new host Prosenjit Chatterjee. This version is the Indian version (also Marathi and Bhoupuji version) where the questions are only in the local language and not asked again in English.

== Lifelines ==
- Audience Poll:- If any contestant would use this lifeline, the host would repeat the question to the audience. The studio audience would get 10 seconds to answer the question. Audience members would use touchpads to give the answer what they believe. After the audience would have chosen their choices, their choices would be displayed to the contestant in percentages in bar-graph format and also shown on the monitors screens of the host and contestant, as well as the TV viewers.
- 50:50 (Fifty-fifty):- If the contestant would use this lifeline, the host would ask the computer to remove two of the wrong answers. This would remain one right answer and one wrong answer. This would help a contestant giving 50% chance of answering the correct answer.
- Phone A Friend:- If the contestant would use this lifeline, the contestant would be allowed to call one of the three pre-arranged friends, who all have to provide their phone numbers in advance. The host would usually be started off by talking to the contestant's friend and introduces him/her to the viewers. After the introduction, the host would hand the phone call over to the contestant, who then immediately had 30 seconds to ask and hope for a reply from their friend.

== Rules ==
=== Main game ===
Similar to another India version, the show used clock format. In season 1, every contestant had a time limit: 30 seconds for questions 1-5, and 45 seconds for questions 6-10. On questions 11-15, it goes away, giving the contestant as much time as they need to answer the questions. But in season 2, every contestant had clock: 45 seconds for answer the questions 1-5, 60 seconds for answer the questions 6-10 and for questions 11-15, clock disappeared (similar to season 1).

== Money Tree ==
Question Number	Winnings for right answer	Winnings if walk away	Winning for wrong answer
1	₹1,000/-	₹0/-	₹0/-
2	₹2,000/-	₹1,000/-	₹0/-
3	₹3,000/-	₹2,000/-	₹0/-
4	₹5,000/-	₹3,000/-	₹0/-
5	₹10,000/- (guaranteed sum)	₹5,000/-	₹0/-
6	₹20,000/-	₹10,000/-	₹10,000/-
7	₹40,000/-	₹20,000/-	₹10,000/-
8	₹80,000/-	₹40,000/-	₹10,000/-
9	₹1,60,000/-	₹80,000/-	₹10,000/-
10	₹3,20,000/- (guaranteed sum)	₹1,60,000/-	₹10,000/-
11	₹6,40,000/-	₹3,20,000/-	₹3,20,000/-
12	₹12,50,000/-	₹6,40,000/-	₹3,20,000/-
13	₹25,00,000/-	₹12,50,000/-	₹3,20,000/-
14	₹50,00,000/-	₹25,00,000/-	₹3,20,000/-
15	₹1,00,00,000/-	₹50,00,000/-	₹3,20,000/-

== Winners ==
=== Top Prize Winners ===
- Aamir Khan and Kiran Rao (8 July 2011)

=== Rs. 50,00,000/- winners ===
- Rani Mukherjee (12 August 2011)

=== Rs. 25,00,000/- winners ===
- Sayonti Goswami (22 August 2018)
- Jayanta Maity (28 August 2018)

=== Rs. 12,50,000/- winners ===
- Koel Mallick (17 June 2011)
- Sumit Bhattacharya (17 July 2018)
- Sohini Kayal (3 August 2018)
- Prabir Kumar Sarbar (15 August 2018)
- Pampa Chakraborty (23 August 2018)
- Partha Ghosh (30 August 2018)
- Soumitra Chatterjee (31 August 2018)

=== Rs. 640,000/- winners ===
- Abhibrata Dey (19 July 2018)
- Payel Mukherjee (23 July 2018)
- Ranita Basu (27 July 2018)
- Indranil Bose (7 August 2018)
- Pratyusha Das (8 August 2018)
- Usha Uthup (17 August 2018)

=== Rs. 320,000/- winners ===
- Pranab Kumar (27 July 2018)
- Soumita Das (31 July 2018)
- Chitralekha Mondal (1 August 2018)
- Jashan Goswami (3 August 2018)
- Srabanti Chatterjee (10 August 2018)
- Nusrat Jahan and Shraddha Rati (24 August 2018)
- Pankaj Goon (27 August 2018)

=== Rs. 160,000/- winners ===
- Prasoon Pal (20 July 2018)
- Sirsha Ray (20 July 2018)
- Payel Mukherjee (23 July 2018)
- Uttam Paul ( 22 July, 2011)

=== Rs. 10,000/- winners ===
- Prasanta Chakraborty (2011)
- Ashim Kumar Jana (18 July 2018)
- Dipyendu Ghosh (18 July 2018)
- Sagarika Ghosh (9 August 2018)
- Santu Jana (16 August 2018)
- Sajal Das (29 August 2018)
- Writambhara Das (31 August 2018)

=== Rs. 5,000/- winners ===
- Jayanti Mitra (17 August 2018)
