= Kannadada Kotyadhipati =

Indian Kannada language quiz game show

- Created by: David Briggs; Mike Whitehill; Steven Knight
- Directed by: Raghavendra Hunsur and Guru Prasad (Season 1–2); Shraddha Jain (Season 4)
- Presented by: Puneeth Rajkumar (Season 1,2 & 4); Ramesh Aravind (Season 3)
- Composers: Keith Strachan; Matthew Strachan; Ramon Covalo; Nick Magnus
- Country of origin: India
- Original language: Kannada
- No. of seasons: 4

Production
- Running time: 90 minutes
- Production company: BIG Synergy

Original release
- Network: Star Suvarna (Season 1–3); Colors Kannada (Season 4)
- Release: 12 March 2012 – present

Kannadada Kotyadhipati (transl. Kannada's Crorepati) is an Indian Kannada language Quiz show, produced by BIG Synergy, based on Who Wants to Be a Millionaire?.

== Background ==
After a series of new ideas in reality and fiction shows, the Star Network's Kannada general entertainment channel, Asianet Suvarna, announced another game show - Kannadada Kotyadhipati based on the game show Who Wants to Be a Millionaire?. The show, which is meant for a common Kannadiga, offers the prize money of ten million Rs. The format and the rules for the edition of Kannadada Kotyadhipati will be same as the first edition of KBC. The show will be anchored by the actor Puneeth Rajkumar. Making his debut as an anchor for the first time on television Puneet Rajkumar expressed, "I am excited about being the anchor of this show which will give me an opportunity to interact closely with the common people. The format of the show is unique as this gives the common people an opportunity to use their knowledge and change their lives. Kannadada Kotyadhipati is produced by Big Synergy the same production house as KBC."

According to the Business Head of Suvarna, Anup Chandrasekharan, "The Star Network originally brought in KBC to India and made it the most popular reality show in the country. We at Suvarna have the best ingredients to make Kannadada Kotiyadipati a successful show."

There is only one 1 Crore winner till now: Hussain Basha in the second season of the show.

== Rules ==
The contestants must undergo an initial round of "Fastest Finger First", in which the host introduces the ten contestants of the episode and asks them all the same question. The contestants must then arrange the answers in the order described in the question. The contestant that places the four options in the correct order in the fastest time gets the chance to go on the hotseat.

== Lifelines ==
A contestant can use a lifeline when he/she is undecided about which answer is correct. A lifeline can only be used once. The current lifelines in Kannadada Kotyadhipati:

50:50:When contestant used this lifeline, the computer will be removal 2 wrong answer (Except season 3).

Audience Poll: If the contestant uses this lifeline, it will result in the host repeating the question to the audience. The studio audience get 30 seconds to answer the question. Audience members use touch pads to designate what they believe the correct answer to be. After the audience have chosen their choices, the results are displayed to the contestant in percentages in bar-graph format and also shown on the monitors screens of the host and contestant, as well as the TV viewers.

Phone a Friend: If the contestant uses this lifeline, the contestant is allowed to call one of the three pre-arranged friends, who all have to provide their phone numbers in advance. The host usually starts off by talking to the contestant's friend and introduces him/her to the viewers. After the introduction, the host hands the phone call over to the contestant who then immediately has 30 seconds to ask and hope for a reply from their friend.

Double Dip ×2: If the contestant uses this lifeline, the contestant is asked to choose two options among the four. If the contestant chooses an option that results in incorrect answer, he/she has another opportunity to opt among the remaining three options. There will be one correct answer and two incorrect at this situation. The contestant cannot quit the game if he/she uses this lifeline (this lifeline appearance in season 3, replacing 50:50, and become 4th lifeline in season 4)

The Game's prizes
- ₹1,000/-
- ₹2,000/-
- ₹3,000/-
- ₹5,000/-
- ₹10,000/-
- ₹20,000/-
- ₹40,000/-
- ₹80,000/-
- ₹1,60,000/-
- ₹3,20,000/-
- ₹6,40,000/-
- ₹12,50,000/-
- ₹25,00,000/-
- ₹50,00,000/-
- ₹1,00,00,000/-

== Notable celebrity guests ==
The following celebrities have played Kannadada kotyadhipati.

Guest(s)	Amount won	Notes
Ramya	₹3,20,000/-	First celebrity guest to play the game.
Lakshmi	₹1,60,000/-	The amount she won was given as a charity to a blind children orphanage.
V. Ravichandran	₹12,50,000/-	To celebrate the 50th Episode. The amount won was left with Puneeth to be given to the apt donee. Which in turn was handed out in part to a boy with a rare blood related disorder and the rest was divided between the final participants of the last episode of the children's season.
Prabhudeva	₹25,00,000/-	The amount was denoted to charity
Anil Kumble	₹25,00,000/-	The amount he won will be given to a cancer research hospital and to Kumble foundation for wild life conservation.
Akul Balaji	₹1,60,000/-	The amount will be donated to a Haemophilia children society
Sihi Kahi Chandru	₹3,20,000/-	To Manonandhana
Srujan Lokesh	₹6,40,000/-	Amount won is donated to Brahma charitable trust
Upendra	₹6,40,000/-	The prize money that Upendra was donated to Balyaalu and Chinchalagoppe village schools in Karnataka.
Jaggesh	₹3,20,000/-	The prize money that Jaggesh won was donated to an educational institution.
Radhika Pandit	₹3,20,000/-	The prize money that Radhika Pandit was donated to Anand Ashraya and Parignan Foundation which is situated in North canara.
Yash	₹25,00,000/-	Yash has donated the money for the welfare of the people through his NGO Yashomarga Foundation.
