= Neengalum Vellalam Oru Kodi =

Indian-Tamil language game show

- Logo
- Created by: David Briggs; Steven Knight; Mike Whitehill
- Presented by: Suriya (Season 1); Prakash Raj (Season 2); Arvind Swamy (Season 3)
- Country of origin: India
- Original language: Tamil
- No. of seasons: 3
- No. of episodes: 231

Production
- Running time: 90 minutes
- Production company: BIG Synergy

Original release
- Network: Star Vijay
- Release: 27 February 2012 – 19 November 2016

Neengalum Vellalam Oru Kodi (transl. You Too Can Win 1 Crore), also known by the initialism NVOK, is an Indian Tamil-language game show. It is the official Indian Tamil adaptation of the Who Wants to Be a Millionaire?.

Since its inaugural episode on 27 February 2012, the show has aired on Star Vijay. The show's first season was hosted by Suriya until its end on 12 July 2012. The show's second season, hosted by Prakash Raj, commenced on 11 March 2013 and ended on 12 July 2013. After a two-year hiatus, the show's third season commenced with a slightly altered format on 30 May 2016 with Aravind Swamy as host, and ended on 19 November 2016.

== Background ==
K. Sriram, the general manager of Star Vijay, claimed Neengalum Vellalam Oru Kodi to be "the first international format to hit the Tamil television screens". On the contrary, there was an earlier show named Deala No Deala, the Tamil adaptation of Deal or No Deal, which aired on Sun TV briefly in 2009–2010.

=== Other unrelated adaptations ===
Neengalum Vellalam Oru Kodi is unrelated to the show Ungalil Yaar Maha Latchathipathi, the official Sri Lankan Tamil adaptation of Who Wants to be a Millionaire which aired since 2011 in Shakthi TV. R. Sarathkumar had hosted a show titled Kodeeswaran, which followed a similar format and aired on Sun TV earlier. Likewise, Raadhika Sarathkumar went on to host a women-only version of the show called Kodeeswari in 2019–2020, which aired on Colors Tamil.

== Production ==
=== Season 1 ===
In April 2011, Business Standard reported that actor Prakash Raj would host the licensed Tamil edition of the Hindi game show Kaun Banega Crorepati, which was then titled Ungalil Yaar Kodeeswaran. Actor Vijay was also considered to host the reality game show, but he declined the offer. Eventually, it was confirmed that actor Suriya would host the show.

The title of Kaun Banega Crorepati's Tamil version was later confirmed as Neengalum Vellalam Oru Kodi. Suriya was initially apprehensive when approached, but after seeing the game format, he was "convinced it would work". The episodes for Neengalum Vellalam Oru Kodi were shot at AVM Studios in Chennai, where its Malayalam equivalent Ningalkkum Aakaam Kodeeshwaran was also shot. Suriya was paid ₹50 lakhs/- per episode, and 40 episodes were planned for Neengalum Vellalam Oru Kodi, thus amounting to a total remuneration of ₹20 crore/-.

=== Season 2 ===
In December 2012, Suriya stated that he could not host the second season due to his prior commitments. Subsequently, Prakash Raj, who was earlier considered for the show's first season, and whose previous appearance on television was in the 2003 Tamil serial Sahana, was finalised to host the show, making his debut as a television host.

=== Season 3 ===
In 2016, three years after the second season ended, Star Vijay confirmed that the show was renewed for a third season. Arvind Swamy, who was a celebrity guest on the show in the previous season, was announced as the host. The season commenced on 30 May 2016, with a slightly altered format; such as two contestants per game, a new lifeline called double-dip (replacing the 50-50 option), and the ability for players to set their preferred safe-heaven amount on the money tree prior to playing.

== Game rules ==
=== Show format ===
The contestants must undergo an initial round of "Fastest Finger First", in which the host introduces the ten contestants of the episode and asks them all the same question. The contestants must then arrange the answers in the order described in the question. The contestant that places the four options in the correct order in the fastest time gets the chance to go on the "hotseat", i.e. playing the main game. All contestants must be over the age of 18 and a citizen and resident of India to be eligible. The person must not be a former contestant of the show and must be able to converse well in English or Tamil languages.

Each player will be asked fifteen questions, the prizes starting at ₹1,000/- and leading up to ₹1 crore/-. The first five questions are considered to be relatively easy. The player has 30 seconds per question. The second five are relatively harder. The time limit for these is 45 seconds per question. The final five are considered to be the most difficult hard and become increasingly more so. These have no timer and contestants can think for as long as they want. There can be, and generally is, more than one player per episode.

The show's host asks each contestant a number of multiple-choice questions. Of the four options, only one is correct. Players answer correctly to win an amount of money. They are then shown the next question and four answers. Successive questions are worth a greater sum of money. In most cases, this is double the previous sum. Players who answer questions five and ten correctly find themselves in a situation where their winnings are "safe". This means they will not lose their winnings under any circumstances. This allows the players to hazard a guess for question six and question eleven. Players answering a question incorrectly are eliminated from the game and their winnings return to the previous "safe" amount. If the contestant was in the process of answering questions one to five, the safe amount would be zero; for those answering questions six to ten, the safe amount will be ₹10,000/-, and for questions eleven to fifteen, it will be ₹3,20,000/-. Players can decide to stop at any time, after seeing the next question, and take the winnings they have accumulated up to that point.

=== The lifelines ===
For assistance, the contestant can use one, two or all three "lifelines" at any time during the game. Contestants can use a lifeline when they are undecided which answer is correct. A contestant can use each lifeline only once. He can also use all lifelines on one question.

- Audience Poll: The host repeats the question to the studio audience. When requested, the audience must now press a button in front of them within ten seconds to indicate which option they think is correct answer. The computer then displays the results as a percentage to help the player make a choice.
- Phone A Friend: With this lifeline, the player may call one of up to three pre-arranged friends and ask for help. The host calls the player's friend and introduces him/her to the viewers. The question is only read out by the contestant to the phone friend once the host allows him or her to. The phone friend has 30 seconds to hear the question and answer.
- 50-50: When the player chooses this lifeline, the host tells the computer to randomly eliminate two of the "wrong" answers. This will leave one right answer and one randomly selected wrong answer.
- Double Dip (x2): This lifeline was introduced in season 3. By using this lifeline the candidate has the option to choose two answers for a single question. When this lifeline is used the timer is stopped and the candidate has to lock his/her first answer. If it is right the candidate can proceed to play for the next question. If wrong the candidate will be given a second chance to lock another answer while the timer is started again. On the use of this lifeline the candidate is not allowed to use any other lifelines. He or she is also not allowed to quit the game when this lifeline is used.

== Notable participants ==
=== Season 1 ===
Guest(s)	Amount won
Shruti Haasan	₹6,40,000
Ma Ka Pa Anand and Bhavana Balakrishnan	₹1,60,000/-
Sivakarthikeyan and Kalyani	₹10,000/-
Senthil and Rajasekar	₹6,40,000/-
Divyadarshini and Deepak	₹1,60,000/-
C. Gopinath	₹12,50,000/-
Jagan and Ramya	₹3,20,000/-
Ravichandran Ashwin	₹12,50,000/-
Karthi	₹12,50,000/-
Vimal, Anjali, Shiva and Oviya	₹80,000/-
Jayam Ravi and M. Raja	₹12,50,000/-
Srinivas and Nithyashree Mahadevan	₹6,40,000/-
Naresh Iyer and Haricharan	₹6,40,000/-
Karthik	₹6,40,000/-
Benny Dayal and Swetha Mohan	₹6,40,000/-
Sathyaraj and Radha	₹6,40,000/-
Prathap Pothan and Khushbu	₹6,40,000/-
Nadhiya and Rahman	₹6,40,000/-
Suhasini and Mohan	₹12,50,000/-

=== Season 2 ===
Guest(s)	Amount won
Kamal Haasan and Gautami	₹50,00,000/-
Arvind Swamy	₹25,00,000/-
Vijay Sethupathi	₹12,50,000/-
Sridevi	₹6,40,000/-
Radhika Sarathkumar	₹12,50,000/-
Sivakarthikeyan	₹12,50,000/-
Prasanna and Sneha	₹12,50,000/-
Hansika Motwani	₹3,20,000/-
Suriya	₹50,00,000/-

=== Season 3 ===
Guest(s)	Amount won
Ma Ka Pa Anand and Kavin	₹12,50,000/-
Divyadharshini and C. Gopinath	₹12,50,000/-
Erode Mahesh and Thadi Balaji	₹6,40,000/-
Meena and Nainika	₹6,40,000/-
Keerthy Suresh	₹12,50,000/-
Vijay Sethupathi	₹12,50,000/-
Amit Bhargav and Vandana	₹3,20,000/-
Kajal Aggarwal	₹6,40,000/-
Senthil and Sreeja	₹3,20,000/-
Ashok Selvan	₹3,20,000/-
Rio Raj and Gayathri	₹3,20,000/-
Jayam Ravi and Aarthi	₹12,50,000/-

== Reception ==
During its first season, Neengalum Vellalam Oru Kodi received major criticism for the questions asked to participants due to their apparently low difficulty. K. Sriram later noted, "the questions were not silly, the options were mocking. The feedback we got was: Don't mock your own questions. We've taken it as constructive feedback and put it to the Big Synergy team".
