= Sananda TV =

Defunct Indian TV channel

- Sananda TV's logo
- Country: India
- Network: cable television network
- Headquarters: Kolkata, West Bengal, India

Programming
- Language: Bengali
- Picture format: 4:3 1080p SDTV

Ownership
- Owner: ABP Group

History
- Launched: 25 July 2011; 14 years ago
- Closed: 7 November 2012; 13 years ago

Links
- Website: sanandatv.com

Sananda TV (Bengali: সানন্দা টিভি) was a 24-hour Bengali General Entertainment Channel owned by ABP Group. It was launched on 25 July 2011. However, it was shut down on 7 November 2012.

== Programs broadcast by Sananda TV ==
- Jeet
- Alpo Alpo Premer Galpo
- Amar Naam Joyeeta
- Ami Sei Mey
- Bengali Movie (This program showed several Bengali films)
- Bindi (A soap opera on two girls' life who are poles apart from each other)
- Bhola Maheshwar (A mythological and spiritual drama on Lord Shiva's life)
- Josh
- Mrs Sinha Roy (Aired on the 2030 HRS (IST) slot. The show was aborted inadvertently)
- Nader Nemai (A mythological and spiritual drama on Chaitanya Mahaprabhu or Nemai)
- Nayika (second successful show after Bindi ended abruptly for financial reasons)
- Proloy Asche (A 50-episode daily serial directed and produced by noted Bengali film director Raj Chakraborty aired on Mon-Fri at 2200 HRS (IST) slot)
- Rannabati (Cookery show)
- Sobinoy Nibedon (A drama based on the situation after a Marwari girl marries a Bengali boy)
- Ta Bole Ki Prem Debo Na
- Jabab Kinte Chai

== Closure ==
Sananda TV shut down 15 months after its launch on 7 November 2012.

== See also ==
- ABP Group
- Sananda
- ABP Ananda
