= Ke Bani Crorepati =

Indian-Bhojpuri quiz show

- Genre: Quiz show
- Based on: Who Wants To Be A Millionaire?
- Presented by: Shatrughan Sinha
- Music by: Keith Strachan; Matthew Strachan; Ramon Covalo; Nick Magnus
- Country of origin: India
- Original language: Bhojpuri
- No. of seasons: 1
- No. of episodes: 50

Production
- Production company: BIG Synergy

Original release
- Network: Mahuaa TV
- Release: 6 June – 12 August 2011

Ke Bani Crorepati or KBC Bhojpuri is the one of nine Indian Kaun Banega Crorepati versions for Bhojpuri-speaking peoples, based from British quiz show Who Wants to Be a Millionaire?. It was aired from 6 June to 29 July 2011, on Mahuaa TV channel. It was hosted by Shatrughan Sinha. Top prize was ₹ 1,00,00,000/-.

== Rules ==
=== Main game ===
In this show, the show appeared the clock. Each contestant had 30 seconds for questions 1-5 and 45 seconds for questions 6-10. From questions 11-15, the clock was absent and contestants can thinking how long as desired.

== Lifelines ==
In this season, three lifelines used:

- 50:50:- If the contestant would use this lifeline, the host would ask the computer to remove two of the wrong answers. This would remain one right answer and one wrong answer. This would help a contestant giving 50% chance of answering the correct answer.
- Phone-a-Friend:- If the contestant would use this lifeline, the contestant would be allowed to call one of the three pre-arranged friends, who all have to provide their phone numbers in advance. The host would usually be started off by talking to the contestant's friend and introduces him/her to the viewers. After the introduction, the host would hand the phone call over to the contestant, who then immediately had 30 seconds to ask and hope for a reply from their friend.
- Audience Poll:- If any contestant would use this lifeline, the host would repeat the question to the audience. The studio audience would get 10 seconds to answer the question. Audience members would use touchpads to give the answer what they believe. After the audience would have chosen their choices, their choices would be displayed to the contestant in percentages in bar-graph format and also shown on the monitors screens of the host and contestant, as well as the TV viewers.

== Money Tree ==
Question	Correct Answer Value	Walk Away Value	Miss Answer Value	Amount Lost if Wrong Answer
15	₹ 1,00,00,000/-	₹ 50,00,000/-	₹ 3,20,000/-	₹ 46,80,000/-
14	₹ 50,00,000/-	₹ 25,00,000/-	₹ 3,20,000/-	₹ 21,80,000/-
13	₹ 25,00,000/-	₹ 12,50,000/-	₹ 3,20,000/-	₹ 9,30,000/-
12	₹ 12,50,000/-	₹ 6,40,000/-	₹ 3,20,000/-	₹ 3,20,000/-
11	₹ 6,40,000/-	₹ 3,20,000/-	₹ 3,20,000/-	₹ 0/-
10	₹ 3,20,000/-	₹ 1,60,000/-	₹ 10,000/-	₹ 1,50,000/-
9	₹ 1,60,000/-	₹ 80,000/-	₹ 10,000/-	₹ 70,000/-
8	₹ 80,000/-	₹ 40,000/-	₹ 10,000/-	₹ 30,000/-
7	₹ 40,000/-	₹ 20,000/-	₹ 10,000/-	₹ 10,000/-
6	₹ 20,000/-	₹ 10,000/-	₹ 10,000/-	₹ 0/-
5	₹ 10,000/-	₹ 5,000/-	₹ 0/-	₹ 5,000/-
4	₹ 5,000/-	₹ 3,000/-	₹ 0/-	₹ 3,000/-
3	₹ 3,000/-	₹ 2,000/-	₹ 0/-	₹ 2,000/-
2	₹ 2,000/-	₹ 1,000/-	₹ 0/-	₹ 1,000/-
1	₹ 1,000/-	₹ 0/-	₹ 0/-	₹ 0/-

== Winners ==
=== Top Prize Winners ===
- Rajesh Singh - ₹ 1,00,00,000/- (27 July 2011)

=== The biggest winners ===
- Sonakshi Sinha - ₹ 25,00,000/- (17 June 2011)
- Kaushalendra Kumar Shukla - ₹ 25,00,000/- (22 June 2011)
- Dr. Kuldip Singh - ₹ 25,00,000/- (13 July 2011)
- Hema Malini - ₹ 25,00,000/- (29 July 2011)
- Dharmendra - ₹ 25,00,000/- (8 August 2011)

=== ₹ 0/- winners ===
- Tiku Chhabra (4 August 2011) (4th question wrong)

== Controversy ==
Shatrughan Sinha filed a report against the top officials of Mahuaa channel. He hosts the game show Ke Bani Crorepati, which is based on Kaun Banega Crorepati and confirms that the makers of the show did not give many of the celebrity guests, the amount they won on the show. Not that the celebrities are asking, but most of that money was supposed to go for charity, and that makes the Shatrughan even more furious. He has convicted the makers for approximately ₹ 1.75 crore/-. As a good host of the show, Sinha had roped in celebs like Dharmendra, Hema Malini, Govinda and Sonakshi Sinha and along with former finance minister, Yashwant Sinha as guest participants. Also, the BJP parliamentarian accused the channel of subtracting ₹ 25 lakhs/- as tax deducted at source (TDS) from his remuneration, but never depositing that amount to the Income Tax department. The program was produced by BIG Synergy Media Limited for Mahuaa, who had contacted Sonakshi Sinha’s father in early 2011 to anchor the show, which was to have 50 episodes in all with prize money amounting to ₹ 1 crore/-. According to Sinha all these were done in bad faith and the channel must, at once, pay the dues. Bollywoodlife.com said that he did a very noble deed by taking the matter to the police.
