= Kon Honar Crorepati =

Indian-Marathi quiz show

- Also known as: Kon Hoeel Marathi Crorepati
- Presented by: Sachin Khedekar (1–2; 5–7); Swapnil Joshi (3); Nagraj Manjule (4); Madhuri Dixit-Nene (8)
- Country of origin: India
- Original language: Marathi
- No. of seasons: 8
- No. of episodes: 192

Production
- Camera setup: Multi-camera
- Running time: 60–90 minutes

Original release
- Network: ETV Marathi (1–3); Sony Marathi (4–8)
- Release: 6 May 2013 – present

Kon Hoeel Marathi Crorepati or Kon Honar Crorepati (transl. Who will be a millionaire?) is an Indian game show presented in Marathi language on ETV Marathi and later on Sony Marathi. It is the official Indian Marathi adaptation of the British quiz show Who Wants to Be a Millionaire? and its Hindi adaptation Kaun Banega Crorepati hosted by Amitabh Bachchan.

The Marathi version of this show will be featuring Marathi actor Sachin Khedekar as the anchor. The third season is being hosted by comedian Swapnil Joshi. Later the show mainly hosted by film director Nagraj Manjule, the season also introduced Karamveer special episodes about people who did extraordinary work in social sector in the show. First Karamveer is being called on show was Adhik Kadam who worked for the children of Jammu and Kashmir since 1997 and helping communities with emergency medical services by providing Ambulances, doctors, paramedics but mostly love and respect.

== Format ==
Before the main game, contestants had selected to the show will playing Fastest Finger First to qualify to the game.

The host will ask a set of 15 questions, and the contestant who answers all of them correctly will be awarded a prize of ₹1,00,00,000 (1 crore).

The questions each have a time limit (similar to another India version) with 30 seconds in first 5 questions, 45 second in next 5 question and no time limit in the 5 last questions. each successive correct response increases the assigned prize in a way that the 15th correct response awards 1 crore rupees.

The game will have 3 lifelines, which are the following:

- 50-50, where 2 incorrect options are removed
- Phone A Friend, where a friend will assist
- Audience Poll, where the audience will vote on the question asked to the contestant and select an option of their choice. The options with their corresponding votes will be graphically represented and the contestant will have to make a choice among those.
- Code chat: for season 3 (replaced Audience poll)
- Double dip: for season 3 (replaced 50:50)

Selecting a wrong answer will lead to immediate termination and the contestant will have to leave with only the amount of prize assigned for the nearest 5th correct response (meaning if the contestant gets the 1st through 5th question wrong, he ends up with nothing, or if the contestant gets the 6th through 10th question wrong, then he ends up with only the prize for the 5th correct response, and so on and so forth so that if the contestant gets the 11th through 15th question wrong, then he ends up with only the prize for the 10th correct response).

That said, the contestant will have the power to quit at any moment of the show to receive the current prize and avoid risking loss of prize for all correct responses past the nearest 5th correct response.

== Seasons ==
The award prize in Season 1 was Rs. 1 crore. In Season 2, the award prize was increased to Rs. 2 crores. Season 3 was hosted by Swapnil Joshi. The show started in 6 May 2013 on ETV Marathi.

The 4th and 5th season aired on Sony Marathi. The 4th season was hosted by Director Nagraj Manjule. Seasons 1, 2 and 5 were hosted by Sachin Khedekar.
