= Keith Strachan =

English composer and theatre director (born 1944)

- Born: 21 January 1944 (age 82); Consett, County Durham, England
- Occupations: Composer; theatre director
- Years active: 1960s–present
- Website: strachan.org

Keith Strachan (/ˈstrɔːn/ STRAWN or /ˈstrækən/ STRAK-ən; born 21 January 1944) is an English composer and theatre director. He co-wrote the song "Mistletoe and Wine", which got Cliff Richard the 1988 UK Christmas number one. His TV work includes the theme music for the worldwide franchise of Who Wants to Be a Millionaire?

== Background ==
Strachan attended Blaydon Grammar School and after reading maths and science at Queen Elizabeth College, London University he became a maths teacher including a spell at Sloane Grammar School for Boys in Chelsea, London. He then left teaching to work as a musical director in the London theatre.

== Career ==
Keith Strachan was a member of the rock band Swegas that was formed in the late 1960s. An ad was placed for an organist and bassist. Keith Strachan and Roy Truman applied for the positions and got the jobs. The band had influences from groups such as Blood Sweat & Tears and Chicago Transit Authority. In addition to playing organ with the band, he was also one of the vocalists.

In 1976 he co-wrote his first musical, Shoot Up at Elbow Creek. He also wrote The Little Match Girl, based on Hans Christian Andersen's short story, for the Orange Tree Theatre, Richmond, which contained the song "Mistletoe and Wine." HTV produced the play for television in 1986. Two years later, he received an Ivor Novello award for the song, when Cliff Richard released it as a single.

Throughout the 1980s and 1990s, he directed a series of pop and rock compilation musicals for Bill Kenwright. He also created the West End hit Dancing in the Streets.

In 1998, television production company Celador, for whom he had written the themes for The Detectives and Talking Telephone Numbers, called upon him to supply some music at short notice for a quiz show called Who Wants to Be a Millionaire? They requested that the pop song Pete Waterman had written be rearranged, but as Celador's brief required "something dramatic and full of tension", Strachan set about composing a new piece altogether. Working with his son Matthew, he took inspiration from a dissonant chord in "Mars" from Holst's The Planets suite. The show's huge domestic and international success means that the composition has made them millionaires. In 2002, Keith and Matthew Strachan were given an award by the American Society of Composers, Authors and Publishers (ASCAP) for the Who Wants to Be a Millionaire? theme.
