= Who Wants to Be a Millionaire? =

Game show franchise

- Created by: David Briggs; Mike Whitehill; Steven Knight
- Original work: Who Wants to Be a Millionaire? (1998–present)
- Owners: Celador (1998–2007); 2waytraffic (2007–present, in-name-only unit of Sony Pictures); Sony Pictures (2008–present)
- Years: 1998–present

Films and television
- Television series: Who Wants to Be a Millionaire? (see International versions)

Miscellaneous
- Theme park attraction: Who Wants to Be a Millionaire – Play It!
- Genre: Game show
- First aired: 4 September 1998; 28 years ago

Who Wants to Be a Millionaire? (WWTBAM) is an international television game show franchise of British origin, created by David Briggs, Mike Whitehill and Steven Knight. In its format, currently owned and licensed by Sony Pictures, contestants tackle a series of multiple-choice questions to win large cash prizes in a format that twists on many game show genre conventions – only one contestant plays at a time. Similar to radio quizzes, contestants are given the question before deciding whether to answer and have no time limit to answer questions. The cash prize increases as they tackle questions that become increasingly difficult, with the maximum offered in most variants of the format being an aspirational value in the respective local currency, such as £1 million in the British version, €1 million in most European versions, $1 million in the American version and ₹70 million (₹7 crore) in the Indian version.

The original British version debuted on 4 September 1998 on the ITV network, hosted by Chris Tarrant, and ran until 11 February 2014. A revived series of seven episodes to commemorate its 20th anniversary aired in May 2018, hosted by Jeremy Clarkson, and ITV renewed the show for several more series.

Since its debut, international variants of the show have been aired in around 100 countries, making it the best-selling TV format in television history, and is credited by some as paving the way for the boom in the popularity of reality television.

== History ==
The format of the show was created by David Briggs, Mike Whitehill and Steven Knight, who had earlier created a number of the promotional games for Tarrant's morning show on Capital FM radio, such as the bong game. Tentatively known as Cash Mountain, the show took its finalised title from a song written by Cole Porter for the 1956 film High Society, starring Frank Sinatra and Celeste Holm. Since the original version launched, several individuals have claimed that they originated the format and that Celador had breached their copyright. While many pursued litigation, they were all unsuccessful, and each claim was later settled out-of-court on an agreement/settlement.

In March 2006, original producer Celador announced that it was seeking to sell the worldwide rights to Millionaire, together with the rest of its British programme library, as the first phase of a sell-off of the company's format and production divisions. British television producer Paul Smith first had the idea to franchise the UK programme internationally. He developed a series of standards for international variants that ensured they mirrored the British original closely. For example, all hosts were required to appear on-screen wearing Armani suits, as Tarrant did in the UK; producers were forbidden from hiring local composers to create original music, instead using the same music cues used by the British version, and the lighting system and set design were to adhere faithfully to the way they were presented on the British version. Some of Smith's rules have been slightly relaxed over the years as the franchise's development has progressed.

2waytraffic ultimately acquired Millionaire and all of Celador's other programmes. Two years later, Sony Pictures Entertainment purchased 2waytraffic for £137.5 million. Sony Pictures currently owns and licences the show's format.

== Gameplay ==
=== Rules ===
A group of contestants on each episode play a preliminary round called "Fastest Finger First". All are given a question by the host and four answers which must be placed within a particular order; in the first season of the original version (1998) and the first four seasons of the Australian version (1999–2002), contestants have to answer a multiple-choice question. If any contestants are visually impaired, the host reads the question and four choices all at once, then repeats the choices after the music for the round begins. After time's up, the computer and the host will reveal the correct order (or the correct answer in the latter's case). The contestant who answers correctly in the fastest time goes on to play the main game. In the event that no one gets the question right, another question is given; if two or more contestants answer correctly and with the same time, they are given a tie-breaker to determine who will make a start into the game. This round is only used when a new contestant is being chosen to play the main round, and can be played more than once in an episode among those remaining within the group seeking to play the main game. In celebrity editions, the round is not used; celebrities automatically take part in the main game.

Once a contestant enters the main game, the host asks increasingly difficult general-knowledge questions, each with four possible answers. Correct responses increase the contestant’s prize fund. Contestants also have a set of lifelines, each usable once, and two safety nets that guarantee a minimum prize if they answer incorrectly after reaching designated cash values.

The early questions are generally straightforward, but later questions may prompt the host to ask whether the contestant’s answer is their final answer. Once confirmed, it cannot be changed. Contestants who are unsure can choose to walk away with their winnings. The host asks them to confirm this decision and usually invites them to state the answer they would have chosen, then reveals whether it was correct.

==== Original format ====
During the British original, between 1998 and 2007, the show's format focused on fifteen questions. The payout structure was as follows (questions at guaranteed levels are highlighted with a bolded text):

Question number	Question value
1	£100
2	£200
3	£300
4	£500
**5**	**£1,000**
6	£2,000
7	£4,000
8	£8,000
9	£16,000
**10**	**£32,000**
11	£64,000
12	£125,000
13	£250,000
14	£500,000
**15**	**£1,000,000**

Between 2007 and 2014, the number of questions was reduced to twelve; the overall change in format was later incorporated into a number of international markets over a period of four years, including the Arab world, Bulgaria, the Netherlands, France, Poland, Spain, and Turkey. The payout structure, as a whole, was subsequently changed as a result, with the second safety net relocated to £50,000 at question 7 (questions at guaranteed levels are highlighted with a bolded text):

Question number	Question value
1	£500
**2**	**£1,000**
3	£2,000
4	£5,000
5	£10,000
6	£20,000
**7**	**£50,000**
8	£75,000
9	£150,000
10	£250,000
11	£500,000
**12**	**£1,000,000**

The game show's revival for British television in 2018 reverted to the original arrangement used before 2007, but with one notable difference, in that the second safety net was made adjustable – once a contestant reached £1,000, the host asked them, before each subsequent question until a second safety net was set, if they wished to set the next cash prize amount as the second safety net, with this allowing them to set it as high as £500,000 in their game.

==== American format ====
The American version premiered on ABC in August 1999 as part of a two-week daily special event hosted by Regis Philbin. After this and a second two-week event aired in November 1999, ABC commissioned a regular series that launched in January 2000 and ran until June 2002. The syndication of the game show was conceived and debuted in September 2002. The only difference between it and the British version was episode length – 45 minutes, as opposed to the 60-minute length of the original version. The change meant that the preliminary round of the show Fastest Finger was eliminated, and contestants had to pass a more conventional game-show qualification test. After passing the qualification test and being chosen, when the show began, the host invited contestants to the studio. Exceptions to this arrangement, in which it was used under the name "Fastest Finger" included: primetime special editions of the program, the 2004 series that was dubbed Super Millionaire, in which the final prize was increased to $10,000,000, and for the 10th-anniversary special of the American edition, which ran during August 2009 for eleven episodes. The decision to remove this round later occurred in other international versions, including the British original, and several versions likes Russia, Holland and Costa Rica before its reinstatement in the renewed series.

===== Clock format =====
In 2008, the American version changed its format so that contestants were required to answer questions within a set time limit. The limit varied depending on the difficulty of the question:

Question number	Time limit
1–5	15 seconds
6–10	30 seconds
11–14	45 seconds
15	45 seconds (+ any accumulated remaining time from the previous 14 questions)

The clock started immediately after a question was given and the four possible answers appeared. The clock paused when a lifeline was used. If the clock ran out with no answer locked in, the contestant walked away with any prize money won up to that point, unless the "Double Dip" lifeline had been used, in which case a failure to give a second answer was treated the same as a wrong answer. This format change was later adopted into other international versions with several minor changes; the British original, for example, adopted this change for episodes from 3 August 2010 to 2014. The Indian version followed suit on 11 October 2010, the Egypt version followed suit on 20 July 2012 to May 15, 2013, the Turkish version followed suit on 2 August 2011, and the Israel version followed suit between 2020–2021.

===== Shuffle format =====
On 13 September 2010, the American version adopted another significant change to its format. In this change, the game featured two rounds. The first round consisted of ten questions, in which the cash prize associated to each value, along with the category and difficulty for each question, was randomised per game. As such, the difficulty of the question in this round was not tied to the value associated to it, and a contestant did not know what amount they won unless they provided a correct answer or chose to walk away. As part of this format, the amount of money a contestant won in this round was banked, but if they walked away before completing the round, they left with half the amount that had been banked; if they gave an incorrect answer during this round, they left with just $1,000. If they answered all ten questions correctly, they then moved on to the second round, which stuck to the standard format of the game show – the remaining questions were set to general knowledge and featured cash prizes of high, non-cumulative values. The contestant could, at this point, walk away with the total amount banked from the first round; otherwise, an incorrect answer meant they left with $25,000. The format was later modified for the fourteenth season of the American version but retained the same arrangement for the last four questions.

In 2015, the so-called "shuffle format" was scrapped and the show returned to a version that closely resembled the original format.

==== Other international formats ====
===== Risk format =====
In 2007, the German version modified the show's format with the inclusion of a new feature called "Risk Mode". During the main game, contestants are given the choice of choosing this feature, in which if they choose to use it, they gain the use of a fourth lifeline that allows them to discuss question with a member of the audience, in exchange for having no second safety net – if they get any question between the sixth and final cash prize amount wrong, they leave with the guaranteed amount given for correctly answering five questions. This format became adopted in Austria, the Czech Republic, Hungary, Italy, Philippines, Poland, Russia, Switzerland and Venezuela.

Multiple variants exist of this format. One variant keeps the rule of only one safety net but lets the contestant set it before the game begins. The UK 2018 revival also has a gameplay feature often attributed to the Risk format, allowing the player 2 safety nets, but they get to set their second safety net wherever they would like after the £1,000 threshold, but they can only do it for the question coming up next before they see the question.

The Taiwanese version did not have any safety nets or any option to quit; the contestant's winnings won up until they were incorrect on any question was cut by half.

===== Hot Seat format =====
In November 2008, the Italian version modified the format of the show under the title Edizione Straordinaria (lit. 'Extraordinary Edition'). In this variation of the game, six contestants take part, with each taking it in turns to answer questions and build up their prize fund. Utilising the time limit format introduced in the American version, this variation on the format grants a contestant the right to pass the question on to another player, who cannot pass it on themselves, while eliminating both the option of walking away from a question, and the use of lifelines. If a contestant cannot pass on or correctly answer a question, they are eliminated, and the highest cash value they made is removed. The game ends when all contestants are eliminated or the question for the highest cash value is answered – if a contestant who answers the final question gives a correct answer, they win that prize; if the final question is answered incorrectly, or the last contestant is eliminated, they win a small prize, provided they reach the fifth-question safety net. This format was later introduced to various markets over the course of a four-year-period from 2009 to 2012, including Norway, Hungary, Spain, Vietnam, Indonesia, Australia, and Chile.

In 2009, the Australian version was modified to use the new Italian format, and the name was also changed from "Extraordinary Edition" to "Hot Seat". In 2017, as part of new modification to the format, the game incorporated the use of the Fastest Finger First round, with the winner able to select a lifeline, out of three that the show provided.

In 2026, the UK also introduced Millionaire Hot Seat as a separate programme, whilst still continuing to produce the classic show. It follows a very similar ruleset as Australia's original Hot Seat format.

===== Gamblers' Special format =====
In 2013, the German version modified the show's format, which runs concurrent with the original format, where only one guaranteed level exists, at €1,000, and maximum prize is €2,000,000. But Contestents are not allowed to use a lifeline until Question 10(16000€) If they have to they lose all 4 lifelines and have to continue without a lifeline.

===== Tournament format =====
In 2025, the Italian version developed a new international format of the game show.

This format turns into a tournament divided into two phases: a qualifying phase and the climb to the million.

In the qualifying phase, divided into three qualifying rounds (Q1, Q2 and Q3), ten potential contestants compete against each other by answering 15 questions but having only 15 seconds to answer each question (as happened during the Fastest Finger First round in the original format). After every five questions, at the end of the qualifying round, the three with the fewest correct answers are eliminated, or, in the event of a tie, the slowest to answer. At the end of the qualifying phase, a ranking is drawn up, and only the top three (chosen based on the number of correct answers and the time taken to answer) advance to the climb to the million. The fourth place finisher acts as a reserve (in case one of the top three is incorrect within the first three questions).

Once the qualifications are completed, regardless of the outcome of the game, the third-place finisher wins €2,000, the second-place finisher €3,000, and the first-place finisher €5,000 as a guaranteed prize.

In the climb phase, each episode features three climbs, in order, from the slowest of the three qualified contestants to the fastest. The climb to the million consists of 10 questions ranging from a minimum of €10,000 to €1,000,000. Before the climb, each contestant can set their own intermediate goal, and in case of difficulty, each can use three aids: 50:50, Ask the Expert, and Switch the Question (from the sixth question). They also have the option to leave the game before the goal set at the start of the climb. The contestant who completes the first climb sits in the "leader's" chair, watching the progress of the next contestant, who must surpass the monetary goal reached by the previous contestant.

At the end of the episode, the three contestants who reach the highest point of the climb wins, and in the event of a tie, the one who took the shortest time in qualifying wins.

=== Lifelines ===
During a standard play of the game, a contestant is given a series of lifelines to aid them with questions. In the standard format, a contestant has access to three lifelines which each can be used only once per game. More than one lifeline can be used on a single question. The standard lifelines used in the original format of the game show include:

- **50:50 (Fifty-Fifty)** – The game's computer eliminates two wrong answers from the current question, leaving behind the correct answer and one incorrect answer. From 2000, the selection of two incorrect answers were random.
- **Phone-a-Friend** – The contestant is connected with a friend over a phone line and is given 30 seconds to read the question and answers and solicit assistance. The time begins as soon as the contestant starts reading the question. In the Colombian version, the timer only starts after the question has been read out.
- **Ask the Audience** – The audience takes voting pads attached to their seats and votes for the answer that they believe is correct. The computer tallies the results and displays them as percentages to the contestant. Many versions around the world removed this lifeline as the episodes were taped without an audience due to the COVID-19 pandemic.

In the US, "Ask the Audience" and "Phone a Friend" had corporate sponsorship at different periods. The original AT&T sponsored "Phone a Friend" during the original ABC primetime show and the syndicated version's first season; the current AT&T sponsored the 2009 primetime episodes. From 2004 to 2006, AOL sponsored "Ask the Audience" and allowed users of Instant Messenger to participate in the lifeline by adding the screen name MillionaireIM to their contact list. When a contestant used the lifeline during the show, users received an instant message with the question and the four possible answers and voted for the correct answer. The computer tallied these results alongside the results from the studio audience.

Contestants pre-select multiple friends for "Phone a Friend". As soon as the contestant begins to play, producers alert the friends and ask them to keep their phone lines free and wait for three rings before answering. On 11 January 2010, the American version eliminated the use of "Phone a Friend" in response to an increasing trend of contestants' friends using web search engines and other internet resources to assist them during the calls. Producers came to feel that the lifeline was giving contestants who had friends with internet access an unfair advantage; they also believed it was contrary to the original intent of the lifeline: friends provided assistance based on what they knew.

During recordings of the current British version, security personnel from the production office stay with contestants' friends at their homes to ensure integrity. During "The People Play" specials in 2012 and 2013, friends travelled to the studio and stayed backstage. When a contestant used the lifeline, the friend they called appeared on a monitor in the studio, and both the friend and contestant were able to see and communicate with each other.

==== Unique lifelines ====
During the course of the game show's history, there were a number of unique lifeline additions in various versions of the programme. These include, but are not limited, to:

- **Switch the Question** – Used in the American version between 2004 and 2008, and in the British original during celebrity specials between 2002 and 2003 and standard episodes between 2010 and 2014, this lifeline became available after a contestant answered the tenth question of the game. The computer replaced the current question with another of the same difficulty. The contestant could not reinstate any lifelines used on the original question. A variation of this lifeline for the American version called "Cut the Question", was brought into use in 2014 for a week-long run of special episodes that featured child contestants, in which the computer replaced the current question with an easier one, and it could only be used within the first ten questions. In the Indian version, this lifeline gives out a question from one out of 11 categories that the contestant chooses before filming instead of a random question. This lifeline was also included in the 2021 specials and the Hot Seat version of the Australian market.
- **Double Dip** – One of two lifelines created for the Super Millionaire spin-off of the American version. When used, this lifeline allowed contestants to have two guesses at a question but forbade them from using any other remaining lifelines or from walking away with their current winnings. Contestants can first use "50:50" and then used "Double Dip" on the same question, guaranteeing them the correct answer. When the standard US format incorporated a time limit on questions, the show retired "50:50" and replaced it with "Double Dip". This lifeline was also used in the Turkey version (with clock format), Philippines and Russian version (without a clock format) but did not replace "50:50".
- **Three Wise Men** – The other lifeline created for Super Millionaire. When chosen, a sequestered panel of three experts (chosen by the producers) appears via face-to-face audio and video feed to provide assistance. Like "Phone a Friend", this lifeline incorporated a 30-second time limit for its use. This lifeline was also used in the Russian version between 2006 and 2008 but did not feature experts. A variation, known as **Ask the Star**, which uses a panel of celebrities instead of quiz experts, was used in the final season of the Norwegian version and in the Swedish version since 2020.
- **Two Wise Men** – Used in the Vietnamese version of the show from episodes broadcast since 5 May 2020, replacing "Ask Three of the Audience". It has the same function as "Three Wise Men"; however, there are only two experts instead of three. It becomes available after the fifth question.
- **Ask the Expert** – Inspired by "Three Wise Men", this lifeline provided the contestant with one person, an expert selected for them, to help with the question. Unlike its predecessor, this lifeline had no time limit on its use, but was only available after the fifth question; after "Phone a Friend" was removed in 2010, it was made readily available at any time in the game. In the US version, the lifeline was sponsored by Skype for its live audio and video feeds. In the Hong Kong edition, it replaced the "Phone a Friend" lifeline for a one-off special in 2001 and for two celebrity specials in 2018, though, with the celebrity contestants able to ask a panel of experts for help, present in the audience, all of whom had the question and possible answers visible to them.
- **Ask One of the Audience** – Used in the German version of the show, this lifeline was designed for use as part of its "Risk Mode" format. When used, the contestant selects someone from the audience, whereupon the host rereads the question and the possible answers and asks them to choose one. If the contestant goes for the answer they chose and it is correct, the audience member is given a small cash prize in return (500€). This lifeline was implemented as part of other versions such as the 25th anniversary of the French version (the lifeline is renamed "Vox Populi").
- **Ask Three of the Audience** – This lifeline was designed for use as part of its original format. Used in the Vietnamese version of the show in episodes broadcast starting 20 May 2008, later replaced by "Two Wise Men" due to the COVID-19 pandemic. When used, the contestant selects three from the audience, whereupon the host re-reads the question and the possible answers and asks them to choose one. If the contestant goes for the answer they chose and it proves to be correct, the audience members are given a small cash prize in return (600,000 ₫ divided between those of the 3 members that answered correctly). This lifeline is made available passing the first safety net. In the Philippines version, the lifeline is called "People Speak", which can be used at any point in the game.
- **Jump the Question** – Used in the American version of the show, as part of the "shuffle format", from the start of the ninth season to the end of the thirteenth season. When used, prior to giving a final answer, a contestant skipped the current question and moved on to the next one but earned no money from the question they skipped; the lifeline could not be used if they have reached the final question. Unlike other lifelines, it could be used twice during a game, except for the thirteenth season – the introduction of "Plus One" led to the lifeline being modified as a result. The lifeline was removed following the 2014–2015 season.
- **Crystal Ball** – Used in the US version of the show, as part of specially designated weeks that used the "shuffle format". When used during the first round, the contestant is allowed to see the cash amount that is designated to the question they are currently on.
- **Plus One** – Used in the American version of the show from 2015 to 2019 and from 2020 to 2021. Based on "Ask One of the Audience", the lifeline allows a contestant to invite on a friend from the audience to come and help them answer the question. There is no time limit, but after that question has been answered the friend has to return to the audience.
- **Ask the Host** – Used in the 20th anniversary revival of the original British version; the Danish, French and Italian revivals; Slovenia; Bulgaria (since September 2024); Russia (January 2021 – June 2022), the 2020 reboot of the American version and in some special versions in Germany. When used by the contestant, the host uses their knowledge of a question's subject, gives their thoughts about the question, and tries to assist them with finding the correct answer out of the choices given. The lifeline features no time limit, and the host has no connection to the outside world or knowledge of the question and its possible answers in advance of it being shown to the contestant.

=== Top prize winners ===
Out of all contestants who have played the game, relatively few have been able to win the top prize on any international version of the show. The first was John Carpenter, who won the top prize on the American version on 19 November 1999. Carpenter famously did not use a lifeline until the final question, using his "Phone a Friend" to call his father, not for help, but to tell him he was about to become a millionaire.

Other notable top-prize winners include:

- Judith Keppel was the first winner of the original British version.
- In the American version, Kevin Olmstead won a progressive jackpot of $2.18 million.
- In the Australian version, Martin Flood was investigated by producers after suspicions that he had cheated, much like Charles Ingram, but was later cleared.
- In the Indian version, Sushil Kumar is often referred to in Western media as the "real-life Slumdog Millionaire".
- David Chang was the first celebrity winner of the American version.

== Original version ==
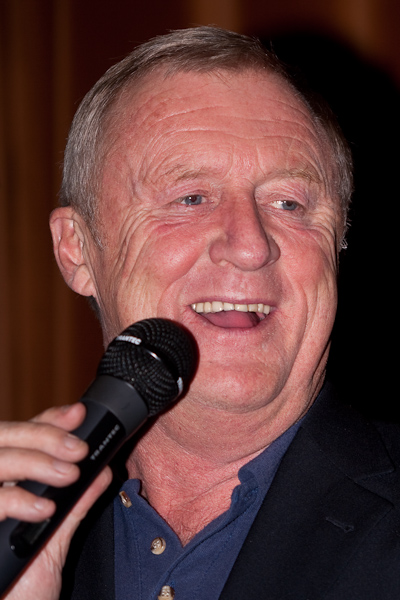
Chris Tarrant was host of the original British version, from its debut in September 1998, until its final episode in February 2014

Who Wants to Be a Millionaire? debuted in Britain on 4 September 1998, with episodes broadcast on the ITV network. When it began airing, the show was hosted by Chris Tarrant, and became an instant hit – at its peak in 1999, one edition of the show was watched by over 19 million viewers. While most of the contestants were predominantly members of the general public who had applied to take part, the show later featured special celebrity editions during its later years, often coinciding with holidays and special events.

On 22 October 2013, Tarrant decided to leave the programme after hosting it for 15 years. His decision subsequently led ITV to make plans to cancel the programme at the end of his contract, with no further specials being made other than those that were already planned. Tarrant's final episode was a special clip show entitled "Chris' Final Answer", which aired on 11 February 2014.

Four years later, ITV revived the programme for a special 7-episode series, to commemorate the 20th anniversary of the British original. This series of special episodes was hosted by Jeremy Clarkson and aired every evening between 5 and 11 May 2018. The revival received mostly positive reviews from critics and fans, and, as well as high viewing figures, led to ITV renewing the show for another series with Clarkson returning as host.

== International versions ==
Since the British original debuted in 1998, several different versions of Who Wants to Be a Millionaire? have been created across the world, including Australia, the United States, South Africa and India. In total over 100 different international variations have been made.

=== Australia ===
On 18 April 1999, Nine Network launched an Australian version of the game show for its viewers. This version ran until its final episode, aired on 3 April 2006. After the first version ended, a second version was created, running for six episodes across October and November 2007, before a third version, entitled Millionaire Hot Seat, made its debut on 20 April 2009. The original version was hosted by Eddie McGuire, until he was forced to sacrifice his on-air commitments upon being made the CEO of the network; after his resignation from this role, he resumed his duties as host of subsequent versions of the programme.

=== United States ===
On 16 August 1999, ABC launched an American version of the game show for its primetime viewers. Hosted by Regis Philbin, it proved to be a ratings success, becoming the highest-rated television show during the 1999–2000 season, with its average audience figures reaching approximately 29 million viewers. After a drop in ratings, this version was cancelled, with its final episode aired on 27 June 2002. On 16 September 2002, Meredith Vieira launched a daily syndicated version of the programme, which she hosted for 11 seasons, until May 2013. After her departure, the show was hosted by Cedric the Entertainer in 2013, and Terry Crews in 2014, before Chris Harrison took full hosting responsibilities in Autumn 2015. On 17 May 2019, the American version was cancelled after a total of 17 seasons and 20 years encompassing both primetime and first-run syndication; the final episode of the series was broadcast on 31 May. However, ABC reversed the cancellation of the programme on 8 January 2020, announcing plans for a twenty-first season, consisting of nine episodes, to be presented by Jimmy Kimmel starting 8 April.

=== Russia ===
On 1 October 1999, NTV launched a Russian version the game show, entitled О, счастливчик! ("Oh, how lucky!"). This version ran until its final episode on 28 January 2001, whereupon a few weeks later it was relaunched under the Russian translation of Who Wants to Be a Millionaire?, on Channel One. The relaunched version was hosted by Maxim Galkin until 2008 and Dmitry Dibrov until 2022. As a result of the 2022 Russian invasion of Ukraine, the production of the program was temporarily cancelled. In 2023, the show returned with Yulianna Karaulova as the host with many new changes, and the format's distributor is not involved in the production.

=== India ===
On 3 July 2000, an Indian version of the game show was launched. The show was hosted by Amitabh Bachchan in his first appearance on Indian television, and received additional seasons in 2005–2006, 2007, and then every year since 2010. Subsequent Indian versions were also made. The original Indian version became immortalised in 2008, within the plot of Danny Boyle's award-winning drama film Slumdog Millionaire, adapted from the 2005 Indian novel Q & A by Vikas Swarup.

Language (version)	Title	Date of release
Bengali	Ke Hobe Banglar Kotipoti	4 June 2011
Bhojpuri	Ke Bani Crorepati	30 May 2011
Hindi	Kaun Banega Crorepati	3 July 2000
Kannada	Kannadada Kotyadhipati	12 March 2012
Kashmiri	Kus Bani Koshur Karorpaet	29 April 2019
Malayalam	Ningalkkum Aakaam Kodeeshwaran	9 April 2012
Marathi	Kon Hoeel Marathi Crorepati	6 May 2013
Marathi	Kon Honar Crorepati	27 May 2019
Tamil	Neengalum Vellalaam Oru Kodi	27 February 2012
Tamil	Kodeeswari	23 December 2019
Telugu	Meelo Evaru Koteeswarudu	9 June 2014
Telugu	Evaru Meelo Koteeswarulu	22 August 2021

=== Sri Lanka ===
On 18 September 2010, a Sinhalese version called Obada lakshapathi mamada lakshapathi (ඔබද ලක්ෂපති මමද ලක්ෂපති) was launched by Sirasa TV of the Capital Maharaja Television Network. It is presented by Chandana Suriyabandara, a senior commentator in Sri Lanka. It offers 2 million Sri Lankan rupees as the ultimate prize. On its 10th anniversary, it was rebranded as Sirasa Lakshapathi (සිරස ලක්ෂපති) and the prize was changed to Rs. 3 Million.

In May 2011 a Tamil version called Ungalil Yaar Maha Latchathipathi (உங்களில் யார் மகா இலட்சாதிபதி) was launched by Shakthi TV. The show is hosted by Abarna Suthan and Balendran Kandeeban. The top prize is 2 million rupees.

=== Philippines ===
In 2000, a Filipino version of the game show was launched by the government-sequestered Intercontinental Broadcasting Corporation. Hosted by Christopher de Leon and produced by Viva Television, it ran for two years before being axed. On 23 May 2009, the show was relaunched on TV5 with Vic Sotto as the new host. The relaunched version was aired until 7 October 2012, when it was replaced by the Philippine version of The Million Pound Drop Live, but it returned the following year on 15 September 2013, following the success of Talentadong Pinoy that year. It finally concluded on 22 November 2015.

=== Italy ===
Chi vuol essere miliardario? was first launched by Endemol on Canale 5 in 2000. In 2002, its name was changed from Chi vuol essere milionario? after the Italian lira was replaced with the euro. Fremantle Italia's unit Wavy produced a new season with four special episodes for its 20th anniversary in 2018, followed by another eight special episodes in 2019. The host was Gerry Scotti for every edition from 2000 to 2011 and from 2018 onward.

=== Nepal ===
Ko Banchha Crorepati (को बन्छ करोडपति; also simply known as KBC Nepal) first premiered on 2 February 2019 on AP1 Television, scheduled to run for 52 episodes. It is hosted by Rajesh Hamal and produced by SRBN Media Pvt. Ltd. Contestants can win cash prizes up to 1 crore (10 million) Nepalese rupees.

=== Costa Rica ===
¿Quién quiere ser millonario? is the Costa Rican version, hosted by Édgar Silva Loáiciga. There are three lifelines – "50:50", "People Speak" and "Switch". The show was broadcast from 3 February 2009 to 3 September 2013 and from 27 April 2021 onwards. It is shown on the private TV station Teletica. If a contestant gets the fifth question correct, they leave with at least 600,000 Costa Rican colón. If a contestant gets the tenth question correct, they leave with at least ₡3,500,000. Three contestants have won the top prize.

=== Vietnam ===
Ai là Triệu Phú is the Vietnamese version, currently hosted by Nguyễn Quốc Khánh since 2026 (formerly Lai Van Sam from 2005 to 2017, Phan Đăng from 2018 to 2020 and Đinh Tiến Dũng from 2021 to 2025). The show was broadcast from 4 January 2005 to 31 August 2010 and from 5 July 2011 onwards. It is broadcast on VTV3, which was the entertainment channel of Vietnam Television. Contestants can win cash prizes up to 500,000,000₫.

The show switched to the Hot Seat version called Ai Là Triệu Phú - Ghế Nóng based on the original Australian format from 7 September 2010 to 28 June 2011. Taking audience's feedback into consideration that the original format is more liked and familiar, the show producers decided to convert back to the old format which returned on 5 July 2011.

The series produced no top prize winners, but Nguyễn Trường Giang were the only contestant that won the biggest prize 150,000,000₫. As the show celebrated its 20th anniversary in 2025, it was the longest and so far, being the only Southeast Asian version of Millionaire that still broadcast as of now.

Before Ai Là Triệu Phú premiered, a predecessor similar show entitled Rồng Vàng, which was the unlicensed version of Who Wants to Be a Millionaire? based on the Thai version was broadcast on HTV7 (Ho Chi Minh City Television) starting from 23 May 2003 to 10 June 2007 and it became popular until around 2005, when Ai Là Triệu Phú premiered.

=== Other versions ===
Other notable versions created in other countries, include the following:

- In 1999, a Dutch version of the game show called Lotto Weekend Miljonairs, was launched on SBS 6. It was hosted by Robert ten Brink. In 2006, the show was moved to RTL 4 until it was cancelled in 2008. The show was later revived on SBS 6 in 2011 with Jeroen van der Boom as the host. In 2019, the show was relaunched on RTL 4 with a new name: Bankgiro Miljonairs, hosted again by Robert ten Brink. Until August 28, 2021, a new name is Vriendenloterij Milijonairs.
- On 3 September 1999, a German version was launched by RTL Television, with Günther Jauch as the host. From 28 January 2001 to 22 April 2001, RTL Zwei showed a copy called Multi Millionär moderated by Phil Daub.
- The Polish version is called Milionerzy (lit. 'Millionaires') and is aired on TVN between years 1999–2003, 2008–2010 and 2017 - 2025 and then on Polsat since autumn 2025.
- On 12 November 1999, a Finnish version of the show called Haluatko miljonääriksi? (lit. 'Do You Want to Be a Millionaire?'), was launched on Nelonen, hosted by Lasse Lehtinen. In 2005 the show was moved to MTV3, hosted by Ville Klinga, until it was cancelled in 2007. After almost ten years, the show relaunched on Nelonen in 2016, hosted by Jaajo Linnonmaa. There was a small break in 2021, but in 2022 the show was back on with a new host, Antti Holma.
- In 2000, the Hungarian version of the show, Legyen Ön is milliomos! was launched on RTL. Its iconic host was István Vágó for 1,098 episodes, mainly weeknights, until 2008. It aired again in 2009, led by the famous stand-up comedian Sándor Fábry, fired after 6 normal and 3 Hot Seat shows, then in 2012–2013 by Sándor Friderikusz, two times a week. In 2019, the show relaunched again on TV2, hosted by experienced quizshow leader Gábor Gundel-Takács. Nevertheless, the revival aired only 42 times, thus it went off weeknights, which led to a radical decline from the start of 5% SHR in ratings. The host told the audience in a Facebook video that the show would have been needed to air earlier than 21:20 (CET) to avoid timeshift changes due to the popular reality show Exatlon Hungary. In 2024 the show relaunched with László Palik as host.
- The unlicensed Taiwanese version of the show, 超級大富翁 (Chao Ji Da Fu Weng), was hosted by Hsieh Chen-wu, and ran until 2006. Unlike other versions, the Taiwanese version saw major differences: the contestant may not have walked away at any level, and there were no milestone levels; if the contestant missed a question, any winnings won up to that point were incorrect was cut by half. As the show was live broadcast, the "Ask the Audience" lifeline relied on the viewers across Taiwan. This was also one of the earliest versions to adopt the clock format, which would later be adopted in the American version starting in the 2009 season.
- On 20 April 2000, a Japanese version called Quiz $ Millionaire was launched by Fuji Television. Hosted by Monta Mino, it ran as a weekly programme for seven years, after which it aired as occasional specials; the final episode aired on 2 January 2013. The show relaunched in 2026 with Kazunari Ninomiya as host.
- On 3 July 2000, a French version, Qui veut gagner des millions ?, was launched on the TF1 network, hosted by Jean-Pierre Foucault, from 26 January 2019 to 1 August 2020 by Camille Combal and on 20 and 27 September 2024 by Arthur. In 2020, due to the COVID-19 pandemic, a special "At Home" edition was introduced in order to comply with the national lockdown. Celebrities competed from home in order to win money for charity. The show was filmed from the host's house in the first episodes and saw the introduction of a new lifeline to replace "Ask the Audience", "l'Appel à la maison" ("Phone Home") which allowed the contestants to call a viewer of the show at home.
- On 13–14 September 2000, a Canadian version called Who Wants to Be a Millionaire: Canadian Edition was broadcast in Canada on CTV. It was hosted by newscaster Pamela Wallin.
- On 15 September 2000, a Slovak version of the game show, entitled Milionár, was launched on Markíza. It was hosted by Martin Nikodým. In 2007, the show was moved to Jednotka until it was cancelled in 2008.
- On 16 October 2000, a Czech version of the game show, Chcete být milionářem?, was launched on TV Nova, hosted by Vladimír Čech. The first million-winner was Zdeněk Jánský in 2002. Vladimír Čech was removed from the show and was replaced by Martin Preiss in 2003, who hosted for a year. In 2005, he was replaced by Czech musician Ondřej Hejma, who hosted the very last episodes of the original programme. In June 2005, the show on TV Nova was cancelled. In February 2008 was the show launched on FTV Prima as a syndicated version – on daily evening before the main TV News at 19:30. The show was entitled Milionář and hosted by Roman Šmucler. The show was cancelled in the same year. In 2016, TV Nova returned the show with the original name Chcete být milionářem? For now, the show was hosted by the Czech actor Marek Vašut, but it ran for only one season before it was cancelled. The main prize of Chcete být milionářem? was 10 million Czech crowns; in Milionář it was 2 million crowns.
- On October 17, 2000, an Irish version of the game began airing on RTÉ One. It ran until 29 March 2002, and was hosted by the long-time talk show host Gay Byrne.
- In 2001, a Hong Kong version called Baak Maan Fu Yung was launched by Asia Television. It ran until 2005 and 2018, and was hosted by actor Kenneth Chan and Stephen Chan.
- Singapore hosted its own version of Who Wants to Be a Millionaire? in both English and Chinese versions dubbed Bai wan da ying jia, which ran from 2000 until 2004. It was hosted by Mark van Cuylenberg, known by the stage name of "The Flying Dutchman" in the English version, and Taiwanese actor Timothy Chao in the Chinese version. The series produced no top prize winners on either versions, but one contestant, Steven Tan, won $250,000 on 27 December 2001, and Tan remained as the biggest cash winner in Singaporean game show history since.
- In 2007, a Chinese version was launched, hosted by Lǐ Fán. It ran until April 2008.
- On 6 May 2017, a Brazilian version entitled Quem quer ser um milionário, which is a segment of the variety show Domingão com Huck, premiered on Rede Globo. A similar show entitled Show do Milhão, hosted by Silvio Santos, aired on SBT between 1999 and 2003 with a further revival in 2009, 2021 (the latter with the sponsorship of the Brazilian fintech application PicPay and hosted by Celso Portiolli) and 2024 (hosted by Patricia Abravanel as a segment of the variety show Programa Silvio Santos).
- On 11 August 2018, a Mauritian version was launched on MBC 1 by the Mauritius Broadcasting Corporation. The show is presented by Sandra Mayotte, the 14th female host in the Millionaire franchise.
- Стани Богат (lit. 'Become rich') is the Bulgarian version of Who Wants to Be a Millionaire?. It first aired on NOVA, later on BNT 1 and finally on BTV.
- څوك غواري چې شي میلیونر؟ (in Pashto, English translation: Who will be the millionaire?, transliteration: Suok Ghwari Chi Shi Millonar?, or کی ميخواهد میلیونر شود؟ (in Persian, transliteration: Ki Mekhaahad Milyunar Shawad?), is an Afghan version that ran from 2008 to 2011.

== Hallmarks ==
=== Music ===
The musical score most commonly associated with the franchise was composed by father-and-son duo Keith and Matthew Strachan. The Strachans' score provides drama and tension, and unlike older game show musical scores, Millionaire's musical score was created to feature music playing almost throughout the entire show. The Strachans' main Millionaire theme song takes inspiration from the "Mars" movement of Gustav Holst's The Planets, and their cues from the 6th/3rd to 10th/7th question, and then from the 11th/8th question onwards, take the pitch up a semitone for each subsequent question, in order to increase tension as the contestant progressed through the game. On Game Show Network (GSN)'s Gameshow Hall of Fame special, the narrator described the Strachan tracks as "mimicking the sound of a beating heart", and stated that as the contestant works their way up the money ladder, the music is "perfectly in tune with their ever-increasing pulse".

The Strachans' Millionaire soundtrack was honoured by the American Society of Composers, Authors and Publishers with numerous awards, the earliest of them awarded in 2000. A British album of the musical stings was released in 2000, while a remix of the theme tune became a UK chart hit the same year. The original music cues were given minor rearrangements for the American version's clock format in 2008; for example, the question cues were synced to the "ticking" sounds of the game clock. Even later, the Strachan score was removed from the American version altogether for the introduction of the "shuffle format" in 2010, in favour of a new musical score with cues written by Jeff Lippencott and Mark T. Williams, co-founders of the Los Angeles-based company Ah2 Music. But the revival season on 2020 in US saw the Strachan music return.

==== Soundtrack variants ====
In 2007, the British version underwent a major change in identification, most notably the soundtrack was changed from the classic version to a rave remix. These parts of the soundtrack were composed and remixed by Ramon Covalo and Nick Magnus respectively. This score would go on to be used by most international versions of the franchise, though some of the countries have used partly of these soundtracks, and still used Keith & Matthew Strachan soundtracks for the rest of the cues.. However, the 2018 UK revival saw the Strachans' original score reinstated.

==== India version ====
In the Indian version, the show theme songs and background music were composed, composed and arranged by musician Sawan Dutta starting from season 5 in 2011. Since 2019, the duo Ajay - Atul are the new musicians who compose and arrange the theme songs for the show, starting from season 15, the rules of the game changed a bit, the main host Amitabh Bachchan and Rohan-Vinayak also participated in the process of arranging the theme songs for the show, some later Indian versions also used these themes.

=== Set ===
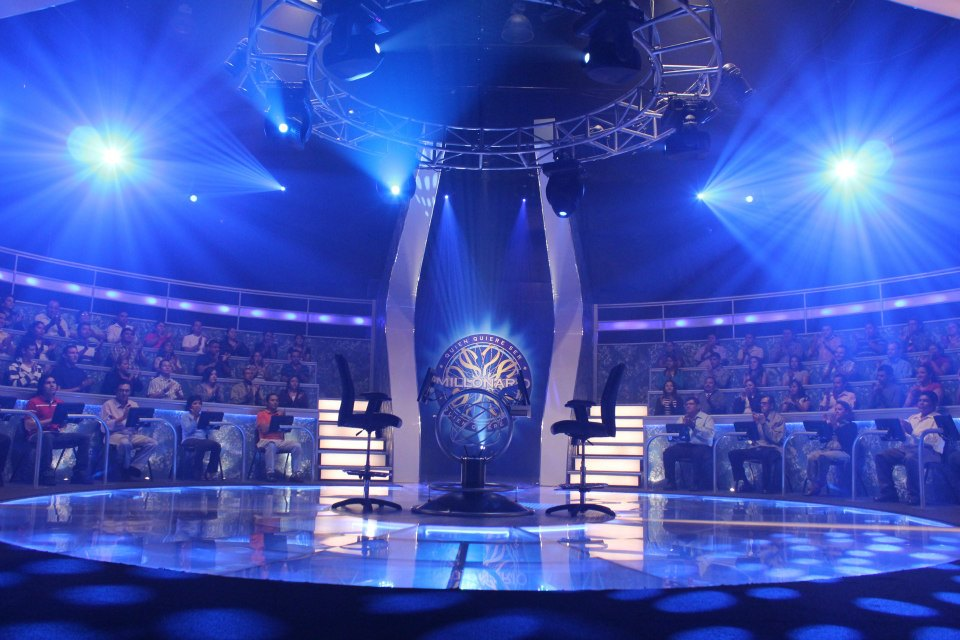
TV studio of ¿Quién quiere ser millonario?, the Salvadorian version of the show.

The basic set design used in the Millionaire franchise was conceived by British production designer Andy Walmsley, and is the most reproduced scenic design in television history. Unlike older game shows whose sets are or were designed to make the contestant(s) feel at ease, Millionaire's set was designed to make the contestant feel uncomfortable, so that the programme feels more like a thriller movie than a typical quiz show. The floor is made of Plexiglas beneath which lies a huge dish covered in mirror paper. The main game typically has the contestant and host sit in "Hot Seats", which are slightly modified, 3 foot (0.91 m)-high Pietranera Arco All chairs situated in the centre of the stage; an LG computer monitor directly facing each seat displays questions and other pertinent information.

The lighting system is programmed to darken the set as the contestant progresses further into the game. There are also spotlights situated at the bottom of the set area that zoom down on the contestant when they answer a major question; to increase the visibility of the light beams emitted by such spotlights, oil is vaporised, creating a haze effect. Media scholar Dr. Robert Thompson, a professor at Syracuse University, stated that the show's lighting system made the contestant feel as though they were outside a prison while an escape was in progress.

When the US Millionaire introduced its "shuffle format", the Hot Seats and corresponding monitors were replaced with a single podium and as a result, the contestant and host stand throughout the game and are also able to walk around the stage. According to Vieira, the Hot Seat was removed because it was decided that the seat, which was originally intended to make the contestant feel nervous, actually ended up having contestants feel so comfortable in it that it did not service the production team any longer. Also, two video screens were installed – one that displays the current question in play, and another that displays the contestant's cumulative total and progress during the game. In September 2012, the redesigned set was improved with a modernised look and feel, in order to take into account the show's transition to high-definition broadcasting, which had just come about the previous year. The two video screens were replaced with two larger ones, having twice as many projectors as the previous screens; the previous contestant podium was replaced with a new one; and light-emitting diode (LED) technology was integrated into the lighting system to give the lights more vivid colours and the set and gameplay experience a more intimate feel.

=== Catchphrase ===
Millionaire has made catchphrases out of several lines used on the show. The most well-known of these catchphrases is the host's question "Is that your final answer?", asked whenever a contestant's answer needs to be verified. The question is asked because the nature of the game allows contestants to ponder the options aloud before committing to an answer. Regularly on tier-three questions (and sometimes on tier-two), a dramatic pause occurs between the contestant's statement of their final answer and the host's acknowledgement of whether or not it is correct.

Many parodies of Millionaire have capitalised on the "final answer" catchphrase. In the United States, the phrase was popularised by Philbin during his tenure as the host of that country's version, to the extent that TV Land listed it in its special 100 Greatest TV Quotes and Catchphrases, which aired in 2006.

On the Australian versions, McGuire replaces the phrase with "Lock it in?"; likewise, the hosts of the Indian version have used varying "lock" catchphrases. There are also a number of other non-English versions of Millionaire where the host does not ask "[Is that your] final answer?" or a literal translation thereof. Besides the "final answer" question, other catchphrases used on the show include the contestants' requests to use lifelines, such as "I'd like to phone a friend"; and a line that Tarrant spoke whenever a contestant was struggling with a particular question, "Some questions are only easy if you know the answer." Another popular catchphrase heard throughout the show is spoke by Tarrant to encourage the player when he hands over the cheque, "But we don't want to give you that!"

== Reception ==
Who Wants to Be a Millionaire? has been credited with single-handedly reviving interest in, and breaking new ground for, the television game show. It revolutionised the look and feel of game shows with its unique lighting system, dramatic music cues, and futuristic set. The show also became one of the best selling TV formats in television history, and is credited by some as paving the way for the boom in the popularity of reality television.

=== Awards, accolades and honours ===
In 2000, the British Film Institute honoured the UK version of Millionaire by ranking it number 23 on its "BFI TV 100" list, which compiled what British television industry professionals believed were the greatest programmes to have ever originated from that country. The UK Millionaire also won the 1999 British Academy Television Award for Best Entertainment Programme, and seven National Television Awards for Most Popular Quiz Programme from 1999 to 2005.

The original primetime version of the US Millionaire won two Daytime Emmy Awards for Outstanding Game/Audience Participation Show in 2000 and 2001. Philbin was honoured with a Daytime Emmy in the category of Outstanding Game Show Host in 2001, while Vieira received one in 2005 and another in 2009, making her the second woman to win an Emmy Award for hosting a game show, and the first to win multiple times. TV Guide ranked the US Millionaire No. 7 on its 2001 list of the 50 Greatest Game Shows of All Time, and later ranked it No. 6 on its 2013 "60 Greatest Game Shows" list. GSN ranked Millionaire No. 5 on its August 2006 list of the 50 Greatest Game Shows of All Time, and later honoured the show in January 2007 on its first, and so far only, Gameshow Hall of Fame special.

== Charles Ingram cheating scandal ==
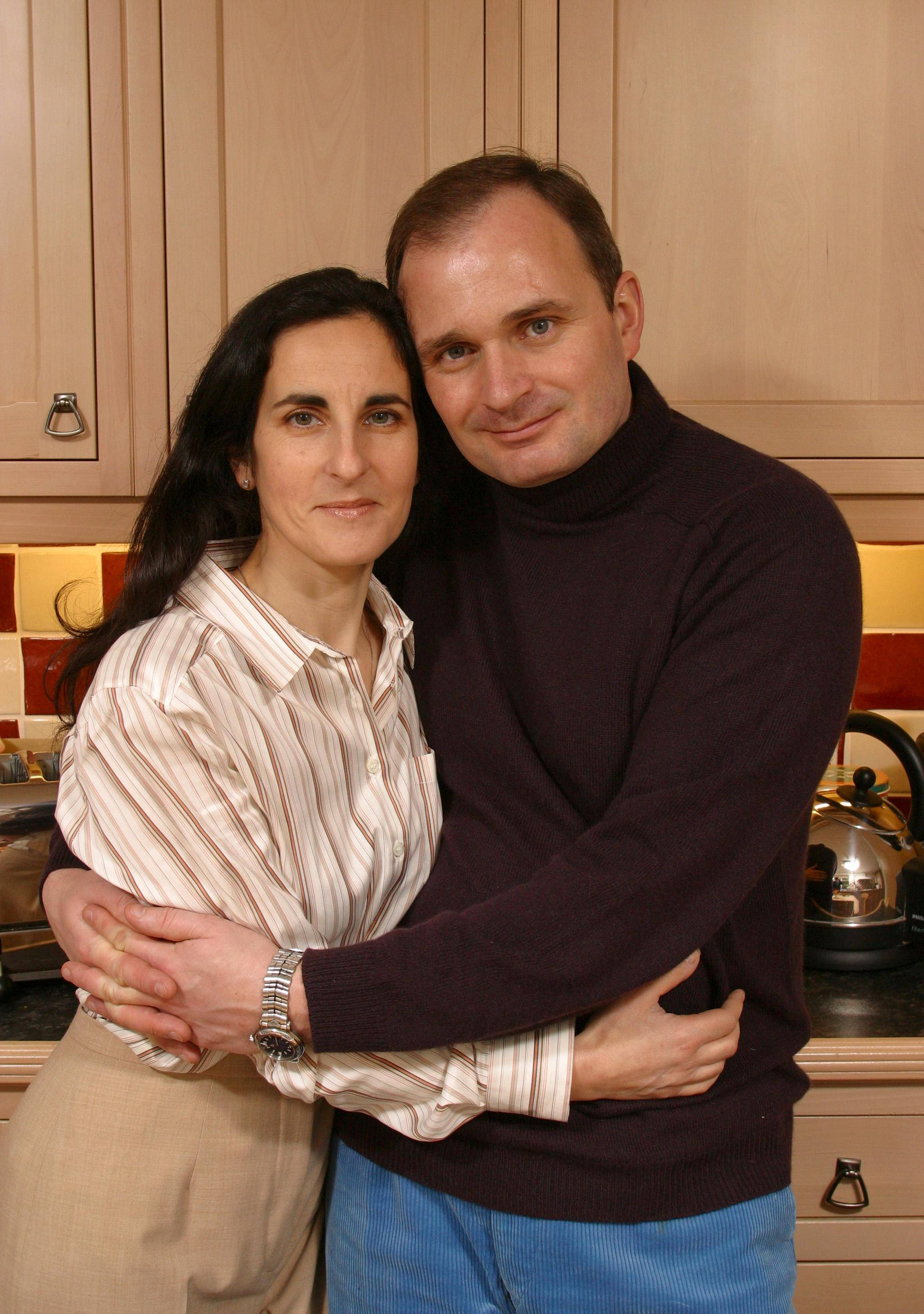
Charles and Diana Ingram

In September 2001, British Army Major Charles Ingram apparently won the top prize in the UK Millionaire, but his flip-flopping on each of the final two questions raised suspicion of cheating. When the footage was reviewed, staff made a connection between Fastest Finger contestant Tecwen Whittock's coughing and Ingram's answers. The prize was withheld, and police were called in to investigate the matter further.

In March 2003, the Ingrams and Whittock were taken to court on the charge of using fraudulent means to win the top prize on Who Wants to Be a Millionaire?. During the trial, the defence claimed that Whittock had simply suffered from allergies during recording of the second episode, but the prosecution noted that his coughing stopped upon Ingram leaving the set and Whittock subsequently taking his turn on the main game. The trial concluded with all three being found guilty and receiving suspended sentences. After the trial, ITV aired a documentary about the scandal, along with Ingram's entire game, with coughing sounds amplified. As a joke, Benylin paid to have the first commercial shown during the programme's commercial break.

In April 2020, ITV aired a three part drama titled Quiz based upon the scandal.

== Other media ==
=== Merchandise ===
Three board game adaptations of the UK Millionaire were released by Upstarts in 1998, and a junior edition recommended for younger players was introduced in 2001. The American version also saw two board games of its own, released by Pressman Toy Corporation in 2000. Other Millionaire board games have included a game based on the Australian version's Hot Seat format, which was released by UGames; a game based on the Italian version released by Hasbro; and a game based on the French version which was released by TF1's games division.

An electronic tabletop version of the game was released by Tiger Electronics in 2000. Six different DVD games based on the UK Millionaire, featuring Tarrant's likeness and voice, were released by Zoo Digital Publishing and Universal Studios Home Entertainment between 2002 and 2008. In 2008, Imagination Games released a DVD game based on the US version, based on the 2004–2008 format and coming complete with Vieira's likeness and voice, as well as a quiz book and a 2009 desktop calendar.

=== Video game adaptations ===
The UK Millionaire saw five video game adaptations for personal computers and Sony's PlayStation and Sega's Dreamcast consoles, as well as Nintendo's Game Boy Advance, produced by Hothouse Creations and Eidos Interactive.

Between 1999 and 2001, Jellyvision (the predecessor to Jackbox Games) produced five games based on the US network version for PCs and the PlayStation, all of them featuring Philbin's likeness and voice. The first of these adaptations – Who Wants to Be a Millionaire – was published by Disney Interactive, while the later four were published by Buena Vista Interactive which had just been spun off from DI when it reestablished itself in attempts to diversify its portfolio. Of the five games, three featured general trivia questions, one was sports-themed, and another was a "Kids Edition" featuring easier questions. Eurocom ported the game to the Game Boy Color for the second edition.

Two additional US Millionaire games were released by Ludia in conjunction with Ubisoft in 2010 and 2011; the first of these was a game for Nintendo's Wii console and DS handheld system, as well as a PlayStation 3 port of the Wii version, based on the 2008–2010 clock format, with the Wii version offered on the show as a consolation prize to audience contestants during the 2010–2011 season. The second, for Microsoft's Xbox 360, was based on the "shuffle format" and was offered as a consolation prize during the next season (2011–2012).

Ludia also made a Facebook game based on Millionaire available to players in North America from 2011 to 2016. This game featured an altered version of the "shuffle format", condensing the number of questions to twelve – eight in round one and four in round two. Contestants competed against eight other Millionaire fans in round one, with the top three playing round two alone. There was no "final answer" rule; the contestant's responses were automatically locked in. Answering a question correctly earned a contestant the value of that question, multiplied by the number of people who responded incorrectly. Contestants were allowed to use two of their Facebook friends as "Jump the Question" lifelines in round one, and to use the "Ask the Audience" lifeline in round two to invite up to 50 such friends of theirs to answer a question for a portion of the prize money of the current question.

On 29 October 2020, Microids published a video game under the same name and released it on Steam, PlayStation 4, Xbox One and Nintendo Switch.

In 2023, Sony Pictures published a video game for mobile devices, called Millionaire Champions and released it on Android and iOS.

List of Who Wants to Be a Millionaire? video games
Title	Release date(s)	Developer(s)	Publisher(s)	Platform(s)
Who Wants to Be a Millionaire	1999	Jellyvision Games	Disney Interactive	Macintosh, Microsoft Windows
Who Wants to Be a Millionaire - Second Edition	2000	Jellyvision Games	Buena Vista Interactive (PC), Sony Computer Entertainment (PS1), THQ (GBC)	Macintosh, Microsoft Windows, PlayStation, Game Boy Color
Who Wants to Be a Millionaire	September 2000	Hothouse Creations	Eidos Interactive	Dreamcast, Microsoft Windows, PlayStation
Who Wants to Be a Millionaire	2000	Tiger Electronics	Tiger Electronics	Handheld
Who Wants to Be a Millionaire - 3rd Edition	2000/2001	Buena Vista Interactive	Buena Vista Interactive (PC), Sony Computer Entertainment (PS1)	Macintosh, Microsoft Windows, PlayStation
Who Wants to Be a Millionaire: Sports Edition	2000	Buena Vista Interactive	Buena Vista Interactive	Macintosh, Microsoft Windows
Who Wants to Be a Millionaire - 2nd Edition	September 28, 2001	Hothouse Creations	Eidos Interactive	Microsoft Windows, PlayStation
Who Wants to Be a Millionaire - 2nd Edition	November 30, 2001	Revolution Software	Eidos Interactive	PlayStation 2
Who Wants to Be a Millionaire: Junior	2001	Hothouse Creations	Eidos Interactive	Microsoft Windows, PlayStation
Who Wants to Be a Millionaire: Kids Edition	2001	Buena Vista Interactive, ImageBuilder Software	Buena Vista Interactive	Macintosh, Microsoft Windows
Who Wants to Be a Millionaire: Party Edition	2006	Climax Action	Eidos Interactive	Microsoft Windows, PlayStation 2, PlayStation Portable
Who Wants to Be a Millionaire: 1st Edition	November 2, 2007	Slam Productions, Route 1 Games	Ubisoft	Nintendo DS, Wii
Who Wants to Be a Millionaire: 2nd Edition	November 28, 2008	Route 1 Games, Slam Productions	Ubisoft	Nintendo DS, Wii
Who Wants to Be a Millionaire	September 17, 2010	Ludia	Ubisoft	Microsoft Windows, Nintendo DS, PlayStation 3, Wii
Who Wants to Be a Millionaire: 2012 Edition	November 1, 2011	Ludia	Ubisoft	Xbox 360
Who Wants to Be a Millionaire: Special Edition	October 15, 2013	Doublesix Video Games	Koch Media	Microsoft Windows, PlayStation 3, Xbox 360
Who Wants to Be a Millionaire	October 29, 2020	Appeal Studios S.A.	Microids	Blacknut, Microsoft Windows, Nintendo Switch, PlayStation 4, Xbox One, Xbox Series S/X
Who Wants to Be a Millionaire: New Edition	November 30, 2021	Appeal Studios S.A.	Microids	PlayStation 5
Millionaire Champions	December 19, 2023	One More Go Ltd.	Sony Pictures	Android, iOS

=== Scrapped animated spin-off ===
In September 2001, Celador signed a deal with DIC Entertainment to produce a cartoon based on the show titled The Adventures of Who Wants to Be a Millionaire? – The Animated Series, The series was to follow fictional winners of the show, who would have used their prize money to take trips to various exotic locations, while the fictional host would keep in touch with them through the Millionaire Command Center.

The series was planned to be shown off at MIPCOM that year, but nothing else was confirmed for the series, and it was silently scrapped without a formal announcement.

=== Disney Parks attraction ===
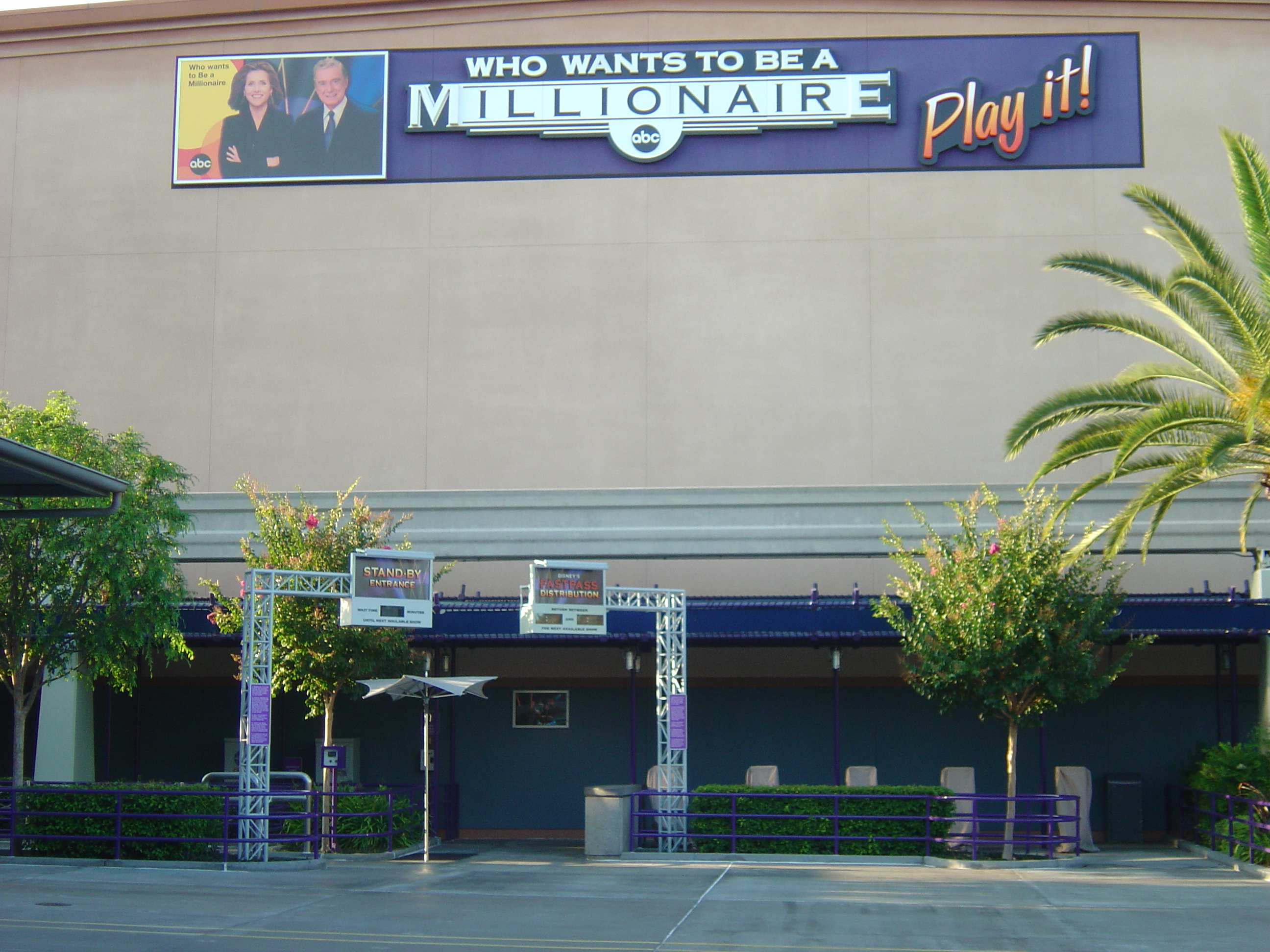
The building housing the California version after its 2004 closure

A theme park attraction based on the show, known as Who Wants to Be a Millionaire – Play It!, appeared at Disney's Hollywood Studios (when it was known as Disney-MGM Studios) at the Walt Disney World Resort in Orlando, Florida and at Disney California Adventure Park in Anaheim, California. Both the Florida and California Play It! attractions opened in 2001; the California version closed in 2004, and the Florida version closed in 2006 and was replaced by Toy Story Midway Mania!

The format in the Play It! attraction was very similar to that of the television show that inspired it. When a show started, a "Fastest Finger" question was given, and the audience was asked to put the four answers in order; the person with the fastest time was the first contestant in the Hot Seat for that show. However, the main game had some differences: for example, contestants competed for points rather than dollars, the questions were set to time limits, and the "Phone a Friend" lifeline became "Phone a Complete Stranger" which connected the contestant to a Disney cast member outside the attraction's theatre who would find a guest to help. After the contestant's game was over, they were awarded anything from a collectible pin, to clothing, to a Millionaire CD game, to a three-night Disney Cruise.

== Spin-off ==
The Italian version worked in 2008 on a spin-off of the game show called 50–50 (Fifty Fifty). Such a spin-off aired in North Macedonia, Nepal, Albania, Kosovo, Spain, Sweden, Greece, Japan, Thailand, Turkey and Egypt.

=== 50–50 ===
50–50
- Original work: 50–50 (Italy)
- Years: 2008 – mid-2010s

Miscellaneous
- Genre: Game show
- First aired: 21 April 2008; 18 years ago
- Distributor: 2waytraffic; Endemol

50–50 was a television game show which offers large cash prizes for correctly answering a series of randomised multiple-choice questions of varying difficulty with two options. The format is a spin-off of the quiz show Who Wants to Be a Millionaire? and was created by Intellygents, 2waytraffic, Endemol and RTI (Reti Televisive Italiane) company of Mediaset, moreover was exported and aired in many countries around the world.

==== Gameplay ====
Unlike the traditional Who Wants to Be a Millionaire?, this game is played by a team of two players.

In some countries (such as Italy), a preliminary game is played. In these rounds, three pairs answer questions worth a specific amount of money (€500 in Italy), and must buzz in. The answer options are revealed only after buzzing in, and each player buzzes in for their partner to answer, rather than themselves. If they get it correct, they bank the money, but if they get it wrong, the money is split "fifty-fifty" between the two opposing pairs. After five minutes, the pair with the most money goes on to the main game, and the pair in second place returns next episode. The money earned would be taken home by the player in first place as additional winnings, therefore acting as a consolation so it was impossible to win €0.

In round 1 of the main game, the playing pair will answer ten questions. Each question is worth a different random amount, and all the money they win goes into their jackpot. If at any point they get an answer wrong, the value of the jackpot is halved. The team plays together but will answer each question separately.

Only one player in the couple (determined at random) sees the question and its two answers. They will have ten seconds to lock in their answer. After the first player selects an answer, the host turns to the second player and shows them the question and the answer that the first player chose. (They are not shown the answer that their partner turned down.) Player 2 must now decide whether to agree with Player 1's answer, or to switch the team's answer to the other answer, whatever it may be. If the question is ultimately answered correctly, the value of the question will be added to the bank. Otherwise, the current value of the bank is halved.

In round 2, the host poses five questions to one player of the team in succession. After playing them, the other player would have only seen one of the two choices. Now the second player will look at all five answers and determine how many questions the first player answered correctly. If the player guesses too few or too many, the winnings are reduced to zero.

In the final round, the host asks five questions to one of the two competitors, this will have 10 seconds to answer each question and her partner will on his electronic screen stand the answer. He or she will decide whether to confirm or choose the option that has not been seen. At the end of the questions the contestant who does not see both answers will have to make a prediction of the number of correct answers given. The total prize money can be won only if the forecast is 5 and proves correct, otherwise the part of the prize money that is won will be proportionately less. If the number of correct answers is guessed, the pair win the prize, otherwise they receive the consolation prize.

==== International versions ====
Country	Name	Host	Channel	Year shown	Prize
Albania; Kosovo	Fifty Fifty	Enkel Demi	RTSH; Klan Kosova	April 14, 2013 – ?	€25,000
Egypt	Fifty Fifty	Ashraf Riad	ERT 1	November 5, 2010 – 2011	ج.م250,000
Greece	Fifty Fifty	Giorgos Liagkas	Mega Channel	2008–2009	€30,000
Italy (original format)	Fifty Fifty	Gerry Scotti	Canale 5	April 21, 2008 – May 25, 2008	€300,000
Japan	クイズ 50-50; Quiz Fifty-Fifty	Toshihiro Itō	BS Fuji	May 7, 2008 – ?	¥3,000,000
Nepal	Fifty Fifty	Madan Krishna Shrestha	NTV	2008	Rs.500,000
North Macedonia	Педесет-Педесет; Pedeset-Pedeset	Predrag Pavlovski; Žarko Dimitrioski	A1	June 30, 2008 – 2009	300,000 ден
Spain	Fifty Fifty	Silvia Jato	Cuatro	July 1, 2008 – September 6, 2008	€50,000
Sweden	Postkodlotteriets 50-50	Sofia Rågenklint	TV4	September 22, 2008 – April 23, 2009	55,000 kr
Thailand	50-50	Ṭhnạth Tạnnuchittikul	TV3	November 2, 2009 – October 12, 2010	5,000 baht
Turkey	Birimiz İkimiz İçin	İlker Aksum	TRT 1	October 10, 2010 – ?	100,000 TL

== See also ==
- List of television game show franchises
