= List of Bulgarian television shows =

== BNT ==
Year	In Bulgarian	In English	About
1960	По света и у нас	In the world and in us	news
1962	Пътуване без паспорт	Traveling without passport	tourist
1962	Лека нощ, деца	Good night, kids	children's show
1963	Семена в браздите	Seeds in the furrows	farming
1963	Хората от кремиковските скели	People from Kremikovsko scaffolding	public
1967	Воин	Warrior	about the life in the Bulgarian army
1968	Панорама	View	public
1969	Бързи, смели, сръчни	Quick, brave, skillful	children's show
1970	Литературни меридиани	literary meridians	library
1970	Поетична тетрадка	poetry notebook	Poem
1972	Събота вечер, неделя обед	Saturday Night Sunday afternoon	entertainment
1973	24 часа	24 hours	politics
1975	ТВ седянка	TV sedianka	for the Bulgarian folklore
1975	Не се сърди, човече!	Do not get mad, man!	for the Bulgarian folklore
1975	Спорт ТОТО	Sport TOTO	gambling
1976	Гледища	Views	about public problems
1977	Светът в действие	World in Action	politics
1977	100 минути на зрителя	100 minutes per viewer	public
1979	Всяка неделя	Every Sunday	television blog
1980	Минута е много	Minute is much	game
1981	Днес	Today	news
1987	Адрес 4000	Address 4000	public
1988	Добро утро	Good morning	television blog
1990	Ку-ку	Ku-ku	comedy show
1991	Като лъвовете	Like lions	children's show
1992	Ах, тези муцини!	All this faces	interview
1992	Улицата	The street	comedy show
1993	Супершоу Невада	Supershow Nevada	TV game
1993	Частен случай	Private case	public
1994	Как ще ги стигнем...	How will we get them ...	show
1994	Риск печели, риск губи	Risk wins, risk losing	TV game
1995	Каналето	Canaletto	comedy show
1995	За животните с любов	Love for the animals	show
1996	Клуб НЛО	Club UFO	comedy show
1997	Вкусно	Tasty	cooking
1997	Фолкмаратон	Folkmaraton	music show
1998	Точно в 7	Exactly 7	television blog
1998	Хъшове	Outcasts	show
1998	Кръгове	Circles	culture
1998	Понеделник 8 1/2	Monday 8 1/2	cinema rubric
1998	24 квадрата	24 squares	cinema rubric
1998	1002 нощи	1002 nights	night blog
1999	Палавници	Little ruffians	children's show
1999	Спукано гърне	Leaky pot	children's show
1999	Кречетало	Clapper	music show
1999	Техно	Techno	music show
1999	Джубокс	Jukebox	music show
1999	Мрежата	The network	computer show
1999	Гласове	Voices	public
1999	Супер мотор спорт	Super sports bike	sport
2000	Чай	Tea	show
2000	Денят започва	The day begins	television blog
2000	Българският топ 100: Форте	Bulgarian Top 100: Forte	music show
2000	Ала-Бала	Ala-Bala	children's show
2000	Мело ТВ мания	Melo TV mania	music show
2001	Приказки за физиката/астрономията	Tales about physics/astronomy	scientific- popular
2002	Памет българска	Bulgarian memory	historical
2002	Полет над нощта	Flight over night	night blog
2002	За НАТО и България	NATO and Bulgaria	public
2002	По-добре късно, отколкото никога	Better late than never	show
2002	Елит	Elite	secular show
2002	Жега	Sweltering heat	youthful show
2002	Формула К	Formula one11	children's show
2002	Парен влак	Steam train	children's show
2002	Всичко е химия	Everything is chemistry	children's show
2002	Латерна магика	Laterna magica	cinema rubric
2002	В кадър	In the frame	cinema rubric
2002	Предаване за кино	Transmission cinema	cinema rubric
2002	Ш-А-Ш	Y-A-Y	comedy show
2002	Едни от нас	One of us	show
2003	Руска рулетка	Russian roulette	TV game
2003	Залоаложи	Bet hello	TV game
2004	„Романи Лумиа“ Светът на Ромите	„Romani Lumina“ World of Roma people	show
2005	Бързо, лесно, вкусно	Fast, easy, tasty	cooking
2007	Шоуто на Канала	The show of the Channel	comedy show
2007	Иде нашенската музика	Our music is coming	music show
2007	Яко	Cool	children's show
2007	Цветно	Colorful	show business
2007	Куизо	Quiz	TV game
2007	Жените	The women	show business
2007	БНТ такси	BNT taxi	show
2008	В неделя с...	In Sunday	show
2011	Без багаж	No baggage	travel show
2013	Най-хубавите години от нашия живот	The best years of our lives	TV competition for decades
2018	Стани богат	Become a Millionaire	TV game
2018	100% будни	100% awake	show
2018	Култура.бг	Culture.bg	show
2018	Спортисимо	Sportissimo	TV game
2019	БНТ на 60	BNT on 60	show
2020	Моят плейлист	My playlist	music show
2020	Последният печели	The latter win	TV game
2020	Събота вечер с БНТ	Saturday night with BNT	show
2021	Музика безкрай	Music infinitude	music show
2023	Това го знам	I know that	TV game

== bTV ==
Year	In Bulgarian	In English	About
2000	Риск печели, риск губи	Risk wins, risk losing	TV game
2000	Хъшове	Outcasts	show
2000	Искрено и лично	Sincerely and personally	show
2000	Бизнесът идва	The business comes	public
2000	Сеизмограф	Seismograph	public
2000	БТВ Новините	bTV news	news
2000	В десетката	In ten	public
2000	Сладко отмъщение	Sweet revenge	hidden camera
2000	Споко	Spoko	youthful show
2000	Шоуто на Слави	Slavi's show	show
2000	Тази сутрин	This morning	television blog
2000	Най-смешните животни и хора на планетата	The funniest animals and humans on the planet	funny show
2000	Глобусът	The Globe	adventure show
2000	Другата България	Other Bulgaria	adventure show
2000	Зона спорт	Zone sport	sportscast
2000	БТВ репортерите	bTV reporters	public
2000	Иначе	An otherwise	show
2000	Огледала	Mirrors	fashion show
2000	Живот на скорост	Life on speed	automobile broadcast
2001	Кой е по-по-най	Who is a more the most	children's show
2001	Кльомба.знам	@.I know	children's show
2001	Бъдете здрави	Be healthy	health
2001	Бон Апети	Boun Apeti	cooking
2001	Сблъсък	A clash	show
2002	Море от любов	Sea of love	love show
2002	Треска за злато	Gold rush	TV game
2002	Физиотоника	Physiotonick	show
2003	Без думи	Without words	hidden camera
2003	Българският топ 100	Bulgarian Top 100	music show
2004	Изпитът	The exam	TV game
2004	Вот на доверие	Vote of confidence	TV game
2004	Бързи пари	Fast money	TV game
2005	5 старс	5 stars	music show
2005	Кабината	The cabin	show
2005	Горчиво	Bitterly	TV game
2005	Това е мое	This is mine	TV game
2005	Аламинут	Alaminut	comedy show
2005	Смях в залата	Laughter in the hall	comedy show
2005	Туистър	Twister	show
2005	Бригада наш дом	Brigade our home	show
2005	10-те най-...	10 at	TV chart
2006	Такъв е животът	That's life	documentary
2006	БТВ светът	bTV world	news
2006	Световните рекорди Гинес	Guinness World Records	TV records
2006	Шоурум	Showroom	automobile broadcast
2006	Пирамида	Pyramid	public
2006	Реално	Realistically	public
2007	Комиците и приятели	Comedians and friends	comedy show
2007	БТВ документите	bTV documents	public
2007	Часът на мама	The hour of mum	show business
2007	Това го знае всяко хлапе	It knows every kid	TV game
2008	Търси се...	Searching for...	show
2008	Без дрехи	Without clothes	erotic hidden camera
2008	Отпечатъци	Footprints	public
2009	Операция Слава	Operation Glory	show
2009	Нека говорят	Let's talk	show
2009	Любовни игри	Love games	TV game
2009	Кухнята на Звездев	The kitchen of Zvezdev	cooking
2009	Денят е прекрасен	The day is wonderful	show business
2009	Модерно	Modern	fashion show
2009	Непознатите	Strangers	documentary
2009	Господари на Ефира	Lords of the Air	funny show
2009	Пълна лудница	Complete madhouse	comedy show
2010	В джаза събота вечер	In jazz Saturday night	music show
2010	Тази неделя	This Sunday	television blog
2011	Тази събота	This Sathurday	television blog
2011	Преди обед	Before noon	show business
2011	Високи токчета	High heels	show
2012	Духът на здравето	Spirit of Health	health
2012	Предай нататък	Pay it forward	charity show
2012	Лице в лице	Face to face	public
2013	Култ	Cool...T	secular show
2013	Голата истина	The naked truth	show
2013	120 минути	120 minutes	show
2013	Нищо лично	Nothing personal	funny show
2013	Това е цената	This is the price	TV game
2014	АгроФорум	Agroforum	agricultural
2014	Наистина любов	Love actually	love show
2014	Папараци	Paparazzi	secular show
2014	Истински истории	Real stories	documentary reality
2015	Бинго милиони/Лотария България	Bingo millions/Lottery Bulgaria	TV lottery
2015	Мармалад	Fruit jelly	funny show
2015	Бездомното шоу на Башар Рахал	Homeless show of Bashar Rahal	show
2016	Българи на три морета	Bulgarians on three seas	tourism reality
2016	Мама готви по-добре	Mom cook better	TV game
2016	Бригада нов дом	Brigade new home	show
2016	Карбовски втори план	Karbovski second action plan	public
2016	Обичам те! Благодаря ти! Извинявай!	I love you! Thank you! Sorry!	charity show
2016	Ауто Мотор Шоу	Auto Motor Show	automobile broadcast
2016	Спорт Тото	Sport Toto	gambling
2016	Ловци на храна с Андре Токев	Hunters food with Andre Tokev	adventure culinary show
2017	Късното шоу на bTV	Late show of bTV	show
2017	Богатствата на България	The riches of Bulgaria	adventure documentary show
2019	Игрите на звездите	The games of stars	funny show
2020	Шоуто на Николаос Цитиридис	Nikolaos Tsitridis's show	show
2020	Неразказано в историята	Untold in history	documentary
2021	Стани богат	Become a Millionaire	TV game
2022	Без багаж	No baggage	travel show
2022	Защо, господин министър?	Why, Mr. Minister?	public
2022	Дъ Шоуто	The show	show
2022	Животът по действителен случай	Life on a real case	show
2022	Светът на здравето	The world of health	health

== Nova TV ==
Year	In Bulgarian	In English	About
1994	В сърцето на София	In the heart of Sofia	public
1994	Малки обяви	Small classifieds	advertising-information
1995	Данс дъга	Dance rainbow	dance show
1995	Спортувайте с нас	Exercise with us	sport show
1995	От игла до конец	From needle to thread	fashion show
1995	Кинохит	Cinemahit	cinema show
1995	В полите на Витоша	At the foot of Vitosha	culture
1995	Топ фолк	Top folk	music show
1995	Спортен свят	Sport world	sportscast
1995	Софийски приказки	Sofia fairytales	culture
1995	Тя	She	show
1995	Туристически предизвикателства	Tourism challenges	adventure show
1995	Кулинарна мозайка	Culinary mosaic	cooking
1995	Софийски потайности	Sofia's secrets	show
1995	Лабиринт	Labyrinth	public
1995	Музикален свят	Music world	music show
1995	Компютърни мечти	Computer dreams	computer show
1995	Новините на Нова	The news of Nova	news
1996	Любимци	Pets	show
1996	Сол ключ	G-clef	music show
1996	Как си ти	How are you	music show
1997	Иконостас	Ikonostas	religion
1997	Почна се	Began to	television blog
2000	На четири очи	In four eyes	public
2000	Шоу Такси	Show taxi	TV game
2000	Здравей, България	Hello, Bulgaria	television blog
2000	На кафе	On coffee (Na Kafe)	show business
2000	У нас	In our	show business
2001	Стани богат	Become a Millionaire	TV game
2002	Столът	The chair	TV game
2002	Семейни войни	Family Feud	TV game
2003	Разследване	Investigation	public
2003	Господари на Ефира	Lords of the Air	funny show
2003	Голите ангели	Naked angels	erotic
2004	Кречетало	Clapper	music show
2004	Животните представят	The animals present	show
2004	60 минути с Милен Цветков	60 minutes with Milen Tsvetkov	public
2004	Горещо	Hot	secular show
2004	Улицата	The street	comedy show
2005	Имаш поща	You've got mail	show
2005	Часът на Милен Цветков	The hour of Milen Tsvetkov	public
2005	Сделка или не	Deal or no deal	TV game
2006	Отечествен фронт	Fatherland front	public
2007	Един срещу всички	One against all	TV game
2007	Караоке в Събота вечер	Karaoke on Saturday night	music show
2008	Дупка в стената	Hole in the wall	funny show
2008	Царете на комедията	Kings of comedy	comedy show
2009	Пълна лудница	Complete madhouse	comedy show
2009	Шоуто на Иван и Андрей	Ivan and Andrey` show	TV show
2009	Станция Нова	Station Nova	show
2010	Колелото на късмета	The wheel of fortune	TV game
2010	Карбовски директно	Karbovski directly	show
2010	Съдебен спор	Litigation	court show
2011	Аз обичам България	I love Bulgaria	TV game
2011	Черешката на тортата	The cherry of the cake	show
2011	Бон Апети	Boun Apeti	cooking
2012	Всяка неделя	Every Sunday	television blog
2012	Национална лотария	National lottery	TV lottery
2012	Събуди се	Wake up	television blog
2013	ДикOFF	DikOFF	television blog
2013	На светло с Люба Кулезич	Light with Luba Kulezich	television blog
2013	Съдби на кръстопът	Destinies at a crossroad	documentary reality
2014	Ничия земя	No man's land	documentary
2014	Извън новините	Outside the news	show
2014	Кошмари в кухнята	Nightmares at the kitchen	show
2015	Комбина	Combine	television blog
2016	Между нас казано	Between you and me	show
2019	Неделята на Нова	Sunday of Nova	television blog
2020	Карай направо	Drive straight	show
2020	Сладко отмъщение	Sweet revenge	hidden camera
2021	Забраненото шоу на Рачков	Rachkov's forbidden show	TV show
2021	Да хванеш гората	To catch the forest	documentary
2021	На фокус с Лора Крумова	On focus with Lora Krumova	television blog
2022	Голямото преследване	The Chase	TV game
2022	С Рачков всичко е възможно	With Rachkov anything is possible	TV show

== Skat TV ==
Year	In Bulgarian	In English	About
1993	Ако зажалиш	If you are sad for	traditional old time music
1999	Час по България	An hour in Bulgaria	historical
2005	Здравословно	Healthy	health

== Bulgaria on air ==
Year	In Bulgarian	In English	About
2015	Операция история	Operation history	documentary

== TV2 ==
Year	In Bulgarian	In English	About
2007	Вечерното шоу на Азис	Azis` night show	TV show

== 7/8 TV ==
Year	In Bulgarian	In English	About
2020	Крум Савов Live	Krum Savov Live	talk-show with host Krum Savov
2019	Студио Хъ	Studio X	a daily commentary and journalistic program
2019	Вечерното шоу на Слави Трифонов	The evening show of Slavi Trofonov	a late-night show
2019	Шоуто на сценаристите	The show of the screenwriters	informational-satirical show
2020	Tonight с Шкмбата	Tonight with Shkumbata	humorous show with host Dimitar Tudzharov - Shkumbata
2019	Вечерта на Иван Кулеков	Ivan Kulekov's Evening	a journalistic program of Ivan Kulekov
2019	Вечерта на Ку-Ку бенд	Ku-ku Band's Evening	a music show
2019	Вечерта на ...	Evening of ...	Meetings with celebrities and questions from viewers
2019	Вечерта на Северозапада	Evening of the Northwest	a comedy show, with specific humor from the Bulgarian region Northwest
2019	Времето с Иван Атанасов - Ванката	Weather with Ivan Atanasov	meteorological forecast
2021	4+	4+	female show
