= Who Is the Millionaire =

TV game show program

- Titlecard
- Vietnamese: Ai là triệu phú
- Genre: Game show
- Created by: David Briggs; Steven Knight; Mike Whitehill
- Presented by: Lại Văn Sâm (2005–2017); Phan Đăng (2018–2020); Đinh Tiến Dũng (2021–2025); Nguyễn Quốc Khánh (2026–present)
- Composers: Keith Strachan; Matthew Strachan; Nick Magnus
- Country of origin: Vietnam
- Original language: Vietnamese
- No. of episodes: 1024

Production
- Running time: 45 - 60 minutes
- Production companies: Vietnam Television (2005–present); Mesa (previously as E-Media) (2005–2008); Celador (2005–2007); 2waytraffic (2008–2020); Sony Pictures Television (2020–present); CPT Holding, Inc. (2026-present)

Original release
- Network: VTV3
- Release: January 4, 2005 – present

Fragment of the show; contestant and money tree (current version)

Ai là triệu phú (lit. 'Who Is the Millionaire') is a Vietnamese game show based on the original British format of Who Wants to Be a Millionaire?. The producers of the show are Sony Pictures Television and Vietnam Television Digital Center. Ai là triệu phú? began broadcasting on 4 January 2005.

It is currently broadcast on VTV3 on every Tuesday at 21:00 (UTC+7).

== Rules ==
=== Main game ===
The main goal of the game is to win the top prize (currently 500,000,000₫ from 2026) by answering 15 multiple-choice questions correctly.

=== Lifelines ===
There are four lifelines – 50:50, Phone a Friend, Plus One (replaced Ask the Audience in 2020) and Two Wise Men (can be used after the fifth question, replaced Ask Three of the Audience in 2020).

== Ai là triệu phú - Ghế nóng ==
On 7 September 2010, an alternative version for regular Ai là triệu phú was aired, named Ai là triệu phú - Ghế nóng (lit. 'Who Is the Millionaire - Hot Seat'). This is a Vietnamese adaptation of the Australian game show Millionaire Hot Seat, with the game's rules being the same as the original Australian version (from 2009 to 2016). However, the show returned to its original format on 5 July 2011 after receiving feedback from viewers.

== Graphics ==
At first, Ai là triệu phú had a black interface similar to the most international versions, with a smaller question lozenge. From May 2008, the show switched to the modern blue Rave graphic based on the Australian version. When Ai là triệu phú returned from July 2011, the show used the Norwegian graphic with Arial font.

Since June 2013, the question lozenge was smaller due to VTV3 switching to the 16:9 aspect ratio. Previously, in the Hot Seat version, the question lozenge was also smaller, even though VTV3 was still using the 4:3 aspect ratio. At the end of 2014, Ai là triệu phú switched to a new, more beautiful and easier-to-see blue Rave graphic, inspired by the 2010 purple flux graphic in the UK and France version and blue rave graphic in Latin America and India Hindi.

In 2021, the show switched to a brand new graphic, inspired by the design of Olga van den Brandt (Dutch version) and the 2018 revival of UK version (question lozenge and Phone-a-Friend clock). The question lozenge was expanded to full screen.

=== Filming locations ===
For the first episodes, Ai là triệu phú was filmed at the Gia Lam Gymnasium, Hanoi. The show then moved to S10 studio in mid-2005, and finally to S16 studio of Vietnam Television.

== Money tree ==
=== Original format ===
Question number	Question value (Yellow zones are the guaranteed levels)					
Question number	January 4, 2005 – October 11, 2005	October 18, 2005 – February 20, 2007	February 27, 2007 – August 31, 2010; July 5, 2011 – June 12, 2012	June 19, 2012 – December 28, 2021	January 4, 2022 – March 24, 2026	March 31, 2026 – present
1	100,000₫	100,000₫	100,000₫	200,000₫	200,000₫	1,000,000₫
2	200,000₫	200,000₫	200,000₫	400,000₫	400,000₫	2,000,000₫
3	300,000₫	300,000₫	300,000₫	600,000₫	600,000₫	3,000,000₫
4	500,000₫	500,000₫	500,000₫	1,000,000₫	1,000,000₫	4,000,000₫
5	800,000₫	1,000,000₫	1,000,000₫	2,000,000₫	2,000,000₫	5,000,000₫
6	1,200,000₫	1,800,000₫	2,000,000₫	3,000,000₫	3,000,000₫	6,000,000₫
7	2,000,000₫	3,200,000₫	3,600,000₫	6,000,000₫	6,000,000₫	8,000,000₫
8	3,200,000₫	5,000,000₫	6,000,000₫	10,000,000₫	10,000,000₫	10,000,000₫
9	4,800,000₫	7,000,000₫	9,000,000₫	14,000,000₫	14,000,000₫	14,000,000₫
10	6,800,000₫	10,000,000₫	15,000,000₫	22,000,000₫	22,000,000₫	22,000,000₫
11	10,000,000₫	15,000,000₫	25,000,000₫	30,000,000₫	30,000,000₫	30,000,000₫
12	14,000,000₫	25,000,000₫	35,000,000₫	40,000,000₫	40,000,000₫	60,000,000₫
13	20,000,000₫	40,000,000₫	50,000,000₫	60,000,000₫	80,000,000₫	120,000,000₫
14	30,000,000₫	65,000,000₫	80,000,000₫	85,000,000₫	150,000,000₫	250,000,000₫
15	50,000,000₫	100,000,000₫	120,000,000₫	150,000,000₫	250,000,000₫	500,000,000₫

=== Hot Seat format ===
Question number	Question value
1	1,000,000₫
2	2,000,000₫
3	3,000,000₫
4	4,000,000₫
5	5,000,000₫
6	6,000,000₫
7	8,000,000₫
8	10,000,000₫
9	15,000,000₫
10	20,000,000₫
11	25,000,000₫
12	35,000,000₫
13	50,000,000₫
14	80,000,000₫
15	120,000,000₫

== Notable wins ==
=== Top prize winners ===
- As of September 2026, No one in the show has become an actual top prize winner yet.

=== 14th question correct ===
- Nguyễn Lê Anh won 80,000,000₫ on 9 September 2008.
- Bùi Thị Hà Thanh and Đào Hồng Vũ won 80,000,000₫ on 18 November 2008 (Vietnamese Teachers' Day special).
- Lê Văn Tuân won 80,000,000₫ on 12 April 2011 (Hot Seat version).
- Nguyễn Trường Giang won 150,000,000₫ on 24 March 2026.

== Notable losses ==
=== Top prize losers ===
- Trần Đặng Đăng Khoa won 22,000,000₫ on 5 January 2021. He made it to the 15th question but chose the wrong answer.
- Phạm Cao Long won 80,000,000₫ on 26 November 2024. As he guessed the 14th question correctly, he would have made it to the 15th question had he kept playing. As a result, the producers decided to let him have a mock attempt on the 15th question. Eventually he chose the wrong answer on the mock attempt.

== Basic information ==
- The game was played on VTV's 43rd anniversary special broadcast on 6 September 2013, on VTV1. It was hosted by Đức Khuê. Singer Phương Thanh participated in the game, answered all 15 questions correctly and won the prize of "working as an editor of Ai là triệu phú for one day".
- The show was delayed several times:
  - 8 February 2005, due to 2005 Lunar New Year's eve.
  - 21 June 2005, due to 2005 VTV Cup matches.
  - 13 June 2006, due to 2006 FIFA World Cup matches.
  - 20 March 2018, due to the national mourning of the former Prime Minister Phan Văn Khải.
  - The show didn't air in the Lunar New Year, starting in 2019.
  - 26 January 2021, due to the extended time for the news about 13th National Congress of the Communist Party of Vietnam.

== Related versions ==
=== Rồng vàng ===
Before Ai là triệu phú, Ho Chi Minh City Radio and Television collaborated with Lasta Multimedia to produce a similar programme called Rồng vàng (lit. 'Golden Dragon'), airing from 25 May 2003 to 10 June 2007, with a top prize of VND 50,000,000.
