= Haluatko miljonääriksi? =

Finnish version of Who Wants to Be a Millionaire?

- Created by: David Briggs; Steven Knight; Mike Whitehill
- Presented by: Lasse Lehtinen (1999–2005); Ville Klinga (2005–2007); Jaajo Linnonmaa (2016–2020); Antti Holma (2022–)
- Country of origin: Finland

Original release
- Network: Nelonen
- Release: 12 November 1999 – 15 May 2005
- Network: MTV3
- Release: 3 September 2005 – 4 March 2007
- Network: Nelonen
- Release: 23 January 2016 – present

Haluatko miljonääriksi? (English translation: Do you want to become a millionaire?) is a Finnish game show based on the British format of Who Wants to Be a Millionaire?. The aim of the game is to win €1,000,000 (from 2001 to 2005 - €200,000 and from 1999 to 2001 1,000,000mk) by answering fifteen multiple-choice questions correctly. The show began broadcasting on Nelonen in 1999, and it moved to MTV3 in 2005, before Nelonen resurrected the show in 2016.

As of 2022, the show is hosted by Antti Holma, with Lasse Lehtinen, Ville Klinga, and Jaajo Linnonmaa having served in the position before him.

The largest win in the series occurred in October 2002 when 18-year-old student Markku Rikola won €70,000 of the then-maximum €200,000.

== Gameplay ==
=== Fastest Finger First ===
Before the contestant plays the game, they must beat five other contestants in a minigame known best internationally as "Fastest Finger First". Contestants have to rearrange four answers into the correct order in the fastest time out of the six contestants.

=== Into the Hot Seat ===
When playing the main game, contestants must climb up the money tree by answering fifteen multiple-choice general knowledge questions correctly. The money won is not cumulative, for example if a contestant passes the €200 mark, they win €200, not €100 + €200. The contestant can walk away with the money they have at any time. If the contestant answers incorrectly, they return to the last safety net they achieved.

To aid the contestant there are three "lifelines" - Fifty-Fifty (50:50), Phone-a-Friend (Kilauta kaverille) and Ask the Audience (Kysy yleisöltä, earlier Kysy katsomolta). If the contestant answers the fifth question correctly, they will leave with at least €1,000 (10,000 mk from 1999-2001; €2,000 from 2001-2005 and 2005-2007). If they answer the tenth question correctly, they will leave with at least €10,000 (100,000mk, 1999-2001; €20,000 from 2001-2005; €15,000 from 2005-2007).

== Seasons ==
Season	Start date	End date	Episodes
Autumn 1999	12 November 1999	27 December 1999	21
Spring 2000	14 April 2000	14 May 2000	15
Autumn 2000	15 October 2000	3 December 2000	18
Spring 2001	4 February 2001	8 April 2001	10
Autumn 2001	7 October 2001	9 December 2001	10
Spring 2002	24 February 2002	28 April 2002	10
Autumn 2002	11 October 2002	15 December 2002	30
Spring 2003	14 February 2003	20 April 2003	30
Autumn 2003	24 August 2003	28 December 2003	20
Spring 2004	25 January 2004	23 May 2004	18
Autumn 2004	5 September 2004	5 December 2004	14
Spring 2005	30 January 2005	15 May 2005	16
Autumn 2005	3 September 2005	17 December 2005	16
Spring 2006	25 February 2006	3 June 2006	14
Autumn 2006	7 October 2006	23 December 2006	12
Spring 2007	14 January 2007	4 March 2007	8
Spring 2016	23 January 2016	9 April 2016	12
Autumn 2016	3 September 2016	3 December 2016	14
Spring 2017	11 February 2017	27 May 2017	16
Autumn 2017	2 September 2017	9 December 2017	15
Spring 2018	10 February 2018	26 May 2018	16
Autumn 2018	1 September 2018	1 December 2018	15
Spring 2019	16 February 2019	25 May 2019	15
Autumn 2019	14 September 2019	16 November 2019	10
Spring 2020	4 April 2020	30 May 2020	9
Autumn 2020	12 September 2020	17 October 2020	6
Autumn 2022	27 August 2022	29 October 2022	10
Spring 2023	16 March 2023	18 May 2023	10
Autumn 2023	13 September 2023	1 November 2023	8
Spring 2024	20 April 2024	8 June 2024	8
Autumn 2024	4 September 2024	20 November 2024	12
Total	12 November 1999	20 November 2024	441

== Haluatko miljonääriksi? Payout Structure ==
Question number	Question value (Yellow zones are the guaranteed levels)			
Question number	1999–2001	2002–2005	2005–2007	2016–2020 2022–
1	500mk (€84)	€200	€200	€100
2	1,000mk (€168)	€450	€450	€300
3	2,500mk (€420)	€700	€700	€500
4	5,000mk (€840)	€1,000	€1,000	€700
5	10,000mk (€1,680)	€2,000	€2,000	€1,000
6	15,000mk (€2,522)	€3,000	€3,000	€2,000
7	30,000mk (€5,044)	€5,000	€4,000	€3,000
8	50,000mk (€8,400)	€8,000	€5,000	€5,000
9	75,000mk (€12,614)	€12,000	€10,000	€7,000
10	100,000mk (€16,800)	€20,000	€15,000	€10,000
11	150,000mk (€25,220)	€30,000	€20,000	€15,000
12	250,000mk (€33,643)	€45,000	€30,000	€30,000
13	350,000mk (€58,866)	€70,000	€60,000	€60,000
14	500,000mk (€84,094)	€100,000	€200,000	€200,000
15	1,000,000mk (€168,187)	€200,000	€1,000,000	€1,000,000
