= Emmanuel Ceysson =

French harpist and academic

Emmanuel Ceysson is a French harpist and academic. He is principal harpist in the Los Angeles Philharmonic. Formerly, he was principal harpist in the Metropolitan Opera Orchestra and the Orchestra of the Opéra National de Paris (2005–2015). In 2004 he won the Gold Medal and a special performance prize at the USA International Harp Competition. In 2006 he earned First Prize and six special prizes at the Young Concert Artists Competition in New York City, and in 2009 he received First Prize at the ARD International Music Competition in Munich. He currently serves as professor of Harp at the Mannes School of Music, and was previously Professor of Harp at the Royal Academy of Music in London from 2005 to 2009. Since 2010 he has taught harp in the summers at the Académie internationale d'été de Nice.

Ceysson is married to finnish actor and TV host Antti Holma.

== Recordings ==
- Belle-Epoque (2015)

Opera fantaisie, 2012
