= Ville Klinga =

Finnish TV presenter (born 1968)

- Born: 10 May 1968 (age 57); Finland
- Occupation: Television presenter

Ville Klinga (born 1968) is a Finnish TV presenter. He is married and has children.

== Work ==
Klinga worked on Yle from 1990, but in 2005 he resigned and replaced Lasse Lehtinen in hosting of Haluatko miljonääriksi? game show. Klinga also produced Jumppa, a Finnish exercise and fitness television series hosted by Anne Soini and Katja Laaksonen.
