= 2waytraffic =

Dutch television production company

- Type: In-name-only unit of Sony Pictures Television
- Industry: Interactive entertainment Television production
- Founded: 2004; 22 years ago
- Founders: Kees Abrahams; Unico Glorie; Taco Ketelaar; Henk Keilman
- Defunct: 2012; 14 years ago (as a company); 2013; 13 years ago (as a brand)
- Fate: Renamed as Sony Pictures Television International Formats; brand retired in 2013, but remained in use on internationally licensed shows until 2021; currently an in-name-only unit of Sony Pictures Television
- Successor: Sony Pictures Television
- Headquarters: Hilversum, Netherlands
- Number of locations: 7 offices
- Area served: Worldwide
- Services: Television production Broadcast syndication Light entertainment Online games Website development Mobile marketing Mobile entertainment
- Revenue: €29,308,539 (2006)
- Operating income: €4,436,233 (2006)
- Net income: €2,923,396 (2006)
- Total assets: €301,747,019 (2006)
- Total equity: €104,014,193 (2006)
- Number of employees: 150 (2006)
- Parent: Sony Pictures Television International (2008–2009); Sony Pictures Television (2009–2012)
- Divisions: 2waytraffic Mobile
- Subsidiaries: 2waytraffic International
- Website: 2waytraffic.com/en at the Wayback Machine (archived 2010-01-06)

2waytraffic was a television production company based in Hilversum, Netherlands. It was established in 2004 by former Endemol executives Kees Abrahams, Unico Glorie, Taco Ketelaar, and Henk Keilman. The company had offices in London, New York, Budapest, Stockholm, and Madrid.

2waytraffic also produced a number of phone-in quiz shows such as Play, Garito and Game On, where viewers could call to a premium-rate phone number for a theoretical chance to earn cash prizes.

== History ==
The company expanded significantly in 2006 with three acquisitions, beginning with Emexus, which provides a technology platform for content aggregation and service and applications delivery in the fields of mobile marketing, mobile entertainment and mobile Internet, in June and then the content developer Intellygents in August. The most notable acquisition, however, was that of the rights of Celador International and its programme library, including the international Who Wants to Be a Millionaire? franchise, on December 1, 2006.

On March 14, 2007, Celador International Limited was relaunched as 2waytraffic International.

=== Sony era ===
On June 4, 2008, 2waytraffic was acquired by 2JS Productions, a subsidiary of Sony Pictures Entertainment. On September 29, 2waytraffic became the distributor of the entertainment formats by SPTI.

On April 1, 2009, Sony Pictures Entertainment consolidated its US and international television companies under the SPT roof such as: 2waytraffic, Embassy Row, Starling, Teleset, and Lean-M. Sony Pictures Television International now operates in-name-only.

In April 2012, 2waytraffic was renamed "Sony Pictures Television International Formats", with the 2waytraffic logo being replaced in next years by the Sony Pictures Television logo on internationally licensed shows, where the 2waytraffic brand was discontinued in 2013. It's currently an in-name-only unit of Sony Pictures Television, with copyrights to 2waytraffic's formats currently being assigned to CPT Holdings, Inc., one of the companies behind Sony Pictures Television.

== Companies by 2waytraffic ==
=== 2waytraffic International, Sony Pictures Television ===
Formerly Celador International, this company owns, distributes, licenses, and operates over 200 game show formats such as Who Wants to Be a Millionaire? in the United States, UK, Eastern Europe, and Nordic. After SPE acquired 2waytrafic, the international subsidiary became 2waytraffic International, Sony Pictures Television, and was headed by Ed Louwerse.

=== Emexus Group ===
Emexus is a mobile company acquired by 2waytraffic on June 13, 2006, which was later renamed as 2waytraffic Mobile.

=== Intellygents ===
Intellygents was established in 2002 by former Endemol employees Kirsten van Nieuwenhuijzen and Mark van Berkel, and acquired by 2waytraffic on July 11, 2006. It is a creative developing company for intelligent entertainment, with formats such as That's the Question, Take It or Leave It, The Greatest Royalty Expert and Who Wants to Be a Millionaire's first spin-off game show 50-50.

In 2010, following Sony's acquisition of 60% of Tuvalu Media, Intellygents was integrated into that company.

In December 2013, Tuvalu's management joined forces with financing firm Karmign to acquire SPT's 60% stake in the company. The Intellygents brand had by then been retired, though its formats remain with Tuvalu.
