= Lasse Lehtinen =

Finnish politician

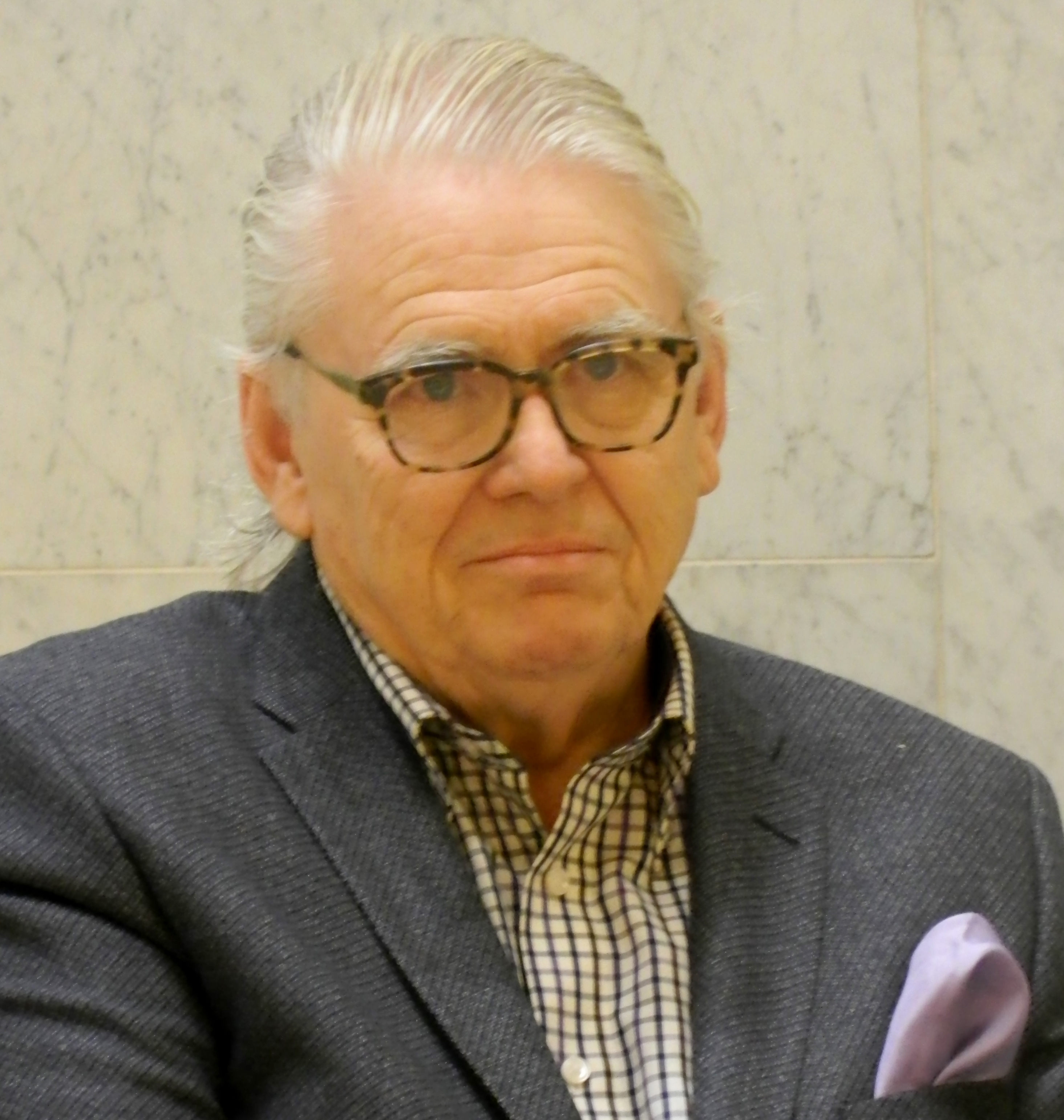
Lasse Lehtinen at the Academic Bookstore in 2018.

Lasse Lehtinen (born 23 January 1947 in Kotka) is a Finnish politician, former Member of the Finnish Parliament and former Member of the European Parliament (MEP). He is a member of the Social Democratic Party of Finland, which is part of the Party of European Socialists, and sat on the European Parliament's Committee on the Internal Market and Consumer Protection.

He was also a substitute for the Committee on Employment and Social Affairs, vice-chair of the delegation for relations with Canada, and a substitute for the delegation for relations with the countries of South Asia and the South Asian Association for Regional Cooperation.

He hosted the Finnish version of the television quiz Who Wants to Be a Millionaire? (Haluatko miljonääriksi?) for years before becoming an MEP. At the beginning of the 2000s he was among the contributors of the Kanava magazine.

Lehtinen was awarded the Freedom of the City of London on 21 September 2007.

== Career ==
- Doctor of Philosophy (2002)
- Journalist (since 1962)
- Diplomat (1983-1990)
- Senior Vice-President, Corporate Affairs (1990-1993)
- Writer and television producer (1993-2004)
- Member, Kuopio town council (1968-1980)
- Member of Parliament (1972-1983)
