= Antti Holma =

Finnish actor, writer and author (born 1982)

Antti Olavi Holma (born 6 December 1982 in Helsinki) is a Finnish actor, writer and author. As an actor, he gained popularity after appearing in the sixth season of the sketch comedy show Putous in 2014. He released his debut novel Järjestäjä in 2014, followed by a poetry book Kauheimmat runot in 2015.

Holma debuted as the host of the quiz show Haluatko miljonääriksi? in August 2022, succeeding Jaajo Linnonmaa.

== Personal life ==
Holma is openly gay, and is married to a French harpist Emmanuel Ceysson.

In 2016, he moved from Finland to London, England. In 2018, he moved from London to New York City. In 2020, he moved to Los Angeles, West Coast of United States.

== Selected filmography ==
Films

- Tali-Ihantala 1944 (2007)
- Ei kiitos (2014)
- Armi elää! (2015)
- Kanelia kainaloon, Tatu ja Patu! (2016)
- Veljeni vartija (2018)

Television

- Tauno Tukevan sota (2010)
- Myllyrinne Company (2014)
- Putous (2014)
- Kingi (2015)
- Haluatko miljonääriksi? (2022–present)

Podcasts

- Radio Sodoma (2017, 2019)
- Auta Antti! (2018–2019)
- Antti Holman oopperajuhlat (2020)
- Antin Palautepalvelu (2021-2022)
- Antin Matka, (previously known as Antin koulumatka) (2022-)
- Antin Elokuvakerho (2024)
