= Stani Bogat =

Bulgarian quiz show

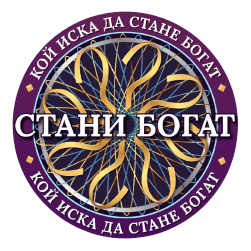
- Also known as: Кой иска да стане богат?
- Bulgarian: Стани богат
- Genre: Quiz show
- Created by: David Briggs; Steven Knight; Mike Whitehill
- Based on: Who Wants to Be a Millionaire?
- Presented by: Niki Kanchev (2001-2014,2024-); Mihail Bilalov (2018-2023)

Production
- Camera setup: Multi-camera

Original release
- Network: Nova (2001-2014); BNT 1 (2018-2020) bTV (2021-present)

Stani bogat (Bulgarian: Кой иска да стане богат?, romanized: Koy iska da stane bogat?, lit. 'Who wants to become rich?', shortened to Стани богат, 'Become rich') is a Bulgarian quiz show based on the original British format of Who Wants to Be a Millionaire?. The show is hosted by Niki Kanchev, previously by Mihail Bilalov. The top winning prize is 125,000/100,000 euro and may be reached by answering 15 questions correctly. There are four "lifelines", which offer help to the player during the game. They are 50/50, phone a friend, plus one and ask the host. As of 2025, no person has won 100,000 leva/euro (although Asen Angelov won, he was stripped of his prize). There is one milestone at 300 euro and a floating one, a change from 2021.

== History ==
=== 2001—2014 ===
Stani bogat premiered on May 12, 2001 on Nova TV with host Niki Kanchev. Initially, the show's studio in Romania was used, but subsequently a set was built in a studio complex in Sofia. Over the years, changes have been made to the amounts the contestants win, but for the first time in 2008 the grand prize amount was increased. With the start of the season in 2008, a correct answer to the 15th question would earn the player 200,000 leva. Over a period of about a year, with the start of the same season, a fourth wildcard was introduced into the rules.

In the final years of its broadcast on the Nova TV channel, only celebrities who play for charity have participated in the show. The last edition of the show with host Niki Kanchev was on May 30, 2014.

=== 2018–2020 ===
After a 4-year hiatus, the show returned in 2018 on the air of BNT 1, airing from 1 April at 19:00 every weekday with host Mihail Bilalov. In this version of the show, the Fastest Finger First was removed and all participants go directly to the main game. The grand prize is again 100 000 leva and the levels of the amounts have been lowered.

After a short break, the last filmed episodes of the show are broadcast every Saturday and Sunday at 19:00. The show is broadcast on public television until 26 January 2020. At the hearing during the competition for the position of Director General of BNT, the subsequently elected Emil Koshlukov announced that Stani bogat was "too expensive and BNT cannot afford it".

=== 2021–present ===
On 20 December 2021 the show returned on the air of bTV. The host is again Mihail Bilalov, and the show is broadcast every weekday at 18:00. The season is announced as an "anniversary season" – under the motto "20 years in Bulgaria" (Bulgarian: 20 години в България). After the initial 70 episodes, the broadcast of new episodes began immediately. With their launch, the show became available on the SVOD platform of the media group "Voyo".

On 27 January 2022, the broadcaster launched the online game "Stani bogat." In it, the player has 60 seconds to answer each of the questions using the classic form with 15 questions and 2 safe amounts. Instead of cash amounts, participants in the online game earn "titles".

A year after the show's launch, bTV television announced on air that interest in Stani bogat was extremely high. The game attracts an average of 39% of all TV viewers, according to data from peoplemetric agency GARB.

In 2022, the book of the same name "Stani bogat", which features questions, trivia and answers, part of the classic game, was released commercially. A year later, a second book with the motto "The World is in Your Hands" was released - with questions about different countries around the world.

On September 5, 2022 the second season starts, on February 13, 2023 the third season starts, and on September 4, 2023 the fourth season starts for bTV. With reruns airing in the months between the premiere episodes.

On April 7, 2023, journalist Lyubomir Lazarov managed to open the 15th question of the game, but gave up his game and left with the sum of 50,000 leva. The opening of the last question happened for the third time in the history of Stani bogat and for the first time since Mihail Bilalov was the host.

In the summer of 2023 every Sunday at 20:00, bTV broadcast 8 charity episodes of the show under the name "Stani bogat — A Question of the Future" (Bulgarian: Стани богат – Въпрос на бъдеще). In the different episodes, participants are celebrities in tandem with a representative of the noble cause they are playing for. In the first and last episode the host is the titular Mihail Bilalov, and in the other guest hosts are Daniel Tsochev, Georgi Milkov, Peter Stoyanovich, Maria Sylvester, Ivo Ivanov and Zlatimir Yochev.

On January 14, 2024, Mihail Bilalov announced on the 120 Minuti program that he was leaving as host of the game show due to many other projects he was involved with. Since then, he has been replaced by former host Niki Kanchev.

On January 22, 2026, bTV announced a new season, to begin airing in February, that introduced a new top prize of 100,000 euro, due to a change in Bulgaria's currency.

The show's 25th anniversary season was announced with the top prize increased to 125,000 euro for the classic format only if chosen by the contestant.

== Broadcast ==
TV channel	Period	Episodes	Start	Final	Host	Winner(s)
NOVA	2001 – 2014	–	May 12, 2001	June 2, 2011	Niki Kanchev	None
NOVA	2013 (spring)	20	February 4, 2013	June 6, 2013	Niki Kanchev	None
NOVA	2014 (spring)	16	February 10, 2014	May 30, 2014	Niki Kanchev	None
BNT 1	2018 (spring)	54	April 1, 2018	June 13, 2018	Mihail Bilalov	None
BNT 1	2018 – 2019 (autumn-spring)	192	September 10, 2018	June 14, 2019	Mihail Bilalov	None
BNT 1	2019 – 2020 (autumn-winter)	35	September 14, 2019	January 26, 2020	Mihail Bilalov	None
bTV	2021 – 2022 (winter-spring)	110	December 20, 2021	May 20, 2022	Mihail Bilalov	None
bTV	2022 (autumn)	75	September 5, 2022	December 16, 2022	Mihail Bilalov	None
bTV	2023 (spring-summer)	78	February 13, 2023	July 23, 2023	Mihail Bilalov	None
bTV	2023 (autumn)	70	September 4, 2023	December 8, 2023	Mihail Bilalov	None
bTV	2024 (spring)	71	February 17, 2024	May 24, 2024	Niki Kanchev	None
bTV	2024 (autumn)	69	September 2, 2024	December 5, 2024	Niki Kanchev	None
bTV	2025 (spring)	60	February 17, 2025	May 9, 2025	Niki Kanchev	None
bTV	2025 (autumn)	75	September 6, 2025	December 13, 2025	Niki Kanchev	None
bTV	2026 (spring)	60	February 16, 2026	May 8, 2026	Niki Kanchev	None
bTV	2026 (autumn)		September 7, 2026		Niki Kanchev	

== Game Rules ==
- The participant answers questions, each with a choice of four answer options - A, B, C, or D. One is the correct answer, the other three are wrong. The classic format of the game is with the so-called "Money tree" of 15 questions, but there is a format in which only 12 are asked. In Bulgaria, this format was used in the period 2009 - 2014.
- The first certain amount, which cannot be lost by the player even if the answer is wrong, is €300 on the 5th question. The classic 15-question game format determines a second sure amount on the 10th question. From 2021, however, a "Floating second certain amount" has been introduced. Its value is determined by the participant before asking the relevant question between the 6th and the 14th - from €500 to €50,000.
- With a correct answer to a previous question, the participant can abandon the game of the current question in order not to risk his winnings.
- During the game, the participant has the right to use jokers. The classic format has three jokers: "Audience Help", "50 on 50" (two wrong answers are eliminated) and "Call a friend". As of September 11, 2023, the Audience Help wildcard has been replaced by Studio Friend Help. For a short time in Bulgaria, a fourth was introduced to the classic jokers - "Change the question", which can be used after the first certain amount and the question is replaced by another one, but of the same level of difficulty. As of September 30, 2024, a new fourth joker has been introduced in the Ask the Host game with Niki Kanchev. The participant may choose to use only three of his four possible jokers in his game.
- With correct answers to all 15 questions, the participant becomes the winner of Stani bogat and wins the top prize. Until 2025, it was BGN 100,000, and from 2026 it has been increased to €100,000. In the autumn 2026 special season, celebrating the 25th anniversary of Stani bogat in Bulgaria, the contestant can choose between the classic version, with a top prize of €125,000, and the modern version, with a top prize of €100,000. For a short period, the top prize in the Bulgarian edition was BGN 200,000 for correct answers to 12 questions.
- Before the actual game, 10 selected participants compete in the Fastest Wins round. In it, the players arrange in the correct order the answers to the question asked by the presenter. The player with the fastest answer wins the right to compete for the grand prize. Currently, the round is not part of the Bulgarian version.

== Money Tree ==
Payout structure
Question number	Bulgarian lev							Euro	
Question number	2001– 2002	2002– 2007	2008– 2009	2009– 2010	2010– 2014	2018– 2020	2021– 2025	2026–	
15 (12)	100,000		200,000		100,000				125,000
14 (11)	50,000		100,000		20,000		50,000		50,000
13 (10)	25,000		50,000		15,000		30,000	20,000	20,000
12 (9)	10,000		20,000		10,000		20,000	10,000	10,000
11 (8)	5,000		10,000		5,000		10,000	5,000	5,000
10 (7)	2,500	3,000	5,000		3,000	2,500	5,000	2,500	2,500
9 (6)	2,000	2,500				2,000	3,000	1,500	1,500
8 (5)	1,500	2,000				1,500	2,000	1,000	1,000
7 (4)	1,000	1,500				1,000	1,500	750	750
6 (3)	500	1,000				700	1,000	500	500
5 (2)	250	500						300	
4 (1)	200	400			250	300	400	250	
3	150	300		—N/a		200	300	200	
2	100	200		—N/a		100	200	150	
1	50	100		—N/a		50	100		
Milestone Custom milestone Top prize

== Notable participants ==
=== Asen Angelov ===
On 13 June 2002, Asen Angelov answered the 15th question correctly and won 100 000 leva. Two weeks later he was forced to return the money after the production company found out that his daughter, Iskra, works at Nova Television. Angelov stated that ''his daughter is not a member of the family, since she is 27 years old'' but later said that he will not argue over the money, and returned it voluntarily.

=== Lyubomir Lazarov ===
On 7 April 2023, journalist Lyubomir Lazarov opened the 15th question for 100 000 leva. He eventually gave up and walked away with the runner-up prize of 50 000 leva. This is the 3rd time the last question has been opened overall and the first time with host Mihail Bilalov.
