= List of The Voice of Ireland contestants =

This is a list of contestants who have appeared on the reality television competition The Voice of Ireland. In its five years running, five artists have been granted the title of "The Voice of Ireland" – Pat Byrne, Keith Hanley, Brendan McCahey, Patrick Donoghue and Michael Lawson. There were 48 contestants on its first series, 49 contestants on its second series, 41 contestants on its third series, 56 contestants on its fourth series and 56 contestants on its fifth series.

== Contestants ==
Winners

Pat Byrne
Series 1

Keith Hanley
Series 2

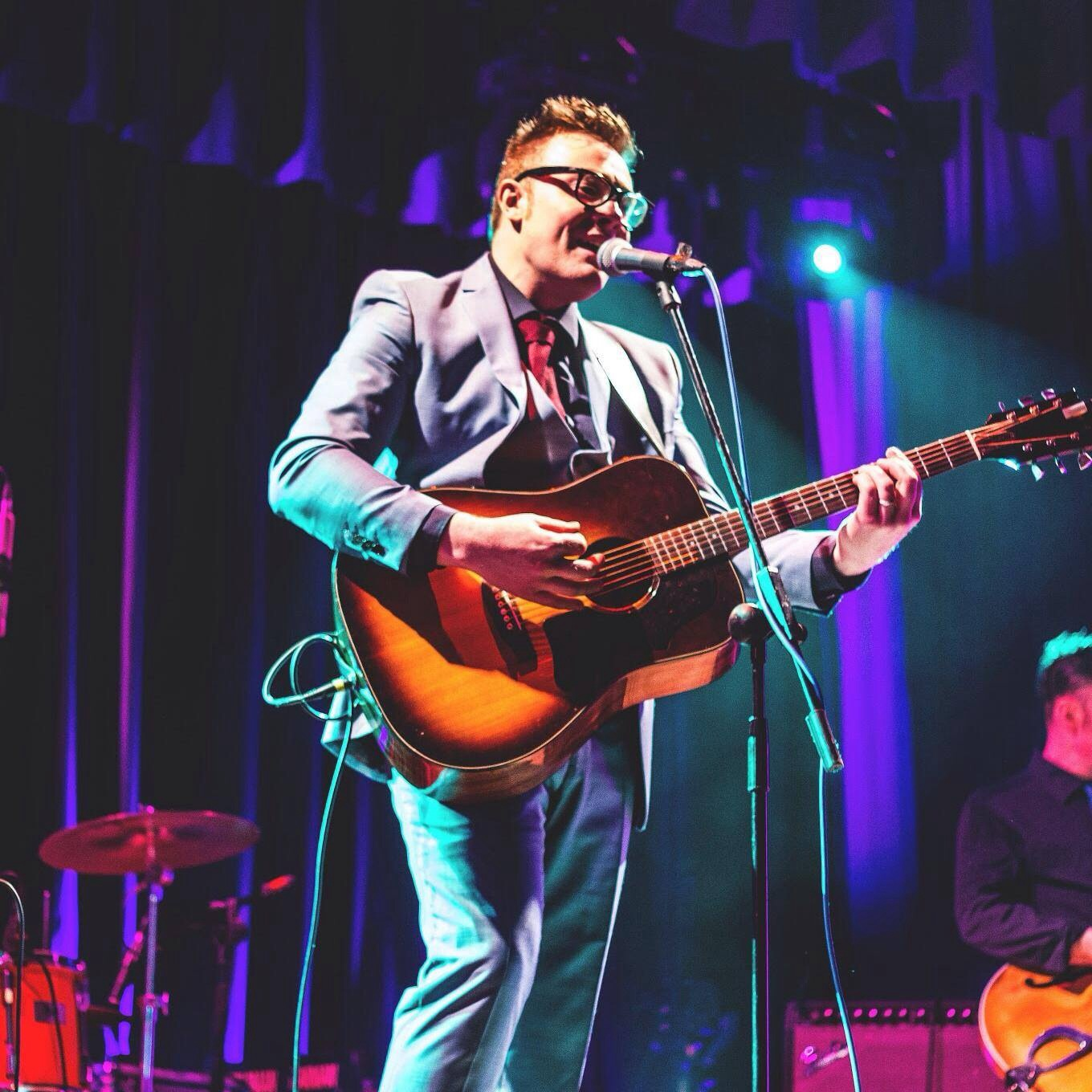
Brendan McCahey
Series 3

Patrick Donoghue
Series 4

Michael Lawson
Series 5

Contestant	Coach	Series	Finish
Aaron Caroll	Kian Egan	5	
Adam Cummins	Kian Egan	4	Battle Rounds
Aisling Connolly	Jamelia ^{A}	3	Top 10
Alan Fitzsimons	Brian Kennedy	1	Live Shows
Alan Lawlor	Sharon Corr	1	Battle Rounds
Alex Sykes	Rachel Stevens	5	
Alexandra Miller	Jamelia	2	Battle Rounds
Alibhne Hession	Sharon Corr	1	Battle Rounds
Alison Rushe	Rachel Stevens	5	
Amy Hansard	Rachel Stevens	4	Knockouts
Anna O'Hanlon	Dolores O'Riordan	3	Battle Rounds
Andrew Berry	Kian Egan	5	
Andrew Mann	Bressie	2	Live Shows
Andy Mac Unfraidh	Kian Egan	2	Live Shows
Angela Shanny	Brian Kennedy	1	Battle Rounds
Aoife McLoughlin	Sharon Corr	2	Top 10
Aoife Smith	Bressie	4	Battle Rounds
Ashley Crowe	Una Foden	5	
Ashley Loftus	Bressie	4	Knockouts
Barry Beatty	Jamelia	2	Battle Rounds
Ben Tighe	Jamelia	2	Battle Rounds
Bob McQuaid	Sharon Corr	2	Battle Rounds
Brendan Keeley	Brian Kennedy	1	Live Shows
Brendan McCahey	Bressie	3	Winner
Brian Dunne	Rachel Stevens	4	Battle Rounds
Caoimhe McCarthy	Rachel Stevens	5	
Caoin Fitz	Kian Egan	4	Knockouts
Caoin Fitzpatrick	Bressie	3	Battle Rounds
Carl Gillic	Kian Egan	5	
Carolann Haskins	Bressie	1	Battle Rounds
Catherine Hughes	Jamelia	3	Battle Rounds (withdrew)
Catherine Hughes	Bressie	4	Battle Rounds
Cathy Moore	Kian Egan	5	
Chloe Wilders	Una Foden	4	Knockouts
Chris Brady	Kian Egan	4	Knockouts
Christina Foran	Kian Egan	1	Battle Rounds
Christopher Stoodley	Kian Egan	3	Battle Rounds
Cian O'Melia	Rachel Stevens	4	Knockouts
Ciara Cox	Sharon Corr	2	Battle Rounds
Ciara Donnelly	Bressie	3	Live Shows
Ciara Freeman	Kian Egan	5	
Ciara Monaghan	Kian Egan	4	Knockouts
Ciaran O'Driscoll	Rachel Stevens	5	Live Shots
Claire O'Loughlin	Brian Kennedy	1	Live Shows
Clodagh Lawlor	Kian Egan	5	
Colin Hand	Brian Kennedy	1	Battle Rounds
Colm Conlon	Kian Egan	4	Knockouts
Conor Quinn	Bressie	1	Live Shows
Conor Ryan	Brian Kennedy	1	Battle Rounds
Craig McMarrow	Kian Egan	3	Live Shows
Cristin Nolan	Rachel Stevens	4	Battle Rounds
Dagan Vickers	Kian Egan	3	Battle Rounds
Daisy Venezuela	Jamelia	3	Live Shows
Dan Twomey	Sharon Corr	1	Battle Rounds
Danica Holland	Kian Egan	3	Top 10
Danielle Ward	Kian Egan	2	Battle Rounds
Dara Molloy	Bressie	1	Battle Rounds
Daragh Kiely	Kian Egan	3	Battle Rounds
Darragh Lee	Kian Egan	5	
Daryl Phillips	Kian Egan	2	Live Shows
David Idioh	Bressie	5	
David Merriman	Bressie	2	Battle Rounds
Dean Anthony	Sharon Corr	2	Live Shows
Dean Forrester	Bressie	4	Knockouts
Denise Morgan	Bressie	4	Live Shows
Derek Power	Kian Egan	2	Battle Rounds
Dervla Magennis	Bressie	1	Battle Rounds
Donna McDade	Bressie	5	
Dylan Powell	Jamelia	2	Live Shows
Eimear Crealey	Una Foden	5	
Ellie-May Bopp	Rachel Stevens	4	Knockouts (withdrew)
Elliot Canavan Doyle	Kian Egan	1	Live Shows
Emma Collins	Jamelia	3	Battle Rounds
Emma Humber	Bressie	4	Runner-up
Emma Walsh	Dolores O'Riordan ^{B}	3	Live Shows
Emmett Daly	Una Foden	5	Live Shows
Emmie Reek	Una Foden	5	Live Shows
Eoin Dixon Murphy	Bressie	2	Battle Rounds
Erica O'Hara	Jamelia	2	Battle Rounds
Erin Rice	Rachel Stevens	5	
Evan Cotter	Una Foden	4	Knockouts
Fauve Chapman	Sharon Corr	1	Live Shows
Fiona Garvey	Una Foden	5	
Fiona McCourt	Sharon Corr	2	Battle Rounds
Fionn Gardner	Kian Egan	4	Live Shows
Gari Deegan	Bressie	1	Live Shows
Gary Tighe	Sharon Corr	2	Battle Rounds
Gavin Kenny	Bressie	1	Live Shows
Gavin Murray	Jamelia	3	Top 10
Gemma Lomar	Rachel Stevens	4	Knockouts
Georgina Richmond	Bressie	5	
Gerard McLoughlin	Sharon Corr	2	Battle Rounds
Graham Dowling	Kian Egan	1	Live Shows
Hannah Ferguson	Una Foden	5	
Hannah Stockwell-Quinn	Bressie	4	Battle Rounds
Heather Stuart	Bressie	3	Battle Rounds
Helena Bradley Bates	Kian Egan	4	Live Shows
Ingrid Madsen	Sharon Corr	1	Battle Rounds
Jamie Hartigan	Kian Egan	3	Battle Rounds
James Sheridan	Bressie	2	Battle Rounds
Jamie Stanton	Bressie ^{C}	3	4th place
Jasmine Kavanagh	Kian Egan	5	Live Shows
Jay Boland	Kian Egan	3	Top 10
Jennifer Healy	Kian Egan	2	Battle Rounds
Jennifer Lyons	Sharon Corr	2	Battle Rounds
Jennifer Moore	Jamelia	2	Live Shows
Jessica Brett	Rachel Stevens	5	
Jessica Pritzel	Bressie	1	Live Shows
Jim Devine	Kian Egan	1	4th place
Jo Petit	Kian Egan	4	Battle Rounds
Joey McAleer	Kian Egan	2	Battle Rounds
John Bonham	Kian Egan	4	Live Shows
John Gaughan	Sharon Corr	2	Top 10
John Hogan	Dolores O'Riordan	3	Live Shows
John O'Grady	Bressie	4	Knockouts
John Sheehy	Una Foden	4	Live Shows
Johnny Garvey	Rachel Stevens	5	
Johnny Kohlmeyer	Una Foden	5	
Jolene Burns	Bressie	4	Battle Rounds
Jordon O'Neill	Rachel Stevens	5	
Karen Louise	Bressie	5	
Karl Sheridan	Kian Egan	2	Battle Rounds
Karla Chubb	Kian Egan	4	Battle Rounds
Kate Donohoe	Sharon Corr	1	Battle Rounds
Kate Gilmore	Bressie	1	Battle Rounds
Kate Purcell	Kian Egan	4	Knockouts
Kathleen Mahon	Una Foden	4	Knockouts
Katy Anna Mohan	Bressie	2	Top 10
Kayleigh Cullinan	Bressie	4	Live Shows
Kedar Friis-Lawrence	Bressie	3	Live Shows
Keith Hanley	Jamelia	2	Winner
Kelesa Mulcahy	Kian Egan	5	Runner-up
Kellie Blaise	Sharon Corr	1	Live Shows
Kellie Lewis	Dolores O'Riordan	3	Runner-up
Kelley McArdle	Una Foden	4	Knockouts
Kelly Hannon	Jamelia	3	Battle Rounds
Kelly Mongan	Kian Egan	2	Runner-up
Kelsey Hoare	Kian Egan	5	
Ken Murphy	Bressie	4	Knockouts
Kenneth Usher	Bressie	4	Battle Rounds
Kevin Keeley	Sharon Corr	1	Live Shows
Kiera Byrne	Bressie	1	Live Shows
Kieran McKillop	Rachel Stevens	4	4th place
Kim Hayden	Sharon Corr	1	Live Shows
Kirilee Dermot	Bressie	2	Battle Rounds
Kirsty Rose	Una Foden	5	
Kyle Kennedy	Kian Egan	1	Live Shows
Lata McCarthy	Brian Kennedy	1	Battle Rounds
Laura Doyle	Kian Egan	5	
Laura Enright	Bressie	4	Knockouts
Laura May	Jamelia	3	3rd place
Laura O'Connor	Kian Egan	3	Live Shows
Laura O'Connor	Rachel Stevens	5	4th place
Leah McConnell	Jamelia	3	Battle Rounds
Leanne Power	Rachel Stevens	4	Battle Rounds
Liam Geddes	Kian Egan	1	Live Shows
Lindsay Hamilton	Brian Kennedy	1	Battle Rounds
Loic Bontemps	Rachel Stevens	5	
Lola Arisekola	Una Foden	5	
Lorna Jordan	Kian Egan	1	Battle Rounds
Lucy O'Byrne	Kian Egan	1	Battle Rounds
Luke Ray Lacey	Kian Egan	5	Live Shows
Mags White	Una Foden	5	
Malachy Gaughan	Jamelia	3	Battle Rounds
Malcolm Urquhart	Rachel Stevens	4	Battle Rounds
Maria Cuche	Una Foden	5	
Mariah Butler	Dolores O'Riordan	3	Top 10
Mairead Conlon	Bressie	2	Battle Rounds
Marc Egan	Bressie	5	
Mark Guildea	Sharon Corr	2	Live Shows
Mark Joyce	Una Foden	4	Battles
Mark McLaughlin	Sharon Corr	2	Battle Rounds (withdrew)
Martin McInerney	Jamelia	3	Live Shows
Marty Bonner	Bressie	5	
Mary Ward	Kian Egan	5	
Matthew Soares	Rachel Stevens	5	Live Shows
Michael Lawson	Bressie	5	Winner
Michaela Hogg	Bressie	5	
Michelle Cunningham	Bressie	2	Battle Rounds
Michelle Devins	Dolores O'Riordan	3	Live Shows
Moylan Brunnock	Bressie	5	Live Shows
Neil McGrath	Brian Kennedy	1	Battle Rounds
Nella Dwyer	Dolores O'Riordan	3	Battle Rounds
Nerissa Moore	Bressie	5	
Niall O'Halloran	Una Foden	4	Live Shows
Niamh Armstrong	Jamelia	2	Battle Rounds
Niamh O'Neill	Kian Egan	2	Battle Rounds
Nicky Wicks	Bressie	5	
Nicola Lynch	Una Foden	4	Knockouts
Nigel Connell	Una Foden	5	3rd place
Nik McDonald	Kian Egan	5	
Nikita O'Rowe	Bressie	1	Battle Rounds
Nollaig O'Connor	Sharon Corr	1	Live Shows
Onya Gray	Sharon Corr	1	Battle Rounds
Paddy Molloy	Kian Egan	3	Top 10
Paddy Reilly	Bressie	3	Battle Rounds
Pádraig Byrne	Bressie	3	Live Shows
Pat Byrne	Bressie	1	Winner
Pat Fitz	Kian Egan	4	Knockouts
Patrick Donoghue	Una Foden	4	Winner
Patrick Kennedy	Rachel Stevens	4	Live Shows
Patrick Leowen	Bressie	5	
Paul Taylor	Rachel Stevens	4	Knockouts
Pauric McLaughlin	Kian Egan ^{C}	3	Live Shows
Pauric O'Meara	Bressie	5	
Peter Whitford	Dolores O'Riordan	3	Live Shows
Philip Kennedy	Kian Egan	2	Battle Rounds
Rachel Murphy	Una Foden	4	Battle Rounds
Ray Scully	Kian Egan	2	Top 10
Rebecca Kelly	Kian Egan	4	Battle Rounds
Remy Naidoo	Jamelia	3	Live Shows
Richie Hayes	Brian Kennedy	1	Runner-up
Roel Villones	Bressie	3	Battle Rounds
Roisín Carlin	Jamelia	2	Live Shows
Ronan O'Healy	Rachel Stevens	4	Battle Rounds
Rory Quinn	Bressie	1	Battle Rounds
Russell Hogg	Bressie	4	Battle Rounds
Ryan O'Shaughnessy	Brian Kennedy	1	Live Shows
Sandra Jane Hyland	Kian Egan	1	Battle Rounds
Sara Moore	Rachel Stevens	5	
Sarah Daly	Una Foden	5	
Sarah McTernan	Rachel Stevens	4	3rd place
Sarah Sylvia	Bressie	3	Live Shows
Sasha Sangari Smith	Bressie	4	Knockouts
Sean Byrne	Bressie	5	
Sean Sunderland	Dolores O'Riordan	3	Battle Rounds
Shane McLaughlin	Kian Egan	2	3rd place
Shannon Doyle	Rachel Stevens	4	Knockouts
Shannon Murphy	Bressie	2	4th place
Sharon Gaynor	Kian Egan	1	Live Shows
Shauna Nolan	Una Foden	4	Knockouts
Sinead Fox	Brian Kennedy	1	Live Shows
Sinead Hansard	Una Foden	4	Battle Rounds
Sinead O'Brien	Bressie	2	Top 10
Siobhan McKenna	Kian Egan	1	Battle Rounds
Sophie McDermott	Rachel Stevens	5	
Sophie Rischar	Jamelia	2	Live Shows
Stephanie Anketell	Rachel Stevens	5	
Stephen Griffin	Kian Egan	1	Battle Rounds
Stephen Hudson	Sharon Corr	2	Live Shows
Stuart Bond	Kian Egan	4	Battle Rounds
Tammy Browne	Sharon Corr	2	Live Shows
Tara Gannon	Rachel Stevens	4	Battle Rounds
Terri O'Reilly	Bressie	2	Live Shows
Thomas Kinney	Dolores O'Riordan	3	Battle Rounds
Tommy McNulty	Jamelia	2	Battle Rounds
Vanessa Whelan	Sharon Corr	1	3rd place
Velvin Lamont	Bressie	2	Live Shows
Wayne Beatty	Jamelia	2	Top 10

== Notes ==
A Originally from Kian Egan's team.
B Originally from Bressie's team.
C Originally from Dolores O'Riordan's team.
