= Brendan McCahey =

Irish singer-songwriter

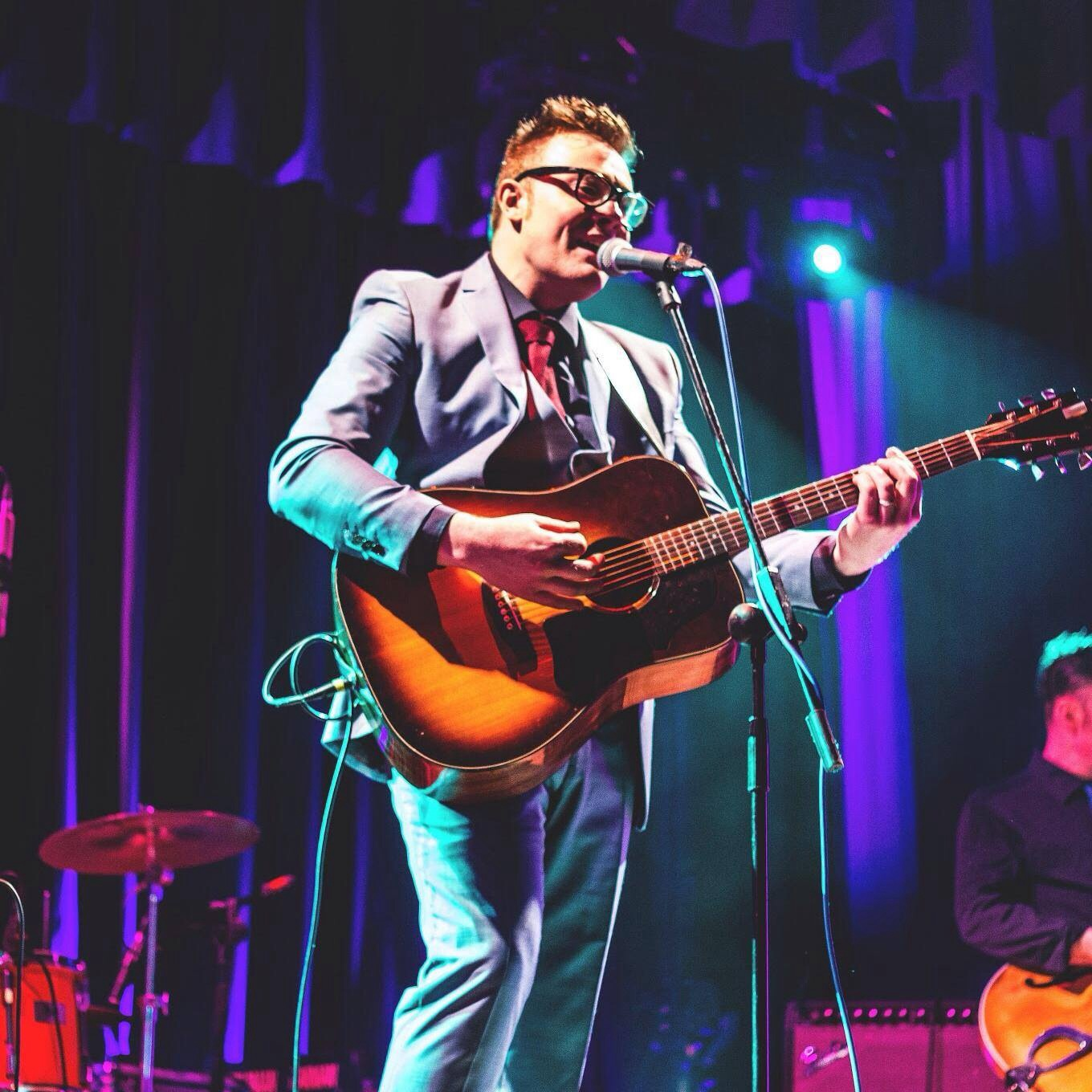
- McCahey in 2014

Background information
- Born: 1976 (age 49–50); Magheracloone, County Monaghan, Ireland
- Origin: Shercock, County Cavan, Ireland
- Genres: Pop, Rock, Indie
- Occupations: Singer, songwriter, musician, arranger, producer
- Instruments: Vocals, guitar, piano, drums, synthesizer, mandolin,
- Years active: 2010–present
- Label: Universal
- Website: www.brendanmccahey.com

Brendan McCahey is an Irish singer-songwriter and recording artist, who won the third series of The Voice of Ireland.

== Career ==
McCahey worked in a vintage guitar store. He had written and produced material prior to his appearance on The Voice of Ireland. In April 2014, he was crowned winner of series 3 of the talent competition The Voice of Ireland. He was mentored by former Blizzards frontman Bressie. He became the bookies' favourite to win top prize after receiving a score of 28 out of 30 from coaches Kian Egan, Dolores O'Riordan and Jamelia.

Following his victory, he released his debut single "You Can't Judge a Book by the Cover", originally sung by Bo Diddley. He released his debut solo album To Where I Begin on 14 November 2014, following its lead single Sweet Love, and toured. He promoted the song by performing on The Late Late Show on 31 October 2014, its release date. The album's second single Safe and Well was released on 10 April 2015. The song was promoted with a performance on The Voice of Ireland on 12 April 2015.

Brendan began work on his second studio album in early 2015, working with songwriters such as Don Mescall. Throughout 2015 he released numerous original songs to his SoundCloud account to coincide with his gigs in the UK & Ireland. However, a follow-up album to To Where I Begin was not officially released.

McCahey announced on 24 May 2016 via Instagram that a new EP titled Too Tight would be released towards the end of June. To coincide with this announcement, a demo of a song titled Guide You Through was released to his SoundCloud account. McCahey also announced that he would upload even more songs to iTunes that year. After much delay, the EP was released in June 2017.

Since the release of Too Tight, McCahey has released three albums: Let the Light Shine Through (2020), Krusty Sessions, Vol. 1 (2023), and Here Among the Signs (2025). He has also released three more EPs.

McCahey gigs as a solo artist and, from time to time, as part of his country group, The Goodgollys. He also continues to upload cover versions of his favourite songs to his SoundCloud account, while still creating original music in the background.

It was announced in January 2018 that McCahey was in the running to represent Ireland in the 2018 European Song Contest, competing against past winners Pat Byrne and Keith Hanley. He was not selected.

He currently resides in Shercock, County Cavan, and is married with children.

== Performances on The Voice of Ireland ==
Show	Song choice	Result
Blind Auditions	Starman	Joined Team Bressie
The Battle Round	Everytime You Go Away (Vs. Roel Villones)	Sent through to the live shows by Bressie
Live Show 1	You Can't Judge a Book by the Cover	Safe
Live Show 3	She's a Mystery to Me	Safe
Quarter-Final	For Once in My Life	Safe
Semi-final	Stay With Me	Through to Final
Final	You Can't Judge a Book by the Cover	Winner

== Discography ==
=== Singles ===
Year	Title	Peak chart positions
Year	Title	IRL
2014	"You Can't Judge a Book by the Cover"	15
2014	"Sweet Love"	90
2015	"Safe And Well"	—
2016	Baby I'm Crazy	
2017	Too Tight	
2017	Edge of the World	
2020	My Babe	
2023	Live at the Iontas	
2023	Silent Win	
2023	Time on My Hands	
2023	Proof of Love	
2023	Make It Mine	
2026	In Dreams	
2026	Chasing Lights	
2026	Becoming Me	

Year	Album title	Peak chart positions
Year	Album title	IRE
2014	To Where I Begin: Released: 14 November 2014; Label: Universal Music; Formats: CD, Digital download	20
2020	Let The Light Shine Through	
2023	Krusty Sessions, Vol. 1	
2025	Here Among the Signs	

Awards and achievements
Preceded by Keith Hanley	The Voice of Ireland; Winner; 2014	Succeeded by Patrick Donoghue
