= The Voice of Ireland series 2 =

The Voice of Ireland
- Series 2
- Coaches: Niall Breslin; Kian Egan; Sharon Corr; Jamelia
- Winner: Keith Hanley
- Winning coach: Jamelia
- Runner-up: Kelly Mongan

Release
- Original network: RTÉ One
- Original release: 6 January – 28 April 2013

Series chronology
- ← Previous; Series 1 Next → Series 3

The Voice of Ireland is an Irish reality talent show. The second series began airing on 6 January 2013 on RTÉ One. Bressie, Kian Egan and Sharon Corr return as coaches while Jamelia replaces Brian Kennedy, who left the show after the first series. This is the final series to feature Sharon Corr, who is being replaced by Dolores O'Riordan in the next series. Kathryn Thomas returns to present the main show, while Eoghan McDermott returns to co-present and Stephen Byrne covers the backstage V-Reporting. The winner of the second series was Keith Hanley from Team Jamelia.

Auditions for this series took place at the end of 2012. The Blind auditions took place on 21, 22, 23, 24 and 25 October at The Helix. A change this season is that of, if a coach has a full team of 12, they are still able to press their button and state their case as to why the artist should pick them. The Battle Rounds took place on 28 and 29 November at The Helix. The live shows began on 17 March 2013 with the final taking place on 28 April.

Keith Hanley, mentored by Jamelia, won the series, while Kelly Mongan coming second, Shane McLaughlin coming third and Shannon Murphy coming fourth.

== Teams ==
Color key

| Winner |
| Runner-up |
| Third place |
| Fourth place |
| Eliminated in the Live shows |
| Eliminated in the Battles |
| Withdrew |

| Coaches | Top 49 artists | | | | | | |
|---|---|---|---|---|---|---|---|
| Jamelia | | | | | | | |
| Jamelia | Sophie Rischar | Jennifer Moore | Roisín Carlin | Dylan Powell | Wayne Beatty | Keith Hanley | |
| Jamelia | Alexandra Miller | Tommy McNulty | Erica O'Hara | Ben Tighe | Barry Beatty | Niamh Armstrong | |
| Kian Egan | | | | | | | |
| Kian Egan | Daryl Phillips | Karl Sheridan | Andy Mac Unfraidh | Ray Scully | Shane McLaughlin | Kelly Mongan | |
| Kian Egan | Derek Power | Niamh O'Neill | Joey McAleer | Danielle Ward | Philip Kennedy | Jennifer Healy | |
| Sharon Corr | | | | | | | |
| Sharon Corr | Dean Anthony | Stephen Hudson | Mark Guildea | Tammy Browne | Aoife McLoughlin | John Gaughan | |
| Sharon Corr | Gerard McLoughlin | Ciara Cox | Gary Tighe | Bob McQuaid | Fiona McCourt | Jennifer Lyons | Mark McLaughlin |
| Bressie | | | | | | | |
| Bressie | Velvin Lamont | Terri O'Reilly | Andrew Mann | Sinead O'Brien | Katy Anna Mohan | Shannon Murphy | |
| Bressie | James Sheridan | Mairead Conlon | Eoin Dixon Murphy | David Merriman | Michelle Cunningham | Kirilee Dermot | |

== Blind Auditions ==
The Blind auditions took place on 21, 22, 23, 24 and 25 October at The Helix. The coaches choose teams of artists through a blind audition process. Each coach has the length of the artists' performance to decide if they want that artist on their team. Should two or more coaches want the same artist, then the artist gets to choose their coach. Once the coaches have picked their team, they are to pit them against each other in the ultimate sing off; The Battles. A change this season is that of, if a coach has a full team of 12, they are still able to press their button and state their case as to why the artist should pick them.

Color key

| ✔ | Coach hit his/her "I WANT YOU" button |
| | Artist defaulted to this coach's team |
| | Artist elected to join this coach's team |
| | Artist eliminated with no coach pressing his or her "I WANT YOU" button |

=== Blind Auditions 1 ===
| Order | Artist | Song | Coach's and contestant's choices | | | |
| Order | Artist | Song | Bressie | Sharon | Kian | Jamelia |
|---|---|---|---|---|---|---|
| 1 | Keith Hanley | "Listen" | ✔ | | | ✔ |
| 2 | Amy Cooney | "Wings" | | | | |
| 3 | Roisín Carlin | "Boyfriend" | ✔ | ✔ | ✔ | ✔ |
| 4 | Gary Tighe | "The Wayfaring Stranger" | | ✔ | | |
| 5 | Allison Saul Bracken | "Fallin'" | | | | |
| 6 | Dylan Powell | "The House of the Rising Sun" | | | ✔ | ✔ |
| 7 | Fiona McCourt | "Black and Gold" | | ✔ | | |
| 8 | Joey McAleer | "I Still Haven't Found What I'm Looking For" | | | ✔ | |
| 9 | Sharon Osigwe | "Band of Gold" | | | | |
| 10 | Eimear Bradley | "Black Heart" | | | | |
| 11 | Mark Guildea | "Living for the City" | | ✔ | ✔ | |
| 12 | Michelle Cunningham | "Read All About It (Part III)" | ✔ | | ✔ | |
| 13 | Sinead O'Brien | "Rumour Has It" | ✔ | ✔ | ✔ | ✔ |

=== Blind Auditions 2 ===
| Order | Artist | Song | Coach's and contestant's choices | | | |
| Order | Artist | Song | Bressie | Sharon | Kian | Jamelia |
|---|---|---|---|---|---|---|
| 1 | Gerard McLoughlin | "So Sick" | | ✔ | | |
| 2 | Michael Barayuga | "Billionaire" | | | | |
| 3 | Wayne Beatty | "Wonderful World" | | ✔ | ✔ | ✔ |
| 4 | Barry Beatty | "Ordinary People" | | ✔ | | ✔ |
| 5 | Aaron Deery | "When Love Takes Over" | | | | |
| 6 | Ciara Cox | "Cowboy Casanova" | | ✔ | | |
| 7 | Eimear Sheridan | "Promise This" | | | | |
| 8 | Mairead Conlon | "In the Ghetto" | ✔ | ✔ | | |
| 9 | Jonny Warren | "Dancing in the Dark" | | | | |
| 10 | Terri O'Reilly | "Diamonds" | ✔ | ✔ | ✔ | ✔ |
| 11 | Ray Scully | "It's a Man's Man's Man's World" | | | ✔ | |
| 12 | Kiera Dignam | "Don't Let Go (Love)" | | | | |
| 13 | Jennifer Healy | "I'll Be There" | | | ✔ | |

=== Blind Auditions 3 ===
| Order | Artist | Song | Coach's and contestant's choices | | | |
| Order | Artist | Song | Bressie | Sharon | Kian | Jamelia |
|---|---|---|---|---|---|---|
| 1 | Ben Tighe | "California Gurls" | | | | ✔ |
| 2 | Niamh Collins | "You Oughta Know" | | | | |
| 3 | Andrew Mann | "Payphone" | ✔ | ✔ | ✔ | ✔ |
| 4 | Roger Boyd | "Blaze of Glory" | | | | |
| 5 | Kelly Mongan | "I Have Nothing" | | | ✔ | |
| 6 | Jennifer Lyons | "Skyscraper" | | ✔ | ✔ | |
| 7 | Tina Mulrooney | "All I Want Is You" | | | | |
| 8 | Siobhan McKenna | "Firework" | | | | |
| 9 | Shane McLaughlin | "Fake" | | | ✔ | |
| 10 | Eoin Dixon Murphy | "Grenade" | ✔ | ✔ | | |
| 11 | Darragh McGann | "Too Late for Hallelujah" | | | | |
| 12 | Aoife McLoughlin | "Bang Bang (My Baby Shot Me Down)" | | ✔ | ✔ | ✔ |
| 13 | Karl Sheridan | "The Blower's Daughter" | | ✔ | ✔ | |

=== Blind Auditions 4 ===
| Order | Artist | Song | Coach's and contestant's choices | | | |
| Order | Artist | Song | Bressie | Sharon | Kian | Jamelia |
|---|---|---|---|---|---|---|
| 1 | Andy Mac Unfraidh | "Somebody That I Used to Know" | | | ✔ | |
| 2 | Jennifer Fada Musa | "How We Do (Party)" | | | | |
| 3 | Bob McQuaid | "You Don't Know Me" | | ✔ | ✔ | |
| 4 | Gina McNulty | "Stronger (What Doesn't Kill You)" | | | | |
| 5 | Mark McLaughlin | "Free Fallin'" | | ✔ | ✔ | |
| 6 | Tommy McNulty | "Blue Skies" (original song) | | | | ✔ |
| 7 | Kirilee Dermot | "I'd Rather Go Blind" | ✔ | | ✔ | ✔ |
| 8 | Tolu Olatoye | "Halo" | | | | |
| 9 | Niamh O'Neill | "I Wish I Was a Punk Rocker (With Flowers in My Hair)" | | | ✔ | |
| 10 | Thomas Kane-Byrne | "Picking Up the Pieces" | | | | |
| 11 | David Merriman | "Wicked Games" | ✔ | ✔ | ✔ | ✔ |
| 12 | Peter Smith | "High and Dry" | | | | |
| 13 | Niamh Armstrong | "I Wish I Knew How It Would Feel to Be Free" | | | | ✔ |

=== Blind Auditions 5 ===
| Order | Artist | Song | Coach's and contestant's choices | | | |
| Order | Artist | Song | Bressie | Sharon | Kian | Jamelia |
|---|---|---|---|---|---|---|
| 1 | John Gaughan | "Someone like You" | | ✔ | ✔ | ✔ |
| 2 | Jasmine Kavanagh | "Blue Jeans" | | | | |
| 3 | Alexandra Miller | "Skyfall" | ✔ | ✔ | ✔ | ✔ |
| 4 | Caithlin Mogatedi James | "I'm Going Down" | | | | |
| 5 | Philip Kennedy | "We Are Young" | | | ✔ | |
| 6 | Beena Day | "Man in the Mirror" | | | | |
| 7 | Velvin Lamont | "Signed, Sealed, Delivered I'm Yours" | ✔ | | ✔ | |
| 8 | Derek Power | "Where the Streets Have No Name" | | | ✔ | |
| 9 | Jack Patrick Healy | "Mr. Bojangles" | | | | |
| 10 | Jennifer Moore | "Suitcase" | | | | ✔ |
| 11 | Patrick Lacken | "Hero" | | | | |
| 12 | Dean Anthony | "Red" | | ✔ | | ✔ |
| 13 | Sophie Rischar | "Love on Top" | ✔ | ✔ | | ✔ |

=== Blind Auditions 6 ===
| Order | Artist | Song | Coach's and contestant's choices | | | |
| Order | Artist | Song | Bressie | Sharon | Kian | Jamelia |
|---|---|---|---|---|---|---|
| 1 | James Sheridan | "The Cave" | ✔ | | | |
| 2 | Alice Norwood | "I Need a Dollar" | | | | |
| 3 | Danielle Ward | "Last Request" | | ✔ | ✔ | |
| 4 | Jim Quinn | "Jack & Diane" | | | | |
| 5 | Keith Doherty | "Call Me Maybe" | | | | |
| 6 | Shannon Murphy | "We Are Never Ever Getting Back Together" | ✔ | ✔ | ✔ | |
| 7 | Dean Forrester | "Unforgettable" | | | | |
| 8 | Erica O'Hara | "Skinny Love" | | | | ✔ |
| 9 | Katy Anna Mohan | "Spectrum (Say My Name)" | ✔ | ✔ | ✔ | ✔ |
| 10 | Stephen Hudson | "Heart of Gold" | | ✔ | ✔ | ✔ |
| 11 | Tammy Browne | "Alone" | | ✔ | ✔ | |
| 12 | Daryl Phillips | "Drunk" | | | ✔ | |

== Battles ==
The Battle Rounds took place on 28 and 29 November at The Helix. Each coach's artists performed at The Helix for The Battle Rounds. Each team of artists were mentored and developed by their coach. In this stage, two artists from the same team, battle against each other by singing the same song, with the coach choosing which artist to send through to the live shows.

Color key

| Artist won the Battle and advances to the Live shows |
| Artist lost the Battle and was eliminated |
| Artist withdrew from the competition |

| Coach | Adviser | Artists | | | | | | |
|---|---|---|---|---|---|---|---|---|
| Bressie | Jerry Fish | David Merriman | James Sheridan | Andrew Mann | Kirilee Dermot | Katy Anna Mohan | | Mairead Conlon |
| Bressie | Jerry Fish | Sinead O'Brien | Velvin Lamont | Eoin Dixon Murphy | Shannon Murphy | Michelle Cunningham | | Terri O'Reilly |
| Sharon Corr | Paul Walsh | Bob McQuaid | Ciara Cox | Dean Anthony | Aoife McLoughlin | John Gaughan | | Gary Tighe |
| Sharon Corr | Paul Walsh | Tammy Browne | Stephen Hudson | Gerard McLoughlin | Fiona McCourt | Jennifer Lyons | Mark McLaughlin | Mark Guildea |
| Kian Egan | Danny Jones | Jennifer Healy | Andy Mac Unfraidh | Karl Sheridan | Daryl Phillips | Danielle Ward | | Philip Kennedy |
| Kian Egan | Danny Jones | Kelly Mongan | Joey McAleer | Niamh O'Neill | Derek Power | Ray Scully | | Shane McLaughlin |
| Jamelia | Lemar | Erica O'Hara | Keith Hanley | Ben Tighe | Jennifer Moore | Alexandra Miller | | Barry Beatty |
| Jamelia | Lemar | Roisín Carlin | Niamh Armstrong | Dylan Powell | Tommy McNulty | Sophie Rischar | | Wayne Beatty |

=== Battles 1 ===
| Order | Coach | Winner | Song | Loser |
|---|---|---|---|---|
| 1 | Jamelia | Roisín Carlin | "Seven Nation Army" | Erica O'Hara |
| 2 | Sharon Corr | Tammy Browne | "Summer Wine" | Bob McQuaid |
| 3 | Kian Egan | Kelly Mongan | "Breakaway" | Jennifer Healy |
| 4 | Bressie | Sinead O'Brien | "Little Talks" | David Merriman |
| 5 | Kian Egan | Andy Mac Unfraidh | "Somewhere Only We Know" | Joey McAleer |
| 6 | Bressie | Velvin Lamont | "Fortunate Son" | James Sheridan |

=== Battles 2 ===
| Order | Coach | Winner | Song | Loser |
|---|---|---|---|---|
| 1 | Bressie | Andrew Mann | "Push" | Eoin Dixon Murphy |
| 2 | Sharon Corr | Stephen Hudson | "Broken Strings" | Ciara Cox |
| 3 | Kian Egan | Karl Sheridan | "When You're Gone" | Niamh O'Neill |
| 4 | Bressie | Shannon Murphy | "Mandinka" | Kirilee Dermot |
| 5 | Sharon Corr | Dean Anthony | "Freedom! '90" | Gerard McLoughlin |
| 6 | Jamelia | Keith Hanley | "Beneath Your Beautiful" | Niamh Armstrong |

=== Battles 3 ===
Mark McLaughlin from Team Sharon withdrew from the competition due to an injury which left him incapable of singing. He and battle partner John Gaughan's original song choice was Foster the People's "Pumped Up Kicks". This left a vacancy for Sharon's tri-pairing which were Jennifer Lyons, Fiona McCourt and Aoife McLoughlin. It was then revealed that Lyons would replace McLaughlin and battle Gaughan. The song choice was changed to Bruno Mars' "Marry You".

| Order | Coach | Winner | Song | Loser | |
|---|---|---|---|---|---|
| 1 | Jamelia | Dylan Powell | "Numb" | Ben Tighe | |
| 2 | Sharon Corr | Aoife McLoughlin | "The Promise" | Fiona McCourt | |
| 3 | Bressie | Katy Anna Mohan | "Fall at Your Feet" | Michelle Cunningham | |
| 4 | Kian Egan | Daryl Phillips | "God Put a Smile upon Your Face" | Derek Power | |
| 5 | Sharon Corr | John Gaughan | "Marry You" | Jennifer Lyons | Mark McLaughlin |
| 6 | Jamelia | Jennifer Moore | "Can't Fight the Moonlight" | Tommy McNulty | |

=== Battles 4 ===
| Order | Coach | Winner | Song | Loser |
|---|---|---|---|---|
| 1 | Jamelia | Sophie Rischar | "Only Girl (In the World)" | Alexandra Miller |
| 2 | Sharon Corr | Mark Guildea | "Gimme Some Lovin'" | Gary Tighe |
| 3 | Kian Egan | Ray Scully | "Bring Me to Life" | Danielle Ward |
| 4 | Bressie | Terri O'Reilly | "Ordinary World" | Mairead Conlon |
| 5 | Kian Egan | Shane McLaughlin | "Drive By" | Philip Kennedy |
| 6 | Jamelia | Wayne Beatty | "The Boy Is Mine" | Barry Beatty |

== Live shows ==
The live shows began on 17 March 2013. The remaining artists competed against each other in live TV broadcasts at The Helix, with the viewers helping decide who advances and who exits the competition. When the top 10 artists remain, the artists will compete against each other hoping to make it to the finale on 28 April. The winner of the show will become The Voice of Ireland and get offered a contract with Universal Music worth €100,000.

=== Results summary ===
Color keys
Artist's info

| Artist from Team Bressie |
| Artist from Team Jamelia |
| Artist from Team Sharon |
| Artist from Team Kian |

Result details

| Winner |
| Runner-up |
| Third place |
| Fourth place |
| Artist advanced to the finals |

| Artist was saved by the public |
| Artist was saved as a wildcard |
| Artist was in the bottom two |
| Artist received the fewest of the public's vote and was eliminated |
| Artist did not perform on that particular week |

| Artist | Week 1 | Week 2 | Week 3 | Week 4 | Top 10 | Semi-Final | Final |
|---|---|---|---|---|---|---|---|
| Keith Hanley | | Safe | | Safe | Safe | Safe | Winner |
| Kelly Mongan | | Safe | | Safe | Safe | Safe | Runner-up |
| Shane McLaughlin | Safe | | | Wildcard | Safe | Safe | Third place |
| Shannon Murphy | Safe | | Wildcard | | Safe | Safe | Fourth place |
| John Gaughan | | Bottom two | Safe | | Safe | Eliminated | Eliminated (Semi-final) |
| Katy Anna Mohan | Bottom two | | | Safe | Safe | Eliminated | Eliminated (Semi-final) |
| Wayne Beatty | | Bottom two | Safe | | Eliminated | Eliminated (Top 10) | |
| Ray Scully | | Bottom two | Safe | | Eliminated | Eliminated (Top 10) | |
| Aoife McLoughlin | Safe | | | Safe | Eliminated | Eliminated (Top 10) | |
| Sinead O'Brien | | Safe | Safe | | Eliminated | Eliminated (Top 10) | |
| Dylan Powell | Bottom two | | | Eliminated | Eliminated (Week 4) | | |
| Tammy Browne | | Safe | | Eliminated | Eliminated (Week 4) | | |
| Andrew Mann | | Bressie's choice | | Eliminated | Eliminated (Week 4) | | |
| Roisín Carlin | Safe | | Eliminated | Eliminated (Week 3) | | | |
| Andy Mac Unfraidh | Bottom two | | Eliminated | Eliminated (Week 3) | | | |
| Mark Guildea | Bottom two | | Eliminated | Eliminated (Week 3) | | | |
| Jennifer Moore | | Eliminated | Eliminated (Week 2) | | | | |
| Karl Sheridan | | Eliminated | Eliminated (Week 2) | | | | |
| Stephen Hudson | | Eliminated | Eliminated (Week 2) | | | | |
| Terri O'Reilly | | Eliminated | Eliminated (Week 2) | | | | |
| Sophie Rischar | Eliminated | Eliminated (Week 1) | | | | | |
| Daryl Phillips | Eliminated | Eliminated (Week 1) | | | | | |
| Dean Anthony | Eliminated | Eliminated (Week 1) | | | | | |
| Velvin Lamont | Eliminated | Eliminated (Week 1) | | | | | |

=== Live show details ===
Color key

| Artist was saved by the public's vote |
| Artist was part of the bottom two in his/her team and saved by his/her coach |
| Artist was saved by the public vote as a wildcard |
| Artist was eliminated |

==== Live Show 1 (17 March) ====
- Coaches performance: "Teenage Kicks"
- Guest performer: Pat Byrne ("All or Nothing")

Artists' performances on the first live show
| Order | Coach | Artist | Song | Coaches' scores | | | | | Result |
| Order | Coach | Artist | Song | Bressie | Sharon | Kian | Jamelia | Total | Result |
|---|---|---|---|---|---|---|---|---|---|
| 1 | Jamelia | Roisín Carlin | "I Knew You Were Trouble" | 6 | 7 | 6 | 8 | 27 | Safe |
| 2 | Jamelia | Sophie Rischar | "(You Make Me Feel Like) A Natural Woman" | 8 | 6 | 7 | 9 | 30 | Eliminated |
| 3 | Jamelia | Dylan Powell | "(Sittin' On) The Dock of the Bay" | 6 | 6 | 7 | 8 | 27 | Jamelia's choice |
| 4 | Kian Egan | Shane McLaughlin | "Mr. Brightside" | 6 | 6 | 7 | 7 | 26 | Safe |
| 5 | Kian Egan | Daryl Phillips | "I Won't Give Up" | 8 | 7 | 7 | 5 | 27 | Eliminated |
| 6 | Kian Egan | Andy Mac Unfraidh | "Umbrella" | 7 | 8 | 8 | 8 | 31 | Kian's choice |
| 7 | Bressie | Velvin Lamont | "Jealous Guy" | 8 | 6 | 6 | 8 | 28 | Eliminated |
| 8 | Bressie | Katy Anna Mohan | "Enjoy the Silence" | 8 | 7 | 7 | 8 | 30 | Bressie's choice |
| 9 | Bressie | Shannon Murphy | "Ho Hey" | 9 | 8 | 8 | 8 | 33 | Safe |
| 10 | Sharon Corr | Dean Anthony | "With You" | 8 | 8 | 6 | 6 | 28 | Eliminated |
| 11 | Sharon Corr | Aoife McLoughlin | "Stay" | 7 | 8 | 8 | 7 | 30 | Safe |
| 12 | Sharon Corr | Mark Guildea | "Dude (Looks Like a Lady)" | 8 | 9 | 7 | 7 | 31 | Sharon's choice |

- Three artists from each team performed with one from each team being eliminated
  - Each coach rated each artists performance out of ten
  - The public vote was combined with the coaches' scores
  - The artist from each team with the highest combined total was sent through to the next round
  - Each coach sent a second artist from their own team through to the next round

==== Live Show 2 (24 March) ====
- Guest performer: Lawson ("Learn to Love Again")

Artists' performances on the second live show
| Order | Coach | Artist | Song | Coaches' scores | | | | | Result |
| Order | Coach | Artist | Song | Bressie | Sharon | Kian | Jamelia | Total | Result |
|---|---|---|---|---|---|---|---|---|---|
| 1 | Jamelia | Wayne Beatty | "Locked Out of Heaven" | 9 | 8 | 8 | 8 | 33 | Jamelia's choice |
| 2 | Jamelia | Jennifer Moore | "The Climb" | 7 | 7 | 8 | 8 | 30 | Eliminated |
| 3 | Jamelia | Keith Hanley | "Beggin'" | 10 | 9 | 9 | 10 | 38 | Safe |
| 4 | Kian Egan | Ray Scully | "Trouble" | 7 | 7 | 8 | 8 | 30 | Kian's choice |
| 5 | Kian Egan | Kelly Mongan | "A Moment Like This" | 7 | 7 | 8 | 7 | 29 | Safe |
| 6 | Kian Egan | Karl Sheridan | "Summertime" | 9 | 9 | 8 | 8 | 34 | Eliminated |
| 7 | Sharon Corr | John Gaughan | "Too Close" | 8 | 9 | 7 | 8 | 32 | Sharon's choice |
| 8 | Sharon Corr | Tammy Browne | "Unfaithful" | 7 | 8 | 7 | 7 | 29 | Safe |
| 9 | Sharon Corr | Stephen Hudson | "She's So High" | 8 | 9 | 7 | 8 | 32 | Eliminated |
| 10 | Bressie | Terri O'Reilly | "Shining Light" | 8 | 7 | 8 | 8 | 31 | Eliminated |
| 11 | Bressie | Sinead O'Brien | "Moon River" | 7 | 6 | 7 | 6 | 26 | Safe |
| 12 | Bressie | Andrew Mann | "Are You Gonna Go My Way" | 9 | 8 | 8 | 9 | 34 | Bressie's choice |

- Three artists from each team performed with one from each team being eliminated
  - Each coach rated each artists performance out of ten
  - The public vote was combined with the coaches' scores
  - The artist from each team with the highest combined total was sent through to the next round
  - Each coach sent a second artist from their own team through to the next round

==== Live Show 3 (31 March) ====
- Guest performer: Bressie ("Show Me Love")
- Team performance: Jamelia and Team Jamelia ("Anything Could Happen")

Artists' performances on the third live show
| Order | Coach | Artist | Song | Coaches' scores | | | | | Result |
| Order | Coach | Artist | Song | Bressie | Sharon | Kian | Jamelia | Total | Result |
|---|---|---|---|---|---|---|---|---|---|
| 1 | Bressie | Shannon Murphy | "You Shook Me All Night Long" | | 6 | 7 | 7 | 20 | Wildcard vote |
| 2 | Bressie | Sinead O'Brien | "Let Her Go" | | 5 | 6 | 6 | 17 | Through to Top 10 |
| 3 | Sharon Corr | John Gaughan | "Lightning Bolt" | 6 | | 6 | 7 | 19 | Through to Top 10 |
| 4 | Sharon Corr | Mark Guildea | "Army of Two" | 5 | | 5 | 5 | 15 | Eliminated |
| 5 | Kian Egan | Andy Mac Unfraidh | "Dream On" | 7 | 8 | | 8 | 23 | Eliminated |
| 6 | Kian Egan | Ray Scully | "Teardrop" | 9 | 8 | | 9 | 26 | Through to Top 10 |
| 7 | Jamelia | Roisín Carlin | "Tears Dry on Their Own" | 6 | 5 | 5 | | 16 | Eliminated |
| 8 | Jamelia | Wayne Beatty | "Closer" | 8 | 8 | 8 | | 24 | Through to Top 10 |

- Two artists performed on each team with one from each team being immediately sent through to the Top 10
  - Each artists' performance was rated out of ten by the three opposing coaches
  - The coaches did not rate their own artists
  - The coaches' scores were combined with the public vote
  - The artist in each team with the highest combined total were saved
- Of the remaining four artists, one more was sent through to the Top 10 on a Wildcard
  - The artist with the highest combined total was saved

==== Live Show 4 (7 April) ====
- Guest performer: McFly ("Shine a Light" and "Love Is Easy")
- Team performance: Kian Egan and Team Kian ("Are You Gonna Be My Girl")

Artists' performances on the third live show
| Order | Coach | Artist | Song | Coaches' scores | | | | | Result |
| Order | Coach | Artist | Song | Bressie | Sharon | Kian | Jamelia | Total | Result |
|---|---|---|---|---|---|---|---|---|---|
| 1 | Sharon Corr | Tammy Browne | "I Kissed a Girl" | 6 | | 6 | 7 | 19 | Eliminated |
| 2 | Sharon Corr | Aoife McLoughlin | "Girl on Fire" | 7 | | 8 | 7 | 22 | Through to Top 10 |
| 3 | Bressie | Andrew Mann | "Never Tear Us Apart" | | 9 | 7 | 7 | 23 | Eliminated |
| 4 | Bressie | Katy Anna Mohan | "Starlight" | | 6 | 8 | 8 | 22 | Through to Top 10 |
| 5 | Kian Egan | Shane McLaughlin | "Valerie" | 7 | 6 | | 6 | 19 | Wildcard vote |
| 6 | Kian Egan | Kelly Mongan | "Sorry Seems to Be the Hardest Word" | 8 | 8 | | 9 | 25 | Through to Top 10 |
| 7 | Jamelia | Dylan Powell | "Pompeii" | 5 | 5 | 6 | | 16 | Eliminated |
| 8 | Jamelia | Keith Hanley | "Shackles (Praise You)" | 9 | 8 | 8 | | 25 | Through to Top 10 |

- Two artists performed on each team with one from each team being immediately sent through to the Top 10
  - Each artists' performance was rated out of ten by the three opposing coaches
  - The coaches did not rate their own artists
  - The coaches' scores were combined with the public vote
  - The artist in each team with the highest combined total were saved
- Of the remaining four artists, one more was sent through to the Top 10 on a Wildcard
  - The artist with the highest combined total was saved

==== Top 10 (14 April) ====
- Guest performers: Stooshe ("Slip") and Jamelia ("Thank You/Superstar")
- Team performance: Sharon Corr and Team Sharon ("Hall of Fame")

Artists' performances on the first live show
| Order | Coach | Artist | Song | Coaches' scores | | | | | Result |
| Order | Coach | Artist | Song | Bressie | Sharon | Kian | Jamelia | Total | Result |
|---|---|---|---|---|---|---|---|---|---|
| 1 | Kian Egan | Ray Scully | "I Will Wait" | 7 | 7 | | 8 | 22 | Eliminated |
| 2 | Kian Egan | Kelly Mongan | "Clown" | 8 | 8 | | 8 | 24 | Safe |
| 3 | Kian Egan | Shane McLaughlin | "Wherever You Will Go" | 6 | 6 | | 5 | 17 | Safe |
| 4 | Sharon Corr | Aoife McLoughlin | "Paint It, Black" | 6 | | 6 | 8 | 20 | Eliminated |
| 5 | Sharon Corr | John Gaughan | "When I Was Your Man" | 10 | | 9 | 9 | 28 | Safe |
| 6 | Jamelia | Wayne Beatty | "Take a Bow" | 8 | 7 | 7 | | 22 | Eliminated |
| 7 | Jamelia | Keith Hanley | "Get Here" | 8 | 7 | 8 | | 23 | Safe |
| 8 | Bressie | Shannon Murphy | "Try" | | 7 | 7 | 7 | 21 | Safe |
| 9 | Bressie | Katy Anna Mohan | "You Made Me the Thief of Your Heart" | | 8 | 8 | 8 | 24 | Safe |
| 10 | Bressie | Sinead O'Brien | "Reach Out I'll Be There" | | 7 | 7 | 8 | 22 | Eliminated |

- Each artist was scored by their three opposing coaches out of ten.
- The coaches' scores were then combined with the public vote.
- The four artists with the lowest combined total (irrespective of which team they were part of) were eliminated.

==== Semi-final (21 April) ====
- Coaches performance: "Let's Dance"
- Guest performers: The Coronas ("Closer to You" and "Dreaming Again") and Sharon Corr ("We Could Be Lovers")
- Team performance: Bressie and Team Bressie ("Caravan of Love")

Artists' performances on the Semi-final live show
| Order | Coach | Artist | Song | Coaches' scores | | | | | Result |
| Order | Coach | Artist | Song | Bressie | Sharon | Kian | Jamelia | Total | Result |
|---|---|---|---|---|---|---|---|---|---|
| 1 | Kian Egan | Shane McLaughlin | "Pour Some Sugar on Me" | 8 | 8 | | 6 | 22 | Safe |
| 2 | Bressie | Shannon Murphy | "High Hopes" | | 8 | 9 | 7 | 24 | Safe |
| 3 | Bressie | Katy Anna Mohan | "She Wolf (Falling to Pieces)" | | 8 | 8 | 8 | 24 | Eliminated |
| 4 | Kian Egan | Kelly Mongan | "Angel" | 7 | 6 | | 7 | 20 | Safe |
| 5 | Sharon Corr | John Gaughan | "Cannonball" | 8 | | 7 | 8 | 23 | Eliminated |
| 6 | Jamelia | Keith Hanley | "Crazy" | 8 | 7 | 7 | | 22 | Safe |

==== Final (28 April) ====
- Finalists performance: "Good Time"
- Guest performer: The Saturdays ("Issues" and "What About Us")

Artists' performances on the final
| Order | Coach | Artist | First song | Second song | Result |
|---|---|---|---|---|---|
| 1 | Bressie | Shannon Murphy | "We Should Be Lovers" (with Paul Walsh) | "Ho Hey" | Fourth place |
| 2 | Kian Egan | Kelly Mongan | "Perfect" (with Una Healy) | "Sorry Seems to Be the Hardest Word" | Runner-up |
| 3 | Kian Egan | Shane McLaughlin | "Brewing Up a Storm" (with Steve Wall) | "Fake" | Third place |
| 4 | Jamelia | Keith Hanley | "Jigsaw" (with Ryan Sheridan) | "Beggin'" | Winner |

== Ratings ==
| # | Episode | Air date | Official RTÉ One rating |
|---|---|---|---|
| 1 | Blind Auditions 1 | 6 January 2013 | 605,000 |
| 2 | Blind Auditions 2 | 13 January 2013 | 660,000 |
| 3 | Blind Auditions 3 | 20 January 2013 | 729,000 |
| 4 | Blind Auditions 4 | 27 January 2013 | 677,000 |
| 5 | Blind Auditions 5 | 3 February 2013 | — |
| 6 | Blind Auditions 6 | 10 February 2013 | 714,000 |
| 7 | The Battles 1 | 17 February 2013 | 742,700 |
| 8 | The Battles 2 | 24 February 2013 | 639,000 |
| 9 | The Battles 3 | 3 March 2013 | 697,000 |
| 10 | The Battles 4 | 10 March 2013 | — |
| 11 | Live Show 1 | 17 March 2013 | — |
| 12 | Live Show 2 | 24 March 2013 | — |
| 13 | Live Show 3 | 31 March 2013 | — |
| 14 | Live Show 4 | 7 April 2013 | 608,000 |
| 15 | Live Show 5 | 14 April 2013 | — |
| 16 | Semi-final | 21 April 2013 | — |
| 17 | Final | 28 April 2013 | — |
