= The Voice of Ireland series 3 =

The Voice of Ireland
- Series 3
- Coaches: Niall Breslin; Kian Egan; Jamelia; Dolores O'Riordan
- Winner: Brendan McCahey
- Winning coach: Bressie
- Runner-up: Kellie Lewis

Release
- Original network: RTÉ One
- Original release: 5 January – 27 April 2014

Series chronology
- ← Previous; Series 2 Next → Series 4

The Voice of Ireland is an Irish reality talent show. The third series began airing on 5 January 2014 on RTÉ One. Kathryn Thomas presents the main show, while Eoghan McDermott co-presents. Bressie, Kian Egan and Jamelia returned as coaches while Dolores O'Riordan replaced Sharon Corr who left after the second series. The first episode aired on 5 January. After the show Jamelia and Dolores quit and were replaced by Una Foden/Healy and Rachel Stevens The Blind auditions took place on 18, 19 and 20 October at The Helix. An addition this season is that RTÉ 2fm have selected 5 wildcards to audition.

Cavan singer and guitarist Brendan McCahey was crowned the 2014 Voice of Ireland on 28 April 2014. He was victorious with his version and now single You Can't Judge a Book by the Cover. He was coached by Bressie and performed with Jerry Fish in the final.

== Teams ==
Color key

Winner
Runner-up
Third place
Fourth place
Eliminated in the Live shows
Artist was stolen by another coach (Name is strikethroughed)
Eliminated in the Battles
Artist withdrew from the competition

Coaches	Top 41 artists					
Jamelia						
Jamelia	Laura May Lenehan	Gavin Murray	Aisling Connolly	Remy Naidoo	Martin McInerney	Daisy Valenzuela
Jamelia	Catherine Hughes	Leah McConnell	Kelly Hannon	Emma Collins	Malachy Gaughan	
Kian Egan						
Kian Egan	Jay Boland	Paddy Molloy	Danica Holland	Laura O'Connor	Craig McMorrow	Pauric McLaughlin
Kian Egan	~~Aisling Connolly~~	Dagan Vickers	Daragh Kiely	Jamie Hartigan	Christopher Stoodley	
Dolores O'Riordan						
Dolores O'Riordan	Kellie Lewis	Mariah Butler	Michelle Revins	Emma Walsh	Peter Whitford	John Hogan
Dolores O'Riordan	~~Pauric McLaughlin~~	Thomas Kinney	Anna O'Hanlon	Sean Sunderland	~~Jamie Stanton~~	Nella Dwyer
Bressie						
Bressie	Brendan McCahey	Jamie Stanton	Sarah Sylvia	Ciara Donnelly	Pádraig Byrne	Kedar Friis-Lawrence
Bressie	Roel Villones	Caoin Fitzpatrick	Heather Stuart	~~Emma Walsh~~	Paddy Reilly	

== Blind Auditions ==
The Blind auditions took place on 18, 19 and 20 October at The Helix. The coaches choose teams of artists through a blind audition process. Each coach has the length of the artists' performance to decide if they want that artist on their team. Should two or more coaches want the same artist, then the artist gets to choose their coach. This series, each coach gets to pick ten artists to join their team. Once the coaches have picked their team, they are to pit them against each other in the ultimate sing off; The Battles. An addition this season is that RTÉ 2fm have selected 5 wildcards to audition.

Color key

✔	Coach hit his/her "I WANT YOU" button
	Artist defaulted to this coach's team
	Artist elected to join this coach's team
	Artist eliminated with no coach pressing his or her "I WANT YOU" button

=== Blind Auditions 1 ===
Order	Artist	Song	Coach's and contestant's choices			
Order	Artist	Song	Bressie	Dolores	Kian	Jamelia
1	Gavin Murray	"Cheating"			✔	✔
2	Ruth Mac Sweeney	"Turn My Swag On"				
3	Danica Holland	"Do It like a Dude"			✔	✔
4	Kellie Lewis	"Running Up That Hill"		✔	✔	✔
5	Thomas Kinney	"Can't Help Falling in Love"		✔	✔	
6	Sharon Osigwe	"I Heard It Through the Grapevine"				
7	Lynette Rooney	"Redneck Woman"				
8	Caoin Fitzpatrick	"Made of Stone"	✔	✔	✔	
9	Jay Boland	"All I Want"	✔	✔	✔	✔
10	Davina Brady	"Piece of My Heart"				
11	Sean Sunderland	"Express Yourself"		✔	✔	

=== Blind Auditions 2 ===
Order	Artist	Song	Coach's and contestant's choices			
Order	Artist	Song	Bressie	Dolores	Kian	Jamelia
1	Pauric McLaughlin	"Feel So Close"		✔	✔	✔
2	Kelly Hannon	"Don't You Worry Child"				✔
3	Michéal Kavanagh	"You Make It Real"				
4	Jamie Hartigan	"RIP Thomas"			✔	
5	Cassandra McElligott	"The Only Exception"				
6	Kedar Friis-Lawrence	"Don't Look Back in Anger"	✔			✔
7	Jacob Cheikh	"At Last"				
8	Dagan Vickers	"Love Me Again"			✔	
9	Mariah Butler	"Before He Cheats"		✔		✔
10	Chantelle McNulty	"So Good to Me"				
11	Rachael Farrell	"Lifted"				
12	Ciara Donnelly	"Lonely Boy"	✔		✔	✔

=== Blind Auditions 3 ===
Order	Artist	Song	Coach's and contestant's choices			
Order	Artist	Song	Bressie	Dolores	Kian	Jamelia
1	Roel Villones	"Nella Fantasia"	✔			
2	Kayla Kehoe	"Royals"				
3	Aisling Connolly	"Cloudbusting"			✔	
4	James Sheridan	"TiK ToK"				
5	Áine Finlay	"You da One"				
6	Heather Stuart	"Red"	✔			
7	Catherine Hughes	"Blown Away"				✔
8	Keith Tormay	"Hard to Handle"				
9	John Hogan	"Little Boy Blue"	✔	✔	✔	✔
10	Emma Collins	"Touch the Sky"				✔
11	Siobhan McNamara	"We Can't Stop"				
12	Michelle Revins	"Hurt"		✔	✔	

=== Blind Auditions 4 ===
Order	Artist	Song	Coach's and contestant's choices			
Order	Artist	Song	Bressie	Dolores	Kian	Jamelia
1	Remy Naidoo	"Feel So Close"				✔
2	Dylan Brickley	"You Need Me, I Don't Need You"				
3	Martin McInerney	"Mercy"		✔	✔	✔
4	Aoife Byrne	"It's Time"				
5	Christopher Stoodley	"Home and Away"			✔	
6	Aoibheann O'Brien	"You Had Me"				
7	Pádraig Byrne	"Let's Get It On"	✔		✔	✔
8	Alison Rushe	"Backtrack"				
9	Jamie Stanton	"Gold on the Ceiling"		✔		
10	Malachy Gaughan	"No Scrubs"				✔
11	Cynthia Ediondseri	"Spotlight"				
12	Brendan McCahey	"Starman"	✔			

=== Blind Auditions 5 ===
Order	Artist	Song	Coach's and contestant's choices			
Order	Artist	Song	Bressie	Dolores	Kian	Jamelia
1	Laura May Lenehan	"Wrecking Ball"			✔	✔
2	Ryan Parsons	"Sweet Disposition"				
3	Nella Dwyer	"Best Song Ever"		✔		
4	Paddy Molloy	"Dreams"			✔	
5	Paula O'Niell	"Who Knew"				
6	Sarah Sylvia	"Jóga"	✔	✔	✔	
7	Paddy Ryan	"Cosmic Love"				
8	Emma Walsh	"Young and Beautiful"	✔			
9	Daragh Kiely	"Wonderwall"			✔	
10	David O'Regan	"Just the Two of Us"				
11	Daisy Valenzuela	"Teenage Dream"				✔
12	Jane Wade	"Roxanne"				

=== Blind Auditions 6 ===
Order	Artist	Song	Coach's and contestant's choices			
Order	Artist	Song	Bressie	Dolores	Kian	Jamelia
1	Laura O'Connor	"Hold On, We're Going Home"	✔		✔	
2	Peter McGrory	"Black"				
3	Peter Whitford	"Viva Forever"	✔	✔	✔	✔
4	Joanne Prendergast	"What Now"				
5	Craig McMarrow	"Give Me Love"			✔	✔
6	Stephen Rixon	"Bring Me to Life"				
7	Saira Loughlan	"Touch Me"				
8	Leah McConnell	"Summertime Sadness"			✔	✔
9	Lisa Geraghty	"Clarity"				
10	Paddy Reilly	"Ring of Fire"	✔			
11	Anna O'Hanlon	"Cry Me a River"		✔		✔

==== RTÉ 2fm Wildcards ====
1. Caoin Fitzpatrick
2. Ciara Donnelly
3. Áine Finlay
4. Brendan McCahey
5. Daragh Kiely

== Battles ==
The Battle round took place on 15 and 16 December in The Helix. The coaches' mentors included UK singers Sarah Harding and Matt Cardle. There was a new format added to the battles for this series. If an act lost their battle, they are not immediately out of the competition. Each coach has one 'Steal' where they get the opportunity to take one losing act and have them join their team for the live shows. They do this by pressing their 'I Want You' button. 24 acts made it to the Live Shows.

Color key

Artist won the Battle and advances to the Finals
Artist lost the Battle but was stolen by another coach and advances to the Finals
Artist lost the Battle and was eliminated
Artist withdrew from the competition

Coach	Adviser	Artists						Steal
Bressie	Sarah Harding	Caoin Fitzpatrick	Ciara Donnelly		Paddy Reilly	Heather Stuart	Brendan McCahey	Jamie Stanton
Bressie	Sarah Harding	Kedar Friis-Lawrence	Emma Walsh		Pádraig Byrne	Sarah Sylvia	Roel Villones	Jamie Stanton
Dolores O'Riordan	Fiachna O Braonain	John Hogan	Anna O'Hanlon	Peter Whitford	Mariah Butler	Jamie Stanton	Kellie Lewis	Emma Walsh
Dolores O'Riordan	Fiachna O Braonain	Nella Dwyer	Thomas Kinney		Sean Sunderland	Michelle Revins	Pauric McLaughlin	Emma Walsh
Kian Egan	Matt Cardle	Aisling Connolly	Danica Holland		Jamie Hartigan	Christopher Stoodley	Dagan Vickers	Pauric McLaughlin
Kian Egan	Matt Cardle	Jay Boland	Daragh Kiely		Laura O'Connor	Craig McMarrow	Paddy Molloy	Pauric McLaughlin
Jamelia	Courtney Rumbold	Gavin Murray	Malachy Gaughan		Catherine Hughes	Emma Collins	Daisy Valenzuela	Aisling Connolly
Jamelia	Courtney Rumbold	Leah McConnell	Martin McInerney		Laura May Lenehan	Remy Naidoo	Kelly Hannon	Aisling Connolly

=== Battles 1 ===
Order	Coach	Winner	Song	Loser	'Steal' result			
Order	Coach	Winner	Song	Loser	Bressie	Dolores	Kian	Jamelia
1	Jamelia	Gavin Murray	"No Air"	Leah McConnell	—	—	—	—
2	Bressie	Kedar Friis-Lawrence	"Wuthering Heights"	Caoin Fitzpatrick	—	—	—	—
3	Dolores O'Riordan	John Hogan	"Losing My Religion"	Nella Dwyer	—	—	—	—
4	Jamelia	Martin McInerney	"La La La"	Malachy Gaughan	—	—	—	—
5	Kian Egan	Jay Boland	"Just Give Me a Reason"	Aisling Connolly	—	—	—	✔

=== Battles 2 ===
Order	Coach	Winner	Song	Loser	'Steal' result			
Order	Coach	Winner	Song	Loser	Bressie	Dolores	Kian	Jamelia
1	Kian Egan	Danica Holland	"As"	Daragh Kiely	—	—	—	—
2	Dolores O'Riordan	Peter Whitford	"Breakeven"	Anna O'Hanlon	—	—	—	—
2	Dolores O'Riordan	Peter Whitford	"Breakeven"	Thomas Kinney	—	—	—	—
3	Bressie	Ciara Donnelly	"My Hero"	Emma Walsh	—	✔	✔	—
4	Jamelia	Laura May Lenehan	"Roar"	Catherine Hughes	—	—	—	—
5	Kian Egan	Laura O'Connor	"Love the Way You Lie"	Jamie Hartigan	—	—	—	—

=== Battles 3 ===
Order	Coach	Winner	Song	Loser	'Steal' result			
Order	Coach	Winner	Song	Loser	Bressie	Dolores	Kian	Jamelia
1	Dolores O'Riordan	Mariah Butler	"Boulevard of Broken Dreams"	Sean Sunderland	—	—	—	—
2	Kian Egan	Craig McMarrow	"Apologize"	Christopher Stoodley	—	—	—	—
3	Bressie	Pádraig Byrne	"Everybody Wants to Rule the World"	Paddy Reilly	—	—	—	—
4	Dolores O'Riordan	Michelle Revins	"Nothing Else Matters"	Jamie Stanton	✔	—	—	—
5	Jamelia	Remy Naidoo	"Elastic Heart"	Emma Collins	—	—	—	—

=== Battles 4 ===
Order	Coach	Winner	Song	Loser	'Steal' result			
Order	Coach	Winner	Song	Loser	Bressie	Dolores	Kian	Jamelia
1	Jamelia	Daisy Valenzuela	"Fighter"	Kelly Hannon	—	—	—	—
2	Kian Egan	Paddy Molloy	"Radioactive"	Dagan Vickers	—	—	—	—
3	Bressie	Sarah Sylvia	"She Keeps Me Warm"	Heather Stuart	—	—	—	—
4	Dolores O'Riordan	Kellie Lewis	"True Colors"	Pauric McLaughlin	—	—	✔	—
5	Bressie	Brendan McCahey	"Everytime You Go Away"	Roel Villones	—	—	—	—

== The Live Shows ==
The Live Shows aired live on RTÉ One from The Helix in a two-hour-long show every Sunday evening from mid-March to the end of April. The 24 contestants were narrowed down to just four by public voting and the grand-final saw each remaining act release their single with a famous musician. The winner of the show received a recording contract with Universal Music and the title of 'The Voice of Ireland'.

=== Results summary ===
Color keys
Artist's info

Artist from Team Bressie
Artist from Team Jamelia
Artist from Team Dolores
Artist from Team Kian

Result details

Winner
Runner-up
Third place
Fourth place
Artist advanced to the finals

Artist was saved by the public
Artist was saved as a wildcard
Artist was in the bottom two
Artist received the fewest of the public's vote and was eliminated
Artist did not perform on that particular week

Artist	Week 1	Week 2	Week 3	Week 4	Top 10	Semi-Final	Final
Brendan McCahey	Safe		Safe		Safe	Advanced	Winner
Kellie Lewis	Safe			Safe	Safe	Advanced	Runner-Up
Laura May Lenehan	Safe			Safe	Safe	Advanced	Third Place
Jamie Stanton		Safe		Safe	Safe	Advanced	Fourth Place
Jay Boland	Safe		Safe		Safe	Eliminated	Eliminated (Week 6)
Paddy Molloy		Safe		Wildcard	Safe	Eliminated	Eliminated (Week 6)
Danica Holland		Bottom two		Safe	Eliminated	Eliminated (Week 5)	
Mariah Butler		Safe	Safe		Eliminated	Eliminated (Week 5)	
Gavin Murray	Bottom two		Wildcard		Eliminated	Eliminated (Week 5)	
Aisling Connolly		Bottom two	Safe		Eliminated	Eliminated (Week 5)	
Remy Naidoo		Safe		Eliminated	Eliminated (Week 4)		
Sarah Sylvia	Bottom two			Eliminated	Eliminated (Week 4)		
Michelle Revins	Bottom two			Eliminated	Eliminated (Week 4)		
Emma Walsh		Bottom two	Eliminated	Eliminated (Week 3)			
Laura O'Connor	Bottom two		Eliminated	Eliminated (Week 3)			
Ciara Donnelly		Bottom two	Eliminated	Eliminated (Week 3)			
Martin McInerney		Eliminated	Eliminated (Week 2)				
Pádraig Byrne		Eliminated	Eliminated (Week 2)				
Craig McMorrow		Eliminated	Eliminated (Week 2)				
Peter Whitford		Eliminated	Eliminated (Week 2)				
Daisy Valenzuela	Eliminated	Eliminated (Week 1)					
Kedar Friis-Lawrence	Eliminated	Eliminated (Week 1)					
John Hogan	Eliminated	Eliminated (Week 1)					
Pauric McLaughlin	Eliminated	Eliminated (Week 1)					

=== Live show details ===
Color key

Artist was saved by the public's vote
Artist was part of the bottom two in his/her team and saved by his/her coach
Artist was saved by the public vote as a wildcard
Artist was eliminated

==== Live Show 1 (16 March) ====
- Guest performer: Kian Egan ("Home")

Artists' performances on the first live show
Order	Coach	Artist	Song	Coaches' scores					Result
Order	Coach	Artist	Song	Bressie	Dolores	Kian	Jamelia	Total	Result
1	Kian Egan	Jay Boland	"Happy"	7	7		6	20	Safe
2	Kian Egan	Pauric McLaughlin	"Revelate"	6	7		6	19	Eliminated
3	Kian Egan	Laura O'Connor	"Move"	6	6		7	19	Kian's choice
4	Dolores O'Riordan	Michelle Revins	"Come as You Are"	8		7	8	23	Dolores's choice
5	Dolores O'Riordan	John Hogan	"Freaky Wild" (original song)	6		6	6	18	Eliminated
6	Dolores O'Riordan	Kellie Lewis	"Wings"	7		9	6	22	Safe
7	Jamelia	Gavin Murray	"Of the Night"	8	6	6		20	Jamelia's choice
8	Jamelia	Laura May Lenehan	"Picking Up the Pieces"	8	6	8		22	Safe
9	Jamelia	Daisy Valenzuela	"Just Dance"	6	6	6		18	Eliminated
10	Bressie	Sarah Sylvia	"Clarity"		8	7	7	22	Bressie's choice
11	Bressie	Kedar Friis-Lawrence	"Another Love"		5	6	6	17	Eliminated
12	Bressie	Brendan McCahey	"You Can't Judge a Book by the Cover"		7	8	9	24	Safe

- Three artists from each team performed with one from each team being eliminated
  - Each coach rated each artists performance out of ten
  - The public vote was combined with the coaches' scores
  - The artist from each team with the highest combined total was sent through to the next round
  - Each coach sent a second artist from their own team through to the next round

==== Live Show 2 (23 March) ====
- Guest performer: Keith Hanley ("Gonna Dance"), Shane Filan ("")

Artists' performances on the second live show
Order	Coach	Artist	Song	Coaches' scores					Result
Order	Coach	Artist	Song	Bressie	Dolores	Kian	Jamelia	Total	Result
1	Dolores O'Riordan	Mariah Butler	"Mama's Broken Heart"	8		7	7	22	Safe
2	Dolores O'Riordan	Peter Whitford	"Space Oddity"	7		6	7	20	Eliminated
3	Dolores O'Riordan	Emma Walsh	"Stronger (What Doesn't Kill You)"	8		7	5	20	Dolores's choice
4	Jamelia	Aisling Connolly	"Strong"	8	6	8		22	Jamelia's choice
5	Jamelia	Martin McInerney	"Stayin' Alive"	7	7	7		21	Eliminated
6	Jamelia	Remy Naidoo	"How Long Will I Love You"	7	6	7		20	Safe
7	Bressie	Padraig Byrne	"Dream Catch Me"		6	6	5	17	Eliminated
8	Bressie	Jamie Stanton	"I Don't Want to Be"		7	8	8	23	Safe
9	Bressie	Ciara Donnelly	"Take Me to Church"		7	8	7	22	Bressie's Choice
10	Kian Egan	Paddy Molloy	"Story of My Life"	7	7		7	21	Safe
11	Kian Egan	Craig McMorrow	"Fly Away"	6	6		6	18	Eliminated
12	Kian Egan	Danica Holland	"Do What U Want"	7	7		6	20	Kian's Choice

- Three artists from each team performed with one from each team being eliminated
  - Each coach rated each artists performance out of ten
  - The public vote was combined with the coaches' scores
  - The artist from each team with the highest combined total was sent through to the next round
  - Each coach sent a second artist from their own team through to the next round

==== Live Show 3 (30 March) ====
- Matt Cardle

Artists' performances on the second live show
Order	Coach	Artist	Song	Coaches' scores					Result
Order	Coach	Artist	Song	Bressie	Dolores	Kian	Jamelia	Total	Result
1	Jamelia	Gavin Murray	"Show Me Love"	7	6	6		19	Wildcard
2	Jamelia	Aisling Connolly	"Free"	8	7	8		23	Safe
3	Bressie	Brendan McCahey	"She's a Mystery to Me"		8	8	9	25	Safe
4	Bressie	Ciara Donnelly	"I Bet You Look Good on the Dancefloor"		6	7	7	20	Eliminated
5	Kian Egan	Laura O'Connor	"Dirty Diana"	7	6		7	20	Eliminated
6	Kian Egan	Jay Boland	"Say Something"	8	7		8	23	Safe
7	Dolores O'Riordan	Emma Walsh	"Go Your Own Way"	7		6	6	19	Eliminated
8	Dolores O'Riordan	Mariah Butler	"Crazy"	8		9	9	26	Safe

- Two artists from each team performed.
- One act from each team went through, with one of the four remaining acts receiving a wildcard.
- The contestant with the highest combined scored (public vote and judges) received the wildcard.
  - Each coach rated each artists performance out of ten
  - The public vote was combined with the coaches' scores
  - The artist from each team with the highest combined total was sent through to the next round

==== Live Show 4 (6 April) ====
- Guest performer: The Coronas

Artists' performances on the second live show
Order	Coach	Artist	Song	Coaches' scores					Result
Order	Coach	Artist	Song	Bressie	Dolores	Kian	Jamelia	Total	Result
1	Jamelia	Remy Naidoo	"Rather Be"	7	6	7		20	Eliminated
2	Jamelia	Laura May Lenehan	"Little Things"	8	8	9		25	Safe
3	Dolores O'Riordan	Kellie Lewis	"Edge of Seventeen"	7		7	7	21	Safe
4	Dolores O'Riordan	Michelle Revins	"Mad World"	7		7	7	21	Eliminated
5	Kian Egan	Paddy Molloy	"Wild Heart"	7	6		7	20	Wildcard
6	Kian Egan	Danica Holland	"Hurt"	9	8		9	26	Safe
7	Bressie	Sarah Sylvia	"Street Spirit"		8	8	8	24	Eliminated
8	Bressie	Jamie Stanton	"What Makes a Good Man?"		8	8	8	24	Safe

- Two artists from each team performed.
- One act from each team went through, with one of the four remaining acts receiving a wildcard.
- The contestant with the highest combined scored (public vote and judges) received the wildcard.
  - Each coach rated each artists performance out of ten
  - The public vote was combined with the coaches' scores
  - The artist from each team with the highest combined total was sent through to the next round

==== Top 10 (13 April) ====
- Guest performer: The Riptide Movement

Order	Coach	Artist	Song	Coaches' scores					Result
Order	Coach	Artist	Song	Bressie	Dolores	Kian	Jamelia	Total	Result
1	Bressie	Jamie Stanton	"Place Your Hands"		7	6	6	19	Safe
2	Bressie	Brendan McCahey	"For Once In My Life"		8	9	9	26	Safe
3	Jamelia	Gavin Murray	"Let Me Love You"	7	7	6		20	Eliminated
4	Jamelia	Laura May Lenehan	"Addicted to You"	7	7	8		22	Safe
5	Jamelia	Aisling Connolly	"Time after Time"	7	6	7		20	Eliminated
6	Kian Egan	Paddy Molloy	"One day"	7	7		7	21	Safe
7	Kian Egan	Danica Holland	"Lady Marmalade"	8	7		9	24	Eliminated
8	Kian Egan	Jay Boland	"All of Me"	8	8		8	24	Safe
9	Dolores O'Riordan	Kellie Lewis	"Do I wanna know?"	6		6	5	17	Safe
10	Dolores O'Riordan	Mariah Butler	"Paradise City"	7		9	9	25	Eliminated

==== Leathcheannais (20 Aibreán) ====
- Taibheoirí:
  - The Riptide Movement: "All Works Out"
  - Original Rude Boys: "Feel It In Your Soul"

Uimhir	Breitheamh	Amhránaí	Amhrán	Scóir					Toradh
Uimhir	Breitheamh	Amhránaí	Amhrán	Bressie	Dolores	Kian	Jamelia	Total	Toradh
1	Dolores Ní Ríordáin	Kellie Lewis	"Cosmic Love"	8		8	8	24	Slán
2	Kian Egan	Paddy Molloy	"She Looks so Perfect"	6	6		6	18	Díbeartha
3	Jamelia	Laura May Lenehan	"Show Me Heaven"	8	7	8		23	Slán
4	Bressie	Brendan McCahey	"Stay With Me"		8	10	10	28	Slán
5	Kian Egan	Jay Boland	"Treasure"	7	7		8	22	Díbeartha
6	Bressie	Jamie Stanton	"Best of You"		8	6	6	20	Slán

==== Ceannais (27 Aibreán) ====
- Taibheoir: Clean Bandit: "Rather Be"

Uimhir	Breitheamh	Amhránaí	chéad Amhrán	Dara Amhrán	Toradh
1	Bressie	Jamie Stanton	"I Don't wanna be"	"July" (le Mundy)	Ceathrú
2	Dolores Ní Ríordáin	Kellie Lewis	"Running Up That Hill"	"Saints and Sinners" (le Paddy Casey)	Dara
3	Jamelia	Laura May Lenehan	"Little Things"	"Sunburst" (le Dave Browne)	Tríú
4	Bressie	Brendan McCahey	"You Can't Judge a Book By The Cover'"	"Celebrate" (le Jerry Fish)	Buaiteoir

== Ratings ==
#	Episode	Air date	Official RTÉ One rating
1	Blind Auditions 1	5 January 2014	578,000
2	Blind Auditions 2	12 January 2014	—
3	Blind Auditions 3	19 January 2014	—
4	Blind Auditions 4	26 January 2014	655,900
5	Blind Auditions 5	2 February 2014	637,000
6	Blind Auditions 6	9 February 2014	596,000
7	Battle Rounds 1	16 February 2014	638,000
8	Battle Rounds 2	23 February 2014	594,000
9	Battle Rounds 3	2 March 2014	—
10	Battle Rounds 4	9 March 2014	557,000
11	Live Show 1	16 March 2014	525,000
12	Live Show 2	23 March 2014	—
13	Live Show 3	30 March 2014	—
14	Live Show 4	6 April 2014	401,000
15	Live Show 5	13 April 2014	—
16	Semi-Final	20 April 2014	—
17	Final	27 April 2014	—
