= Home (Kian Egan album) =

Studio album by Kian Egan
- Released: 14 March 2014
- Recorded: 2014
- Genre: Pop, pop rock
- Length: 37:23
- Label: Rhino
- Producer: Brian Rawling

Singles from Home
- 1. "Home" Released: 10 February 2014; 2. "I'll Be" Released: 12 May 2014

Professional ratings
Review scores
Source	Rating
Renowned for Sound	4/5 stars

Home is the debut solo studio album by Irish singer Kian Egan, mostly known as a member of Westlife. Consisting entirely of cover versions, it was released Ireland on 14 March 2014, and on 17 March in the United Kingdom, through Rhino Records. A signed limited edition was exclusively released through Amazon.

== Background ==
Egan said of the album, "I am incredibly excited to be recording an album with Warner Music. Music is my first love, and to be able to get in the studio to record these amazing songs by such wonderful writers is such a thrill and an honour for me."

== Track listing ==
No.	Title	Writer(s)	Length
1.	"Home"	Chris Daughtry	3:45
2.	"What Hurts the Most"	Jeffrey Steele, Steve Robson	3:29
3.	"The Reason"	Douglas Robb, Dan Estrin, Chris Light Hesse, Markku Lappalainen	3:56
4.	"Not a Day Goes By"	Maribeth Derry, Steve Diamond	4:03
5.	"I Run to You" (with Jodi Albert)	Hillary Scott, Charles Kelley, Dave Haywood, Tom Douglas	3:46
6.	"I'll Be"	Edwin McCain	4:00
7.	"I'm Ready"	Bryan Adams, Jim Vallance	4:24
8.	"Waiting for Superman"	Chris Daughtry, Martin Johnson, Sam Hollander	4:17
9.	"Here Without You"	3 Doors Down	3:55
10.	"Wanted"	Hunter Hayes, Troy Verges	3:48

== Charts ==
Chart (2014)	Peak position
Irish Albums (IRMA)	2
Scottish Albums (OCC)	6
UK Albums (OCC)	9

== Release history ==
Country	Release date	Label	Format
Ireland	14 March 2014	Rhino, Warner	Digital download
