= The Voice of Ireland series 5 =

The Voice of Ireland
- Series 5
- Coaches: Bressie; Rachel Stevens; Kian Egan; Una Foden
- Winner: Michael Lawson
- Winning coach: Bressie
- Runner-up: Kelesa Mulcahy

Release
- Original network: RTÉ One; RTÉ Two (repeat)
- Original release: 3 January – 24 April 2016

Series chronology
- ← Previous; Series 4

The Voice of Ireland was an Irish reality talent show which is broadcast by RTÉ. In June 2015, it was confirmed by the programme's broadcaster RTÉ that the show would be recommissioned for a fifth series, despite speculation of its axing for Syco Productions' Ireland's Got Talent. The Voice of Ireland continued to be produced by Screentime ShinAwiL Productions, and filmed in The Helix.

It was confirmed that Una Healy of The Saturdays would return, alongside former S Club 7 member Rachel Stevens, Kian Egan and Bressie.

Michael Lawson won the title, marking Bressie's third and final win as a coach. Kelesa Mulcahy from Team Kian as runner-up and Nigel Connell from Team Una third.

== Teams ==
Color key

Winner
Runner-up
Third place
Fourth place
Eliminated in the Live shows
Eliminated in the Knockouts (live)
Artist was stolen by another coach (Name is struck through)
Eliminated in the Battles
Artist withdrew from the competition

Coaches	Top 56			
Una Foden				
Una Foden	Nigel Connell	Emmett Daly	Kirsty Rose	Johnny Kohlmeyer
Una Foden	Emmie Reek	Fiona Garvey	Sarah Daly	Maria Cuche
Una Foden	Ashley Crowe	Mags White	Lola Arisekola	Jessica Brett
Una Foden	Hannah Ferguson	Eimear Crealey		
Kian Egan				
Kian Egan	Kelesa Mulcahy	Jasmine Kavanagh	Carl Gillic	Luke Ray Lacey
Kian Egan	Nik McDonald	Andrew Berry	Kelsey Hoare	Clodagh Lawlor
Kian Egan	Aaron Caroll	Laura Doyle	Darragh Lee	Cathy Moore
Kian Egan	Mary Ward	Ciara Freeman		
Rachel Stevens				
Rachel Stevens	Laura O'Connor	Matthew Soares	Caoimhe McCarthy	Johnny Garvey
Rachel Stevens	Ciaran O'Driscoll	Loic Bontemps	Sara Moore	Jordon O'Neill
Rachel Stevens	Stephanie Anketell	Sophie McDermott	Erin Rice	Jessica Brett
Rachel Stevens	Alex Sykes	Alison Rushe		
Bressie				
Bressie	Michael Lawson	Moylan Brunnock	Nerissa Moore	Marty Bonner
Bressie	Pauric O'Meara	David Idioh	Marc Egan	Donna McDade
Bressie	Georgina Richmond	Patrick Loewen	Sean Byrne	Karen Louise
Bressie	Nicky Wicks	Michaela Hogg		

== Blind auditions ==
=== Episode 1 (3 January) ===
Order	Artist	Age	Song	Coach's and contestant's choices			
Order	Artist	Age	Song	Bressie	Rachel	Kian	Una
1	Kirsty Rose	20	"Ignition"	—	✔	✔	✔
2	Stephanie Anketell	26	"Roxanne"	—	✔	✔	✔
3	Shauna Carrick	24	"The Sad Truth"	—	—	—	—
4	Jasmine Kavanagh	21	"Drunk in Love"	✔	✔	✔	✔
5	Carl Gillic	23	"Jeremy"	✔	—	✔	—
6	Nik McDonald	41	"Ramble On"	✔	✔	✔	✔
7	Brenda Mangwandi	25	"E.T."	—	—	—	—
8	Laura Whelan	19	"King"	—	—	—	—
9	Johnny Kohlmeyer	32	"Somebody Like You"	—	✔	—	✔
10	Ashley Crowe	29	"Walking on Broken Glass"	—	—	—	✔
11	Febbie Manapsal	21	"On My Mind"	—	—	—	—
12	Johnny Garvey	34	"Shake It Off"	—	✔	—	—

=== Episode 2 (10 January) ===
Order	Artist	Age	Song	Coach's and contestant's choices			
Order	Artist	Age	Song	Bressie	Rachel	Kian	Una
1	Mags White	34	"Standing in the Way of Control"	—	✔	✔	✔
2	Kristyna Hayes	25	"Dancing in the Dark"	—	—	—	—
3	Pauric O'Meara	21	"Maniac 2000	✔	✔	✔	✔
4	Miranda Trouabal	29	"My Baby Just Cares for Me"	—	—	—	—
5	Megan Quinn	20	"Ooh La La"	—	—	—	—
6	Emmie Reek	27	"One and Only"	✔	✔	✔	✔
7	Nerissa Moore	23	"Electric Feel"	✔	—	—	—
8	Emma Houlihan	20	"Fight Song"	—	—	—	—
9	Luke Ray Lacey	19	"I See Fire"	—	✔	✔	—
10	Caoimhe McCarthy	19	"Flashlight"	—	✔	—	—
11	Fiona Garvey	19	"Try"	—	✔	—	✔
12	Andrew Berry	19	"Dancing on My Own"	—	—	✔	—

=== Episode 3 (17 January) ===
Order	Artist	Age	Song	Coach's and contestant's choices			
Order	Artist	Age	Song	Bressie	Rachel	Kian	Una
1	Matthew Soares	18	"One Night Only"	—	✔	—	—
2	Marty Bonner	34	"You Shook Me All Night Long"	✔	—	✔	—
3	Joy Isabel	31	"Listen to Your Heart	—	—	—	—
4	Sofia Lozano	29	"Objection"	—	—	—	—
5	Oonagh O'Gorman	32	"Best of You"	—	—	—	—
6	Ciaran O'Driscoll	27	"Creep"	✔	✔	✔	✔
7	Moylan Brunnock	20	"Woodstock"	✔	✔	✔	✔
8	Sarah Daly	28	"You Got the Love"	—	—	—	✔
9	Dan Roche	19	"Let Me Love You"	—	—	—	—
10	Loïc Bontemps	21	"Rocket Man"	—	✔	—	—
11	Tara Browne	25	"Glitterball"	—	✔	✔	✔
12	Kelsey Hoare	20	"From Eden"	—	—	✔	—

=== Episode 4 (24 January) ===
Order	Artist	Age	Song	Coach's and contestant's choices			
Order	Artist	Age	Song	Bressie	Rachel	Kian	Una
1	Maria Cuche	50	"If I Were A Boy"	—	—	—	✔
2	Conor Cunningham	22	"Teenage Dirtbag"	—	—	—	—
3	Kelesa Mulcahy	33	"Highway to Hell	✔	✔	✔	✔
4	Sara Moore	34	"Can't Remember to Forget You"	—	✔	—	—
5	Karen Louise	18	"Amnesia"	✔	—	—	—
6	Jenni Flaherty	26	"Style"	—	—	—	—
7	Clodagh Lawlor	22	"How Deep Is Your Love"	✔	✔	✔	✔
8	David Idioh	33	"Stand by Me"	✔	—	—	—
9	Patrick Kelly	34	"Nights In White Satin"	—	—	—	—
10	Jordan O'Neill	18	"Stolen Dance"	—	✔	—	—
11	Nigel Connell	42	"Desire"	—	✔	—	✔
12	Jason Fahy	41	"Hand in My Pocket"	—	—	—	—

=== Episode 5 (31 January) ===
Order	Artist	Age	Song	Coach's and contestant's choices			
Order	Artist	Age	Song	Bressie	Rachel	Kian	Una
1	Aaron Carroll	26	"These Boots Are Made For Walkin"	—	✔	✔	—
2	Emmett Daly	26	"Broken Wings"	✔	✔	✔	✔
3	Megan Ring	19	"Atomic"	—	—	—	—
4	Paulie O'Brien	37	"Too Close	—	—	—	—
5	Marc Egan	27	"Pyro"	✔	—	—	—
6	Laura Doyle	19	"For You"	✔	✔	✔	✔
7	Sophie McDermott	18	"Complicated"	—	✔	—	—
8	Donna McDade	20	"Secret Love"	✔	—	—	—
9	Darren Sherlock	19	"The Scientist"	—	—	—	—
10	Erin Rice	24	"I Got a Woman"	—	✔	—	—
11	Dervilla Egan	20	"Shine"	—	—	—	—
12	Lola Arisekola	20	"Papa's Got A Brand New Bag"	✔	✔	✔	✔
