= Michael Lawson (singer) =

Irish singer who won The Voice of Ireland in 2016

- Born: Newbliss, County Monaghan
- Genres: Pop
- Occupation: Singer
- Instrument: Vocals
- Years active: 2016–present
- Label: Universal

Michael Lawson is an Irish singer who won the fifth season of The Voice of Ireland in 2016.

== Career ==
After successfully becoming the fifth and final winner of The Voice of Ireland, he won a recording contract with Universal Music.

His winner's single, a cover of "7 Years" by Lukas Graham was released on 24 April 2016. It failed to have any impact in the Irish charts.

His debut solo single, titled Revival, was released to Irish radio on 5 July 2016. A music video for the song was released on 14 July 2016, featuring his mentor Niall Breslin from The Voice and snippets of his time in the competition. It was released for download on 15 July 2016 and failed to have any success in the charts.

Awards and achievements
Preceded by Patrick Donoghue	The Voice of Ireland; Winner; 2016	Succeeded by N/A
