= The Voice of Ireland =

- Genre: Reality competition
- Created by: John de Mol Jr.
- Presented by: Eoghan McDermott; Kathryn Thomas; Stephen Byrne (Online)
- Judges: Bressie; Kian Egan; Sharon Corr; Brian Kennedy; Jamelia; Dolores O'Riordan; Una Healy; Rachel Stevens
- Country of origin: Ireland
- Original language: English
- No. of seasons: 5
- No. of episodes: 71

Production
- Producer: Screentime Shinawil Productions
- Production location: The Helix
- Running time: 72–104 minutes (inc. adverts)

Original release
- Network: RTÉ One
- Release: 8 January 2012 – 24 April 2016

Related
- The All Ireland Talent Show; Dancing with the Stars; The Voice (franchise)

The Voice of Ireland is the Irish edition of the international TV franchise The Voice, a reality singing competition created by media tycoon John de Mol Jr. The first series began airing from 8 January 2012 on RTÉ One. The coaches originally were Bressie, Sharon Corr, Kian Egan and Brian Kennedy. Kennedy left after the first series and was replaced by Jamelia. After the second series, Corr quit the show owing to other commitments and was replaced by Dolores O'Riordan. Following series 3, Dolores and Jamelia quit. The coaches for series 4 were Bressie, Una Healy, Kian Egan and Rachel Stevens. The show was hosted by Kathryn Thomas and co-hosted by Eoghan McDermott, who also presented backstage show The Voice After Party in Series 3.

The series was part of The Voice franchise and was based on a similar competition format in the Netherlands entitled The Voice of Holland. The show replaced The All Ireland Talent Show. One of the important premises of the show is the quality of the singing talent. Four coaches, themselves popular performing artists, train the talents in their group and occasionally perform with them. Talents are selected in blind auditions, where the coaches cannot see, but only hear the auditioner.

The TV show "blind" auditions were held at the Helix, and were broadcast for the first five weeks of the series. The Battle Phase was broadcast over three weeks from the second week of February to the last week of February each year. The winner of the show is offered a recording contract with Universal Music Ireland worth €100,000.

The current and final holder of the crown The Voice of Ireland is the series 5 champion, Michael Lawson. To date, all five winners of the Irish version of the franchise have been males.

On 3 August 2016, it was announced that the show was going to be replaced by an Irish version of Strictly Come Dancing.

== History ==
The show replaced The All Ireland Talent Show. The Voice of Ireland aired on RTÉ One and was produced by Screentime Shinawil Productions.

=== Auditions ===
The Blind Auditions for Series 1 took place at The Helix, Dublin, between 26 and 31 October 2011 in front of a live audience. The first series began on 8 January 2012 and finished on 29 April 2012. The Blind auditions for Series 2 took place at The Helix, Dublin, between 21 and 25 October 2012 at The Helix. The later seasons followed a very similar schedule.

=== Scheduling and filming ===
The show took place in The Helix in Dublin. The main show aired for 90 minutes. The results show aired for 30 minutes. The show aired on Sunday nights. Filming for the Blind Auditions took place in October each year in Dublin's Helix.

== Format ==
The series consists of three phases:

- Blind audition
- Battle phase
- Live performance shows

=== Blind audition ===
Four coaches, all famous musicians, choose teams of artists through a blind audition process. Each coach has the length of the artists performance to decide if he or she wants that artist on his or her team (twelve in the first series, more in the second); if two or more coaches want the same artist then the singer gets to choose which coach they want to work with. An addition to the third season was that RTÉ 2fm selected 5 wildcards to audition.

=== Battle phase ===
Each team of singers is mentored and developed by their coach. In the second stage, coaches have two of their team members battle against each other by singing the same song, with the coach choosing which team member will advance to the next stage. For the third series a new feature was added whereby if an act lost their battle, they are not immediately out of the competition. Each coach has one 'Steal' where they get the opportunity to take one losing act and have them join their team for the live shows. They do this by pressing their 'I Want You' button.

=== Live performance shows ===
In the final phase, the remaining contestants compete against each other in live broadcasts. The television audience help to decide who moves on. When one team member remains for each coach, the contestants compete against each other in the finale.

=== Post-The Voice of Ireland ===
The winner of the show is offered a recording contract with Universal Music Ireland worth €100,000.

== Coaches and hosts ==
| Name | Series | | | | |
| Name | 1 | 2 | 3 | 4 | 5 |
|---|---|---|---|---|---|
| Bressie | | | | | |
| Kian Egan | | | | | |
| Sharon Corr | | | | | |
| Brian Kennedy | | | | | |
| Jamelia | | | | | |
| Dolores O'Riordan † | | | | | |
| Rachel Stevens | | | | | |
| Una Foden | | | | | |
| Kathryn Thomas | Presenter | | | | |
| Eoghan McDermott | Presenter | | | | |

Coaches gallery

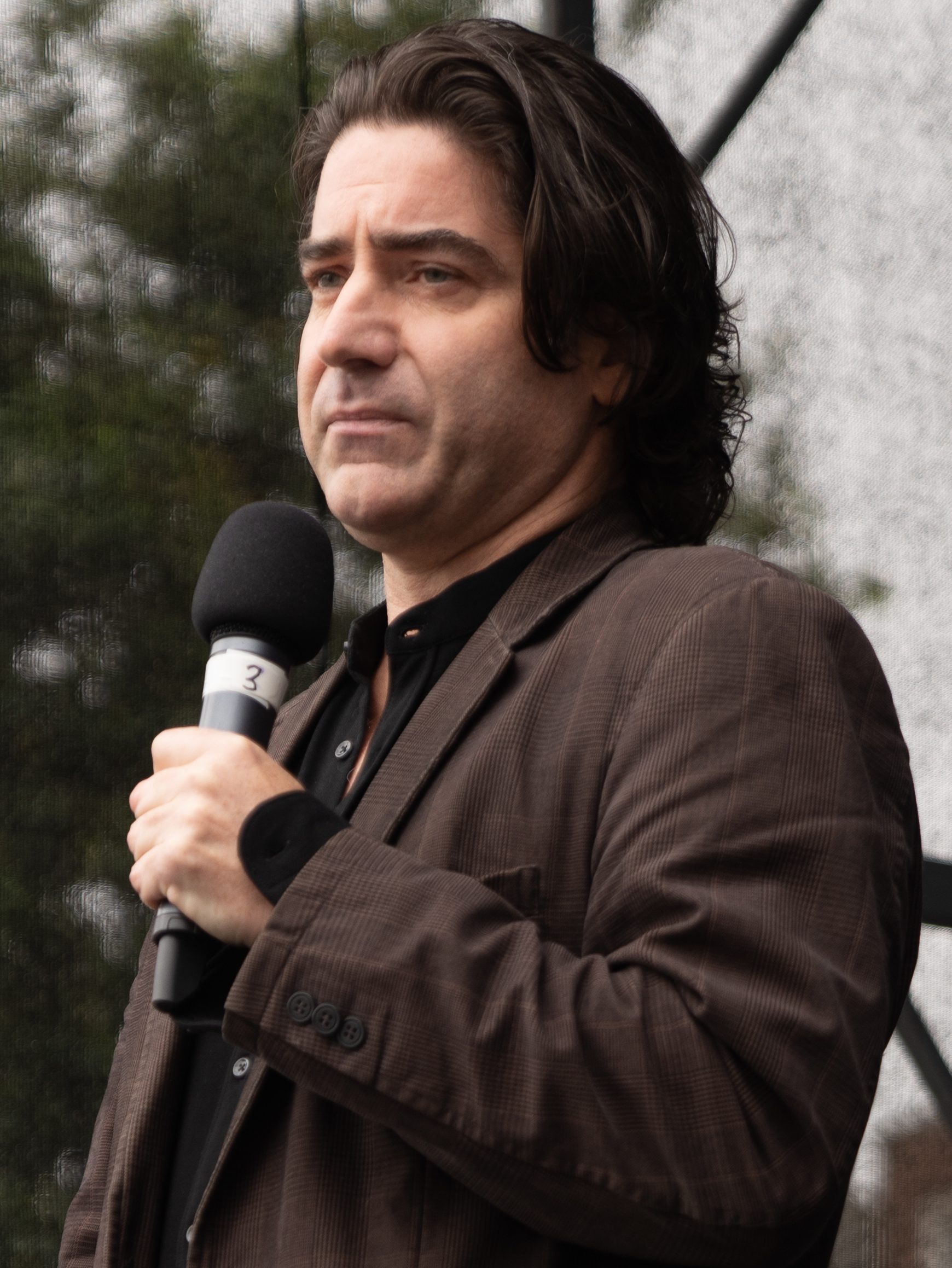
Brian Kennedy (2012)

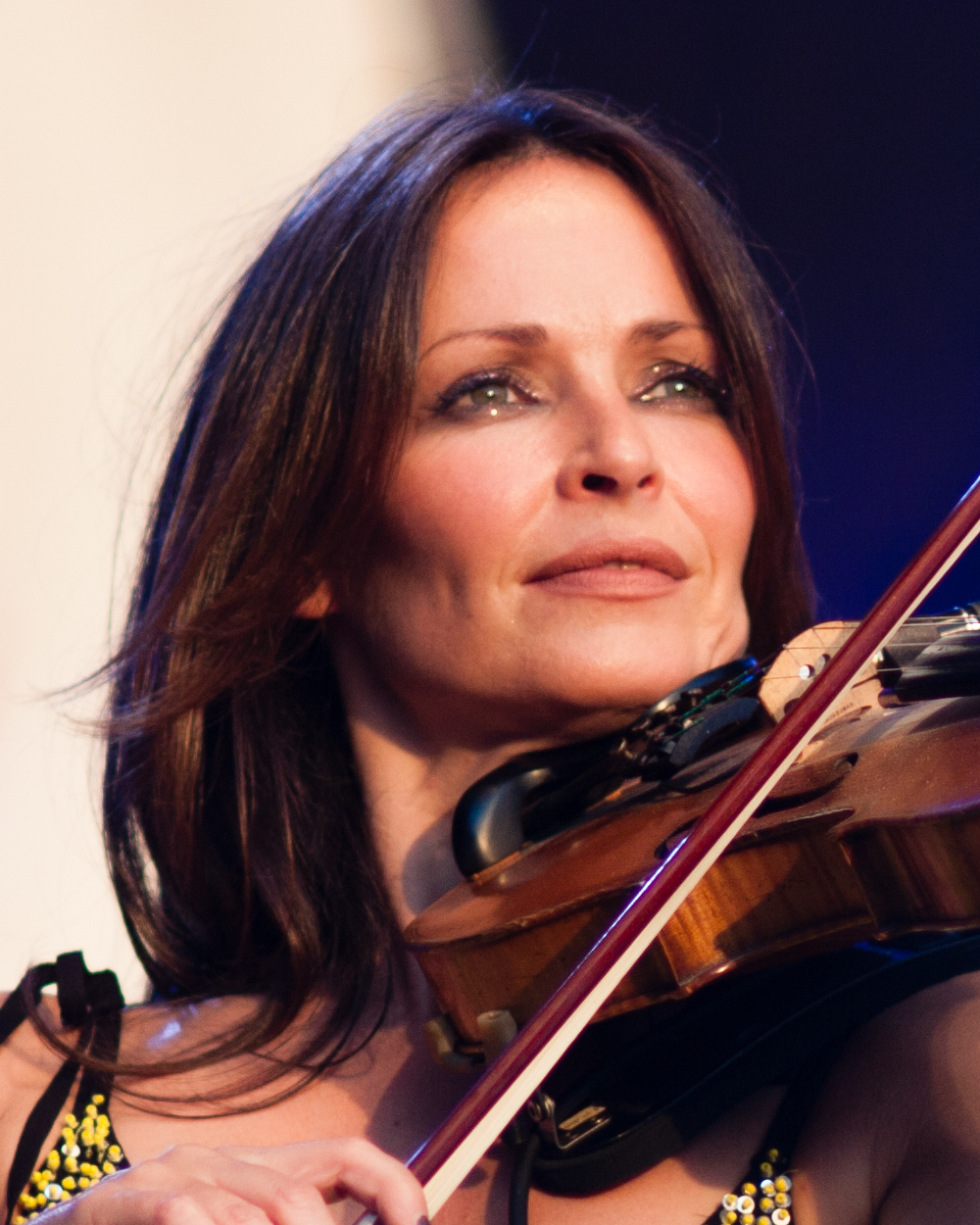
Sharon Corr (2012–2013)

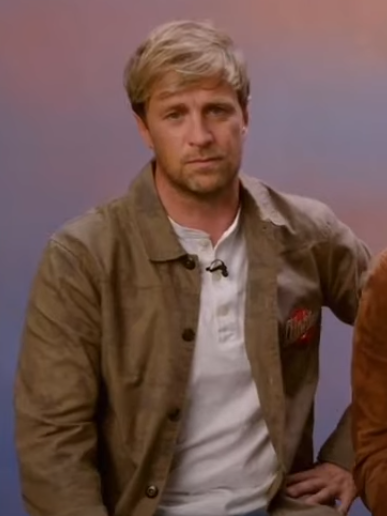
Kian Egan (2012–2016)

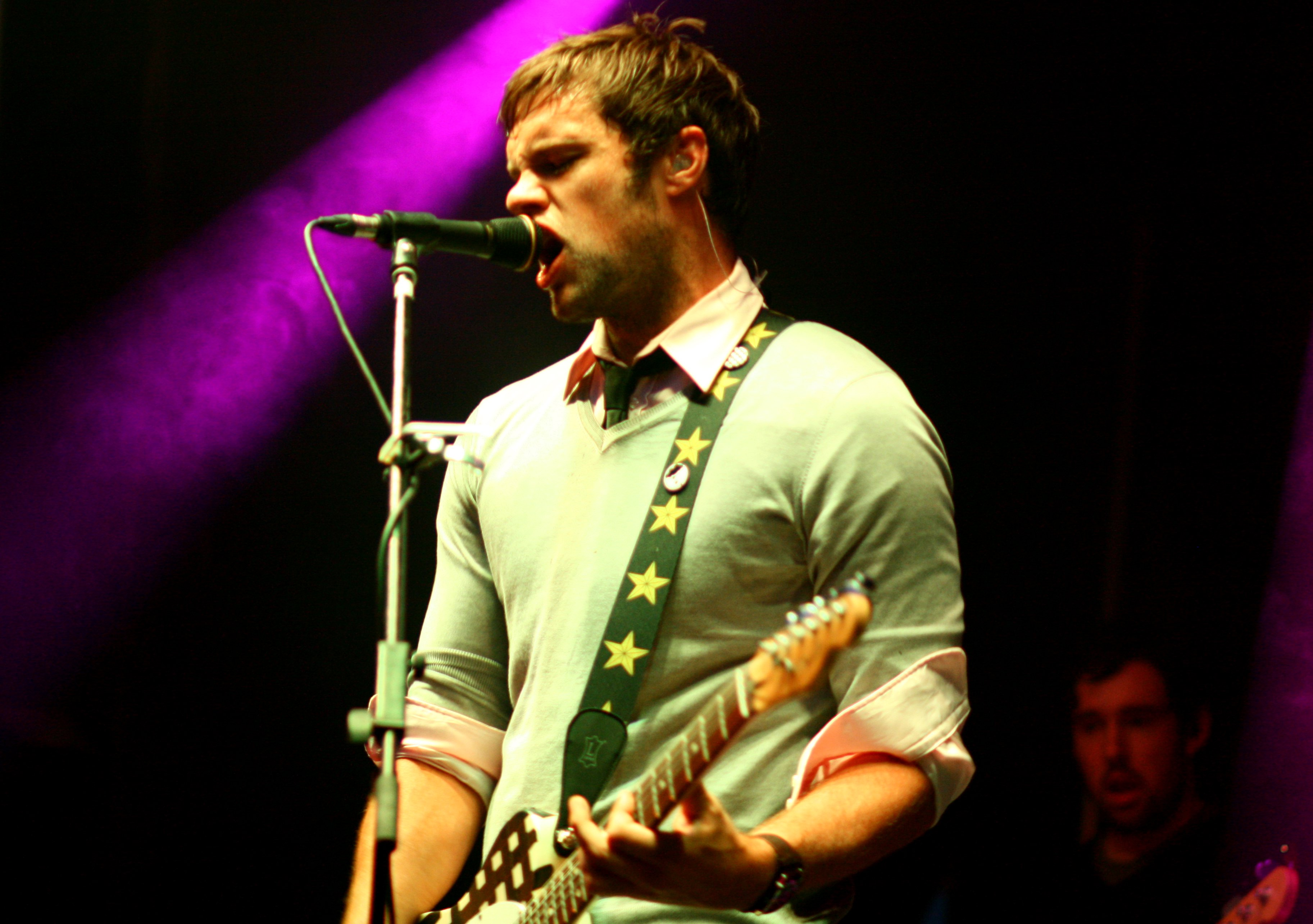
Bressie (2012–2016)

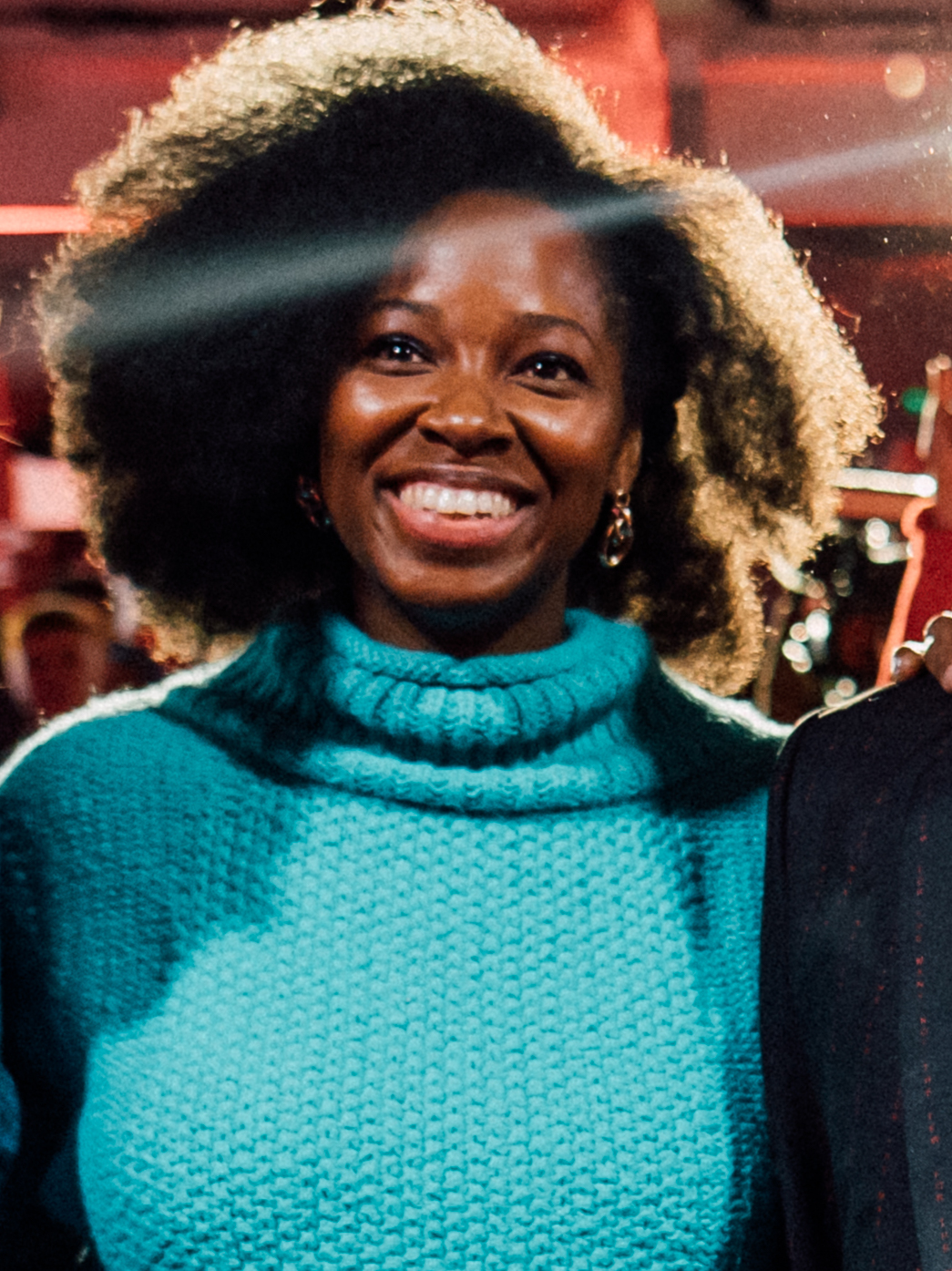
Jamelia (2013–2014)

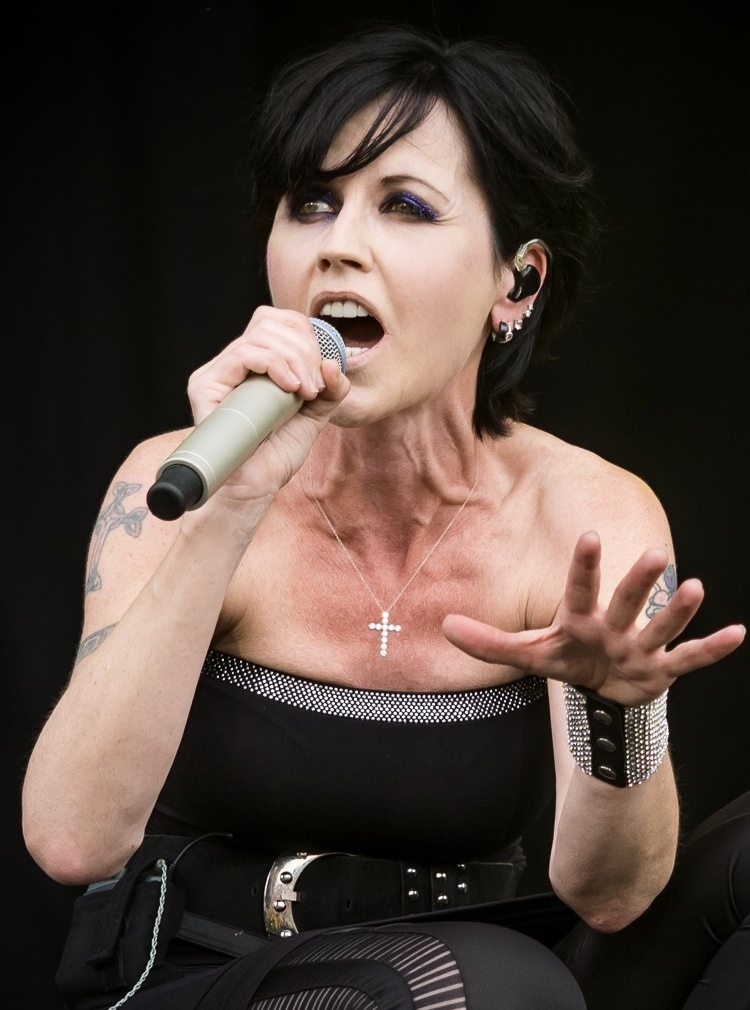
Dolores O'Riordan (†) (2014)

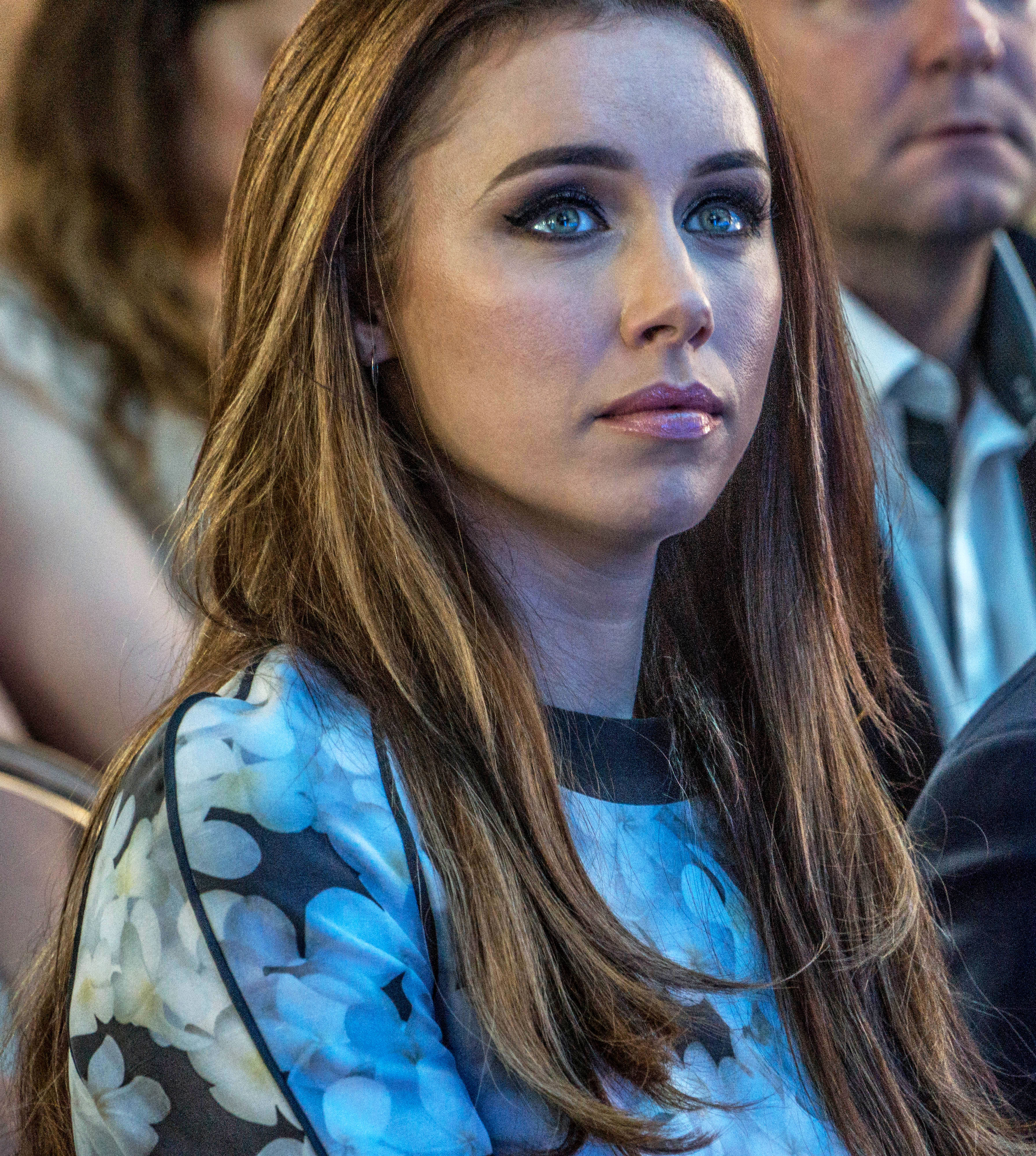
Una Healy (2015–2016)

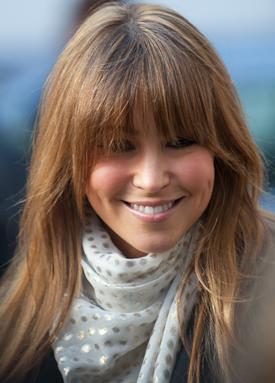
Rachel Stevens (2015–2016)

=== Coaches' teams and their artists ===
Key
– Winning coach. Winners are in bold, eliminated contestants in small font.

| Series | Bressie | Sharon Corr | Kian Egan | Brian Kennedy |
|---|---|---|---|---|
| 1 | **Pat Byrne**; Conor Quinn; Kiera Byrne; Gari Deegan; Jessica Pritzel; Gavin Kenny | Vanessa Whelan; Kim Hayden; Kevin Keeley; Nollaig O'Connor; Kellie Blaise; Fauve Chapman | Jim Devine; Sharon Gaynor; Liam Geddes; Elliot Canavan Doyle; Graham Dowling; Kyle Kennedy | Richie Hayes; Alan Fitzsimons; Brendan Keeley; Sinead Fox; Claire O'Loughlin; Ryan O'Shaughnessy |
| 2 | Bressie | Sharon Corr | Kian Egan | Jamelia |
| 2 | Shannon Murphy; Katy Anna Mohan; Sinead O'Brien; Andrew Mann; Terri O'Reilly; Velvin Lamont | John Gaughan; Aoife McLoughlin; Tammy Browne; Mark Guildea; Stephen Hudson; Dean Anthony | Kelly Mongan; Shane McLaughlin; Ray Scully; Andy Mac Unfraidh; Karl Sheridan; Daryl Phillips | **Keith Hanley**; Wayne Beatty; Dylan Powell; Roisin Carlin; Jennifer Moore; Sophie Rischar |
| 3 | Bressie | Dolores O'Riordan | Kian Egan | Jamelia |
| 3 | **Brendan McCahey**; Jamie Stanton; Sarah Sylvia; Ciara Donnelly; Pádraig Byrne; Kedar Friis-Lawrence | Kellie Lewis; Mariah Butler; Michelle Revins; Emma Walsh; Peter Whitford; John Hogan | Jay Boland; Paddy Molloy; Danica Holland; Laura O'Connor; Craig McMarrow; Pauric McLaughlin | Laura May Lenehan; Gavin Murray; Aisling Connolly; Remy Naidoo; Simon Cody; Martin McInerney; Daisy Valenzuela |
| 4 | Bressie | Rachel Stevens | Kian Egan | Una Healy |
| 4 | Emma Humber; Denise Morgan; Kayleigh Cullinan; John O'Grady; Ashley Loftus; Laura Enright | Sarah McTernan; Kieran McKillop; Patrick Kennedy; Amy Hansard; Gemma Lomar; Cian O'Melia | John Bonham; Helena Bradley Bates; Fionn Gardner; Caoin Fitz; Ciara Monaghan; Pat Fitz | **Patrick Donoghue**; John Sheehy; Niall O'Halloran; Kelley McArdle; Evan Cotter; Nicola Lynch |
| 5 | **Michael Lawson**; Moylan Brunnock; Georgina Richmond | Laura O'Connor; Matthew Soares; Ciaran O'Driscoll | Kelesa Mulcahy; Jasmine Kavanagh; Luke Ray Lacey | Nigel Connell; Emmett Daly; Emmie Reek |

== Series overview ==
Warning: the following table presents a significant amount of different colors.

| Season | Aired | Winner | Runner-up | Third place | Fourth place | Winning coach | Presenters | Coaches (chairs' order) | | | |
| Season | Aired | Winner | Runner-up | Third place | Fourth place | Winning coach | Presenters | 1 | 2 | 3 | 4 |
|---|---|---|---|---|---|---|---|---|---|---|---|
| 1 | 2012 | Pat Byrne | Richie Hayes | Vanessa Whelan | Jim Devine | Bressie | Eoghan McDermott, Kathryn Thomas | Bressie | Sharon | Kian | Brian |
| 2 | 2013 | Keith Hanley | Kelly Mongan | Shane McLaughlin | Shannon Murphy | Jamelia | Eoghan McDermott, Kathryn Thomas | Bressie | Sharon | Kian | Jamelia |
| 3 | 2014 | Brendan McCahey | Kellie Lewis | Laura May Lenehan | Jamie Stanton | Bressie | Eoghan McDermott, Kathryn Thomas | Bressie | Dolores | Kian | Jamelia |
| 4 | 2015 | Patrick Donoghue | Emma Humber | Sarah McTernan | Kieran McKillop | Una Healy | Eoghan McDermott, Kathryn Thomas | Bressie | Rachel | Kian | Una |
| 5 | 2016 | Michael Lawson | Kelesa Mulcahy | Nigel Connell | Laura O’Connor | Bressie | Eoghan McDermott, Kathryn Thomas | Bressie | Rachel | Kian | Una |

== Reception ==
=== Series averages ===
| Series | Premiere date | Finale date | Episodes (inc. results shows) | Average Irish viewers (inc. results shows) |
|---|---|---|---|---|
| 1 | 8 January 2012 | 29 April 2012 | 25 | 597,222 |
| 2 | 6 January 2013 | 28 April 2013 | 17 | 599,411 |
| 3 | 5 January 2014 | 27 April 2014 | TBA | 575,767 |
| 4 | 4 January 2015 | 26 April 2015 | TBA | TBA |
| 5 | 3 January 2016 | 26 April 2016 | TBA | TBA |

=== Ratings ===
RTÉ described the first ever episode as "a great ratings success" as it pulled in an average of 708,000 viewers and peaked at 1.2 million. It was later reported that the first 5 episodes pulled in an average of 701,000 viewers a week.

Audience ratings for the first series, initially promising, had plunged by 50% by the time the live shows were broadcast and were reported to be unfavourable when compared to ratings held by its predecessor The All Ireland Talent Show.

== The Voice After Party ==
The Voice After Party is a spin-off show, discussing each show afterwards.

== Music releases by The Voice of Ireland contestants ==
As of July 2016, The Voice of Ireland has had thirteen singles and four albums chart on the top 100 on the Irish Singles and Albums Charts.

=== Singles ===
| Artist | Series | Position in show | Song title | IRE release date | IRE peak chart position | Ref(s) |
|---|---|---|---|---|---|---|
| Pat Byrne | 1 | Winner | "What a Wonderful World" | 23 April 2012 | 3 | |
| Richie Hayes | 1 | Runner-up | "One Voice" | 23 April 2012 | 23 | |
| Vanessa Whelan | 1 | Third place | "Who Wants to Live Forever" | 23 April 2012 | 28 | |
| Jim Devine | 1 | Fourth Place | "The Dance" | 23 April 2012 | – | |
| Pat Byrne | 1 | Winner | "End of the World" | 2 November 2012 | 61 | |
| Ryan O'Shaughnessy | 1 | Final 24 | "No Name" | 5 August 2012 | 3 | |
| Pat Byrne | 1 | Winner | "All or Nothing" | 15 March 2013 | 80 | |
| Kim Hayden | 1 | Final 8 | "Warrior" | 19 April 2013 | – | |
| Keith Hanley | 2 | Winner | "Beggin'" | 29 April 2013 | 37 | |
| Kelly Mongan | 2 | Runner-Up | "Sorry Seems to Be the Hardest Word" | 29 April 2013 | 67 | |
| Shannon Murphy | 2 | Fourth Place | "Ho Hey" | 29 April 2013 | 49 | |
| Ryan O'Shaughnessy | 1 | Final 24 | "Who Do You Love?" | 2 August 2013 | 3 | |
| Andrew Mann | 2 | Final 16 | "Middle of the Dancefloor" | 8 November 2013 | – | |
| Keith Hanley | 2 | Winner | "Blue" | 21 February 2014 | 29 | |
| Brendan McCahey | 3 | Winner | "You Can't Judge A Book by the Cover" | 17 April 2014 | 15 | |
| Keith Hanley | 2 | Winner | "Hush" | 30 May 2014 | – | |
| Brendan McCahey | 3 | Winner | "Sweet Love" | 31 October 2014 | 90 | |
| Brendan McCahey | 3 | Winner | "Safe and Well" | 10 April 2015 | – | |
| Patrick Donoghue | 4 | Winner | "Redemption Days" | 17 July 2015 | – | |
| Patrick Donoghue | 4 | Winner | "Judge My Love" | 8 April 2016 | – | |
| Michael Lawson | 5 | Winner | Revival | 15 July 2016 | – | |

=== Albums ===
| Artist | Series | Position in show | Album title | IRE release date | IRE peak chart position | Ref(s) |
|---|---|---|---|---|---|---|
| Pat Byrne | 1 | Winner | "All or Nothing" | 16 November 2012 | 10 | |
| Ryan O'Shaughnessy | 1 | Final 24 | "Ryan O'Shaughnessy" | 13 August 2012 | 1 | |
| Conor Quinn | 1 | Final 8 | "Golden Kids" | 20 August 2013 | – | |
| Andrew Mann | 2 | Final 16 | "Hidden in Plain Sight" | 31 December 2013 (re-release) | – | |
| Kim Hayden | 1 | Final 8 | "Better" | 14 February 2014 | – | |
| Keith Hanley | 2 | Winner | "Hush" | 7 March 2014 | 17 | |
| Brendan McCahey | 3 | Winner | "To Where I Begin" | 14 November 2014 | 20 | |
