= Patrick James (singer) =

Irish musician and recording artist

- Born: Patrick James Donoghue; Dublin, Ireland
- Genres: Jazz, soul, blues
- Occupation: Singer
- Instrument: Vocals
- Years active: 2015–present
- Label: Universal

Patrick James Donoghue is an Irish musician and recording artist. Originally from Dublin, Donoghue was a checkout worker at Dunnes Stores who rose to fame with winning series 4 of the talent show The Voice of Ireland, becoming the fourth consecutive male to win the title, as well as the first ever champion under new coach Una Foden of The Saturdays. Months after his success, he revealed to the public that he had changed his stage name to Patrick James, as he felt it suited him more as an artist.

== In The Voice of Ireland ==
Patrick Donoghue auditioned for series 4 of The Voice of Ireland singing "Red" from Daniel Merriweather turning all four chairs. He also was the first auditionee selected. He chose to be part of Team Una Foden. In the Battles round, he was paired with fellow contestant Kieran McKillop co-singing "You Give Me Something" and moved to Knockouts round singing "Mamma Knows Best" and was safe. In the quarter finals, he performed "Only Love Can Hurt Like This" and in the semi-final "Ain't Nobody" in both instances being saved by the public.

In the competition finals, he performed "Man in The Mirror" and a repetition of "Mamma Knows Best" and was crowned The Voice of Ireland 2015 on 26 April.

== Career ==
After winning, he announced he was going to use the name Patrick James. His debut single "Redemption Days", a cover of Josh Osho, premiered on The Anton Savage Show on Today FM on 17 June 2015. This was seen as an important change for The Voice of Ireland, as past winners were criticised for waiting too long for their release, alongside an album. The single was then released for digital download on 17 July. The song was promoted with a performance on Saturday Night with Miriam on 11 July 2015. Patrick says that he would like to release an album, but that the album's release depends on the success of "Redemption Days". He has stated that if he releases an album, he would definitely include a collaboration with The Voice coach Una Healy on it. With the song being a commercial failure, the album has not been released as of December 2015.

In March 2016, Patrick teased a snippet of an upcoming single titled "Judge My Love" via Snapchat. The song was released for digital download on 8 April 2016. It was written and co-produced by The Voice coach Bressie and promoted with a performance on The Voice of Ireland.

In July 2016, Irish group KBM confirmed that James would feature on an upcoming song of theirs. The song, titled "Come to Me" was released on 15 August.

In 2018, he auditioned for The X Factor but got eliminated in the first round.

== Discography ==
=== Singles ===
Year	Title	Peak chart positions
Year	Title	IRL
2015	"Mamma Knows Best"	-
2015	"Redemption Days"	-
2016	"Judge My Love"	-

Awards and achievements
Preceded by Brendan McCahey	The Voice of Ireland; Winner; 2015	Succeeded by Michael Lawson
