= Keith Hanley =

- Born: 15 August 1993 (age 32)
- Origin: Charleville, County Cork, Ireland
- Occupations: Singer, student
- Instrument: Vocals
- Years active: 2013–present
- Labels: Universal

Keith Hanley (born 15 August 1993) is an Irish singer from Charleville, County Cork and the winner of The Voice of Ireland series 2 on 28 April 2013. Hanley's coach on the show was R&B singer Jamelia who was making her debut season on the show. He won a recording contract with Universal Music after he performed his winning song "Beggin'". He also performed 'Jigsaw' with Ryan Sheridan that night.

== Career ==
=== 2013: The Voice of Ireland ===
Hanley auditioned for The Voice of Ireland in 2012, singing Beyoncé's "Listen" at the blind auditions. Bresie and Jamelia turned around but Hanley ultimately chose Jamelia as his coach. During the battle rounds, Hanley was pitted against Niamh Armstrong; they sang "Beneath Your Beautiful" after which Jamelia decided to send Hanley through to the live shows. For the second live show, Hanley sang "Beggin'". He was given a score of 38 by the judges and saved by the public vote. In week four, he sang "Shackles (Praise You)" and was safe with a judges score of 25. For the Top 10 live show Hanley sang "Get Here" and was sent through to the semi-final by public vote with a judges score of 23. For the semi-final Hanley sang "Crazy" and was sent through to the final. In the final he sang "Jigsaw" (with Ryan Sheridan) and "Beggin'" and was announced as the winner.

==== Performances on The Voice of Ireland ====
Show	Song choice	Result
Blind Auditions	"Listen"	Joined Team Jamelia^{[a]}
The Battle Round	"Beneath Your Beautiful" (Vs. Niamh Armstrong)	Sent through to the live shows by Jamelia
Live Show 2	"Beggin'"	Safe
Live Show 3	"Anything Could Happen"	—N/a^{[b]}
Live Show 4	"Shackles (Praise You)"	Through to Top 10
Top 10	"Get Here"	Safe
Semi-final	"Crazy"	Through to Final
Final	"Jigsaw" (with Ryan Sheridan)	Winner
Final	"Beggin'"	Winner

- ^{^[a]}Jamelia and Bressie turned around. Keith joined team Jamelia.
- ^{^[b]}Performed with Team Jamelia.

=== Debut album and other ventures ===
Hanley announced on 12 September 2013 via Facebook that he had finished recording his debut album. He announced on 5 January 2014 that his album would be released by Valentine's Day. He released his debut single "Blue" on 21 February 2014. His debut album Hush was released on 7 March 2014. The album's second single, also titled "Hush", was released on 30 May 2014. It was announced on 10 August 2014 that Hanley had been dropped from Universal Music after disappointing album sales.

Hanley announced his return to the recording studio via social media in September 2015, teasing new music coming soon. As of February 2018, no new material has been released.

Hanley still works a regular job, but also continues to gig and perform in pantomimes and other theatrical events.

It was announced in January 2018 that Hanley was in the running to represent Ireland in the 2018 Eurovision Song Contest, competing against former winners Pat Byrne and Brendan McCahey for the position.

== Discography ==
=== Albums ===
Title	Year	Peak chart positions
Title	Year	IRE
Hush	Released: 7 March 2014; Label: Universal Music; Formats: CD, digital download	17

=== Singles ===
Year	Title	Peak chart positions
Year	Title	IRL
2013	"Beggin'"	37
2014	"Blue"	29
2014	"Hush"	–

Awards and achievements
Preceded by Pat Byrne	The Voice of Ireland; Winner; 2013	Succeeded by Brendan McCahey
