= Pat Byrne (singer) =

- Born: October 1989 (age 36)
- Origin: Borris, County Carlow, Ireland
- Genres: Folk, Soul, Pop, Rock, Americana
- Occupations: Singer, Songwriter, musician, actor
- Instruments: Vocals, guitar, harmonica, drums
- Years active: 2012–present
- Label: Ginger House Music
- Website: www.PatByrne-music.com

Pat Byrne is an Irish singer songwriter from Borris, County Carlow. In 2012, Byrne was crowned the winner of the first series of The Voice of Ireland, which led to the release of his debut album, "All or Nothing." In January 2019, Byrne emigrated to Austin, Texas, after several previous visits to the city that included recording sessions for the album Rituals, released in October 2018. Byrne had well-received performances in 2019 at the 30A Festival, SXSW, Kerrville Folk Festival and Nashville's Americana Festival. In July 2021, Byrne released his third album, "Into the Light."

== Early life ==
From 2007 to 2011, Byrne formed several bands, among them, pop punk band called Mr Lightweight, and 'Moses Moorhouse and the Dinosaur Palace'. A desire to pursue music beyond these ventures led Byrne to audition for The Voice of Ireland.

Byrne has come a long way since winning the inaugural season of "The Voice of Ireland". "The Voice" was a learning experience that included both highs and lows. Making an album in three months meant writing new songs with some talented people, but also, in some ways, compromising on the art Byrne wanted to create. After the initial roar, things went back to normal and Byrne continued gigging around Ireland, UK and Europe; however, he had a new sense of confidence.

== Career ==
=== 2012: The Voice of Ireland ===
Byrne entered The Voice of Ireland in 2011, singing Bruce Springsteen's "The River" at the blind auditions. All four coaches turned around but Byrne ultimately chose Niall "Bressie" Breslin as his coach. During the battle rounds, Byrne was pitted against Dara Molloy; they sang "If It Makes You Happy" after which Bressie decided to send Byrne through to the live shows. For the first live show, Byrne sang "You Do Something to Me" and was saved by the public vote. In week three, he sang "Are You Gonna Be My Girl" and was safe. For the fifth live show Byrne sang "The Day We Caught the Train" and was sent through to the quarter-final by public vote. Before the final, his version of "What a Wonderful World" topped the iTunes charts in Ireland. Louis Walsh said he could crack America. On 29 April 2012, Byrne was crowned the winner of the first series.

- ^{^[a]}All four coaches turned around. Pat joined team Bressie.
- ^{^[b]}Pat Byrne was against Dara Malloy. Bressie sent Pat Byrne through to the Live Shows.
- ^{^[c]}Pat Byrne was in the bottom two with Kiera Byrne. Bressie chose to save Pat,
- ^{^[d]}Byrne's version of this song was released on iTunes. Each download counted as a vote for the final. It got to number 1 on the iTunes chart in Ireland.
- ^{^[e]}The songs the final four artists performed for the semi-final were released on iTunes. Each download counted as a vote for the final. Each coach had 100 points to divide between their two artists how they wished.

=== Studio albums: All or Nothing (2012), Rituals (2018), Into the Light (2021) ===
Pat Byrne released his album's debut single, titled "End of the World" on 2 November 2012, following the release of its music video on 30 October 2012. The single reached No.61 in the Irish Singles Charts. The album, titled "All or Nothing", was released on 22 November 2012 and reached No.10 in the Irish Album Charts. A second single from the album, also titled "All or Nothing", was released on 15 March 2013 and reached No. 80 in the charts. This followed the release of its music video on 8 March 2013.

Since the release of End of the World, Byrne has confirmed that he is still constantly gigging and writing new music in an interview in April 2015. He also announced in the same interview that he is no longer recording with Universal since 2014.

Byrne recorded his seven-song 2018 album "Rituals" partly in Ireland and partly in Austin, Texas, with producer Rich Brotherton. For his 2021 album "Into the Light," he worked with producer Billy Harvey at Nashville studio Sound Emporium with a supporting cast that included longtime John Prine bassist Dave Jacques and Sheryl Crow Drummer Fred Eltringham.

== Discography ==
=== Albums ===
- All or Nothing (2012)
- Rituals (2018)
- Live at Anderson Fair (2019)
- Into the Light (2021)

Awards and achievements
Preceded by N/A	The Voice of Ireland; Winner; 2012	Succeeded by Keith Hanley
