= Kian Egan =

Irish pop singer (born 1980)

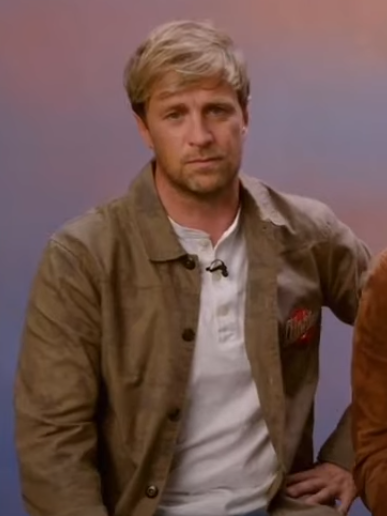
- Egan in 2021

Background information
- Born: Kian John Francis Egan; 29 April 1980 (age 46); Sligo, Ireland
- Genre: Pop
- Occupations: Singer; musician; songwriter
- Instruments: Vocals; guitar; piano
- Years active: 1997–present
- Labels: Syco; Sony; Rhino; Warner
- Member of: Westlife

Kian John Francis Egan (born 29 April 1980) is an Irish pop singer, songwriter, and musician. He is best known as a member of the pop group Westlife. Westlife have released twelve albums, embarked on thirteen world tours, and won numerous awards, becoming one of the most successful musical groups of all time. Egan was a judge and coach on The Voice of Ireland and won the thirteenth series of I'm a Celebrity...Get Me Out of Here! in 2013.

== Music career ==
=== 1997–2012: Westlife and Wonderland ===
In his early musical years, Egan was part of a rock band named Skrod. He can play at least five musical instruments, including guitar, piano, and drums. He is a grade 8 pianist and was taught piano by his brother Gavin Egan, a university music graduate and full-time teacher of music in the UK. Before he was in Westlife, Egan was part of a pop group called Six as One, which later changed its name to IOYOU, with fellow Westlife members Mark Feehily and Shane Filan, alongside Graham Keighron, Michael "Miggles" Garrett and Derrick Lacey.

After IOUYOU was signed by Louis Walsh, its lineup changed to include Egan, Mark Feehily, Shane Filan and two new members - Nicky Byrne and Brian McFadden. The band's name changed to Westside and later to Westlife. Westlife split up in 2012 after a Greatest Hits Tour.

During a year-long hiatus from Westlife in 2008, Egan launched a new venture with Louis Walsh to put together and co-manage girlband, Wonderland, which included Jodi Albert, who later became Egan's wife. Wonderland's debut album reached number 6 on the Irish Albums Chart and number 8 on the UK Albums Chart, however, just four months later, they were dropped by Mercury Records and eventually split up.

=== 2014: Home ===
In January 2014, Egan signed with Rhino Records of Warner Music Group, and his debut album Home was released on 14 March that year in Ireland, and on 17 March in the UK. His debut single "Home", a cover of a song by the band Daughtry, had its first exclusive play on BBC Radio 2 at lunchtime with Terry Wogan's show. The album has peaked at number 2 on the Irish Singles Chart and number 9 on the UK Albums Chart. In May 2014, Egan released the second single from the album, "I'll Be", a cover of the track by Edwin McCain.

=== 2018–present: Westlife reunion ===
In October 2018, Westlife announced the group's reunion as a four-piece. In 2019, the group headlined "The 20 Tour", named in honor of Westlife's 20th anniversary since its formation and the release of its first single, "Swear It Again", in 1999. In addition to touring, Westlife also released new music. "Hello My Love", the first single from the group's upcoming album, debuted on The Graham Norton Show in January 2019.

== Television career ==
Egan was one of four coaches on The Voice of Ireland. However, his dreams of winning the show went to tatters as he threw his lot in with Jim Devine, from Northern Ireland. This immediately put him at a disadvantage to the other contestants as, ahead of the final, viewers in Northern Ireland could not download his single, the tally of which contributed to his vote. Egan was left fuming and in need of support from Sharon Corr as he expressed his opinion on the unfairness of it all and had "huge rows" about it but to no avail.

In June 2012, Egan announced in an interview with the Sunday Life that he was "looking at doing a TV show with Sky on surfing". Later reports suggested that the show would be eight episodes long and would broadcast on Sky1 later in the year.

In July 2012, Egan presented the British program This Morning's Hub regularly, standing in for the regular hosts. Later that year, every Friday morning in October, he began giving reports on This Morning about the remaining contestants in the ninth series of The X Factor, before the competition's live shows that weekend.

On 21 October 2012, Egan co-presented the revamped version of Surprise Surprise, but did not return the following year.

In 2013, Egan appeared on the thirteenth series of I'm A Celebrity...Get Me Out Of Here!. He was ultimately crowned King Of The Jungle, which contributed to an invitation to being signed by Rhino Records to create his Home album.

From 5 to 9 January 2015, Egan and Angela Griffin co-hosted Fat Pets: Slimmer of the Year on ITV.

== Personal life ==
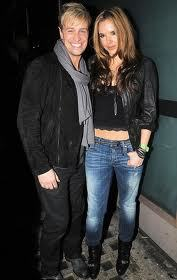
Egan with his wife Jodi Albert in 2012

Egan was born to Kevin Egan (1945–2009) and Patricia Egan (née Moore). He is the fifth of their seven children. His older siblings are Vivienne, Gavin, Fenella, and Thomas, and his younger siblings are Marielle and Colm. He attended Summerhill College secondary school in Sligo, where he met fellow band members Mark Feehily and Shane Filan. He is the cousin of Filan's wife, Gillian Walsh. Before Westlife, he worked at a jeans store.

Egan married English actress and Girl Thing and Wonderland member Jodi Albert on 8 May 2009. Due to illness, Egan's father was unable to attend the marriage ceremony after being diagnosed with a rare brain tumor and died shortly after. On 31 July 2011, the couple announced they were expecting their first child. Westlife's official Facebook page announced that Albert had given birth to a baby boy, Koa, on 20 December 2011. On 15 November 2014, the pair announced they were expecting their second child in the spring. On 21 May 2015, Egan and his wife welcomed a second son, Zekey. Their third son, Cobi, was born on 29 September 2017. The family lives in Strandhill, County Sligo.

Egan spoke of the 2010 FIFA World Cup in South Africa but said he would not go after the Republic of Ireland national football team was eliminated from the tournament after Thierry Henry's handball.

Egan was ranked number three on Ireland's Sexiest Man of 2014. As of 2017, his net worth is 18 million euros.

== Discography ==
=== Studio albums ===
Title	Album details	Peak chart positions		
Title	Album details	IRE	UK	SCO
Home	Released: 14 March 2014; Labels: Rhino Entertainment / Warner Music Group; Formats: Digital download	2	9	6

=== Singles ===
Year	Title	Peak chart positions		Album
Year	Title	IRE	UK	Album
2014	"Home"	89	156	Home
2014	"I'll Be"	—	71	Home
"—" denotes a single that did not chart.

== Selected filmography ==
Television

Year	Title	Role	Notes
2010	Louis Walsh & Kian Egan's Next Big Thing – Wonderland	Co-star	With Louis Walsh
2012–2016	The Voice of Ireland	Coach/Judge	
2012–2014	This Morning	Hub presenter and reporter	
2012	Surprise Surprise	Reporter	
2013	I'm a Celebrity...Get Me Out of Here!	Contestant	Won the series
2015	Fat Pets: Slimmer of the Year	Presenter	With Angela Griffin

Guest appearances

- Alan Carr's Celebrity Ding Dong (31 October 2008) – Guest
- Lorraine (15 November 2010, 7 March 2011) – Guest
- Celebrity Juice (23 December 2010, 5 April 2012, 13 March 2014) – Panellist
- Loose Women (14 November 2011) – Guest
- Daybreak (9 November 2012) – Guest
- Fake Reaction (24 January 2013) – Guest
- 8 Out of 10 Cats (8 February 2013) – Panellist
- Your Face Sounds Familiar (27 July 2013) – Guest judge
- Who Wants to Be a Millionaire? (19 December 2013) – Contestant with Rebecca Adlington
- The Cube: Celebrity Special (22 February 2014) – Contestant
- The Wright Stuff (28 March 2014) – Panellist
- The Guess List (3 May 2014) – Guest
- Sunday Brunch (4 May 2014) – Guest
- Weekend (10 May 2014) – Guest
- TV OD (5 June 2014) – Guest
- All Star Mr & Mrs (25 June 2014) – Contestant
- Through the Keyhole (20 September 2014) – Panellist
- Would I Lie to You? (26 September 2014) – Panellist

== Honours and awards ==
Year	Ceremony	Category	Result
2000	Smash Hits Awards	Best Haircut	Won

Preceded by Charlie Brooks	I'm a Celebrity... Get Me Out of Here! Winner and King of the Jungle; 2013	Succeeded by Carl Fogarty
