= 2011 in Irish music =

This is a summary of the year 2011 in the Irish music industry.

== Summary ==
- On Wednesday 12 January, the Choice Music Prize nominations for Best Irish Album of 2010 were announced.
- On Thursday 3 February, the inaugural Digital Socket Awards were held at the Grand Social, Dublin.
- On Thursday 3 March, Two Door Cinema Club's debut album Tourist History was awarded the Choice Music Prize for Best Irish Album of 2010 at a ceremony at Vicar Street, Dublin. The event was broadcast live on Today FM and supported by IMRO and IRMA.
- In February, the nominations for the 2011 Meteor Awards were scheduled to be announced, with the main event to take place in March 2011, but the entire event was cancelled completely when Meteor cancelled its sponsorship.
- On 28 May, Kings of Leon headlined a sold-out 30th anniversary Slane Concert.
- On 2 July, The Script performed their first stadium headlining concert at the Aviva Stadium.
- From 8–11 July, Oxegen 2011 took place, with headline acts Arctic Monkeys, Black Eyed Peas and Foo Fighters.
- On 19 October, Westlife officially announced they were splitting after an album and a tour.
- On 6 November, Belfast's Odyssey Arena hosted the 2011 MTV Europe Music Awards.
- On 21 November 2011, nominees were announced for the Irish Music Television Awards. The awards ceremony took place at The Sugar Club in Dublin on 28 November 2011.
- On 21 December 2011, MCD confirmed Oxegen 2012 would not take place but said that Oxegen 2013 would take place.
- The Royseven song "We Should Be Lovers", taken from the album You Say, We Say, was the most played Irish song on radio in 2011.

== Albums & EPs ==
Below is a list of notable albums & EPs released by Irish artists in Ireland in 2011.

Issue date	Album title	Artist	Source	Sales	Notes
March	You Say, We Say	Royseven			
April	No Is Not An Answer	Mike Got Spiked			
April	Leaving My Empire	Fred			
May	Marcata	The Minutes			
May	Indian Summer	Zombie Computer			
May	Let It Break	Gemma Hayes			
December	Frozen Bones	Window Seats			

== Singles ==
Below is a list of notable singles released by Irish artists in Ireland in 2011.

Issue date	Single title	Artist	Source	Sales	Notes
January 16, 2011	"Inside Out"	Imelda May			
January 24, 2011	"What You Know"	Two Door Cinema Club			
February 11, 2011	"We Should Be Lovers"	Royseven			
February 25, 2011	"I Wanna Fight Your Father"	The Rubberbandits			
March 25, 2011	"Light Shape Sound"	Miracle Bell			
March 25, 2011	"Black Keys"	The Minutes			

== Festivals ==
=== Oxegen 2011 ===
- Foo Fighters
- Arctic Monkeys
- Blink-182
- Paolo Nutini
- The Black Eyed Peas

=== Slane 2011 ===
- Kings of Leon

== Awards ==
=== IMTV Awards 2011 ===
The 2011 Irish Music Television Awards took place at The Sugar Club in Dublin on 28 November 2011. Below are the winners:

Award	Artist(s)	Video	Director(s)
Best Group	The Minutes	"Black Keys"	Biba Logan
Most Original Concept	Ham Sandwich	"ANTS"	Marc Corrigan
Best Male Video	James Vincent McMorrow	"Sparrow and the Wolf"	John Phillipson, Elton Mullally, Rob Davis
Best Female Video	Lisa Hannigan	"Knots"	Myles O’Reilly
Best Live Video	The Minutes	"IMTOD"	Simon Eustace
Best Styled Video	I Draw Slow	"Goldmine"	Rory Bresnihan
Sexiest Video	Echogram	"Conspiracy"	Shaun O’Connor
Best Production Effects	Funeral Suits	"Florida"	Jonathan Irwin
Best Director	–	–	Vincent Gallagher
Viewers' Choice	King Kong Company	"Acetate"	John Loftus
Video of the Year	Lisa Hannigan	"Little Bird"	Myles O’Reilly
