= The Voice of Ireland series 1 =

Season of television series

The Voice of Ireland
- Series 1
- Coaches: Niall Breslin; Kian Egan; Sharon Corr; Brian Kennedy
- Winner: Pat Byrne
- Winning coach: Bressie
- Runner-up: Richie Hayes

Release
- Original network: RTÉ One
- Original release: 8 January – 29 April 2012

Series chronology
- Next → Series 2

The Voice of Ireland is an Irish reality talent show. It began airing on 8 January 2012. It replaced The All Ireland Talent Show. The Voice of Ireland aired on RTÉ One. Kathryn Thomas presented the main show, while Eoghan McDermott co-presented. Bressie, Kian Egan, Sharon Corr and Brian Kennedy were the coaches. Pat Byrne, mentored by Bressie, won the series.

Auditions for this series took place at the end of 2011. The Blind Auditions took place at The Helix, Dublin, between 26 and 31 October in front of a live audience. On Thursday, 24 November and Friday, 25 November, each coach's artists performed at The Helix for The Battle Rounds. The Live Shows began on 4 March. This series included Lucy O'Byrne, who would later appear as runner-up on the British series of The Voice.

== Teams ==
Winner
Runner-up
Third place
Fourth place
Eliminated in the Live shows
Eliminated in the Battles

Coaches	Top 48 artists					
Brian Kennedy						
Brian Kennedy	Ryan O'Shaughnessy	Claire O'Loughlin	Sinead Fox	Brendan Keeley	Alan Fitzsimons	Richie Hayes
Brian Kennedy	Colin Hand	Angela Shanny	Lindsay Hamilton	Neil McGrath	Lata McCarthy	Conor Ryan
Kian Egan						
Kian Egan	Kyle Kennedy	Graham Dowling	Elliot Canavan Doyle	Liam Geddes	Sharon Gaynor	Jim Devine
Kian Egan	Lucy O'Byrne	Sandra Jane Hyland	Christina Foran	Stephen Griffin	Siobhan McKenna	Lorna Jordan
Sharon Corr						
Sharon Corr	Fauve Chapman	Kellie Blaise	Nollaig O'Connor	Kevin Keeley	Kim Hayden	Vanessa Whelan
Sharon Corr	Onya Gray	Kate Donohoe	Alan Lawlor	Ingrid Madsen	Alibhne Hession	Dan Twomey
Bressie						
Bressie	Gavin Kenny	Jessica Pritzel	Gari Deegan	Kiera Byrne	Conor Quinn	Pat Byrne
Bressie	Rory Quinn	Kate Gilmore	Dervla Magennis	Carolann Haskins	Nikita O'Rowe	Dara Molloy

== Blind Auditions ==
The Blind Auditions took place at The Helix, Dublin, between 26 and 31 October in front of a live audience. The coaches choose teams of artists through a blind audition process. Each coach has the length of the artists' performance to decide if they want that artist on their team. Should two or more coaches want the same artist, then the artist gets to choose their coach. Once the coaches have picked their team, they are to pit them against each other in the ultimate sing off; The Battles.

Color key
✔ Coach hit his/her "I WANT YOU" button
Artist defaulted to this coach's team
Artist elected to join this coach's team
Artist eliminated with no coach pressing his or her "I WANT YOU" button

=== Blind Auditions 1 ===
Order	Artist	Song	Coaches' and artists' choices			
Order	Artist	Song	Bressie	Sharon	Kian	Brian
1	Onya Gray	"Running Up That Hill"	✔	✔		✔
2	Darren Bates	"Patience"				
3	Kate Donohoe	"Mustang Sally"		✔		
4	Conor Quinn	"9 Crimes"	✔			
5	Kim Burke	"Price Tag"				
6	Chris Currid	"I Believe in a Thing Called Love"				
7	Christina Foran	"Go Your Own Way"		✔	✔	
8	Angela Shanny	"Listen"				✔
9	Gavin Kenny	"Hurt"	✔			
10	Dan Twomey	"Nella Fantasia"		✔		
11	Gari Deegan	"Forget You"	✔	✔		✔
12	Sinead Fox	"Smile"			✔	✔
13	Stephen Griffin	"Everything"			✔	
14	Tara Blaise	"Livin' on a Prayer"				

=== Blind Auditions 2 ===
Order	Artist	Song	Coaches' and artists' choices			
Order	Artist	Song	Bressie	Sharon	Kian	Brian
1	Nikita O'Rowe	"Never Forget You"	✔	✔		✔
2	Laura Rice	"Dynamite"				
3	Conor Ryan	"At Last"	✔	✔	✔	✔
4	Liam Geddes	"The First Time Ever I Saw Your Face"		✔	✔	✔
5	Leighann Mitchell	"Firework"				
6	Jessica Pritzel	"Billie Jean"	✔	✔		
7	Richie Hayes (Son)	"I Wish"				✔
8	Dick Hayes (Father)	"Wind Beneath My Wings"				
9	Ailbhne Hession	"I'll Be There"		✔		
10	Dara Molloy	"I Will Always Love You"	✔			
11	Neil McGrath	"Use Somebody"				✔
12	Brían Doyle	"Your Song"				
13	Kellie Blaise	"Fallin'"		✔		
14	Siobhan McKenna	"Listen"			✔	✔

=== Blind Auditions 3 ===
Order	Artist	Song	Coaches' and artists' choices			
Order	Artist	Song	Bressie	Sharon	Kian	Brian
1	Emma Jane Reilly	"Halo"				
2	Rory Quinn	"Man in the Mirror"	✔			
3	Annie Gribbin	"The Island"				
4	Nollaig O'Connor	"With or Without You"	✔	✔	✔	✔
5	Emma Wigglesworth	"You Got the Love"				
6	Lucy O'Byrne	"Smile"			✔	
7	Mike Bartlett	"All I Want Is You"				
8	Vanessa Whelan	"Rule the World"		✔	✔	✔
9	Lindsay Hamilton	"Faith"				✔
10	Lorna Jordan	"Summer Fly"		✔	✔	
11	Brendan Keeley	"Sometimes When We Touch"				✔
12	Sandra Jane Hyland	"Imagine"	✔		✔	
13	Ellie McMahon	"Black and Gold"				
14	Lata McCarthy	"Nella Fantasia"				✔
15	Kiera Byrne	"Ride On"	✔			

=== Blind Auditions 4 ===
Order	Artist	Song	Coaches' and artists' choices			
Order	Artist	Song	Bressie	Sharon	Kian	Brian
1	Megan O'Riordan	"Price Tag"/"Where Is the Love?"				
2	Alan Lawlor	"Everything"		✔	✔	✔
3	Olivia Luc	"True Colors"				
4	Claire O'Loughlin	"Alone"				✔
5	Liam McCarthy	"Forget You"				
6	Joanne McGrath	"Killing Me Softly with His Song"				
7	Pat Byrne	"The River"	✔	✔	✔	✔
8	Fauve Chapman	"Wonderwall"		✔		
9	Jim Devine	"Better"			✔	
10	Brian Masterson	"Mustang Sally"				
11	Graham Dowling	"Come Together"			✔	
12	Ryan O'Shaughnessy	"The Power of Love"				✔
13	Kevin Keeley	"Travelin' Soldier"		✔		
14	Kate Gilmore	"Use Somebody"	✔			

=== Blind Auditions 5 ===
Order	Artist	Song	Coaches' and artists' choices			
Order	Artist	Song	Bressie	Sharon	Kian	Brian
1	Ellen Maguire	"Beautiful Disaster"				
2	Carolann Haskins	"Last Name"	✔			
3	Elliot Canavan Doyle	"9 Crimes"		✔	✔	✔
4	Kyle Kennedy	"Just the Way You Are"			✔	
5	Nicole Chaney	"Flashdance... What a Feeling"				
6	Jenny McCabe	"Hurt"				
7	Alan Fitzsimons	"True Colors"	✔			✔
8	Fearghal Kelly	"Cry Me a River"				
9	Kim Hayden	"I Will Always Love You"		✔		
10	Dervla Magennis	"At Last"	✔			✔
11	Eric Campbell	"Don't Stop Believin'"	—N/a			
12	Sharon Gaynor	"Think"	—N/a		✔	
13	Joe Kavanagh	"Nella Fantasia"	—N/a		—N/a	
14	Ingrid Madsen	"I Can't Make You Love Me"	—N/a	✔	—N/a	
15	Colin Hand	"Smile"	—N/a	—N/a	—N/a	✔

== Battles ==
On Thursday, 24 November and Friday, 25 November, each coach's artists performed at The Helix for The Battle Rounds. Each team of artists were mentored and developed by their coach. In this stage, two artists from the same team, battle against each other by singing the same song, with the coach choosing which artist to send through to the live shows.

Color key
Artist won the Battle and advances to the Live shows
Artist lost the Battle and was eliminated

Coach	Adviser	Artists					
Bressie	Ruth-Anne Cunningham	Dara Molloy	Gavin Kenny	Jessica Pritzel	Dervla Magennis	Conor Quinn	Carolann Haskins
Bressie	Ruth-Anne Cunningham	Pat Byrne	Rory Quinn	Kate Gilmore	Gari Deegan	Nikita O'Rowe	Kiera Byrne
Sharon Corr	Don Mescall	Kate Donohoe	Dan Twomey	Ingrid Madsen	Ailbhne Hession	Alan Lawlor	Fauve Chapman
Sharon Corr	Don Mescall	Kellie Blaise	'Vanessa Whelan	Kevin Keeley	Kim Hayden	Nollaig O'Connor	Onya Gray
Kian Egan	Priscilla Samuels	Liam Geddes	Graham Dowling	Sharon Gaynor	Kyle Kennedy	Christina Foran	Jim Devine
Kian Egan	Priscilla Samuels	Stephen Griffin	Sandra Jane Hyland	Siobhan McKenna	Lucy O'Byrne	Elliot Canavan Doyle	Lorna Jordan
Brian Kennedy	Eddi Reader	Alan Fitzsimons	Lindsay Hamilton	Brendan Keeley	Angela Shanny	Colin Hand	Conor Ryan
Brian Kennedy	Eddi Reader	Lata McCarthy	Sinead Fox	Neil McGrath	Claire O'Loughlin	Ryan O'Shaughnessy	Richie Hayes

=== Battles 1 ===
Order	Coach	Winner	Song	Loser
1	Kian Egan	Liam Geddes	"Yellow"	Stephen Griffin
2	Bressie	Pat Byrne	"If It Makes You Happy"	Dara Molloy
3	Brian Kennedy	Alan Fitzsimons	"Everybody Hurts"	Lata McCarthy
4	Sharon Corr	Kellie Blaise	"Shout"	Kate Donohoe
5	Bressie	Gavin Kenny	"Everlasting Love"	Rory Quinn
6	Kian Egan	Graham Dowling	"Moves like Jagger"	Sandra Jane Hyland
7	Brian Kennedy	Sinead Fox	"I Try"	Lindsay Hamilton
8	Sharon Corr	Vanessa Whelan	"Con te partirò"	Dan Twomey

=== Battles 2 ===
Order	Coach	Winner	Song	Loser
1	Kian Egan	Sharon Gaynor	"Don't Let the Sun Go Down on Me"	Siobhan McKenna
2	Sharon Corr	Kevin Keeley	"Need You Now"	Ingrid Madsen
3	Bressie	Jessica Pritzel	"My Immortal"	Kate Gilmore
4	Brian Kennedy	Brendan Keeley	"Dirty Old Town"	Neil McGrath
5	Bressie	Gari Deegan	"Don't Upset the Rhythm (Go Baby Go)"	Dervla Magennis
6	Brian Kennedy	Claire O'Loughlin	"Nothing Compares 2 U"	Angela Shanny
7	Kian Egan	Kyle Kennedy	"When You Tell Me That You Love Me"	Lucy O'Byrne
8	Sharon Corr	Kim Hayden	"Sober"	Ailbhne Hession

=== Battles 3 ===
Order	Coach	Winner	Song	Loser
1	Sharon Corr	Nollaig O'Connor	"Wild Horses"	Alan Lawlor
2	Bressie	Conor Quinn	"How to Save a Life"	Nikita O'Rowe
3	Brian Kennedy	Ryan O'Shaughnessy	"One"	Colin Hand
4	Kian Egan	Elliot Canavan Doyle	"Creep"	Christina Foran
5	Sharon Corr	Fauve Chapman	"Born This Way"	Onya Gray
6	Brian Kennedy	Richie Hayes	"Crazy Love"	Conor Ryan
7	Kian Egan	Jim Devine	"I Can't Make You Love Me"	Lorna Jordan
8	Bressie	Kiera Byrne	"Standing in the Way of Control"	Carolann Haskins

== Live shows ==
The Live Shows began on 4 March. The remaining artists competed against each other in live TV broadcasts at The Helix, with the viewers helping decide who advances and who exits the competition. When one artist remains for each coach, the artists will compete against each other in the finale on 29 April. The winner of the show will become The Voice of Ireland and get offered a contract with Universal Music worth €100,000.

=== Results summary ===
Artist's info

Artist from Team Bressie
Artist from Team Brian

Artist from Team Sharon
Artist from Team Kian

Result details

Winner

Runner-up
Third place
Fourth place
Artist advanced to the finals
Artist received the fewest accumulated total points and was eliminated

Artist was saved by the public
Artist was saved by his/her coach
Artist was in the bottom two
Artist received the fewest of the public's vote and was eliminated
Artist did not perform on that particular week

Artist	Week 1	Week 2	Week 3	Week 4	Week 5	Week 6	Quarter-Final	Semi-Final	Final
Pat Byrne	Safe		Safe		Safe		Public's choice	Safe	Winner
Richie Hayes	Safe		Safe		Safe		Public's choice	Safe	Runner-up
Vanessa Whelan		Safe		Safe		Safe	Public's choice	Safe	Third place
Jim Devine		Safe		Safe		Safe	Public's choice	Safe	Fourth place
Conor Quinn	Safe		Safe		Safe		Bressie's choice	Eliminated	Eliminated (Semi-final)
Kim Hayden		Safe		Safe		Bottom two	Sharon's choice	Eliminated	Eliminated (Semi-final)
Sharon Gaynor		Safe		Safe		Bottom two	Kian's choice	Eliminated	Eliminated (Semi-final)
Alan Fitzsimons	Safe		Bottom two		Bottom two		Brian's choice	Eliminated	Eliminated (Semi-final)
Brendan Keeley	Safe		Safe		Safe		Eliminated	Eliminated (Week 7)	
Kiera Byrne	Safe		Bottom two		Bottom two		Eliminated	Eliminated (Week 7)	
Kevin Keeley		Safe		Bottom two		Safe	Eliminated	Eliminated (Week 7)	
Liam Geddes		Safe		Bottom two		Safe	Eliminated	Eliminated (Week 7)	
Nollaig O'Connor		Safe		Safe		Eliminated	Eliminated (Week 6)		
Elliot Canavan Doyle		Bottom two		Safe		Eliminated	Eliminated (Week 6)		
Sinead Fox	Bottom two		Safe		Eliminated	Eliminated (Week 5)			
Gari Deegan	Safe		Safe		Eliminated	Eliminated (Week 5)			
Kellie Blaise		Bottom two		Eliminated	Eliminated (Week 4)				
Graham Dowling		Safe		Eliminated	Eliminated (Week 4)				
Claire O'Loughlin	Safe		Eliminated	Eliminated (Week 3)					
Jessica Pritzel	Bottom two		Eliminated	Eliminated (Week 3)					
Fauve Chapman		Eliminated	Eliminated (Week 2)						
Kyle Kennedy		Eliminated	Eliminated (Week 2)						
Ryan O'Shaughnessy	Eliminated	Eliminated (Week 1)							
Gavin Kenny	Eliminated	Eliminated (Week 1)							

=== Live show details ===
Artist was saved by the public's vote
Artist was part of the bottom group in his/her team and saved by his/her coach
Artist was eliminated

==== Live Show 1 (4 March) ====
- Guest performer: Royseven ("We Should Be Lovers")
- Teams competing: Team Bressie and Team Brian

Artists' performances on the first live show
Order	Coach	Artist	Song	Result
1	Brian Kennedy	Alan Fitzsimons	"Purple Rain"	Safe
2	Bressie	Gari Deegan	"The Tracks of My Tears"	Safe
3	Brian Kennedy	Sinead Fox	"Shine"	Bottom two
4	Bressie	Kiera Byrne	"Titanium"	Safe
5	Brian Kennedy	Richie Hayes	"What About Me"	Safe
6	Bressie	Conor Quinn	"Feeling Good"	Safe
7	Brian Kennedy	Ryan O'Shaughnessy	"Baby"	Eliminated
8	Bressie	Gavin Kenny	"Smooth"	Eliminated
9	Brian Kennedy	Claire O'Loughlin	"Un-Break My Heart"	Safe
10	Bressie	Jessica Pritzel	"Something"	Bottom two
11	Brian Kennedy	Brendan Keeley	"The Whole of the Moon"	Safe
12	Bressie	Pat Byrne	"You Do Something to Me"	Safe

==== Live Show 2 (11 March) ====
- Coaches performance: "Wake Up" (Performed by all four coaches)
- Guest performer: Bressie ("Breaking My Fall")
- Teams competing: Team Sharon and Team Kian

Artists' performances on the second live show
Order	Coach	Artist	Song	Result
1	Kian Egan	Elliot Canavan Doyle	"Take On Me"	Bottom two
2	Sharon Corr	Fauve Chapman	"Video Games"	Eliminated
3	Kian Egan	Graham Dowling	"Sex on Fire"	Safe
4	Sharon Corr	Kellie Blaise	"My Funny Valentine"	Bottom two
5	Kian Egan	Kyle Kennedy	"Superstition"	Eliminated
6	Sharon Corr	Kim Hayden	"Fix You"	Safe
7	Kian Egan	Sharon Gaynor	"All by Myself"	Safe
8	Sharon Corr	Keven Keeley	"Crossfire"	Safe
9	Kian Egan	Jim Devine	"Time After Time"	Safe
10	Sharon Corr	Vanessa Whelan	"Somewhere"	Safe
11	Kian Egan	Liam Geddes	"Love the Way You Lie (Part II)"	Safe
12	Sharon Corr	Nollaig O'Connor	"Shake It Out"	Safe

==== Live Show 3 (18 March) ====
- Guest performer: Rizzle Kicks ("Mama Do the Hump")
- Teams competing: Team Brian and Team Bressie
- Team performance: Brian Kennedy and Team Brian ("Life Love and Happiness")

Artists' performances on the third live show
Order	Coach	Artist	Song	Result
1	Bressie	Pat Byrne	"Are You Gonna Be My Girl"	Safe
2	Brian Kennedy	Brendan Keeley	"You Are So Beautiful"	Safe
3	Brian Kennedy	Alan Fitzsimons	"The Edge of Glory"	Bottom two
4	Bressie	Gari Deegan	"Next to Me"	Safe
5	Brian Kennedy	Claire O'Loughlin	"Love Is a Battlefield"	Eliminated
6	Bressie	Jessica Pritzel	"Walking on Broken Glass"	Eliminated
7	Brian Kennedy	Sinead Fox	"Beautiful"	Safe
8	Bressie	Kiera Byrne	"Stay"	Bottom two
9	Brian Kennedy	Richie Hayes	"Kiss"	Safe
10	Bressie	Conor Quinn	"Lonely Boy"	Safe

==== Live Show 4 (25 March) ====
- Guest performer: Pixie Lott ("Kiss the Stars")
- Teams competing: Team Kian and Team Sharon
- Team performance: Sharon Corr and Team Sharon ("Sweet Dreams (Are Made of This)")

Artists' performances on the fourth live show
Order	Coach	Artist	Song	Result
1	Kian Egan	Sharon Gaynor	"If I Ain't Got You"	Safe
2	Sharon Corr	Kevin Keeley	"Half the World Away"	Bottom two
3	Kian Egan	Jim Devine	"We Found Love"	Safe
4	Sharon Corr	Kim Hayden	"Mercy"	Safe
5	Kian Egan	Elliot Canavan Doyle	"Falling Slowly"	Safe
6	Sharon Corr	Nollaig O'Connor	"Will You Love Me Tomorrow"	Safe
7	Kian Egan	Liam Geddes	"Run"	Bottom two
8	Sharon Corr	Vanessa Whelan	"Pie Jesu"	Safe
9	Sharon Corr	Kellie Blaise	"Mama Do (Uh Oh, Uh Oh)"	Eliminated
10	Kian Egan	Graham Dowling	"Let Me Entertain You"	Eliminated

==== Live Show 5 (1 April) ====
- Guest performer: Olly Murs ("Oh My Goodness")
- Teams competing: Team Bressie and Team Brian
- Team performance: Bressie and Team Bressie ("All Day and All of the Night")

Artists' performances on the fifth live show
Order	Coach	Artist	Song	Result
1	Brian Kennedy	Brendan Keeley	"Walking in Memphis"	Safe
2	Bressie	Gari Deegan	"Lately"	Eliminated
3	Brian Kennedy	Alan Fitzsimons	"Without You"	Bottom two
4	Bressie	Conor Quinn	"Kids"	Safe
5	Brian Kennedy	Sinead Fox	"I Love Rock 'n' Roll"	Eliminated
6	Bressie	Pat Byrne	"The Day We Caught the Train"	Safe
7	Brian Kennedy	Richie Hayes	"To Love Somebody"	Safe
8	Bressie	Kiera Byrne	"Just a Girl"	Bottom two

==== Live Show 6 (8 April) ====
- Guest performer: Brian Kennedy ("Best Days")
- Teams competing: Team Kian and Team Sharon
- Team performance: Kian Egan and Team Kian ("More Than Words")

Artists' performances on the sixth live show
Order	Coach	Artist	Song	Result
1	Sharon Corr	Kim Hayden	"Johnny Got a Boom Boom"	Bottom two
2	Kian Egan	Liam Geddes	"Flying Without Wings"	Safe
3	Sharon Corr	Vanessa Whelan	"My Heart Will Go On"	Safe
4	Kian Egan	Jim Devine	"Over the Rainbow"	Safe
5	Sharon Corr	Nollaig O'Connor	"Addicted to Love"	Eliminated
6	Kian Egan	Elliot Canavan Doyle	"Iris"	Eliminated
7	Sharon Corr	Kevin Keeley	"What Hurts the Most"	Safe
8	Kian Egan	Sharon Gaynor	"Queen of the Night"	Bottom two

==== Quarter-Final (15 April) ====
- Guest performer: The Coronas ("Mark My Words")
- Teams competing: Team Bressie, Team Brian, Team Kian, and Team Sharon

Artists' performances on the quarter-final
Order	Coach	Artist	Song	Result
1	Bressie	Conor Quinn	"Rocks"	Bressie's choice
2	Kian Egan	Sharon Gaynor	"Hallelujah"	Kian's choice
3	Sharon Corr	Vanessa Whelan	"Nessun dorma"	Public vote
4	Brian Kennedy	Brendan Keeley	"I'll Always Be Lonely" (original song)	Eliminated
5	Kian Egan	Liam Geddes	"Heaven"	Eliminated
6	Sharon Corr	Kim Hayden	"Everytime"	Sharon's choice
7	Brian Kennedy	Richie Hayes	"I Don't Want to Miss a Thing"	Public vote
8	Kian Egan	Jim Devine	"I'm Already There"	Public vote
9	Bressie	Kiera Byrne	"Danny Boy"	Eliminated
10	Bressie	Pat Byrne	"With a Little Help from My Friends"	Public vote
11	Brian Kennedy	Alan Fitzsimons	"If You're Not the One"	Brian's choice
12	Sharon Corr	Kevin Keeley	"Marry You"	Eliminated

==== Semi-final (22 April) ====
- Guest performers: Professor Green ("Remedy") and Maverick Sabre ("Let Me Go")
- Teams competing: Team Bressie, Team Brian, Team Kian, and Team Sharon

On 22 April 2012, the final four were announced based on a mix of Public's vote and voting of coaches. Both carried equal weight of 100 points for a total of 200 points. The coaches delivered their points in closed envelopes at the end of the live semi-final round. After counting of the Public's votes and adding the coaches', the Final 4 were: Vanessa Whelan, Richie Hayes, Jim Devine, and Pat Byrne, who moved on to the final. The song they performed this week was then available to download on iTunes and each download counted as a vote for the final.

Order	Coach	Artist	Song	Points			Result
Order	Coach	Artist	Song	Coach points	Public points	Total points	Result
1	Sharon Corr	Vanessa Whelan	"Who Wants to Live Forever"	65	65	130	Advanced to Finals
2	Sharon Corr	Kim Hayden	"Something's Got a Hold on Me"	35	35	70	Eliminated
3	Brian Kennedy	Richie Hayes	"One Voice"	45	60	105	Advanced to Finals
4	Brian Kennedy	Alan Fitzsimons	"To Where You Are"	55	40	95	Eliminated
5	Kian Egan	Sharon Gaynor	"Open Arms"	30	65	95	Eliminated
6	Kian Egan	Jim Devine	"The Dance"	70	35	105	Advanced to Finals
7	Bressie	Conor Quinn	"Everlong"	60	35	95	Eliminated
8	Bressie	Pat Byrne	"What a Wonderful World"	40	65	105	Advanced to Finals

==== Final (29 April) ====
- Guest performer: Alexandra Burke ("Let It Go")
- Teams competing: Team Bressie, Team Brian, Team Kian, and Team Sharon
- Group performance: The finalists & coaches ("Pride (In the Name of Love)") and The finalists ("A Little Less Conversation")

Artists' performances on the final
Order	Artist	Coach	song	Result
1	Pat Byrne	Bressie	"The River"	Winner
2	Jim Devine	Kian Egan	"I'm Already There"	Fourth place
3	Vanessa Whelan	Sharon Corr	"Rule the World"	Third place
4	Richie Hayes	Brian Kennedy	"What About Me"	Runner-up

== Ratings ==
#	Episode	Air Date	Ratings
1	Blind Auditions 1	8 January 2012	708,000
2	Blind Auditions 2	15 January 2012	625,000
3	Blind Auditions 3	22 January 2012	623,000
4	Blind Auditions 4	29 January 2012	635,000
5	Blind Auditions 5	5 February 2012	628,000
6	Battle Rounds 1	12 February 2012	—
7	Battle Rounds 2	19 February 2012	581,000
8	Battle Rounds 3	26 February 2012	571,000
9	Live Show 1	4 March 2012	—
10	Live Results 1	4 March 2012	—
11	Live Show 2	11 March 2012	553,000
12	Live Results 2	11 March 2012	—
13	Live Show 3	18 March 2012	—
14	Live Results 3	18 March 2012	—
15	Live Show 4	25 March 2012	451,000
16	Live Results 4	25 March 2012	—
17	Live Show 5	1 April 2012	—
18	Live Results 5	1 April 2012	—
19	Live Show 6	8 April 2012	—
20	Live Results 6	8 April 2012	—
21	Quarter-Final	15 April 2012	—
22	Quarter-Final Results	15 April 2012	—
23	Semi-Final	22 April 2012	—
24	Semi-Final Results	22 April 2012	—
25	Final	29 April 2012	—
