= Oxegen 2011 =

Music festival in Ireland

- Oxegen 2011 logo
- Genre: Rock
- Dates: 7–10 July 2011
- Locations: Punchestown Racecourse, County Kildare, Ireland
- Previous event: Oxegen 2010
- Next event: Oxegen 2013
- Website: www.OXEGEN.ie

Oxegen 2011 was the eighth Oxegen festival to take place since 2004. It took place on the weekend of Friday 8 July, Saturday, 9 July and Sunday, 10 July at Punchestown Racecourse near Naas in County Kildare, Ireland. Arctic Monkeys, Beyoncé, Black Eyed Peas, Coldplay, Foo Fighters and The Strokes were among the headlining acts. On the final night of the festival Christy Moore came on stage to sing with headliners Coldplay at the end of their set.

== Tickets ==
Early bird tickets were released for purchase on 15 December 2010, with a four-day camping pass available with a discount of €25. General tickets were scheduled to go on sale in March 2011, and did so immediately after the festival's official launch on 8 March with four day camping ticket costing €244.50.

Promoters MCD spent a lot of money on advertising the 2011 festival, with ticket sales being slow.

== Official announcements ==
On 13 December 2010, Foo Fighters was announced as one of the headline acts of the 2011 festival, the first act to be announced. The band's album was scheduled to be released prior to the performance. On 14 December, Arctic Monkeys became the second headline act to be announced. It was scheduled to be their first performance at Oxegen since 2006. On 15 December, Blink-182 was announced to play the festival for the first time. It had seldom performed in Ireland in the previous 15 years. On 16 December, Paolo Nutini was announced, having performed at the festival in 2010. On 22 December, The Black Eyed Peas was announced, having also performed at the festival in 2010.

On 8 March 2011, the festival was officially launched, with Coldplay announced as the bill-toppers in what would be their first appearance at Oxegen. Dave Grohl hosted the presentation of the announcement on the festival's official website. Other artists to be added included Bruno Mars, All Time Low, Brandon Flowers, Beady Eye, Swedish House Mafia, My Chemical Romance, Weezer, Plan B, Tinie Tempah, Primal Scream, Two Door Cinema Club, Eels, Calvin Harris, Jimmy Eat World, Hurts, Ryan Sheridan, Bipolar Empire. Bright Eyes, The Bloody Beetroots, Paolo Nutini, The National, Deadmau5, Pendulum, Leftfield, Imelda May, Eels, The Vaccines, Noah and the Whale, Tiga, Sven Väth, Friendly Fires, Crystal Castles, Afrojack, Chase & Status, Ocean Colour Scene, Fight Like Apes, The Naked and Famous, Mona, Fun Lovin' Criminals, Royseven, Fenech-Soler, Madisun, Consumer Love Affair.

Slash, OFWGKTA, Metronomy, Manic Street Preachers, Glasvegas, The Saturdays, Peter Doherty, The Pretty Reckless, Professor Green, Ke$ha, Eliza Doolittle, Example and Cherri Bomb were officially added to the line-up on 18 April.

Blink-182, earlier announced as a headline act announced on 18 April that they were moving their European tour to 2012. So therefore have pulled out of this year's Oxegen festival.

Beyoncé was officially added to the line-up on 5 May. She, along with Coldplay, performed at the 2011 Glastonbury Festival ahead of Oxegen, leading to reports that tickets would start selling quickly again.

On 31 May, the Red Bull Electric Ballroom was launched.

On 27 June, the stage breakdown was announced. On 30 June, the stage times were announced.

Jessie J was forced to cancel her appearance at Oxegen 2011 due to a broken leg.

== Signing tent ==
The Hot Press Signing Tent returned. It featured Two Door Cinema Club, Peter Hook, Royseven, Ryan Sheridan, Friendly Fires and Bressie. Goody bags also featured.

== Broadcasting rights ==
RTÉ 2fm broadcast more than 30 hours of live coverage throughout Oxegen 2011. RTÉ set up a live Oxegen website to share its content between RTÉ Ten, RTÉ.ie, RTÉ 2fm's YouTube channel and RTÉ News Now.

== Incidents ==
On the first day of the festival a teenager from Wexford was slashed with a knife after being set upon by a group in the festival campsite. Overall the Gardaí made a total of 90 arrests at the festival over the weekend, including assault, theft and drink-driving. There were also 308 drug seizures, and 28 arrests for alleged drug dealing.

== Stages ==
Oxegen 2011 had at least five stages, minus one from the previous year. The Redbull Electric Ballroom appeared for the first time.

- The Main Stage was headlined by The Black Eyed Peas, Foo Fighters with Beyoncé and Coldplay.
- The Vodafone Stage was headlined by Swedish House Mafia, Deadmau5 and Pendulum.
- Heineken Green Spheres was headlined by Leftfield, Propaganda DJs and Primal Scream.
- The 2FM/Hot Press Academy was headlined by Glasvegas, Eels and Bright Eyes.
- The Redbull Electric Ballroom was headlined by Sven Väth, The Bloody Beetroots and Afrojack.

== Day/Stage Breakdown + Times ==
Official poster

Main Stage
Friday	Saturday	Sunday
The Black Eyed Peas; 23:15; The Script; 21:10; My Chemical Romance; 19:25; Weezer; 17:55; All Time Low; 16:30; The Blackout; 15:15; Fun Lovin' Criminals; 14:00	Foo Fighters; 23:25; Arctic Monkeys; 21:40; Beady Eye; 20:05; Plan B 18:25; Two Door Cinema Club; 17:00; ~~Jessie J~~ (cancelled); 15:30; Big Country; 14:00	Coldplay; 22:25; Beyoncé; 20:25; Slash; 18:55; Manic Street Preachers; 17:35; Ke$ha; 16:15; Ryan Sheridan; 15:05; The Rubberbandits; 14:00

Vodafone Stage
Friday	Saturday	Sunday
Swedish House Mafia; 23:30; The Strokes; 21:30; Tinie Tempah; 19:45; The Saw Doctors; 18:10; House of Pain; 16:50; Original Rudeboys; 15:40; The Plea; 14:45; Glen Call; 14:00	Deadmau5; 23:05; Paolo Nutini; 21:20; Imelda May; 19:50; Bruno Mars; 18:30; Hurts; 17:15; British Sea Power; 16:00; The Minutes; 14:55; Alice Gold; 14:00	Pendulum; 22:15; The National; 20:40; Jimmy Eat World; 19:10; Friendly Fires; 17:50; Fight Like Apes; 16:30; Royseven; 15:15; The Kanyu Tree; 14:00

Heineken Green Spheres
Friday	Saturday	Sunday
Leftfield; 23:30; Calvin Harris; 21:30; Example; 20:00; Whipping Boy; 18:30; Peter Hook & The Light; 17:00; Her Majesty & The Wolves; 15:50; The Riptide Movement; 14:55; Gypsies on the Autobahn; 14:00	Propaganda DJ's; 23:45; Brandon Flowers; 22:00; The Vaccines; 20:40; Professor Green; 19:20; The Pretty Reckless; 18:05; Bressie; 16:50; Cashier No.9; 15:55; Fox Avenue; 14:55; Little Green Cars; 14:00	Primal Scream; 22:20; Chase and Status; 20:50; Crystal Castles; 19:25; OFWGKTA; 18:10; Ocean Colour Scene; 16:55; The Saturdays; 15:50; Grouplove; 14:55; Neon Trees; 14:00

2FM Hotpress Academy
Friday	Saturday	Sunday
Glasvegas; 23:55; Noah and the Whale; 22:25; The Naked and Famous; 21:10; Metronomy; 20:00; Clare Maguire; 18:55; Tame Impala; 17:50; Keywest; 16:45; Cherri Bomb; 15:50; Readers Wives; 14:55; Madisun; 14:00	Eels; 23:50; City and Colour; 22:40; Mona; 21:30; Miles Kane; 20:25; Eliza Doolittle; 19:20; Kitty Daisy & Lewis; 18:20; Frankie & The Heartstrings; 17:20; Braids; 16:25; Sweet Jane; 15:30; Consumer Love Affair; 14:40; Touchwood; 14:00	Bright Eyes; 22:50; The Airborne Toxic Event; 21:45; Jenny & Johnny; 20:30; Patrick Wolf; 19:25; The Twilight Singers; 18:30; The Pierces; 17:35; Bipolar Empire; 16:40; Viva Brother; 15:45; The Kapitals; 14:50; Fox E And The Goodhands; 14:00

Redbull Electric Ballroom
Friday	Saturday	Sunday
Sven Väth; Tiga; The Shit Robot Show; Justin Robertson; Maverick Sabre; Bitches With Wolves; Fenech-Soler; Colin Perkins	The Bloody Beetroots; Philth; Diplo; Steve Aoki; Retro/Grade; Psycatron; Anthony Remedy; Freaks From Dublin	Afrojack; Crookers; Fake Blood; Alex Metric; Al Gibbs; TEED

== Aftermath ==
- OFWGKTA announced a performance at The Academy in Dublin on 23 August.
- Calvin Harris announced a show at Mandela Hall, Belfast in September.
- Noah and the Whale announced two performances in October. One in Mandela Hall, Belfast and one at Dublin's Olympia Theatre.
- Dublin band The Minutes will perform at The Academy, Dublin on 15 October.
- City and Colour announced they will play The Academy, Dublin on 20 October.
- Patrick Wolf announced a performance at The Speakeasy, Belfast on 23 October and The Academy Dublin on 24 October.
- The Naked and Famous announced a performance at Dublin's Olympia Theatre on 13 November.
- Example announced he would play The Olympia Theatre in Dublin on 30 November.
- Friendly Fires performed at Dublin's Olympia Theatre on 7 December.
- The Saturdays announced two shows in December at The Odyssey Arena, Belfast and The O_{2} in Dublin.

Preceded by Oxegen '10	Oxegen; 2011	Succeeded by Oxegen '13
