= Miss Fantasia Preaches =

Single by The Blizzards

from the album A Public Display of Affection
- Released: August 18, 2006
- Recorded: 2006
- Genre: Rock
- Length: 3:40
- Label: Universal Music Ireland
- Songwriter: Niall Breslin
- Producer: Michael Beinhorn

The Blizzards singles chronology
"Trouble" (2006)	"Miss Fantasia Preaches" (2006)	"War of Words" (2006)

"Miss Fantasia Preaches" was the third single released by the Irish ska pop quartet, The Blizzards. It was taken from their debut album, A Public Display of Affection. The song received extensive airplay on national radio throughout the summer and became an instant chart hit when released. It was released on 18 August 2006 when it charted in Ireland at #9, spending two weeks in the Irish Singles Chart. The song is based on the local sex shop in Mullingar Butterfly Kisses

== Chart performance ==
"Miss Fantasia Preaches" spent two weeks in the Irish Singles Chart in 2006. It entered the chart at #9 staying there for one week.

Chart (2006)	Peak position
Irish Singles Chart	9
