= Show Me Love (Bressie song) =

2013 single by Bressie

"Show Me Love" is a single by Irish artist Bressie released in April 2013. It is the first single taken from the album "Rage and Romance" which was released in April 2013. The song reached number fifty three on the Irish Singles Chart. On 31 March 2013, he performed the song live on The Voice of Ireland. Its music video features Moone Boy actors David Rawle and Ian O'Reilly.

== Chart positions ==
Chart (2013)	Peak position
Ireland (IRMA)	53
