= Trust Me, I'm a Doctor =

Trust Me, I'm a Doctor can refer to:

- Trust Me, I'm A Doctor (song), the lead single of Domino Effect by The Blizzards
- Trust Me, I'm a Doctor (TV series), BBC, about health matters in Britain
- Trust Me, I'm a doctor, an advertising slogan for Dr Pepper
- Trust Me, I'm a Doctor: My Life Before, During and After Anna Nicole Smith, a 2017 memoir by Sandeep Kapoor, physician to Anna Nicole Smith
  - Trust Me, I'm a Doctor (film), a 2026 dramatization of Kapoor's memoir
