= 2009 Meteor Awards =

Irish music awards ceremony

- Meteor Awards 2009 logo
- Date: 17 March 2009
- Location: RDS Simmonscourt
- Presented by: Amanda Byram
- Website: meteormusicawards.meteor.ie/index.aspx

Television/radio coverage
- Network: RTÉ Two

The 2009 Meteor Music Awards ceremony took place on 17 March 2009 in the RDS Simmonscourt, Dublin. It was the ninth edition of Ireland's national music awards. The event was recorded and it aired on RTÉ Two on 18 March 2009. The awards show was hosted by television presenter Amanda Byram.

The general public were eligible to vote in eight categories - Best Irish Band, Best Irish Male, Best Irish Female, Best Irish Pop Act, Best Irish Album, Best Irish Live Performance, Best National DJ and Best Regional DJ. AC/DC, Coldplay, Elbow, The Killers and Kings of Leon were nominated for Best International Band, whilst Boyzone, The Blizzards, The Coronas, The Script and Westlife were the nominees for Best Irish Pop Act. Mick Flannery, Damien Dempsey, Duke Special, David Holmes and Richard Egan of Jape were nominated in the Best Irish Male category, whilst Enya, Lisa Hannigan, Gemma Hayes, Imelda May, Tara Blaise and Camille O'Sullivan were nominated in the Best Irish Female category. The Hope for 2009 nominees were announced on 18 February, with public voting commencing on 23 February. Hot Press editor Niall Stokes received an industry award, whilst Father Shay Cullen's PREDA Foundation received €100,000. The Lifetime Achievement Award was given to traditional folk musician Sharon Shannon.

== Performances ==
Boyzone, The Blizzards, Sharon Shannon, Stereophonics and Imelda May performed on the night.

Artist	Performance
Stereophonics	Medley
James Morrison	"Broken Strings"
Duke Special	"Sweet Sweet Kisses"
Gabriella Cilmi	"Sweet About Me"
Enrique Iglesias and Gabriella Cilmi	"Takin' Back My Love"
The Blizzards	"Trust Me, I'm a Doctor"
Imelda May	"Johnny Got a Boom Boom"
Elbow	"Grounds For Divorce"
Boyzone	"Love You Anyway"
Mundy and Sharon Shannon	"Galway Girl"

== Nominations ==
The nominees were officially announced on 28 January 2009, having initially been published on the official site the night before only to be quickly removed. And the winners are...

=== Public Voting Categories ===
==== Best National DJ ====
- Alison Curtis – Today FM
- Dave Fanning – RTÉ 2fm
- Tony Fenton – Today FM
- Ray Foley – Today FM
- Dan Hegarty – RTÉ 2fm
- Rick O'Shea – RTÉ 2fm

Presented by Lorraine Keane

==== Best Regional DJ ====
- Keith Cunningham (KC) - RedFM
- Dermot, Dave & Siobhan – Dublin's 98
- Leigh Doyle – Beat 102-103
- Mark Noble – FM 104
- Jon Richards – Galway Bay FM
- The Zoo Crew – Spin South West

Presented by Lucy Kennedy and Nancy Cartwright

==== Best Irish Band ====
- The Blizzards
- Fight Like Apes
- Republic of Loose
- The Script
- Snow Patrol

Presented by Sonya Lennon and Brendan Courtney

==== Best Irish Male ====
- Damien Dempsey
- Duke Special
- Mick Flannery
- David Holmes
- Jape

==== Best Irish Female ====
- Tara Blaise
- Lisa Hannigan
- Gemma Hayes
- Imelda May
- Camille O'Sullivan

==== Best Irish Pop Act ====
- Boyzone
- The Blizzards
- The Coronas
- The Script
- Westlife

Presented by Pádraig Harrington

==== Best Irish Album ====
- Fight Like Apes – Fight Like Apes and the Mystery of the Golden Medallion
- Lisa Hannigan – Sea Sew
- Messiah J & The Expert – From the Word Go
- The Script – The Script
- Snow Patrol – A Hundred Million Suns

Presented by Tony Lundon, Liam McCormack and Sinéad McKenna

==== Best Irish Live Performance ====
- The Blizzards - Oxegen 2008
- The Coronas - The Button Factory
- Fight Like Apes - Whelan's
- Republic of Loose - The Academy
- The Swell Season - Olympia Theatre

Presented by Craig Doyle and Devon Murray

=== Non-Public Voting Categories ===
==== Best Traditional/Folk ====
- Damien Dempsey
- Martin Hayes & Dennis Cahill
- Colm Mac Con Iomaire
- Eleanor McEvoy
- John Spillane

Presented by Bláthnaid Ní Chofaigh and Anna Nolan

==== Best International Live Performance ====
- The Script
- Coldplay
- Kings of Leon
- Bruce Springsteen
- The Killers

==== Best International Band ====
- AC/DC
- Coldplay
- Elbow
- The Killers
- Kings of Leon

Presented by Caprice and Laura Whitmore Elbow won the award in 2009.

==== Best International Female ====
- Beyoncé
- Duffy
- Lykke Li
- Pink
- Rihanna

==== Best International Male ====
- Chris Brown
- Nick Cave
- Bon Iver
- James Morrison
- Kanye West

Presented by Louis Walsh

==== Best International Album ====
- Day & Age - The Killers
- Fleet Foxes - Fleet Foxes
- Only by the Night - Kings of Leon
- The Circus - Take That
- Viva la Vida or Death and All His Friends - Coldplay

=== Lifetime Achievement Award ===
- Sharon Shannon

Presented by Gráinne and Síle Seoige

=== Humanitarian Award ===
- Father Shay Cullen's PREDA Foundation

Presented by Pat Kenny and Conor Carmody from Meteor

=== Industry Award ===
- Niall Stokes

Presented by Dave Fanning and Joe Elliott

=== Hope for 2009 ===
- Autumn Owls
- Fred
- House of Cosy Cushions
- James Vincent McMorrow
- Wallis Bird

Presented by Rick O'Shea

=== Most Downloaded Song ===
"Galway Girl" – Mundy and Sharon Shannon

== Multiple nominations ==
Lisa Hannigan was the only solo artist to be nominated in more than one category. She was nominated in two categories, Best Irish Female and Best Irish Album. She won neither.

- 3 - The Blizzards
- 3 - Coldplay
- 3 - Fight Like Apes
- 3 - The Killers
- 3 - Kings of Leon
- 3 - The Script
- 2 - The Coronas
- 2 - Lisa Hannigan
- 2 - Republic of Loose
- 2 - Snow Patrol
