= Niall Stokes =

Irish music journalist, best known as the editor of Hot Press

- Born: 1951 (age 74–75); Dublin, Ireland
- Education: Bachelor of Arts
- Alma mater: University College Dublin (UCD) Synge Street CBS
- Occupations: Music journalist, editor
- Notable credit(s): Editor of Hot Press, Editor of the Year (2008 PPAI Magazine of the Year Awards), Industry Award (2009 Meteor Awards)
- Spouse: Mairin Sheehy

Niall Stokes (born 1951) is a music journalist who has served as editor of the long-running fortnightly Ireland music and political magazine Hot Press based in Dublin. He has edited the magazine since 1977. He has been a longstanding champion of Irish music, most famously U2 in the late 1970s and throughout the 1980s. He was involved with The Music Show, an exhibition of the Irish music industry held in the RDS in October 2008. He was Chairman of the Independent Radio and Television Commission (now the BCI) between 1993 and 1998. He has written several books, including Into the Heart: The Stories Behind Every U2 Song.

He graduated from University College Dublin with a Bachelor of Arts degree. Whilst in college, Stokes was a member of a band called Eyeless, alongside Neil Jordan. He was also a freelance writer for outlets such as The Irish Times before founding Hot Press. He lives with his wife, Mairin Sheehy, in Dublin.

On 20 June 2002, he appeared on an episode of Rattlebag which celebrated the 25th anniversary of Hot Press. In January 2008, he attended the recording sessions of "The Ballad of Ronnie Drew" in Windmill Lane Studios. He has appeared on the interactive music series The Raw Sessions.

Stokes has also appeared as a panellist on Questions and Answers. On radio he has featured on Five Seven Live, This Week, Morning Ireland and Drivetime.

In 2007, he pursued a High Court action against high-profile MCD promoter Denis Desmond and Riverdance's Moya Doherty and John McColgan in the aftermath of the Hot Press Music Hall of Fame Museum's failure. The "substantial" court action was settled.

== Awards ==
Stokes won Editor of the Year at the 2008 PPAI Magazine of the Year Awards.

Stokes received an industry award at the 2009 Meteor Awards. Tributes were paid by Niall Breslin, Tom Dunne, Snow Patrol, Bono and The Edge.

Year	Nominee / work	Award	Result
2008	Niall Stokes	PPAI Magazine of the Year Awards – Editor of the Year	Won
2009	Niall Stokes	Metor Music Awards – Industry Award	Won

=== Other accolades ===
Niall Stokes was presented with a lifetime achievement by Magazines Ireland in 2011. 8 March 2011: "Niall Stokes founded Hot Press in 1977 and has steered the magazine through over 30 years to be one of Ireland's most successful magazines. Niall launched the career of some of the most prominent journalists in Ireland" – John Mullins, Zahara Publishing & Chairperson of Magazines Ireland.

The Irish Examiner included Stokes in its top fifty list of "most important and influential people in Irish music during 2005".
