= Domino Effect (The Blizzards album) =

Studio album by The Blizzards
- Released: 12 September 2008
- Recorded: Sun Studios, Dublin & Grouse Lodge, County Westmeath
- Genre: Ska-Pop, Post-Punk Revival
- Length: 37:33
- Label: Universal Ireland
- Producer: Michael Beinhorn

The Blizzards chronology
A Public Display of Affection (2006)	Domino Effect (2008)

Singles from Domino Effect
- 1. "Trust Me, I'm A Doctor" Released: 22 August 2008; 2. "The Reason" Released: 28 November 2008; 3. "Postcards" Released: 27 February 2009

Professional ratings
Review scores
Source	Rating
Allmusic	3.5/5 stars
entertainment.ie	3.5/5 stars
RTÉ.ie	3/5 stars
Sputnikmusic	3.5/5 stars

Domino Effect is the second studio album from The Blizzards, released on 12 September 2008. The first single from the album "Trust Me, I'm A Doctor" was released in August 2008, A second single, "The Reason" was released in November 2008. The third single, "Postcards", was released on 27 February 2009.

== Album information ==
The second track to be released from the album was "The Reason", receiving nationwide success like its predecessor, "Trust Me, I'm a Doctor". The third single, "Postcards" was released on 27 February 2009 and is a slower, different style to the Blizzards' usual music.

A digital booklet containing the lyrics of songs on the album as well as personal messages from the band members came with "Domino Effect (E-Deluxe Version)" on iTunes.

Another track on the album, "Money Doesn't Buy You Class", is about southside Dublin girls of the type "You'd see at UCD", when The Blizzards vocalist Niall Breslin studied there. He thought they were "So full of themselves, so superficial, so obsessed with money. Many had absolutely nothing of interest to say for themselves".

== Track listing ==
1. "Buy It Sell It" – 3:47
2. "Trust Me, I'm A Doctor" - 3:07
3. "Money Doesn't Buy You Class" - 3:28
4. "Three Cheers for Modern Medicine" - 3:43
5. "The Reason" - 3:34
6. "Postcards" - 3:59
7. "The Domino Effect" - 4:34
8. "Silence is Violence" - 3:10
9. "Bad Thoughts" - 2:30
10. "Time to Decide" - 5:41
11. "The Obsession of Carla Bruni" (Bonus Track) - 3:11
12. "Metrosexual" (iTunes Bonus Track) - 3:02

== Chart performance ==
The album reached number two in the Irish Albums Chart, losing out to Metallica's Death Magnetic.

Chart (2008)	Peak Position
Irish Album Chart	2
