= Breaking My Fall =

2012 single by Bressie

"Breaking My Fall" is a single by Irish artist Bressie released in 2012. It is the third single taken from the album "Colourblind Stereo". The song reached number fourteen on the Irish Singles Chart. On 11 March 2012, he performed the song live on The Voice of Ireland.

== Chart positions ==
| Chart (2012) | Peak position |
|---|---|
| Ireland (IRMA) | 14 |
