= I'm Revived =

Single by Royseven

from the album The Art of Insincerity
- B-side: "Robots"
- Released: February 16, 2007 (Republic of Ireland)
- Recorded: 2006
- Genre: Rock
- Length: 3:40
- Label: Universal
- Songwriters: Paul Walsh, Sam Garland, Eamonn Barrett, Bernard O'Neill, Darragh Oglesby, Paul O'Hara
- Producer: Marc Carolan

Royseven singles chronology
"Happy Ever Afters" (2006)	"I'm Revived" (2007)	"Crash" (2007)

"I'm Revived" is a song by the Irish alternative rock sestet, Royseven, found on their debut album, The Art of Insincerity. The song was released as their third Irish single (following the limited edition double A-side, "Happy Ever Afters/Roy") in February 2007, entering the Irish Singles Chart on February 15 where it reached #26 and spent one week.
