= David Rawle =

Irish actor

- Born: 16 October 2000 (age 25); Carrigallen, County Leitrim, Ireland
- Occupation: Actor
- Years active: 2012–present
- Notable work: Moone Boy (2012–2015)

David Rawle (born 16 October 2000) is an Irish actor from Carrigallen, County Leitrim. He is best known for starring in the Irish sitcom Moone Boy, co-written by and co-starring Chris O'Dowd. His first audition for acting was for Santa Claus. In 2012, he was nominated at the British Comedy Awards for Best Comedy Breakthrough Artist.

== Career ==
Between 2012 and 2015, David played Martin Moone in Moone Boy, an Irish sitcom on Sky One. In the series, which is set in the early 1990s, he had an imaginary friend called Seán; he is the youngest child of a family living in rural Boyle, County Roscommon. Martin, aided by his imaginary friend, has a unique perspective on life. His imagination comes into play both in his childish drawings, which come alive through animation, and in the ridiculous schemes he comes up with, against Seán's better judgement. With Seán's help, Martin negotiates life as the youngest in a chaotic, scatter-brained Irish family.

He also provides the voice of Ben in the 2014 film, Song of the Sea. Since September 2011, he has been a member of the Leitrim Youth Theatre in Carrigallen. In January 2013, he (along with Moone Boy co-star Ian O'Reilly) appeared in Bressie's music video for his single Show Me Love.

== Personal life ==
He has two older sisters and has been attending drama classes since he was 4 years old. His hobbies also include reading, swimming, karate, and playing the piano and drums.

== Filmography ==
=== Television ===
Year	Title	Role	Notes	Ref.
2012-2015	Moone Boy	Martin Moone	Nominated – British Comedy Award for Best Comedy Breakthrough Artist	
2017-2019	Drop Dead Weird	Dermot		

=== Film ===
Year	Title	Role	Notes	Ref.
2014	Song of the Sea	Ben	Voice	
2020	Pixie	Altar Boy		
2025	Blue Moon	George Roy Hill		
