= Can't Stay Young Forever =

2011 single by Bressie

"Can't Stay Young Forever" is a single by Irish recording artist Bressie released in 2011. It is the first single taken from the album "Colourblind Stereo". The song reached number nine on the Irish Singles Chart and received significant airplay on Irish radio.

== Chart positions ==
Chart (2011)	Peak position
Ireland (IRMA)	9
