= A Public Display of Affection =

Studio album by The Blizzards
- Released: October 2006
- Recorded: Sun Studios, Dublin & Grouse Lodge, County Westmeath
- Genre: Ska-Pop, Garage Rock
- Label: Universal Music Ireland
- Producer: Michael Beinhorn

The Blizzards chronology
| A Public Display of Affection (2006) | Domino Effect (2008) |

Singles from A Public Display of Affection
- 1. "First Girl to Leave Town"; 2. "Trouble"; 3. "Miss Fantasia Preaches"; 4. "War of Words"; 5. "Fantasy"; 6. "On the Right Track"

A Public Display of Affection is the debut album from Irish band The Blizzards. All lyrics were written by Niall Breslin and all the music was by The Blizzards.

== Track listing ==
1. "Freaky"
2. "Miss Fantasia Preaches"
3. "Trouble"
4. "Fantasy"
5. "War of Words"
6. "On the Right Track"
7. "Why Do You Fancy Scumbags?"
8. "Dangerous Bitches"
9. "Superdrug"
10. "Black Hole"
11. "The Carney Code"
12. "Call Me a Priest"

Bonus track: "First Girl to Leave Town"
