= Oxegen 2010 =

Music festival in Ireland

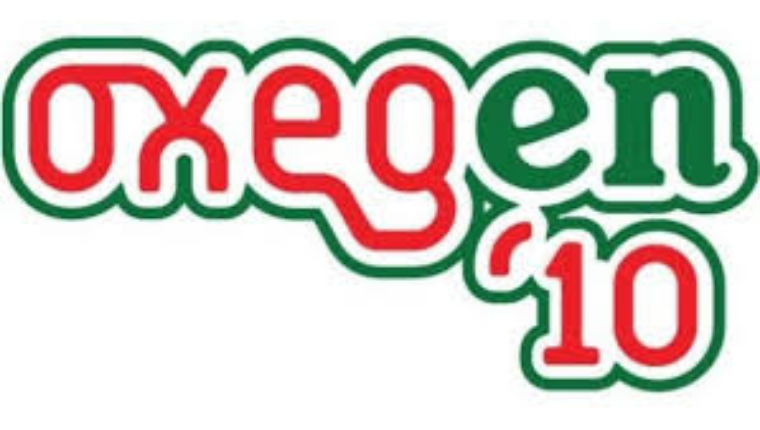
- Oxegen 2010 logo
- Dates: 9–11 July 2010
- Locations: Punchestown Racecourse, County Kildare, Ireland
- Previous event: Oxegen 2009
- Next event: Oxegen 2011
- Website: www.OXEGEN.ie

Oxegen 2010 was the seventh Oxegen festival to take place since 2004. It took place on the weekend of Friday 9 July, Saturday, 10 July and Sunday, 11 July at Punchestown Racecourse near Naas in County Kildare, Ireland. Eminem, Muse and Arcade Fire headlined. A total of around 150 acts performed over the three days.

Oxegen 2010 was Arcade Fire's first Irish appearance since performing in the Phoenix Park and was their first 2010 European show to be confirmed. Drummer Jeremy Gara also admitted it was their first major show since the band's Neon Bible tour and was awestruck at the idea of performing on the Main Stage directly after Jay-Z. Bell X1 gave their only Irish performance of the summer at the event on 11 July. Muse debuted a new song when they headlined the Main Stage on 10 July.

The Capitals became the youngest band to play Oxegen in its history. Pop act Jedward, known in the UK for their appearances on The X Factor, asked to be allowed to perform. It was later suggested in an interview that they were due to perform until one of them tore their ligaments open.

Jim Carroll of The Irish Times named several Oxegen 2010-bound acts in his "20 hottest acts playing this summer" on 28 May 2010: these were Jay-Z, Arcade Fire, The Middle East, Villagers and O Emperor. In a later article in the newspaper he named his "10 must-see acts on his Oxegen timetable with a big, fat yellow highlighter": Jay-Z, Arcade Fire, The Prodigy, Florence & The Machine, Vampire Weekend, Cathy Davey, Julian Casablancas, Laura Marling, Hot Chip and Tinariwen. Tony Clayton-Lea, writing in the same publication, suggested 10 upcoming acts for readers to see: Kassidy, Lissie, Two Door Cinema Club, Kids in Glass Houses, Ellie Goulding, Daisy Dares You, Professor Green, General Fiasco, Example and Cécile.

== Build-up ==
=== Dates ===
The dates for Oxegen 2010 were announced on 23 July 2009, following Oxegen 2009.

=== Tickets ===
Early bird tickets went on sale on 5 December 2009 in 2007 prices in an attempt to generate interest.

Tickets were still available as the festival began, with 5,000 tickets available on the Wednesday before the event. This led to an increased promotional push by the organisers in a bid to sell as many tickets as possible.

=== Official announcements ===
On 23 February 2010, the first acts of the Oxegen 2010 line-up were announced, including Eminem, Muse, Jay-Z, The Black Eyed Peas, Kasabian, The Prodigy, Florence and the Machine, Paolo Nutini, Faithless, Stereophonics, David Guetta, Vampire Weekend, Mumford and Sons, John Mayer, Hot Chip, Calvin Harris, Newton Faulkner, Gossip, The Temper Trap, Empire of the Sun, Goldfrapp, La Roux, Wolfmother, Rise Against, The Coral, Broken Social Scene, Ellie Goulding, Two Door Cinema Club, Armand Van Helden, Steve Angello, Simian Mobile Disco, Erol Alkan, Steve Aoki, A-Trak and Aeroplane. The launch took place at The Academy. 33 acts in total were announced at this time, including the first Irish act (Two Door Cinema Club).

On 8 March 2010, two more artists were announced; headliner Arcade Fire as well as Fatboy Slim.

On 30 March 2010, further artists were announced: Dizzee Rascal, Laura Marling, Diana Vickers, Earth Wind & Fire, The Black Keys, Julian Casablancas, The Cribs, Chase & Status, The Stranglers and Fox Avenue.

On 9 April 2010, it was reported that Kassidy would perform at the festival on 9 July.

On 21 April 2010, the Red Bull Music Academy's return was confirmed, with The Drums, Broken Social Scene, Delphic, Dirty Projectors, Gabriella Cilmi, Chipmunk, Tinie Tempah and Wild Beasts among the acts scheduled to perform there.

On 28 April 2010, Bell X1 announced an appearance on their website, stating the band's only Irish appearance of the summer would be at Punchestown on 11 July. Kate Nash was also announced that day. Later that night Bell X1 and Kate Nash were officially announced alongside eleven more acts: Doves, Editors, Scouting for Girls, Ocean Colour Scene, Echo & the Bunnymen, The Courteeners, Joshua Radin, Airbourne, The Coronas, Republic of Loose and The Middle East.

On 19 May 2010, the return of the Hot Press signing tent and the line-up for the Hot Press Academy Stage were announced; new acts included Ash, We Are Scientists, Kele Okereke, Cathy Davey, Villagers, Wallis Bird, Mystery Jets, Shed Seven, Diana Vickers and 3OH!3.

On 24 May 2010, Local Natives, Plan B and Biffy Clyro were officially announced.

On 1 June 2010, it was announced that Wolfmother were forced to cancel all their summer European dates, including their announced oxegen performance. Airbourne also cancelled.

On 3 June 2010, the final stage line-up for the Red Bull Music Academy was confirmed, with the addition of Darwin Deez and The Minutes.

On 10 June, the final stage line-up (apart from one act) for Heineken Green Spheres was confirmed.

In second week of June several more acts were added on oxegen.ie: Vitalic, Fake Blood, Louis La Roche, Fred Falke, Jesse Rose, The Golden Filter, Popof, Primary 1, DJ Villa, French Horn Rebellion, Bitches with Wolves, Ou Est, Amasis, Dublin Streets, Al Gibbs, Vogue and DJ Gordo.

On 14 June, the complete day and stage breakdown was revealed by MCD.

On 18 June 2010, Choice Prize-shortlisted indie-electro band Codes confirmed on The Rick O'Shea Show that they would be appearing on Friday 9th. The stage they would be appearing on was not announced.

On 2 July 2010, the stage times were announced.

On 8 July 2010, the Oxegen website announced that John Mayer would no longer be performing.

=== Related events ===
Platform V. Oxegen Battle of the Bands took place for the fourth year, with the closing date for entries being 30 April 2010. The competition featured bands from the Kildare area, with the winners being permitted to perform on at Oxegen 2010. Awake Young Soldiers and Funzo were announced as the winning acts on 23 June 2010.

The Irish Times's Tony Clayton-Lea compared prices of T-shirt merchandising by some of the acts ahead of the festival.

A new application for the iPhone was produced especially for Oxegen 2010.

=== Traffic ===
The festival began accepting entries on 8 July 2010, with 17,000 of those intending to camp having arrived by 13:00 that afternoon. Those who had arrived on 8 July could view acts pretending to be Michael Jackson, Oasis and The Police at The Tribute Stage, there was also the Nokia Live Stage in the Blue Campsite, while the silent disco opened the following night.

The blue car park was full by Friday, but the red car park remained open. One festivalgoer transported her belongings via a wheelie bin. Public transport facilities were available throughout Ireland, including Dublin Bus and Bus Éireann from Parnell Square West and Customs House Quay in Dublin, and services from Parnell Place in Cork and the Parkway roundabout in Limerick.

Around two dozen volunteers cycled 30 kilometres from Terenure College to Punchestown in aid of the Christina Noble Foundation, including Ireland national rugby union team members Jamie Heaslip and Cian Healy. Fancy Dress Friday also occurred for the first time, with festival goers being encouraged to don costumes of their own choosing.

== Festival ==
=== Weather ===
There were mud baths on the Friday and Saturday, while there was some sunny weather on the Sunday. There were "persistent downpours". This led to a booming trade for welly salespersons.

Several performers were heard to comment on the bad weather. Stereophonics frontman Kelly Jones moaned: "Even when it was Witnness, it fucking rained". Ezra Koenig of Vampire Weekend said: "I put Oxegen in with that class of rainy festivals in Scandinavia and Glastonbury, but this is our first proper rainy, cold European festival this year". Muse drummer Dominic Howard said: "I feel sorry for the people who are getting rained on all day. Normally, spirits are pretty good even though it is raining - you have to make it a good time, and the will and spirit of the people make it a positive experience. It is a shame because it has been so beautiful recently. Unfortunately, the weather makes a difference because at Glastonbury you get jaded when it is raining, but this year everybody was in a good mood". Two Door Cinema Club told onlookers during their performance to ignore the mud and "enjoy the party". Jay-Z also referred to the weather during his performance: "I really appreciate everybody coming out in the rain. It’s just here to cool us down". Arcade Fire and Jay-Z both ordered many Dunlop wellies. Arcade Fire's Win Butler poured a large bottle of water onto his own head and yelled at the crowd: "Look, now we’re all the same".

=== Performances ===
Eliza Doolittle was the first act to perform on the Main Stage at 14:00 on 9 July. She performed songs such as "Mr Medicine", "Skinny Genes" and "Pack Up". Cian Healy aka DJ Church was the first to perform in the Dance Arena. Jay-Z arrived on stage after a 30-minute delay and drew a positive response when he referred to 2009 comments by Noel Gallagher: "That bloke from Oasis said I couldn’t play guitar, someone should have told them I'm a fucking rock star". Jim Carroll of The Irish Times dismissed Arcade Fire's Main Stage headlining performance as a "Friday night flop". Rosemary Mac Cabe, in the same publication, praised the performance of Empire of the Sun, saying "Facepaint, masks and pantomime-style dancers were mere embellishments to standout beats and choruses – and lead vocalist Luke Steele gave us something to talk about by breaking his guitar and throwing the pieces into the outstretched hands of an awestruck crowd".

The Stranglers were the first band to perform on the Main Stage on 10 July. Jennifer Aniston's former boyfriend John Mayer was forced to cancel due to an undisclosed illness, resulting in the promotion of Two Door Cinema Club to the Main Stage. Florence & the Machine performed in the rain. Her Main Stage performance drew thousands of people despite it clashing with a particularly bad downpour of rain. Dizzee Rascal performed a version of Nirvana's "Smells Like Teen Spirit". A large crowd attended The Black Eyed Peas performance. Muse began their Main Stage headlining performance with one of their most well-known songs "Plug In Baby" in the hope that it would delight the drenched crowd.

Echo & the Bunnymen were the first band to perform on the Main Stage on 11 July. Earth, Wind & Fire performed afterwards. The 2010 FIFA World Cup Final was broadcast on a 100 metres squared screen by the Nokia Live Stage on the Sunday night. This clashed with Paolo Nutini's Main Stage performance. Eminem headlined the Main Stage on the Sunday night of the festival, dressed in black and white clothing, and performing new and old songs. The performance, littered with multiple "motherfuckers", had been dogged by persistent rumours beforehand that said it would be cancelled and the organisers had to reject all of these. Eminem asked the organisers for some festival mementos.

=== Signing tent ===
The Hot Press Signing Tent returned. On Friday there were appearances from Eliza Doolittle, Delorentos, Codes, Darwin Deez, Villagers, and Tinie Tempah. On Saturday there were appearances from Wild Beasts, 3OH!3, Bombay Bicycle Club, Ash, and Cathy Davey. On Sunday there were appearances from Thirty Seconds to Mars, and The Courteeners.

=== Backstage ===
Jay-Z sent two security guards to Punchestown in advance to examine the area in which he was to perform. He jetted into Dublin, asking that his dressing room be filled with red wine, a selection of spirits, tequila shots and cigars.

Eminem requested gym equipment for his own personal use.

In the week leading up their performance, many artists commented online: Eliza Doolittle said: "Just rehearsing with the boys! Cannot wait for Oxygen and T in the Park this weekend!" Wallis Bird said: "Can’t wait for Oxegen on Saturday! 3pm at the Heineken Green Spheres tent!". Scouting for Girls bassist Greg Churchouse said: "If it is anything like the last time, it should be an awesome gig. We didn’t know what to expect, but it was wicked".

The Prodigy ate Irish stew prior to their performance.

=== VIP guests ===
Beyoncé Knowles accompanied her partner, Jay-Z, who performed at the festival. She landed her private jet at Dublin Airport, before driving to Punchestown in her car. She watched her husband perform from the side of the stage. Members of the Newcastle United football team, who were training nearby, also popped in.

Ian Dempsey attended to watch his son Evan perform with his band The Capitals.

Rugby players Jamie Heaslip, Luke Fitzgerald, Tommy Bowe and Cian Healy were invited onto the stage to create extra noise during the final song by Mumford & Sons, called "The Cave".

Also seen at Oxegen 2010 were actress Rachel McAdams, and Westlife member Mark Feehily.

=== Crime ===
Instant illegal substance detection was deployed again in 2010, having first been used in 2009. For the first time authorities used Facebook to warn festival goers away from illegal substances as the festival approached.

There was a new event control room featuring more than 100 security cameras at the festival.

Vuvuzelas were a common feature of Oxegen 2010. They were on sale at the festival site for €10. Joe Griffin of The Irish Times compared the sound of the instruments to "a plague of hornets" and "a dying goose honking its final honk".

More than 200 gardaí attended Oxegen 2010. They said there was "very little trouble" to be had at the festival, with only minor offences reported. These included some drug seizures. Total arrests: 125, public order offences (38), thefts (35), drug dealing (27), drunken driving (16), assaults (5), driving offences (4), drug seizures (360).

One man was stabbed at the festival, but later reports showed he made a full recovery.

A garda was run over and hurt his head after a car failed to stop at a checkpoint at 01:30 on the Sunday (11 July). The car was later located and the driver was severely dealt with by authorities.

== Aftermath ==
=== Cleanup ===
Campers were given until 18:00 on the Monday after the festival to depart the scene. This marked a change from previous years, when campers had to depart at an earlier time on the Monday, with the festival's organisers commenting: "We would rather people be rested, sober and in a position where they are capable of driving home safely". The Irish Times said the blue campsite "resembled a landfill this morning [Monday] with items such as mud coated air mattresses, collapsed tents, barbecues, wellies and panties abandoned by weekend revellers". Some tents were set on fire while other tents were flattened by flying humans.

400 cleaners gathered 150 tonnes of waste, with around 50 per cent of this scheduled to be recycled. It was expected to take several days. Passports, jewellery and mobile phones were all mislaid by festival goers.

=== Returning bands ===
Several international acts announced future Irish headline shows to follow Oxegen 2010.

- The Black Keys are scheduled to return to play a show at Dublin's Tripod on 27 October.
- Paolo Nutini is scheduled to play two shows in Ireland: the INEC in Killarney on 20 September and The Royal Theatre in Castlebar on 21 September.
- Ellie Goulding announced she would play three shows in Ireland: Ulster Hall in Belfast on 28 November, The Roisín Dubh in Galway on 29 November, and Tripod in Dublin on 30 November.
- Goldfrapp will play the Olympia Theatre in Dublin on 26 November.
- Yeasayer will play the Olympia Theatre on 18 October.
- Bell X1 will play a nationwide acoustic tour in November.
- Joshua Radin will perform at The Academy in Dublin on 16 October.
- The Temper Trap will return for two performances in October, one night each in Belfast and Dublin.
- Arcade Fire announced they would return for 2 headline shows at The O_{2} on 5–6 December. Vampire Weekend who also performed at Oxegen 2010 will support on both nights.
- Plan B will return in 2011 to play his first Irish headline show at Dublin's Olympia Theatre.
- Republic of Loose announced a 4 night residency at The Academy in December 2010.
- The Coronas will perform two night at The Olympia Theatre in December 2010.
- Tinie Tempah will also make his return in November 2010 to play The Academy, Dublin.
- The Drums will also headline the academy in 2010.

== Broadcasting rights ==
RTÉ 2fm and RTÉ 2XM broadcast nearly 30 hours of live coverage throughout Oxegen 2010. The RTÉ 2fm coverage began on 9 July at 19:00, presented by a team including Jenny Greene, Jenny Huston, Dan Hegarty, Cormac Battle and Mr. Spring. The RTÉ 2XM coverage began at 14:00 on 10 and 11 July, with RTÉ 2fm joining in later. The 2fm website was also updated regularly throughout the festival, including recordings and interviews. Live music was also broadcast on 70 European music radio stations via Eurosonic (European Broadcasting Union).

Many independent stations also had studios in the backstage area for live broadcasts all weekend including Spin, Beat, iRadio, Phantom FM, Red FM, Cool FM and Today FM.

== Stages ==
Oxegen 2010 had at least six stages. There was at least one new stage, the 2FM/Hot Press Academy. The O2 Stage was renamed the Vodafone Stage.

- The Main Stage was headlined by Arcade Fire, Muse and Eminem.
- The Vodafone Stage was headlined by Fatboy Slim, The Black Eyed Peas and The Prodigy.
- Heineken Green Spheres was headlined by David Guetta, Calvin Harris and Mumford & Sons.
- The 2FM/Hot Press Academy was headlined by Villagers, Ash and Julian Casablancas.
- The Red Bull Music Academy was headlined by Chipmunk, The Drums and Broken Social Scene.
- The Dance Arena was headlined by Simian Mobile Disco (DJ Set), Armand Van Helden and Steve Angello.

== 2010 Line-up ==
Official poster

Headliners: Arcade Fire / Muse / Eminem

Line-up and stage breakdown.

=== Main Stage ===
Friday 9 July	Saturday 10 July	Sunday 11 July
Arcade Fire; Jay-Z; Stereophonics; Vampire Weekend; The Black Keys; The Coronas; Eliza Doolittle	Muse; Kasabian; Dizzee Rascal; Florence and the Machine; Biffy Clyro; Two Door Cinema Club; The Stranglers	Eminem; Faithless; Paolo Nutini; Bell X1; Newton Faulkner; Earth, Wind & Fire; Echo & the Bunnymen

=== The Vodafone Stage ===
Friday 9 July	Saturday 10 July	Sunday 11 July
Fatboy Slim; Groove Armada; Scouting for Girls; Plan B; Republic of Loose; Drake; Fox Avenue	The Black Eyed Peas; Doves; Editors; The Cribs; Rise Against; Tinariwen; Kids in Glass Houses	The Prodigy; Thirty Seconds to Mars; The Temper Trap; Joshua Radin; D12; Professor Green; The Knux

=== Heineken Green Spheres ===
Friday 9 July	Saturday 10 July	Sunday 11 July
David Guetta; Goldfrapp; Empire of the Sun; The Coral; Delorentos; God Is an Astronaut; Kassidy	Calvin Harris; Hot Chip; Gossip; La Roux; Cathy Davey; Ellie Goulding; Wallis Bird; Panama Kings	Mumford & Sons; Ocean Colour Scene; The Courteeners; Jamie T; We Are Scientists; Kate Nash; Diana Vickers; General Fiasco

=== 2FM/Hot Press Academy ===
Friday 9 July	Saturday 10 July	Sunday 11 July
Villagers; Frightened Rabbit; Shed Seven; O Emperor; CODES; Joe Echo; Lissie; Sweet Jane	Ash; Kele; Bombay Bicycle Club; Yeasayer; Hurts; Mayer Hawthorne; 3OH!3; Chapel Club; Daisy Dares You; Matthew P; Hozier as "Andrew Hozier Byrne"	Julian Casablancas; Laura Marling; Hilltop Hoods; Mystery Jets; The High Kings; Example; The Middle East; Rachel Furner

=== Red Bull Music Academy ===
Friday 9 July	Saturday 10 July	Sunday 11 July
Chipmunk; Tinie Tempah; Gabriella Cilmi; Darwin Deez; MemoryHouse; Colm K; Andreya Triana; The Capitals	The Drums; Dirty Projectors; Wild Beasts; Alex Metric; Jackmaster; Space Dimension Controller; Illum Sphere; The Minutes	Broken Social Scene; Delphic; Hudson Mohawke; Jamie Lidell; Local Natives; Cecile; Robot Koch; Planet Parade

=== Dance Arena ===
Friday 9 July	Saturday 10 July	Sunday 11 July
Simian Mobile Disco (DJ Set); Erol Alkan; Vitalic; Aeroplane; Fred Falke; Primary 1; Ou Est le Swimming Pool; Dublin Streets; DJ Church & DJ Gordo	Armand van Helden; A-Trak; Steve Aoki; Louis La Roche; Villa; French Horn Rebellion; Bitches With Wolves; David E. Sugar; Amasis	Steve Angello; Chase & Status; Fake Blood; Jesse Rosse; The Golden Filter; Popof; Al Gibbs; Vogue

Preceded by Oxegen '09	Oxegen; 2010	Succeeded by Oxegen '11
