= Older (Royseven song) =

Single by Royseven

from the album The Art of Insincerity
- B-side: "For You and Me"
- Released: 8 September 2006 (Republic of Ireland)
- Recorded: 2006
- Genre: Rock
- Length: 4:00
- Label: Universal
- Songwriters: Paul Walsh, Sam Garland, Eamonn Barrett, Bernard O'Neill, Darragh Oglesby, Paul O'Hara
- Producer: Marc Carolan

Royseven singles chronology
"Older" (2006)	"Happy Ever Afters" (2006)

"Older" is the debut single by Irish alternative rock band Royseven, released in September 2006 from their debut album, The Art of Insincerity. The song entered the Irish Singles Chart on 14 September where it reached No. 6 for two weeks.
