= The Art of Insincerity =

Studio album by Royseven
- Released: Ireland, 20 October 2006; Germany, 27 April 2007
- Genre: Alternative rock
- Length: 45:25
- Label: Universal
- Producer: Marc Carolan

Royseven chronology
The Art of Insincerity (2006)	You Say, We Say (2011)

Singles from You Say, We Say
- 1. "Older" Released: September 2006; 2. "Happy Ever Afters" Released: October 2006; 3. "I'm Revived" Released: February 2007; 4. "Crash" Released: September 2007

The Art of Insincerity is a debut album released by the Irish alternative rock sextet, Royseven. It was recorded at Grouse Lodge studio and released on 20 October 2006, reaching #17 in the Irish Albums Chart.

The single "Happy Ever Afters" was performed on Tubridy Tonight on 4 November 2006, a show that featured a selection of comic and political guests in the form of Mario Rosenstock, John & Richard Bruton and Des Bishop.

Professional ratings
Review scores
Source	Rating
Cluas	(6.9/10)

== Track listing ==
All lyrics are written by Paul Walsh; all music is composed by Royseven

No.	Title	Length
1.	"Older"	4:00
2.	"Happy Ever Afters"	3:44
3.	"Crash"	4:20
4.	"Roy"	2:52
5.	"Aberdeen"	5:01
6.	"February"	4:25
7.	"I'm Revived"	3:40
8.	"I Laughed Alone"	5:41
9.	"In Your Bedroom"	3:51
10.	"Revenge in Blue"	5:20
11.	"Send Me to Hell"	4:41
Total length:		45:35
