= Crash (Royseven song) =

Single by Royseven

from the album The Art of Insincerity
- Released: September 14, 2007
- Recorded: 2007
- Genre: Rock
- Length: 4:00
- Label: Universal
- Songwriter(s): Paul Walsh, Sam Garland, Eamonn Barrett, Bernard O'Neill, Darragh Oglesby, Paul O'Hara
- Producer(s): Marc Carolan

Royseven singles chronology
"I'm Revived" (2007)	"Crash" (2007)	"Killer" (2010)

"Crash" is a song by the Irish alternative rock sestet, Royseven, found on their debut album, The Art of Insincerity. The song was released as their debut single in Germany in January 2007 and in Ireland as their fourth single on September 14, 2007.

== Live performances ==
"Crash" is regarded as one of their best songs by fans and is eagerly anticipated at live performances. One such performance was on The Cafe on 15 March 2007.
