= The Blizzards =

Irish band

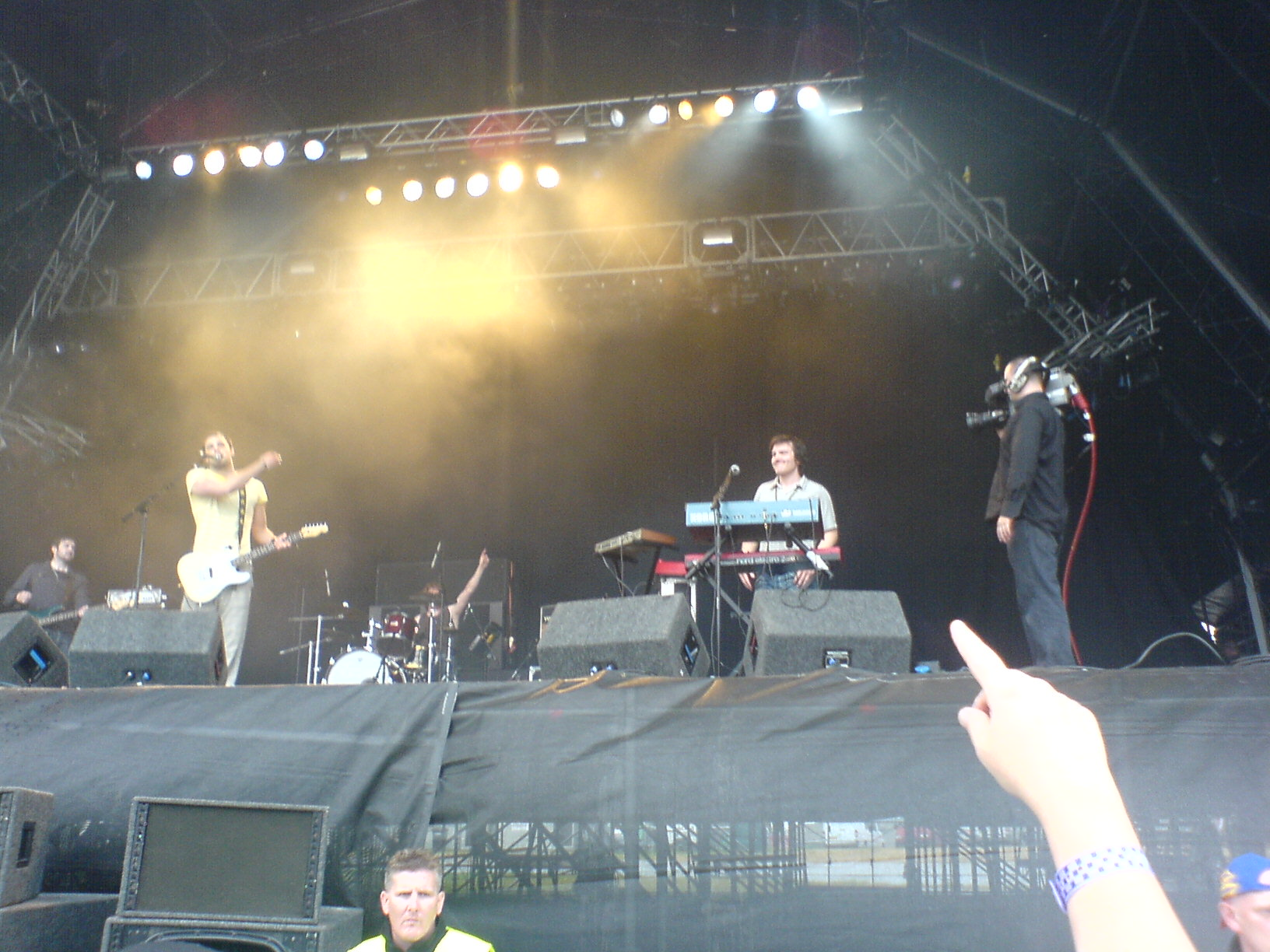
- The Blizzards performing on the NME Stage at Oxegen 2006

Background information
- Origin: Mullingar, Westmeath, Ireland
- Genres: Ska-pop, Post-punk revival
- Years active: 2003–present (hiatus: 2009–2016)
- Labels: Universal Music Ireland, Island
- Members: Niall Breslin; Justin Ryan; Dec Murphy; Aidan Lynch; Anthony Doran; Louize Carroll

The Blizzards are an Irish band from Mullingar in County Westmeath. They were formed by Niall Breslin in late 2004, and also feature Dec Murphy (drums), Justin Ryan, Anthony Doran, Louize Carroll (bass) and Aidan Lynch (keyboards). They have achieved multiple platinum record sales and have won numerous awards.

Their debut single, the self-released "First Girl to Leave Town", entered the Irish Singles Chart at number 11 in 2005. The band were then signed to Universal Music Ireland, and soon had two top ten singles in Ireland with "Trouble" and "Fantasy". Their debut album, A Public Display of Affection, was released in October 2006. The album achieved platinum status in Ireland, with sales of 15,000.

The band's second album Domino Effect was released in 2008. The band entered the Irish Singles Chart at number two and spawned four singles, the top three track "Trust Me, I'm a Doctor" plus "The Reason", "Postcards" and "Buy It Sell It". In 2009, they signed a UK record deal with Island Records which would see the release of Domino Effect there.

The band performed annually at Oxegen, have headlined Indiependence and also supported Oasis at Slane Concert in June 2009. Other bands they have supported include Kaiser Chiefs, The Prodigy and AC/DC during their Black Ice World Tour. A headline show at Dublin's Olympia Theatre on 12 December 2009 was their last before they went on hiatus.

In May 2010 as frontman Niall Breslin (Bressie) was away in London pursuing his career as a music producer, the other four members formed an 80's cover band entitled "House Party" playing shows in Dublin's Crawdaddy venue and Sligo's Garavogue Bar. Bass player Anthony Doran and Drummer Dec Murphy then took over John Daly's Bar in their hometown of Mullingar which they managed together for a couple of years. Dec is now involved in managing multiple other bars around the country, including the likes of Kodiak in Rathmines and Caribou in Dublin City.

2016 saw the band return from hiatus with their single "Drop Down The Anchor" and its follow-up, "Perfect on Paper". In 2019, they released their third album, The Last Great Algorithm.

In 2022 the band released their 4th album 'Sometimes We See More In The Dark' on Warner Music. They album was produced and mixed by Aidan Cunningham and went to No.1 on the Irish Independent album charts.

== Early career ==
The band's independently released debut single "First Girl to Leave Town" went to number 11 in the Irish Singles Chart in 2005. In July of that year, the band performed at Oxegen 2005. The following year the band signed a recording contract with Universal Music Ireland with the band's second single "Trouble" reaching number six in the Irish Singles Chart in spring 2006. The single stayed in the top forty for four weeks. Follow-up singles "Miss Fantasia Preaches" and "War of Words" were released in August and October 2006 respectively. In July the following year, The Blizzards performed at Oxegen 2006, moving up on the billing to perform on the NME stage on this occasion.

== A Public Display of Affection ==
A Public Display of Affection, the debut album of The Blizzards, was released in November 2006. It was produced by US producer Michael Beinhorn, who has previously worked with Red Hot Chili Peppers, Korn, Soundgarden and Marilyn Manson, and debuted at number four in the Irish Albums Chart. Although critical responses to the album were generally positive, the album remained in the top fifty for only three weeks. However, the band's growing popularity saw the album re-enter the charts in early 2007. A Public Display of Affection reached number 21 in the Irish Albums Chart and remained in the top fifty for 18 weeks from January to June 2007. Two further singles, "Fantasy" and "On the Right Track" were released in 2007 before a Main Stage appearance at Oxegen 2007.

== Domino Effect ==
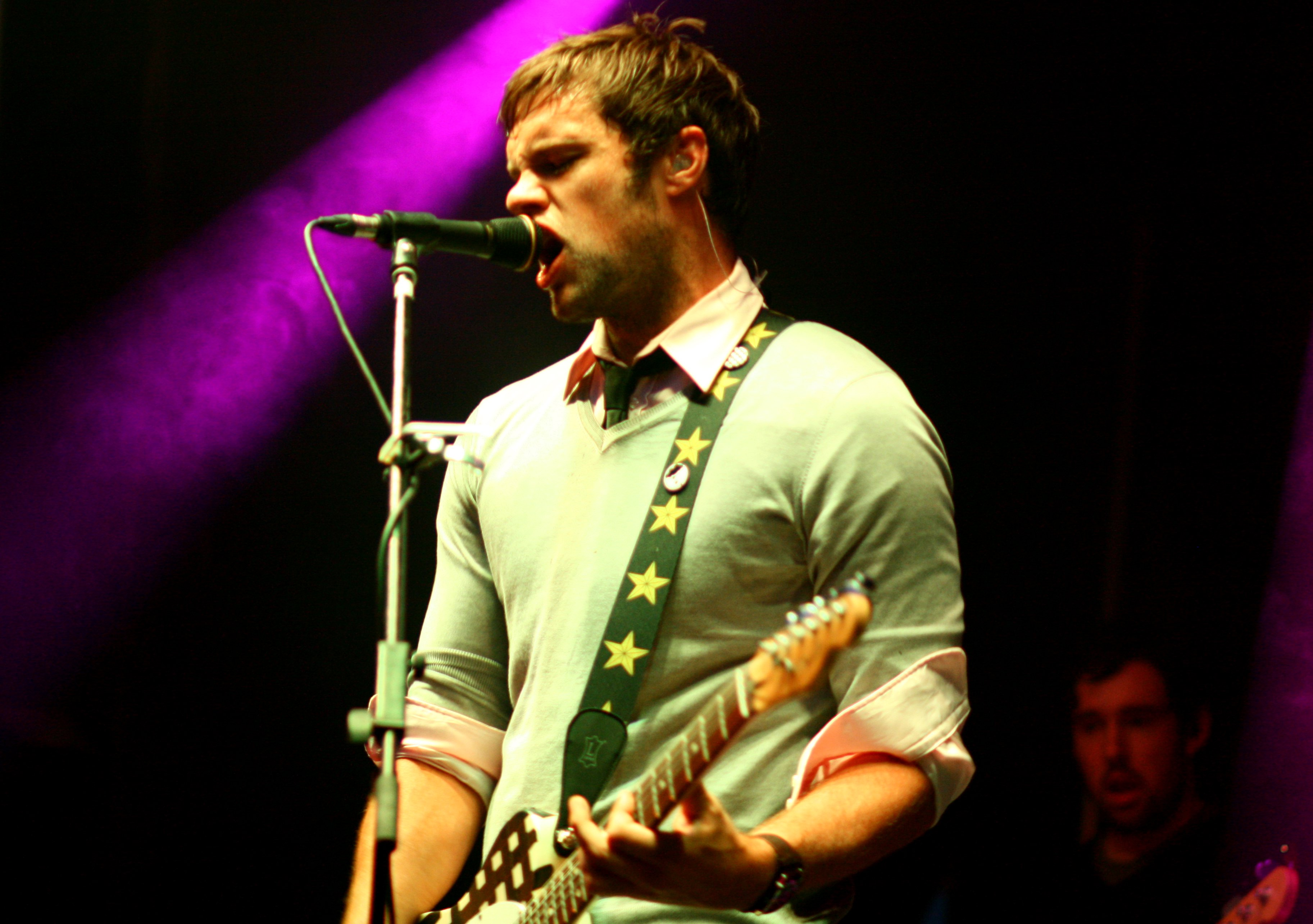
Niall Breslin performing at Junction Festival.

In late June 2008, the band confirmed via their official website that work on their second album had been completed. Produced once again by Michael Beinhorn, Domino Effect was released on 12 September, with a single entitled "Trust Me, I'm A Doctor" released in July. The single, alongside other new and old material as well as a cover of Sam Sparro's "Black and Gold", was performed during their 13 July hour-long set on the Main Stage of Oxegen 2008 in front of an estimated 50,000 people. When 10,000 people turned up to watch The Blizzards headline the free Indie-pendence festival in August 2008, the organiser realised that the festival needed to expand the following year. A string of Irish dates was then announced for September and October 2008, taking in Naas, Waterford, Carlow, Bundoran, Castlebar, Portlaoise, Cork, Limerick, Drogheda, Dublin and Galway. They were selected by the organisers of Hard Working Class Heroes alongside acts such as Giveamanakick and Heathers to play the CMJ Festival in New York in October 2008.

The Blizzards released their second album, Domino Effect on 15 September 2008 to mostly positive reviews, with entertainment.ie stating the album "does a concrete job in guiding the sextet through their new-found maturity". The album peaked at number two on the Irish Albums Chart, losing out to Metallica's Death Magnetic. The lead single from the album, "Trust Me, I'm A Doctor" was released on 29 August 2008, going straight to the top of the download charts and debuting at number two on the Irish Singles Chart, again just being beaten to the top spot, this time by the Katy Perry single "I Kissed a Girl". "Trust Me, I'm A Doctor" remained in the top ten for four weeks before dropping down to number 13 on 10 October. The second single from the band's second album was "The Reason". The video for the album's third single, "Postcards", premiered on the website of the Irish Independent in February 2009. The song was performed live on Tubridy Tonight on 28 February and on The Cafe on 13 March. The band also covered "Up" by pop group The Saturdays. On 15 March 2009, they performed at Nelson's Column as part of the Saint Patrick's Day celebrations in London. The Blizzards performed at the 2009 Meteor Awards at the RDS, Dublin on 17 March 2009 where they won the meteor for best live performance. The band performed an online gig on 27 May 2009. They did Slane Concert in June. Their appearance at Oxegen 2009 in July saw them "confident, tight and facing a packed arena". They were also announced as a support act of AC/DC at short notice after Thin Lizzy cancelled when their drummer Tommy Aldridge broke his collarbone in a cycling accident.

In the summer of 2009, the band did a regional UK tour and released their first UK single, "Buy It Sell It". In August 2009, it was announced that The Blizzards had achieved a UK record deal with Island Records. Their "Trust Me, I'm A Doctor" single was released there on 28 September 2009. Their Domino Effect album was released there on 12 October 2009. Their single "And Another Thing...", written in conjunction with Eoin Colfer's And Another Thing... novel from The Hitchhiker's Guide to the Galaxy series, was also released in the United Kingdom.

The Blizzards took part in the Arthur's Day events in Dublin on 24 September 2009. They played the Olympia Theatre, Dublin on 12 December 2009, their biggest headline show to date. The show had sold out several months in advance. In January 2010, The Blizzards went on hiatus.

The Blizzards's single "Buy It Sell It" featured in episode 116: "What Are You Doin' in My Life?" of the hit US series Cougar Town, airing 3 March 2010.

== Return from hiatus ==
In late 2015, The Blizzards announced via their Twitter account that they were returning to the studio as a full band to make new music.

On 18 May 2016, the band premiered their single, "Drop Down The Anchor", on Today FM's Dermot and Dave show. The song was produced by Philip Magee and recorded in Camden Recording Studios in Dublin. The single was officially released on 30 June 2016.

In late June 2016, The Blizzards returned to live shows with a short Scottish tour. On 1 July, they played their first Irish show in six years at Whelan's Live which sold out in days. The group played various Irish festivals including Indiependence and Electric Picnic.

Their latest single, "Perfect on Paper" premiered on 7 September on Today FM and was released on 7 October 2016.

The Blizzards made their return to the Olympia Theatre on 19 November 2016.

The Blizzards supported The 1975 on 17 June 2017 at Malahide Castle.

On 11 October 2021, The Blizzards announced that they would release a new version of their hit 'Trust Me I'm A Doctor' recorded with the RTÉ Concert Orchestra, in aid of Heroes Aid, a charity founded during the COVID-19 pandemic to support frontline staff in Ireland.

On 13 May 2022, The Blizzards released their 4th studio album 'Sometimes We See More In The Dark' through Warner Music. The album sees the band return to a more natural indie rock style which can be heard from the album singles 'Friction Burns', 'Trigger Me' 'Play God' and 'Great Party'. The album was produced and mixed by Aidan Cunningham who is known for capturing the raw energy of bands on to record.

== Style ==
The Blizzards are a self-described pop band and although critics often refer to them as very bad examples of indie-pop, lead singer Niall Breslin, said that "I don't think Indie exists any more. I just think Indie is gone. Everyone who gets played on daytime radio is a pop band. Indie was around for Oasis. Indie was around for Blur. There's none of them bands left." When writing their second album, lead singer Niall Breslin said "We were told by a few people that the first album didn't reflect the energy of the live shows, so that's what we were aiming for this time around,". After the album's completion he stated "We couldn't be happier with the end result – it's exactly what we were aiming for."

== Television/radio appearances ==
Date	Appearance	Notes
2006	The Late Late Show	Performer _{("Trouble")}
2/12/06	Tubridy Tonight	Performer _{("Fantasy")}
21 December 2006	The Cafe	Performer _{("Fantasy")}
21 November 2008	The Cafe	Performer _{("The Reason")}
28 February 2009	Tubridy Tonight	Performer _{("Postcards")}
04/03/09	The Ray Foley Show _{(Today FM)}	Guest
04/03/09	The Will Leahy Show _{(RTÉ 2fm)}	Guest
05/03/09	Fully Charged with Ryan and Tracy _{(Spin 1038)}	Guest
06/03/09	Seoige	Guest (Niall Breslin only)
13 March 2009	The Cafe	Performer _{("Postcards")}
18 March 2009	2009 Meteor Awards	Performer _{("Trust Me, I'm A Doctor")}
2009	Xposé	Interview (Niall Breslin Only)
16 October 2009	The Late Late Show	Performer _{("And Another Thing...")}
2011	The Voice of Ireland	Judge/Coach
23 September 2016	The Late Late Show	Performer
2/11/18	The Late Late Show	Performer _{("I need a win")}

== Discography ==
=== Studio albums ===
Year	Album details	Peak chart positions
Year	Album details	IRL
2006	A Public Display of Affection: Released: October 2006; Label: Universal Music Ireland; Formats: CD, download	4
2008	Domino Effect: Released: September 2008; Label: Universal Music Ireland; Formats: CD, download	2
2019	The Last Great Algorithim: Released: 15 October 2019; Label: Reckless Records; Formats: CD, download	—
2022	Sometimes We See More in the Dark: Released: 13 May 2022; Label: Warner Music Ireland; Formats: CD, download	11
"—" denotes a title that did not chart.

=== Singles ===
Year	Title	Peak chart position	Album
Year	Title	IRL	Album
2005	"First Girl to Leave Town"	11	A Public Display of Affection
2006	"Trouble"	6	A Public Display of Affection
2006	"Miss Fantasia Preaches"	9	A Public Display of Affection
2006	"War of Words"	25	A Public Display of Affection
2007	"Fantasy"	16	A Public Display of Affection
2007	"On the Right Track"	—	A Public Display of Affection
2008	"Trust Me, I'm A Doctor"	2	Domino Effect
2008	"The Reason"	35	Domino Effect
2009	"Postcards"	24	Domino Effect
2009	"Buy It Sell It"	—	Domino Effect
2016	"Drop Down the Anchor"	—	
2016	"Perfect on Paper"	—	
2021	"Friction Burns"	—	Sometimes We See More In The Dark
2021	"Trigger Me"	—	Sometimes We See More In The Dark
2022	"Play God"	—	Sometimes We See More In The Dark
"—" denotes a title that did not chart.

Trust Me I'm A Doctor
From Domino Effect (2008)

Fantasy
From A Public Display of Affection(2006)

Trouble
From A Public Display of Affection(2006)

== Awards ==
The Blizzards are multiple Meteor Award nominees and winners.

They received the award for Best Irish Live Performance at the 2009 Meteor Awards. They were nominated in the category of Best Irish Pop Act at the 2010 Meteor Awards.

Year	Nominee / work	Award	Result
2008	The Blizzards	Best Irish Pop Act	Nominated
2008	Oxegen 2007	Best Irish Live Performance	Won
2009	The Blizzards	Best Irish Band	Nominated
2009	The Blizzards	Best Irish Pop Act	Nominated
2009	Oxegen 2008	Best Irish Live Performance	Won
2010	The Blizzards	Best Irish Pop Act	Nominated
2022	Irish Album Charts	Independent Album Chart	No. 1
