= You Say, We Say =

Studio album by Royseven
- Released: (Republic of Ireland) March 11, 2011 (Germany) April 1, 2011
- Recorded: November 2009 – July 2010; Boogie Park Studios; Hamburg, Germany
- Genre: Alternative rock
- Length: 36:59
- Label: (Republic of Ireland) Roadrunner (Germany) Sony
- Producer: Andreas Herbig

Royseven chronology
The Art of Insincerity (2006)	You Say, We Say (2011)

Singles from You Say, We Say
- 1. "Killer" Released: 19 November 2010; 2. "We Should Be Lovers" Released: 19 February 2011

You Say, We Say is the second studio album by Irish alternative rock band Royseven. It was released in Ireland on 11 March 2011. It was preceded by the lead single, "Killer", on 19 November 2010 and followed by second single "We Should Be Lovers" on 19 February 2011. "We Should Be Lovers" went on to become the most played Irish song on radio in 2011, beating rivals Westlife, The Script and Snow Patrol.

The album was produced by Andreas Herbig at Boogie Park Studios in Hamburg, Germany.

== Track listing ==
All tracks are written by Royseven

No.	Title	Length
1.	"We Should Be Lovers"	3:55
2.	"I Need To Know Your Name"	2:54
3.	"You Say, We Say"	2:47
4.	"Channel 103 On My T.V."	2:51
5.	"No Romance"	2:52
6.	"The Big Blue"	4:10
7.	"Dance, Dance, Dance"	3:48
8.	"Killer"	2:58
9.	"You Can't Hide That"	3:07
10.	"Every Line's The Last One"	2:38
11.	"Walls"	4:03
12.	"We March On"	3:36
Total length:		36:59

== Charts ==
Chart (2011)	Peak position
Irish Albums Chart	15

== Credits ==
Royseven

- Paul Walsh — Lead vocals
- Sam Garland — Lead guitarist
- Eamonn Barrett — Rhythm guitar
- Bernard O'Neill — Bass
- Paul O'Hara — Keyboard
- Darragh Oglesby — Drums

Production

- Produced by Andreas Herbig
- Recorded and mixed by Andreas Herbig at Boogie Park Studio, Hamburg, Germany
- Mastered by Michael Schwabe
