= Trust Me, I'm a Doctor (song) =

"Trust Me, I'm A Doctor"

Single by The Blizzards

from the album Domino Effect
- Released: 22 August 2008
- Genre: Pop
- Label: Universal Music Ireland
- Songwriter(s): Niall Breslin
- Producer(s): Michael Beinhorn

The Blizzards singles chronology
| "Fantasy" (2007) | "Trust Me, I'm A Doctor" (2008) | "The Reason" (2008) |

"Trust Me, I'm A Doctor" is the lead single of the second album, Domino Effect by Westmeath indie-rock band, The Blizzards. The song was released on 22 August 2008. It debuted at number two on the Irish Singles Chart.

== Song information ==
The song has been well received critically as well as commercially with a review of the album by State.ie describing the song as, "' La la la la” backing vocals and frantic vocal pace is infuriatingly catchy and State has had it lodged in our brains for the last three weeks after just one airing".

== Track listing ==
1. "Trust Me, I'm A Doctor" (Single Version)
2. "Dublin Town"

== Chart performance ==
The single debuted on the Irish Singles Chart at number 2, being beaten from the top spot by Katy Perry's single "I Kissed a Girl". Fighting off tough competition from the likes of long established acts such as Rihanna and Boyzone, the single managed to stay on the Top 10 for five weeks until dropping down to number 13. As of 23 October had spent a total of 8 weeks in the Top 40 making it the most commercially successful single by the Blizzards to date. The song was also featured on the comedy Gavin & Stacey.

| Chart (2008) | Peak Position |
|---|---|
| Irish Singles Chart | 2 |
