= Oxegen 2013 =

Music festival in Ireland

- Genre: Dance
- Dates: 2–4 August 2013
- Locations: Punchestown Racecourse, County Kildare, Ireland
- Website: www.oxegen.ie

Oxegen 2013 was the ninth Oxegen festival to take place since 2004. It took place on the weekend of Friday 2 August, Saturday, 3 August and Sunday, 4 August at Punchestown Racecourse near Naas in County Kildare, Ireland.

It was confirmed on the official Oxegen website in April 2013 that the festival would return to the Irish festival line-up this summer, after a one-year hiatus in 2012.

On 22 April an announcement was made to confirm the first set of acts playing. Confirmed were Calvin Harris, Rizzle Kicks, Jack Beats, Duke Dumont, Example, Pitbull, Nero. On 24 April David Guetta was announced as one of the headline acts along with Example and Snoop Dogg.

There was rain on the Saturday with around 25,000 fans present and more than 600 gardai and 1,000 stewards patrolling the site.

== Line Up ==
Earliest performer listed first in each list.

=== Friday 2 August ===
The following artists played on the Red Bull Electric ballroom stage

- Eli & Fur - 20:00 Start
- Fake Blood - 21:00 Start
- Sasha - 22:00 Start
- Otto Knows - 23:00 Start
- Alesso - 00:00 Start

=== Saturday 3 August ===
The following artists played on the Heineken Live Project main stage

- Gin N Juice - 13:30 Start
- Iggy Azalea - Cancelled set due to illness
- The Original Rudeboys
- DJ Vincent Stuart
- Naughty Boy
- DJ Fresh
- Rita Ora
- Labrinth
- Example
- Calvin Harris - 00:00 Start

The following artists played on the Red Bull Electric ballroom stage

- Jamie Byrne - 13:30 Start
- Jordan Kaye
- Hix
- Paul Webb
- Rory Lynam
- Jacob Plant
- Dead Prezidents
- Erol Alkan
- Nero
- 2manydjs - 00:00 Start

The following artists played on the Other stage

- Reuben Keeney - 13:30 Start
- Dec Byrne
- David McGoff
- Mulljoy
- Yunisun
- Simon Says
- Dave Devalera
- Congorock - 20:30 Start

=== Sunday 4 August ===
The following artists played on the Heineken Live Project main Stage

- Monsta - 13:30 Start
- Devlin
- Wretch 32
- DJ Tommy Truffles
- Rizzle Kicks
- Pitbull
- Snoop Dogg
- Chase & Status
- David Guetta - 23:40 Start

The following artists played on the Red Bull Electric ballroom stage

- The Hijackers - 13:30 Start
- Dashka & Remik
- Rhythm Scene
- Fred & Darragh Flynn
- Al Gibbs
- John Gibbons
- Borgore
- Crookers
- Duke Dumont
- Dimitri Vegas & Like Mike
- Nicky Romero - 00:00 Start

The following artists played on the Other stage

- G Frequency - 14:30 Start
- Mr. Devitt
- Razor
- Cause & Effect
- Ayah Marrar
- Jack Beats
- Danny Byrd - 20:40 Start

== See also ==
- List of electronic music festivals
- Live electronic music
