= Moone Boy =

Irish sitcom

- Genre: Sitcom
- Created by: Chris O'Dowd
- Written by: Chris O'Dowd; Nick Vincent Murphy
- Directed by: Declan Lowney; Ian Fitzgibbon; Chris O'Dowd
- Starring: Chris O'Dowd; David Rawle; Deirdre O'Kane; Peter McDonald; Ian O’Reilly; Aoife Duffin; Clare Monnelly; Sarah White
- Theme music composer: The Sultans of Ping FC
- Opening theme: "Where's Me Jumper"
- Composer: Rónán Johnston
- Country of origin: Ireland
- Original language: English
- No. of series: 3
- No. of episodes: 18

Production
- Running time: 22 min
- Production companies: Baby Cow Productions; Sprout Pictures; Hot Cod Productions; Grand Pictures

Original release
- Network: Sky One
- Release: 14 September 2012 – 6 April 2015

Moone Boy is an Irish sitcom created, co-written by and co-starring Chris O'Dowd for British broadcaster Sky One. The series is co-written by Nick Vincent Murphy and is produced by Baby Cow Productions, Sprout Pictures, Hot Cod Productions, and Grand Pictures. The series is semi-autobiographical of O'Dowd and focuses on a young boy's life growing up in Boyle, County Roscommon, in the west of Ireland in the late 1980s and early 1990s. Moone Boy is the second series produced from Sky One's Little Crackers shorts and is inspired by O'Dowd's contribution, "Capturing Santa", which was produced by Sprout Pictures.

The introductory music for much of each episode is "Tico's Tune" by Geoff Love (recorded by him under the name "Manuel & The Music of the Mountains"). This piece of music has near-iconic status in Ireland as it was used as the theme music for The Gay Byrne Show, a long-running and immensely popular morning radio show on RTÉ Radio 1. Background music and soundtrack pieces were composed for the series by Rónán Johnston. The opening credits are accompanied with the song "Where's Me Jumper" by The Sultans of Ping FC.

Moone Boy aired its third and final series in 2015.

== Synopsis ==
Seán Murphy is the imaginary friend of 12-year-old Martin Moone, the only boy in a family living in Boyle, a small town in the north of County Roscommon in the rural West of Ireland. Martin, aided by his imaginary friend, has a unique perspective on life. His imagination comes into play both in his childish drawings, which come alive through animation, and in the ridiculous schemes he comes up with, against Seán's better judgement. With Seán's help, Martin negotiates life as the youngest member of a chaotic, scatterbrained family.

== Production ==
Chris O'Dowd said: "Moone Boy is a fantastic comedy which centres on a twelve-year-old boy who has an imaginary friend. It is set in the late eighties/early nineties and all of the experiences are ones that I had. It's a really funny show which has loads of animation and a number of laughs that I hope people will love. It was essential to film in Ireland and what was great about Sky was they wanted us to film here and they were really supportive. That wouldn't have happened at any other channel."

Moone Boy is Sky's second commission based on a Little Crackers short. The series is a co-production between Sprout Pictures, who produced the original Little Crackers short, Baby Cow Productions, Hot Cod Productions and Grand Pictures, and began filming in early 2012 on location in Boyle and other places in County Roscommon, as well as County Wicklow.

== Cast ==
- Chris O'Dowd as Seán Caution Murphy
- David Rawle as Martin Moone
- Deirdre O'Kane as Debra Moone
- Peter McDonald as Liam Moone
- Ian O'Reilly as Padraic O'Dwyer
- Aoife Duffin as Trisha Moone
- Clare Monnelly as Fidelma Moone
- Sarah White as Sinéad Moone
- Steve Coogan as Francie "Touchy" Fehily
- Evan O'Hanlon as Paulie
- Johnny Vegas as Crunchie Haystacks
- Steve Wall as Danny Moone
- Norma Sheahan as Linda
- Ronan Raftery as Dessie
- Tom Hickey as Granddad Joe
- Mark Doherty as Fr. Linehan

== Episodes ==
=== Series 1 (2012) ===
No.	Title	Directed by	Written by	UK Ratings	Original release date
1	"Men of the Houses"	Declan Lowney	Chris O'Dowd & Nick Vincent Murphy	698,000	14 September 2012
Martin celebrates his 12th birthday. While his sisters don't exactly go all-out with their gifts, Martin is thrilled with his Readybix bike from Mam and Dad, although it doesn't last long when the local bullies, Jonner and Conner Bonnor (Who Sleep in Beds at Nighttime in Pyjamas) decide to intervene. Dad tries to even the score with the Bonner brothers with unexpected consequences i.e. he finds a soul mate in their father.
2	"Bunch of Marys"	Declan Lowney	Chris O'Dowd & Nick Vincent Murphy	543,000	14 September 2012
Martin befriends new boy Trevor to dine on his family's regular gourmet meals while Debra is too distracted with political campaigning to feed her youngest child. Ma Moone and her friends hope to incite "girl power" in the local area by canvassing for politician Prof. Mary Robinson during the Presidential Election of 1990. However, they're less than thrilled when they're forced to turn to fishy rich man Francie "Touchie" Feeley (Steve Coogan) for funding.
3	"Another Prick in the Wall"	Declan Lowney	Chris O'Dowd & Nick Vincent Murphy	483,000	21 September 2012
Using the battle for the bathroom as an opportunity to catch extra zeds, Martin falls foul of Sinéad's pranks when she covers him in make-up while he's asleep. Unable to get to a mirror, Martin heads off to school unaware of his new look. He then discovers a short cut to school which will stop him falling prey to his sister's pranks.
4	"Dark Side of the Moone"	Declan Lowney	Chris O'Dowd & Nick Vincent Murphy	Under 383,000	28 September 2012
Uncle Danny (Steve Wall) arrives just in time for Martin's birds-and-the-bees talk with Mam and Dad. Seán seeks solace with other imaginary friends when Martin dumps him under the influence of his visiting musician uncle. When Danny shows the pictures of his travels, when he talks of the French town of Lyon, the picture actually shows the Swiss city of Lausanne with a famous Tl bus.
5	"Godfellas"	Declan Lowney	Chris O'Dowd & Nick Vincent Murphy	Under 382,000	5 October 2012
While Fidelma joins the church choir, Martin's confirmation service leads to an epiphany: he wants to become an altar boy. Has he got what it takes? Can he keep to the Altar Boys Code? What will Ma and Pa Moone think of a son as an Altar Boy and a daughter in the choir?
6	"The Bell-End of an Era"	Declan Lowney	Chris O'Dowd & Nick Vincent Murphy	Under 443,000	12 October 2012
It's a big moment in the life of young Martin Moone: his last week of national school (primary school). Martin and Pádraic have some interesting plans to be remembered in future years. For Sinéad, if she finishes top of her class, the prospect of going to the Girl Guides' Jamboree awaits. For Trisha her exam prospects are somewhat poor and Fidelma has issues with boyfriend Dessie.

=== Series 2 (2014) ===
No.	Title	Directed by	Written by	UK Ratings	Original release date
1	"Boylé, Boylé, Boylé"	Ian Fitzgibbon	Chris O'Dowd & Nick Vincent Murphy	Under 404,000	17 February 2014
Martin is appalled when his dad takes the family on holiday during the 1990 FIFA World Cup, so he tries to hitch-hike back to Boyle to watch a vital match on home turf.
2	"Moone Dance"	Ian Fitzgibbon	Chris O'Dowd & Nick Vincent Murphy	Under 441,000	24 February 2014
It's the dawn of a new era for Martin Moone as he begins secondary school, and while he isn't impressed with his friends' talk about girls, he soon changes his tune when he meets art teacher Miss Tivnan (Amy Huberman), a vision at the blackboard who sparks a romantic rivalry between him and Sean. Meanwhile, Dessie has an important question for Fidelma.
3	"Ghost Raft"	Ian Fitzgibbon	Nick Vincent Murphy	514,000	3 March 2014
Back in the summer, Martin and Padraic started building a raft. They planned to sail down the river into town, buy ice cream and frolic in the water. But now it's October and the raft still isn't quite finished. So instead, they'll make it a Halloween ghost ship.
4	"Handball Duel"	Ian Fitzgibbon	Chris O'Dowd & Nick Vincent Murphy	445,000	10 March 2014
Like all young lads in the early '90s, Martin wants (needs) a Sega Mega Drive. Be gone, slinky; hello, magic machine. But Liam is having none of it: not only is this whole computer thing just a fad, work is slow and money is tight.
5	"Stags And Hens"	Ian Fitzgibbon	Chris O'Dowd & Nick Vincent Murphy	Under 429,000	17 March 2014
Fidelma and Dessie's big day is just a week away and wedding fever has gripped the Moone household.
6	"The Boyle Wedding"	Ian Fitzgibbon	Chris O'Dowd & Nick Vincent Murphy	Under 375,000	24 March 2014
Celebration is in the air as St Patrick's Day dawns, but the Moones are having a different kind of party today: Fidelma's wedding.

=== Series 3 (2015) ===
No.	Title	Directed by	Written by	UK Ratings	Original release date
1	"Where The Streets Do Have Names"	Chris O'Dowd	Chris O'Dowd & Nick Vincent Murphy	376,000	2 March 2015
In September 1991, Liam and Debra abandon the kids for a romantic break to celebrate their 20th anniversary – but it all threatens to fall apart after a chance encounter with Liam's old flame. Meanwhile, Martin and Padraic are in Dublin, where they soon discover new talents.
2	"The Plunder Years"	Chris O'Dowd	Chris O'Dowd & Nick Vincent Murphy	327,000	9 March 2015
Sick of being caught between two warring parents, Padraic goes on the run with Martin. Crunchie Haystacks struggles to cope, too.
3	"Fecks, Lies And Videotape"	Chris O'Dowd	Chris O'Dowd & Nick Vincent Murphy	Under 345,000	16 March 2015
While the Moone house is bursting at the seams, Martin and Padriac try to film a hilarious home video. Sir Terry Wogan guest stars.
4	"Unidentified Feckin' Objects"	Chris O'Dowd	Chris O'Dowd & Nick Vincent Murphy	Under 362,000	23 March 2015
Aliens have landed in Boyle. When crop circles are discovered in their wake, Martin and Padraic couldn't be more thrilled. No sooner have the lads embarked on a UFO hunt than Donkey Kong mysteriously disappears.
5	"Bells 'n' Smells"	Chris O'Dowd	Chris O'Dowd & Nick Vincent Murphy	Under 375,000	30 March 2015
Dessie dreams of opening Boyle's first Catholic bookshop. Also Martin (Noah's identical twin brother) was advised to leave the toilet because of the horrible disgusting rotten smell.
6	"Gershwin's Bucket List"	Chris O'Dowd	Chris O'Dowd & Nick Vincent Murphy	Under 350,000	6 April 2015
Granddad Moone's childhood imaginary friend, George Gershwin, has returned. Paul Rudd guest stars. Note: 45-minute episode [But the version shown in US was the usual length]

== Reception ==
The show has been well received by critics. The Guardian called it "the most life-affirming delight to have hit our screens in a long time", and said: "It is surreal, within decent limits, and it is derivative, but I think the derivations are happily if tacitly acknowledged".

Moone Boy won an International Emmy for Best Comedy and was also nominated for two awards at the 2012 British Comedy Awards. In 2014, it won an IFTA Award for best entertainment programme.

== Home media ==
The first series of Moone Boy was released on DVD on 15 October 2012. The second series of Moone Boy was released on DVD on 31 March 2014. A boxset containing the first two series was also released on 31 March 2014.

== American remake ==
It was announced in October 2014 that the show received a "Put-pilot" from ABC. O'Dowd was said to be a writer and producer, but was not expected to star.
