= We Should Be Lovers =

Single by Royseven

from the album You Say, We Say
- Released: 19 February 2011
- Songwriters: Paul Walsh, Sam Garland, Eamonn Barrett, Bernard O'Neill, Darragh Oglesby, Paul O'Hara

"We Should Be Lovers" is the second single taken from the Royseven album You Say, We Say. It was released on 19 February 2011 and went on to become the most played Irish song on radio that year, beating rivals Westlife, The Script and Snow Patrol.

"We Should Be Lovers" entered the Irish Singles Chart on 24 March 2011 and reached number sixteen, spending six weeks in the chart altogether.

"We Should Be Lovers" was shortlisted for Meteor Choice Music Prize Irish Song of the Year 2011.

The song is approximately 140 BPM

== Live Performances ==
Royseven performed "We Should Be Lovers" on the first live show of The Voice of Ireland on 4 March 2012.
