= Royseven =

Irish alternative rock band

- Origin: Dublin, Ireland
- Genres: Alternative rock; power pop
- Years active: 2003–2014; 2021–present
- Label: Roadrunner
- Members: Paul Walsh; Bernard O'Neill; Darragh Oglesby; Paul O'Hara; Stuart Grey
- Past members: Sam Garland; Eamonn Barrett

Royseven are a six-piece alternative rock band from Dublin, Ireland. They are known for songs such as "Dance" and "We Should Be Lovers", and have released two albums to date: The Art of Insincerity (2006) and You Say, We Say (2011).

Royseven met through mutual friends- and an advert in an Irish music magazine. Singer, Paul Walsh and guitarist Eamonn Barrett, advertised in Hot Press magazine for a drummer, they interviewed several but quickly decided on Darragh Oglesby. It was he who suggested keyboard player Paul O’Hara and when their first bass player Andrew (Drew) Kennedy (blancatransfer) left, Oglesby identified a replacement duo to bolster the line-up even more. So, bass player Bernard O’Neill and guitarist Sam Garland soon after completed the Royseven family and although they’d all been in bands before, this was the first time it felt right from the first rehearsal.

On 31 March 2014 Royseven disbanded after 11 years together. In February 2021, they announced that they reformed and were recording new music.

== History ==
=== Formation, debut album (2003-2009) ===
Royseven formed in September 2003, they received record company interest in 2004, ultimately signing a deal with the Universal Music Group in 2005. Their debut album "The Art of Insincerity" was recorded in Grouse Lodge studios, Westmeath in late 2005 and was released in Ireland in October 2006, charting at No. 17. The first single from the album, "Older" charted at No. 6. "Crash" the fourth single taken from "The Art of Insincerity", was released on 14 September 2007 and used in a VW advertising campaign. The album was produced by Marc Carolan who is better known as the front of house engineer for Muse. The album was released in Germany, Austria and Switzerland in 2006 and coincided with tours of those countries and support shows. Royseven received the"Hope for 2007" award at the Meteor Awards of that year and were nominated the No. 1 Viewers choice on Other Voices (RTE2), plus the Best Band accolade at the Balcony TV Awards.

Royseven performed at Oxegen 2007 and supported Kaiser Chiefs and The Fratellis at Bud Rising in Marlay Park in August 2007. Royseven also toured extensively throughout Europe whilst promoting "The art of insincerity". Performing to thousands of people at gigs such as:

-Rock Am Ring

-Rock im park

-Oxygen Festival

-Electric Picnic

-Montreux Jazz Festival

-World Cup Fan Fest

-Bryan Adams European Tour

-Raemonn European Tour

-Bayern 3 Radio Fest

=== Second album (2010 - 2014) ===
In 2009 Royseven signed a new record contract with Road Runner Records (WMG), And began the recording of their second album alongside internationally acclaimed producer Andreas Herbig in Hamburg, Germany on 6 November 2009. Royseven completed the recording of their second album "You Say, We Say" in July 2010. It was released in Ireland on Friday 11 March 2011. The album peaked at number 1 in the iTunes Album Chart in August 2011 and is set to be released in Germany in 2012. The first Irish single taken from the album was "Killer" and the second "We Should Be Lovers". "We Should Be Lovers" became the most played Irish song on Irish radio in 2011 and is also the lead track featured on a new German film due for release in May 2012. Royseven released "Dance" and "No Romance" as their 3rd and 4th singles from the album- both of which also made it to the top 30 songs played on Irish radio in 2011. The band won "Best Rock Newcomer" award at the 2011 VW Sound Foundation, following the award, "We should be lovers" was commissioned for the global advertising campaign for VW's latest creation, the "UP" car.

Royseven promotion of " You Say, We Say" has seen them perform throughout European venues alongside acts such as OneRepublic, Kaiser Chiefs and Duran Duran.

"We Should Be Lovers" was the most played Irish song on radio in 2011.

Royseven have secured numerous Syncs for TV and Ad Campaigns throughout Ireland and the U.K, Royseven currently have the title track on a new German Blockbuster Movie Due to Premier in March 2012.

== Split (March 2014) ==
On 31 March 2014, the band posted to their Facebook page that they would be splitting up. They thanked their fans and everyone they had worked with:

"Dear All,

With heavy hearts we’ve decided to bring down the curtain on our Royseven adventure. Rather than disappointment, we feel an overwhelming sense of gratitude and satisfaction for the last eleven years of creativity, performance and friendship. To those in Ireland, Germany, Switzerland and Great Britain who worked with us, supported or encouraged us, we’d like to thank you for helping to create experiences that were once mere childhood dreams. We each intend to continue writing and performing but this musical chapter has come to an end. We’ll be forever grateful for the wonderful memories you’ve gifted us. Thank you so very much, one and all.

Royseven – Paul, Eamonn, Dazzy, Lego, Sam, Bernard. xxx"

== Touring ==
=== Support slots ===
- Royseven supported Kaiser Chiefs and The Fratellis at Bud Rising in Marlay Park in August 2007.
- Royseven supported Codes and The Coronas in November and December 2010, and in August 2011.
- Royseven supported American pop rock band OneRepublic in the German cities of Dortmund and Munich on 24 and 25 April 2011.
- Royseven supported Kaiser Chiefs in Dublin's Olympia Theatre on 23 August 2011.
- Royseven supported The Coronas in Killarney's INEC on 28 December 2011.
- Royseven supported Duran Duran in the 02 Dec 22 2011
- Royseven supported The Coronas at Live In The Marquee 15 June

== Members ==
Current members

Paul Walsh, (Lead vocals) and chief songwriter grew up in Clonmel, County Tipperary in a family of musicians and performers (his father was a showband saxophonist and clarinet player). Paul studied the piano as a child and started playing the guitar at twelve years of age; it was then that he started writing songs. He joined his first original band (Swerve) at the age of fourteen and played with them for four years. During his teenage years he also performed character roles in over 15 musicals and plays and undertook voice training at the Leinster School of Music. He relocated to London to attend university where he continued to receive formal voice training. He moved to Dublin to join Jove. Over the years he has presented various shows for RTÉ, including TTV and Off the Wall.

Bernard O'Neill, (Bass) is a qualified sound engineer. He started playing the bass guitar when he was thirteen and was in a band called Maened for five years. At the age of 19 he went to Pulse recording college and qualified with a City and Guilds Certificate in Sound Engineering (basic and advanced). Bernard performed with Jenny Linfors on her first album and toured with her for three years. He was the production manager at the Factory Studios in Dublin. Bernard has engineered such bands and musicians as: The Corrs, Elvis Costello, Nick Cave, Bob Dylan, Sarah McLachlan, Britney Spears and Van Morrison - all in his capacity at the Factory Studios.

Paul O'Hara, (Keyboard) started playing the piano at the age of fourteen. He is self-taught and has played with Housebroken (led by The Commitments actor Robert Arkins) - who won the Sunday World Band of the Year Competition - and with Liquid Wheel who won a hot press award for Dance act of the year. Lego has recorded in Rac Studios and Windmill Lane Studios in Dublin. In total he has performed on two albums and three EPS (reaching the top twenty in Ireland and the Cool Cuts Charts in the UK). Lego has performed at Féile, Oxegen and the Point Depot in Dublin. In addition he has played on the same bill as Moby, David Holmes and Carl Cox in the SFX, Dublin.

Darragh Oglesby, (Drums) is a fourth generation drummer. He started playing drums in the Artane Boys Band at the age of seven, where he remained for ten years, studying percussion and xylophone. During these years in performed in Carnegie Hall, Rushka Stadium (in Moscow), Sky Dome in Toronto and on Irish National television on several occasions. A one-time roadie with Irish rock band Aslan, Dazzy is currently a session drummer for countless acts throughout the country when not busy with Royseven. Dazzy also plays the piano and guitar and has studied at the Walton School of Music in Dublin.

Former members

Sam Garland, (Guitar) started playing the guitar at the age of 9. He studied classical guitar from the age of 13 to 20. He then continued his studies in the Dublin Institute of Technology for two years majoring in classical guitar and piano attaining a grade certificate in classical guitar performance and sight reading. He travelled to California in 2000 for a year where he met guitar-smith Tom Anderson. He then completed a sound engineering course at the Sound Training Centre, Dublin achieving two City and Guilds diplomas with distinctions. He had been working as a sound engineer for four years in the factory studios in Dublin, while also performing and rehearsing in various bands. He has an identical twin.

Eamonn Barrett, (Guitar) comes from a family of musicians. He is a self-taught guitar player who has featured in several original bands. He also played with Velveteen at the Manchester in the City Festival where they were voted one of the top ten bands at the festival by the NME. In addition, played and released with the Lost Poets including performances in the Olympia Theatre and the Point Theatre in Dublin. Eamonn toured the East Coast of the United States with the Brilliant Trees in 1998. He is also a popular DJ in Dublin city and has performed in the Red Box and the Morrison hotel to name but a few. He appeared in a recent Guinness Draught advert as part of a worldwide PR campaign for the drinks company.

== Discography ==
=== Studio albums ===
Year	Album details	Peak chart positions
Year	Album details	IRL
2006	The Art of Insincerity: Released: 20 October 2006; Label: Universal; Formats: CD, Download	17
2011	You Say, We Say: Released: 11 March 2011; Label: Roadrunner; Formats: CD, Download	15
"—" denotes a title that did not chart.

=== Singles ===
Year	Single	Peak chart position	Album
Year	Single	IRL	Album
2006	"Older"	6	The Art of Insincerity
2006	"Happy Ever Afters"	—	The Art of Insincerity
2006	"Crash"	22	The Art of Insincerity
2007	"I'm Revived"	26	The Art of Insincerity
2010	"Killer"	30	You Say, We Say
2011	"We Should Be Lovers"	16	You Say, We Say
2011	"Dance"	—	You Say, We Say
2011	"No Romance"	—	You Say, We Say
2012	"Walls"	—	You Say, We Say
2012	"Sidelines"	14	Non-album singles
2022	"L.O.V.E."	—	Non-album singles
"—" denotes a title that did not chart.

== Awards ==
- On 1 February 2007, Royseven received the Hope for 2007 award at the 2007 Meteor Awards.
- Royseven won the Best Band Award at the Balcony TV Awards 2007.
- Royseven won "Best Newcomer For Rock" award at the 2011 VW Sound Foundation.
- Royseven have been nominated for "Song of the year" at the Meteor Choice Awards 2012 with " We Should Be Lovers"
