= Niall Breslin =

Irish musician and rugby player (born 1980)

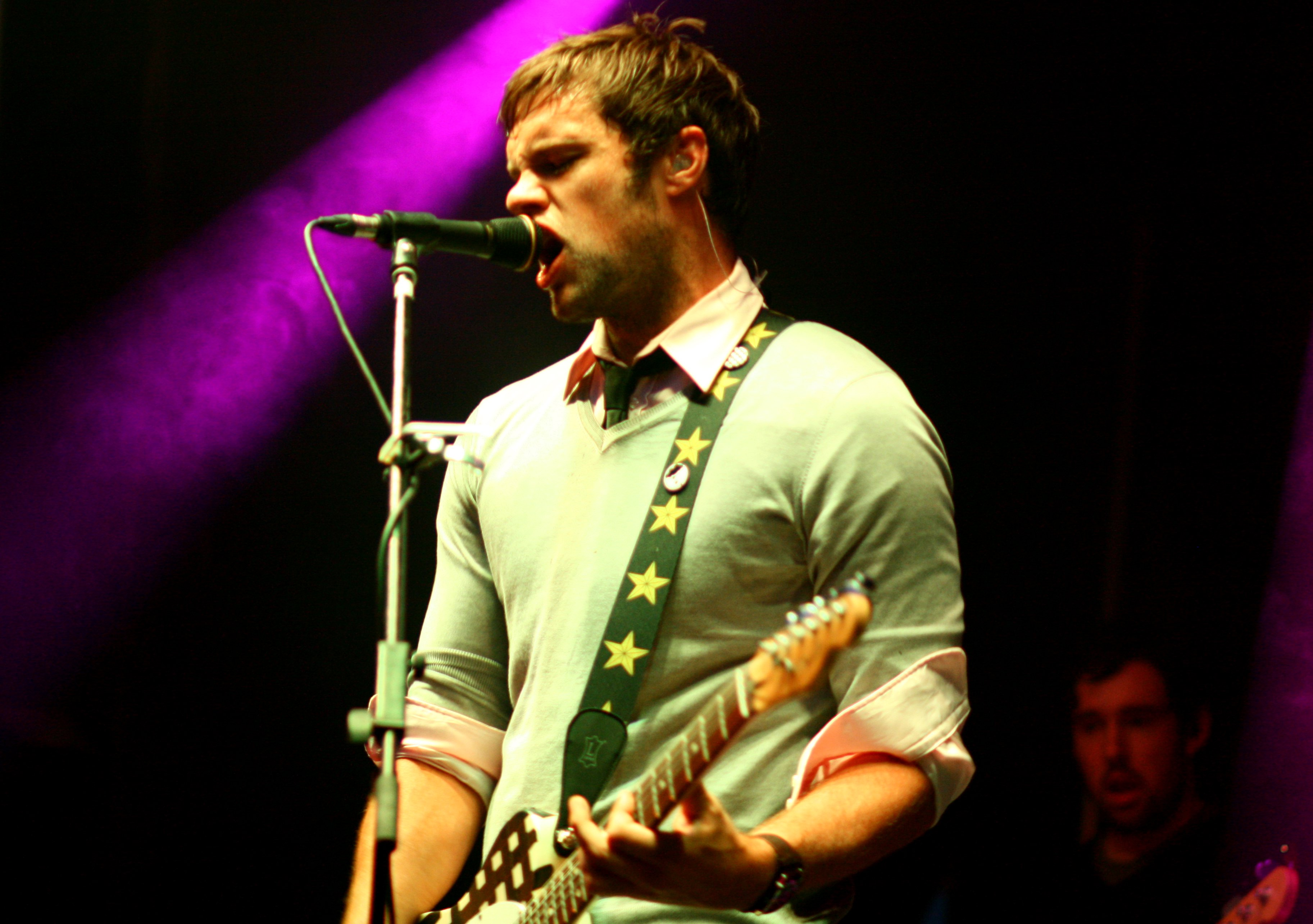
- Bressie with The Blizzards at Junction 7.08, June 2008

Background information
- Also known as: Bressie
- Born: Niall Breslin; 22 October 1980 (age 46); Blanchardstown, Dublin, Ireland
- Genres: Soft rock, pop
- Occupations: Singer-songwriter, television personality, former footballer
- Instruments: Guitar, drums, piano
- Label: Sony Music
- Website: bressiemusic.com

Rugby union career
- Position(s): Flanker, Second row
Senior career
Years	Team	Apps	(Points)
2002–2004	Leinster	14	(0)
- Correct as of 6 May 2015

Niall Breslin (born 22 October 1980), known as Bressie, is an Irish musician, former Westmeath Gaelic footballer and Leinster Rugby player. Breslin found success as the lead singer, guitarist, songwriter with pop band The Blizzards, as a co-writer and producer with XIX Entertainment and as a solo artist. He was the winning coach on the first, third and fifth seasons of The Voice of Ireland.

== Biography ==
=== Early life ===
Born on 22 October 1980 in Dublin, Ireland to father Enda, who was from Bundoran in County Donegal, and mother Mandy, Breslin is the second youngest of five children, including siblings Ronan, Laura, Julie and Andrea. At the age of two, he and his family moved to Mullingar, and attended Coláiste Mhuire in the town. As a result of Enda's military deployment when Breslin was 13, the family relocated to Israel for five months. Breslin attended University College Dublin on a sports scholarship, graduating with a Bachelor of Arts degree in Economics and Sociology (2003) and a master's degree in Mindfulness Based Interventions (2019). In 2022, Breslin was awarded UCD Alumnus of the Year in Social Sciences.

=== Sports career ===
Breslin represented Westmeath, in Gaelic football at minor, and U-21 Championship levels. He won a Leinster Under-21 Football Championship medal with Westmeath in 2000. He was also a professional rugby player with Leinster Rugby. He had a scholarship in UCD for rugby and also represented Ireland at Under-21 level in the World Cup.

=== Writing career ===
In 2015, Breslin published his first book Me and My Mate Jeffrey, a combination memoir/self-help book. "Jeffrey" is a personification of Breslin's anxiety disorder. The book won the 2015 Irish Book Award for popular non fiction.

=== Podcast ===
In July 2019, Breslin launched a podcast called Where Is My Mind? which focuses on mental health and wellbeing.

In April 2020, Breslin followed up his previous podcast with another series focusing on mental wellbeing and meditation, this time exclusively for Spotify, called Wake Up / Wind Down (UK & IE).

=== BBC Sounds ===
Since the 4th November 2025, Breslin has been hosting a programme on the online (BBC Sounds) and DAB+ radio channel 'BBC Radio 3 Unwind' titled Classical Wind Down, which is broadcast at least once a week, and focuses on playing calm music.

== Music career ==
=== The Blizzards ===
With childhood friends, Breslin formed The Blizzards in 2004. They released two albums that achieved commercial success, A Public Display of Affection in 2006 and Domino Effect in 2008. The band split up in 2009. Following the band's split, Breslin joined Simon Fuller's XIX Entertainment as a songwriter and producer in 2010.

=== Solo career ===
In 2011, Breslin released a solo album, Colourblind Stereo. Four singles were released from the album. During a performance at the Festival of Fires in Westmeath on 5 May 2012, he urged thousands of fans to vote against the government coalition of Fine Gael/Labour, saying before leaving the stage "I don’t normally do politics, but this Government is an awful bollocks. I want to make an appeal to all you people out there. Don't make the same mistakes we did by voting them in again".

In 2012, he was a coach on the inaugural season of The Voice of Ireland, mentoring the winner, Pat Byrne.

Through the end of 2012, Breslin began work on his second solo album "Rage and Romance". A music video was filmed for Show Me Love, featuring Moone Boy actors David Rawle and Ian O'Reilly. In 2014 Breslin appeared on the second series of Moone Boy as a PE Teacher.

In January 2014, Breslin announced putting his solo career as a recording artist on hold, with the intention to focus on his work as a judge on The Voice of Ireland and writing and producing music.

== Personal life ==
In late March 2013, Breslin opened up on his blog about his struggles with generalized anxiety disorder. Having experienced a severe panic attack on a live show taping during the first series of The Voice of Ireland, Breslin sought professional help and ultimately decided to manage his anxiety, by adopting a more active lifestyle. He began training for a triathlon, in support of Lakelands Area Retreat & Cancer Centre (LARCC), a foundation on which his mother serves as director.

Breslin is also an ambassador for Cycle Against Suicide (CAS), an organisation that seeks to raise awareness and bring support to those dealing with mental health issues. In April and May 2013, Breslin participated as a cyclist with CAS, in a series of legs around Ireland, stopping at local schools to give mental health-related talks and also he was dating Miss Universe Ireland 2010 Rozanna Purcell.

== Discography ==
=== Studio albums ===
Year	Album title	Peak chart positions
Year	Album title	IRE
2011	Colourblind Stereo: Released: 2011; Label: Sony Music; Formats: CD, digital download	8
2013	Rage and Romance: Released: 2013; Label: Sony Music; Formats: CD, digital download	1
2025	The Place That Has Never Been Wounded: Released: 2025; Label: Inni; Formats: CD, digital download	27

=== Singles ===
Year	Title	Peak chart positions	Album
Year	Title	IRE	Album
2011	"Can't Stay Young Forever"	9	Colourblind Stereo
2011	"Good Intentions"	36	Colourblind Stereo
2012	"Breaking My Fall"	14	Colourblind Stereo
2013	"Show Me Love"	53	Rage and Romance
2013	"Silence Is Your Saviour"	-	Rage and Romance

Guest appearances

- 2012 – "Rocky Road to Poland"
