= List of television game show franchises =

This is a list of television game shows that were franchised and adapted in different versions.

Name	Original name	Country of origin	Date started	Creator	First network to broadcast	First country to adapt	List of national variants
1 vs. 100	Eén tegen 100	Netherlands	September 3, 2000	Endemol	Nederland 2 (TROS)	Belgium (Flanders)	List
1-2-3	Un, dos, tres... responda otra vez	Spain	April 24, 1972	Chicho Ibáñez Serrador	La 1	United Kingdom	List
The 1% Club		United Kingdom	April 9, 2022	Dean Nabarro, Andy Auerbach	ITV	Netherlands	List
100%		United Kingdom	March 31, 1997	Tom Atkinson	Channel 5	France	List
1000 Heartbeats		United Kingdom	February 23, 2015	Paul Farrer	ITV	Philippines	List
101 Ways to Leave a Gameshow		United Kingdom	July 10, 2010	Endemol	BBC One	Turkey	List
20Q		United States	June 13, 2009	Endemol USA	GSN	Spain	List
30 Seconds to Fame		United States	July 17, 2002	Joe Revello, Michael Binkow	Fox	Brazil	List
5 Gold Rings	5 Golden Rings	Netherlands	January 12, 2017	Glenn Hugill, John de Mol	SBS6	United Kingdom	List
The 50	Les Cinquante	France	September 5, 2022	Banijay Productions	W9	United States	List
500 Questions		United States	May 20, 2015	Mark Burnett, Mike Darnell	ABC	Germany	List
The $64,000 Question		United States	June 7, 1955	Louis G. Cowan	CBS	Italy	List
99 to Beat	Homo Universalis	Belgium (Flanders)	January 23, 2018	VRT, Primitives, De Chinezen	VRT	Netherlands	List
The Almost Impossible Gameshow	Crash Games - Jeder Sturz zählt!	Germany	August 2. 2014	Endemol	ProSieben	United Kingdom	List
All Together Now		United Kingdom	January 27, 2018	Remarkable Entertainment	BBC One	Brazil	List
The Amazing Race		United States	September 5, 2001	Elise Doganieri, Bertram van Munster	CBS	Asia	List
Amnesia		United States	February 22, 2008	Mark Burnett	NBC	Australia	List
Anything Goes	Vendredi tout est permis avec Arthur	France	December 16, 2011	Satisfaction - The Television Agency	TF1	Portugal	List
The Apprentice		United States	January 4, 2004	Mark Burnett	NBC	Germany	List
Are You Smarter than a 5th Grader?		United States	February 27, 2007	Mark Burnett, Roy Bank, Barry Poznick, John Stevens	Fox	China	List
The Bachelor		United States	March 25, 2002	Mike Fleiss	ABC	United Kingdom	List
Bake Off	The Great British Bake Off	United Kingdom	August 17, 2010	Love Productions	BBC Two	Belgium	List
The Bar	Baren	Sweden	April 24, 2000	Strix	TV3 Sweden	Norway	List
Beat the Blondes		United States	October 2007	Eyeworks	CBS	Russia	List
Beat the Clock		United States	March 23, 1950	Mark Goodson, Bill Todman	CBS	United Kingdom	List
Beat the Star	Schlag den Raab	Germany	September 23, 2006	Stefan Raab	ProSieben	United Kingdom	List
Beauty and the Geek		United States	June 1, 2005	Ashton Kutcher, J.D. Roth	The WB	Finland	List
Bet on Your Baby		United States	April 13, 2013	Craig Armstrong, Rick Ringbakk, Charles Wachter, Ben Silverman, and Jimmy Fox	ABC	Turkey	List
The Better Sex		United States	July 18, 1977	Mark Goodson, Bill Todman	ABC	Australia	List
Big Brother		Netherlands	September 16, 1999	John de Mol	Talpa	Germany	List
The Biggest Loser		United States	October 19, 2004	Ben Silverman, Mark Koops, and Dave Broome	NBC	Brazil	List
Blind Date	The Dating Game	United States	December 20, 1965	Chuck Barris	ABC	Australia	List
Blockbusters		United States	October 27, 1980	Steve Ryan	NBC	United Kingdom	List
Boom!		Israel	April 3, 2014	Keshet	Channel 2	Spain	List
Bowling for Dollars		United States	1960s	Bert Claster	Syndication	Canada	List of stations that carried the program
The Brain	Deutschlands Superhirn	Germany	December 28, 2011	Endemol Shine Germany	ZDF	Italy	List
Brainiest	Britain's Brainiest	United Kingdom	August 9, 2001	David Briggs, Colman Hutchinson	ITV	Germany	List
BrainSurge	Brain Survivor	Japan	January 12, 2002	Scott A. Stone, Clay Newbill, and Tokyo Broadcasting System	TBS	United States	TBD
Bridge of Lies		United Kingdom	March 14, 2022	STV Studios	BBC One	Spain	List
Cannonball	Bommetje!	Netherlands	May 16, 2015	John de Mol	AVROTROS	United Kingdom	TBD
Cash Battle	Awantura o kasę	Poland	November 4, 2002	ATM Grupa	Polsat	New Zealand	List
Cash Cab		United Kingdom	June 13, 2005	Adam Wood, Mat Steiner, Les Dennis	ITV	Poland	List
Catch Phrase		United States	September 16, 1985	Steve Radosh	Syndication	United Kingdom	List
Celebrity Circus		Australia	May 8, 2005	Endemol	Nine Network	Portugal	List
Celebrity Name Game		United States	September 22, 2014	Coquette Productions	Syndication	Portugal	List
Celebrity Splash!	Sterren Springen Op Zaterdag	Netherlands	August 25, 2012	Eyeworks	SBS6	United Kingdom	List
Chain Reaction		United States	January 14, 1980	Bob Stewart	NBC	Canada (Quebec)	List
The Chair		New Zealand	January 15, 2002	Julie Christie, Darryl McEwen and Brian Bigg	ABC; TV2	United States	List
Chance of a Lifetime	The $1,000,000 Chance of a Lifetime	Australia	May 31, 1999	Stephen Leahy	Seven Network	Hungary	List
The Chase		United Kingdom	June 29, 2009	Danny Carvalho, Pete Faherty, Chris Gepp, Elliot Johnson, Matt Pritchard, Amanda Wilson	ITV	Germany	List
Child's Play		United States	September 20, 1982	Mark Goodson	CBS	United Kingdom	List
The Circle		United Kingdom	September 18, 2018	Tim Harcourt	Channel 4	United States	List
Clash of the Choirs		United States	December 17, 2007	Friday TV	NBC	Sweden	List
Clueless		Poland	April 13, 2005	ATM Grupa	Polsat	Greece	List
The Colour of Money		United Kingdom	February 21, 2009	Paul Brassey, Daniel Moody	ITV	Italy	List
Concentration		United States	August 25, 1958	Jack Barry, Dan Enright, Robert Noah, Buddy Piper	NBC	Australia	List
The Crystal Maze		United Kingdom	February 15, 1990	Jacques Antoine	Channel 4	United States	List
The Cube		United Kingdom	August 22, 2009	Adam Adler	ITV	Saudi Arabia	List
Dancing with the Stars	Strictly Come Dancing	United Kingdom	May 15, 2004	Fenia Vardanis, Richard Hopkins, Karen Smith	BBC One	Australia	List
Dating in the Dark	Daten In het Donker	Netherlands	April 6, 2009	ITV Studios Netherlands	RTL 5	Turkey	List
Deal or No Deal	Miljoenenjacht	Netherlands	December 22, 2002	John de Mol, Dick de Rijk	TROS	Australia	List
Deal with It	צא מזה	Israel	2010	Yigal Shilon, Itay Barkan	Channel 2	Germany	List
Dialing for Dollars		United States	1939 (as a radio program)	WCBM	WCBM (radio); WMAR-TV (television)	Canada	List of stations that carried the program
Dirty Rotten Cheater		United States	January 6, 2003	Jonathan Goodson	PAX TV	Italy	List
Distraction		United Kingdom	October 31, 2003	David Taylor	Channel 4	United States	List
Divided	De Gemene Deler	Netherlands	July 6, 2008	Aurélien Lipiansky, Clément Gayet	RTL 4	Hungary	List
Dog Eat Dog		United Kingdom	April 14, 2001	Howard Davidson, Sarah Edwards, Gail Sloan, Lynn Sutcliffe	BBC One	United States	List
Don't Forget the Lyrics!		United States	July 11, 2007	Jeff Apploff	Fox	Mexico	List
Double Dare		United States	October 6, 1986	Geoffrey Darby, Michael Klinghoffer, Dee LaDuke, Robert Mittenthal	Nickelodeon	Brazil	TBD
Drag Race	RuPaul's Drag Race	United States	February 2, 2009	RuPaul Charles, Fenton Bailey, Randy Barbato	Logo TV	Chile	List
Dragons' Den	Manē no Tora	Japan	October 6, 2001	Nippon TV	Nippon TV	United Kingdom	List
Duel	Le Quatrième Duel	United States	December 17, 2007	David Rosconval, Jean-Michel Salomon	ABC	United Kingdom	List
Every Second Counts		United States	September 17, 1984	Charles Colarusso	Syndication	United Kingdom	List
Ex on the Beach		United Kingdom	April 22, 2014	MTV UK	MTV UK	Sweden	List
The Face		United States	February 12, 2013	John de Mol Jr., Sebastiaan Spaan	Oxygen	United Kingdom	List
Family Feud		United States	July 12, 1976	Mark Goodson	ABC	Australia	List
The Farm	Farmen	Sweden	September 24, 2001	Strix	TV4	Norway	List
Farmer Wants a Wife		United Kingdom	November 8, 2001	Thames Television	ITV	Belgium	List
Fear Factor	Now or Neverland	Netherlands	August 31, 1998	John de Mol	Veronica TV	United States	List
Finders Keepers		United States	November 2, 1987	Geoffrey Darby, Bonni Grossberg, Michael Klinghoffer, Neil Krupnick, Dee LaDuke	Nickelodeon	Brazil	TBD
The Floor		Netherlands	January 8, 2023	John de Mol	RTL 4	Spain	List
Football's Next Star		United Kingdom	January 3, 2010	Initial Productions	Sky1	Ireland	List
Fort Boyard	Les Clés de Fort Boyard	France	July 7, 1990	Jacques Antoine, Jean-Pierre Mitrecey and Pierre Launay	Antenne 2	United Kingdom	List
Fun House		United States	September 5, 1988	Bob Synes	Syndication	United Kingdom	TBD
Game Night	Hollywood Game Night	United States	July 11, 2013	Sean Hayes, Todd Milliner	NBC	France	List
Game of Games	Ellen's Game of Games	United States	December 18, 2017	Kevin A. Leman II	NBC	Germany	List
Game of Talents	Adivina qué hago esta noche	Spain	May 13, 2019	Fremantle	Cuatro	Sweden	List
Gameshow Marathon		United Kingdom	September 17, 2005	ITV Studios, FremantleMedia	ITV	United States	List
Gladiators	American Gladiators	United States	September 9, 1989	Dan Carr, John Ferraro	Syndicated	United Kingdom	List
Got Talent	America’s Got Talent	United States	June 21, 2006	Simon Cowell	NBC	France	List
Got to Dance		United Kingdom	December 20, 2009	Shine TV, Princess Productions	Sky One	United States	List
Greed		United States	November 4, 1999	Dick Clark, Bob Boden	Fox	Brazil	List
Hell's Kitchen		United Kingdom	May 23, 2004	Gordon Ramsay	ITV	Germany	List
Hold on to Your Seat!	Tout le monde veut prendre sa place	France	July 3, 2006	Jean-Michel Salomon, Romain Cousi	France 2 TV5MONDE; La Deux; TV5 Québec Canada	United Kingdom	List
Hole In The Wall	Brain Wall	Japan	July 26, 2006	Takaaki Ishibashi, Noritake Kinashi	Fuji TV (as a component of The Tunnels' Thanks to Everyone)	South Korea	List
Hot Streak	Bruce Forsyth's Hot Streak	United States	January 6, 1986	Reg Grundy	ABC	Germany	List
I Can See Your Voice	너의 목소리가 보여	South Korea	February 26, 2015	Lee Seon-young	Mnet and tvN	Thailand	List
I Love My Country	Ik hou van Holland	Netherlands	March 8, 2008	Talpa Media	RTL 4	Czech Republic	List
I Survived a Japanese Game Show		United States	June 24, 2008	David Sidebotham, Karsten Bartholin	ABC	Greece	List
Identity		United States	December 18, 2006	Tim Puntillo	NBC	Italy	List
Idol	Pop Idol	United Kingdom	October 6, 2001	Simon Fuller	ITV	South Africa	List
In It to Win it		United Kingdom	May 18, 2002	Andrew Brereton, Sarah Edwards, Gail Sloan	BBC One	Netherlands	List
Iron Chef		Japan	October 10, 1993	Fuji Creative Corporation	FNS (Fuji TV)	United States	List
Jeopardy!		United States	March 30, 1964	Merv Griffin	NBC	Australia	List
Jeux sans frontières	Intervilles	France	July 17, 1962	Guy Lux, Claude Savarit	RTF	United Kingdom	List
Just the Two of Us		United Kingdom	February 23, 2006	Simon Cowell	BBC	Australia	List
Keynotes		Australia	March 2, 1964	Reg Grundy	Nine Network	United States	TBA
The Krypton Factor		United Kingdom	September 7, 1977	Jeremy Fox	ITV	United States	List
The Legacy	El Legado	Argentina	January 15, 2002	Marcelo Ferrero	Telefe	Italy	List
Lego Masters		United Kingdom	August 24, 2017	Tuesday's Child	Channel 4	Australia	List
Let's Make a Deal		United States	December 30, 1963	Stefan Hatos, Monty Hall	NBC	Peru	List
Lingo		United States	September 28, 1987	Ralph Andrews	Syndication	United Kingdom	List
Lose a Million		United Kingdom	September 22, 1993	Andrew O'Connor, Toby Freeman, Stephen Leahy	ITV	Spain	List
The Lyrics Board		Ireland	1992	Philip Kampff, Andy Ruane	RTÉ	Denmark	List
Man O Man		Germany	January 11, 1992	Frank Elstner	Sat.1	Australia	List
Masked Singer	King of Mask Singer	South Korea	April 15, 2015	Munhwa Broadcasting Corporation	MBC TV	China	List
MasterChef		United Kingdom	July 2, 1990	Franc Roddam	BBC One	United States	List
Mastermind		United Kingdom	September 11, 1972	Bill Wright	BBC1	New Zealand	List
Match Game		United States	December 31, 1962	Frank Wayne	NBC	Australia	List
May the Best Man Win	Everybody's Equal	United Kingdom	June 7, 1989	Chris Kwantes, Mitchell Symons	ITV	France	List
Mental Samurai		United States	March 19, 2019	Arthur Smith, Mike Darnell	Fox	Finland	List
Million Dollar Minute		Australia	September 16, 2013	Grant Rule & Riima Daher	Seven Network	New Zealand	List
Million Dollar Password		United States	June 1, 2008	Bob Stewart	CBS	Spain	List
Minute to Win It		United States	March 14, 2010	Friday TV	NBC	Brazil	List
The Mole	De Mol	Belgium	December 6, 1998	Michiel Devlieger, Bart De Pauw, Tom Lenaerts, Michel Vanhove	TV1	Netherlands	List
The Moment of Truth	しあわせ家族計画	Japan	April 30, 1997	TBS	TBS	Turkey	List
The Moment of Truth	Nada más que la verdad	Colombia	May 23, 2007	Howard Schultz	Canal Caracol	United Kingdom	List
The Money Drop	The Million Pound Drop Live	United Kingdom	May 24, 2010	Endemol	Channel 4	Russia	List
My Dad Is Better than Your Dad		United States	February 18, 2008	Mark Burnett	NBC	Finland	List
Name That Tune		United States	December 20, 1952	Harry Salter	NBC Radio	Australia	List
The Newlywed Game		United States	July 11, 1966	Nick Nicholson, E. Roger Muir	ABC	Australia	List
Next One!	Avanti un altro!	Italy	September 5, 2011	Paolo Bonolis, Stefano Santucci	Canale 5	Spain	List
Ninja Warrior	Sasuke	Japan	September 27, 1997	Masato Inui	JNN	United States	List
Now You See It		United States	April 1, 1974	Frank Wayne	CBS	United Kingdom (Scotland)	List
Numbers and Letters	Des chiffres et des lettres	France	September 19, 1965	Armand Jammot	Deuxième chaîne (couleur) de l'ORTF	Netherlands	List
Oblivious		United Kingdom	July 14, 2001	Mark Baker, Steve Havers	ITV	United States	List
Pasapalabra	The Alphabet Game	United Kingdom	August 5, 1996	Rebecca Thornhill, Mark Maxwell-Smith, Andrew O'Connor	BBC1	France	List
Password		United States	October 2, 1961	Bob Stewart	CBS	Australia	List
Peking Express		Belgium, Netherlands	March 14, 2004	Ludo Poppe	Net5, Play4, Q2	Germany	List
The People Versus		United Kingdom	August 13, 2000	David Briggs, Steven Knight, Mike Whitehill	ITV	Hong Kong	List
The People's Quiz		United Kingdom	March 24, 2007	Fever Media	BBC One	Spain	List
The Phone		Netherlands	July 6, 2007	Park Lane TV	AVRO (Nederland 3)	Russia	List
Pictionary		United States	September 12, 2022	Fox First Run, Bill's Market & Television Production, Mattel Television, CBS Media Ventures	Syndication	United Kingdom	List
Play Your Cards Right	Card Sharks	United States	April 24, 1978	Chester Feldman	NBC	Brazil	List
Pointless		United Kingdom	August 24, 2009	Pam Cavannagh	BBC	France	List
PokerFace		United Kingdom	July 10, 2006	Ant & Dec	ITV	Slovakia	List
Popstars		New Zealand	April 20, 1999	Jonathan Dowling, Bill Toepfer	TVNZ	Australia	List
Power of 10		United States	August 7, 2007	Michael Davies	CBS	Russia	List
Press Your Luck		United States	September 19, 1983	Bill Carruthers, Jan McCormack	CBS	Taiwan	List
The Price Is Right		United States	November 26, 1956	Bob Stewart	NBC	Australia	List
Project Runway		United States	December 1, 2004	Eli Holzman	Bravo	Norway	List
Pyramid		United States	March 26, 1973	Bob Stewart	CBS	United Kingdom	List
Queen for a Day		United States	April 30, 1945	John Masterson	Mutual Radio	Australia	List
Quiz Champion	Run for the Money	United States	June 6, 1987	Reg Grundy	ABC (Pilot)	United Kingdom	List
The Quiz with Balls	De Kwis Met Ballen	Netherlands	June 21, 2023	John de Mol	SBS6	United States	List
Quizmania		United Kingdom	August 12, 2005	Debbie King, Chuck Thomas, Simone Thorogood	Information TV, Life Showcase TV, ITV, ITV2, ITV Play, Men & Motors	Poland	List
Raid the Cage	כלוב הזהב (Kluv Hazahav)	Israel	January 4, 2013	Shy Barmeli, Ori Dror, United Studios of Israel Ltd.	Channel 2 (Keshet)	China	List
Ready Steady Cook		United Kingdom	October 24, 1994	Bazal Productions	BBC Two	United States	List
Red or Black?		United Kingdom	September 3, 2011	Simon Cowell	ITV	China	List
The Rich List		United States	November 1, 2006	Jim Cannon, Andy Culpin, Sam Pollard, David Young	Fox	Australia	List
Rising Star	HaKokhav HaBa	Israel	September 17, 2013	Asaf Spector Shenkar, Yoav Tzafir, Avi Nir	Channel 2 (Keshet)	Brazil	List
Rolling In It		United Kingdom	August 8, 2020	Over The Top Productions	ITV	Germany	List
Runaround		United States	September 9, 1972	Heatter-Quigley Productions	NBC	Netherlands	List
Sale of the Century		United States	September 29, 1969	Al Howard	NBC	Brazil	List
Shafted		United Kingdom	November 5, 2001	Initial	ITV	Australia	List
Shear Genius		United States	April 11, 2007	Reveille Productions	Bravo	Brazil	List
Show Me the Money	Tutto x Tutto	Italy	August 7, 2006	Dick de Rijk	Rai 1	United Kingdom	List
The Singing Bee		United States	July 10, 2007	Phil Gurin, Robert Horowitz	NBC	Australia	List
Singled Out		United States	June 5, 1995	Burt Wheeler, Sharon Sussman	MTV	Denmark	List
So You Think You Can Dance		United States	July 20, 2005	Simon Fuller, Nigel Lythgoe	Fox	Israel	List
Squares	Hollywood Squares	United States	October 17, 1966	Merrill Heatter, Bob Quigley	NBC	Australia	List
Star Academy	Starmaker	Netherlands	March 5, 2001	John de Mol Jr., Tim van Rongen	Yorin	France	List
Strike It Lucky	Strike It Rich	United States	September 15, 1986	Richard S. Kline	Syndication	United Kingdom	List
The Super Chase	Beat the Chasers	United Kingdom	April 27, 2020	Potato	ITV	Australia	List
Supermarket Sweep		United States	December 20, 1965	Al Howard	ABC	Argentina	List
Survivor	Expedition Robinson	Sweden	September 13, 1997	Charlie Parsons	SVT	Denmark	List
Switch		Belgium	June 27, 2016	Panenka	VRT	Germany	TBD
Take Me Out	Taken Out	Australia	September 1, 2008	FremantleMedia Australia	Network Ten	Denmark	List
Tell the Truth	To Tell the Truth	United States	December 18, 1956	Bob Stewart	CBS	United Kingdom	List
Temptation Island		United States	January 10, 2001	Andrew Perry, Mark L. Walberg, Catherine Chiarelli	Fox	Netherlands	List
That's Life		United States	November 29, 1979	Bob Stewart	ABC (Pilot)	Italy	TBD
Tic-Tac-Dough		United States	July 30, 1956	Jack Barry, Dan Enright	NBC	United Kingdom	List
Tipping Point		United Kingdom	July 2, 2012	Hugh Rycroft, Matthew Boulby, Richard Osman	ITV	Cyprus	List
Top Chef		United States	March 8, 2006	Magical Elves Productions	Bravo	Netherlands	List
Top Model	America's Next Top Model	United States	May 20, 2003	Tyra Banks	UPN (Now The CW)	Russia	List
Total Blackout		Denmark	February 28, 2011	Henrick Nielsen	Kanal 5	Norway	List
The Traitors	De Verraders	Netherlands	March 13, 2021	Marc Pos, Jasper Hoogendoorn	RTL 4	Belgium	List
Treasure Hunt	La Chasse aux trésors	France	March 15, 1981	Jacques Antoine	Antenne 2	Germany	List
TV Powww		United States	1978	Marvin Kempner	KABC-TV	Australia	List of stations that carried the program
Twenty-One		United States	September 12, 1956	Jack Barry, Dan Enright, Robert Noah	NBC	Germany	List
University Challenge	College Bowl	United States	October 10, 1953	Don Reid	NBC	United Kingdom	List
The Vault	הכספת	Israel	July 5, 2000	Erez Tal, Ruthi Nissan, Ori Gross	Channel 2	Greece	List
The Voice	The Voice of Holland	Netherlands	September 17, 2010	John de Mol, Ron van Velzen	RTL 4	United States	List
Waku Waku	Wakuwaku Dōbutsu Land	Japan	April 13, 1983	Kenichi Hirayama , Yukio Nagasaki, Masayasu Mori, Hideyuki Kakui	TBS Television	United States	List
The Wall		United States	December 19, 2016	Andrew Glassman, LeBron James, Maverick Carter	NBC	France	List
Wanna Bet?	Wetten, dass..?	Germany	February 14, 1981	Frank Elstner	ZDF	Netherlands	List
Weakest Link	The Weakest Link	United Kingdom	August 14, 2000	Fintan Coyle, Cathy Dunning	BBC Two	Australia	List
What? Where? When?	Что? Где? Когда?	Russia	September 4, 1975	Vladimir Voroshilov, Natalia Stetsenko	Soviet Central Television	Bulgaria	List
What's My Line?		United States	February 2, 1950	Mark Goodson, Bill Todman	CBS	United Kingdom	List
The Wheel		United Kingdom	November 28, 2020	Michael McIntyre	BBC One	Germany	List
Wheel of Fortune		United States	January 6, 1975	Merv Griffin	NBC	Belgium	List
Where in the World Is Carmen Sandiego?		United States	September 30, 1991	Howard Blumenthal, Dana Calderwood, Dorothy Curley	PBS	Italy	List
Who Wants to Be a Millionaire?		United Kingdom	September 4, 1998	David Briggs, Mike Whitehill, Steven Knight	ITV	Netherlands	List
Who's Still Standing?	La'uf al HaMillion	Israel	December 20, 2010	Lisa Shiloach-Uzrad, Amit Stretiner	Channel 10	Spain	List
The Whole 19 Yards		United States	March 2009	Endemol USA	CBS (Pilot)	Spain	List
Win, Lose or Draw		United States	September 7, 1987	Burt Reynolds, Bert Convy	NBC/Syndication	Canada (Quebec)	List
Win the Host's Money	Win Ben Stein's Money	United States	July 28, 1997	Al Burton, Donnie Brainard, Byron Glore, Andrew J. Golder	Comedy Central	United Kingdom	List
The Winner Is		Netherlands	January 26, 2012	John de Mol	SBS6	Germany	List
Winning Lines		United Kingdom	June 12, 1999	David Briggs, Steven Knight, Mike Whitehall	BBC One	United States	List
Wipeout		United States	September 12, 1988	Bob Fraser	Syndication	Chile	List
Wipeout		United States	June 24, 2008	Matt Kunitz, Scott Larsen	ABC	Turkey	List
The X Factor		United Kingdom	September 4, 2004	Simon Cowell	ITV	Australia	List
You Deserve It		United States	April 3, 2011	Dick de Rijk	ABC	Italy	List
Your Face Sounds Familiar	Tu cara me suena	Spain	September 28, 2011	Gestmusic	Antena 3	Turkey	List

== See also ==
- List of television show franchises
