= International versions of Minute to Win It =

International game show franchise

Minute to Win It is an international game show franchise where contestants take part in a series of 60-second challenges that use objects that are commonly available around the house. The first version of Minute to Win It to air was the American primetime game show, which premiered on NBC on March 14, 2010, and ran till 2011 with host Guy Fieri. It was revived in 2013 on GSN with host Apolo Ohno.

Currently over fifty countries worldwide have produced a version of Minute to Win It, as listed in table below.

== International versions ==
Country	Local name	Host	Broadcaster	Top Prize	Air Dates
Afghanistan	لحظه به لحظه; Lahza ba lahza	Qasim Ibrahimi	Tolo TV	Afs.1,000,000	June 7, 2013
Afghanistan	لحظه به لحظه; Lahza ba lahza	Mukhtar Lashkari	Tolo TV	Afs.1,000,000	June 7, 2013
Afghanistan	لحظه به لحظه; Lahza ba lahza	Pamir Kakar	Tolo TV	Afs.100,000	May 1, 2022
Afghanistan	هیت لحظه به لحظه; Hit Lahza ba lahza	Mustafa Azizi	Tolo TV	Afs.100,000	May 29, 2022
Afghanistan	هیت لحظه به لحظه; Hit Lahza ba lahza	Arash Sadri	Tolo TV	Afs.100,000	May 29, 2022
Albania	Kape Kohën	Gentian Hazizaj	Top Channel	?	October 7, 2012
Arab world	للزمن ثمن; Lezaman Thaman	Abdallah El Tuleihi	MBC 1	SR1,000,000	April 5, 2011
Argentina	Minuto para Ganar	Marley	Telefe	AR$1,000,000	July 17, 2011
Argentina	Minuto para Ganar	Marley	Telefe	AR$2,000,000	2022
Armenia	Հաղթեք Րոպեում; Haxteq Ropeum	Hovhannes Azoyan	Armenia TV	10,000,000֏	May 27, 2012
Australia	Minute to Win It	Darren McMullen	Seven Network	A$1,000,000	June 22 - August 24, 2010
Belgium	Binnen De Minuut (in Dutch)	Staf Coppens	vtm	€100,000	January 8, 2011 – January 4, 2012
Belgium	60 secondes chrono (in French)	Jean-Michel Zecca	RTL-TVI	€100,000	September 5, 2011
Brazil	Nada Além de um Minuto aired as a segment of Programa Silvio Santos	Silvio Santos	SBT	R$1,000,000	April 17, 2010 – June 17, 2018
Brazil	Nada Além de um Minuto aired as a segment of Programa Silvio Santos	Patricia Abravanel	SBT	R$300,000	September 18, 2022 – present
Cambodia	១នាទីដើម្បីឈ្នះ 1 Neati daembi chhneah	Neay Pekmey	CTN	40,000,000៛	January 19, 2014
Chile	Un minuto para ganar	Julián Elfenbein	TVN	CL$30,000,000	May 21, 2011
Chile	Minuto para ganar	Jean Philippe Cretton	Chilevisión	CL$20,000,000	March 24, 2022
China	争分夺秒; Zheng Fen Duo Miao	Chen Liqing and Yuan Chengjie	Dragon TV	¥100,000	September 18, 2013 _{(1st Season Finished)}
Colombia	Un minuto para ganar	Silvestre Dangond	Caracol TV	COL$300,000,000	November 1, 2010
Colombia	Minuto para ganar Kids	Sebastián Martínez	RCN Televisión		June 1, 2015 – July 21, 2015
Colombia	Minuto para ganar	Karoll Márquez	Citytv Bogotá	COL$20,000,000	September 15, 2014
Costa Rica	Un minuto para ganar	Mauricio Astorga	Teletica	₡25,000,000	March 8, 2011
Czech Republic	Máš minutu	Richard Genzer and Michal Suchánek	TV Prima	1,000,000Kč	April 10, 2011
Denmark	Det perfekte minut	Robert Hansen	TV2	250,000 kr.	August 17, 2011
Ecuador	Minuto Para Ganar	Yuly Maiocchi	Gama TV	US$50,000 (Regular episodes); US$10,000 (Celebrity specials)	August 7, 2011
Egypt; Lebanon	مينت تو وين إت - اتحدى الدقيقة; Ethada El Daqiqa	Wissam Breidy	Al-Nahar TV; MTV	US$150,000	May 1, 2014
Finland	Minuuttipeliä	Marko Keränen	MTV3	€30,000	March 21, 2011
France	60 secondes chrono	Alex Goude	M6	€100,000	July 12, 2012
Germany	Die perfekte Minute	Ulla Kock am Brink (Season 1-3)	Sat.1	€250,000	April 30, 2010
Germany	Die perfekte Minute	Thore Schölermann (Season 4-5)	Sat.1	€200,000	September 5, 2014
Germany	Die perfekte Minute	Ulla Kock am Brink (Season 6)	Sat.1	€25,000	March 13, 2023
Greece	Minute to win it	Dimitris Hungarezos	Mega TV	€50,000	March 3, 2012
Hong Kong	決戰一分鐘; Minute to Win It	Hacken Lee	TVB Jade	HK$1,000,000	November 25, 2012 – May 19, 2013
Hungary	1 perc és nyersz!	Balázs Sebestyén	RTL Klub	10,000,000 Ft.	February 27, 2012
Iceland	Minute to win it Ísland	Ingó Þórarinsson	SkjárEinn	Prizes worth 8,000,000 ISK	September 18, 2014
India	India's Minute To Win It	Gaurav Kapoor	AXN	₹1,00,00,000/-	January 12, 2011
India	Home Sweet Home (in Tamil)	Divyadarshini (D.D) and Deepak	Star Vijay	A home worth ₹20,00,000/-	March 4, 2011
India	60 Nodi! Are You Ready? (in Tamil)		Star Vijay	₹1,00,00,000/-	September 29, 2013
India	Super Minute (in Kannada)	Ganesh	ETV Kannada	₹10,00,000/-	August 30, 2014
India	Super Minute (in Kannada)	Ganesh	Colors Kannada	₹10,00,000/-	February, 2016
India	Minute To Win It (in Malayalam)	Nyla Usha	Mazhavil Manorama	₹10,00,000/-	April 9, 2016
Indonesia	Minute to Win It Indonesia	Andhika Pratama	MNCTV	Rp.100,000,000	July 17, 2017 – January 8, 2018
Israel	אליפות ישראל בדקה; Alifut Israel be Dakah	Ido Rosenblum	Channel 2 (Keshet)	₪1,000,000	October 26, 2011
Italy	Un Minuto per Vincere	Max Giusti (Season 1)	Rai Uno	€500,000	September 4, 2011
Italy	Un Minuto per Vincere	Nicola Savino (Season 2)	Rai Due	€500,000	November 22, 2012
Kazakhstan	Минута на победу Minuta na pobedu	Rinat Safargulov	NTK	1,000,000₸	May 19, 2012
Malaysia	Anda Ada 60 Saat (in Malay)	Ahmad Nabil	Astro Warna (New Episode); Astro Ria (Repeat)	RM500,000	December 25, 2010
Malaysia	Oru nimiṭam (in Tamil)	Anandha	Astro Vaanavil	RM500,000	December 2010
Mexico	Minuto para ganar VIP	Marco Antonio Regil	Canal de las Estrellas	MX$2,000,000	July 14, 2013
Mexico	Minuto para ganar VIP	Hector Sandarti	Canal de las Estrellas	MX$2,000,000	July 26, 2020
Mongolia	Бямба гарагийн саятан Byamba garageen sayatan	Shijir Baatar	MNB	₮1,000,000	2019
Myanmar	Minute to Win It	Phyo Zaw Linn	MRTV-4	Ks.10,00,000/-	2013
Myanmar	Minute to Win It	Hmu Thiha Thu	MRTV-4	Ks.10,00,000/-	2013
Netherlands	Minute to Win It	Gordon Heuckeroth	RTL 4	€100,000	January 8, 2011
New Zealand	Minute to Win It	Mike Hosking	TV ONE	NZ$1,000,000	2013
Norway	Vinn på minuttet	Carsten Skjelbreid	TV2	1,000,000 kr.	March 20, 2011
Paraguay	Minuto para ganar	Patty Orue and Carlitos Ortellado	Telefuturo	₲15,000,000	2020
Peru	Minuto para ganar	Johanna San Miguel (Season 1)	América Televisión	S/.100,000	January 15, 2011
Peru	Minuto para ganar	Magdyel Ugaz (Season 2)	América Televisión	S/.100,000	January 15, 2011
Peru	Minuto para ganar VIP	Mathias Brivio	América Televisión	S/.100,000	November 3, 2013
Philippines	Minute to Win It	Luis Manzano	ABS-CBN	₱1,000,000	January 14, 2013 – 2014 (Season 1)
Philippines	Junior Minute to Win It	Luis Manzano	ABS-CBN	₱500,000	April 29, 2013
Philippines	Minute to Win It: Last Man Standing	Luis Manzano	ABS-CBN	₱1,000,000	July 18, 2016 – May 5, 2017 (Season 2)
Philippines	Minute to Win It: Last Man Standing	Luis Manzano	ABS-CBN	₱2,000,000	January 7, 2019 (Season 3)
Philippines	Minute to Win It: Last Kid Standing	Luis Manzano	ABS-CBN	₱1,000,000	December 19, 2016
Philippines	Minute to Win It: Last Duo Standing	Luis Manzano	ABS-CBN	₱1,000,000	February 6, 2017
Poland	Milion w minutę	Marcin Prokop	TVN	1,000,000 zł.	September 5, 2011
Portugal	Ganha num Minuto	Marco Horácio	SIC	€20,000	January 8, 2012
Romania	Câștigi în 60 de secunde	Dan Negru	Antena 1	100,000 lei (Season 1); 50,000 lei (Season 2)	April 5, 2011
Serbia	Savršen minut	Srđan Karanović	Prva	1,000,000 din.	March 17, 2012
Singapore	Minute To Win It: Singapore	Bryan Wong	MediaCorp Channel 5	S$250,000	August 9, 2014
Slovenia	Minuta do zmage	Bojan Emeršič	POP TV	€100,000	March 18, 2011
South Korea	사소한 도전 60초; Sasohan Dojeon 60-cho	Oh Sang-jin	MBC	₩20,000,000	June 12 - August 7, 2011
Spain	Uno para ganar	Jesús Vázquez	Cuatro	€500,000	July 4, 2011
Sri Lanka	Home Game in 60 second	Niroshan Wijesinghe	Sirasa TV	Rs.10,00,000/-	October 26, 2010
Sweden	Minuten	Peter Settman (Season 1)	SVT	250,000 kr.	December 26, 2010
Sweden	Minuten	Malin Olsson (Season 2)	SVT	250,000 kr.	February 24, 2012
Thailand	Junior Minute to Win It Thailand	PK Piyawat Khempetch	Channel 3	฿1,000,000	July 6, 2013
Turkey	Kazanmak için 1 Dakika	Ertem Şener (Season 1)	Kanal D	₺500,000	January 6, 2012
Turkey	Kazanmak için 1 Dakika	Zuhal Topal (Season 2)	Kanal D	₺500,000	November 20, 2012
Ukraine	Хвилина для перемоги Khvylyna dlya peremohy	Maksim Averin	Ukrayina	₴500,000	October 16, 2011
United Kingdom	Minute to Win It	Darren McMullen	ITV2	£30,000	August 30, 2011
United States (original version)	Minute to Win It (in English)	Guy Fieri (2010)	NBC	US$1,000,000	March 14, 2010
United States (original version)	Minute to Win It (in English)	Apolo Ohno (2013)	GSN	US$250,000	June 25, 2013 (Sneak Peek: May 23, 2013)
United States (original version)	Minuto para ganar (in Spanish)	Marco Antonio Regil	MundoFox (Original); Telemundo (Repeat)	US$100,000	August 13, 2012 (Repeat: March 2020)
United States (original version)	Minuto para ganar (in Spanish)	Marco Antonio Regil	Estrella TV	US$100,000	May 6, 2024
Uruguay	Minuto para ganar	Álvaro Navia; Eunice Castro; Juanchi Hounie	Teledoce	UY$250,000	September 5, 2010
Venezuela	Un Minuto para ganar	Nelson Bustamante	Televen	Bs.100,000	July 12, 2012
Vietnam	Một phút để chiến thắng	Nguyên Vũ	HTV7	1,000,000,000₫	May 27, 2012

=== Rebroadcast of 2010-11 American version ===
Country	Broadcaster
Indonesia	MNCTV
Singapore	MediaCorp Channel 5

=== Unofficial versions ===
Country	Local name	Host	Broadcaster	Top Prize	Air Dates
China	分秒必争; Fēn miǎo bì zhēng	Bo Zai	GuiZhou TV	¥100,000	July 2010
China	挑战60秒; Tiǎo zhàn 60 miǎo	Bo Zai	GuiZhou TV	¥10,000	August 2, 2010
Mongolia	Нэг минут - нэг сая Neg minut - neg saya	Unknown	MNB	₮1,000,000	2014
Pakistan	Jeeto Ek Minute Mein	Faysal Quraishi	BOL Network	Rs2,000,000	2022
Russia	Минутное дело Minutnoe delo	Timur Rodriguez	Russia 1	1,000,000₽	November 17, 2012

== See also ==
- List of television game show franchises
