= Every Second Counts =

Every Second Counts can refer to:

- Every Second Counts (video parodies), a 2017 video parody meme mocking U.S. President Donald Trump
- Every Second Counts (UK game show)
- Every Second Counts (US game show)
- Every Second Counts (book), the autobiography of Lance Armstrong
- Every Second Counts (album), a 2006 album by the Plain White T's
- "Every Second Counts", a song by Chris Rea from Auberge
- "Every Second Counts", a song by White Town from Peek & Poke
