= Clash of the Choirs Vietnam =

Vietnamese reality talent contest

- Created by: Friday TV
- Presented by: Nguyên Khang
- Judges: Siu Black; Phương Thanh; Mỹ Lệ; Khánh Linh; Ngọc Anh; Đức Tuấn; Phan Đinh Tùng
- Country of origin: Vietnam
- Original language: Vietnamese
- No. of seasons: 1
- No. of episodes: 12

Production
- Production location: Ho Chi Minh City
- Running time: 2 hours
- Production companies: BHD Corp. Vietnam Television; Shine Group

Original release
- Network: VTV3
- Release: February 24 – May 11, 2012

Related
- Clash of the Choirs

Hợp ca tranh tài is a Vietnamese reality talent contest that made its debut on VTV3 in Vietnam on February 24, 2012. There were about twelve episodes scheduled to air.

The format was developed from an idea by Swedish singer and choir leader, Caroline af Ugglas and based on the US version.

The format was a multi-province "bragging rights" competition between about 15-person choirs assembled in the hometowns of the recording artists that support them. The choirs compete for a cash prize of 500 million VND. The prize is in the form of a contribution to a charity active in the artist's hometown.

The choirs were led by Siu Black, Mỹ Lệ, Đức Tuấn, Khánh Linh, Nguyễn Ngọc Anh, Phương Thanh and Phan Đinh Tùng.

== Teams and results ==
Celebrity	Hometown	Team's hometown charity	Finish
Phan Đinh Tùng	Ho Chi Minh City	Understanding the Heart	1st place
Mỹ Lệ	Huế	Tương Lai Specialized School for the Mentally Retarded	2nd place
Đức Tuấn	Long Xuyên	Khai Trí Elementary School	2nd place
Ngọc Anh	Quảng Ninh	Quảng Ninh Province's Disabled Children and Retirement Home	4th place
Khánh Linh	Hanoi	Rehabilitation and Training Center for the Blind	5th place
Siu Black	Buôn Ma Thuột	Bửu Thắng Disabled Children and Retirement Home	6th place
Phương Thanh	Thanh Hóa	Tế Thắng Elementary & Secondary School	7th place

== Song list ==
Each choir performed as part of a multi-choir medley format as well as songs for the finale night of the show. The choirs will be eliminated one by one until the final two choirs move to the finale.

Episode 1

1. 7 teams and their coaches - Tôi là người Việt Nam (Nguyễn Hải Phong)
2. Team Mỹ Lệ - Chuông gió (Võ Thiện Thanh)
3. Team Khánh Linh - Phố khuya (Giáng Son)
4. Team Siu Black - Ngẫu hứng sông Hồng (Trần Tiến)
5. Team Ngọc Anh - Bài hát cho anh (Đỗ Bảo)
6. Team Phan Đinh Tùng - You Raise Me Up by Secret Garden
7. Team Phương Thanh - Tôi đọc báo công cộng (Nguyễn Duy Hùng)
8. Team Đức Tuấn - Tiếng sông Cửu Long (Phạm Đình Chương)

Episode 2

1. Team Siu Black - Tìm lại (Microwave)
2. Team Mỹ Lệ - Taxi (Nguyễn Hải Phong)
3. Team Ngọc Anh - Tát nước đầu đình (Folksong)
4. Team Khánh Linh - Giận anh (Đức Trí)
5. Team Đức Tuấn - Bay (Nguyễn Hải Phong)
6. Team Phan Đinh Tùng - Lời yêu thương (Đức Huy)
7. Team Phương Thanh - Ngẫu hứng ngựa ô (Trần Tiến)

Episode 3

Eliminated: Team Phương Thanh

Episode 4

1. Team Khánh Linh - Chiếc Khăn Rơi (Doãn Nho)
2. Team Đức Tuấn - Tình Ca Phố-Phố Xa-Umbrella (Quốc Bảo-Lê Quốc Thắng-Rihanna)
3. Team Mỹ Lệ - Hò Giã Gạo (Folksong)
4. Team Phan Đinh Tùng - Vũ Điệu Hoang Giả (Ukrainian song)
5. Team Ngọc Anh - Stronger (What doesn't kill you) by Kelly Clarkson
6. Team Siu Black - Ngọn Lửa Cao Nguyên (Trần Tiến)

Episode 5

Eliminated: Team Siu Black

Episode 6

1. Team Đức Tuấn - The Phantom of The Opera (Andrew Lloyd Webber)
2. Team Ngọc Anh - Xuân Chiến Khu (Xuân Hồng)
3. Team Phan Đinh Tùng - Đường Cong (Nguyễn Hải Phong)
4. Team Khánh Linh - Quạt Giấy-Guốc Mộc (Lưu Thiên Hương)
5. Team Mỹ Lệ - Wavin' Flag by K'naan

Episode 7

Eliminated: Team Khánh Linh

Episode 8

1. Team Phan Đinh Tùng - Bang Bang (Phạm Duy)
2. Team Mỹ Lệ - Con cò (Lưu Hà Anh)
3. Team Ngọc Anh - Em yêu anh (Ngọc Bích)
4. Team Đức Tuấn - Đoàn Lữ Nhạc (Đỗ Nhuận)

Episode 9

Eliminated: Team Ngọc Anh

== Elimination order ==
Episode:		3	5	7	9	11	12
Place	Contestant	Result					
1	Phan Đ. Tùng			Btm2			
2	Đức Tuấn						
3	Mỹ Lệ		Btm2		Btm2		
4	Ngọc Anh				Elim		
5	Khánh Linh			Elim			
6	Siu Black	Btm2	Elim				
7	Phương Thanh	Elim					
