= Liang Patti =

Chinese American acrobat (born 1980)

Liang (born October 23, 1980, in Wuhan, China) is a Chinese American acrobat. She spent her childhood and teen years touring extensively worldwide with her hometown Chinese acrobatic troupe, Wuhan Acrobatic Troupe. She was awarded 2 gold medals for excellence in international acrobatic competition in Paris and her native China.

== Career ==
After moving to the United States in 1998, Liang began performing in her own one-woman show, Liang Acrobatic & Comedy Show. She toured the states with her on-stage partner Bill Patti as the MC and comedian.

Liang gained national exposure in 2000 when she was cast in a Justin Timberlake "N'SYNC" video. That video was shown on HBO as part of "N'SYNC'S live concert from New York's Madison Square Garden. Liang was also featured in 2003 on Fox TV's 30 Seconds to Fame, where she placed third in the competition. She was also asked to appear on the Jerry Lewis MDA Telethon, where she performed and was saluted as a young star of tomorrow in 2004. Liang has made guest appearances on the syndicated Daily Buzz TV show (2004), Sabado Gigante on Univision (2006) and on NBC's Today Show (2007).

Liang performed in the second season of NBC's America's Got Talent (2007). In episode 1, (June 12, 2007) she balanced eight spinning plates on bamboo sticks throughout her act while doing various acrobatic maneuvers, including splits and headstands. Piers Morgan buzzed her to see whether she would react, but she did not drop any plates during her performance. Judges Morgan, Sharon Osbourne and David Hasselhoff rewarded her with a trip to the Las Vegas Callbacks episode (7/10/07).

Today, Liang continues touring the U.S. performing in her one-woman show for a wide range of venues including colleges, corporations, festivals, casinos, and NBA/NCAA halftime shows.
