= International versions of Game of Talents =

Game of Talents is an international television game show franchise of Spanish origin, in which two teams of contestants compete to guess the hidden talent of a series of performers. The original Spanish version debuted on 13 May 2019 on Cuatro.

== International versions ==
Country	Name	Presenter(s)	Channel	Broadcast	Ref.
Belgium (Flanders)	Game of Talents	Julie Van den Steen and Tijl Beckand	VTM	18 February – 25 March 2021	
France	Game of Talents	Jarry (2021); Jean-Luc Reichmann (2022)	TF1	27 August 2021 – 30 July 2022	
Hungary	Tehetség első látásra	Bence Istenes	RTL	4 September – 20 November 2022	
Italy	Game of Talents	Alessandro Borghese	TV8	26 October – 30 November 2021	
Netherlands	Game of Talents	Julie Van den Steen and Tijl Beckand	RTL 4	23 July – 20 August 2021	
Philippines	Game of Talents	?	TV5	?	
Russia	Игра в талант	?	STS	TBA	
Spain (original format)	Adivina qué hago esta noche	Santi Millán	Cuatro	13 May 2019 – 17 September 2020	
Spain (original format)	Adivina qué hago	Santi Millán	Telecinco	20 April – 1 September 2024	
Sweden	Vem kan vad	Clara Henry	SVT	15 January – 5 March 2021	
United Kingdom	Game of Talents	Vernon Kay	ITV	10 April – 22 May 2021	
United States	Game of Talents	Wayne Brady	Fox	10 March – 25 May 2021	
Ukraine	Ігри талантів	Dzidzio	Ukraina	TBA	

== See also ==
- List of television game show franchises
