= Fear Factor (franchise) =

Dutch television game show format

- Created by: John de Mol Jr.
- Original work: Now or Neverland (The Netherlands)
- Owner: Banijay Entertainment
- Years: 1998–present

Fear Factor is a Dutch stunt/dare game show TV format that first aired in the Netherlands. The show was adapted from the original Dutch version Now or Neverland and renamed Fear Factor by NBC for the American market.

The show pits contestants against each other in a variety of three stunts for a grand prize.

== International versions ==
Currently airing franchise
Franchise with an upcoming season
Franchise that has an unknown status
Franchise that has suspended production
Franchise that has ended

Country	Name	Host(s)	Channel	Broadcast	Jackpot
Albania	Fear Factor		Vizion Plus		
Arab world	Fear Factor تحدى الخوف	Najla Badr & Ibrahim Abu Jawdeh	MBC1	February 13, 2004	50.000 SR
Argentina	Factor Miedo	David Kavlin	Telefe	2003	
Australia	Fear Factor Australia	Marc Yellin	Nine Network	2002	A$50.000
Belgium	Fear Factor	Walter Grootaers	VTM	2005	
Belgium	Fear Factor	Alex Agnew	Play 4	November 15, 2022	TBA
Brazil	Hipertensão	Zeca Camargo (2002); Glenda Kozlowski (2010–11)	Globo	April 14, 2002 – October 27, 2011	R$500,000
Bulgaria	Страх	Atanas Mihailov	Nova Television	2009–11	15.000 лв
Canada	Facteur de Risques	Benoit Gagnon, Josée Lavigueur	TVA	September 21, 2004	CAN$30,000
Canada	Fear Factor Célébrités	Patrick Huard	Crave	June 5, 2026	TBA
Chile	Fear Factor Chile	Tonka Tomicic	Canal 13	November 13, 2010	CL$3.000.000
Colombia	Frente al miedo	Juan Pablo Llano	Caracol TV	2005	
Croatia	Fear Factor	Antonija Blaće	RTL		
Czech Republic	Faktor strachu	Tomas Matonoha	Prima Cool	2009	
Denmark	Fear Factor	Biker-Jens	TV 3	2003	TBA
Denmark	Fear Factor	Ruben Søltoft	TV 2 Echo	December 20, 2025	TBA
Dominican Republic	Enfrentando al Miedo	Irving Alverti	Telesistema 11	December 12, 2006	RD$20.000.000
Egypt	Fear Factor Extreme أرض الخوف	Sally Chahin	Al Hayat TV	April 2009	US$50,000
Finland	Pelkokerroin	Aleksi Valavuori	Nelonen	September 13, 2008	€10,000
France	Fear Factor France	Denis Brogniart	TF1	2003–04	€10,000
Germany	Fear Factor	Sonja Zietlow	RTL	2004	
Greece	Fear Factor	Kostas Sommer	ANT1	June 2006	
Hungary	A Rettegés Foka	Kovalcsik Ildikó(Lilu)	RTL Klub	2005	5.000.000 Ft
India	Fear Factor India	Mukul Dev	SET Asia	10 March 2006	
India	Fear Factor: Khatron Ke Khiladi	Akshay Kumar (2008–09; 2011); Priyanka Chopra (2010); Rohit Shetty (2014-15, 2017-); Arjun Kapoor (2016)	Colors	July 21, 2008	
India	Fear Factor: Khatron Ke Khiladi - Made in India	Farah Khan; Rohit Shetty	Colors	August 1, 2020	
Indonesia	Fear Factor Indonesia	Agastya Kandau	RCTI	November 19, 2005	Rp.50.000.000
Italy	Fear Factor	Paolo Ruffini	GXT and Italia 2	October 2005 – June 2013	
Malaysia	Fear Factor Malaysia	Shamser Sidhu; Aaron Aziz (Astor Ria and Maya HD)	NTV7; Astro Ria; Astro Maya HD	August 27, 2005; February 15, 2014 (Upcoming season's): Astro Ria; Astro Maya HD	RM10.000; RM320,000 (Astro Ria and Maya HD)
Malaysia	Fear Factor Selebriti Malaysia	Aaron Aziz	Astro Ria and Astro Mustika HD	December 29, 2012	
Mexico	Fear Factor: Factor Miedo	Julio Bracho (2002–04) "El Rasta" (2004–05, 2010)	Televisa	2002, Fear Factor Vip 2010	MX$150.000
Netherlands	Now or Neverland	Fabienne de Vries	Veronica	1998	fl 20 000 €8 000
Netherlands	Fear Factor	Fabienne de Vries	Veronica / V8	2002-2004	
Norway	Fear Factor		TV 3	2002	
Pakistan	Madventures Pakistan	Ahsan Khan (2013); Ahmad Ali Butt (2015)	ARY Digital	2013 – present	
Philippines	Pinoy Fear Factor	Ryan Agoncillo	ABS-CBN	November 10, 2008 – February 20, 2009	P2.000.000
Poland	Fear Factor – Nieustraszeni	Roman Polko	Polsat	October 8, 2004 – December 3, 2004	50,000 zł
Portugal	Fear Factor – Desafio Total	Leonor Poeiras; José Carlos Araújo	Televisão Independente	2004	
Romania	Pariu cu Frica – Fear Factor		Sport.ro	April 6, 2008	
Russia	Фактор страха	Vladimir Turchinsky (2003–2004); Kirill Nabutov (2005); Anatoly Tsoy (2021)	NTV	2003–2005, 2021	100.000 ₽
Russia	Фактор страха	Alexey Chadov	STS	2023	300.000 ₽
South Africa	Fear Factor Africa	Colin Moss; Thapelo Mokoena; Lungile Radu	M-Net e.tv	2002; 2006–07	R300,000
Spain	Factor Miedo	Alonso Caparros	Antena 3	2005	
Sweden	Fear Factor Sweden	Paolo Roberto	TV3	2002	
Turkey	Fear Factor Türkiye	Acun Ilıcalı	Show TV	2006	TL 100.000
Turkey	Fear Factor Extreme	Asuman Krause	Star TV	2009	TL 100.000
Turkey	Fear Factor Extreme 2	Asuman Krause	Star TV	2010	TL 100.000
Turkey	Fear Factor Aksiyon	Asuman Krause	Fox Turkey	2013	TL 100.000
United Kingdom	Fear Factor UK	Ed Sanders	Sky1	Series 1: 3 September 2002 – 26 November 2002; Series 2: 18 September 2003 – 11 December 2003; Celebrity Series: 18 July 2004 – 22 August 2004	£20,000
United States	Fear Factor	Joe Rogan	NBC	June 11, 2001 – September 12, 2006	US$50,000
United States	Fear Factor	Joe Rogan	NBC	December 12, 2011 – July 16, 2012	US$50,000
United States	Fear Factor	Ludacris	MTV	May 30, 2017 – August 21, 2018	US$50,000
United States	Fear Factor: House of Fear	Johnny Knoxville	Fox	January 14, 2026	US$200,000

== See also ==
- List of television game show franchises
