= Debbie Bartlett =

American actress, dancer and choreographer

Debbie Bartlett (born 1951) is an American actress, dancer and choreographer, known for her work in film, television, and stage during the 1970s and 1980 particularly for her role on The Love Boat.

== Early life and family ==
Debbie Bartlett was born Deborah Ann DuBusky in 1951, the third of four children of Jerome Joseph “Jerry” DuBusky (1919 to 1984) and Ann Elizabeth Donahue (1927 to 1987). Her father was born in Washington D.C., with Prussian, French, Irish and Portuguese ancestry. Her mother was from Massachusetts with English and Irish ancestry.

Jerry and Ann DuBusky began raising their family in Washington DC before moving to California. The four children were raised in West Covina and attended Edgewood High School, where Debbie was crowned homecoming queen in 1969.

== Career ==
Debbie DuBusky began her career in 1970 when she joined the cast of Disney on Parade. It was on that tour that she met Bill Bartlett whom she married the next year, taking the name Bartlett as her stage name. The Disney on Parade show and tour took her to Canada, Mexico and around the USA. At the end of the tour she joined the Chandler Conspiracy Night Club Act, a touring show group, where she performed alongside Bill until 1974. Alongside her husband she appeared in an Orange Shasta commercial in 1977 starring Barry Williams and choreographed by Peter Gennaro. She began her film career in 1978 in the comedy Shame, Shame on the Bixby Boys, where she played Suley Blue Bixby, but continued to work on stage. In 1979 she performed alongside Peter Virgo jr and Bruce Tuthill in Bells Are Ringing at The Muny, St Louis playing Michelle.

In 1980, Bartlett was cast in Xanadu as one of the immortal Muses. She was the second muse to emerge from the mural during the "I'm Alive" sequence. However, she had to leave the production before its conclusion and was uncredited. In 1981, she made a guest appearance on the sitcom Three's Company as Marlene in the episode Some of That Jazz. Debbie then became well known as a game show cohost. In 1983 she was featured on Dream House and then filled the cohost role on Every Second Counts in 1984.

Bartlett's most significant television role came in the final season of The Love Boat (1985–1986), where she appeared in 19 episodes as Susie, one of eight dancers known as The Mermaids. Selected through a nationwide audition process from thousands of hopefuls, she was part of a team that included Teri Hatcher, who appeared as Amy in her first role. For this role she had to leave Every Second Counts midway through its run.

From June 1986 to June 1987, Bartlett performed in the touring production of Singin' in the Rain, playing Mary Margaret and participating in the ensemble. She then returned to TV to act as a gameshow cohost with Alan Thicke in Animal Crack-Ups (1987–1990). She also worked as a hostess on the short-lived syndicated series Home Shopping Game in 1987.

In the 1990s, Bartlett worked alongside her husband as a choreographer. In 1995, they choreographed F. Scott Fitzgerald's Tender is the Night at the Fountain Theatre, Los Angeles In 1998, at The Fountain Theatre once again, they choreographed Fitzgerald's The Last Tycoon for which they won the LA Weekly 1998 Production Design of the Year Award for Choreography. Other notable productions at the Fountain Theatre include Dottie! and Ancient History.

Bartlett continued to perform as well as choreograph. Although predominantly in theatre, in 2003 she played a ghost dancer alongside Bill in the Disney film The Haunted Mansion.

== Personal life ==
Debbie married William "Bill" Bartlett (1940–2024), a dancer and dance teacher, on August 3, 1971. She used her married name throughout her career. Bill had already begun establishing his career as a performer in Portland, Oregon.

Debbie assisted Bill's teaching from around 2007 at Idyllwild and began to take classes of her own. They were also close friends with dancer and choreographer Alex Romero and dancer and author Mark Knowles. They assisted Knowles in creating a lecture on the history of tap dancing, which Knowles later expanded into a book. When Bill Bartlett died on August 31, 2020, they had been married for forty-nine years. Latterly, the Bartlett's performed together in Hollywood in show written and directed by Cate Caplin (a former student of Bill's) called The Beat Goes On. Her final performance with Bill was in 2017 at the Debbie Reynolds and Carrie Fisher Celebration of Life at the Forest Lawn Hall of Liberty.
