= Rob Fruithof =

Dutch actor and presenter (1951–2023)

- Born: 4 October 1951; Bussum, Netherlands
- Died: 25 August 2023 (aged 71); Cape Town, South Africa
- Education: Maastricht Academy of Dramatic Arts
- Years active: 1977–2004
- Children: 1

Rob Fruithof (4 October 1951 – 25 August 2023) was a Dutch actor and broadcaster. He was best known for presenting Waku Waku, the Dutch version of Animal Crack-Ups.

== Early years ==
Fruithof studied at the Maastricht Academy of Dramatic Arts. After graduating in 1975 he joined the theater group Theater in Arnhem.

Fruithof played in several theater plays such as Tafel van Tien by Alan Ayckbourn and Gedeelde liefde, halve liefde with André van den Heuvel and Kitty Janssen, and he managed to get Willeke van Ammelrooy for the play Hello and Goodbye by Athol Fugard. He had several minor roles in television series such as Nieuwe Buren and Dagboek van een herdershond. He played the lead in the TROS series Lessen in liefde.

== Career ==
Fruithof gained national fame as presenter of the weekly KRO program Waku Waku from 1988 until 1996, the Dutch version of Animal Crack-Ups. In 1993, Fruithof also presented the KRO program Made in Holland. In 1996, he switched to the TROS where he presented the program Te land, ter zee en in de lucht.

In 1990, Fruithof and his girlfriend Janke Dekker were part of the musical Up on the Roof, and he was the Dutch voice of Beast in the 1991 film Beauty and the Beast.

Fruithof played Raymond de Haas in a few episodes of the television series Westenwind. In 2003 and 2004 he played Kees de Boei in the soap Onderweg naar Morgen.

== Later years ==
Fruithof had friends in Cape Town, South Africa where he regularly spent his vacations. In 2004, Fruithof moved to Bloubergstrand, South Africa with his then wife and son. Even after retiring he continued doing minor roles in commercials and movies. Fruithof had minor roles in the 2011 movie Sniper: Reloaded as a Belgian plantation owner, and in 2016 in the third season of Black Sails as captain of a slaveship.

== Personal life and death ==
Fruithof had a relationship with actress Janke Dekker for several years. From a later relationship he had a son.

Rob Fruithof died from cancer in Cape Town on 25 August 2023, at the age of 71.
