= Greed (franchise) =

Game show franchise

Greed is a game show that originally aired in the United States on Fox in 1999. Developed by Dick Clark in response to ABC's Who Wants to Be a Millionaire?, it featured five contestants (including one team captain) who answered multiple choice questions in a bid to climb the Tower of Greed and win the two million dollar jackpot. Despite an initial cancellation after only one season, it was later picked up by Game Show Network, and its eventual success in the U.S. led to it becoming a worldwide franchise as the show was adapted and recreated in several other countries.

These international versions featured different music (the British version added extra sound effects in its title sequence), composed by British composer Graham Ness, and graphics set around a safe and a tower of gold bars. However, the gameplay was largely the same as the U.S. original, aside from the Australian version, which featured a progressive jackpot. The standard international set was designed by British production designer Andy Walmsley.

== International versions ==
All the international versions were produced by Pearson Television (now Fremantle).

Country	Name	Presenter(s)	Channel	Broadcast	Top Prize	Ref.
Arab World	Greed: يا قاتل يا مقتول; Greed: Ya Qatel ya Maqtoul	Marcel Ghanem	LBC	2001−2002	US$1,000,000	
Argentina	Codicia	Eduardo de la Puente	El Trece	2001	500,000 AR$	
Argentina	Audacia	Eduardo de la Puente	El Trece	2001	500,000 AR$	
Australia	Greed	Kerri-Anne Kennerley	Channel Ten	February 11 − April 29, 2001	A$1,000,000 + progressive jackpot	
Brazil	Audácia (segment of Programa Silvio Santos)	Sílvio Santos	SBT	2000	R$10.000.000	
Chile	Audacia	Mario Kreutzberger	Canal 13	2001	$1,000,000,000	
Denmark	Grisk - når det gælder	Thomas Mygind (2001); Alex Nyborg Madsen (2001–2002)	TV3	2001–2002	kr.2,000,000	
Finland	Gr€€d	Petteri Ahomaa	MTV3	October 13, 2000 – August 15, 2003	mk 1,000,000 €170,000	
France	Mission 1 million	Alexandre Delpérier	M6	November 27 – December 8, 2000	1,000,000 FF	
Germany	Ca$h—Das eine Million Mark-Quiz	Ulla Kock am Brink	ZDF	November 21, 2000 – November 13, 2001	1,000,000 DM	
Israel	הפיתוי; Ha-Pituy	Avri Gilad	Channel 2	October 3, 2000 – 2001	₪2,200,000	
Italy	Gr€€d	Luca Barbareschi	Raidue	September 18, 2000 – April 6, 2001	₤1,000,000,000	
Mexico	Audacia, La Fiebre Del Dinero	Marco Antonio Regil	Televisa	December 30, 2000 – January 1, 2002	MXN$1,000,000,000	
Poland	Chciwość, czyli żądza pieniądza	Mirosław Siedler	Polsat	2001	1,000,000 zł	
Portugal	A Febre do Dinheiro	Carlos Cruz	SIC	September 2000 – 2001	100,000,000 $	
Russia	Алчность; Alchnost	Alfred Koch; Igor Jankowski; Alexander Tsekalo	NTV	September 10, 2001 – April 30, 2002	2,000,000 руб	
South Africa	Greed	Revin John	SABC3	October 12, 2000	R2,000,000	
Spain	Audacia	Jordi Estadella	TVE1	October 19, 2000 – 2001	100,000,000 ₧	
Sweden	Vinna eller försvinna	Fredrik Belfrage	SVT	2001	1,000,000 kr	
Turkey	Aslan Payı	Mehmet Aslantuğ	aTV	September 2000	1,000,000,000,000 TL	
United Kingdom	Gr££d	Jerry Springer	Channel 5	May 18 – June 9, 2001	£1,000,000	
United States (original format)	Greed	Chuck Woolery	Fox	November 4, 1999 – July 14, 2000	US$2,000,000	
Venezuela	La fiebre del dinero	Fausto Malavé	Venevisión	May 25, 2001	100,000,000 Bs.	

== See also ==
- List of television game show franchises
