= Bill Rafferty =

American television personality (1944–2012)

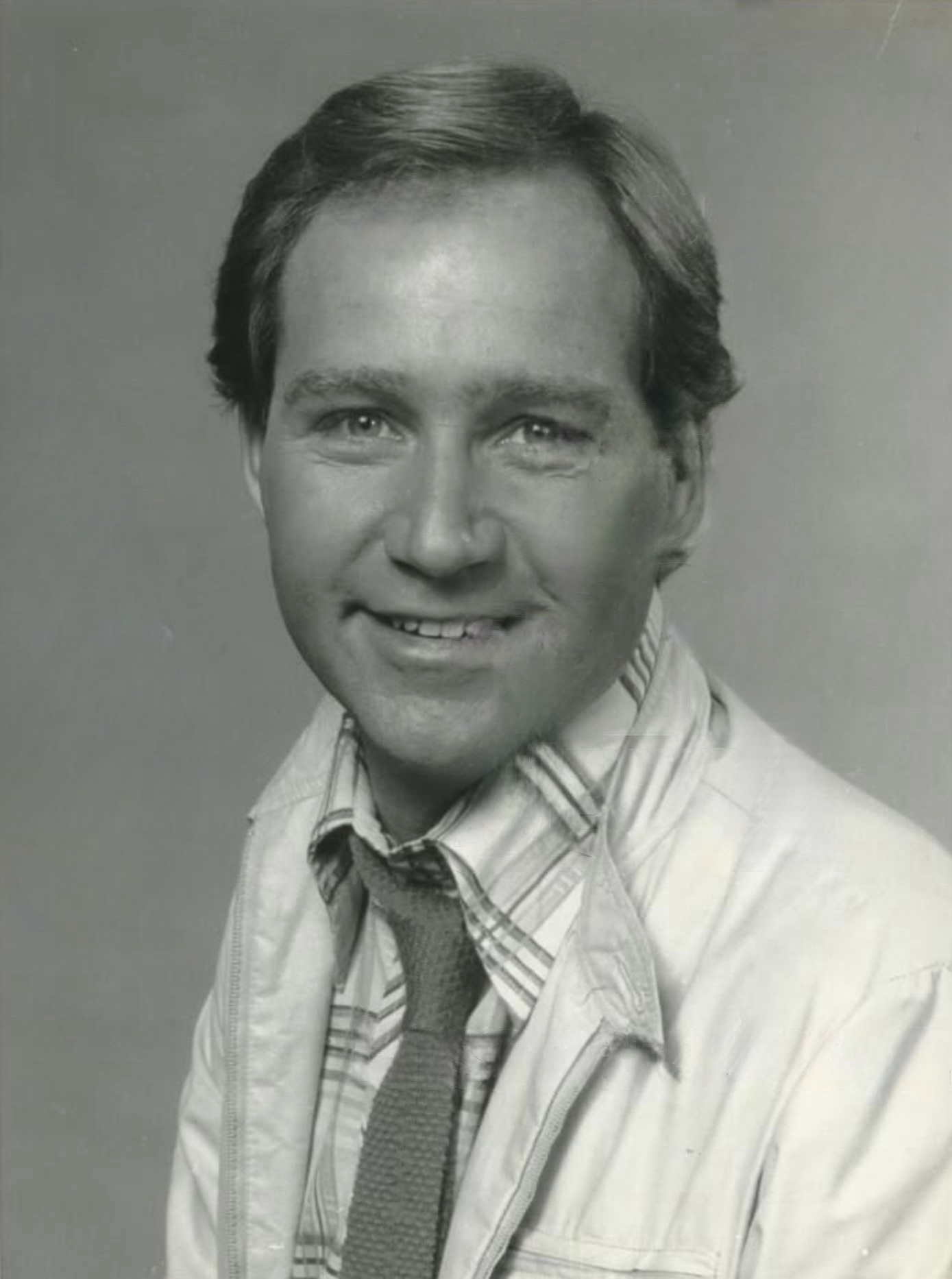
- Rafferty in Real People, 1981
- Born: William Rafferty; June 17, 1944; Queens, New York, U.S.
- Died: August 11, 2012 (aged 68); San Rafael, California, U.S.
- Other name: Bill Raftery
- Occupations: Comedian, game show host
- Years active: 1977–2012
- Television: Laugh In (1977–78); Real People (1979–84); Every Second Counts (1984–85); Card Sharks (1986–87; nighttime); Blockbusters (1987)
- Spouse: Regina Miletic (m. 1968)
- Children: 3

William Rafferty (June 17, 1944 – August 11, 2012) was an American comedian and game show host. He hosted Every Second Counts (1984–1985, syndicated), Card Sharks (1986–87, syndication), and Blockbusters (1987, NBC).

== Early life ==
Rafferty was born in Queens, New York. He was the fourth and youngest child of Henry Rafferty, Sr., and Martha (Degnan) Rafferty.

== Career ==
Before his career in television, Rafferty was a military policeman in the United States Army. He was also a butcher in Bolinas, California.

His first national TV exposure was as a co-host on the NBC reality series Real People, which ran from 1979 to 1984. Originally, he was one of the five in-studio co-hosts before becoming a field correspondent ("roving reporter"), though he still made occasional studio appearances.

Rafferty also made guest appearances on episodes of Laugh-In in the late 1970s version of the show. Rafferty was the host of a television show on Retirement Living TV, called Retired and Wired, which debuted in October 2007.

== Personal life ==
Rafferty married Regina Miletic on May 25, 1968, in Queens, New York and they had three children together. Rafferty died from congestive heart failure on the morning of August 11, 2012.

== Filmography ==
=== Film ===
Year	Title	Role	Notes
1994	Above the Rim	Self	Documentary
1997	Mad City	Bill Gottsegen	
2010	The Prankster	Presenter	

=== Television ===
Year	Title	Role	Notes
1977	The Great American Laugh-Off	Self	Television special
1977–1978	Rowan & Martin's Laugh-In	Regular Performer	6 episodes
1980	Mating and Dating in the '80s	Self (Host)	Television film
1981	Texas	Himself	Episode #1.240
1987	Mickey Spillane's Mike Hammer	Dean Bridges	Episode: "Green Lipstick"
1998, 1999	Nash Bridges	Eliot Brighton / Kenneth	2 episodes
