= Minute To Win It: Singapore =

Singaporean game show

- Created by: Friday TV
- Presented by: Bryan Wong
- Country of origin: Singapore
- No. of seasons: 1
- No. of episodes: 13

Production
- Executive producers: Jennifer Gwee; Alvin Ong
- Running time: 48 minutes without commercials (60 minutes with commercials)
- Production companies: Shine America; MediaCorp Studios Singapore

Original release
- Network: MediaCorp Channel 5
- Release: August 9, 2014 – November 5, 2014

Minute to Win It: Singapore Edition is a Singaporean primetime game show that originally ran on MediaCorp Channel 5 with host Bryan Wong. The show is part of an international franchise, Minute to Win It. Contestants take part in a series of 60-second challenges that use objects that are commonly available around the house. Contestants who managed to complete all 10 challenges will win S$250,000. The first episode premiered on Saturday (August 9, 2014), 8:20pm, right after the live telecast of the nation's 49th National Day Parade. Subsequent episodes were telecast on every Wednesday beginning from 13 August 2014 at 8:00pm.

The show sponsors are: Pokka, Wrigley's Eclipse Mints, Hershey's, Burger King and ASA Holidays.

== Gameplay ==
=== Rules ===
The contestant is presented with the blueprint for the first game (level) and must successfully complete a game within 60 seconds to win the first level (was $1,000 in all versions) and advance to the next level. After successfully completing the fourth and seventh level games, the contestant is guaranteed to leave with no less than the cash award for those levels. If the contestant can complete the final game, the contestant will earn $250,000.

The difficulty of the games progressively increase throughout the show. If time expires or the conditions of the game cannot be fulfilled (such as by the contestant exhausting any allotted attempts or committing a foul), the contestant loses a "life". If the contestant loses all three of their "lives", the game ends and the contestant's winnings drop to the previous milestone they passed.

After successfully completing a game, the contestant can leave with the amount of money already won before seeing the blueprint for the next game. However, once the contestant elects for the game, the contestant cannot leave the show until that game is complete or they have exhausted all three of their "lives".

In episodes featuring teams of two contestants, some games are played by both players, while others are played solo. A player can only make three consecutive attempts at solo games (including re-attempts following losing a life; an intervening team game does not reset this count). After a player makes three attempts, the other player is forced to attempt the next solo game.

=== Prizes ===
Successfully completing a challenge is worth a specific cash prize at each level. Contestants who successfully complete challenge on levels with bolded amounts in the table below are guaranteed to leave with no less than the cash award at that level should they fail any later challenge.

Level	Value (Normal Version)	Value (Celebrity Version)
1	$1,000	$1,000
2	$2,000	$2,000
3	$3,000	**$3,000**
4	**$5,000**	$5,000
5	$10,000	**$10,000**
6	$15,000	$15,000
7	**$25,000**	**$25,000**
8	$50,000	$50,000
9	$100,000	$100,000
10	**$250,000**	**$250,000**

Level 3, 5 and 7 are the safety levels for the celebrities who are playing for their charities.

== Episode Summary/Statistics ==
Episode	Date	Contestants	Final challenge	Total Prize Won
1	August 9, 2014	Joseph, Charlotte, Reuben & Fabian (JT & 8 - The Kwok Family)	This Blows - Level 4 (Failed)	$0
1	August 9, 2014	Fadzli & Mingzuo (Team 180)	Tea Party - Level 4 (To Continue in Episode 2)	-
Challenges Played: JT & 8 - Floatacious, Give It A Whirl, A Bit Dicey, This Blows; Team 180 - Tilt-A-Cup, Extreme Hanky Panky, Magic Carpet Ride, Tea Party
2	August 13, 2014	**Fadzli & Mingzuo** (Team 180)	Back Flip - Level 7 (Failed)	$5,000
2	August 13, 2014	Jonathan & Gary (Kin Warriors)	Johnny Applestack - Level 4 (Failed)	$0
Challenges Played: Team 180 - Office Tennis, Ka-Broom, Back Flip; Kin Warriors - Nervous Nelly, Speed Eraser, Ready Spaghetti, Johnny Applestack
3	August 20, 2014	**Enna & Malvin** (Enna and The King)	Frankenstein - Level 8 (Failed)	$25,000
Challenges Played: Enna and The King - Human Burrito, Give It A Whirl, Office Dominoes, Ker Plink! Or Plunk!, Sharpshooter, Bridge The Gap, The Nutstacker, Frankenstein
4	August 27, 2014	**Rebecca Lim, Pierre Png & Daren Tan** (Mata Mata 2: The New Era Charity Special)^{1}	Egg Roll - Level 7 (Failed)	$10,000
Challenges Played: Mata Mata 2 - Nervous Nelly, Noodling Around, Suck It Up, Sharp Shooter, Stack Attack, Field Goal, Egg Roll
5	3 September 2014	**Hussain** (The Allied Educator)	CD Dominoes - Level 6 (Failed)	$5,000
5	3 September 2014	Hanafiah & Yasin (The Footy Boys)	Puddle Jumper - Level 2 (To Continue in Episode 6)	-
Challenges Played: The Allied Educator - Baby Rattle, Ker Plink! Or Plunk!, Bottoms Up, Sharp Shooter, Spudnick, CD Dominoes; The Footy Boys - Nervous Nelly, Puddle Jumper
6	10 September 2014	**Hanafiah & Yasin** (The Footy Boys)	Got Your Back - Level 5 (Exited the Game)	$10,000
6	10 September 2014	Abram, Del, Cheryl, Calvin (The Incredibles)	Ready Spaghetti - Level 3 (Failed)	$0
Challenges Played: The Footy Boys - Kick Off, Spudnick, Got Your Back; The Incredibles - Human Burrito, Nose Dive, Ready Spaghetti
7	17 September 2014	**Norman & Samantha**	Walrus - Level 5 (Failed)	$5,000
7	17 September 2014	Adam & Jin Wei	Rapid Fire - Level 2 (To continue in Episode 8)	-
Challenges Played: Norman & Samantha - Candelier, Hanky Panky, A Bit Dicey, Got Your Back, Walrus; Adam & Jin Wei - Bobblehead, Rapid Fire
8	24 September 2014	**Adam & Jin Wei**	Level 5 - Sticker Picker Upper (Exited the Game)	$10,000
8	24 September 2014	**Parmes**	Level 5 - Egg Tower (Failed)	$5,000
Challenges Played: Adam & Jin Wei - Hang Over, Tipsy, Sticker Picker Upper; Parmes - Speed Eraser, Tilt-A-Cup, Flying Gumball Saucers, Tea Party, Egg Tower
9	1 October 2014	**Tun Zen**	Splitter - Level 6 (Failed)	$5,000
9	1 October 2014	Raizal	Nimble Thimble - Level 4 (To continue in Episode 10)	-
Challenges Played: Tun Zen - Baby Rattle, Suck It Up, Flying Gumball Saucers, Magic Carpet Ride, Triple Pong Plop, Splitter; Raizal - Floatacious, Sticky Balls, Stay On Key, Nimble Thimble
10	8 October 2014	**Raizal**	Tuna Roll - Level 6 (Exited the Game)	$15,000
10	8 October 2014	**Kamal, Noor, Mira & Nadz**	Cyclone - Level 7 (Failed)	$5,000
Challenges Played: Raizal - High Strung, Tuna Roll, (Cyclone^{3}); Kamal, Noor, Mira & Nadz - Tilt-A-Cup, Sticky Balls, Junk In the Trunk, Puddle Jumper, Stack Attack, Caddy Stack, Cyclone
11	15 October 2014	**Minister Tan Chuan-Jin & Gurmit Singh**^{1}	Ping Tac Toe - Level 9 (Exited the Game)	$100,000
Challenges Played: Minister Tan Chuan-Jin & Gurmit Singh - Tilt-A-Cup, Give It A Whirl, Office Dominoes, Bouncer, Ker Plink! Or Plunk!, This Blows, Back Flip^{2}, Broomski Ball, Ping Tac Toe
12	29 October 2014	**George**	Dangerous Curves - Level 6 (Exited the Game)	$15,000
12	29 October 2014	**Hidayat & Tajmal**	High Strung - Level 3 (Exited the Game)	$3,000
Challenges Played: George - Floatacious, Sticky Balls, Office Dominoes, Nimble Thimble, Stack Attack, Dangerous Curves; Hidayat & Tajmal - Human Burrito, Nose Dive, High Strung
13	5 November 2014	**Chua En Lai, Alaric Tay, A B Shaik & Dalina Jaapar**^{1}	Speed Eraser - Level 6 (Failed)	$10,000
Challenges Played: Chua En Lai, Alaric Tay, A B Shaik & Dalina Jaapar - Bobblehead, Tilt-A-Cup, Magic Carpet Ride, Ready Spaghetti, Shoe Fly Shoe, Speed Eraser

^1 These players played for charity.
^2 Host Bryan Wong played this game, just for charity reasons.
^3 If Raizal chose to play the next game, it would be Cyclone. This was revealed by the host Bryan Wong.

Bold denotes the winning pair who managed to win some money
Bold + denotes the winners with the top prize (cleared the top prize level)

All statistics are accurate as of Season 1.

- Most money won: $100,000 (Episode 11)
- Total winnings to date: $228,000 (As at the end of Season 1)
- Total number of winners (by persons) who won some money: 30 (As at the end of Season 1)
- Total number of winners who complete all 10 challenges: 0
- Total number of contestants who got nothing (did not clear the first safety level): 10
- Total number of contestants (by persons) who appeared on the show: 40
- Number of different games played so far: 60
- The highest level attempted up to date: Level 9
- Games that no one have ever survived: Johnny Applestack, Frankenstein, Egg Roll, CD Dominoes, Walrus, Egg Tower, Cyclone
