= Celebrities Under Pressure =

British game show (2003–2004)

- Genre: Game show
- Based on: Happy Family Plan by Tokyo Broadcasting System Television
- Presented by: Melanie Sykes (2003–04); Vernon Kay (2004)
- Country of origin: United Kingdom
- Original language: English
- No. of series: 3
- No. of episodes: 14

Production
- Running time: 60 minutes (inc. adverts)
- Production company: Granada Television

Original release
- Network: ITV
- Release: 13 September 2003 – 7 August 2004

Related
- The Moment of Truth

Celebrities Under Pressure is a British game show that aired on ITV from 13 September 2003 to 7 August 2004. It was first hosted by Melanie Sykes for series 1 & 2 and then hosted by Vernon Kay for series 3.

== Format ==
The show follows families allowing a celebrity to live with them for a week as they attempt to learn a new skill from their hosts. The celebrity's progress is followed through a video diary, before they are tested in a live studio situation. If successful, the celebrity will win a string of prizes for the family they stayed with, however, if they fail, the family goes home with nothing. The show relates strongly to an earlier ITV game show The Moment of Truth, which is the same concept, but with one member of the family, not celebrities.

== Participants ==
=== Series 1 ===
- Show 1 – Samantha Fox, Tara Palmer Tomkinson, Brian Dowling
- Show 2 – Samia Ghadie, Uri Geller, Kerry McFadden
- Show 3 – Phil Tufnell, Fiona Phillips, Bruce Jones
- Show 4 – Jono Coleman, Catalina Guirado, Linda Lusardi
- Show 5 – Antony Audenshaw, Tony Hadley, Sonia
- Show 6 – Ben Freeman, Lesley Joseph, Andrew Whyment

=== Series 2 ===
- Show 1 – Terri Dwyer, John Fashanu, Ken Morley
- Show 2 – Jodie Marsh, John Barnes, Tamara Beckwith
- Show 3 – Amy Nuttall, Ben Shephard, Antony Worrall Thompson
- Show 4 – Kate Garraway, Alan Halsall, James Hewitt

=== Series 3 ===
- Show 1 – Chris Finch, The Cheeky Girls, Nell McAndrew
- Show 2 – Dominic Brunt, Jennie McAlpine, Barry McGuigan
- Show 3 – Alison Hammond, Daniel MacPherson, Caprice Bourret
- Show 4 – Stephen Mulhern, Linda Robson, Jenni Falconer

== Transmissions ==
Series	Start date	End date	Episodes
1	13 September 2003	18 October 2003	6
2	10 January 2004	31 January 2004	4
3	17 July 2004	7 August 2004	4
