= Minute to Win It Vietnam =

- Created by: Friday TV
- Presented by: Nguyên Vũ
- Country of origin: Vietnam
- Original language: Vietnamese
- No. of seasons: 1
- No. of episodes: 26

Production
- Running time: 40–56 minutes w/o commercials (60 minutes with commercials)
- Production companies: Cat Tien Sa Productions; Friday TV; Smart Dog Media

Original release
- Network: HTV7
- Release: May 27 – November 16, 2012

Game	Value
1	1,000,000₫
2	2,500,000₫
3	5,000,000₫
4	10,000,000₫
5	50,000,000₫
6	75,000,000₫
7	125,000,000₫
8	250,000,000₫
9	500,000,000₫
10	1,000,000,000₫

Một phút để chiến thắng (Vietnamese for "one minute to win") is a Vietnamese weekly prime time game show on HTV7 based upon Minute to Win It of NBC. Contestants take part in a series of 60-second challenges that use objects that are commonly available around the house. The ultimate winner would receive 1 billion đồng in cash (about US$44,500), which is the biggest prize in a Vietnamese game show until 2012.

The show is hosted by Nguyên Vũ. The premiere date was originally set on May 20, 2012, airing at 9:30 p.m. (UTC+7) every Sunday, but it was delayed as the official website announced on that day. Later, the official Facebook page announced the new premiere date would be May 27, 2012.

Since July 27, 2012, the show's time slot was changed to 8:35 p.m. (UTC+7) every Friday. From October 5, 2012, it was changed to 9 p.m. (UTC+7) every Friday.

After broadcasting 26 episodes, rerun of the series began on November 23, 2012, and ended on July 19, 2013. The series also reruns Sundays at 7:30 p.m. (UTC+7) on HTV3 since July 7, 2013.
