= International versions of Supermarket Sweep =

Supermarket Sweep is an international television game show franchise of American origin.

Country	Name	Host(s)	TV station	Premiere	Finale
Argentina	Sume y Lleve	Doris del Valle; Emilio Disi	Canal 9	1987	1988
Argentina	Sume y Lleve	Ana María Campoy; Daniel Castex	Canal 9	1987	1988
Argentina	Clink Caja	Berugo Carámbula	Canal 9	1996	1997
Argentina	Super Super	José María Listorti	Canal 9	June 23, 2021	June 29, 2022
Australia	Supermarket Sweep Australia	Ian Turpie	Nine Network	February 10, 1992	February 4, 1994
Brazil	SuperMarket	Ricardo Corte Real	Band	August 30, 1993	June 8, 1998
Brazil	SuperMarket	Ricardo Corte Real	RecordTV	September 18, 2000	January 2001
Belgium	Iedereen Beroemd; De winkelkarquiz	Frederic van Landeghem (Votum)	Één	2012	2012
Canada	Supermarket Sweep (English)	Tino Monte	Syndication	September 13, 1993	September 15, 1995
Canada	Supermarket Sweep (English)	Tino Monte	Global Television Network	September 13, 1993	September 15, 1995
Canada	L'épicerie en folie Metro (French)	Christian Tétreault	TQS	September 12, 1994	June 9, 1995
Chile	Supermarket	Pablo Krögh	Canal 13	August 21, 1995	November 21, 1997
Chile	Supermarket	Juan La Rivera	Canal 13	August 21, 1995	November 21, 1997
Germany	Das Supermarkt-Quiz - Promis kaufen ein	Sükrü Pehlivan	RTL Zwei	April 7, 2021	
Greece	Star Market	Michael Tsaousopoulos	Star Channel	1993	1994
Greece	Σούπερ Μάρκετ; Soúper Márket	Makis Pounentis	ANT1	1994	1995
Greece	Supermarket Sweep	Tony Sfinos (played by Thanos Kiousis)	Mega Channel	December 26, 2020	May 28, 2021
Indonesia	Supermarket Sweep Indonesia	Uya Kuya; Celine Evangelista; Leo Consul	ANTV	March 23, 2023	April 6, 2023
Indonesia	Supermarket Sweep	Ramzi; Resty Ananta; Asyraf Jamal	MNCTV	November 11, 2024	December 21, 2024
Japan	一攫千金!!スーパーマーケット; Ikkaku senkin!	Kazuki Kosakai	Nippon TV	April 7, 1991	September 29, 1991
Mexico	Súper Súper; Las Compras del Trece	? Facundo	Azteca Trece	1998; 2006	1998; 2006
Russia	Гипермаркет; Gipermarket	Artyom Korostelyov	Channel 5	April 2, 2004	2005
Spain	Supermarket	Enrique Simon	Antena 3	February 24, 1992	1992
Turkey	Süpermarket	Erdinç Doğan	Kanal 6	1993	1994
Turkey	Süpermarket	Yiğit Alici	Kanal D	2009	2009
Ukraine	Шоу Шара; Shou Shara	Gennady Popenko; Yulia Kovaleva	Novyi Kanal	October 7, 2012	December 23, 2012
United Kingdom	Supermarket Sweep	Dale Winton	ITV	September 6, 1993	September 6, 2001
United Kingdom	Supermarket Sweep	Dale Winton	ITV	February 12, 2007	August 31, 2007
United Kingdom	Supermarket Sweep	Rylan Clark-Neal	ITV2 (2019); ITV (2020)	September 9, 2019	December 19, 2020
United States (original format)	Supermarket Sweep (English)	Bill Malone; David Ruprecht; Leslie Jones	ABC (1965–67; 2020–22); Lifetime (1990–95); PAX TV (2000–03)	December 20, 1965	January 30, 2022
United States (original format)	Arrasa con Todo con Kmart (Spanish)	Carlos Calderon; Carolina Delgado	Univision	February 7, 2011	August 13, 2011
Vietnam	Siêu thị may mắn Lucky Supermarket	Thanh Bạch	HTV7	June 5, 2005	February 2012
Vietnam	Siêu thị may mắn Lucky Supermarket	Quyền Linh	HTV7	June 5, 2005	February 2012
Vietnam	Siêu thị may mắn Lucky Supermarket	Quốc Bình	HTV7	June 5, 2005	February 2012
Vietnam	Siêu thị may mắn Lucky Supermarket	Minh Béo (as Thần Tài); Hồng Thiên Phúc (as Thần Tài Con)	HTV7	June 5, 2005	February 2012

== See also ==
- List of television game show franchises
