= Clash of the Choirs =

2007 American reality TV miniseries

- Created by: Friday TV
- Directed by: Alan Carter
- Presented by: Maria Menounos
- Judges: Michael Bolton; Patti LaBelle; Nick Lachey; Kelly Rowland; Blake Shelton
- Theme music composer: Vanacore Music
- Country of origin: United States
- No. of seasons: 1

Production
- Executive producers: Jason Raff; Suzy Lamb; Paul Telegdy; Jock Millgårdh; Mattias Ollson
- Producer: John R. Holmes
- Production locations: Brooklyn, New York
- Running time: 2 hours
- Production company: BBC Worldwide America

Original release
- Network: NBC
- Release: December 17 – December 20, 2007

Clash of the Choirs is a reality talent contest miniseries that debuted on NBC in the United States on December 17, 2007. There were four episodes scheduled in the “quick competition”. Maria Menounos is the host of the program, which was performed live from Stage One at Steiner Studios in Brooklyn, New York.

The format was developed by Friday TV from an idea from the Swedish singer and choir leader Caroline af Ugglas. Seven seasons of the Swedish version, Körslaget (The Battle of Choirs), have been broadcast on TV4 in 2008–2013.

The format was a multi-city "bragging rights" competition between 20-person choirs assembled in the hometowns of the recording artists that support them. In the 2007 competition, the choirs competed for a cash prize of $250,000, backed in part by Sony Pictures in support of its upcoming movie release, First Sunday. The film, about petty criminals using a choir in a neighborhood church as part of their scheme, was released 11 January 2008, in the United States and Canada and throughout Europe in April 2008. The prize was in the form of a contribution to a charity active in the artist's hometown.

The choir led by former 98° singer Nick Lachey won the 2007 competition, which was decided by public vote after four nights of live performances. Patti LaBelle's choir finished second, followed by Blake Shelton's, Michael Bolton's, and Kelly Rowland's. The remaining teams received $50,000 each of donations, courtesy of General Electric, parent company of network owner NBC Universal.

The miniseries aired right as most American primetime broadcast television series had run out of new episodes mainly due to the Writers Guild of America strike. Airing the week before Christmas song choices reflected a spiritual tone with one critic speculating that Patti LaBelle's choir was sure to win unless “it’s all a little too much ‘church’ for America”.

NBC announced its 2008–2009 schedule on April 2, 2008, and it also confirmed that Clash of the Choirs would not return for another season. A similar group a cappella competition, The Sing-Off, took place in December 2009 with Nick Lachey hosting.

== Teams and results ==
Celebrity	Hometown	Team's hometown charity	Finish
Nick Lachey	Cincinnati, Ohio	Children's Hospital of Cincinnati	Winners
Patti LaBelle	Philadelphia, Pennsylvania	Lift Our Voices (cancer screenings for African-Americans)	2nd Place
Blake Shelton	Ada, Oklahoma	Project Rebuild (disaster relief), Army MWR	3rd Place
Michael Bolton	New Haven, Connecticut	Domestic Violence Services of New Haven	4th Place
Kelly Rowland	Houston, Texas	Bread of Life (services for homeless people)	5th Place

== Format ==
Choir members were selected in open auditions held in each city with the celebrity officiating. After the top twenty singers from each city were selected, they were sent to New York for rehearsals before the live performances began on 17 December 2007.

I was only interested when they explained that we were going to inspire young, unestablished singers.

— Michael Bolton, commenting on the absence of critical commentary.

Each choir performs, under the direction of their celebrity, and then receives comments from the other competing celebrities. The series has been criticized for not having any real tension or the reality show bite of actual judges. The elimination decision is a public vote by phone and online. The choir with the lowest vote total is eliminated the following night. (In 2007, only the first two nights had eliminations, leading to a "final three.")

As noted, the top prize was a $250,000 donation to the hometown charity.

== Season 1 ==
=== Song list ===
Each choir performed as part of a multi-choir medley format as well as songs for the finale night of the show (20 December). Of the songs listed below only those performed the first three nights were considered towards the final vote. On the third show (19 December), choirs performed three songs each: one as selected by the producers, then a Christmas carol, then a song in which the celebrity became the lead singer.

- Team Rowland
  - 17 December: "Freedom"
  - 18 December: ELIMINATED
- Team Bolton
  - 17 December: "Living on a Prayer"
  - 18 December: "Ain't No Mountain High Enough"
  - 19 December: ELIMINATED
- Team Shelton
  - 17 December: "Life is a Highway"
  - 18 December: "Takin' It to the Streets"
  - 19 December: "Home," "Joy to the World" (medley of traditional carol and Three Dog Night version), "This Can't Be Good"
- Team LaBelle
  - 17 December: "He's Got the Whole World in His Hands"
  - 18 December: "I'll Stand By You"
  - 19 December: "Jesus Take the Wheel," "It's the Most Wonderful Time of the Year," "Somewhere Over the Rainbow"
  - 20 December: "No More Drama," "We Are The Champions"
- Team Lachey
  - 17 December: "Unwritten"
  - 18 December: "Friends in Low Places"
  - 19 December: "Flight of the Bumblebee" (only a cappella song in entire competition), "All I Want for Christmas Is You," "What's Left of Me"
  - 20 December: "What A Wonderful World", "Sing a Song"

== Reception ==
Clash was the top rated show on 19 December and had a viewership of 8.3 million (2.4/7) and "remained steady in adults 18-49" according to Nielsen Media Research. The title sequence created by Framework Studio won a Telly Award

=== U.S. Nielsen Ratings ===
Episode Number	Episode	Rating	Share	Rating/Share (18-49)	Viewers (millions)	Rank (Overall)
1	"Episode 1"	5.4	7	2.5/7	8.13	TBA
2	"Episode 2"	5.2	8	2.4/8	7.73	TBA
3	"Episode 3"	5.4	9	2.4/7	8.23	TBA
4	"Episode 4"	5.6	9	2.3/7	8.06	TBA

== International versions ==
Country	Title	Host	Network	First Aired
Australia	Battle of the Choirs	David Koch	Seven Network	May 2008
Catalonia	Oh Happy Day	Eduard Farelo	TV3	September 21, 2013
China	Mengxiang Hechangtuan 梦想合唱团	Sa Beining 撒贝宁	CCTV-1	2011
Denmark	AllStars	Lisbeth Østergaard	TV2	2008
Estonia	Laululahing	Tarmo Leinatamm	etv	2008
Finland	Kuorosota	Kristiina Komulainen	Nelonen	2009
France	La Bataille des Chorales	Benjamin Castaldi	TF1	2009
Galicia	Oh Happy Day	Rodrigo Vázquez	TVG	2015
Jordan	Harb Al-Karasi حرب الكراسي	Khaled Nour	Channel 1 Jordan	2020
Latvia	Koru Kari	Lauris Reiniks (2008; 2009; 2013) Dainis Grūbe (2025)	TV3	2008, 2009, 2013, 2025
Lithuania	Chorų karai	Vytautas Šapranauskas & Jurgita Jurkutė	TV3	January 16, 2010
Netherlands	Korenslag	Henny Huisman (2007;2008/09); Mark Dik (2010/11)	NPO 1 (2007); NPO 2 (08/09, 10/11)	May 24, 2007
Norway	Det store korslaget	Øyvind Mund	TV2	2009
Poland	Bitwa na głosy	Hubert Urbański & Piotr Kędzierski	TVP 2	2011
Russia	Битва хopов	Valery Meladze	Rossiya 1	September 16, 2012
South Africa	Clash of the Choirs South Africa	Bonang Matheba	DStv	January 27, 2013
Spain	La Batalla de los Coros	Josep Lobató	Cuatro	2008
Sweden	Körslaget	Gry Forssell	TV4	March 29, 2008
Switzerland	Kampf der Chöre	Sven Epiney	SF 1	2010
Turkey	Korolar Çarpışıyor	Behzat Uighur	Show TV	2009
Ukraine	Битва хорів	Yuriy Horbunov	1+1	November 10, 2013
Vietnam	Hợp ca tranh tài	Nguyên Khang	VTV3	February 24, 2012
Estonia	Laululahing	Karl-Erik Taukar	TV3	October 4, 2026

== Production ==
Clash of the Choirs was produced by BBC Worldwide America, also responsible for the ABC hit series Dancing with the Stars. The format is distributed by Friday TV, which is owned by the Scandinavian production company Metronome Film & Television.

The first and third episodes were two hours in length. The second was one hour long, and the finale was also initially scheduled to be an hour. However, on 20 December 2007, NBC announced it would expand the finale from one to two hours.

Clash of the Choirs now airs on The Gospel Music Channel (GMC).

== Sponsors ==
On the first episode, GE pledged $250,000 to the Disabled American Veterans. This was announced just before the performance of the Shelton choir, which features two soldiers from the Army base at Fort Sill, Oklahoma. T-Mobile was another sponsor of the miniseries.

== See also ==
- The Sing-Off
- American Idol
- Dancing with the Stars
- America's Got Talent
- So You Think You Can Dance
- Battle of the Choirs, the Australian version of the show.
- Korenslag, the Dutch version of the show.
