= The Moment of Truth (British game show) =

British game show

- Also known as: Cilla's Moment Of Truth
- Genre: Game show
- Presented by: Cilla Black
- Country of origin: United Kingdom
- Original language: English
- No. of series: 4
- No. of episodes: 36 (inc. 1 special)

Production
- Running time: 60 minutes (inc. adverts)
- Production company: LWT

Original release
- Network: ITV
- Release: 5 September 1998 – 29 September 2001

Related
- Celebrities Under Pressure

The Moment of Truth, later known as Cilla's Moment of Truth, was a British game show based on the original Japanese version called Happy Family Plan. It aired on ITV from 5 September 1998 to 29 September 2001 and was hosted by Cilla Black. Thirty-seven episodes were produced.

The show was axed by ITV after its fourth series, which had been shunted into an earlier 6pm slot by the launch of its football highlights programme The Premiership at 7pm, leading to a sharp drop in ratings.

== Format ==
In the first two series, each week, 3 families would get a chance to win fabulous prizes from Cilla's "Dream Directory". These would typically be cars, holidays, televisions etc. and each member of the family would pick a prize that they wanted. However, to earn the prize, one member of the family, usually Mum or Dad but occasionally an older child, has to perform a very tricky task, such as building a pyramid of cards, playing a piece of music on a keyboard or remembering capital cities of the world. They are given seven days to practice it, but when they arrive at the studio the next week they have one chance (and one chance only) to get it "right on the night". If they do, they win the prizes they chose. If they don't, they lose the prizes they chose. Unlike the original Japanese version, if the nominated family member fails in the task then the younger children are given a consolation prize appropriate for this.

In series two, an "Instant Task" challenge was added, in which members of the studio audience were challenged to complete a simple challenge and win £1,000.

For series three, the show was revamped and renamed Cilla's Moment of Truth. The show was now divided into three main segments, a "Family Challenge" where two families went head-to-head in the same task, the winner earning a luxury foreign holiday whilst the losing family was given the consolation of a European holiday. In the "Group Challenge", a team of players undertook a task together to win a prize for their community. Finally the "Champions Challenge" featured the winner of the previous week's family challenge returning to face a memory test challenge to win a bumper prize package. The "Instant Task" from series two was renamed the "Instant Challenge" and was now filmed beforehand at a different location each week.

In series four, the show was revamped again. The 2000 format was reformatted into a similar style from the first two series, with a unique twist in that everyone in the group had to now practise the task and whoever would face it in the studio would only be revealed prior to the task. The show also introduced an age limit of 16 years old, the reason why was never made clear.

== Transmissions ==
Series	Start date	End date	Episodes
1	5 September 1998	7 November 1998	10
Special	26 December 1998		1
2	11 September 1999	13 November 1999	10
3	2 September 2000	4 November 2000	10
4	25 August 2001	29 September 2001	6
