= Happy Family Plan =

Japanese television game show

- Presented by: Akiko Wada; Ichiro Furutachi
- Country of origin: Japan
- Original language: Japanese

Production
- Running time: 54 minutes

Original release
- Network: TBS Television
- Release: 30 April 1997 – 13 September 2000

Happy Family Plan (しあわせ家族計画, Shiawase Kazoku Keikaku) is a Japanese game show that aired on TBS Television from 30 April 1997 to 13 September 2000 and was hosted by Akiko Wada and Ichiro Furutachi.

== International versions ==
Country	Name	Host(s)	TV station	Premiere	Finale
Australia	The Moment of Truth	Kerri-Anne Kennerley	Network Ten	2001	2001
Canada (Quebec)	Le Moment de vérité	Patrice L'Écuyer	Télévision de Radio-Canada	22 September 2007	19 December 2011
Chile	Si se la puede, gana	Raúl Matas	Canal 13	1998	2004
Czechia	Hodina Pravdy	Petr Svoboda	ČT1	2003	2012
France	Défi de Famille	Sylvain Mirouf	France 3	1999	1999
Germany	Die Stunde der Wahrheit	Christian Clerici	Sat.1	1 October 1999	12 July 2003
Latvia	Spicie triki	Gundars Āboliņš	LNT	2005	2005
New Zealand	Dare to Win	Dominic Bowden	TV2	2008	2008
Poland	Chwila prawdy	Zygmunt Chajzer	TVN	2 September 2002	2004
Russia	Один за всех	Maria Vinarskaya	NTV	8 December 2002	26 January 2003
Spain	Todo en familia	Ramón García	TVE1	12 February 1999	30 March 2001
Turkey	Şans Kapıyı Çalınca	Seray Sever; Kayra Şenocak	Show TV	30 April 1997	2000
Turkey	Şans Kapıyı Çalınca	Emre Altuğ; Ferit Aktuğ (2020)	atv	28 July 2020	5 September 2021
Turkey	Şans Kapıdan Bakınca	Süheyl Uygur	Kanal 7	2007	2008
Ukraine	Один за всіх	Yuriy Horbunov	Novyi Kanal	13 September 2003	26 December 2003
United Kingdom	The Moment of Truth	Cilla Black	ITV	5 September 1998	29 September 2001
United Kingdom	Celebrities Under Pressure	Melanie Sykes	ITV	13 September 2003	7 August 2004
United Kingdom	Celebrities Under Pressure	Vernon Kay	ITV	13 September 2003	7 August 2004
United States	The Big Moment	Brad Sherwood	ABC	3 April 1999	26 June 1999
Vietnam	Kế Hoạch Gia Đình Hạnh Phúc	Quỳnh Hoa, Trọng Thủy, Hữu Luân & Quyền Linh	HTV9	30 March 2008	?/2008
