= Every Second Counts (British game show) =

British television game show

- Genre: Game show
- Presented by: Paul Daniels
- Country of origin: United Kingdom
- Original language: English
- No. of series: 9
- No. of episodes: 142

Production
- Running time: 30 minutes

Original release
- Network: BBC1
- Release: 8 February 1986 – 29 October 1993

Related
- Every Second Counts

Every Second Counts is a British game show based on the American game show of the same name. It aired on BBC1 between 8 February 1986 and 29 October 1993 and was hosted by Paul Daniels.

== Format ==
Gameplay was almost identical to the original version. Each week, three married couples competed against each other to win seconds of time. In each half of the game, one member of each couple sat in the "driver's seat" and answered questions (which were all statements, each with two possible answers). Each correct answer earned seconds, while an incorrect answer eliminated that player from the round. Correct answers in the first half won two seconds, and correct answers in the second half earned four seconds. Players had a choice of two categories of questions for each round.

=== Bonus round ===
Each half of the game also had a bonus round in which each couple had a chance to earn up to 10 additional seconds. Beginning with the couple in last place, each couple chose a category and was asked a question with one correct answer. They had 10 seconds to guess as many times as they wished, and a correct answer added the remaining time to their score.

The couple with the most seconds of time at the end won the game. If the game ended in a tie, a toss-up tiebreaker question was asked and the first player to buzz-in with the correct answer scored one additional second and won the game. The winning couple won a chance to play the final round. The two losing couples received a pair of Every Second Counts watches and an Every Second Counts clock (strangely depicted with the American version's logo).

=== Final round ===
In the final round, the winning couple used the time they earned in the game to win prizes. The round had four levels, each offering a prize of increasing value and requiring four, five, six, and seven correct answers (in that order). The couple chose one of two categories and took turns answering a series of questions, using one of three response choices. The clock began to run when the first question was asked; if the couple gave the required number of correct answers, the clock stopped and they chose a new category to play the next higher level.

If time ran out, the couple received the prizes for both the first level and the highest one completed, plus £20 for each correct answer they had given on the current level. If they completed a level with so little time left that they would have no chance of winning the next prize, the round ended and they received both their prizes and £20 (later £50) for each second remaining. Completing every level before time ran out awarded the first- and fourth-level prizes.

== Transmissions ==
Series	Episodes	Originally released	
Series	Episodes	First released	Last released
1	16	8 February 1986	24 May 1986
2	13	6 September 1986	31 December 1986
Special		18 April 1987	
3	16	24 April 1987	21 August 1987
4	16	4 March 1988	17 June 1988
5	16	17 March 1989	30 June 1989
6	16	8 September 1990	22 December 1990
7	16	10 September 1991	31 December 1991
8	16	30 April 1992	3 September 1992
9	16	14 July 1993	29 October 1993
