= Fear Factor – Nieustraszeni =

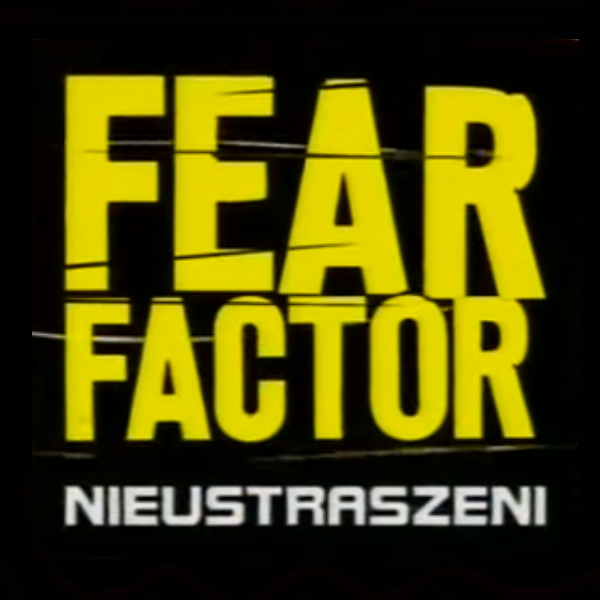
- Genre: reality show
- Based on: Fear Factor
- Directed by: Radoslaw Pełczynski
- Presented by: Roman Polko
- Theme music composer: Trevor Rabin
- Country of origin: Poland
- Original language: Polish
- No. of seasons: 1
- No. of episodes: 9 or 10

Production
- Production locations: Poland; Argentina (finals)
- Running time: 45 minutes
- Production company: Endemol Polska

Original release
- Network: Polsat
- Release: 8 September – 10 December 2004

Related
- Fear Factor

Fear Factor – Nieustraszeni is a Polish reality show, based on Fear Factor, produced by Endemol in 2004.

The series began airing on September 8, 2004, and the premiere episode was viewed by 2,69 mln viewers, (with 24.1% share in 16–49 group). The whole series have seen 2,5 mln viewers (in 16–49 group – 1,47 mln). The series finale was broadcast on December 3, 2024. One more episode most probably aired on December 10, 2024.

The day after the main episode (on Saturdays at 11:00 p.m.) Polsat was airing Fear Factor – Nieustraszeni. Poza cenzurą – which was showing scenes that could not be aired before 11:00 p.m.

== Finalists ==
Miejsce	Imię i nazwisko	Wiek
1.	Artur Lewandowski	29
2.	Marcin Jóźkiewicz	25
3.	Anna Liszkiewicz	
?	Agata Steinhoff	24
?	Wojciech Boretti-Wesołowski	23
?	Anna Cichoń	20
?	Lilianna Nogal	19

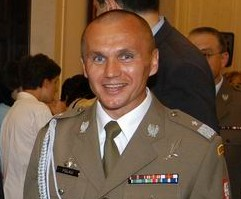
Roman Polko, Polish general and host of the program.
