= Dirty Rotten Cheater =

- Also known as: Cheaters (pilot)
- Genre: Game show
- Presented by: Bil Dwyer
- Narrated by: Craig DeSilva
- Country of origin: United States
- Original language: English
- No. of seasons: 1
- No. of episodes: 13

Production
- Executive producers: Jonathan Goodson; Harris Katleman
- Production location: CBS Television City
- Running time: 60 minutes
- Production company: Jonathan Goodson Productions

Original release
- Network: PAX TV
- Release: January 6 – April 14, 2003

Dirty Rotten Cheater is an American game show that was aired on PAX (now Ion Television). Bil Dwyer hosted the show and Craig DeSilva was the announcer. The TV program was produced by Jonathan Goodson and thirteen episodes were aired overall.

The show's gameplay, originally called Cheaters in the 2002 pilot aired on NBC, combines elements of The Weakest Link and Family Feud along with the BBC game format The Enemy Within, with a contestant being privy to answers in each round and trying to elude detection by fellow contestants and the studio audience.

== Gameplay ==
Six new contestants compete in each episode, one of whom is secretly designated as a "Dirty Rotten Cheater." One by one, each contestant uncovers the monitor at his/her podium to find out whether he/she is the Cheater, then claims not to be.

All questions are similar to those used on Family Feud (for example, "Which parts of their body do women think are too big?"). The 10 most popular answers award money, with each answer worth $250 times its position in the list; the less popular answers, therefore, award more money and are more desirable. At any given time, the Cheater can see the entire list of answers on his/her monitor and may use this information as desired.

=== Rounds 1 through 3 ===
One question is played in the first round, and two each in the second and third rounds. Each contestant gives one answer per question.

After all questions have been played, bonuses are awarded to the contestants who achieved the highest scores in that round: $10,000 for first place, $7,500 for second, and $5,000 for third. In the event of a tie, the relevant bonuses are combined and divided among the tied contestants (e.g. $8,750 to each of two players who tie for first).

The contestants are then given an opportunity to accuse one another of being the Cheater, after which they all secretly vote for the one they believe is the Cheater. The result is determined as follows:

- The first contestant to receive three votes (if any) is eliminated from the game and must truthfully declare whether or not he/she is the Cheater. If he/she is, the other contestants' totals remain unchanged and one of them is secretly designated as the new Cheater. If not, all totals are cut in half.
- If no contestant receives three votes, all totals are cut in half and the Cheater is allowed to secretly eliminate one opponent. All contestants place a hand on a button concealed within their podiums, to protect the Cheater's identity, and the host reads one name a time. The Cheater presses his/her button upon hearing the name of the desired opponent, activating a red light on the stage floor to mark the elimination.

Eliminated contestants forfeit all winnings; however, any honest ones are given a chance to win money at the end of the show.

=== Round 4 ===
Three questions are played in this round, but no bonuses are paid out. After the contestants have voiced their accusations, the studio audience votes on the Cheater's identity. If one contestant receives at least 50% of the vote, he/she is eliminated; if not, the Cheater performs a secret elimination as in the first three rounds. The scores are not affected if the audience eliminates an honest contestant or fails to reach a consensus.

=== Round 5 ===
Two questions are played, with each contestant receiving three turns per question, after which they are each given 15 seconds to convince the audience of their honesty. During the final commercial break, the audience members and any eliminated honest players cast their votes on the Cheater's identity.

After the break, the two contestants stand at center stage next to glass vaults containing their respective winnings. The host reveals the name of the final Cheater, and any honest contestants who voted correctly win $500 each. The result of the audience vote is revealed once the Cheater reaches into his/her vault. If the majority voted correctly, the floor of the Cheater's vault opens and the money drops out of sight; he/she wins nothing, and the honest contestant wins his/her own total. However, if the majority voted incorrectly, the floor does not open; the Cheater wins his/her total and the honest player receives nothing.

The maximum potential prize total is $63,500, attainable by giving the most valuable answer to every question in Rounds 1 through 4, earning the $10,000 bonus in Rounds 1 through 3, giving the three most valuable answers to both questions in Round 5, and losing no money in the voting.

== International versions ==
In the summer 2004, Dirty Rotten Cheater began airing six nights a week on Canale 5 in Italy; the Italian version was named L'imbroglione.

In Japan, the program was broadcasting as The Cheater (ザ・チーター) on TBS between October 2005 and August 2006. It was broadcast as a special program in May 2005, then as a late-night program between October 2005 and March 2006.

A short-lived version of the program also aired on France 2 (July 2006) as "Qui est le bluffeur?" ("Who is the bluffer?") with Belgian host Jean-Michel Zecca.

The UK version was hosted by Brian Conley. Originally this was to transmit in spring 2007, but eventually began on BBC One at 2:35 P.M. on October 15, 2007. It was screened every weekday for three weeks, but was then replaced in the schedule by Diagnosis: Murder - the final five shows switched channels and were shown on November 13 at 2.00pm on BBC Two. The UK version was taped at the Maidstone Studios in Kent, but edited at BBC Television Centre.

There are some format differences between the US and UK versions, the most obvious being that the UK version has one less contestant.

In Poland, ATM Grupa S.A. produced a Polish version of Dirty Rotten Cheater under name Gdzie jest Kłamczuch? (Where's the Liar?) (or simply Kłamczuch (Liar)). The show was transmitted on TV4 channel from September 4, 2008, to June 19, 2009. The program was hosted by Krzysztof Ibisz. The rules were similar to US version, and even used the US version's music in the first season. (The second season used an original but similar-sounding music package.)

In Vietnam, Đông Tây Promotion and HTV produced a Vietnamese version, Tìm người bí ẩn (Find the Hidden), aired weekly from August 8, 2006, to July 2007. The show was originally intended to be the Vietnamese version of The Weakest Link, but was switched due to copyright prices and because the mean format didn't suit Vietnamese culture. This version was hosted by singer and Merited Artist Tạ Minh Tâm (who also hosted the Vietnamese version of Family Feud, also produced by Đông Tây Promotion) and was sponsored by Trà Xanh Không Độ. Unlike other versions, all contestants, including the Cheaters, will receive prizes (if eliminated in the first four rounds they will receive 500,000 VNĐ (later 600,000 VNĐ) and a consolidation prize from Trà Xanh Không Độ, in the final round if one contestant loses the bank in the vault, he or she will leave with 1,000,000 VNĐ. The other contestant will receive the bank, but only a fixed prize of 3,500,000 VNĐ, no matter how much is in the bank.

Most of the European versions were distributed by Distraction Formats.

Country	Name	Host	Network	Date premiered
Bulgaria	Долен мръсен лъжец Dolen mrasen lazhets	Doni	TV2	December 4, 2007 – 2008
France	Qui est le bluffeur ?	Jean-Michel Zecca	France 2	July 3, 2006 – July 28, 2006
India	Bluff Master	Vinod Sherawat	Star One	2004–2005
Italy	L'imbroglione	Enrico Papi	Canale 5	June 7, 2004 – September 4, 2004
Japan	The Cheater (ザ・チーター)	Atsushi Tamura	TBS	October 7, 2005 – August 30, 2006
Poland	Gdzie jest Kłamczuch?	Krzysztof Ibisz	TV4	September 4, 2008 – June 19, 2009
Spain	El enemigo en casa	Daniel Domenjó	La 1 La 2	April 25, 2005 – June 30, 2005
Spain	El tramposo	Juanjo de la Iglesia	Telemadrid	2006
United Kingdom	Dirty Rotten Cheater	Brian Conley	BBC One; BBC Two	October 15, 2007 – December 2007
Vietnam	Tìm người bí ẩn	Tạ Minh Tâm	HTV7	August 8, 2006 – July 2007

An other international version, has also aired in Hungary.
