= Animal Crack-Ups =

American game show

- Genre: Game Show
- Based on: Wakuwaku Dōbutsu Land
- Written by: Todd Thicke
- Presented by: Alan Thicke
- Starring: Debbie Bartlett
- Voices of: Susan Blu
- Theme music composer: Alan and Todd Thicke; Gary Pickus
- Ending theme: "Animals Are Just Like People Too" by Alan Thicke
- Country of origin: United States
- No. of seasons: 3
- No. of episodes: 69

Production
- Executive producer: Vin Di Bona
- Producers: ABC Productions; Vin Di Bona Productions
- Running time: 30 minutes

Original release
- Network: ABC
- Release: August 8, 1987 – September 1, 1990

Animal Crack-Ups is an ABC game show which aired in primetime from August 8 to September 12, 1987, after which it aired on Saturday mornings from September 12, 1987, to December 30, 1989, and again from June 2 to September 1, 1990. It was produced by ABC Productions in association with Vin Di Bona Productions (both companies also produce America's Funniest Home Videos) and hosted by Alan Thicke, who was on Growing Pains at the time. The program was based on a Japanese Tokyo Broadcasting System Television series, Wakuwaku Dōbutsu Land (わくわく動物ランド).

The show's theme song was "Animals Are Just Like People Too", created by Thickovit music (Alan and Todd Thicke and Gary Pickus).

== Gameplay ==
Four celebrities competed. Host Thicke introduced a video clip about an animal; at some point, the video was paused and Thicke asked a question about the clip. The celebrities give their answers, after which the remainder of the clip was played, revealing the answer.

Any celebrities giving the correct answer received a point; score was kept by placing a stuffed animal (a monkey in the first season, a hedgehog in later seasons) in front of the celebrity's podium. Co-host Debbie Bartlett provided the stuffed animals. The celeb with the most toy animals/points won the game and $2,500 for their favorite animal charity. If a tie occurred, the money was split between the charities.

On segues to two commercial breaks, a hedgehog puppet named "Reggie the Hedgie" (voiced by Susan Blu, performed by Lisa Sturz) gave animal facts to the home viewers and read home-viewer mail.

== International versions ==
Country	Name	Host(s)	TV station	Year aired
Japan (original version)	わくわく動物ランド; Wakuwaku Dōbutsu Land	Various	TBS Television	1983–1992
Argentina	Waku Waku	Héctor Larrea	Azul Televisión/Canal 9	1999–2000
Brazil	TV Animal	Angélica; Eliana; Gugu Liberato; Beto Marden; Roberta Peporine	SBT	1988–1992; 1995–1996; 2009–2010
Chile	Maravillozoo	Javier Miranda (1995-1999); Paulina Nin (2000); Antonio Vodanovic (2001-2002)	Canal 13	1995–2002
Netherlands	Waku Waku	Rob Fruithof (1988-1996); Sybrand Niessen (1996-2000); Paula Udondek (2000-2001); Sosha Duysker (2022-)	Nederland 1 NPO Zapp (NPO 3)	1988–2001; 2022–
Portugal	Arca de Noé	Fialho Gouveia; Ana do Carmo; Carlos Alberto Moniz	RTP2; RTP1	1990–1993; 1994–1995
Spain	Waku Waku; Jimanji Kanana	Consuelo Barlanga; Nuria Roca; Rosa García Caro	TVE-1; La 1	1989–1991; 1998–2001; 2003
