= Every Second Counts (American game show) =

- Directed by: Barry Glazer
- Presented by: Bill Rafferty
- Starring: Debbie Bartlett; Susie Carr
- Announcer: Johnny Gilbert
- Country of origin: United States

Production
- Executive producer: Charles Colarusso
- Producer: Peter Noah
- Running time: approx. 26 minutes
- Production companies: Charles Colarusso Productions; Group W Productions

Original release
- Network: Syndicated
- Release: September 17, 1984 – September 1985

Every Second Counts is an American comedy television game show that premiered in syndication on September 17, 1984. The series lasted one season and aired until September 1985. Every Second Counts was a production of Group W Productions and Charles Colarusso Productions.

Bill Rafferty hosted Every Second Counts with Johnny Gilbert announcing. Actress Debbie Bartlett served as the show's hostess for the first half of the season, then left the series in early 1985 to join the cast of The Love Boat and was replaced by Susie Carr.

== Gameplay ==
Three married couples competed in a game of answering questions, with the goal of earning seconds that would later be used in the bonus round at the end of the show.

=== Main game ===
The game was played in two rounds, with the wives playing the first round and the husbands the second.

In each round, three sets of questions were played. Each of these questions were either true/false or this-or-that, and in the latter case the players were presented with two humorous answer choices before the first question was asked. (E.g., "chew it" if an item was a brand of chewing tobacco, or "screw it" if it was a type of screwdriver.) Each set consisted of nine questions, asked in order from left to right. Answering correctly added seconds to the couple's total, with incorrect answers locking them out for the remainder of the set. Each set ended once either all nine questions were asked or all three couples had locked themselves out, whichever came first. Questions were worth two seconds each in the first round, and four in the second. The couple with the most seconds at the end of two rounds won the game and advanced to the bonus round.

During the last question set in the second round, it was possible for the leading couple to win the game by default if both of the other couples locked themselves out first. If this happened, Rafferty continued to ask questions until the leading couple completed the set or gave a wrong answer.

If the game ended in a tie, one final question set was played between the tied couples; as soon as one couple missed a question, their opponents won the game.

=== Bonus round ===
Using their accumulated time, the winning couple played the bonus round for a series of prizes of increasing value. Four levels of prizes were available, each requiring a different number of correct answers. The prize on the fourth level was always a car. All questions in this round had three answer choices.

At the beginning of each level, the couple chose one of two categories and the husband and wife alternated answering the questions. If they gave the required number of correct answers before time ran out, the clock was stopped and they advanced to the next level. Four answers were needed to clear the first level, five for the second, six for the third, and seven for the fourth.

If the couple cleared the fourth level before time ran out, they won all the available prizes. Otherwise, they won the prizes for the levels they had cleared, plus $100 for each correct answer given on the current level when time ran out.

Every Second Counts did not feature returning champions.

== International versions ==
Country	local Name	Host	Network	Year aired
Bahrain	إحسبها صح; Ehsebha sah	Salah Jinahi	Bahrain TV	2010
Indonesia	Detak-Detik	Muhammad Farhan	SCTV	1997–1999
New Zealand	Every Second Counts	Paul Henry	TVNZ	1987–1989
Spain	Los Segundos Cuentan	Elisenda Roca; Lydia Bosch	Antena 3	1990–1991
United Kingdom	Every Second Counts	Paul Daniels	BBC 1	1986–1993
