= Game of Talents =

American television game show

- Genre: Game show
- Directed by: Ashley S. Gorman
- Presented by: Wayne Brady
- Narrated by: Jim Cutler
- Country of origin: United States
- Original language: English
- No. of seasons: 1
- No. of episodes: 10

Production
- Executive producers: Jeff Apploff; Wayne Brady
- Camera setup: Multi-camera
- Production companies: Apploff Entertainment; A Wayne and Mandie Creative; Fremantle

Original release
- Network: Fox
- Release: March 10 – May 25, 2021

Game of Talents is an American game show that aired on Fox from March 10 to May 25, 2021. It is an adaptation of the Spanish game show Adivina qué hago esta noche. The show is hosted and executive produced by Wayne Brady.

== Format ==
Two teams of two compete in each episode. In each episode, seven talents (such as "Illusionist", "Opera Singer", and "Neon Trampolinist") are presented. Six performers appear, one at a time; one of the talents is a decoy.

The first two performers are worth $10,000 each. The first performer introduces themself, and an image or short video is shown that contains clues to the performer's talent. After viewing, one team chooses to guess the performer's talent, or pass and force their opponents to do so. A correct answer earns the guessing team the money; their opponents get the money if they guess incorrectly. Each team gets one chance to choose.

The third and fourth performers are worth $15,000 each. Game play is the same as the first two rounds, except that the decision to play or pass must be made before the clues are presented.

The fifth and deciding performer is worth $60,000. In this round, teams play head-to-head. As soon as the clue is revealed, either team can lock in an answer, which stops the clue and locks the other team out. A right answer wins the active team $60,000 and the game; a wrong answer wins their opponents the money and the game. Losing teams leave with nothing.

At the end of the game, the final performer is introduced and their clue is shown, as in the first four rounds. Teams can choose to walk away with their accumulated winnings or play. If the team plays and guesses correctly, their winnings are doubled, up to a potential $220,000; if they guess incorrectly, they leave with nothing.

== Production ==
On November 19, 2020, it was announced that Fox had ordered the series, with Wayne Brady as host. Brady also serves as executive producer, alongside Jeff Apploff. On February 8, 2021, it was announced that Game of Talents would premiere on March 10, following the fifth season premiere of The Masked Singer. On May 16, 2022, Fox shelved the series indefinitely.

== Episodes ==
No.	Title	Original release date	Prod. code	U.S. viewers (millions)
1	"Floating on Air, Fire and Broken Bones"	March 10, 2021	GTA-109	3.10
Fire Thrower: Sam Tobey; Bonebreaker: Ja'don Christian; 3D Dancer: Jason Whicker & Abigail Rooney; Stand-Up Comedian: DECOY; World Champion Jump Roper: Nicholas & Kaylee Woodard; Levitator: Fernando Velasco; Gospel Singer: Sonia Harley
2	"Dancing, Singing, and a Slew of Swords"	March 17, 2021	GTA-102	2.70
Extreme Pogo Sticker: Russell Kaus; Blues Singer: Madison Taylor Baez; Sword Swallower: Heather Holliday; Clogger: Adison Hillstead; Light Dancer: Kelly Hamilton; Pizza Acrobat: Justin Wadstein; Heavy Metal Artist: DECOY
3	"Twins, Spins, and Bursts of Flames"	March 24, 2021	GTA-105	2.88
Drum Major: Imani Brown; Iron Jaw Artist: April Leopaldi; Opera Singer: Chelsea Snow; Belly Dancer: Ilhan Karabacak; Illusionist: Rob Lake; Human Fireball: DECOY; Neon Trampolinist: Marley Webster
4	"Strings, Flaming Rings, and Björn"	March 31, 2021	GTA-104	2.44
Foot Archer: Bella Gantt; Violinist: Giovanni Mazza; Snake Whisperer: Claudius Shropshire; Magician: DECOY; Electric Puppeter: Ian Carney; Baton Twirler: Mark Nash; Hair Hanging Artist: Samantha Pitard
5	"Crazy Twists, Flying Dummies, and a Scorpion on the Loose"	April 7, 2021	GTA-108	2.31
Sound Sculptor: David Matz; Ventriloquist: DECOY; Stepper: Miles Guichard; Hand Balancer: Maral Byambasuren; Danger Juggler: Owen Morse & Jon Wee; Harmonica Player: Johnny Roquemore; Scorpion Wrangler: Steven C. Ceriotti
6	"Flying Dogs, Flipping Tricks, and Flaming Cocktails"	April 14, 2021	GTA-110	2.61
Salsa Dancer: DECOY; Cheerleader: Dominique Lewis; Yo-Yo Sensation: Stoney Mack; Flying K-9 Coach: Nikki Penta; Flair Bartender: Shea Lewis; Trick Roper: Angelo Iodice; Extreme Roller Skater: Jenny Arata
7	"Fire Twirling, Cube Juggling and a Wild Alligator"	May 5, 2021	GTA-106	2.22
Indoor Surfer: DECOY; Slackline Walker: Olga Henry; Rubik's Cube Solver: Ethan Jan; Hula Hooper: Brookelynn Bley; Alligator Wrangler: Pharaoh Gayles; Fire Dancer: Mata Grey Uiagalelei; Slam Dunk Champ: Kregg Thomassen
8	"Lions, Bikers, and Bubbles, OH MY!"	May 12, 2021	GTA-103	2.23
Hip Hop Dancer: Kea Peahu; Fire Hooper: Grace Good; Daredevil Biker: Johnny Obando; Bubbleologist: Sterling Johnson; Human Candelabra: Joann Zhuang; Beatboxer: Steven Cantor; Lion Trainer: DECOY
9	"Balloons, Bo Staffs, and a Blazing Chainsaw"	May 19, 2021	GTA-107	2.52
Aerialist: Amadeus Lopez; Yodeler: Kathrin Jakob; Martial Arts Expert: Mason Bumba; Limbo Skater: Kaitlyn Conner; Jazz Pianist: DECOY; Chainsaw Juggler: Aaron Bonk; Contemporary Dancer: DJ Smart
10	"Animals Flip, Bellies Flop, and Knives Fly"	May 25, 2021	GTA-101	1.14
Knife Thrower: David Adamovich; Synchronized Dancer: Emma Qiao; Contortionist: Emerald Gordon Wulf; Belly Flopper: DECOY; Cabaret Singer: Haylee Bice; Animal Acrobat: Elijah Holt; Pole Aerialist: Sean Sellek

== Ratings ==
Viewership and ratings per episode of Game of Talents
No.	Title	Air date	Timeslot (ET)	Rating/share (18–49)	Viewers (millions)	DVR (18–49)	DVR viewers (millions)	Total (18–49)	Total viewers (millions)	Ref.
1	"Floating on Air, Fire and Broken Bones"	March 10, 2021	Wednesday 9:00 p.m.	0.7/5	3.10	—N/a	—N/a	—N/a	—N/a	
2	"Dancing, Singing, and a Slew of Swords"	March 17, 2021	Wednesday 9:00 p.m.	0.7/5	2.70	—N/a	—N/a	—N/a	—N/a	
3	"Twins, Spins, and Bursts of Flames"	March 24, 2021	Wednesday 9:00 p.m.	0.7/5	2.88	—N/a	—N/a	—N/a	—N/a	
4	"Strings, Flaming Rings, and Björn"	March 31, 2021	Wednesday 9:00 p.m.	0.6/4	2.44	0.0	0.23	0.6	2.67	(Note: Live+7 ratings were not available, so Live+3 ratings have been used instead.)
5	"Crazy Twists, Flying Dummies, and a Scorpion on the Loose"	April 7, 2021	Wednesday 9:00 p.m.	0.6/4	2.31	0.1	0.34	0.7	2.65	
6	"Flying Dogs, Flipping Tricks, and Flaming Cocktails"	April 14, 2021	Wednesday 9:00 p.m.	0.6/4	2.61	0.1	0.37	0.7	2.98	
7	"Fire Twirling, Cube Juggling and a Wild Alligator"	May 5, 2021	Wednesday 9:00 p.m.	0.5/4	2.22	0.1	0.31	0.6	2.53	
8	"Lions, Bikers, and Bubbles, OH MY!"	May 12, 2021	Wednesday 9:00 p.m.	0.5/3	2.23	0.0	0.22	0.6	2.45	
9	"Balloons, Bo Staffs, and a Blazing Chainsaw"	May 19, 2021	Wednesday 9:00 p.m.	0.6/4	2.52	0.0	0.22	0.7	2.74	
10	"Animals Flip, Bellies Flop, and Knives Fly"	May 25, 2021	Tuesday 8:00 p.m.	0.2/2	1.14	0.1	0.18	0.3	1.33	
