= 30 Seconds to Fame =

- Genre: Talent competition series
- Created by: Joe Revello; Michael Binkow
- Directed by: Don Weiner
- Presented by: Craig J. Jackson
- Narrated by: Jonathan Mangum
- Country of origin: United States
- Original language: English
- No. of seasons: 1
- No. of episodes: 16

Production
- Executive producers: Joe Revello; Michael Binkow
- Camera setup: Videotape; Multi-camera
- Running time: 22 minutes
- Production companies: Wild Jams Productions; 20th Century Fox Television

Original release
- Network: Fox
- Release: July 17, 2002 – June 26, 2003

30 Seconds to Fame is an American television series that was shown on the Fox Network from July 17, 2002 to June 26, 2003, featuring a talent show where acts could only last up to 30 seconds each, regardless of any resolution to the act. The series was hosted by Craig Jackson.

Many talents were exhibited, such as contortionism, juggling, magic tricks, stand-up comedy, and beatboxing, in addition to singing and dancing acts. Much of the charm of the show was derived from the fact that each act lasted only 30 seconds, leading to a variety of acts being displayed. The live audience acted as the judges. During the performances, if the audience found an act undesirable to watch, they booed and used electronic devices to put in a vote for elimination, complete with an on-screen "Eliminator" scale graphic (colored in green, yellow, and red). If enough people did so (i.e. the "Eliminator" scale needle hit any part of the red area), the act was to be cut short, regardless of how much time was left on the clock.

At the end of the show, every member of the audience voted for his or her favorite act, and the top three acts got a chance to do another 30-second performance. After this, a final round of voting occurred, and the winner earned a cash prize of US$25,000.

The network began to rerun the series on their Saturday late night block in January 2011 in order to fill the half-hour after Fringe which was vacated by the canceled Running Wilde, until the launch of the Animation Domination High Definition block in July 2013; the late night timeslot was used for repurposed reruns of recent Fox series after Fox temporarily ending original late night programming in September 2010.

== International versions ==
These versions are no longer airing.

Country	Name	Host	Network	Date premiered	Prize
Argentina	30 Segundos De Fama	Marcelo Tinelli	Telefe	2004	$25.000
Brazil	Se vira nos 30	Faustao	Rede Globo	2002	R$30.000
Brazil	Super Se vira nos 30	Faustao	Rede Globo	2002	R$100.000
Indonesia (Note: Global TV picked this format which was distributed with FremantleMedia.)	30 Detik Menjadi Bintang	Dik Doank	Global TV	2005	Rp390.000.000 and car
South Africa	30 Seconds to Fame	Kenny Maistry	SABC 3	2009	
