= Friday TV =

Swedish television production company

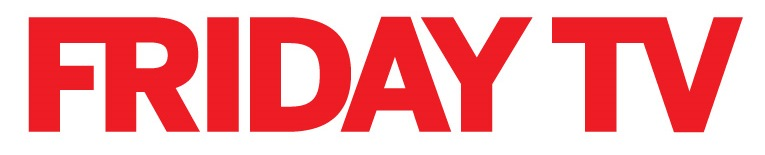
- Company type: Subsidiary
- Industry: Television production
- Founded: October 2004
- Founders: Estelle Bodén; Mattias Olsson; Jock Millgårdh
- Headquarters: Stockholm, Sweden
- Parent: Metronome Film & Television

Friday TV (sometimes credited as Friday TV AB) creates and distributes television formats. Friday TV also provides production and consulting services to television production companies and broadcasters worldwide.

== History ==
Friday TV is based in Stockholm, Sweden and was founded in October 2004 as a joint venture between Estelle Bodén, Mattias Olsson, Jock Millgårdh, and Metronome Film & Television. Metronome Film & Television is Scandinavia's largest independent film and TV production company with subsidiaries in Sweden, Norway, Denmark and Finland. In Scandinavia Friday TV's formats are produced exclusively by the Metronome group.

Bodén, Olsson, and Millgårdh met while working at Swedish production company Strix Television. At Strix Millgårdh and Olsson oversaw the development of formats such as The Farm (La Ferme Célébrités/ La Granja), The Bar, Expedition Robinson, Kerry's Getting Married (Yasmin's Getting Married), and Harem (Opération Séduction/ Libertad Vigilada).

In 2007 Friday TV became a wholly owned subsidiary of Metronome. In April 2009 Metronome was acquired by UK's Shine Group. News Corporation acquired Shine Group in April 2011. In 2012 Bodén, Millgårdh and Olsson left the company. Bodén was replaced as MD by Per Blankens. In May 2013 Blankens left Friday to become executive producer of American Idol, Friday TV's head of development Simon Romanus was appointed interim MD in his place. In April 2014 Marika Makaroff, former chief of FremantleMedia Finland, assumed the MD role at Friday TV, and Romanus resumed his head of development position.

== Formats ==
Friday TV has created over 40 original TV formats that have been sold into more than 70 countries. The company's internationally most successful formats are Minute to Win It (Die Perfekte Minute/ Minuto para ganar), Clash of the Choirs, and Single Moms (Must Love Kids/ Maman cherche l’amour). Friday TV's formats have aired on broadcasters such as NBC, TLC and MundoFox in the United States, France 2, M6, and TF1 in France, Sat.1 and RTL Television in Germany, CCTV in China, Cuatro and Antena 3 in Spain, Nelonen in Finland, Seven Network in Australia, Kanal 4, TV2 and TV3 in Denmark, TV2 and TVNorge in Norway as well as TV3, SVT, Kanal 5 and TV4 in Sweden.

In 2007 NBC commissioned the Friday TV-format Clash of the Choirs. Local versions of Clash of the Choirs have subsequently aired in 19 countries, including France, Spain, Poland, India, Colombia, Sweden, Norway, Denmark, and China. In October 2008 Friday TV opened an office in Los Angeles. In September 2009 NBC commissioned a second format from Friday TV, the game show Minute to Win It. Minute to Win It has to date been sold to broadcasters in 68 countries, including Germany, Spain, India, Sweden, Australia, Malaysia, Netherlands, Czech Republic, Peru, Chile, Belgium, Poland, and Brazil. On October 6, 2010 Minute to Win It was awarded the C21/Frapa Award for Best studio based game show format at the MIPCOM Television Festival in France. In Los Angeles, Friday TV has also done the casting for the international adaptations of the Metronome format Swedish Hollywood Wives in Denmark, Norway, Spain, Belgium, Poland, and Holland.
