= Beat the Star (Australian game show) =

- Host introducing show
- Starring: Daniel MacPherson
- Country of origin: Australia
- No. of series: 1
- No. of episodes: 4

Production
- Producer: Seven Media Group
- Running time: 48 minutes

Original release
- Network: Seven Network
- Release: 7 September 2010 – 13 January 2011

Related
- Schlag den Raab

Beat the Star is an Australian game show, based on the British version, which in turn is based on the German game show Schlag den Raab (Beat Raab). The series is hosted by Daniel MacPherson and produced by Seven Media Group for the Seven Network. A family tries to beat a celebrity in a number of minigames in order to win a jackpot, starting at $50,000.

On 10 September 2010, Seven Network announced that it was removing Beat the Star from its programming schedule after the airing of the second episode. The Seven Network eventually aired the remaining two episodes January 2011.

== Format ==
Every episode features one family member at a time, competing against a celebrity in a number of games. The games include sports-oriented contests such as climbing, motorsport and ice hockey, mind games such as puzzles and numerous other unusual challenges. Winning games can earn the contestant varying numbers of points for the winner and successful contestants win a prize of $50,000. If the celebrity wins, the jackpot rolls over. There are eight challenges in match; the points value for winning each task increments from one to eight.

== Episodes ==
Indicates that the star won
Indicates that the challenger won
Indicates that the result is pending

=== Series 1 ===
Episode	Candidate	Celebrity	Broadcast date	Games	Scores		Winner	Prize
1	The Mort Family	Manu Feildel	7 September 2010	Pea in a Bottle, The Squeeze, Where in the World, The Firing Line, The Chop, Panic Plank & The Toaster	10	26	The Mort Family	$50,000
2	The Carter Family	Andrew Gaze	14 September 2010	Blow up the Host, Whisky Business, Hit the Wall, Shootout, Body Blizzard, Vertical Limit & The Toaster	13	23	The Carter Family	$50,000
3	The Williams Family	Layne Beachley	6 January 2011	TBA	22	14	Layne Beachley	$50,000
4	The Gissing Family	Daniel MacPherson	13 January 2011				The Gissing Family	$50,000

== Production ==
The series is produced by Seven Media Group. Contestant and audience calls were advertised on Network Seven and its digital multi-channel 7Two and in early 2010. Brad Lyons, Head of Production, explained "We have always loved this format and have gathered an amazing bunch of celebrities for our families to battle. To see an 11-year-old kid take on a world champion boxer makes for great viewing." It was announced via a media release Manu Feildel, Ada Nicodemou, Danny Green, Andrew Gaze, Jennifer Hawkins and Layne Beachley were to appear on the show. Amid poor ratings, the show was pulled from Network Seven's line-up after only two episodes aired. The remaining episodes did, however, air over December and January.

== Reception ==
=== Ratings ===
The first episode premiered with only 955,000 viewers with a nightly ranking of twelfth and losing its timeslot to Top Gear, The 7.30 Report and Talkin' 'Bout Your Generation The programme failed to live up to other Seven Network game show Minute to Win It, which premiered to 1,130,000 viewers The second episode garnered only 862,000 viewers, losing again to Talkin' 'Bout Your Generation and Top Gear.

Episode	Date Aired	Timeslot	Rating	Nightly Rank	Weekly Rank
1.01	7 September 2010	Tuesday 7:30pm	955,000	12	42
1.02	14 September 2010	Tuesday 7:30pm	862,000	14	54
