= Schlag den Henssler =

German game show (2017–2018)

- Promotional artwork
- Genre: Game show
- Presented by: Elton
- Starring: Steffen Henssler
- Countries of origin: Germany
- Original language: German
- No. of series: 2
- No. of episodes: 8

Production
- Production location: Cologne, Germany
- Running time: 4 to 5 hours
- Production company: Brainpool TV

Original release
- Network: ProSieben
- Release: 30 September 2017 – 22 September 2018

Related
- Schlag den Raab and Beat the Star

Schlag den Henssler (lit. 'Beat Henssler' in German) was a short-lived live game show, televised by German TV network ProSieben on Saturday evenings from September 2017 to September 2018. The show ran for two seasons and produced a total of eight episodes, which followed a contestant competing with German TV chef and personality Steffen Henssler in a number of competitions for a jackpot starting at €250,000.

Created as a reboot to its long-running predecessor Schlag den Raab, the format of the show remained largely the same, but viewership with Henssler as the host was significantly less. Due to low ratings, the show was ended, and ProSieben focused on another spinoff of Raab's show titled Schlag den Star, and Henssler returned to Grill den Henssler, a show he had hosted previously. In February 2024, a clip from one of the competitions resurfaced on social media, making the show known to an international audience.

== Format ==
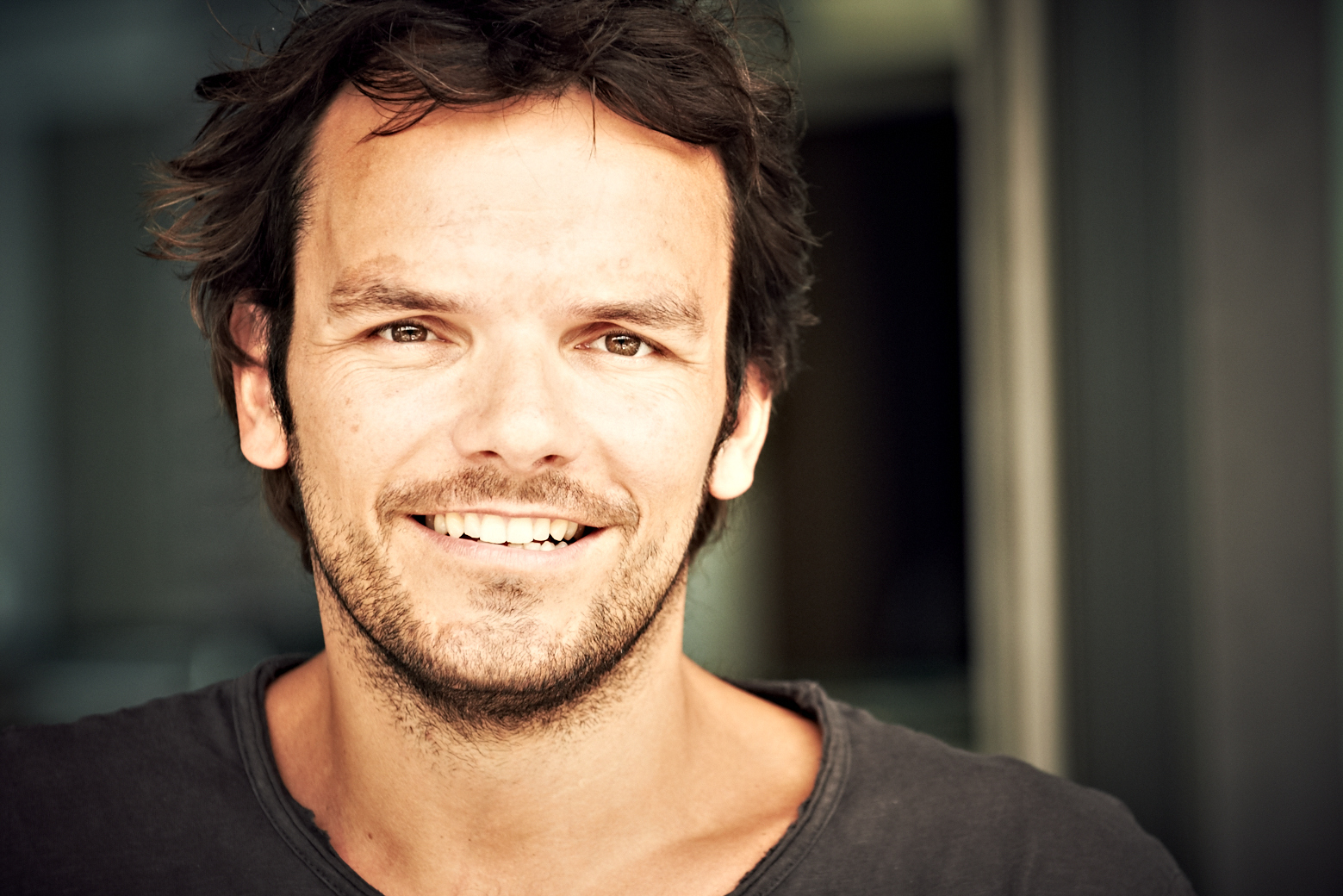
Steffen Henssler in 2012

The live game show saw contestants compete in multiple mini-game competitions against German TV chef Steffen Henssler in an attempt to earn the most points. Contestants were chosen at the beginning of each episode by popular vote from TV viewers after an introduction round against Henssler. Contestants were selected through televoting or in advance through online voting. Once a contestant was chosen, the show's host Elton began the competitions. These varied each episode, and ranged from quizzes and knowledge-based tests to sports to other skill-based tests. The maximum amount of competitions per episode was fifteen, with the amount of points awarded increasing as the number of competitions rose. If a contestant scored more points than Henssler by the end of the episode, they received the jackpot starting at €250,000 or around US$270,000. If Henssler scored more points, the jackpot had an extra €250,000 added onto it for the next episode, until a contestant ultimately won.

The duration of each episode varied depending on the amount of competition taking place in it, but often lasted between four and five hours. One of the longest episodes of the show lasted until 2 am the following day, after starting at 8:15 pm. For episode four, the ability to vote for the episode's contestant online was suspended on suspicion of manipulation and fraud.

== History ==
Beginning in 2017, the show was set to be a reboot of its long-running predecessor Schlag den Raab, or "Beat Raab", which followed a similar premise, except featuring German TV host Stefan Raab. Schlag den Raab, which was broadcast by TV network ProSieben from 2006 to 2015, was regarded by German newspaper Augsburger Allgemeine as "one of the most popular game shows on German television", and started the format of Beat the Star shows, which after being sold, broadcast internationally through regional spinoffs.

"I gave it my all, but there's no point beating around the bush: the audience doesn't want to see me in this role and I just have to accept that. And that's why it's now time to wipe my mouth and move on to the next adventure."

— Steffen Henssler, in a statement released by ProSieben which announced his departure

It took four episodes for the first contestant to win against Henssler, a teacher named Xabier Urkiaga, who claimed the built-up jackpot of €1,000,000. The show did not live up to expectations, however, with episodes averaging a total of 3 million fewer viewers than Raab's show in some instances. The target audience of viewers between the ages of 14 and 49 also dropped to a low of 7.9%. Shortly following the release of episode eight, on 26 September 2018, ProSieben released a joint statement with Henssler announcing his departure, in which Henssler acknowledged and accepted the low viewership, and stated his intentions to stay on air in other shows. Henssler continued, saying he did not regret starting the show, knowing well that taking the show from such a popular personality like Raab could easily be unsuccessful, but that "its just television" in the end, and not more serious.

Henssler, who had been a TV personality since 2004, previously was the host and namesake of another show on the TV network VOX running since 2013 named Grill den Henssler, or "Grill Henssler", before leaving it for Schlag den Henssler on ProSieben in autumn 2017. In his absence, the show became Grill den Profi, or "Grill the Pro", but was rebooted on 5 May 2019 when Henssler returned after the cancellation of Schlag den Henssler. Since returning to a chef-oriented personality on TV, Henssler found much more success, and owns several restaurants and a cooking school, and has written multiple cookbooks. The format of Schlag den Henssler continued again after Henssler's departure as Schlag den Star, or "Beat the Star", on 8 December 2018, which instead uses celebrity contestants and broadcasts live.

== Legacy ==
The show became briefly popular to an international audience in February 2024 after a clip of one of the show's competitions was posted by the news streaming website Dexerto on X, with the somewhat misleading caption: "There is a german TV show where contestants try to split things perfectly in half". The 20-second clip in question showed Henssler succeeding to cut a soft pretzel perfectly in half, based on the weight of each side. The clip had gained upwards of 67.6 million views on X shortly after being posted, and became popular on Facebook, Instagram, and TikTok as well. Many online were disappointed no such show based solely around cutting food in half actually existed.

== Episodes ==
Below is a list of all eight episodes of the game show, spanning two seasons. Also provided is the jackpot amount and the winner of the episode.

=== Season one ===
Episode	Date	Jackpot amount	Winner
1	30 September 2017	€250,000	Henssler
2	4 November 2017	€500,000	Henssler
3	16 December 2017	€750,000	Henssler
4	24 March 2018	€1.000000	Contestant
5	5 May 2018	€250,000	Henssler
6	9 June 2018	€500,000	Contestant

=== Season two ===
Episode	Date	Jackpot amount	Winner
1	18 August 2018	€250,000	Contestant
2	22 September 2018	€250,000	Henssler
