= Schlag den Raab =

- Genre: Game show
- Created by: Stefan Raab
- Directed by: Ladislaus Kiraly
- Presented by: Matthias Opdenhövel (2006–2011); Steven Gätjen (2011–2015)
- Starring: Stefan Raab
- Country of origin: Germany
- Original language: German
- No. of series: 11
- No. of episodes: 55

Production
- Producer: Jörg Grabosch
- Production locations: Mülheim, Cologne, Germany
- Running time: 226 up to 371 minutes (including commercials)
- Production companies: Raab TV, Brainpool

Original release
- Network: ProSieben
- Release: 23 September 2006 – 19 December 2015

Related
- Beat the Star

Schlag den Raab (German pronunciation: [ʃlaːk deːn ʁaːp], German for Beat (the) Raab) was a live game show that was televised by German television channel ProSieben on Saturday evenings from September 2006 until December 2015. A total of six episodes were produced and broadcast each year and featured one contestant competing with media personality Stefan Raab in a number of disciplines for a variable amount of money.

== Concept ==
At the beginning of an episode five possible candidates (usually four men and one woman) were introduced to the audience. Each candidate presented him- or herself in a short video clip of one minute (three minutes before the 45th episode). The TV audience then determined the person to compete with Stefan Raab by televoting. One episode consisted of up to 15 games between Raab and the contestant plus one tiebreaker game if the scoreline was even after the fifteenth game. Each episode consecutively won by Raab added €500,000 to the jackpot, e.g. the prize money in an episode following three consecutive Raab victories summed up to €2,000,000. A losing contestant did not receive any prize money at all, regardless of the final scoreline.

The games included sports contests such as biathlon, go-karting, badminton and ice hockey, puzzles, quizzes and various other challenges, each episode featuring different games than the ones before, except for one quiz called Blamieren oder Kassieren, which appeared in almost every episode. The majority of games were played in the studio, a few games had to be carried out outside (like the aforementioned biathlon contest or riding a speed boat in the Cologne harbor). The first game awarded one point, the second game two points and up to fifteen points for the fifteenth game. The show ended once Raab or his opponent gained more than 60 of the possible 120 points. Therefore, the earliest point to win an episode was after completion of the eleventh game (1+2+3+4+5+6+7+8+9+10+11=66). Due to this extraordinary distribution of points it was possible to win an episode despite losing the majority of games, e.g. if one was successful the final five games (11+12+13+14+15=65) while the opponent was successful in the first ten games (1+2+3+4+5+6+7+8+9+10=55).

Six episodes of Schlag den Raab were broadcast each year, three in the first half of the year and another three in the second half of the year. The last episode aired on 19 December 2015. For this last episode, each of fifteen contestants faced Raab in one game. Each contestant who managed to defeat Raab received €100,000 from the €1.5 million prize fund and moved on to a final game. For the final game, all of the contestants who had beaten Raab played against each other for the remaining money. Six contestants beat Raab in their games, so that the winner of the final game received an additional €900,000.

Each episode also featured up to four music artists.

== History ==
As the show was broadcast live and the games were of different duration, a single episode generally had no fixed time limit. It regularly ran for four or more hours including commercials. The very first episode ended just after midnight at 00:01 after a runtime of three hours and 46 minutes and was therefore the shortest episode. The 49th and longest episode ended at 02:23, which equals a runtime of six hours and eight minutes.

Raab won 38 of the 54 episodes, not counting the final episode in which Raab faced multiple opponents. He was first defeated in the third episode, when contestant Matthias Göbel won €1.5 million. The highest amount won by a single contestant was €3.5 million (Bernd Stadelmann on 15 December 2012). On three occasions an episode ended after just eleven games – each time Raab being the winner. The fastest candidate to beat Raab was Deaon Maxwell (episode 27) after 12 games. Two candidates, one female and one male, were defeated without scoring a single point. Until 25 April 2015 no woman had defeated Raab.

All candidates except Jan May (episode 12) were younger than Raab on the date of the episode. On 1 November 2014, the episode had to be postponed for the first time in the history of the show, as Raab was suffering from a severe cold. That episode eventually aired a fortnight later, on 15 November 2014.

In June 2015, Raab announced his retirement from television, which ultimately led to the show's cancellation in the same year. The last episode aired on 19 December 2015.

Schlag den Raab was one of the most successful Saturday evening shows in Germany in the late 2000s and early 2010s with audiences of up to four million people.

== Awards ==
The show was nominated for the Adolf Grimme Awards category entertainment/special in 2007 and 2008. Schlag den Raab won the Deutscher Fernsehpreis for Best Entertainment Show in 2007, and won a Goldene Kamera in the category Entertainment in 2008.

== Episodes ==
| Episode | Date | Prize money | Contestant | End result | Games | Winner | End of the show | Music |
|---|---|---|---|---|---|---|---|---|
| Episode 1 | 23 September 2006 | €0.5M | Esther Frericks (30, businesswoman) | 21–70 | 13 | Raab | 00:01 | Juli, Nelly Furtado feat. Saukrates, Nena feat. Duncan Townsend |
| Episode 2 | 18 November 2006 | €1.0M | Johannes Rieks (25, student) | 31–74 | 14 | Raab | 00:43 | Take That, Katie Melua |
| Episode 3 | 27 January 2007 | €1.5M | Matthias Göbel (31, designing engineer) | 72–48 | 15 | contestant | 00:54 | Tokio Hotel, Simply Red, Jamelia |
| Episode 4 | 14 April 2007 | €0.5M | Nils-Heiko Hutter (29, pilot) | 13–65 | 12 | Raab | 00:30 | Michael Bublé, Joss Stone, Carla Bruni |
| Episode 5 | 9 June 2007 | €1.0M | Peter Dietrich (39, doctor) | 70–35 | 14 | contestant | 01:16 | Melanie C, Max Mutzke |
| Episode 6 | 15 September 2007 | €0.5M | Martin Trautz (38, policeman) | 60–60 | 15+1 | contestant | 01:21 | James Blunt, Sportfreunde Stiller, Monrose |
| Episode 7 | 3 November 2007 | €0.5M | Sonja Bartelt (33, policewoman) | 19–72 | 13 | Raab | 00:17 | Max Mutzke, Nicole Scherzinger |
| Episode 8 | 15 December 2007 | €1.0M | Gene Allen (38, financial adviser) | 56–64 | 15 | Raab | 01:01 | Peter Cincotti, Room2012 |
| Episode 9 | 19 January 2008 | €1.5M | Arvid Bollmann (39, teacher) | 35–70 | 14 | Raab | 00:57 | Stefanie Heinzmann, Ich + Ich |
| Episode 10 | 5 April 2008 | €2.0M | Jens Ohlemeyer (35, teacher) | 25–66 | 13 | Raab | 00:22 | Duffy, Gregor Meyle |
| Episode 11 | 31 May 2008 | €2.5M | Olufemi Smith (29, marketing manager) | 65–55 | 15 | contestant | 01:32 | Estelle, Leona Lewis |
| Episode 12 | 13 September 2008 | €0.5M | Jan May (44, sauna worker) | 29–62 | 13 | Raab | 00:31 | Sarah Connor, Katy Perry, Pussycat Dolls |
| Episode 13 | 1 November 2008 | €1.0M | Ole Bischof (29, judoka) | 3–63 | 11 | Raab | 00:08 | Rosenstolz, Stefanie Heinzmann, Grace Jones |
| Episode 14 | 20 December 2008 | €1.5M | Markus Kapries (39, doctor) | 19–72 | 13 | Raab | 00:48 | James Blunt, Queensberry |
| Episode 15 | 17 January 2009 | €2.0M | Marcus Gangloff (39, teacher) | 33–72 | 14 | Raab | 00:43 | Max Mutzke, James Morrison, Mando Diao |
| Episode 16 | 18 April 2009 | €2.5M | Markus "Oku" Okuesa (32, teacher and musician) | 43–62 | 14 | Raab | 01:28 | Silbermond, Milow, Lady Gaga |
| Episode 17 | 23 May 2009 | €3.0M | Nino Haase (26, chemistry doctorand) | 63–57 | 15 | contestant | 01:34 | Daniel Merriweather, The Black Eyed Peas, Sportfreunde Stiller |
| Episode 18 | 12 September 2009 | €0.5M | Hans-Martin Schulze (24, pharmacy intern) | 68–52 | 15 | contestant | 00:41 | Stefanie Heinzmann, Tokio Hotel, Jan Delay |
| Episode 19 | 31 October 2009 | €0.5M | Oliver Wojahn (41, professor) | 20–71 | 13 | Raab | 00:56 | Marius Müller-Westernhagen, Pixie Lott, Ich + Ich |
| Episode 20 | 19 December 2009 | €1.0M | Amelie Mooseder (24, student) | 20–71 | 13 | Raab | 00:41 | Xavier Naidoo, Robbie Williams, Some & Any, Gossip |
| Episode 21 | 16 January 2010 | €1.5M | Torsten Reichan (31, pilot) | 15–63 | 12 | Raab | 00:03 | Aura Dione, Alicia Keys |
| Episode 22 | 10 April 2010 | €2.0M | Hans Martin Wismar (29, emergency surgeon) | 64–41 | 14 | contestant | 00:46 | Gentleman, Cheryl Cole |
| Episode 23 | 8 May 2010 | €0.5M | Thorsten Engelmann (28, controller) | 42–63 | 14 | Raab | 01:00 | Toni Braxton, Lena, Die Fantastischen Vier |
| Episode 24 | 18 September 2010 | €1.0M | Thorsten Knaack (29, teacher) | 72–48 | 15 | contestant | 01:35 | Phil Collins, Kylie Minogue, Juli |
| Episode 25 | 23 October 2010 | €0.5M | Ria Sabay (25, student) | 0–66 | 11 | Raab | 00:26 | Mando Diao, Christian Durstewitz, Aloe Blacc |
| Episode 26 | 18 December 2010 | €1.0M | Heiko Schumacher (28, logistician) | 64–27 | 13 | contestant | 00:41 | LaVive, Cee-Lo Green |
| Episode 27 | 15 January 2011 | €0.5M | Deaon Maxwell (33, student) | 61–17 | 12 | contestant | 00:08 | Max Mutzke, Bruno Mars |
| Episode 28 | 2 April 2011 | €0.5M | Alexandra Stegmann (27, management consultant) | 18–73 | 13 | Raab | 00:37 | Milow, Natalia Kills |
| Episode 29 | 4 June 2011 | €1.0M | Tobias Rieder (29, army doctor) | 44–61 | 14 | Raab | 01:33 | Jessie J, Avril Lavigne |
| Episode 30 | 17 September 2011 | €1.5M | Gil Kwamo-Kamdem (30, policeman) | 60–60 | 15+1 | contestant | 01:49 | Lenny Kravitz, Udo Lindenberg feat. Inga Humpe, Lena |
| Episode 31 | 15 October 2011 | €0.5M | Klaus Hermann (39, insurance broker) | 68–37 | 14 | contestant | 01:14 | Rosenstolz, Blue Man Group & Tracy Bonham, Noel Gallagher's High Flying Birds |
| Episode 32 | 17 December 2011 | €0.5M | Oliver Wallkötter (38, soldier) | 0–66 | 11 | Raab | 00:25 | Flying Steps, Zaz, Flo Mega |
| Episode 33 | 17 March 2012 | €1.0M | Alexander Bitsch (32, customs dog handler) | 48–72 | 15 | Raab | 02:05 | Caligola, Stefanie Heinzmann, Unheilig |
| Episode 34 | 14 April 2012 | €1.5M | Reint Janssen (30, sport scientist) | 41–64 | 14 | Raab | 00:22 | Rebecca Ferguson, Roman Lob, Der König tanzt |
| Episode 35 | 5 May 2012 | €2.0M | Peter Grünberg (43, pediatrician) | 39–66 | 14 | Raab | 00:50 | Mandy Capristo, Jason Mraz, Amy Macdonald |
| Episode 36 | 22 September 2012 | €2.5M | Manuela Kurrat (30, detective superintendent) | 34–71 | 14 | Raab | 01:38 | Lena, Joss Stone, Gossip |
| Episode 37 | 17 November 2012 | €3.0M | Mario Anastasopoulos (44, joiner) | 23–68 | 13 | Raab | 00:59 | Lana Del Rey, Die Fantastischen Vier, Udo Lindenberg |
| Episode 38 | 15 December 2012 | €3.5M | Bernd Stadelmann (27, farmer) | 70–50 | 15 | contestant | 00:58 | Taylor Swift, Deichkind, Seeed |
| Episode 39 | 12 January 2013 | €0.5M | Björn Schmitz (37, sport scientist) | 32–73 | 14 | Raab | 01:31 | Xavas, Ellie Goulding, Max Raabe |
| Episode 40 | 16 March 2013 | €1.0M | Andreas Mai (32, physicist) | 21–70 | 13 | Raab | 00:43 | Robbie Williams, Lena, Leslie Clio |
| Episode 41 | 11 May 2013 | €1.5M | André Bergermann (37, steelworker) | 40–65 | 14 | Raab | 01:03 | Gentleman, Hurts, Zaz |
| Episode 42 | 7 September 2013 | €2.0M | Pio Suh (38, lawyer) | 29–62 | 13 | Raab | 00:45 | Birdy, Ivy Quainoo, Miley Cyrus |
| Episode 43 | 16 November 2013 | €2.5M | David Fritsch (32, detective superintendent) | 6–72 | 12 | Raab | 00:43 | Katy Perry, Eminem, Adel Tawil |
| Episode 44 | 21 December 2013 | €3.0M | Anish Pulickal (32, social worker) | 64–56 | 15 | contestant | 01:54 | Placebo, Casper, Thomas D |
| Episode 45 | 15 February 2014 | €0.5M | Michael Jentzsch (38, teacher) | 18–73 | 13 | Raab | 00:44 | Lorde, Christoph Maria Herbst, Marteria |
| Episode 46 | 29 March 2014 | €1.0M | Caroline Gessner (25, Bundeswehr officer) | 17–61 | 12 | Raab | 00:36 | Bastille, Clean Bandit |
| Episode 47 | 3 May 2014 | €1.5M | Maximilian Heizmann (31, ranger) | 21–70 | 13 | Raab | 00:37 | Lily Allen, Mando Diao |
| Episode 48 | 13 September 2014 | €2.0M | Liane Weber (28, fitness trainer) | 37–68 | 14 | Raab | 01:16 | Maroon 5, Kiesza |
| Episode 49 | 15 November 2014 | €2.5M | Peter Meiners (34, media analyst) | 74–46 | 15 | contestant | 02:23 | Die Fantastischen Vier, The Script |
| Episode 50 | 20 December 2014 | €0.5M | Jenna Timm (25, detective) | 13–65 | 12 | Raab | 00:58 | Cro, Zaz, Charley Ann Schmutzler |
| Episode 51 | 10 January 2015 | €1.0M | Jan-Marco Montag (31, student) | 31–74 | 14 | Raab | 01:36 | Herbert Grönemeyer, Ella Henderson |
| Episode 52 | 25 April 2015 | €1.5M | Maria Kleinebrahm (27, doctor) | 61–59 | 15 | contestant | 01:24 | Stefanie Heinzmann, Ann Sophie |
| Episode 53 | 12 September 2015 | €0.5M | Robert Klauß (30, PE teacher, football coach) | 18–73 | 13 | Raab | 01:13 | Joss Stone, Sido ft. Andreas Bourani |
| Episode 54 | 24 October 2015 | €1.0M | Markus Schulz (32, precision mechanic) | 34–71 | 14 | Raab | 01:17 | Louane Emera, Lena, Justin Bieber |
| Episode 55 | 19 December 2015 | €1.5M | 15 persons from the audience | - | 15 | - | 01:55 | Stefan Raab & the Heavytones |

== Related series ==
Three other series have been created with the same format as Schlag den Raab:

- Schlag den Star
- Schlag den Henssler
- Schlag den Besten

== International versions ==
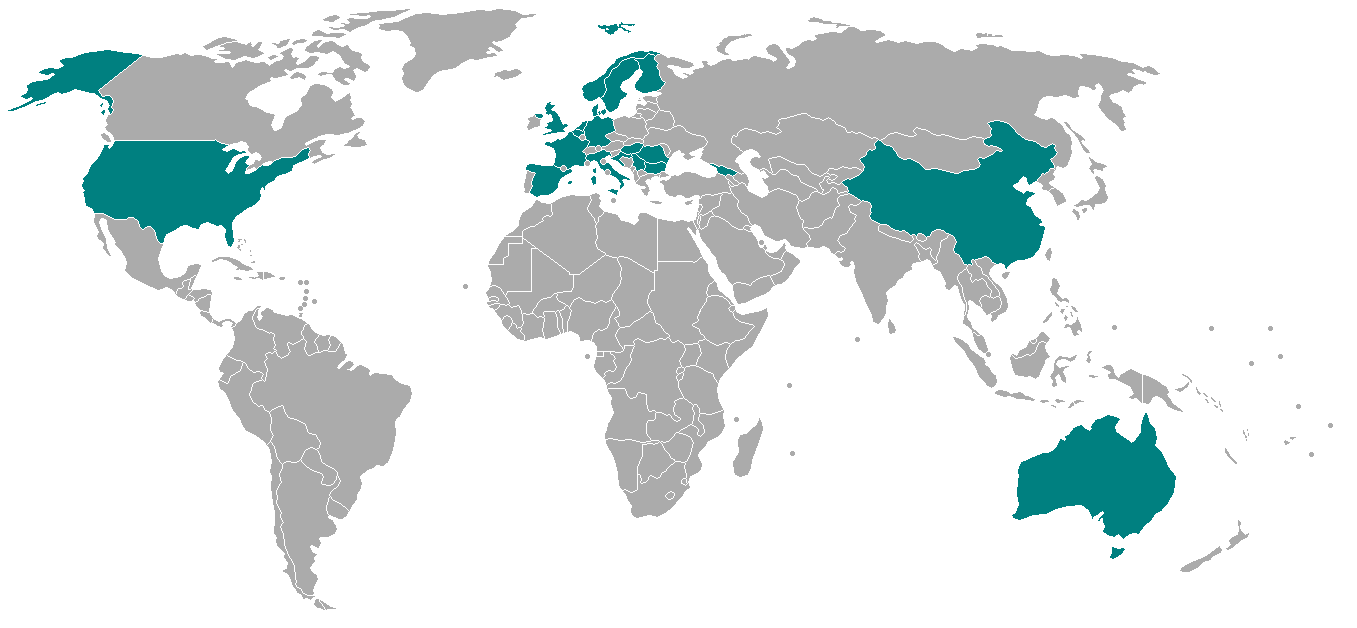
Schlag den Raab has been sold to these countries.

| Country | Title | Network | Host | Competing against | Games | Date aired |
|---|---|---|---|---|---|---|
| Arab World | إغلب السقا; Eghleb El-Saqqa | MBC | Razan Moughrabi | Ahmed El Sakka | 6 | 24 April 2020 |
| Australia | Beat the Star | Seven Network | Daniel MacPherson | Changed weekly | 8 | 7 September 2010 |
| Bulgaria | Разбий Иван и Андрей; Razbii Ivan i Andrei | Nova Television | Ivan and Andrey | Ivan and Andrey | 11 | 26 September 2011 |
| Croatia | Pobijedi Šolu | RTL Televizija | Belma Hodžic | Vlado Šola | 15 | 20 February 2009 |
| France | Qui peut battre Benjamin Castaldi? | TF1 | Carole Rousseau and Denis Brognart | Benjamin Castaldi | 13 | 29 November 2008 |
| Georgia | დაამარცხე ვარსკვლავი Daamartskhe Varskvlavi | Rustavi 2 | Ann Korkia | Unknown | Unknown | 14 June 2010 |
| Netherlands | Beat De Mol | Veronica TV | Johnny De Mol | Various | Unknown | 9 November 2010 |
| Norway | Hvem kan slå Ylvis; Hvem kan slå Aamodt og Kjus | TV Norge | Frithjof Wilborn (1st edition); Henriette Bruusgaard; Pia Lykke (2nd edition) | Ylvis brothers Kjetil André Aamodt & Lasse Kjus | Unknown | 2009; 2010 |
| Serbia | Izađi na crtu | Prva | Srđan Karanović | Milan Kalinić | 15 | 25 September 2011 |
| Sweden | Vem kan slå Filip och Fredrik? | Kanal 5 | Pontus Gårdinger | Filip and Fredrik | 15 | 9 September 2008 |
| Ukraine | Побий ведучого Pobij veduchogo | 1+1 | Ostap Stupka and Nikolay Vasilkov | Andrew Domanskiy | 4 | 27 May 2012 |
| United Kingdom | Beat the Star | ITV | Vernon Kay | Changed weekly | 8 | 20 April 2008 |

== Video games ==
Several video game adaptations of the show have been released for the Wii, PlayStation 3 and Microsoft Windows platforms in Germany since 10 September 2010, as numerous versions of a board game and a quiz. Schlag den Star, a game for the Nintendo Switch, was developed by Lost the Game Studios and published by bitComposer Games in Germany. The first edition for the Wii was a success in the German market.

== See also ==
- Beat the Star
- Beat the Star (Australia)
- Vem kan slå Filip & Fredrik (2008)
