= List of Beat the Star episodes =

Following is a list of Beat the Star episodes, from the British game show which aired on television network ITV for two series from 2008 to 2009.

== Episode list ==
– indicates the candidate won
– indicates the celebrity won

=== Series 1 (2008) ===
No. overall	No. in series	Celebrity	Winner	Prize	Original release date
Pilot	–	Iwan Thomas	Celebrity	–	Unbroadcast
1	1	Amir Khan	Celebrity	–	20 April 2008
2	2	Darren Gough	Candidate	£100,000	27 April 2008
3	3	Mark Foster	Celebrity	–	4 May 2008
4	4	Martin Offiah	Candidate	£100,000	11 May 2008
5	5	Kelvin Fletcher	Candidate	£50,000	18 May 2008
6	6	Greg Rusedski	Celebrity	–	25 May 2008
7	7	Martina Navratilova	Candidate	£100,000	1 June 2008
8	8	Vernon Kay (Note: Phillip Schofield took over hosting duties for this show.)	Celebrity	–	22 June 2008

=== Series 2 (2009) ===
No. overall	No. in series	Celebrity	Winner	Prize	Original release date
9	1	Austin Healey	Celebrity	–	19 April 2009
10	2	Martina Hingis	Candidate	£50,000	26 April 2009
11	3	Jack Osbourne	Candidate	£50,000	3 May 2009
12	4	James DeGale	Celebrity	–	10 May 2009
13	5	Rebecca Romero	Candidate	£50,000	17 May 2009
14	6	Andrew Castle	Celebrity	–	24 May 2009
15	7 (Note: Vernon Kay was the candidate for this episode, Phillip Schofield took over hosting duties.)	Joe Calzaghe	Celebrity	£150,000	31 May 2009

== Scores ==
Candidate	Celebrity
Series wins (1 drawn)
0	1
Episode wins (0 drawn)
7	9
