= Angel like You =

Angel(s) like You may refer to:

- "Angel like You", a song by Eli Young Band from the album 10,000 Towns, 2014
- "Angel like You", a song by Una Healy from the album The Waiting Game, 2017
- "Angels like You", 2020 song by Miley Cyrus
- "Angels like You", a 1963 song by American country singer Freddie Hart
