= The Whole 19 Yards =

British game show

- Genre: Game show
- Presented by: Vernon Kay
- Starring: Caroline Flack
- Voices of: Glenn Hugill
- Country of origin: United Kingdom
- Original language: English
- No. of series: 1
- No. of episodes: 8

Production
- Production location: Pinewood Studios
- Running time: 60 minutes (inc. adverts)
- Production company: Initial

Original release
- Network: ITV
- Release: 17 April – 5 June 2010

The Whole 19 Yards is a British game show that aired on ITV from 17 April to 5 June 2010, hosted by Vernon Kay and featuring Caroline Flack.

== Format ==
Four contestants compete through three rounds to answer general knowledge questions and complete physical challenges. In each round, they begin at one end of the stage, while the buzzers they must use to answer the questions are at the other end, 19 yards away. To reach the buzzers, they must traverse a challenge course that has been set up on the stage for that round.

Kay announces a category and begins to ask a series of questions. As soon as a contestant thinks they know the answer to a particular question, they start onto the course. The first contestant to hit their buzzer and answer their question correctly advances to the next round, while a miss passes control to the next contestant who reaches their buzzer. Each contestant may answer only the question on which they started the course. After a correct answer is given or everyone misses a question, the remaining contestants play the round again with a new category. On occasion, one or more complications ("twists") are added to these subsequent runs without the contestants being notified of them.

In each round, the last contestant who fails to answer a question is eliminated from the game and leaves with nothing. After the third round, the last remaining contestant plays for £100,000 in the "Final 19 Yards" challenge.

== Games ==
These are a list of games used so far in the series.

Key
First Round - Four Players
Second Round - Three Players
Third Round - Head to Head

Title	Information
Twin Peaks	Contestants must scale two mountain-style peaks using giant blocks; the buzzers are at the top of the second peak. The blocks to scale the first peak are already in place, but on the second, the contestants must place the blocks themselves to reach a black line across the top before climbing up.
A Walk in the Dark	The contestants are blindfolded throughout this round and cannot see the course. They must break through a paper wall, then cross three stations and crawl through a small hole in a circular wall at the end of each one. The first station has no obstacles, the second has pressure pads on the floor that trigger bursts of flame or dry-ice smoke, and the third has a slowly rotating turntable on its floor. Once past the final circular wall, they can hit the buzzer.
Lock and Key	The buzzers are padlocked shut, and the contestants must find keys in four stations to reach them: a bath of foam, a giant bowl of sawdust, a container of coloured gunge that pours down on the contestants, and a snowglobe-like container of sticky balls that the contestant must crawl into. Each of the first three stations contains the key to unlock the next one, and the fourth has the key for the buzzer. For Episode 3, the first two stations contained a blancmange/spaghetti mixture and confetti, respectively, for episode 5, those stations used blancmange/rice pudding and feathers.
Caught in the Net	Contestants must climb up a slope under a cargo net before scrambling through a second, circular net full of balloons, some filled with gunge. The buzzer is at the end of the second net.
Stick 'Em Up	Wearing Velcro suits, the contestants negotiate a series of Velcro obstacles designed to stick to them and hinder their progress. These include a strip curtain and crawls through a circular hole and tunnel. In addition, the floor is covered with Velcro tiles.
Power Trip	Contestants drive motorized chairs through a road race circuit. They must plug their vehicles into a charging station at the start of the course, drive to the other end, plug into a second station in order to charge the buzzer, then return to the start. A contestant may only hit their buzzer after completing three trips to it.
Knotting Hills	Wearing harnesses clipped to safety ropes, the contestants must scale two peaks, with the buzzers at the top of the second peak. Along the way, they must untie several pieces of cord that have been knotted around the rope so that it will pass through the harness clip, then unclip themselves from the rope before hitting the buzzer.
It's a Wrap!	The contestants' bodies are wrapped and their ankles are strapped together to prevent free movement of arms and legs. They must negotiate two sets of steps, a tunnel, and a hill before using their heads to hit the buzzer.

=== The Final 19 Yards ===
The buzzer is initially placed next to the contestant, mounted to a mobile platform on which Kay stands. A maximum of 5 questions are played during this round, each consisting of a category and a series of clues to an item within it. After Kay finishes reading the first clue, he and the buzzer begin to move slowly across the floor, while moving a different colour appears on the floor, the contestant must run and hit the buzzer as soon as they think they know the answer, stopping the movement. Each correct answer increases the contestant's winnings (£5,000, £10,000, £20,000, £50,000, £100,000). After each correct answer, the contestant may either end the game and keep the accumulated money, or continue and risk it on the next question. The contestant must begin at the original starting line on each new question, while Kay and the buzzer start to move from wherever they stopped on the previous one. An incorrect answer at any point ends the game and reduces the contestant's winnings to the level below that of the last correct answer they gave. If the buzzer moves a total of 19 yards, the game ends and they lose everything.

== International versions ==
- No longer airing
- Non-broadcast pilot

Country	Name	Host	Network	Date premiered	Prize
Austria	Powerplay - Ganze 17 Meter	Christian Clerici	ORF eins	September 2010	Voyage
Brazil	Sufoco	Fausto Silva	Rede Globo	April 2010	New car
Germany	17 Meter	Joko Winterscheidt and Klaas Heufer-Umlauf	ProSieben	June 2011	€25.000
Spain	Los últimos 20 metros	Óscar Martínez	Antena 3	July 2009	€50.000
United States	The Whole 19 Yards	Chris Hardwick	CBS	March 2009 (pilot rejected)	$50,000
