= 1000 Heartbeats =

British game show

- Genre: Game show
- Created by: Paul Farrer
- Presented by: Vernon Kay
- Starring: The Quartet; Sarah Chapman; Catriona Parker; Hayley Pomfrett; Llinos Richards; Paul Farrer (conductor)
- Voices of: Dilly Barlow
- Theme music composer: Paul Farrer
- Country of origin: United Kingdom
- Original language: English
- No. of series: 2
- No. of episodes: 55

Production
- Running time: 60 minutes (inc. adverts)
- Production company: Hungry Bear Media

Original release
- Network: ITV
- Release: 23 February 2015 – 15 January 2016

1000 Heartbeats is a 2015 British daytime game show that aired on ITV, hosted by Vernon Kay. It aired from 23 February 2015 to 15 January 2016. A reboot has been ordered, but more is yet to be confirmed.

== Format ==
Wearing an electronic heart-rate counter and standing on a lighted circular platform known as "The Plate," a single contestant answers questions in order to win money over a total of seven rounds. While a round is in progress, the contestant's heartbeats are continuously counted and deducted from an initial total of 1,000 (in Series 2, the count does not begin until the words "Play" are spoken) If the total reaches zero, the game ends immediately, the contestant is defeated and leaves empty-handed. During gameplay, the contestant's heart rate is displayed on a monitor and relayed to a live string quartet playing the show's musical score, in which Paul Farrer, the show's creator and composer, conducted it; they adjust their tempo (beats per minute) to match the heart rate and maximise tension.

The contestant must give seven correct answers to complete Round 1, and the required number decreases by one for each subsequent round (six in Round 2, five in Round 3, etc.). Each incorrect answer deducts 25 heartbeats. The contestant may change out a question by stepping off the Plate, at a cost of 100 beats (50 in Series 1). Any correct answers given prior to stepping off are counted toward the number required to complete each round once play resumes.

Each completed round increases the contestant's winnings to as follows:

- Round 1 – £250
- Round 2 – £500
- Round 3 – £1,000
- Round 4 – £2,500
- Round 5 – £5,000
- Round 6 – £10,000
- Round 7 – £25,000

At the start of each new round, the contestant is shown an example of the game to be played and may choose to "Cash Out" with the money banked to that point rather than play on. In order to win the money, they must complete one final "Cashout Round", which requires five consecutive true or false questions answered correctly.

== Games ==
Round 1 – £250

- Compare: The contestant is shown a single comparative question, followed by several pairs of answers, and must choose the answer from each pair that satisfies the question. Seven correct answers are required to advance. This game was added in Series 2.
- Contrast: The contestant is shown a single pair of answer options, followed by several statements. For each one, the contestant must choose the answer that satisfies it. Seven correct answers are required to advance.

Round 2 – £500

- Reflection: The contestant is shown an analogue clock that has been reflected horizontally and must correctly announce six different times to advance. This game was added in Series 2.
- Reorder: The contestant is shown a list of six items and must place them in a specified order to advance.
- Unravel: The contestant is shown a rotating circle of six, seven, eight or nine letters which spell out a word in the proper order. The contestant must find six words to advance.

Round 3 – £1,000

- Assemble: The contestant is shown a photograph of a celebrity for five seconds. The image then disappears and is replaced by a copy with five pieces missing and three intact. One hole is highlighted, and the contestant must choose the correct piece to fill it from 12 options. Some of the possible pieces may have been rotated from their original orientation, increasing the difficulty. The contestant must fill all five holes in order to advance.
- Definition: The contestant is shown a row of blanks corresponding to the number of letters in a word and the word's definition. One letter is given to start, and others fill in as time goes on. The contestant must guess five words to advance. This game was added in Series 2.
- Unscramble: The contestant must form five sets of scrambled letters into words that fit a given general category. The contestant can ask for one clue to narrow the category down, at a cost of 25 heartbeats.

Round 4 – £2,500

- Identify: The contestant is shown a statement and eight possible answers, and must choose the four that fit it. If the contestant's four choices are not all correct, they are penalised 25 heartbeats and told how many choices are correct, but not which ones. The contestant continues to guess until all four correct answers are found in one turn.
- Link: The contestant is shown two columns of six answers each and must complete four pairs as instructed, linking one item from each column to form the pairs.
- Deduction: The contestant is shown a statement and seven answer choices, and must choose the one answer that fits it. The answer is then removed from the list, and a new statement is given. The contestant must remove four correct answers. This game was discontinued in Series 2.

Round 5 – £5,000

- Keep Up: The contestant is shown an initial number and a mathematical calculation instruction, the result of which becomes the initial number for the next one. The contestant must complete three sequences of calculations to win the round (in Series 1, there are seven steps in the first sequence, eight in the second, and nine in the third; in Series 2, there are six steps each). The last calculation of each sequence returns back to the first initial number given.
- Pinpoint: The contestant is shown a grid of numbers and must perform calculations with them as instructed, with each correct response removing the affected numbers from the grid. The contestant must complete three grids (four calculations each) to advance.

Round 6 – £10,000

- Decipher: The contestant is shown a list of five statements, only one of which fits a given question, and must choose that one statement. The contestant must play through two lists in order to advance. The risk is that if the contestant does not play perfectly, he/she will lose 25 heartbeats for every wrong answer.

Round 7 – £25,000

- Recall: The contestant is shown an alphanumeric sequence of 11 characters and must recite it in exact order to win the round. The sequence remains on screen until the contestant says "recall". If a mistake is made, the contestant loses 25 heartbeats and the sequence is shown again.

Cashout

The contestant must correctly answer five consecutive true or false statements in order to keep the money in their bank. Each incorrect answer breaks the chain and deducts 25 heartbeats; the contestant cannot step off the Plate during this round.

A contestant who successfully cashes out at the £10,000 level may be given a chance to play Recall unofficially, using the remaining heartbeats on the counter, and see if they would have been able to win the full £25,000.

== Transmissions ==
Series	Start date	End date	Episodes
1	23 February 2015	27 March 2015	25
2	23 November 2015	15 January 2016	30

== International versions ==
Country	Local title	Channel	Presenter(s)	Air dates
Philippines	1000 Heartbeats: Pintig Pinoy	TV5; Viva; Sari-Sari Channel	Xian Lim and Chad Kinis	March 20 – June 12, 2021
