= Let's Get Gold =

- Created by: Sebastian Scott
- Presented by: Vernon Kay
- Judges: Rio Ferdinand; Freddie Flintoff; Una Healy; Martine McCutcheon
- Country of origin: United Kingdom
- Original language: English
- No. of series: 1
- No. of episodes: 3

Production
- Executive producer: Suzy Lamb
- Running time: 60 minutes (heats); 90 minutes (final)
- Production companies: Thames and Superhero TV

Original release
- Network: ITV
- Release: 5 July – 7 July 2012

Let's Get Gold is a British sports entertainment television series. It aired on ITV; consisting of three episodes and was hosted by Vernon Kay. It was announced on 11 June 2012, that Rio Ferdinand, Freddie Flintoff, Una Healy and Martine McCutcheon were to judge the show.

== Background ==
Over three shows, Let's Get Gold puts 15 sporting teams against each other as they attempt to transform their sport into the most spectacular and entertaining routine.

With a prize fund of £100,000 and judged by Rio, Una, Martine and Freddie; the show aims to find groups with the best technique and skill and creativity.

== Promotion ==
On 21 June 2012, host Vernon Kay spoke to Phillip and Holly on This Morning about the show. On 5 July 2012, judge Martine McCutcheon spoke to Lorraine Kelly on her breakfast show Lorraine.

== Format ==
The judging panel is split and vote at the end of each performance, awarding either a bronze, silver or gold. At the end of all the performances, the audience vote to send one team through to the final. No public vote takes place as the show is pre-recorded.
