= Una Healy =

Irish singer (born 1981)

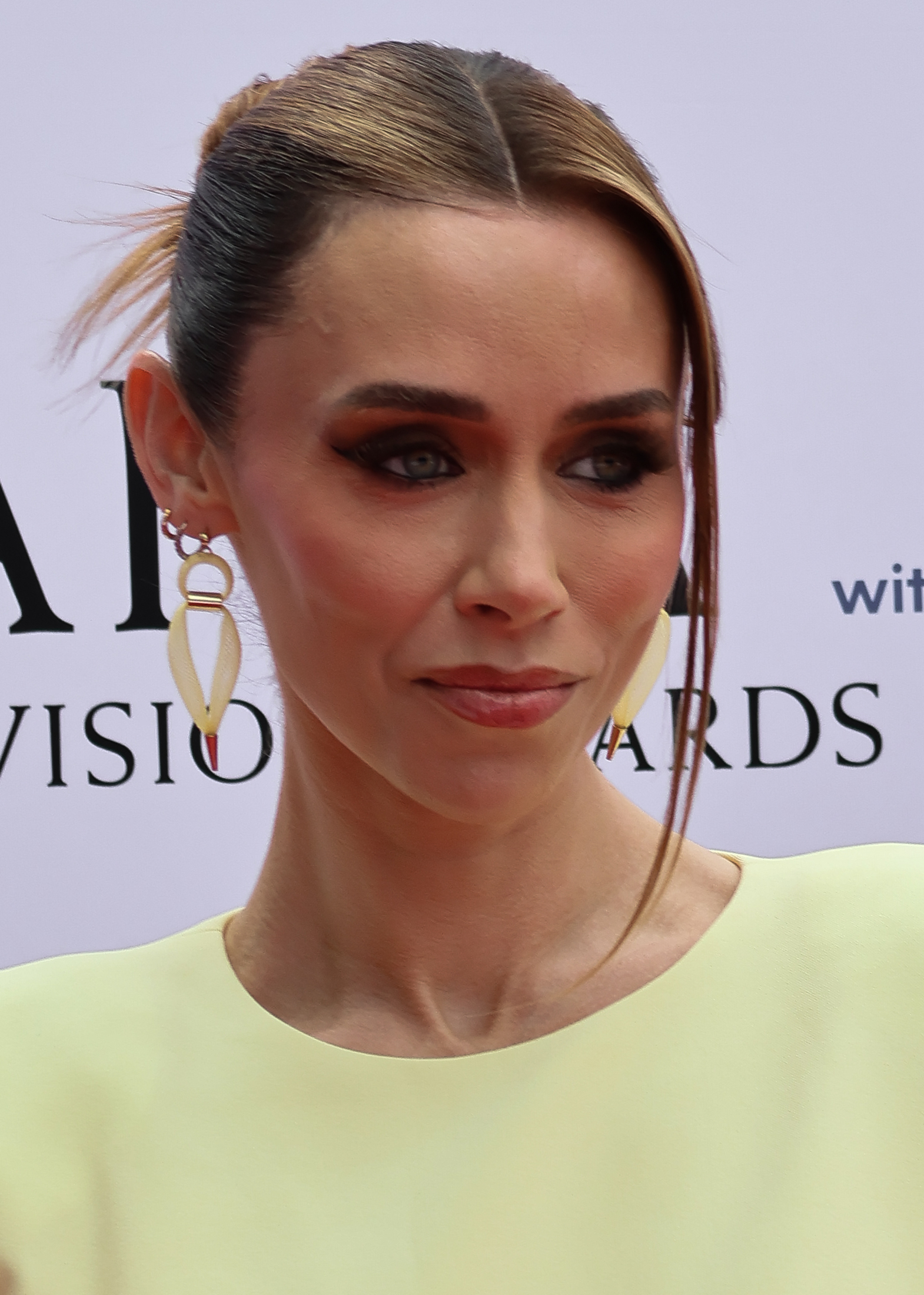
- Healy at the 2026 British Academy Television Awards
- Born: Una Theresa Imogene Healy; 10 October 1981 (age 45); Thurles, County Tipperary, Ireland
- Other name: Una Foden
- Spouse: Ben Foden (m. 2012; div. 2019)
- Children: 2
- Relatives: Declan Nerney (uncle); Paul Hession (cousin)
- Musical career
- Genre: Pop
- Occupations: Singer; dancer; television presenter
- Years active: 2004–present
- Labels: Polydor; Fascination; Decca
- Formerly of: The Saturdays
- Website: unahealy.com

Una Theresa Imogene Healy (born 10 October 1981) is an Irish singer. She rose to fame in 2008 as a member of five-piece girl group The Saturdays, who are signed to Fascination and Polydor Records.

The group later gained another record deal with Geffen Records after having huge success in the United Kingdom. Healy and the rest of the group then signed a deal with Island Def Jam Records and Mercury Records to distribute their music in the United States, which led to her first UK number one single, "What About Us". Healy previously attempted a solo career in 2006, when she released her first extended play, Sorry. Although the EP was not successful, one of the tracks from the EP was re-recorded and used for the B-side of the band's track "Higher".

The Saturdays have been inactive since the completion of their Greatest Hits Live! tour in 2014. Healy subsequently took on a number of television opportunities, including presenting Una's Dream Ticket, taking part in the second series of Splash! and becoming a judge on Let's Get Gold. She also became a judge on RTÉ's The Voice of Ireland where she remained on the judging panel for the fourth and fifth series; she was the winning mentor in her debut year (2015) with her act Patrick James, and placed third in the fifth season. While Healy was engaging in a television career she was also writing and recording her debut album, switching to a country music–influenced style as opposed to the pop and dance material performed by The Saturdays. Healy's album, The Waiting Game, was released in February 2017. She released a single "Never See Me Cry" in March 2018.

== Life and career ==
=== Early life and career beginnings ===
Healy was born on 10 October 1981 in Thurles, County Tipperary. She comes from a musical background and is the niece of country singer Declan Nerney. She has an elder sister, Deirdre, whom she calls "Dee". She is a cousin of Irish athlete Paul Hession. At the age of 13, Healy gave up swimming (she was an All-Ireland champion swimmer at nine) and decided to take up guitar, teaching herself to play using her mother's guitar, and from then on began to write songs of her own. After finishing school at 18, she decided to take a year out and worked as a medical secretary. She went on to study nursing and then primary teaching at Mary Immaculate College, but finally decided to pursue her music passion at 23 years old.

Healy began her music career playing guitar and singing in pubs and clubs around Ireland, solo and in bands. She won Ireland's Glinsk Song Contest in both 2004 and 2006. She represented Ireland at the Eurovision Song Contest 2006 as a backing singer for Brian Kennedy on "Every Song Is a Cry for Love". Whilst Healy was slowly finding success in her native Ireland as an indie solo artist, she felt she did not have a firm direction in her career. In mid-2006, she recorded and released her first extended play, entitled Sorry, from which the track "Had It with Today" was re-recorded as the B-side of the Saturdays' single "Higher", which she self-produced. The album includes the songs "So Long", "Raider of My Sleep" and "I Love You".

In 2007, Healy – still struggling to find major success – flew to London to gain more exposure and experience as a performer, then landed an audition for The Saturdays, which was her first audition for a major label and her first abroad. In 2008, Healy wrote, produced and performed on the soundtrack to Christian Blake, written and directed by Eoin Macken. The music can be heard throughout the duration of the film; however, the soundtrack was never officially released. Tracks include "Don't Leave Me Alone" and "Drops of Rain". "Don't Leave Me Alone" was the leading track from the soundtrack and the music video can still be found on YouTube.

=== 2007–2014: The Saturdays ===
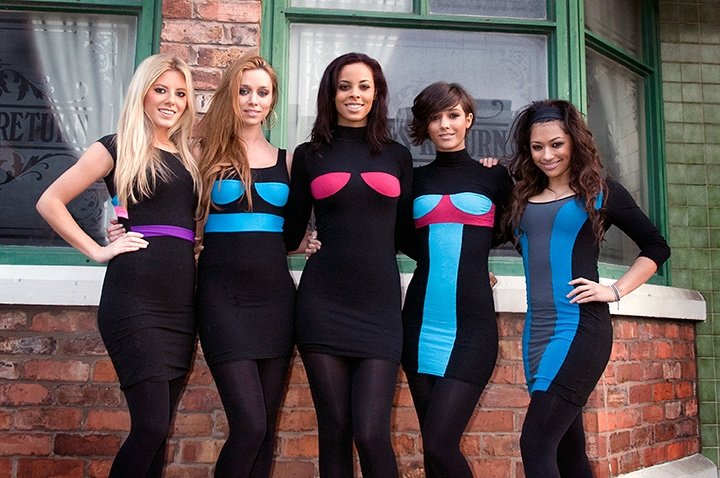
The Saturdays, from left to right: Mollie King, Healy, Rochelle Humes, Frankie Bridge and Vanessa White, on the set of Coronation Street in April 2009.

Healy was a member of the Saturdays, a girl group, from 2007 until 2014. The group achieved thirteen Top 10 hits and four Top 10 albums. The girl group released their debut single "If This Is Love" in July 2008, and it peaked at number eight in the UK. The group released a second single "Up" which charted at number five in the UK and later the song was given a Silver Disc in the United Kingdom. In late October 2008, the group released their first studio album Chasing Lights. It charted at number nine in the UK, and went platinum according to the BPI. The band released a third single from the album, "Issues", which also went silver. The Saturdays released a cover of "Just Can't Get Enough" by Depeche Mode. The song debuted at number two in the UK, behind Flo Rida's "Right Round". The fifth and final single from the album was "Work", which was the first single by the group to fail to reach the top 20.

The group later went on a tour titled The Work Tour. In October 2009, the group released a second studio album, Wordshaker, which charted at number nine and was given a silver certification by the BPI. The first single, "Forever Is Over", charted at number two in the UK. The Saturdays appeared in advertisements for several products including a brand of deodorant, tampons, mobile phones, an operating system, and hair removal products. But in early 2010, the girls released a second and final single from their second album, "Ego", which charted at number nine, the single gained a certification of silver by the BPI.

In summer 2010, the Saturdays released their first mini album (their third album overall) Headlines!, which charted at number 3 in the UK and number 10 in Ireland. The band released their eighth single, "Missing You", which charted at number three in the UK and number six in Ireland. Rochelle Wiseman confirmed that the second single from the album would be "Higher" It was later confirmed, by the band's official website that Flo Rida had recorded vocals for "Higher". On Your Radar was the girls' third studio album, reaching a disappointing number 23 in the UK and spending only three weeks in the UK Top 75, but featured the top ten hits "All Fired Up" and "Notorious", as well as another single, "My Heart Takes Over". In December 2011, the group went on their first headlining arena tour, the All Fired Up Tour!. The band released their first single taken from their fourth studio album "30 Days" in May 2012, which peaked at number seven. Later in the year, they temporarily moved from London to Los Angeles in hope to break America. Helping increase their single sales in America, E! Network broadcast Chasing The Saturdays, a reality TV show following the girls during their three-month stay in America. The show premiered in January 2013, and was cancelled after one series. The band released "What About Us" (featuring rapper Sean Paul) in March 2013, which became their first number one single and was the biggest selling single of the year (at that point). Later on in the year, "Gentleman" and "Disco Love" were released; with both of them charting in the top 15. Their album Living for the Weekend became the band's fourth top ten album. The final single taken from the album was a fan favourite. The radio mix of "Not Giving Up" was released in April 2014 and was their seventeenth top 40 single. The band went on hiatus in 2014, and released a greatest hits album Finest Selection: The Greatest Hits the same year. The only single released from the album, "What Are You Waiting For?" charted at number thirty-seven, making it their lowest-charting single to date.

=== 2014–2017: The Voice of Ireland and The Waiting Game ===
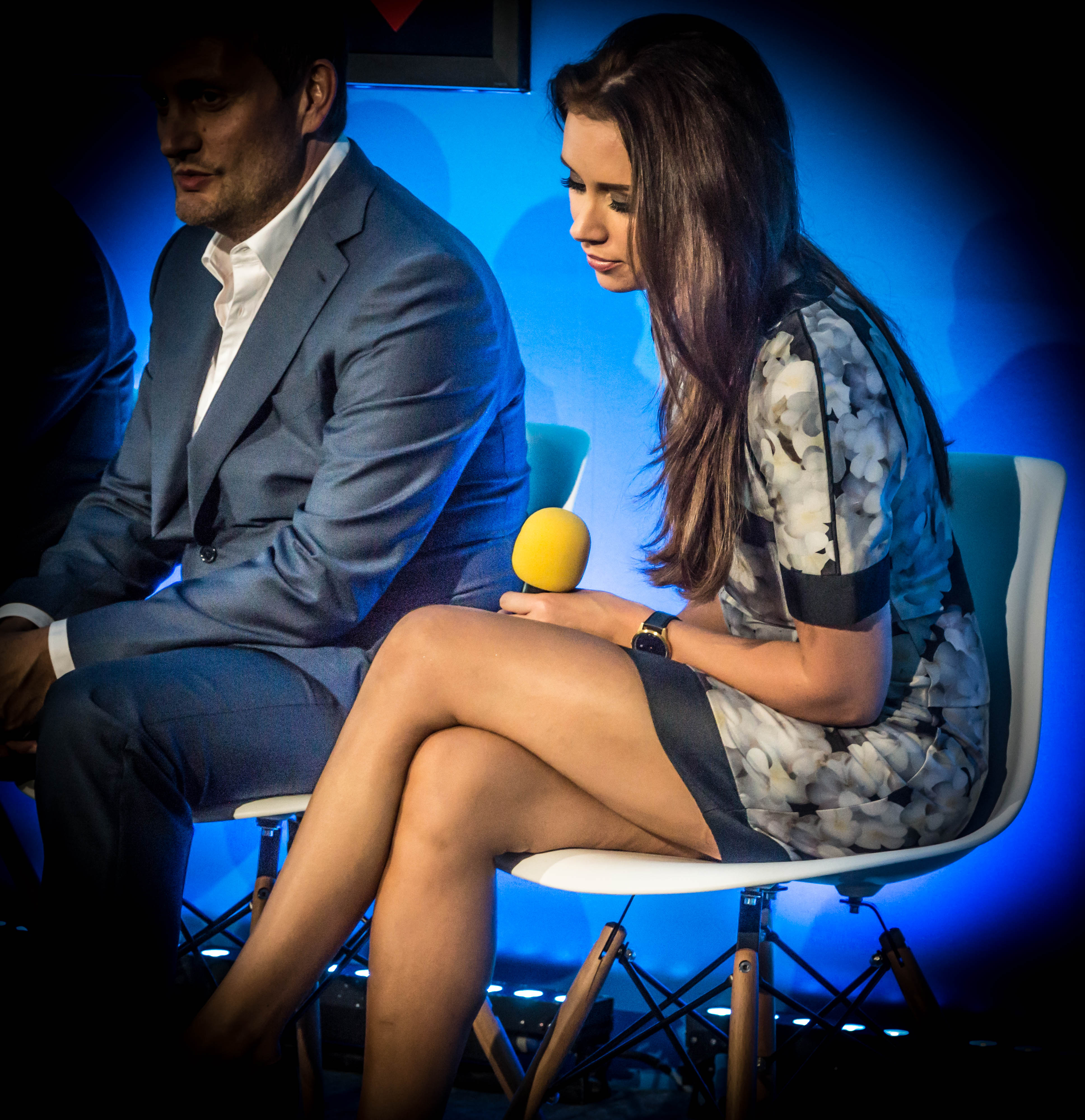
Una Healy at RTÉ Winter Season Launch in August 2015

Healy's first solo endeavour away from the group was when RTÉ selected her to present her own television programme, titled Una's Dream Ticket. The programme was not renewed for a follow-up season. Healy was also drafted in to become a judge on sport reality television competition Let's Get Gold Healy was on the judging panel alongside Martine McCutcheon, Andrew Flintoff and Rio Ferdinand. During the show fifteen sporting teams go against one another as they attempt to transform their sport into the most spectacular, entertaining and inspiring routine. The winners of the show would receive a grand prize of £100,000, with Healy's aim as a judge is to find groups with the best technique and skill and creativity. The programme experienced poor ratings and therefore was not renewed for a second season. In 2014, Healy was announced as a contestant on the second series of UK version of diving competition, Splash!. Healy's involvement gained some criticism due to Healy previously having experience in swimming and diving, due to Healy being an All Ireland champion swimmer at the age of nine. Despite this, Healy was eliminated twelfth and placed eighth overall in the competition.

In June 2014, Healy hosted the first ever Irish version of Pride of Britain Awards. Healy said she was "overwhelmed" by all of the stories and it was tough choosing between such worthy contenders. Healy said "I’d love to give everyone who entered an award. It’s such an honour to be host and a part of this. I’ve attended the Pride of Britain three times with the girls so I know what it’s all about. I think it’s amazing that it has come to Ireland.” Despite this, Healy began writing her solo debut album. Healy began heavy writing sessions during the Greatest Hits Live! tour with the Saturdays, for she knew the band were going on hiatus. She said that her children inspired her in many different ways creatively when she began to write the album, and that she wanted to continue to record and perform music to help support them in the life they deserved. She said she wrote "Stare at the Moon" about her eldest child, Aoife Belle, for she knew all the words to the band's songs.

It was reported in early 2016 that Healy had recorded a track with Nashville star Sam Palladio. It was also announced that she had been working with Sacha Skarbek, Amy Wadge and Ben Earle from country music duo The Shires. Healy later performed "Perfect" with Kelly Mongan on the second series of The Voice of Ireland. In 2014, Reebok announced that they were teaming up with Healy to launch a Women's Fitness Collection. When performing on the second series of The Voice of Ireland, Healy impressed producers and fans. This led to Healy being asked to become a judge on the fourth series of the show starting in January 2015, alongside Kian Egan, Bressie and Rachel Stevens. In April 2016, Healy revealed her album would be influenced by country and indie-inspired music, and "Staring At the Moon", the song she wrote for her daughter would be performed live on the semi-final of The Voice of Ireland. Healy was the winning judge on the fourth series of The Voice of Ireland when the act she mentored, Patrick James, won the show. Healy returned to The Voice of Ireland to judge the fifth series of the show. Nigel Connell was the last member of Team Una to be in the competition where he placed third. In August 2016, Healy confirmed she had signed a solo deal with Decca, with the intention of releasing a solo album in 2016. However, In October 2016, Healy announced that her debut album would not be realised until 2017. In late 2016, Healy announced the record to be titled The Waiting Game. Healy said that album's title came from waiting to record her own solo record since she was eight years old. She also revealed that she co-wrote the full album and it was nice to get back to her "roots" of songwriting. Healy released the lead single from her debut album, "Stay My Love", in January 2017. The single was a collaboration with Sam Palladio, which had been reported previously. The music video for the song was directed by Urban Strom. Healy also took part in the "Forever Country Covers Series", which celebrated the 50th anniversary of the Country Music Association Awards. She performed "Forever and Ever, Amen", originally a hit for CMA winner Randy Travis. The Waiting Game was released in February 2017. She performed at Europe's largest country music festival, C2C: Country to Country, in both 2017 and 2018, opening for country legend Reba McEntire in Dublin on 12 March. In January 2018, Healy participated in And They're Off! in aid of Sport Relief.

=== 2018–present: Continued recording and radio hosting ===
In March 2018, she released a brand-new single titled "Never See Me Cry". In April, Healy unveiled her first shoewear collection 'Una Healy Original', available in over 100 stores throughout the UK and Ireland with a dedicated online store. The shoe range was decided and developed by Healy herself in collaboration with a team of industry professionals. In March 2020, Healy released her new single, "Strangers". In April 2019, Healy announced via her Instagram that she had joined the Bauer Media's Country Hits Radio (now called Absolute Radio Country) team, hosting the Breakfast Show on a Saturday morning. In 2020, Healy was part of an Irish collective of female singers and musicians called "Irish Women in Harmony", that recorded a version of Dreams in aid of the charity SafeIreland, which deals with domestic abuse; such abuse reportedly had risen significantly during the COVID-19 lockdown. She has also hosted an evening talk show, The 6 O'Clock Show in Ireland. In 2021 she co-hosted an Irish music show on RTÉ One, The Heart of Saturday Night, with Loah.

In June 2023, Healy released "Walk Away", saying that the song "is about having the courage to walk away from any relationship or situation that no longer serves you, to do it in style and to find the courage to move on to something better. Throughout the song, there is a play on words that keep it humorous and upbeat."

== Personal life ==
Healy married rugby union fullback Ben Foden on 30 June 2012 in her native Ireland. They have two children. In July 2018, it was announced that Healy and Foden had separated.

Healy won "Hottest Female 2009" in the Virgin Media Music Awards. She appeared in the January 2010 edition of FHM along with the other members of the Saturdays. She was ranked number 19 and number 41 in FHM's Sexiest Women poll in 2010 and 2011, respectively. In FHM's 2012 poll, she had dropped down to 66th place. Healy previously ran her own blog where she spoke about family life, The Saturdays and herself.

== Discography ==
=== Studio albums ===
Title	Album details	Peak chart positions		
Title	Album details	IRE	UK	SCO
The Waiting Game	Released: 10 February 2017; Label: Decca Records; Formats: CD, digital download	12	28	13

=== Extended plays ===
Title	Details
Sorry	Release date: 18 August 2006; Label: Independent; Formats: CD, Digital download
Beating Heart	Release date: 24 April 2026; Label: 10/10 Records

=== Singles ===
==== As lead artist ====
Year	Title	Peak chart positions			Album
Year	Title	IRE	UK	SCO	Album
2017	"Stay My Love" (with Sam Palladio)	—	—	56	The Waiting Game
2017	"Battlelines"	—	—	—	The Waiting Game
2018	"Never See Me Cry"	—	—	—	Non-album singles
2019	"Strangers"	—	—	—	Non-album singles
2019	"Wild Grasses"	—	—	65	Non-album singles
2020	"Until You"	—	—	—	Non-album singles
2021	"Swear It All Again"	—	—	—	Non-album singles
2022	"This Is Your Life"	—	—	—	Non-album singles
2023	"Walk Away"	—	—	—	Non-album singles

==== As featured artist ====
Year	Title	Peak chart positions			Album
Year	Title	IRE	UK	SCO	Album
2017	"In Case You Didn't Know" (Brett Young featuring Una Healy)	—	—	—	—
2018	"With a Little Help from My Friends" (as part of NHS Voices)	—	89	26	—
2018	"Take Me Dancing" (Jake Carter featuring Una Healy)	—	—	—	—
2019	"I'm Not Me Without You" (Keywest featuring Una Healy)	—	—	—	Ordinary Superhero
2021	"Song of the Summer" (with Tebey)	—	—	—	

===== Promotional singles =====
Year	Title
2019	"Set You Free"

== Videography ==
Music Videos
Year	Title	Director	Album
2017	"Stay My Love"	Urban Strom	The Waiting Game
2017	Battlelines	Oscar Sansom	The Waiting Game
2018	Never See Me Cry	Jordan Rossi	N/A
2019	Wild Grasses		N/A
2021	Swear It All Again		N/A
2022	This Is Your Life		N/A
2023	Walk Away	Arthur Gourounlian	N/A
