= The Voice of Ireland series 4 =

The Voice of Ireland
- Series 4
- Coaches: Bressie; Rachel Stevens; Kian Egan; Una Foden
- Winner: Patrick Donoghue
- Winning coach: Una Foden
- Runner-up: Emma Humber
- Finals venue: The Helix

Release
- Original network: RTÉ One; RTÉ Two
- Original release: 4 January – 26 April 2015

Series chronology
- ← Previous; Series 3 Next → Series 5

The Voice of Ireland is an Irish reality talent show. The fourth series of the programme premiered on 4 January 2015 on RTÉ One and concluded on 26 April, similar to previous seasons. Kathryn Thomas returned as main host, while her colleague Eoghan McDermott remained the show's co-host. Television personalities Bressie and Kian Egan both returned as coaches, while The Saturdays singer Una Healy and S Club 7 star Rachel Stevens filled the remaining two positions. Screentime Shinawil Productions continued to produce the talent programme.

Patrick Donoghue was crowned the winner on 26 April 2015, with his version of Jessie J's Mama Knows Best, which was later released on iTunes. He was coached by The Saturdays singer Una Healy. After winning the recording contract with Universal, Donoghue decided to change his stage name to Patrick James as he found it represented him more as an artist.

== Teams ==
Colour key

Winner
Runner-up
Third place
Fourth place
Eliminated in the Live shows
Eliminated in the Knockouts (live)
Artist was stolen by another coach (Name is struck through)
Eliminated in the Battles
Artist withdrew from the competition

Coaches	Top 56			
Una Foden				
Una Foden	Patrick Donoghue	John Sheehy	Niall O'Halloran	Kelley McArdle
Una Foden	Evan Cotter	Nicola Lynch	Chloe Wilders	Shauna Nolan
Una Foden	Kathleen Mahon	Mark Joyce	Rachel Murphy	Sinead Hansard
Una Foden	~~Pat Fitz~~	~~Kayleigh Cullinan~~	~~Shannon Doyle~~	~~Kieran McKillop~~
Kian Egan				
Kian Egan	John Bonham	Helena Bradley Bates	Fionn Gardner	Caoin Fitz
Kian Egan	Ciara Monaghan	Pat Fitz	Kate Purcell	Chris Brady
Kian Egan	Colm Conlon	Jo Petit	Stuart Bond	Karla Chubb
Kian Egan	Rebecca Kelly	Adam Cummins	~~Kathleen Mahon~~	~~Sasha Sangari Smith~~
Rachel Stevens				
Rachel Stevens	Sarah McTernan	Kieran McKillop	Patrick Kennedy	Amy Hansard
Rachel Stevens	Gemma Lomar	Cian O'Melia	Paul Taylor	Ellie-May Bopp
Rachel Stevens	Shannon Doyle	Brian Dunne	Malcolm Urquhart	Cristin Nolan
Rachel Stevens	Leanne Power	Ronan O’Healy	Tara Gannon	~~Caoin Fitz~~
Bressie				
Bressie	Emma Humber	Denise Morgan	Kayleigh Cullinan	John O'Grady
Bressie	Ashley Loftus	Laura Enright	Ken Murphy	Dean Forrester
Bressie	Sasha Sangari Smith	Hannah Stockwell-Quinn	Catherine Hughes	Russell Hogg
Bressie	Kenneth Usher	Aoife Smith	Jolene Burns	~~Chloe Wilders~~
Stolen artists are italicized.

== Blind Auditions ==
The Blind Auditions for The Voice were filmed in The Helix on 15, 16 and 17 October 2014. They were broadcast from 4 January to 15 February, across seven episodes. This series, each coach had to choose 14 contestants to continue to the battle stage.

=== Blind Auditions 1 ===
Order	Artist	Song	Coach's and contestant's choices			
Order	Artist	Song	Bressie	Rachel	Kian	Una
1	Patrick Donoghue	"Red"	✔	✔	✔	✔
2	John McCormack	"Dance the Night Away"				
3	Kelley McArdle	"Everything in Between"		✔	✔	✔
4	Ronan O'Healy	"The Lazy Song"		✔		
5	Aisling Cully	"Sweet Nothing"				
6	John Sheehy	"Bette Davis Eyes"		✔	✔	✔
7	Colm Conlan	"Sedated"			✔	
8	Megan Ring	"Ironic"				
9	Sarah McTernan	"Who You Are"	✔	✔	✔	✔
10	James Berminghan	"Ain't No Stoppin' Us Now"				
11	Jolene Burns	"Prayer in C"	✔			
12	Sasha Hatam Smith	"Burn"		✔	✔	

=== Blind Auditions 2 ===
Order	Artist	Song	Coach's and contestant's choices			
Order	Artist	Song	Bressie	Rachel	Kian	Una
1	Shannon Doyle	"Big Girls Don't Cry"		✔		✔
2	Helena Bradley Bates	"Alone"		✔	✔	✔
3	Laura Enright	"Hey Ya"	✔	✔	✔	✔
4	Eddie Carey	"Love Grows (Where My Rosemary Goes)"				
5	Cian O'Melia	"Way Back When"		✔	✔	
6	Brían Doyle	"Sing"				
7	Mikaela Bonner	"Pumped Up Kicks"				
8	Brian Dunne	"My Love"		✔		
9	Denise Morgan	"If You Love Me Say You Love Me"	✔	✔	✔	✔
10	Aoife Cremin	"Still into You"				
11	Miranda Thornton	"Can't Rely on You"				
12	Dean Forrester	"Jump"	✔			

=== Blind Auditions 3 ===
Order	Artist	Song	Coach's and contestant's choices			
Order	Artist	Song	Bressie	Rachel	Kian	Una
1	Pat Fitz	"Higher and Higher"				✔
2	Ryan Hegarty	"Fisherman's Blues"				
3	Aoife Smith	"Mr. Brightside"	✔			
4	Tara Gannon	"Let's Stay Together"		✔		
5	Nicole Campbell	"All the Man I Need"				
6	Kenneth Usher	"Autumn Leaves"	✔	✔	✔	
7	Leanne Power	"Dark Horse"		✔		
8	Orly Delos Santos	"Smooth"				
9	Kayleigh Cullinan	"How Will I Know"	✔	✔	✔	✔
10	Danny Fitzpatrck	"A Sky Full of Stars"				
11	Jo Petit	"Georgia on My Mind"			✔	✔
12	Fabia Masella	"The One That Got Away"				
13	Stuart Bond	"Feeling Good"		✔	✔	✔

=== Blind Auditions 4 ===
Order	Artist	Song	Coach's and contestant's choices			
Order	Artist	Song	Bressie	Rachel	Kian	Una
1	Chris Brady	"Make You Feel My Love"		✔	✔	✔
2	Luke Dunleavy	"You & I"				
3	John O'Grady	"Crosstown Traffic"	✔	✔	✔	✔
4	Khanyah Majiba	"Rock With You"				
5	Nicola Lynch	"Umbrella"		✔		✔
6	Russell Hogg	"Devil in the Girl"	✔			
7	Ellie-May Bopp	"My Favourite Game"		✔		✔
8	Chloe Donnellan	"Dog Days Are Over"				
9	Sonia Traynor	"Everytime"				
10	Karla Chubb	"Video Games"			✔	
11	Mike Staunton	"Lets Stay Together"				
12	Rachel Murphy	"Chandelier"		✔		✔
13	Adam Cummins	"Last Request"		✔	✔	✔

=== Blind Auditions 5 ===
Order	Artist	Song	Coach's and contestant's choices			
Order	Artist	Song	Bressie	Rachel	Kian	Una
1	Ashley Loftus	"The Blower's Daughter"	✔	✔	✔	✔
2	Elaine Ryan	"New York"				
3	Paddy Kennedy	"Candy"		✔	✔	✔
4	Cheryl McCullagh	"Because The Night"				
5	Malcolm Urquhart	"Baba O'Riley"		✔		
6	Sinead Hansard	"Waves"				✔
7	Korey Power	"Rude"				
8	Amy Hansard	"Problem"	✔	✔		
9	Finbarr Humphries	"The Man"				
10	Emma Humber	"This Woman's Work"	✔	✔	✔	
11	Aimee Canavan	"Ghost"				
12	Kate Purcell	"We Found Love"		✔	✔	
13	Niall O'Halloran	"Lay Me Down"	✔	✔	✔	✔

=== Blind Auditions 6 ===
Order	Artist	Song	Coach's and contestant's choices			
Order	Artist	Song	Bressie	Rachel	Kian	Una
1	Mary Porter	"Sexy and I know it"				
2	Kathleen Mahon	"Folsom Prison Blues"		✔	✔	
3	Catherine Hughes	"Demons"	✔	✔	✔	✔
4	Ciara Monaghan	"From Eden"			✔	
5	Graham John	"Chocolate"				
6	Kieran McKillop	"I Want It That Way"			✔	✔
7	Caoin Fitz	"Budapest"		✔	✔	
8	Precious Okpaje	"Lost"				
9	Jayde Stanley	"Me & My Broken Heart"				
10	Ken Murphy	"Kiss"	✔	✔	✔	
11	Cristin Nolan	"Telescope"		✔		
12	Annie Powderly	"It's Good To Be Alive"				
13	Gemma Lomax	"Ugly Heart"		✔		
13	Shauna Nolan	"Love on Top"/"I Want You Back"	✔	✔		✔

=== Blind Auditions 7 ===
Order	Artist	Song	Coach's and contestant's choices			
Order	Artist	Song	Bressie	Rachel	Kian	Una
1	Evan Cotter	"St Brendan's Voyage"				✔
2	Doireann Learmont	"Little Talks"				
3	John Bonham	"Immigrant Song"	✔	✔	✔	✔
4	Rebecca Kelly	"Don't Know Why"			✔	
5	Sean McGrath	"Amnesia"				
6	Hannah Stockwell-Quinn	"To Be With You"	✔	✔	✔	✔
7	Fionn Gardner	"High Hopes"	✔	✔	✔	
8	Chloe Wilders	"I Won't Give Up"	✔		—N/a	
9	Paul Taylor	"This Year's Love"	—N/a	✔	—N/a	
10	Sionan Murphy	"Black Roses"	—N/a	—N/a	—N/a	
11	Mark Joyce	"Last Request"	—N/a	—N/a	—N/a	✔
12	Chloe Murphy	"Warwick Avenue"	—N/a	—N/a	—N/a	—N/a

=== RTÉ 2fm Wildcards ===
The successful Wildcard format continued on the show. This gave singers a final opportunity to apply if they missed the application deadline. RTÉ 2FM presenters filtered the acts to find the best 5 possible contenders and they were invited to return for a blind audition with the coaches. The 2014 winner Brendan McCahey was a wildcard act, proving it to be successful.

Order	Artist	Coach's and contestant's choices
1	Colm Conlan	Team Kian
2	Aoife Cremin	Eliminated
3	Leanne Power	Team Rachel
4	Ellie-May Bopp	Team Rachel
5	Niall O'Halloran	Team Una
6	Ciara Monaghan	Team Kian

== The Battles ==
The Battles were filmed in The Helix on 22 and 23 November 2014. They were then aired from 22 February to 15 March, across four episodes. The Steal returned this series, proving to be successful in season three. This is where another coach saves a losing battle act from bowing out of the competition by drafting them to their Live Shows team. Each coach had one steal and had the opportunity of putting it to use by pressing the 'I Want You' button at the end of the battle.

Advanced
Eliminated
Saved

Coach	Contestants							Saved
Bressie	Dean Forrester	Jolene Burns	John O'Grady	Russell Hogg	Laura Enright	Denise Morgan	Emma Humber	Sasha Sangari Smith
Bressie	Aoife Smith	Ashley Loftus	Kenneth Usher	Ken Murphy	Catherine Hughes	Hannah Stockwell Quinn	Chloe Wilders	Kayleigh Cullinan
Rachel Stevens	Tara Gannon	Caoin Fitz	Amy Hansard	Cristin Nolan	Ellie-May Bopp	Cian O'Melia	Brian Dunne	Kieran McKillop
Rachel Stevens	Sarah McTernan	Paddy Kennedy	Ronan O'Healy	Paul Taylor	Leanne Power	Malcolm Urquhart	Gemma Lomax	Shannon Doyle
Kian Egan	Chris Brady	John Bonham	Rebecca Kelly	Fionn Gardner	Stuart Bond	Karla Chubb	Colm Conlan	Caoin Fitz
Kian Egan	Adam Cummins	Sasha Sangari Smith	Kate Purcell	Kathleen Mahon	Helena Bradley Bates	Ciara Monaghan	Jo Petit	Pat Fitz
Una Foden	Patrick Donoghue	Nicola Lynch	Sinead Hansard	Shannon Doyle	Kayleigh Cullinan	Pat Fitz	Evan Cotter	Kathleen Mahon
Una Foden	Kieran McKillop	Rachel Murphy	Kelly McArdle	Shauna Nolan	Niall O'Halloran	John Sheehy	Mark Joyce	Chloe Wilders

=== Battles 1 ===
Order	Coach	Winner	Song	Loser	'Steal' Result			
Order	Coach	Winner	Song	Loser	Bressie	Rachel	Kian	Una
1	Bressie	Dean Forrester	"The Love Cats"	Aoife Smith	—N/a	—	—	—
2	Kian	Chris Brady	"I Don't Want To Miss A Thing"	Adam Cummins	—	—	—N/a	—
3	Una	Patrick Donoghue	"You Give Me Something"	Kieran McKillop	—	✔	—	—N/a
4	Rachel	Sarah McTernan	"Changing"	Tara Gannon	—	—N/a	—	—
5	Bressie	Ashley Loftus	"Magic"	Jolene Burns	—N/a	—	—	—
6	Una	Nicola Lynch	"Roar"	Rachel Murphy	—	—	—	—N/a
7	Kian	John Bonham	"Animal"	Sasha Sangari Smith	✔	—	—N/a	✔

=== Battles 2 ===
Order	Coach	Winner	Song	Loser	'Steal' Result			
Order	Coach	Winner	Song	Loser	Bressie	Rachel	Kian	Una
1	Rachel	Paddy Kennedy	"Purple Rain"	Caoin Fitz	—	—N/a	✔	✔
2	Bressie	John O'Grady	"Riptide"	Kenneth Usher	—N/a	—	—	—
3	Kian	Kate Purcell	"Torn"	Rebecca Kelly	—	—	—N/a	—
4	Una	Kelley McArdle	"Stronger (What Doesn't Kill You)"	Sinead Hansard	—	—	—	—N/a
5	Rachel	Amy Hansard	"Human Nature"	Ronan O'Healy	—	—N/a	—	—
6	Kian	Fionn Gardner	"Some Nights"	Kathleen Mahon	—	—	—N/a	✔
7	Bressie	Ken Murphy	"Get Off of My Cloud"	Russell Hogg	—N/a	—	—	—

=== Battles 3 ===
Order	Coach	Winner	Song	Loser	'Steal' Result			
Order	Coach	Winner	Song	Loser	Bressie	Rachel	Kian	Una
1	Kian	Helena Bradley Bates	"Free Bird"	Stuart Bond	—	—	—N/a	—
2	Rachel	Paul Taylor	"Jackson"	Cristin Nolan	—	—N/a	—	—
3	Una	Shauna Nolan	"Heart Attack"	Shannon Doyle	—	✔	—	—N/a
4	Rachel	Ellie-May Bopp	"Just Like A Pill"	Leanne Power	—	—N/a	—	—
5	Kian	Ciara Monaghan	"Wide Awake"	Karla Chubb	—	—N/a	—N/a	—
6	Bressie	Laura Enright	"The Universal"	Catherine Hughes	—N/a	—N/a	—	—
7	Una	Niall O'Halloran	"I'll Be There"	Kayleigh Cullinan	✔	—N/a	—	—N/a

=== Battles 4 ===
Order	Coach	Winner	Song	Loser	'Steal' Result			
Order	Coach	Winner	Song	Loser	Bressie	Rachel	Kian	Una
1	Bressie	Denise Morgan	"No Rain"	Hannah Stockwell Quinn	—N/a	—N/a	—	—
2	Kian	Colm Conlan	"Wrecking Ball"	Jo Petit	—N/a	—N/a	—N/a	—
3	Una	John Sheehy	"Love Runs Out"	Pat Fitz	—N/a	—N/a	✔	—N/a
4	Rachel	Cian O'Melia	"Bonfire Heart"	Malcolm Urquhart	—N/a	—N/a	—N/a	—
5	Una	Evan Cotter	"Eleanor Rigby"	Mark Joyce	—N/a	—N/a	—N/a	—N/a
6	Rachel	Gemma Lomax	"Always"	Brian Dunne	—N/a	—N/a	—N/a	—
7	Bressie	Emma Humber	"We Don't Eat"	Chloe Wilders	—N/a	—N/a	—N/a	✔

== The Knockouts ==
=== Knockouts 1 (22 March) ===
Order	Coach	Artist	Song	Result
1	Una Foden	Shauna Nolan	"Bang Bang"	Eliminated
2	Una Foden	Kathleen Mahon	"Whole Lotta Love"	Eliminated
3	Una Foden	Patrick Donoghue	"Mamma Knows Best"	Safe
4	Kian Egan	Helena Bradley Bates	"I Want To Know What Love Is"	Safe
5	Kian Egan	Colm Conlan	"Angel of Small Death and the Codeine Scene"	Eliminated
6	Kian Egan	Chris Brady	"Dear Darlin"	Eliminated
7	Rachel Stevens	Kieran McKillop	"We Cry"	Safe
8	Rachel Stevens	Shannon Doyle	"Lips Are Movin"	Eliminated
—N/a	Rachel Stevens	Ellie-May Bopp	Withdrew	
9	Bressie	Emma Humber	"Eve, The Apple of my Eye"	Safe
10	Bressie	Dean Forrester	"The Way You Look Tonight"	Eliminated
11	Bressie	Sasha Sangari Smith	"Piece of my Heart"	Eliminated

=== Knockouts 2 (29 March) ===
Order	Coach	Artist	Song	Result
1	Kian Egan	Fionn Gardner	"That's What I Like About You"	Safe
2	Kian Egan	Pat Fitz	"Thinking Out Loud"	Eliminated
3	Kian Egan	Kate Purcell	"Sweet About Me"	Eliminated
4	Rachel Stevens	Sarah McTernan	"Ghost"	Safe
5	Rachel Stevens	Paul Taylor	"Father & Son"	Eliminated
6	Rachel Stevens	Cian O'Melia	"Blame it on Me"	Eliminated
7	Bressie	Ken Murphy	"20th Century Boy"	Eliminated
8	Bressie	Denise Morgan	"Ten Story Love Song"	Safe
9	Bressie	Laura Enright	"FourFiveSeconds"	Eliminated
10	Una Foden	Nicola Lynch	"Fancy"	Eliminated
11	Una Foden	Niall O'Halloran	"Love Me Like You Do"	Safe
12	Una Foden	Chloe Wilders	"Blank Space"	Eliminated

=== Knockouts 3 (5 April) ===
Order	Coach	Artist	Song	Result
1	Bressie	John O'Grady	"Hush"	Eliminated
2	Bressie	Kayleigh Cullinan	"Every Breaking Wave"	Safe
3	Bressie	Ashley Loftus	"Live Forever"	Eliminated
4	Rachel Stevens	Amy Hansard	"Price Tag"	Eliminated
5	Rachel Stevens	Paddy Kennedy	"I’m Not The Only One"	Safe
6	Rachel Stevens	Gemma Lomax	"Naughty Girl"	Eliminated
7	Kian Egan	Ciara Monaghan	"Cool Kids"	Eliminated
8	Kian Egan	John Bonham	"Run to the Hills"	Safe
9	Kian Egan	Caoin Fitz	"Night Changes"	Eliminated
10	Una Foden	Kelley McArdle	"Everywhere"	Eliminated
11	Una Foden	Evan Cotter	"Bad Bad Leroy Brown"	Eliminated
12	Una Foden	John Sheehy	"Firework"	Safe

== The Live Shows ==
The Live Shows were aired from 22 March to 26 April. Each episode was broadcast live from The Helix and the public were able to cast their vote to save acts of their choice. As per usual, there were special performances from guest and coaches. Patrick Donoghue won the entire competition on 26 April 2015, beating runner-up Emma Humber.

=== Quarter Final (12 April) ===
- Guest Performance: Brendan McCahey "Safe and Well"

Order	Coach	Artist	Song	Result
1	Rachel Stevens	Paddy Kennedy	"Pencil Full of Lead"	Eliminated
2	Rachel Stevens	Kieran McKillop	"Mirrors"	Saved by Public
3	Rachel Stevens	Sarah McTernan	"What I Did For Love"	Saved by Coach
4	Bressie	Kayleigh Cullinan	"Freewheel"	Eliminated
5	Bressie	Emma Humber	"Play Dead"	Saved by Public
6	Bressie	Denise Morgan	"These Words"	Saved by Coach
7	Una Foden	Patrick Donoghue	"Only Love Can Hurt Like This"	Saved by Public
8	Una Foden	John Sheehy	"Hold Back The River"	Saved by Coach
9	Una Foden	Niall O'Halloran	"Like I Can"	Eliminated
10	Kian Egan	Fionn Gardner	"Up"	Eliminated
11	Kian Egan	Helena Bradley Bates	"River Deep"	Saved by Coach
12	Kian Egan	John Bonham	"Stand By Me"	Saved by Public

=== Semi-final (19 April) ===
- Guest Performances:
  - Group Performance: "Hold My Hand"
  - HomeTown: "Cry for Help"

Order	Coach	Artist	Song	Result
1	Una Foden	John Sheehy	"Sugar"	Eliminated
2	Bressie	Denise Morgan	"Weak"	Eliminated
3	Rachel Stevens	Sarah McTernan	"Earned It"	Saved by Public
4	Kian Egan	John Bonham	"Welcome to the Jungle"	Eliminated
5	Rachel Stevens	Kieran McKillop	"Give Me Love"	Saved by Public
6	Kian Egan	Helena Bradley Bates	"You’re The Voice"	Eliminated
7	Bressie	Emma Humber	"What Kind of Man"	Saved by Public
8	Una Foden	Patrick Donoghue	"Ain't Nobody"	Saved by Public

=== Final (26 April) ===
- Guest Performances:
  - Coaches Performance: "Should I Stay or Should I Go"
  - Ryan Sheridan: "Here and Now"
  - Group Performance: "I Lived"

Order	Coach	Artist	First Song	Second Song	Result
1	Bressie	Emma Humber	"Hideaway"	"This Woman's Work"	Runner-up
2	Rachel Stevens	Kieran McKillop	"She Will Be Loved"	"We Cry"	Fourth
3	Rachel Stevens	Sarah McTernan	"If I Were A Boy"	"Who You Are"	Third
4	Una Foden	Patrick Donoghue	"Man in The Mirror"	"Mamma Knows Best"	Winner

== Results summary ==
Color keys

Artist's info

Artist from Team Bressie
Artist from Team Una
Artist from Team Rachel
Artist from Team Kian

Result details

Winner
Runner-up
Third place
Fourth place
Artist advanced to the finals
Artist was saved by the public
Artist was in the bottom two of his team
Artist received the fewest of the public's vote and was eliminated
Artist did not perform on that particular week
Artist withdrew from the competition

Artist	Week 1	Week 2	Week 3	Week 4	Semi-Final	Final
Patrick Donoghue	Safe			Safe	Advanced	Winner
Emma Humber	Safe			Safe	Advanced	Runner-up
Sarah McTernan		Safe		Bottom two	Advanced	Third Place
Kieran McKillop	Safe			Safe	Advanced	Fourth Place
John Bonham			Safe	Safe	Eliminated	Eliminated (Week 2)
Helena Bradley Bates	Safe			Bottom two	Eliminated	Eliminated (Week 2)
John Sheehy			Safe	Bottom two	Eliminated	Eliminated (Week 2)
Denise Morgan		Safe		Bottom two	Eliminated	Eliminated (Week 2)
Kayleigh Cullinan			Safe	Eliminated	Eliminated (Week 1)	
Paddy Kennedy			Safe	Eliminated	Eliminated (Week 1)	
Niall O'Halloran		Safe		Eliminated	Eliminated (Week 1)	
Fionn Gardner		Safe		Eliminated	Eliminated (Week 1)	
