= The Waiting Game (Una Healy album) =

Studio album by Una Healy
- Released: 10 February 2017
- Recorded: 2016
- Genre: Country pop
- Length: 40:11
- Label: Decca Records; Universal

Singles from The Waiting Game
- 1. "Stay My Love" Released: 13 January 2017; 2. "Battlelines" Released: 22 April 2017

The Waiting Game is the debut studio album by Irish singer Una Healy. It was released on 10 February 2017, through Decca Records. The album was preceded by the release of one single "Stay My Love". British singer Sam Palladio features as the only collaboration on the album. The Waiting Game has sold 12,000 copies in the UK and Ireland.

== Background and release ==
Following The Saturdays hiatus in 2014, on 18 April 2016, Healy premiered her first solo track, indie-inspired "Staring at the Moon", performing the song live on the semi-final of The Voice of Ireland. On 5 August 2016, Healy revealed she had signed a record deal with Decca Records. On 18 October 2016, Digital Spy reported that Healy's debut album would be released in 2017, under the reported title, The Waiting Game. On 27 October 2016, an audio video for the title track "The Waiting Game" was uploaded to Healy's YouTube account announcing the pre-order of the album. On 25 November 2016, an audio video for "Angel Like You" was released to Healy's YouTube channel.

== Singles ==
"Stay My Love" was released as the album's lead single on 13 January 2017. The music video was released on Healy's YouTube channel on 20 January 2017 directed by Urban Strom. The song charted on the Scottish Singles Chart at number fifty six.

== Track listing ==
Album credits taken from Discogs.

The Waiting Game — Standard edition
No.	Title	Writer(s)	Length
1.	"Battlelines"	Sacha Skarbek, Una Healy	3:01
2.	"The Waiting Game"	Nick Atkinson, Edd Holloway, Healy	3:32
3.	"Stay My Love" (feat. Sam Palladio)	Amy Wadge, Healy	3:17
4.	"All You Ever Need Is Love"	Wadge, Healy	2:56
5.	"S.O.S."	Adj Buffone, Healy	3:07
6.	"Please Don't Tell Me"	Jack McManus, Healy	3:19
7.	"Staring at the Moon"	Atkinson, Halloway, Rachel Furner, Healy	3:16
8.	"Alarm Bells"	Joe Corcoran, Emm Gryner, Healy	3:20
9.	"Craving You"	Wadge, Healy	3:57
10.	"Out the Door"	Buffone, Healy	3:14
11.	"Grow Up Not Old"	Ben Earle, Furner, Healy	3:36
12.	"Angel Like You"	Fiona Bevan, Jez Ashurst, Healy	3:50
Total length:			40:11

== Personnel ==
Credits adapted from Discogs.

Performers and musicians

- Una Healy – vocals
- Mark Read – backing vocals
- Sara Eker – backing vocals

Technical personnel

- Adam Phillips – guitar
- Brian Rawling – production
- Dick Beetham – mastering
- Dom Liu – recording, additional percussion
- Harry Rutherford – recording
- Ian Thomas – drums, bass
- Jeremy Meehan – bass
- Joe Corcoran – additional production
- Mark Read – piano
- Matt Furmidge – mixing, recording, percussion

== Charts ==
Chart (2017)	Peak position
Irish Albums (IRMA)	12
Scottish Albums (OCC)	13
UK Albums (OCC)	28

== Release history ==
Region	Date	Edition	Format	Label	Ref
United Kingdom	10 February 2017	Standard	Digital download, CD	Decca Records	
France	10 February 2017	Standard	Digital download, CD	Decca Records	
