= Beat the Star =

British game show

- Genre: Game show
- Created by: Stefan Raab
- Presented by: Vernon Kay; Phillip Schofield (2 episodes)
- Country of origin: United Kingdom
- Original language: English
- No. of series: 2
- No. of episodes: 16 (inc. unaired pilot) (list of episodes)

Production
- Running time: 75 minutes (inc. adverts)
- Production companies: Diverse Production and Gallowgate Productions

Original release
- Network: ITV
- Release: 20 April 2008 – 14 June 2009

Beat the Star is a British game show airing on television network ITV. It is the British version of the Schlag den Raab franchise, based on the German game show Schlag den Raab (Beat the Raab – Raab being Stefan Raab). A candidate who can beat a celebrity in a number of disciplines wins the jackpot, starting at £50,000.

== Premise ==
Each episode features one contestant battling against a celebrity in a number of disciplines. The games include sports contests such as climbing, motorsport and ice hockey, puzzles and various other challenges. The show notably features several highly unusual challenges, including using a saw to cut a large log, dropping a pea into a bottle from a height of 1 metre, hammering nails into a piece of wood, and chopping a large sausage.

Games carry varying numbers of points for the winner (1 point for game 1, 2 for game 2 etc.), and successful contestants win a prize of £50,000. If the celebrity wins, the jackpot rolls over (series 1), or is added to a prize fund for the season finale in which host Vernon Kay competes (series 2).

== Recording ==
The pilot and first series were recorded in Cologne, Germany, using the set and facilities of the original German version of the show (though the German location is never acknowledged in the show itself). Eight episodes were recorded during April 2008. Members of the studio audience can win €500 or one of 20 tickets for German Schlag den Raab. Candidates needed to be at least 18 years of age, have a driving licence and a passport. In October 2008 ITV announced a second series, having got good ratings with the first. Series 2 was recorded at Pinewood Studios in Buckinghamshire next to the 007 Set.

== Differences between Beat the Star and Schlag den Raab ==
Most noticeably, the UK show features a different celebrity player each week, is not broadcast live and lasts 75 minutes with 7 or 8 scheduled games (though remaining games are not played if the result is decided early).

In Germany, Schlag den Raab starts at 20:15 on Saturdays with a variable running time of at least four hours, with up to 15 individual games. The longest show in the history of Schlag den Raab lasted 368 minutes. The show began on Saturday 20:15 and ended on Sunday morning at 02:23. The German version starts with the selection of one of five candidates by televoting. The British remake is pre-recorded. In the German version, a member of the TV audience can win one or more cars, in the British version a member of the studio audience can win €500, though this is not shown in the broadcast show. The British version features different celebrities, whereas the German version is centred on television entertainer and late-night show host Stefan Raab. In the German version there was a jackpot starting with €500,000. The highest prize was €3.5 million on 15 December 2012.

The games are generally similar, although some games were dropped for series 2 of the UK show, when recording no longer took place in the original's Cologne studio.

In 2009, Beat the Star was brought back to Germany as Schlag den Star. Seven seasons with four episodes each have been aired since August 2015. Concerning the differences mentioned above, Schlag den Star is very similar to Beat the Star, but Stefan Raab (not being opponent) was a joker for the contestant in one of the first six games. Schlag den Raab was aired regularly until December 2015,Schlag den Star is still aired irregularly.

== Transmissions ==
Series	Episodes	Originally released	
Series	Episodes	First released	Last released
1	8	20 April 2008	22 June 2008
2	7	19 April 2009	31 May 2009
