= Vernon Kay =

British television and radio presenter (born 1974)

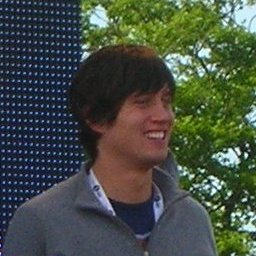
- Kay in 2007
- Born: Vernon Charles Kay; 28 April 1974 (age 52); Bolton, Greater Manchester, England
- Education: Manchester Metropolitan University
- Occupation: Broadcaster
- Years active: 1995–present
- Employers: BBC; ITV; Channel 4
- Television: T4 (2000–2005); All Star Family Fortunes (2006–2015); Beat the Star (2008–2009); The Whole 19 Yards (2010); Splash! (2013–2014); 1000 Heartbeats (2015–2016)
- Spouse: Tess Daly (m. 2003; sep. 2026)
- Children: 2

Vernon Charles Kay (born 28 April 1974) is an English broadcaster and former model. He presented Channel 4's T4 (2000–2005) and has presented various television shows for ITV and BBC, including All Star Family Fortunes (2006–2015), Just the Two of Us (2006–2007), Beat the Star (2008–2009), The Whole 19 Yards (2010), Splash! (2013–2014), and 1000 Heartbeats (2015–2016).

Kay presented his own BBC Radio 1 show between 2004 and 2012, and presented his own show on Radio X between 2015 and 2017. Since the start of the 2018–2019 season, he has been the main presenter for the live coverage of Formula E for English speaking territories/platforms around the world. In 2023, Kay was announced as the new mid-morning host on BBC Radio 2 from May 2023, taking over the slot from Ken Bruce.

In 2020, Kay appeared on the twentieth series of I'm a Celebrity...Get Me Out of Here!, finishing in third place.

== Early life ==
Vernon Charles Kay was born on 28 April 1974 and brought up in Horwich, the elder son of Norman, a lorry driver, and Gladys; he has a younger brother, Stephen, a primary school teacher. He attended St Joseph's RC High School in Horwich, near Bolton and then spent two years at St John Rigby College, Orrell. Aged 14, Kay had his first job, putting stickers on imported bananas at a factory, and upon leaving St John Rigby College, he had a job cleaning schools and covering for school caretakers across the Metropolitan Borough of Bolton. He then graduated in environmental science at Manchester Metropolitan University.

== Career ==
=== Modelling ===
In 1996, while working at his cousin's DIY shop, Kay attended the BBC Clothes Show Live where he was scouted by a modelling agency. He appeared in a cinema advert for PlayStation and was later crowned 'Model of the Week' on Channel 4's The Big Breakfast.

=== Television ===
Kay was able to use his success in modelling to launch a television career with co-hosting roles on teen-targeted entertainment shows T4 on Channel 4 and The Mag on Channel 5. Following this, Kay presented the summer CBBC weekend morning show Fully Booked (called FBI, Fully Booked Interactive) in 2000, as well as TOTP+ Plus and TOTP@Play. In 2003 he co-hosted the Channel 4 game show Boys and Girls, which was cancelled after one series. The following year Kay hosted the third series of Celebrities Under Pressure on ITV.

From 2006, Kay presented primetime game show All Star Family Fortunes. In June 2015, it was announced that ITV was to rest the show until 2017, but it did not return. In 2007, he presented Vernon Kay's Gameshow Marathon, after replacing Ant & Dec, who hosted the first series.

From 2008 until 2009, Kay presented two series of Beat the Star, a programme for ITV. The first series averaged 4.05 million viewers and the second averaged 3.46 million.

On 17 April 2010, Kay began co-presenting a game show for ITV called The Whole 19 Yards with Caroline Flack which lasted for eight episodes and was made at Pinewood Studios. The series averaged 4.1 million viewers. In 2010, Kay was the co-host of Skating with the Stars, a six-part series which was broadcast in the United States.

In 2011, Kay was originally going to present ITV game show Sing If You Can with Stacey Solomon but, after filming the pilot episode, he felt that it would be better hosted by a comedian, and was replaced by Keith Lemon.

In December 2011, Kay presented the Christmas Channel 4 show Home For the Holidays. In the summer of 2012, Kay presented ITV three episode mini-series Let's Get Gold, however the show received poor viewing figures and was cancelled.

In 2013 and 2014, Kay, Gabby Logan and Tom Daley co-presented the ITV diving show Splash! The programme was cancelled after two series.

In 2013, after Channel 4 regained the NFL rights from the BBC, Kay was announced as a presenter of The American Football Show, airing on Saturday mornings.

Since 2014, Kay has guest presented five episodes of The One Show. In 2015, Kay began presenting daytime quiz show, 1000 Heartbeats for ITV. The show returned for a second run in November 2015. In 2016, Kay presented Drive, a five-part entertainment show for ITV. He made regular appearances in the second series of The Keith Lemon Sketch Show on ITV2.

In July 2017, Kay co-presented The Hero Challenge with Kirsty Gallacher on Sky Sports.

Kay hosted the non-broadcast pilot for a revival of Play Your Cards Right, a game show formerly hosted by Bruce Forsyth, but was not commissioned for a series. In September 2015, he hosted a pilot for a new ITV game show Home Win, made at Fountain Studios in Wembley.

In November 2017, it was announced that Kay would host Channel 5's coverage of the 2017–18 Formula E motor racing season. He co-presented the FIA's coverage of the 2018–19 season.

In November 2020, it was announced that Kay would be taking part in the twentieth series of I'm a Celebrity...Get Me Out of Here. Kay reached the final and finished in third place on 4 December 2020.

It was announced in March 2021 that Kay would host the British version of new gameshow Game of Talents. In March 2022, Kay was a last-minute replacement for Joel Dommett as co-host of Red Nose Day's The Great Comic Relief Prizeathon.

=== Radio ===
In January 2004, Kay joined BBC Radio 1 and presented an entertainment show every Sunday. In April 2004, he was given the 10 am - 1 pm weekend slot, which was previously hosted by Colin Murray and Edith Bowman and previously broadcast on both Saturdays and Sundays on the popular radio network. From October 2007 Dick and Dom took over Sunday mornings; Kay's show then ran between 10 am to 1 pm on Saturday. In 2008, he was one of a team of DJs who filled in for Edith Bowman while she was on maternity leave, along with Fearne Cotton and Nihal.

On 11 February 2009, it was announced that Kay would fill in for Chris Moyles while he climbed Mount Kilimanjaro for Comic Relief, an act he repeated on 13 July 2009 when Moyles took a day off. He also filled-in for Pete Tong's Essential Selection on Radio 1 on 10 April 2008. That same year, Kay filled in again for Chris Moyles from 10 August to 15 August when he was on holiday. From 30 November 2009 Kay, again, covered for Chris Moyles on breakfast for a whole week as Moyles and Aled Haydn Jones were away in Uganda handing out malaria nets and seeing how the money raised from the Mount Kilimanjaro climb for Comic Relief was being spent.

On 9 November 2012, it was announced that Kay would leave BBC Radio 1 to spend more time with his family. He presented his final show on 22 December and was replaced by Matt Edmondson.

Three years after his departure from Radio 1, Kay returned to radio on the newly launched Radio X network. In September 2015, Kay began presenting the weekday morning show from 10 am to 1 pm. He left the station on Friday 17 March 2017.

Kay returned to BBC Radio after nine years away, to cover for Rylan Clark on his BBC Radio 2 show Rylan On Saturday on 6 and 13 February 2021 and again on the 12 and 26 June as well as 3 July. He stood in for Steve Wright on Steve Wright in the Afternoon during the week of the 24–28 May 2021. Kay stood in for Dermot O'Leary on 21 August 2021. He was scheduled to fill in for Wright again from 26 August to 1 September 2021 but only presented on the 26 and 27 August before he began isolating after testing positive for COVID-19 and was replaced by Gethin Jones. He sat in again from 13 to 15 October 2021 and from 25 November - 1 December 2021 whilst Wright had an illness. From March 2022, Kay became the regular cover for Zoe Ball on The Zoe Ball Breakfast Show.

In August 2022 Kay started broadcasting a weekly show on BBC Radio 2 Vernon Kay's Dance Sounds of the 90s, featuring "dance, electronica, techno, trance and drum n' bass hits from the 90s". In 2024, Kay took the show on tour, DJing for audiences in a number of UK venues.

On 24 February 2023, Kay was announced as the new host of BBC Radio 2's mid-morning show from May, replacing Ken Bruce. He began his show on 15 May 2023.

=== Film ===
Kay has made a number of cameos, appearing in Shaun of the Dead (2004) and Keith Lemon: The Film (2012). He also made an uncredited appearance as a feasting hall guest in Hercules (2014).

== Personal life ==
On 12 September 2003, Kay married Tess Daly at St Mary's Roman Catholic Church in Horwich, near Bolton. Together, they have two daughters, born in 2004 and 2009, and lived in Beaconsfield, Buckinghamshire. In May 2026, Kay and Daly announced on Instagram that they had separated.

In 2010, Kay was forced to apologise to his wife after it was revealed in the British press that he had been sending sexually explicit text and social media messages to model Rhian Sugden every day for four months. He subsequently admitted to sending similar messages to "four or five" other women at the same time.

Kay received an honorary doctorate from the University of Bolton on 9 July 2009 for services to entertainment.

Kay supports his hometown's football club Bolton Wanderers. He is also a fan of American football, joining the Manchester Allstars at the age of 13 and reuniting the team in 2011 for a one-off match against the Birmingham Lions. In 2011, he signed for the London Warriors, for whom he plays in the BAFANL Premier South division as a defensive back.

== Filmography ==
Television

Year	Title	Channel	Role	Notes
1995	Hollyoaks	Channel 4	Extra	First episode
1998–1999	The Mag	Channel 5	Co-Presenter	
2000	Fully Booked	BBC One	Co-Presenter	1 series (FBi)
2000	Top of the Pops Plus	BBC Two	Co-Presenter	
2000	Top of the Pops @ Play	UK Play	Co-Presenter	
2000–2005	T4	Channel 4	Co-Presenter	
2003	Boys and Girls	Channel 4	Co-Presenter	1 series
2004	HeadJam	BBC Three	Presenter	1 series
2004	Celebrities Under Pressure	ITV	Presenter	1 series
2005	Hit Me, Baby, One More Time	ITV	Presenter	1 series (UK), 1 series (U.S.)
2005	The Record of the Year	ITV	Presenter	
2006–2015	All Star Family Fortunes	ITV	Presenter	12 series
2006, 2007, 2013	The Paul O'Grady Show	Channel 4 / ITV	Guest Presenter	3 episodes
2007	Vernon Kay's Gameshow Marathon	ITV	Presenter	1 series
2008–2009	Beat the Star	ITV	Presenter	2 series
2010	The Whole 19 Yards	ITV	Presenter	1 series
2010	Skating with the Stars	ABC	Co-Presenter	
2011	Home For the Holidays	Channel 4	Presenter	1 series
2011	Million Dollar Mind Game	ABC	Presenter	1 series
2012	Let's Get Gold	ITV	Presenter	1 series
2013–2014	Splash!	ITV	Co-Presenter	2 series
2013–2015	The American Football Show	Channel 4	Presenter	
2014, 2016	The One Show	BBC One	Guest co-presenter	4 episodes
2015–2016	1000 Heartbeats	ITV	Presenter	2 series
2016	The Keith Lemon Sketch Show	ITV	Himself	Series regular
2016	Drive	ITV	Presenter	1 series
2016	Walliams & Friend	BBC One	Presenter, Celebrity Slammer	3 episodes
2017	The Hero Challenge	Sky Sports	Co-presenter	
2017–2018	Formula E	Channel 5	Presenter	
2018–2023	Formula E	YouTube, other streaming platforms	Presenter	
2020	I'm a Celebrity...Get Me Out of Here!	ITV	Contestant	Series 20
2021	Game of Talents	ITV	Presenter	
2021–present	Loose Women	ITV	Guest Anchor	Loose Men special, 2 episodes
2022	Rock Profile	BBC One	Presenter	Red Nose Day special
2022	The Great Comic Relief Prizeathon	BBC One	Presenter	Co-presenter; with AJ Odudu
2024-2025	M&S: Dress The Nation	ITV	Co-Presenter	Alongside AJ Odudu
2026-	Do You Know Your Place?	BBC Two	Co-Presenter	

Guest appearances

- It's Only TV...but I Like It (2002)
- Shooting Stars (2002)
- Bo' Selecta! (2003)
- Davina (2006)
- James Corden's World Cup Live (2010)
- Celebrity Juice (2011, 2013, 2015)
- Chris Moyles' Quiz Night (2011)
- 8 Out of 10 Cats (2011, 2012, 2013)
- Alan Carr: Chatty Man (2011)
- Would I Lie to You? (2013)
- That Puppet Game Show (2013)
- Room 101 (2014)
- Through the Keyhole (2014, 2015)
- Celebrity Squares (2014)
- Sunday Brunch (2015)
- Go 8 Bit (2017)
- How to Spend it Well at Christmas with Phillip Schofield (2017)
- Celebrity Catchphrase (2023)

Radio

Year	Station	Role	Notes
2004–2012	BBC Radio 1	Presenter	Saturdays, 10 am – 1 pm
2015–2017	Radio X	Presenter	Weekdays, 10 am – 1 pm
2023–present	BBC Radio 2	Presenter	Weekdays, 9.30 am – 12 pm

Film

Year	Title	Role
2012	Keith Lemon: The Film	Himself
2014	Hercules	Feasting hall guest (uncredited)

Preceded by Andy Collins	Host of Family Fortunes; 2006–2015 ("All Star")	Succeeded by Gino D'Acampo
